= Zymic Jaranilla =

Filipino actor

- Born: Zymic Demigod Lara Jaranilla; May 20, 2004 (age 22); Gloria, Oriental Mindoro, Philippines
- Occupations: Actor; philanthropist
- Years active: 2009–present
- Agent(s): ABS-CBN Corporation (2009–2010); TV5 Network (2011–2012); Sparkle GMA Artist Center (2013–present)
- Parent(s): Glendelle Lara Jaranilla (mother); Zenon Louis Jaranilla (father)
- Family: Zaijian and Zildjian Jaranilla (Brother)

Zymic Demigod Lara Jaranilla (born 20 May 2004) is a Filipino actor. Jaranilla is a GMA Network contract artist. His first appearance in TV was on ABS-CBN's May Bukas Pa, where he played as Junjun.

== Personal life ==
Jaranilla is the youngest and the third sibling within the Jaranilla family. He lives with his father, his grandmother, and his two older brothers. He is the youngest brother of Zaijian who has primary media company allegiance with ABS-CBN Corporation under its talent agency Star Magic while having secondary ones concurrently and conditionally on other companies GMA Network (Zymic's current company since 2013; 2011, 2019, 2025–present) and TV5 (2021–present) through an agreement between ABS-CBN and the latter two to work with them. He was homeschooled under Angelicum College in his elementary years.

== Career ==
Taking inspiration from his eldest brother, Jaranilla became an actor at a young age, initially signing and briefly working with ABS-CBN Corporation to play as Junjun on May Bukas Pa of the media company's namesake TV network. During behind the scenes of the series production that lasted until February 5, 2010, he is often along with Zaijian.

He further signed with TV5 Network for the series Felina: Prinsesa ng mga Pusa in 2011, playing the role of Young Joaquin. The series aired from February 27 to May 25, 2012.

After his short stints at ABS-CBN and TV5, he is currently signed with GMA's Sparkle. His first role with GMA was as the younger version of Aljur Abrenica's character in Prinsesa ng Buhay Ko. In 2014, he was cast alongside other child actors in the series Yagit, a remake of a popular series back in the 1980s. His performance and the rest of the young cast's was praised as "emotional and solid".

== Filmography ==
Year	Title	Role
2009	May Bukas Pa	Junjun
2012	Felina: Prinsesa ng mga Pusa	young Joaquin
2013	Prinsesa ng Buhay Ko	young Nick
2014	Yagit	Ding Santos
2014	The Ryzza Mae Show	Himself / Guest
2015	Dangwa	young Leo
2015	Little Nanay	young Bruce Wayne Batongbuhay
2015	Karelasyon: Webcam	MJ
2015	Magpakailanman: Ang Huling Yakap sa Nawalang Anak	Embet
2015	Magpakailanman: Una Siyang Naging Akin	young Dennis
2016	Poor Señorita	Rambo
2016	Alamat	Bulan
2016	Imbestigador	Victim
2017	Magpakailanman: Ang Sakripisyo ng Anak	young Ramon Burce
2017	Magpakailanman: Batik: Ang Santa Claus ng Tarlac	young Berto
2017	Meant to Be	Toti Del Valle
2017	Daig Kayo ng Lola Ko: Sleeping Rosa	Basilio
2017	Magpakailanman: Ang nanay sa kalsada	Alex
2018	Tadhana: Battered Wife	Bernard
2018	Daig Kayo ng Lola Ko: Mother Amor	Fred
2018	The Stepdaughters	young Froilan Almeda
2018	Tadhana: Sugat ni Inay	Prince
2018	Daig Kayo ng Lola Ko: Pepe and the Werpa Kids	Thirdy
2022	Wish Ko Lang!	
2025	Family Feud	Himself/Contestant (Jaranilla Family)
