= List of Poor Señorita episodes =

Poor Señorita is a 2016 Philippine television drama comedy series broadcast by GMA Network. It premiered on the network's Telebabad line up and worldwide on GMA Pinoy TV from March 28, 2016 to July 15, 2016, replacing Little Nanay.

Mega Manila and Urban Luzon ratings are provided by AGB Nielsen Philippines.

== Series overview ==
Month	Episodes	
Month	Episodes	Monthly Averages
March 2016	4	20.6%
April 2016	21	20.1%
May 2016	21	20.0%
June 2016	22	21.5%
July 2016	11	19.8%
Total	79	20.4%

== Episodes ==
=== March 2016 ===
Episode		Original air date	Social Media Hashtag	AGB Nielsen Mega Manila Households in Television Homes			Ref.
Episode		Original air date	Social Media Hashtag	Rating	Timeslot Rank	Primetime Rank	Ref.
1	Meet The Poor Señorita	March 28, 2016	#MeetThePoorSeñorita	21.5%	#2	#3	
2	Date Gone Wrong	March 29, 2016	#PSDateGoneWrong	20.2%	#2	#3	
3	Saying Goodbye	March 30, 2016	#PSSayingGoodbye	19.6%	#1	#1	
4	Hulog ng Langit	March 31, 2016	#PSHulogNgLangit	20.9%	#1	#2	

=== April 2016 ===
Episode		Original air date	Social Media Hashtag	AGB Nielsen Mega Manila Households in Television Homes			Ref.
Episode		Original air date	Social Media Hashtag	Rating	Timeslot Rank	Primetime Rank	Ref.
5	Misdiagnosed	April 1, 2016	#PSMisdiagnosed	19.8%	#2	#3	
6	Rita on the Run	April 4, 2016	#PSRitaOnTheRun	22.1%	#1	#2	
7	Small World	April 5, 2016	#PSSmallWorld	20.6%	#2	#2	
8	Tita Rita	April 6, 2016	#PSTitaRita	22.1%	#2	#2	
9	Saving Rita	April 7, 2016	#PSSavingRita	21.8%	#2	#2	
10	Survivor Rita	April 8, 2016	#PSSurvivorRita	20.4%	#2	#3	
11	Rita's Savings	April 11, 2016	#PSRitasSavings	20.4%	#2	#3	
12	Understanding Girlie	April 12, 2016	#PSUnderstandingGirlie	20.9%	#2	#3	
13	Rita To The Rescue	April 13, 2016	#PSRitaToTheRescue	19.5%	#2	#3	
14	Rita Vs. Deborah	April 14, 2016	#PSRitaVsDeborah	21.2%	#2	#3	
15	Don't Give Up, Rita!	April 15, 2016	#PSDontGiveUpRita	20.5%	#2	#3	
16	Rambo in Trouble	April 18, 2016	#PSRamboInTrouble	18.5%	#2	#3	
17	Proof ni Rita	April 19, 2016	#PSProofNiRita	18.4%	#2	#3	
18	Rita's Dream	April 20, 2016	#PSRitasDream	19.2%	#2	#3	
19	Rita's Decision	April 21, 2016	#PSRitasDecision	20.1%	#2	#3	
20	Doble Rita	April 22, 2016	#PSDobleRita	19.8%	#2	#3	
21	Looking for Rita	April 25, 2016	#PSLookingForRita	18.4%	#2	#3	
22	Run Rita, Run!	April 26, 2016	#PSRunRitaRun	18.9%	#2	#3	
23	Rita is Alive	April 27, 2016	#PSRitaIsAlive	19.2%	#2	#2	
24	Forgetful Rita	April 28, 2016	#PSForgetfulRita	19.7%	#2	#3	
25	Bahay-bahayan	April 29, 2016	#PSBahayBahayan	19.9%	#1	#3	

=== May 2016 ===
Episode		Original air date	Social Media Hashtag	AGB Nielsen Mega Manila Households in Television Homes			Ref.
Episode		Original air date	Social Media Hashtag	Rating	Timeslot Rank	Primetime Rank	Ref.
26	Pretend Family	May 2, 2016	#PSPretendFamily	20.0%	#2	#3	
27	Coach Rita	May 3, 2016	#PSCoachRita	19.3%	#2	#3	
28	Paeng Meets Piper	May 4, 2016	#PSPaengMeetsPiper	18.4%	#2	#3	
29	Getting Closer	May 5, 2016	#PSGettingCloser	19.5%	#2	#3	
30	Suspetsa ni Rita	May 6, 2016	#PSSuspetsaNiRita	18.4%	#2	#3	
31	Piper vs. Rita	May 10, 2016 (Note: Episode 31 did not air on May 9 during the 2016 Philippine general election news coverage.)	#PSPiperVsRita	21.4%	#1	#2	
32	Date Night	May 11, 2016	#PSDateNight	20.4%	#1	#2	
33	Surprise	May 12, 2016	#PSSurprise	21.8%	#1	#2	
34	Loving Rita	May 13, 2016	#PSLovingRita	18.8%	#2	#4	
35	Paeng's Promise	May 16, 2016	#PSPaengsPromise	19.8%	#2	#3	
36	Poor Señorita Meets Madam	May 17, 2016	#PSMeetsMadam	19.5%	#2	#3	
37	The Search For Rita	May 18, 2016	#PSTheSearchForRita	18.4%	#2	#3	
38	Working Girl, Rita	May 19, 2016	#PSWorkingGirlRita	20.1%	#2	#3	
39	Piper's Plan	May 20, 2016	#PSPipersPlan	18.4%	#2	#3	
40	Come Home, Rita	May 23, 2016	#PSComeHomeRita	20.0%	#2	#3	
41	Amazing Rita	May 24, 2016	#PSAmazingRita	21.2%	#2	#3	
42	Rita and Deborah	May 25, 2016	#PSRitaAndDeborah	21.0%	#2	#3	
43	Visiting Rita	May 26, 2016	#PSVisitingRita	22.7%	#2	#3	
44	Goodbye for Now	May 27, 2016	#PSGoodbyeForNow	19.6%	#2	#3	
45	Bilin ni Rita	May 30, 2016	#PSBilinNiRita	19.9%	#2	#3	
46	Mysterious Angie	May 31, 2016	#PSMysteriousAngie	21.1%	#2	#3	

=== June 2016 ===
Episode		Original air date	Social Media Hashtag	AGB Nielsen Mega Manila Households in Television Homes			Ref.
Episode		Original air date	Social Media Hashtag	Rating	Timeslot Rank	Primetime Rank	Ref.
47	Ingat, Paeng!	June 1, 2016	#PSIngatPaeng	19.8%	#1	#2	
48	Rita is Back	June 2, 2016	#PSRitaIsBack	21.7%	#2	#3	
49	The Proposal	June 3, 2016	#PSTheProposal	20.7%	#2	#3	
50	Emergency	June 6, 2016	#PSEmergency	20.3%	#2	#3	
51	Alam Na!	June 7, 2016	#PSAlamNa	22.1%	#2	#3	
52	Face-Off	June 8, 2016	#PSFaceOff	19.9%	#2	#3	
53	Rita's Revenge	June 9, 2016	#PSRitasRevenge	21.5%	#2	#3	
54	Reunion	June 10, 2016	#PSReunion	21.3%	#2	#3	
55	New Beginnings	June 13, 2016	#PSNewBeginnings	23.0%	#1	#2	
56	Rita By Their Side	June 14, 2016	#PSRitaByTheirSide	23.4%	#1	#2	
57	Poor Señorita Loves Girlie	June 15, 2016	#PSLovesGirlie	22.4%	#2	#3	
58	Missing Girlie	June 16, 2016	#PSMissingGirlie	22.6%	#2	#3	
59	Deborah Strikes Again	June 17, 2016	#PSDeborahStrikesAgain	20.4%	#2	#3	
60	Rita and Jaime	June 20, 2016	#PSRitaAndJaime	21.2%	#1	#2	
61	Take Two	June 21, 2016	#PSTakeTwo	22.5%	#2	#3	
62	Rita vs. Bane	June 22, 2016	#PSRitaVsBane	22.9%	#1	#2	
63	Paeng's Decision	June 23, 2016	#PSPaengsDecision	20.7%	#1	#2	
64	Rita's True Feelings	June 24, 2016	#PSRitasTrueFeelings	20.5%	#2	#3	
65	Come Back, Paeng!	June 27, 2016	#PSComeBackPaeng	21.5%	#2	#3	
66	New Trial	June 28, 2016	#PSNewTrial	22.2%	#2	#3	
67	Pray for Charisse	June 29, 2016	#PSPrayForCharisse	20.7%	#2	#3	
68	Painful Truth	June 30, 2016	#PSPainfulTruth	21.9%	#2	#3	

=== July 2016 ===
Episode		Original air date	Social Media Hashtag	AGB Nielsen Urban Luzon Households in Television Homes			Ref.
Episode		Original air date	Social Media Hashtag	Rating	Timeslot Rank	Primetime Rank	Ref.
69	Truth is Out	July 1, 2016	#PSTruthIsOut	18.0%	#2	#4	
70	Birthday Surprise	July 4, 2016	#PSBirthdaySurprise	18.6%	#2	#5	
71	Looking for Charisse	July 5, 2016	#PSLookingForCharisse	19.5%	#2	#4	
72	Saving Girlie	July 6, 2016	#PSSavingGirlie	19.0%	#2	#4	
73	Answered Prayer	July 7, 2016	#PSAnsweredPrayer	19.7%	#2	#5	
74	Family Reunion	July 8, 2016	#PSFamilyReunion	20.0%	#2	#4	
75	Rita Alone	July 11, 2016	#PSRitaAlone	20.7%	#2	#3	
76	Make Rita Happy	July 12, 2016	#PSMakeRitaHappy	20.5%	#2	#3	
77	Reaching Out	July 13, 2016	#PSReachingOut	19.8%	#2	#4	
78	Just in Time	July 14, 2016	#PSJustInTime	20.3%	#2	#4	
79	Happy Ever After	July 15, 2016	#PSHappyEverAfter	22.0%	#2	#2	

Episodes notes
