= Chlaui Malayao =

Filipina child actress (born 2008)

- Born: María Chlaui Denise Malayao; January 24, 2008 (age 18); Imus, Cavite, Philippines
- Occupation: Actress
- Years active: 2014–present
- Agent: GMA Artist Center (2014–present)
- Known for: Eliza Guison in Yagit; Chiechie B. San Pedro in Little Nanay

Maria Chlaui Denise Malayao (Tagalog pronunciation: [mɐˈlɐjaʊ]; born January 24, 2008) is a Filipino actress who played lead roles in the television series Yagit (2014) and Little Nanay (2015).

== Career ==
Before landing roles in television series, Malayao appeared in several television advertisements. She played a lead role in the 2014 drama series Yagit as Eliza Guizon, and in the 2015 drama Little Nanay as Chiechie B. San Pedro. She also took on episodic roles in the anthology Magpakailanman. In 2016, she portrayed young Lira in the fantasy drama Encantadia, and in 2017, she played Moira Villavicencio in the fantasy anthology Daig Kayo ng Lola Ko and earned the Best Child Performer for TV award at the ALTA Media Icon Awards in 2018.

As of now, she remains active in acting, often appearing in guest roles on various GMA Network series, such as the anthology Wish Ko Lang. However, she currently prioritizes her studies as a student.

== Filmography ==
=== Television ===
Year	Title	Role	Note(s)
2014–2015	Yagit	Eliza Guison	Lead role
2015–2016	Little Nanay	Chiechie B. San Pedro	Lead role
2015–2016	Magpakailanman	Badet / Angel	Unknown episode title
2016	Encantadia	young Lira	Guest role
2016	Conan, My Beautician	Debbie	Guest role
2016	Sa Piling ni Nanay	Angelica Mae "Maymay" Salvacion	Guest role
2017	D' Originals	Macy	Supporting role
2017	Wagas	Haunted Manyika	Unknown episode title
2017–2020	Daig Kayo ng Lola Ko	Moira Villavicencio	Lead role
2022	Abot-Kamay na Pangarap	Wendy	Guest role
2023	Wish Ko Lang	Hannah	Episode: "Pinakain ng Basura"
2023	Imbestigador	Joelina Escamillas	Episode: "Bata sa Bakanteng Lote"
2023–2024	Pinoy Crime Stories	Shiela Mae Aloy-Agoy	Episode: "Kwintas"
2023–2024	Pinoy Crime Stories	Joanna	Episode: "Huling Iyak"
2023	Black Rider	Ayamae "Ayong" Santos	Guest role

=== Film ===
Year	Title	Role
2014	Moron 5.2: The Transformation	Coring
