= Conan, My Beautician =

2016 Philippine television sitcom series

- Title card
- Genre: Sitcom
- Created by: Adolfo B. Alix Jr.
- Written by: Zig Dulay; Michael Cardoz; Eljay Deldoc; Jerome Zamora
- Directed by: Adolfo B. Alix Jr.
- Starring: Mark Herras; Megan Young
- Theme music composer: Simon Peter Tan
- Opening theme: "Yan si Conan" by Simon Peter Tan
- Country of origin: Philippines
- Original language: Tagalog
- No. of episodes: 13

Production
- Executive producer: Carlo M. Balaquiot
- Production locations: Quezon City, Philippines
- Cinematography: Albert Banzon; Mark Joseph Cosico
- Camera setup: Multiple-camera setup
- Running time: 26–27 minutes
- Production company: GMA Public Affairs

Original release
- Network: GMA Network
- Release: June 26 – September 18, 2016

Conan, My Beautician is a 2016 Philippine television sitcom series broadcast by GMA Network. Directed by Adolf Alix Jr., it stars Mark Herras and Megan Young. It premiered on June 26, 2016. The series concluded on September 18, 2016, with a total of 13 episodes.

The series is streaming online on YouTube.

== Premise ==
Conan is a straight man from a family of barbers. He must work in a beauty salon in Manila after his family is forced to escape from their hometown. While at the Salon Paz he pretends to be a flamboyant beautician, although he ends up falling in love with the bride, Ava, that he is working for.

== Cast and characters ==
Cast

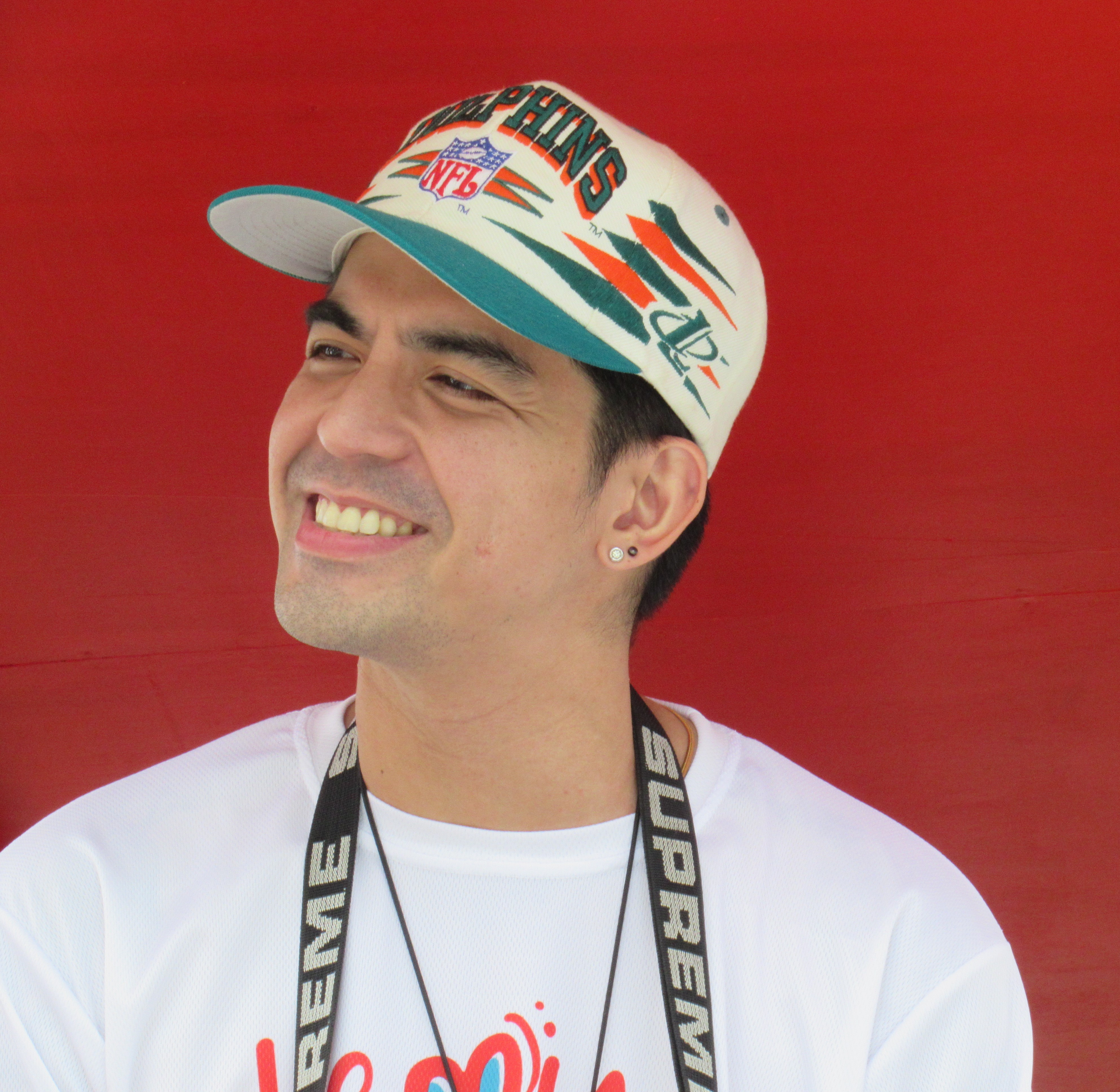
Mark Herras

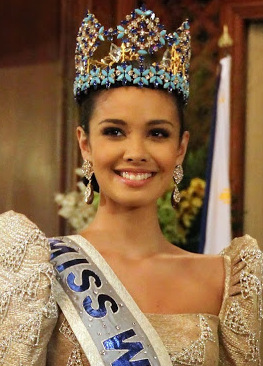
Megan Young

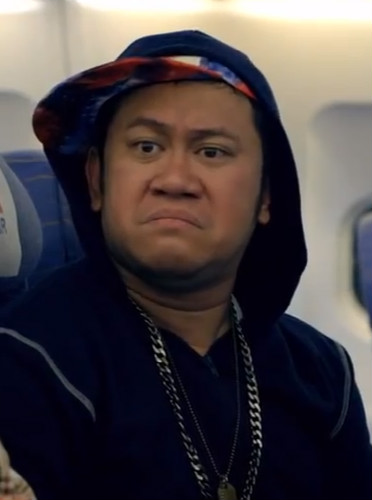
Betong Sumaya

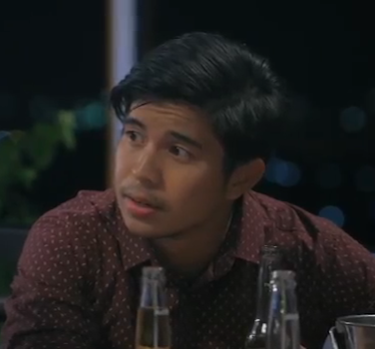
Rodjun Cruz

Lead cast

- Mark Herras as Conan
- Megan Young as Ava

Supporting cast

- Lotlot de Leon as Perla
- Cacai Bautista and Candy Pangilinan as Chika la Chaka
- Balang Bughaw as Conor
- Atak Araña as Greg
- Betong Sumaya as Mimi
- Divine Tetay as Pia
- Vangie Labalan as Mrs. Paz
- Rodjun Cruz as Prince
- Lovely Abella as Sharon
- Ken Anderson as Gabby
- Mailes Kanapi as Ava's mom
- Juliene Medoza as Ava's dad

Guest cast

- Boobsie Wonderland as Dubbie
- Chlaui Malayao as Debbie
- Gemma Gonzaga as Iluminada
- Antonette Garcia as Betty
- Mike Tan as Mike
- Angelica Jones as Kiray
- Benedick Rellama as Kiko
- Menggie Cobarrubias as Alfonso
- Jay Manalo as Conrado
- Marc Justin Alvarez as younger Prince
- Elijah Alejo as younger Ava

== Episodes ==
Episodes of Conan, My Beautician
No.	Title	Original air date	AGB Nielsen Ratings
1	"Pilot"	June 26, 2016	16.7%
2	"Run Conan Run"	July 3, 2016	15.8%
3	"Conan in the City"	July 10, 2016	14.6%
4	"Against All Odds"	July 17, 2016	12.8%
5	"Conan Meets Ava"	July 24, 2016	12.3%
6	"The Bride"	July 31, 2016	12.2%
7	"The Revelation"	August 7, 2016	11.7%
8	"Fake BF"	August 14, 2016	16.6%
9	"First Kiss"	August 21, 2016	11.9%
10	"After the Kiss"	August 28, 2016	13.4%
11	"Budol-budol"	September 4, 2016	15.1%
12	"The Truth"	September 11, 2016	10%
13	"The Finale"	September 18, 2016	11.0%

== Accolades ==
Accolades received by Conan, My Beautician
Year	Award	Category	Recipient	Result	Ref.
2016	30th PMPC Star Awards for Television	Best Comedy Program	Conan, My Beautician	Nominated	
