= Yagit (2014 TV series) =

Philippine television drama series

- Title card
- Also known as: Pushcart of Dreams
- Genre: Drama
- Created by: Eddie Ilarde; Jose Miranda Cruz
- Based on: Yagit (1983)
- Directed by: Gina Alajar; Don Michael Perez
- Creative directors: Jun Lana; Roy Iglesias
- Starring: Chlaui Malayao; Zymic Jaranilla; Judie Dela Cruz; Jemwell Ventinilla
- Narrated by: Chlaui Malayao
- Theme music composer: Gloc-9
- Opening theme: "Basta't Kasama Ka" by Gloc-9 and Lirah Bermudez
- Ending theme: "Kaming Mga Yagit" by Chlaui Malayao, Zymic Jaranilla, Judie dela Cruz and Jemuell Ventinilla
- Country of origin: Philippines
- Original language: Tagalog
- No. of episodes: 203 (list of episodes)

Production
- Executive producer: Joseph T. Aleta
- Production locations: Manila, Philippines
- Camera setup: Multiple-camera setup
- Running time: 20–29 minutes
- Production company: GMA Entertainment TV

Original release
- Network: GMA Network
- Release: October 13, 2014 – July 24, 2015

Yagit (transl. trash / international title: Pushcart of Dreams) is a Philippine television drama series broadcast by GMA Network. The series is based on a 1983 Philippine television drama series of the same title. Directed by Gina Alajar, it stars Chlaui Malayao, Zymic Jaranilla, Judie Dela Cruz and Jemwell Ventinilla. It premiered on October 13, 2014 on the network's Afternoon Prime line up. The series concluded on July 24, 2015, with a total of 203 episodes.

The series is streaming online on YouTube.

== Cast and characters ==
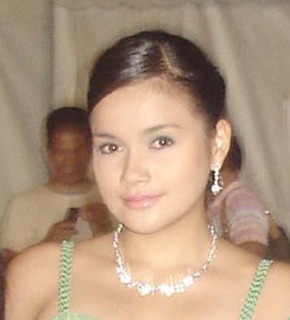
Yasmien Kurdi portrays Dolores Macabuhay.

Lead cast

- Chlaui Malayao as Eliza Guison / Chelsea Villaroman
- Zymic Jaranilla as Ding Santos
- Judie Dela Cruz as Jocelyn "Josie" Carpio Macabuhay
- Jemwell Ventinilla as Tomas "Tom-Tom" Carpio Macabuhay

Supporting cast

- Yasmien Kurdi as Dolores "Dolor" Macabuhay-Guison
- James Blanco as Victor Guison Jr.
- LJ Reyes as Florentina "Flora" Fabro-Macabuhay
- Kevin Santos as Kardo Macabuhay
- Bettina Carlos as Maricel "Izel" Ongkiko
- Renz Fernandez as Roman Guevarra
- Rich Asuncion as Odette
- Raquel Villavicencio as Donya Claudia Guison

Recurring cast

- Ina Feleo as Imelda
- Alessandra De Rossi as Marilou "Lulu" Prado-Villaroman / Anastacia "Ana" Santos
- Wowie de Guzman as Chito Asuncion
- Rich Asuncion as Odette
- Maricris Garcia as Cece Guison-Ortega
- Stephanie Yamut as Tiffany
- Frank Magalona as Bruce Guison
- Bea Binene as Jam Malino
- Boy 2 Quizon as Elmo

Guest cast

- Paolo Contis as Rex Villamor / Restituto Santos
- Shermaine Santiago as Ethel Santos
- German Moreno as Florentino Valdez
- Jirvy dela Cruz as Butch
- Mark Herras as Rodney Estrella
- Bobby Andrews as Ferdinand
- Bryan Benedict as Andoy
- Joseph Bitangcol as Tonyo
- Jaya as Madam
- Hiro Peralta as Limuel
- Kiko Estrada as Pipo
- Chariz Solomon as Mabel
- Princess Punzalan as Mildred "Mili" Prado
- Leny Santos as Babylyn
- Joseph Izon as Berting
- Gene Padilla as Kulas
- Rafa Siguion-Reyna as Baldo
- Nomer Limatog as Jordan
- Mitzi Borromeo as Elena
- Dolly Gutierrez as Amparo
- Dingdong Dantes as Jericho "Kokoy" Evangelista

== Casting ==
In April 2015, Philippine actor Dingdong Dantes made an appearance as Kokoy, who originated from the 2015 Philippine television Christian drama series Pari 'Koy.

== Production ==
Principal photography commenced in July 2014.

== Ratings ==
According to AGB Nielsen Philippines' Mega Manila household television ratings, the pilot episode of Yagit earned a 16.1% rating. The final episode scored a 21.5% rating.

== Accolades ==
Accolades received by Yagit
Year	Award	Category	Recipient	Result	Ref.
2015	29th PMPC Star Awards for Television	Best Child Performer	Chlaui Malayao	Nominated	
2015	29th PMPC Star Awards for Television	Best New Female TV Personality	Stephanie Yamut	Nominated	
2015	29th PMPC Star Awards for Television	Best New Male TV Personality	Jemuell Ventinilla	Nominated	
