= Poor Señorita =

2016 Philippine television drama series

- Title card
- Genre: Comedy drama
- Created by: Renei Dimla
- Written by: John Kenneth De Leon; Glaiza Ramirez; Marlon Miguel
- Directed by: Dominic Zapata
- Creative director: Roy Iglesias
- Starring: Regine Velasquez
- Theme music composer: Arlene M. Calvo
- Opening theme: "Tunay na Kayamanan" by Regine Velasquez; "Without You" by Lara Maigue
- Country of origin: Philippines
- Original language: Tagalog
- No. of episodes: 79 (list of episodes)

Production
- Executive producer: Kaye Atienza-Cadsawan
- Producer: Lenie Santos
- Production locations: Manila, Philippines
- Cinematography: Roman Theodossis
- Editor: Suzette Doctolero
- Camera setup: Multiple-camera setup
- Running time: 24–35 minutes
- Production company: GMA Entertainment TV

Original release
- Network: GMA Network
- Release: March 28 – July 15, 2016

Poor Señorita (transl. poor miss) is a 2016 Philippine television drama comedy series broadcast by GMA Network. Directed by Dominic Zapata, it stars Regine Velasquez in the title role. It premiered on March 28, 2016 on the network's Telebabad line up. The series concluded on July 15, 2016, with a total of 79 episodes.

The series is streaming online on YouTube.

== Premise ==
Rita was the only daughter of her father, Daniel, who will later die of gastric cancer. Rita will later be diagnosed with gastric cancer like her father and warned that she only have three months left before she dies. Rita decides to give away and donate her assets. She will later discover that she was misdiagnosed. With no money and being pursued by a hitman, Rita hides and meets Kyla, Rambo, Charisse, Apol and Girlie who will help her.

== Cast and characters ==
Cast

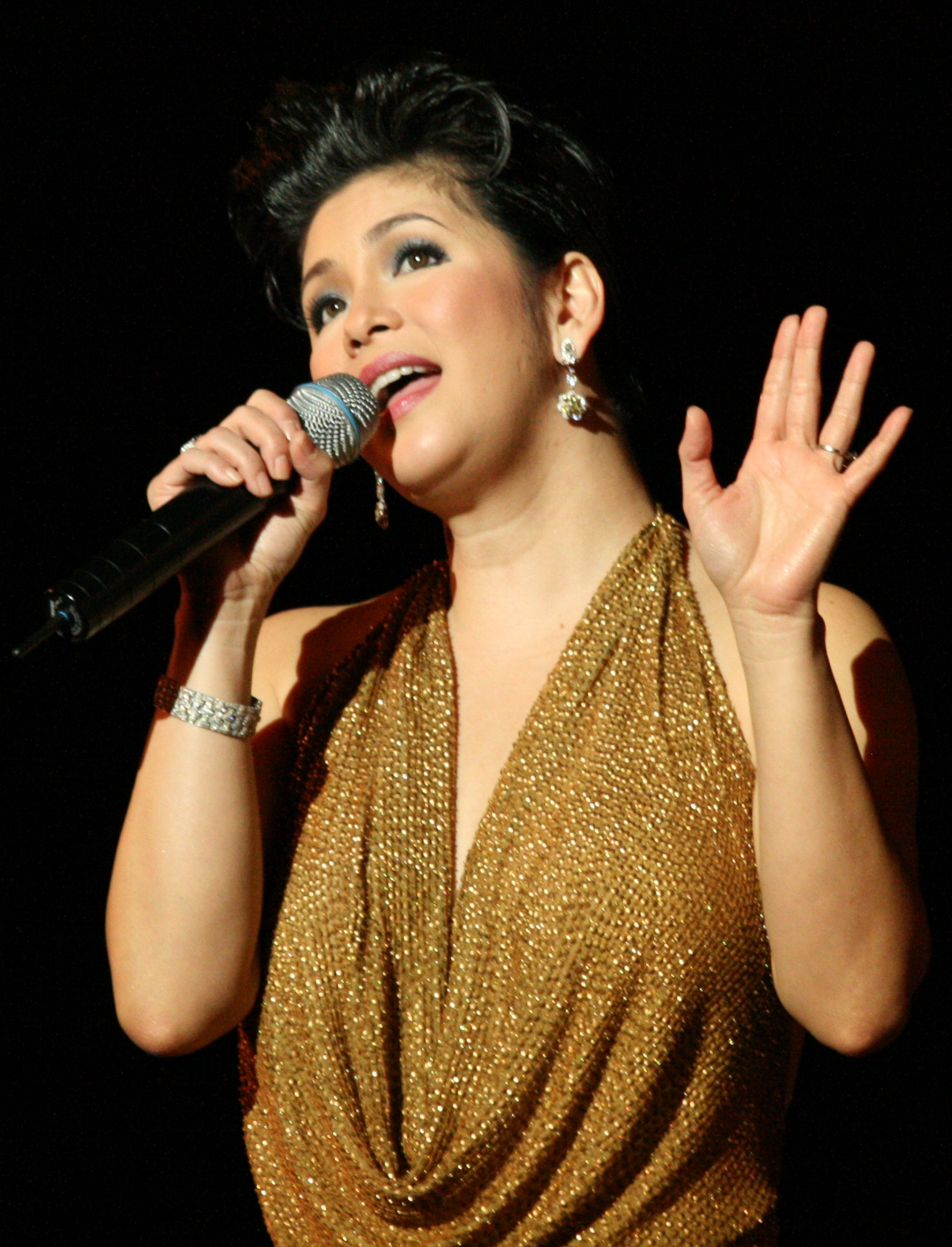
Regine Velasquez

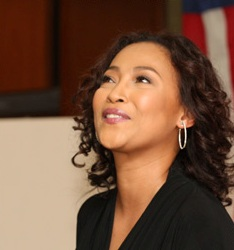
Jaya

Lead cast

- Regine Velasquez as Margarita "Rita" Villon-Castillo

Supporting cast

- Mikael Daez as Rafael "Paeng" Castillo
- Sheena Halili as Maika Ramirez Villon
- Kevin Santos as Kilmer / Kimpoy
- Valeen Montenegro as Piper Villon
- Jaya as Edna Logatoc
- Ervic Vijandre as Jordan
- Jillian Ward as Charisse dela Cruz
- Miggs Cuaderno as Apolinario "Apol" dela Cruz
- Zymic Jaranilla as Rambo dela Cruz
- Caprice Mendez as Kimberly "Girlie" Salcedo-Reyes
- Ralph Noriega as Isko
- Snooky Serna as Deborah Villon
- Ayra Mariano as Maria Kyla dela Cruz
- Elyson De Dios as Edison Villon

Recurring cast

- Jojit Lorenzo as Tero
- Geleen Eugenio as Madam Lou
- Rob Sy as Ruben "Drive U Crazy"
- Atak as Hayme
- Beatriz Imperial as Poochie
- Manilyn Reynes as Ligaya Aya de Beauvoir
- Camille Torres as Niña de Beauvoir
- Tess Bomb as Anna
- Divine Tetay as Pepay
- Jelson Bay as Castor
- Mikofresh Cruz as Kikay
- Gladys Reyes as Lydia dela Cruz
- Wilma Guerrero as Bubbles
- Nhett Buenaflor as Blossom
- Wenna Jarito as Buttercup

Guest cast

- Lindsay De Vera as younger Rita
- Ricky Davao as Daniel Villon
- Dingdong Dantes as Rafael Buenaventura
- Lauren Young as Vanessa "Bane"
- LJ Reyes as Anjie Batumbakal
- Renz Fernandez as Boyet Reyes
- Diva Montelaba as Minerva Reyes
- Nina Ricci Alagao as Lucy Ferrer
- Gabby Concepcion as Jaime Salcedo (crossover character from Because of You)

== Casting ==
On January 4, 2016, Regine Velasquez renewed her contract with GMA Network. During the contract signing, Velasquez stated that she will be doing a musical-variety-comedy show and a "light" comedy series for 2016. She described her character in the show as "a very different character for me to play."

In a story conference held on January 29, 2016, actresses Snooky Serna and Jaya along with Sheena Halili, Valeen Montenegro, Jillian Ward, Miggs Cuaderno and Zymic Jaranilla joined Velasquez for the series, while Mikael Daez acting as her love interest. Dominic Zapata directed the show. StarStruck season 6's finalists Elyson de Dios and Ayra Mariano, were personally requested by Velasquez to join the cast. It served as their first drama series after StarStruck.

== Production ==
Principal photography commenced in February 2016. Filming concluded on July 4, 2016.

== Ratings ==
According to AGB Nielsen Philippines' Mega Manila household television ratings, the pilot episode of Poor Senorita earned a 21.5% rating. The final episode scored a 22% rating.

== Accolades ==
Accolades received by Poor Señorita
Year	Award	Category	Recipient	Result	Ref.
2016	30th PMPC Star Awards for Television	Best Primetime Drama Series	Poor Señorita	Nominated	
2016	30th PMPC Star Awards for Television	Best Child Performer	Miggs Cuaderno	Nominated	
2016	30th PMPC Star Awards for Television	Best New Female TV Personality	Ayra Mariano	Nominated	
