= Renz Fernandez =

Filipino actor

- Born: Renz Marion Aluquin Fernandez; September 8, 1985 (age 40); Manila, Philippines
- Occupation: Actor
- Years active: 1995–present
- Spouse: Jef Gaitan
- Parents: Rudy Fernandez; (father); Lorna Tolentino (mother)
- Relatives: Mark Anthony Fernandez (half-brother); Teodila Galicio (aunt)

Renz Marion Aluquin Fernandez (born September 8, 1985) is a Filipino actor. He is the son of Rudy Fernandez and Lorna Tolentino and stepgrandson of film director Gregorio Fernandez. He is a contract star of ABS-CBN's Star Magic, but in 2013 he starred in the GMA television series Prinsesa ng Buhay Ko as Luis Grande. He worked with his half-brother Mark Anthony Fernandez (whom he played younger version of character) for their father's film Matimbang Pa sa Dugo (1995) and Magpakailanman episode Lubog sa putik is based on 2009 Quezon floods.

== Filmography ==
=== Film ===
| Year | Title | Role |
|---|---|---|
| 1995 | Matimbang Pa Sa Dugo | Young Boying |
| 2012 | The Reunion | Rico |

=== Television ===
| Year | Title | Role |
|---|---|---|
| 2011 | Your Song Presents: Kim | Jepoy |
| 2011 | Wansapanataym Presents: Apir Disapir | Jepoy |
| 2012–2013 | Little Champ | Jason |
| 2013 | Magpakailanman | Manuel |
| 2013–2014 | Prinsesa ng Buhay Ko | Louise Grande |
| 2014 | Magpakailanman | Alvin |
| 2014–2015 | Yagit | SPO2 Roman Guevarra |
| 2015 | Imbestigador | Sheldon |
| 2015 | Wagas | Danny Van Ommen |
| 2015–2016 | Little Nanay | Gerald Cruz |
| 2016 | Imbestigador | Emedilio |
| 2016 | Poor Señorita | Boyet |
| 2016 | Magpakailanman | Buboy |
| 2017 | My Love from the Star | Detective Peter Yuzon |
| 2017 | Impostora | PS/Insp. Mateo Reyes |
| 2018 | The One That Got Away | Gabriel "Gab" Tan |
| 2018 | Cain at Abel | Louie Fernando |
| 2019 | The Better Woman | Paolo |
| 2020 | Descendants of the Sun | Earl Jimeno |
| 2024 | FPJ's Batang Quiapo | Bullet |

== Personal life ==
In June 2024, Fernandez married Jef Gaitan at Las Casas Filipinas de Acuzar with wedding sponsors Senator Grace Poe, Senator Lito Lapid and Manny Pacquiao, and they had a son who was born in 2025.
