= Pari 'Koy =

2015 Philippine television drama series

- Title card
- Also known as: My Holy Bro
- Genre: Christian drama
- Created by: Christine Badillo-Novicio
- Written by: Christine Badillo-Novicio; Ronalyn Sales; Jake Somera
- Directed by: Maryo J. de los Reyes
- Creative director: Roy Iglesias
- Starring: Dingdong Dantes
- Theme music composer: Janno Gibbs
- Opening theme: "Pari 'Koy" by Janno Gibbs
- Country of origin: Philippines
- Original language: Tagalog
- No. of episodes: 118 (list of episodes)

Production
- Executive producer: Darling Pulido-Torres
- Production locations: Quezon City, Philippines
- Camera setup: Multiple-camera setup
- Running time: 22–41 minutes
- Production company: GMA Entertainment TV

Original release
- Network: GMA Network
- Release: March 9 – August 21, 2015

Pari 'Koy (transl. priest 'Koy / international title: My Holy Bro) is a 2015 Philippine television drama Christian series broadcast by GMA Network. Directed by Maryo J. de los Reyes, it stars Dingdong Dantes in the title role. It premiered on March 9, 2015, on the network's Telebabad line up. The series concluded on August 21, 2015, with a total of 118 episodes.

The series is streaming online on YouTube.

== Premise ==
Father Kokoy has to leave San Augustine and move to a chapel somewhere in Manila. As he starts his journey, he will get attached to the people and will eventually learn that he has a child "Pinggoy" with her ex-girlfriend, Michelle.

== Cast and characters ==
Cast

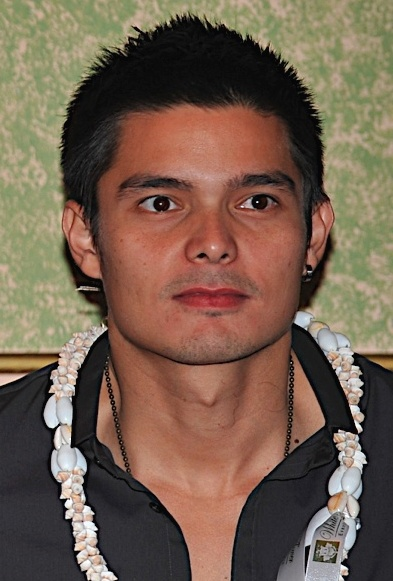
Dingdong Dantes

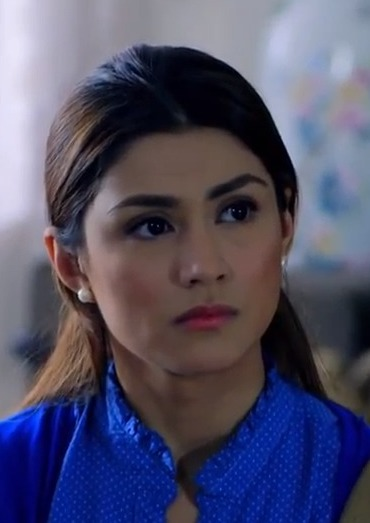
Carla Abellana

Lead cast

- Dingdong Dantes as Jericho "Kokoy" Evangelista

Supporting cast

- David Remo as Paul "Pinggoy" Ramos-Evangelista
- Sunshine Dizon as Noemi Espiritu-Cruz
- Chanda Romero as Martha Buenavista
- Gabby Eigenmann as Jude Banal
- Luz Valdez as Esther San Pablo
- Dexter Doria as Salome Marasigan Espiritu
- Jillian Ward as Sarah Espiritu Cruz
- Jeric Gonzales as Eli Marasigan
- JC Tiuseco as Timoteo "Timo" Espiritu
- Carlo Gonzales as Simon Cruz
- Rap Fernandez as Solomon "Sol" Castillo
- Hiro Peralta as Samuel "Sam" Evangelista Jr.
- Lindsay De Vera as Ava Buenavista
- Jojit Lorenzo as Tomas Sacramento
- Jhiz Deocareza as Japet Lazaro
- Catherine Remperas as Maggie Tadeo-Espiritu

Recurring cast

- Victor Neri as Matthew
- Martin del Rosario as Jeremy
- Spanky Manikan as Manuel Evangelista

Guest cast

- Alden Richards as younger Kokoy
- Jackie Lou Blanco as Kokoy's mother
- Carla Abellana as Michelle Capistrano-Banal
- Rita De Guzman as Joanna
- Jak Roberto as Omar
- Kris Bernal as Regine
- Mark Herras as James
- Andrea del Rosario as Melba
- Leandro Baldemor as Daniel
- Antone Lingeco as Melba and Daniel's son
- Sheena Halili as Linda
- Mike Tan as Dindo
- Angie Ferro as Josie
- Bon Vivar as Manuel
- Vincent Magbanua as Abel
- Kiel Rodriguez as Jojo
- Will Ashley de Leon as Joshua Banal
- Jayvhot Galang as Rihanna
- Lee Jairus Gulilat as Arida
- Shelly Hipolito as Ruthy
- Joshua Uy as Marky Evangelista
- Ken Alfonso as Ram
- Paul Holmes as Zack
- Julia Lee as Jezza
- Aaron Yanga as Anton
- Tommy Abuel as John
- Jaime Fabregas as Zachary
- Maricel Morales as Alicia
- Carme Sanchez as Maria
- Michael Angelo Lobrin as Stephen
- Mike Jovida as Nehem
- Barbara Miguel as Daniella
- Tanya Gomez as Daniella's mother
- Louise delos Reyes as Beth
- Frencheska Farr as Miriam
- Sheila Marie Rodriguez as Nena
- Francheska Salcedo as Mimay
- Marita Zobel as Conchita Banal
- Odette Khan as Delia Cruz
- Arny Ross as Rhoda
- Marco Alcaraz as Bart
- Andrea Torres as Leila Romero
- Nora Aunor as Lydia del Rosario
- Orlando Sol as Joel del Rosario
- Marian Rivera as a pregnant woman

== Production ==
Principal photography commenced on February 18, 2015.

== Ratings ==
According to AGB Nielsen Philippines' Mega Manila household television ratings, the pilot episode of Pari 'Koy earned a 22.4% rating. The final episode scored a 24.7% rating. The series had its highest rating on August 12, 2015, with a 25.1% rating.

== Accolades ==
Accolades received by Pari 'Koy
Year	Award	Category	Recipient	Result	Ref.
2015	29th PMPC Star Awards for Television	Best Primetime Drama Series	Pari 'Koy	Nominated	

== Legacy ==
In April 2015, Philippine actor Dingdong Dantes appeared in the Philippine television drama series Yagit, portraying the same character he played in Pari 'Koy.
