= Unforgettable (Philippine TV series) =

2013 Philippine television drama series

- Title card
- Genre: Drama; Romantic fantasy
- Developed by: Agnes Gagelonia-Uligan
- Written by: Maribel Ilag; Gilbeys Sardea; Glaiza Ramirez
- Directed by: Gina Alajar
- Creative director: Jun Lana
- Starring: Kylie Padilla
- Theme music composer: Kenjiro Sakiy; Larry Chua
- Opening theme: "Babalikang Muli" by Kyla and Gian Magdangal
- Country of origin: Philippines
- Original language: Tagalog
- No. of episodes: 67

Production
- Executive producer: Darling Pulido Torres
- Production locations: Tagaytay, Philippines; Quezon City, Philippines
- Cinematography: Chiqui Soriano
- Camera setup: Multiple-camera setup
- Running time: 30–45 minutes
- Production company: GMA Entertainment TV

Original release
- Network: GMA Network
- Release: February 25 – May 31, 2013

Unforgettable is a 2013 Philippine television drama romantic fantasy series broadcast by GMA Network. Directed by Gina Alajar, it stars Kylie Padilla. It premiered on February 25, 2013 on the network's Afternoon Prime line up. The series concluded on May 31, 2013, with a total of 67 episodes.

== Cast and characters ==
Cast

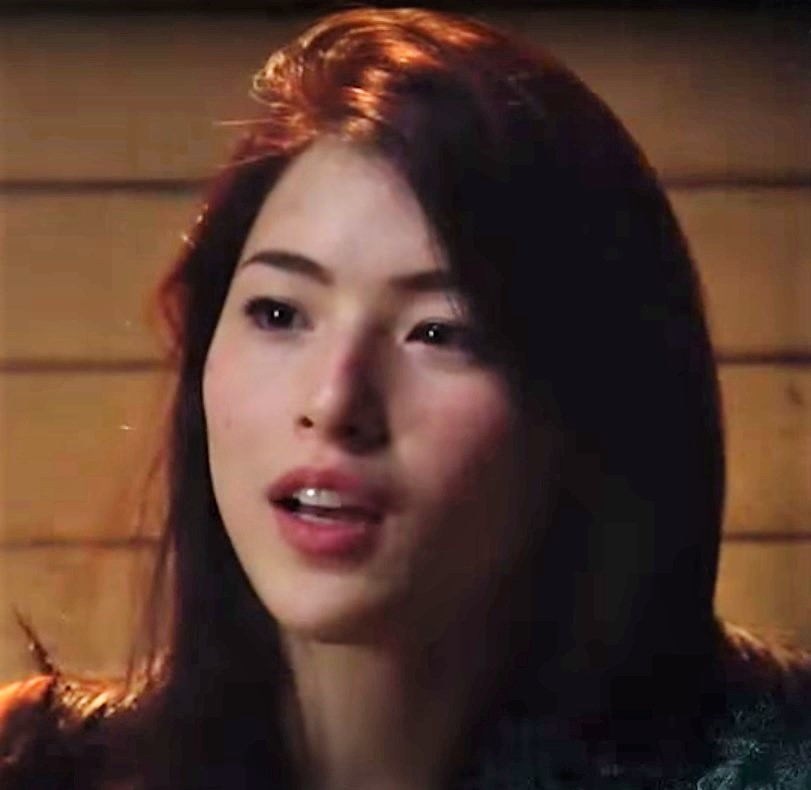
Kylie Padilla

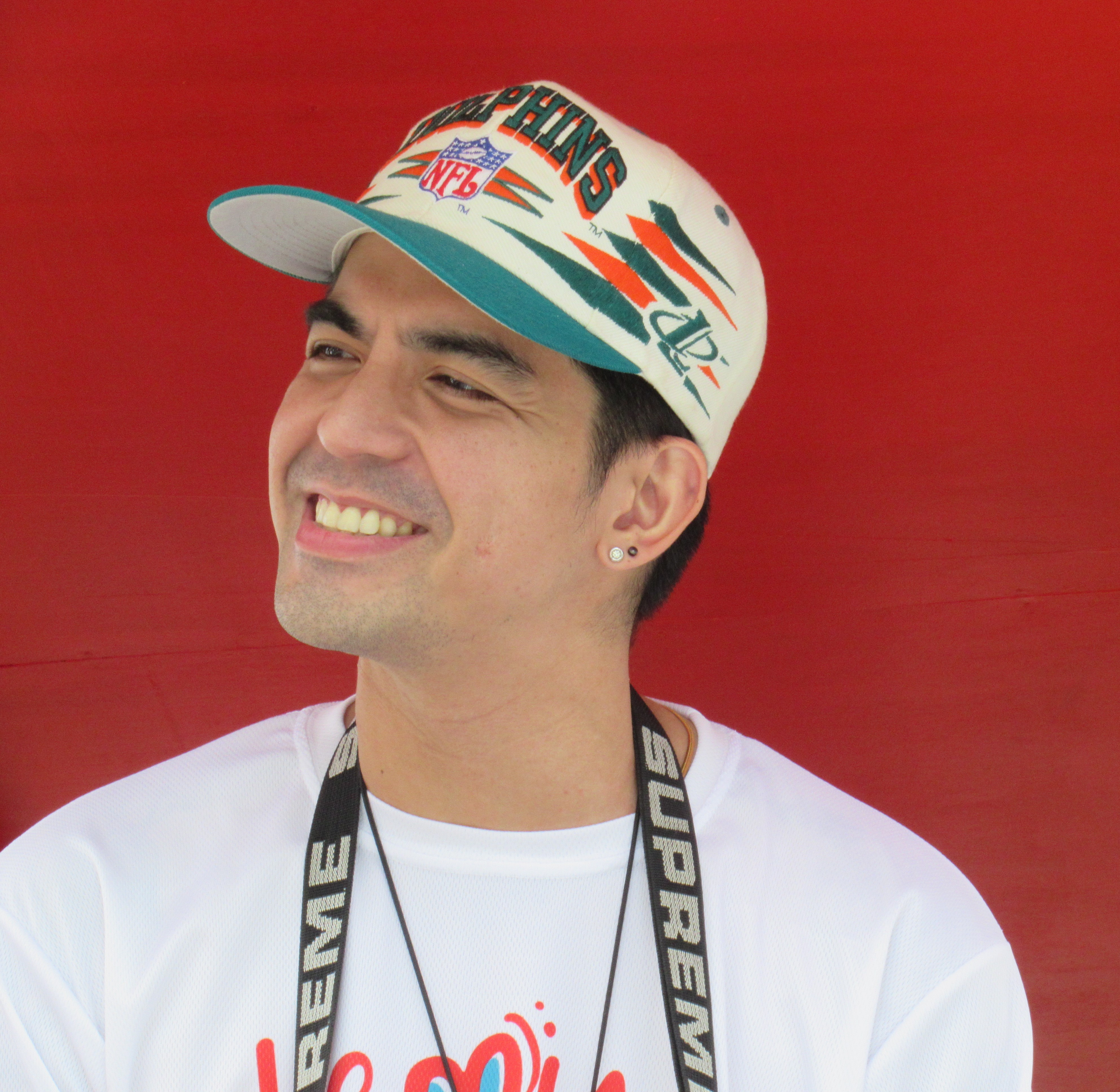
Mark Herras

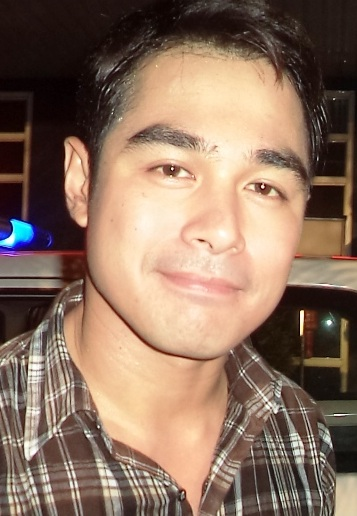
Benjamin Alves

Lead cast

- Kylie Padilla as Rosanna "Anna" Caruhatan

Supporting cast

- Mark Herras as Eduardo "Ed" Manalastas
- Benjamin Alves as Miguel de Ocampo
- Pauleen Luna as Constance "Connie" de Ocampo
- Phillip Salvador as Manuel de Ocampo
- Polo Ravales as Arnold Regalado
- Glydel Mercado as Elvira Caruhatan
- Carmi Martin as Consuelo "Concha" de Ocampo
- Timmy Cruz as Raymunda "Munding" Manalastas

Recurring cast

- Chariz Solomon as Ruth Natividad
- Roy Alvarez as Salvador "Badong" Leoncio
- Kevin Santos as Randy Legaspi
- Pancho Magno as Darwin Toledo
- Rocco Nacino as Terrence Rosario
- Bianca Umali as Julia Regalado
- Lenlen Frial as Elai
- Jana Trites as Isabel

== Development ==
The series was created and developed by Agnes Gagelonia-Uligan. She began developing the series late 2012. The series, which slated for 16-week run, was under the direction of Gina Alajar. Darling Pulido-Torres served as the executive producer.

=== Casting ===
The majority of the cast was assembled in late January 2013. Lauren Young was the original choice of the network for the character of Anna Caruhatan, but was replaced by Kylie Padilla in the final casting. Mark Herras and Pauleen Luna, were hired for the roles of Ed Manalastas and Connie de Ocampo, respectively. Benjamin Alves was chosen to portray the character of Atty. Miguel de Ocampo. Alves described his role as "a dream come true," as he wanted to be a lawyer in real life. Glydel Mercado took the role of Elvira Caruhatan which was previously offered to Jean Garcia.

Philip Salvador signed on to portray the series' antagonist Atty. Manuel de Ocampo. Carmi Martin took the role of Concha de Ocampo, which was initially offered to actress Agot Isidro.

== Ratings ==
According to AGB Nielsen Philippines' Mega Manila household television ratings, the pilot episode of Unforgettable earned a 16.5% rating. The final episode scored a 14.1% rating.
