= Mark Herras =

Filipino actor (born 1986)

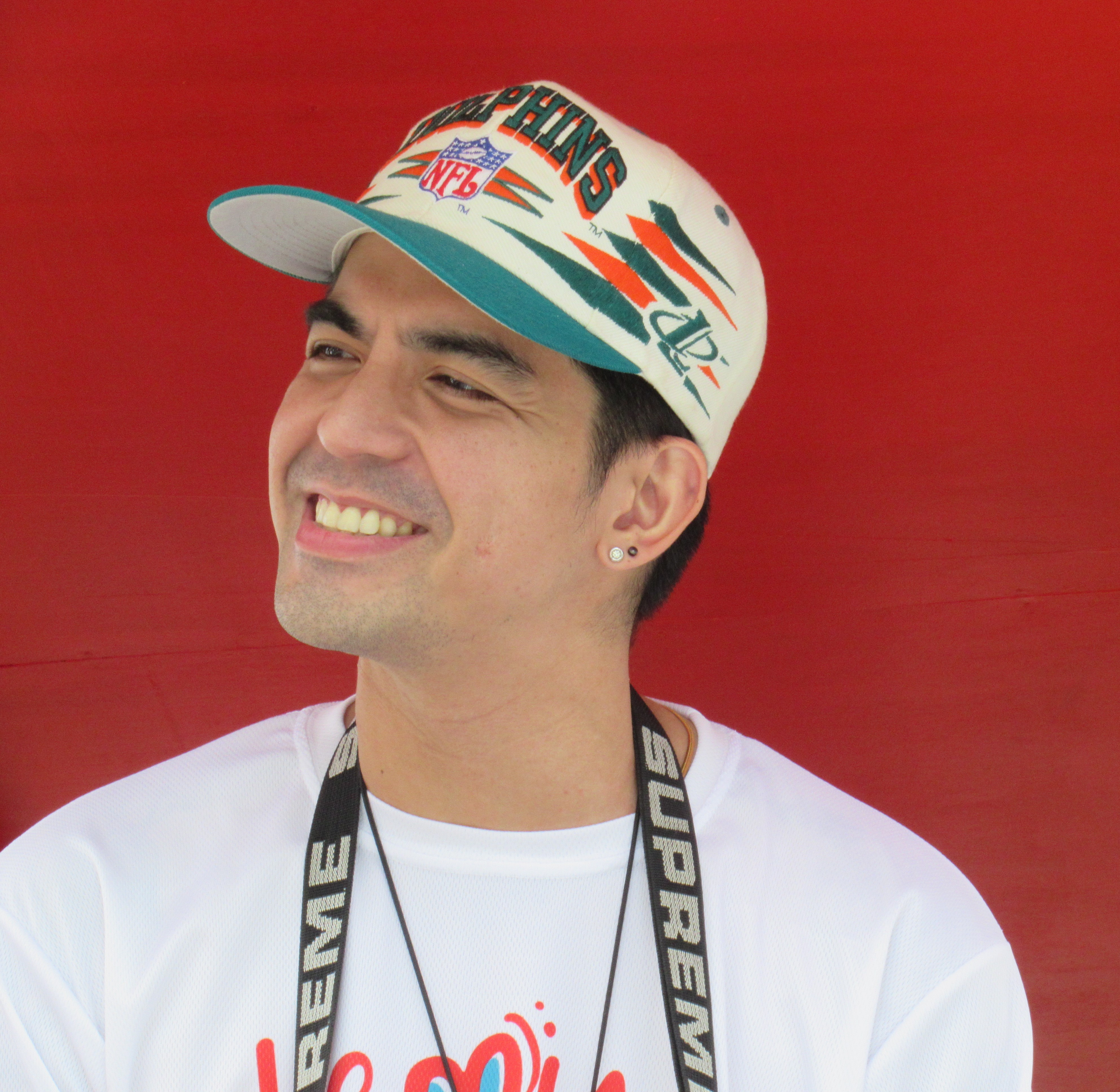
- Herras at the Santiago Apostol de Quingua Salubong Festival 2021
- Born: Mark Angelo Santos Herras; December 14, 1986 (age 39); Santa Rosa, Laguna, Philippines
- Occupations: Actor, dancer, model, choreographer, comedian, singer
- Years active: 2003–present
- Spouse: Nicole Kim Donesa (m. 2021)
- Children: 2

Mark Angelo Santos Herras (born December 14, 1986) is a Filipino actor. Mark Herras won in the reality talent show StarStruck aired in GMA Network. He also appeared in Forever in My Heart, Encantadia, SOP, and played one of the three main protagonists in I Luv NY and one of the two lead roles in Artikulo 247.

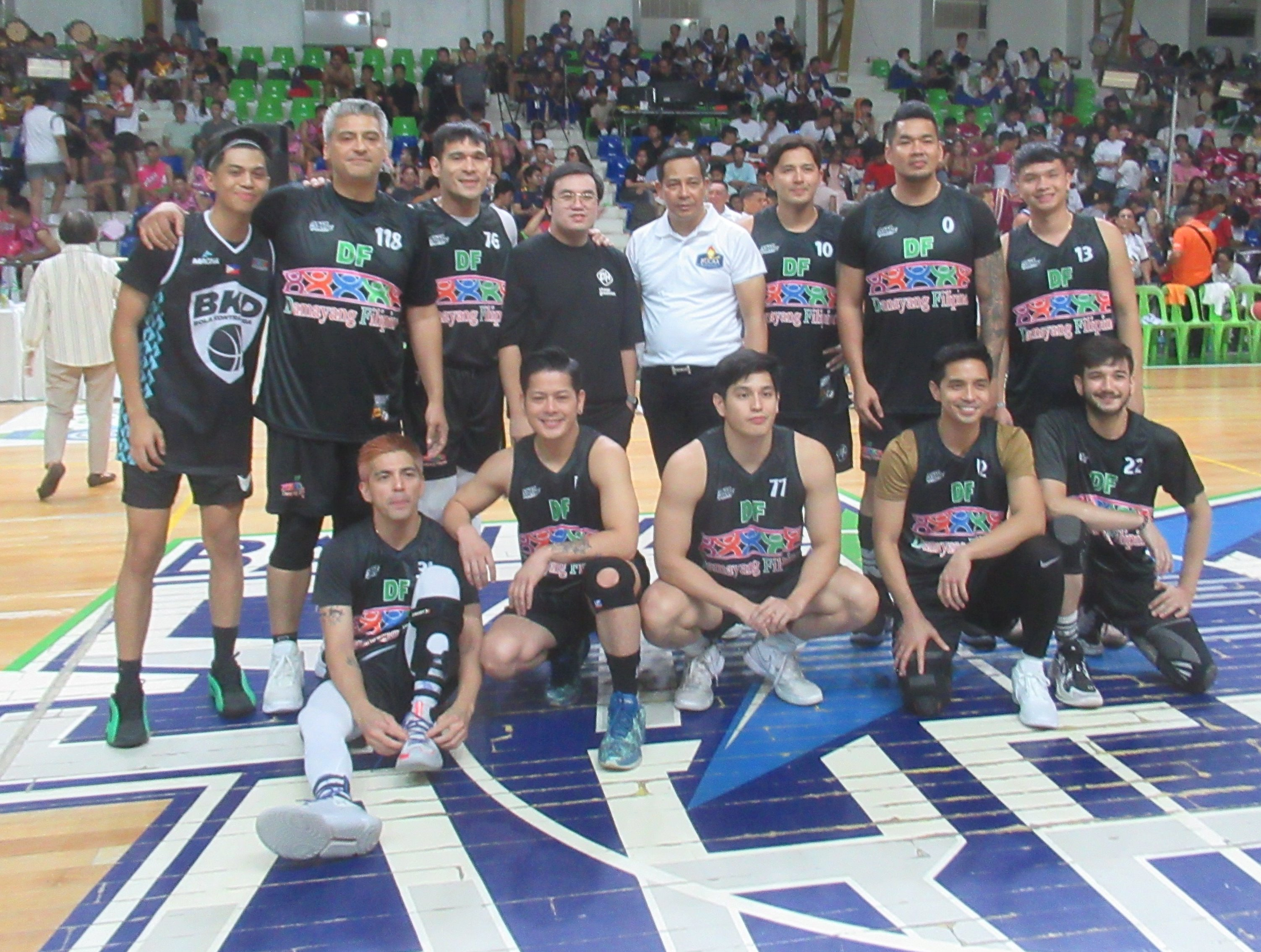
Herras in BUCAA basketball tournament

== Career ==
After winning the reality show StarStruck in 2003, Herras secured Lolit Solis as his talent manager, showcasing his dancing talent through numerous performances across the Philippines. He also appeared on the popular Sunday variety show SOP, paving his way into the entertainment industry. Expanding his career, Mark ventured into acting alongside fellow winner Jennylyn Mercado, starring in various GMA Network shows and the successful film So Happy Together, which featured other StarStruck alumni and achieved impressive box-office results. His endorsement deals with brands like Smart and Silverworks further established him as a notable celebrity in the Philippines.

In 2005, Herras and Jennylyn's on-screen romance blossomed with their film debut in Say That You Love Me, followed by successful collaborations, including their major hit Let the Love Begin. This solidified their status as one of the country's beloved loveteams, competing alongside other popular pairs in local cinema.

In 2007, Herras both actors pursued solo careers, leading to Mark starring in the action-comedy series Fantastic Man, which marked a significant step forward in his acting portfolio. He continued to land notable roles, appearing in primetime dramas like Mga Mata ni Anghelita.

In 2008, Herras had the honor of acting alongside his idol Robin Padilla in Joaquin Bordado, where he played the character of Robin's rebellious brother. Despite his newfound fame, the public's fascination with his loveteam with Jennylyn persisted, leading to the creation of their own show, Sine Novela: Paano Ba Ang Mangarap? in 2009. The remake of a classic film became a top-rated daytime series, underscoring the enduring appeal of their partnership. That year also featured Mark in the drama series Ikaw Sana, further solidifying his presence in Philippine television.

In 2010, Herras continued to immerse himself in various projects, including drama series Diva, where he showcased his versatility alongside a new love interest, Ynna Asistio. He also took on hosting duties for Party Pilipinas. Reflecting on his busy year, he noted, Collaboration brings out the best in me. Furthermore, his role in Langit Sa Piling Mo alongside Heart Evangelista highlighted his growing prominence in the industry. Adding to his acclaim, he co-hosted the reality talent show Danz Showdown and participated in the holiday special Puso ng Pasko: Artista Challenge.

In 2011, Herras returns to prime-time drama series in Patrick Galves made a notable impression by portraying the role of Time of My Life, with his newest leading lady Kris Bernal.

In 2012, Herras returns to afternoon drama series in Hiram na Puso, with returning partner co-former Starstruck alumni Kris Bernal.

In 2013, Herras played the role of Eduardo "Ed" Manalastas in Unforgettable. He later became a host and performer on the variety show Sunday All Stars.

In 2014, Herras became he was seen to prime-time drama series in Joaquin Vasquez played the role of Rhodora X, which was topbilled by his former love team Jennylyn Mercado.

In 2015, his wishes came true when he was cast alongside his Janine Gutierrez in the romantic fantasy series in the role of Sebastian "Baste" Espinoza in Dangwa, while Peter Parker Batongbuhay his performance in the role of Little Nanay.

In 2016, Herras leads to situational comedy series in the role of Conan in Conan, My Beautician, Jonas Mercado took on the significant role of Sa Piling ni Nanay with Yasmien Kurdi and Katrina Halili.

In 2017, Herras continues to drama series, Carlos "Caloy" Tolentino in D' Originals supporting role with Jaclyn Jose, LJ Reyes and Kim Domingo.

In 2018, Herras went back on Telebabad in his notable the role of Darius in The Cure with Jennylyn Mercado and Tom Rodriguez.

In 2019, Herras leading turns to afternoon drama series in Larry Pineda in Bihag with Max Collins.

In 2022, Herras is set to portrayed his role in Elijah Borromeo in Artikulo 247 with Rhian Ramos and Kris Bernal. In 2023, Herras played Zachary "Zach" in the role of Unica Hija with Kate Valdez.

== Personal life ==
Ynna Asistio and Herras were partners since 2008 until their breakup in 2013. Herras married Nicole Kim Donesa in 2020. The couple have a son and daughter.

== Filmography ==
=== Films ===
| Year | Title | Role | Notes |
|---|---|---|---|
| 2004 | So Happy Together | Xander | |
| 2005 | Let the Love Begin | Luigi | |
| 2005 | Say That You Love Me | Stephen | |
| 2005 | Lovestruck | Caloy | |
| 2006 | Blue Moon | Young Manuel | Special Participation |
| 2006 | Eternity | Cholo | |
| 2006 | Super Noypi | Lorenzo Valdez | |
| 2007 | Tiyanaks | Christian | |
| 2007 | Sapi | Mario | |
| 2007 | Bahay Kubo | Jake | |
| 2008 | I.T.A.L.Y. | Nathan | |
| 2011 | Tween Academy: Class of 2012 | Cameo | |
| 2012 | Hitman | Alvin | |
| 2013 | Coming Soon | Cameo | Mindie film |
| 2016 | Mrs. | | Sinag Maynila Film Festival entry |

=== Television ===
| Year | Title | Role |
|---|---|---|
| 2003–2004 | StarStruck (season 1) | Himself / Ultimate Male Survivor |
| 2004 | SOP Gigsters | Himself / Survivor |
| 2004 | Love to Love Season 3: Duet For Love | Stevie |
| 2004 | CLICK Barkada Hunt | Migz |
| 2004 | Click | Migz |
| 2004 | Stage 1: The StarStruck Playhouse and Stage 1: LIVE! | Himself |
| 2004–2010 | SOP | Himself / Host |
| 2004–2005 | Forever in My Heart | Chris Sagrado |
| 2004–2005 | Joyride | Joeyboy Dela Cruz |
| 2005 | Encantadia | Anthony |
| 2005 | Love to Love Season 7: Love Ko Urok | Urok |
| 2006 | Love to Love Season 12: Jass Got Lucky | Genie Marco |
| 2006 | Hongkong Flight 143 | Bogz |
| 2006 | Love to Love Season 10: My Darling Mermaid | Ariel |
| 2006 | I Luv NY | Sebastian "Baste" Santos |
| 2007 | Princess Charming | Inoy Santos |
| 2007 | Fantastic Man | Fantastic Man / Fredo |
| 2007 | Mga Mata ni Anghelita | Abel |
| 2007 | Bubble Gang | Any Name |
| 2007 | Mga Kuwento ni Lola Basyang | Various |
| 2007 | Boys Nxt Door | Zeki |
| 2007 | La Vendetta | Galo Alumpihit |
| 2007–2008 | Sine Novela: My Only Love | Billy Soriano |
| 2008 | Joaquin Bordado | Jason Apacible / Andre |
| 2008 | Dear Friend | Alex |
| 2008–2009 | Luna Mystika | Kamilo |
| 2009 | Sine Novela: Paano Ba Ang Mangarap? | Eric Valderama |
| 2009 | Dear Friend: Bakasyonistas | Alex |
| 2009–2010 | Ikaw Sana | Michael Olivarez |
| 2009–2010 | Starstruck V | Himself / Host |
| 2010 | Diva | Smith Fernandez |
| 2010–2013 | Party Pilipinas | Himself / Co-Host |
| 2010 | Langit sa Piling Mo | Rodrigo "Rigo" Hilario, III |
| 2010 | Danz Showdown | Himself / Host |
| 2010 | Jillian: Namamasko Po | Bart |
| 2010 | Puso ng Pasko: Artista Challenge | Challenger |
| 2011 | Spooky Nights: Singil | JC |
| 2011 | Time of My Life | Patrick Galves |
| 2012 | Hiram na Puso | Prince |
| 2012 | Luna Blanca (book 3) | Aki Alvarez |
| 2012 | Magpakailanman: The Tani-Gloria Story | Young Nathaniel "Mang Tani" Cruz |
| 2013 | Unforgettable | Eduardo "Ed" Manalastas |
| 2013 | The Ryzza Mae Show | Himself / Guest |
| 2013 | Magpakailanman: The Rez-Candy Story | Rez Cortez |
| 2013 | Maynila: Haunted House of Love | Dux |
| 2013–2015 | Sunday All Stars | Himself / Performer |
| 2014 | Rhodora X | Joaquin Vasquez |
| 2014 | The Ryzza Mae Show | Himself / Guest with Jennylyn Mercado |
| 2014 | Imbestigador | Flint "Junjun" Toling |
| 2014 | Magpakailanman: Ang Biyudang Nakaitim | Tony |
| 2014 | Yagit | Rodney Estrella |
| 2014 | Boys Ride Out | Himself |
| 2015 | Pari 'Koy | Sandro Gutierrez |
| 2015 | Karelasyon | Daniel |
| 2015 | My Mother's Secret | Migs San Real |
| 2015 | Starstruck VI | Himself / Host |
| 2015–2016 | Dangwa | Sebastian "Baste" Espinoza |
| 2015–2016 | Little Nanay | Peter Parker Batongbuhay |
| 2016 | Wish I May | Andrew Vergara |
| 2016 | Lip Sync Battle Philippines | Contender |
| 2016 | Conan, My Beautician | Conan |
| 2016–2017 | Sa Piling ni Nanay | Jonas Mercado |
| 2016 | Wagas | Jay-R |
| 2017 | Destined to be Yours | Eboy |
| 2017 | D' Originals | Carlos "Caloy" Tolentino |
| 2017 | Road Trip | Himself / Guest |
| 2017 | Love is... | Mark |
| 2018 | Contessa | Marco Caballero |
| 2018 | The Cure | Darius |
| 2019 | Bihag | Larry Pineda |
| 2020 | Descendants of the Sun | Orly |
| 2021 | Dear Uge | Guest |
| 2022 | Artikulo 247 | Elijah Borromeo |
| 2022–2023 | Unica Hija | Zachary "Zach" Rivas |
| 2023 | The Missing Husband | Nicandro "Nick" Lazaro |
| 2024 | Abot-Kamay na Pangarap | Gilbert |
| 2026 | Never Say Die | Francis |
| 2026 | Taskforce Firewall | |

Awards and achievements
| Preceded by New | StarStruck; 2003 (season 1) | Succeeded by Mike Tan |
