= List of Pari 'Koy episodes =

Pari 'Koy is a 2015 Philippine television drama series broadcast by GMA Network. It premiered on the network's Telebabad line up from March 9, 2015 to August 21, 2015, replacing More Than Words.

Mega Manila ratings are provided by AGB Nielsen Philippines.

== Series overview ==
Month	Episodes	Monthly Averages
Month	Episodes	Mega Manila
March 2015	17	21.3%
April 2015	20	20.4%
May 2015	21	19.8%
June 2015	22	19.9%
July 2015	23	20.2%
August 2015	15	22.9%
Total	118	20.8%

== Episodes ==
=== March 2015 ===
Episode		Original air date	Social Media Hashtag	AGB Nielsen Mega Manila Households in Television Homes			Ref.
Episode		Original air date	Social Media Hashtag	Rating	Timeslot Rank	Primetime Rank	Ref.
1	Pilot	March 9, 2015	#PariKoy	22.4%	#1	#2	
2	Mahal ka namin, Pari 'Koy	March 10, 2015	#MahalKaNaminPariKoy	21.8%	#1	#2	
3	Welcome, Pari 'Koy!	March 11, 2015	#WelcomePariKoy	21.9%	#1	#2	
4	Bagong Misyon	March 12, 2015	#PariKoyBagongMisyon	22.3%	#1	#2	
5	Welcome Party	March 13, 2015	#PariKoyWelcomeParty	21.6%	#1	#2	
6	Buhay sa Pinagpala	March 16, 2015	#BuhaySaPinagpala	24.2%	#1	#1	
7	Pag-asa sa Pinagpala	March 17, 2015	#PagasaSaPinagpala	21.2%	#2	#2	
8	Bagong Kabuhayan	March 18, 2015	#PKBagongKabuhayan	21.3%	#1	#2	
9	Pagpapala ni Boss	March 19, 2015	#PagpapalaNiBoss	20.4%	#2	#6	
10	Pangaral ni Pari 'Koy	March 20, 2015	#PangaralNiPariKoy	21.0%	#1	#3	
11	Babaguhin ni Pari 'Koy	March 23, 2015	#BabaguhinNiPariKoy	21.9%	#2	#4	
12	Pinggoy's Past	March 24, 2015	#PKPinggoysPast	22.7%	#1	#2	
13	Ninong Pari 'Koy	March 25, 2015	#NinongPariKoy	20.0%	#2	#5	
14	Pangako ni Pari 'Koy	March 26, 2015	#PangakoNiPariKoy	19.4%	#2	#6	
15	San Agustin Loves Pari 'Koy	March 27, 2015	#SanAgustinLovesPariKoy	19.5%	#2	#5	
16	Angel Pinggoy	March 30, 2015	#PKAngelPinggoy	19.7%	#2	#6	
17	Nasaan ang Korona?	March 31, 2015	#PKNasaanAngKorona	20.7%	#2	#5	

=== April 2015 ===
Episode		Original air date	Social Media Hashtag	AGB Nielsen Mega Manila Households in Television Homes			Ref.
Episode		Original air date	Social Media Hashtag	Rating	Timeslot Rank	Primetime Rank	Ref.
18	Sumuko ka na, Simon!	April 1, 2015	#PKSumukoKaNaSimon	21.2%	#1	#3	
19	Patawad o Hustisya?	April 6, 2015	#PKPatawadOHustisya	18.8%	#2	#6	
20	Bagong Simon	April 7, 2015	#PKBagongSimon	20.5%	#2	#5	
21	Dasal ni Pari 'Koy	April 8, 2015	#DasalNiPariKoy	19.3%	#2	#6	
22	Hiling ni Pinggoy	April 9, 2015	#PKHilingNiPinggoy	18.2%	#2	#5	
23	Paano na si Pinggoy?	April 10, 2015	#PKPaanoNaSiPinggoy	19.2%	#2	#4	
24	Pangako ni Pari 'Koy	April 13, 2015	#PangakoNiPariKoy	22.2%	#1	#3	
25	Pamilya ni Pari 'Koy	April 14, 2015	#PamilyaNiPariKoy	21.7%	#1	#3	
26	Sino si Michelle?	April 15, 2015	#PKSinoSiMichelle	21.2%	#1	#1	
27	Nasaan si Pinggoy?	April 16, 2015	#PKNasaanSiPinggoy	20.3%	#2	#4	
28	Pag-alaga ni Pari 'Koy	April 17, 2015	#PagAlagaNiPariKoy	19.4%	#2	#4	
29	Family Problems	April 20, 2015	#PariKoyFamilyProblems	19.1%	#2	#5	
30	Goodbye, Pinggoy	April 21, 2015	#PKGoodbyePinggoy	21.3%	#1	#4	
31	We miss you, Pinggoy!	April 22, 2015	#PKWeMissYouPinggoy	20.1%	#1	#2	
32	Pinggoy's New Family	April 23, 2015	#PKPinggoysNewFamily	22.0%	#1	#2	
33	Selos kay Pari 'Koy	April 24, 2015	#SelosKayPariKoy	20.4%	#1	#3	
34	Welcome back, Pinggoy!	April 27, 2015	#PKWelcomeBackPinggoy	20.2%	#1	#4	
35	Nabasted ka na ba, Pari 'Koy?	April 28, 2015	#NabastedKaNaBaPariKoy	20.1%	#1	#3	
36	True Love ni Pari 'Koy	April 29, 2015	#TrueLoveNiPariKoy	21.0%	#1	#2	
37	Sinungaling ka, Pari 'Koy!	April 30, 2015	#SinungalingKaPariKoy	22.0%	#1	#1	

=== May 2015 ===
Episode		Original air date	Social Media Hashtag	AGB Nielsen Mega Manila Households in Television Homes			Ref.
Episode		Original air date	Social Media Hashtag	Rating	Timeslot Rank	Primetime Rank	Ref.
38	Sampal kay Pari 'Koy!	May 1, 2015	#SampalKayPariKoy	21.3%	#1	#2	
39	Patawad, Michelle	May 4, 2015	#PKPatawadMichelle	20.2%	#2	#4	
40	Sikreto ni Pinggoy	May 5, 2015	#PKSikretoNiPinggoy	19.3%	#2	#5	
41	Kawawang Pinggoy	May 6, 2015	#PKKawawangPinggoy	19.0%	#2	#4	
42	Hiling ni Pinggoy	May 7, 2015	#PKHilingNiPinggoy	18.7%	#2	#5	
43	Talent Show	May 8, 2015	#PKTalentShow	19.4%	#1	#3	
44	Madam Martha Strikes Again	May 11, 2015	#PKMadamMarthaStrikesAgain	20.5%	#1	#4	
45	Huli ka, Madam!	May 12, 2015	#PKHuliKaMadam	20.9%	#1	#2	
46	Michelle's Story	May 13, 2015	#PKMichellesStory	19.9%	#1	#1	
47	Michelle's Baby	May 14, 2015	#PKMichellesBaby	19.7%	#1	#3	
48	Laban, Noemi!	May 15, 2015	#PKLabanNoemi	19.6%	#1	#2	
49	Happy Birthday, Pinggoy!	May 18, 2015	#PKHappyBirthdayPinggoy	19.9%	#2	#3	
50	Sikreto ni Sam	May 19, 2015	#PKSikretoNiSam	20.0%	#1	#2	
51	Pagmamahal ni Kuya	May 20, 2015	#PKPagmamahalNiKuya	19.4%	#2	#3	
52	Proposal	May 21, 2015	#PKProposal	19.5%	#2	#3	
53	Basagulero	May 22, 2015	#PKBasagulero	19.5%	#2	#3	
54	Ibalik si Father Kokoy	May 25, 2015	#IbalikSiFatherKokoy	20.0%	#2	#3	
55	Anak ni Pari 'Koy	May 26, 2015	#AnakNiPariKoy	19.8%	#2	#2	
56	Nasaan ang anak ko?	May 27, 2015	#PKNasaanAngAnakKo	19.6%	#1	#1	
57	Duda ni Michelle	May 28, 2015	#PKDudaNiMichelle	19.8%	#2	#2	
58	Pari 'Koy, ikaw ang ama!	May 29, 2015	#PariKoyIkawAngAma	19.5%	#1	#2	

=== June 2015 ===
Episode		Original air date	Social Media Hashtag	AGB Nielsen Mega Manila Households in Television Homes			Ref.
Episode		Original air date	Social Media Hashtag	Rating	Timeslot Rank	Primetime Rank	Ref.
59	Ambush kay Pari 'Koy	June 1, 2015	#AmbushKayPariKoy	19.8%	#2	#3	
60	Prayer Vigil for Pari 'Koy	June 2, 2015	#PrayerVigilForPariKoy	21.0%	#1	#1	
61	Answered Prayers	June 3, 2015	#PKAnsweredPrayers	19.3%	#2	#2	
62	Surprise for Pari 'Koy	June 4, 2015	#SurpriseForPariKoy	19.2%	#2	#3	
63	Totoo ba ang Tsismis?	June 5, 2015	#PKTotooBaAngTsismis	20.5%	#2	#3	
64	Anak ko si Pinggoy	June 8, 2015	#PKAnakKoSiPinggoy	19.5%	#2	#3	
65	Iskandalo sa Pinagpala	June 9, 2015	#PKIskandaloSaPinagpala	21.6%	#1	#1	
66	Ang Paliwanag ni Pari 'Koy	June 10, 2015	#AngPaliwanagNiPariKoy	20.6%	#2	#3	
67	Goodbye, Pari 'Koy!	June 11, 2015	#GoodbyePariKoy	17.9%	#2	#3	
68	The Haunted House	June 12, 2015	#PKTheHauntedHouse	19.0%	#2	#3	
69	Sapi kay Sarah	June 15, 2015	#PKSapiKaySarah	21.6%	#1	#1	
70	The Exorcism of Sarah	June 16, 2015	#PKTheExorcismOfSarah	21.9%	#1	#2	
71	Rest in peace, Daniella	June 17, 2015	#PKRestInPeaceDaniella	21.5%	#1	#2	
72	In Love kay Pari 'Koy	June 18, 2015	#InLoveKayPariKoy	19.5%	#1	#2	
73	Obsessed kay Pari 'Koy	June 19, 2015	#ObsessedKayPariKoy	22.1%	#1	#1	
74	Mahal na kita, Pari 'Koy!	June 22, 2015	#MahalNaKitaPariKoy	19.3%	#2	#3	
75	Lumayo ka sa Tukso	June 23, 2015	#PKLumayoKaSaTukso	19.7%	#2	#3	
76	Desperadong Beth	June 24, 2015	#PKDesperadangBeth	18.2%	#2	#3	
77	Arestado si Pari 'Koy	June 25, 2015	#ArestadoSiPariKoy	18.6%	#2	#3	
78	Hustisya para kay Pari 'Koy	June 26, 2015	#HustisyaParaKayPariKoy	19.3%	#2	#3	
79	Pag-unawa kay Beth	June 29, 2015	#PKPagunawaKayBeth	18.6%	#2	#3	
80	Pinggoy, ako ang tatay mo	June 30, 2015	#PKPinggoyAkoAngTatayMo	18.0%	#2	#6	

=== July 2015 ===
Episode		Original air date	Social Media Hashtag	AGB Nielsen Mega Manila Households in Television Homes			Ref.
Episode		Original air date	Social Media Hashtag	Rating	Timeslot Rank	Primetime Rank	Ref.
81	Hiling ni Kap Jude	July 1, 2015	#PKHilingNiKapJude	18.5%	#2	#3	
82	Kalma lang, Kap Jude	July 2, 2015	#PKKalmaLangKapJude	17.6%	#2	#5	
83	Krisis sa Pinagpala	July 3, 2015	#PKKrisisSaPinagpala	19.1%	#2	#4	
84	Salot na Bigas	July 6, 2015	#PKSalotNaBigas	22.3%	#1	#2	
85	Hugas Kamay si Kap	July 7, 2015	#PKHugasKamaySiKap	21.7%	#2	#3	
86	Nasaan ang Ebidensiya	July 8, 2015	#PKNasaanAngEbidensiya	22.3%	#2	#4	
87	Pagluluksa sa Pinagpala	July 9, 2015	#PKPagluluksaSaPinagpala	22.1%	#2	#4	
88	Tulong sa Pinagpala	July 10, 2015	#PKTulongSaPinagpala	21.9%	#1	#2	
89	Hustisya sa Pinagpala	July 13, 2015	#PKHustisyaSaPinagpala	20.0%	#2	#3	
90	Pagsuko ni James	July 14, 2015	#PKPagsukoNiJames	17.8%	#2	#5	
91	Sa Hirap at Ginhawa	July 15, 2015	#PKSaHirapAtGinhawa	19.6%	#2	#3	
92	Ang Tunay na Maysala	July 16, 2015	#PKAngTunayNaMaysala	19.4%	#2	#3	
93	Laban, Joshua!	July 17, 2015	#PKLabanJoshua	19.7%	#2	#4	
94	Desisyon ni Noemi	July 20, 2015	#PKDesisyonNiNoemi	20.0%	#2	#3	
95	Request ni Joshua	July 21, 2015	#PKRequestNiJoshua	18.9%	#2	#4	
96	Pagtatapat ni Michelle	July 22, 2015	#PKPagtatapatNiMichelle	19.9%	#2	#5	
97	Keep the Faith, Michelle!	July 23, 2015	#PKKeepTheFaithMichelle	19.3%	#2	#4	
98	Panalangin ni Pinggoy	July 24, 2015	#PKPanalanginNiPinggoy	20.4%	#2	#3	
99	Pananalig ni Pinggoy	July 27, 2015	#PKPananaligNiPinggoy	20.7%	#2	#4	
100	Bilin ni Michelle	July 28, 2015	#PKBilinNiMichelle	21.9%	#1	#2	
101	Nalalabing Oras	July 29, 2015	#PKNalalabingOras	22.2%	#1	#2	
102	Panalangin ni Kap	July 30, 2015	#PKPanalanginNiKap	21.1%	#1	#2	
103	Paalam, Michelle	July 31, 2015	#PKPaalamMichelle	19.3%	#1	#3	

=== August 2015 ===
Episode		Original air date	Social Media Hashtag	AGB Nielsen Mega Manila Households in Television Homes			Ref.
Episode		Original air date	Social Media Hashtag	Rating	Timeslot Rank	Primetime Rank	Ref.
104	Huling Misa kay Michelle	August 3, 2015	#PKHulingMisaKayMichelle	20.3%	#2	#4	
105	Sino si Leila?	August 4, 2015	#PKSinoSiLeila	20.6%	#1	#2	
106	Sayaw ni Leila	August 5, 2015	#PKSayawNiLeilaWelcomeYulServo	20.1%	#2	#4	
107	Leila vs. Sam	August 6, 2015	#PKLeilaVsSam	22.0%	#1	#2	
108	Motibo ni Leila	August 7, 2015	#PKMotiboNiLeila	21.5%	#1	#3	
109	Kasinungalingan ni Leila	August 10, 2015	#PKKasinungalinganNiLeila	23.4%	#1	#1	
110	Konsensya ni Leila	August 11, 2015	#PKKonsensyaNiLeila	24.5%	#1	#1	
111	Desisyon ni Leila	August 12, 2015	#PKDesisyonNiLeila	25.1%	#1	#1	
112	Buking na si Leila	August 13, 2015	#PKBukingNaSiLeila	24.4%	#1	#1	
113	Pagdating ni Lydia	August 14, 2015	#PKPagdatingNiLydia	22.6%	#1	#1	
114	Pinggoy Meets Lydia	August 17, 2015	#PKPinggoyMeetsLydia	23.5%	#1	#1	
115	Kampanerang Lydia	August 18, 2015	#PKKampanerangLydia	23.5%	#1	#1	
116	Hinagpis ni Lydia	August 19, 2015	#PKHinagpisNiLydia	23.7%	#1	#2	
117	Pari 'Koy and Lydia	August 20, 2015	#PariKoyAndLydia	23.6%	#1	#2	
118	Salamat, Pari 'Koy!	August 21, 2015	#SalamatPariKoy	24.7%	#1	#1	
