= Vincent Magbanua =

Filipino actor

- Born: April 7, 2000 (age 25)
- Occupation: Actor
- Years active: 2013–present
- Agent: GMA Artist Center

Vincent Magbanua is a Filipino actor appearing in films like Palawan Fate and Balut Country. He also appears in the TV show Super Ma'am.

He was born on April 7, 2000. He is also a member of GMA Artist Center. His other projects include Niño, Prinsesa ng Buhay Ko and Indio.

Magbanua is one of the cast of the TV show Juan Happy Love Story, and hails from Palawan. He is part of the TV soap opera Indio where he played the young Bong Revilla. He is also part of the indie film Balut Country. He also made a guest appearance in the TV show Pari 'Koy.

== Filmography ==
Year	Title	Role	Network
2013	Indio	young Indio	GMA Network
2013	Kakambal ni Eliana	young Gabo	GMA Network
2013	Wagas: Walang imposible: Ron and Marygrace Love Story	young Ron	GMA Network
2013–2014	Prinsesa ng Buhay Ko	Vicvic	GMA Network
2013–2014	Magkano Ba Ang Pag-Ibig?	young Lucio	GMA Network
2014	Niño	Matmat	GMA Network
2014	Wattpad Presents	young Prince	TV5
2015	Pari 'Koy	Abel	GMA Network
2016	Juan Happy Love Story	Lucky Villanueva	GMA Network
2017	Daig Kayo ng Lola Ko: Golda and the Three Bears	Baby Bear	GMA Network
2017–2018	Super Ma'am	Eric Gumatay	GMA Network
2018	Magpakailanman: Victim of Bullying	Jason	GMA Network
2018	Tadhana: Masahol Pa sa Hayop	Michael	GMA Network
2018	Daig Kayo ng Lola Ko: Snow White and the Seven Dwarfs	Doc	GMA Network
2018	The Cure	Luis	GMA Network
2019	Beautiful Justice	Dennis Bernardo	GMA Network
2022	The Fake Life	Oyet	GMA Network
2023	Magandang Dilag	young Magnus	GMA Network
