= Danz Showdown =

2010 Philippine television reality show

- Title card
- Genre: Reality competition
- Directed by: Ding Bolanos
- Presented by: Mark Herras; Izzy Trazona
- Country of origin: Philippines
- Original language: Tagalog
- No. of episodes: 65

Production
- Executive producer: Jose Mari Abacan
- Camera setup: Multiple-camera setup
- Running time: 25 minutes
- Production companies: GMA Entertainment TV; FOCUS Entertainment Inc.

Original release
- Network: GMA Network
- Release: July 5 – October 1, 2010

Danz Showdown is a 2010 Philippine television reality competition show broadcast by GMA Network. Hosted by Mark Herras and Izzy Trazona, it premiered on July 5, 2010. The show concluded on October 1, 2010, with a total of 65 episodes.

The winner received ₱500,000.

== Plot ==
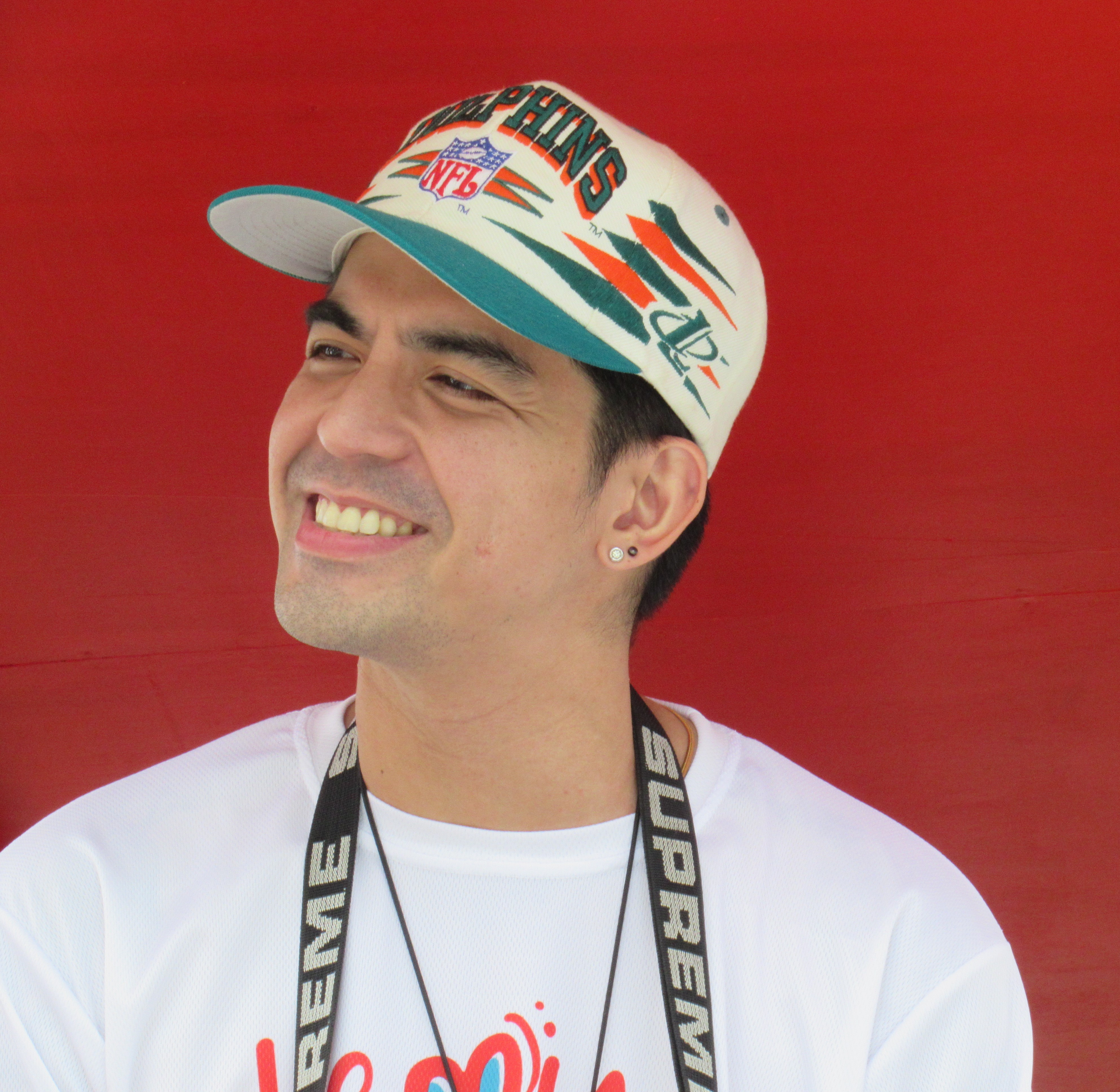
Mark Herras served as the host.

Known for their hits such as "Spaghetti", "Bakit Papa" up to "Bilog na Hugis Itlog", their single which was lauded for playing a major role in GMA-7's Voter Education Campaign. Focus E, Incorporated and GMA Network, in harmony with the group's belief, put together a dance reality show that will not only entertain but more importantly, capture a global quality of dancing. There will be rigorous training, unexpected challenges, various dance themes and a grand prize worth half a million pesos (250, 000 cash and 250,000 worth of contract) –all in the name of selecting and honing the one best dancer. To host the show are no less than the Badboy of the Dance Floor Mark Herras and Sexbomb Diva Izzy Trazona. Since the hopefuls are unavoidably budding showbiz personalities, they will be tested on and off the stage. From Monday to Friday, the sizzling duo of Mark and Izzy will update audiences about their progress, setbacks, personal issues and whatnots. As the hopefuls bust their moves, they will be under the meticulous eye of judges composed of choreographer extraordinaire Maribeth Bechara, Sexbomb leader Rochelle Pangilinan and a surprise guest of the week. The audiences too will determine who deserves to stay via their text votes. Sexbomb guru Joy Cancio and Sexbomb adviser Presley Balili, aside from giving constant moral support, will also help in the first wave of the elimination process. Of course, the show would not be complete without the SexBomb Girls themselves. Together, they will test the hopefuls’ skills and determination by becoming showdown masters who will either teach or compete with the contestants.

== Ratings ==
According to AGB Nielsen Philippines' Mega Manila People/Individual television ratings, the pilot episode of Danz Showdown earned a 3.9% rating. The final episode scored a 3.2% rating.

== Accolades ==
Accolades received by Danz Showdown
Year	Award	Category	Recipient	Result	Ref.
2011	25th PMPC Star Awards for Television	Best Talent Search Program	Danz Showdown	Nominated	
