= List of Yagit episodes =

Yagit is a 2014 Philippine television drama series broadcast by GMA Network. It premiered on the network's Afternoon Prime line up from October 13, 2014 to July 24, 2015, replacing Dading.

Mega Manila ratings are provided by AGB Nielsen Philippines.

== Series overview ==
Month	Episodes	Monthly Averages
Month	Episodes	Mega Manila
October 2014	15	15.1%
November 2014	20	15.0%
December 2014	23	15.5%
January 2015	22	15.6%
February 2015	20	16.2%
March 2015	22	17.4%
April 2015	20	18.6%
May 2015	21	18.6%
June 2015	22	15.9%
July 2015	18	16.9%
Total	203	16.5%

== Episodes ==
=== October 2014 ===
Episode		Original air date	Social Media Hashtag	AGB Nielsen Mega Manila Households in Television Homes			Ref.
Episode		Original air date	Social Media Hashtag	Rating	Timeslot Rank	Daytime Rank	Ref.
1	Pilot	October 13, 2014	#Yagit	17.4%	#1	#3	
2	Dream ng mga Yagit	October 14, 2014	#DreamNgMgaYagit	16.6%	#1	#3	
3	Yagit vs. Flora	October 15, 2014	#YagitVSFlora	14.9%	#1	#3	
4	Yagit Mission	October 16, 2014	#YagitMission	13.4%	#1	#4	
5	Victor is Back	October 17, 2014	#VictorIsBack	14.9%	#1	#4	
6	Good Deeds	October 20, 2014	#YagitGoodDeeds	14.1%	#1	#4	
7	Yagit Meets Victor	October 21, 2014	#YagitMeetsVictor	16.6%	#1	#3	
8	Hay, Tiyang Flora!	October 22, 2014	#HayTiyangFlora	17.5%	#1	#3	
9	Ingat	October 23, 2014	#YagitIngat	15.3%	#1	#4	
10	Panggulo ni Chito	October 24, 2014	#YagitPangguloNiChito	14.2%	#1	#4	
11	Missing Inay	October 27, 2014	#YagitMissingInay	14.2%	#1	#3	
12	Victor Looks for Dolores	October 28, 2014	#VictorLooksForDolores	13.6%	#1	#4	
13	Lukso ng Dugo	October 29, 2014	#LuksoNgDugo	15.3%	#1	#3	
14	Love of a Father	October 30, 2014	#LoveOfAFather	14.9%	#1	#3	
15	Para kay Eliza	October 31, 2014	#ParaKayEliza	14.1%	#1	#3	

=== November 2014 ===
Episode		Original air date	Social Media Hashtag	AGB Nielsen Mega Manila Households in Television Homes			Ref.
Episode		Original air date	Social Media Hashtag	Rating	Timeslot Rank	Daytime Rank	Ref.
16	Oplan Tulungan	November 3, 2014	#OplanTulungan	13.2%	#1	#3	
17	Kawawang Eliza	November 4, 2014	#KawawangEliza	15.2%	#1	#3	
18	Malasakit ng Ama	November 5, 2014	#MalasakitNgAma	15.0%	#1	#3	
19	Mabait si Mang Victor	November 6, 2014	#MabaitSiMangVictor	14.8%	#1	#3	
20	Inosenteng mga Yagit	November 7, 2014	#InosentengMgaYagit	15.4%	#1	#3	
21	Pang-aapi sa mga Yagit	November 10, 2014	#PangaapiSaMgaYagit	14.3%	#1	#3	
22	Matinding Rebelasyon	November 11, 2014	#MatindingRebelasyon	15.4%	#1	#3	
23	Hiwalayan	November 12, 2014	#YagitHiwalayan	14.3%	#1	#3	
24	Pagsubok kay Ding	November 13, 2014	#PagsubokKayDing	15.2%	#1	#3	
25	Dolores vs. Donya Claudia	November 14, 2014	#DoloresVSDonyaClaudia	14.1%	#1	#3	
26	Si Eliza ang Pag-asa	November 17, 2014	#SiElizaAngPagasa	15.3%	#1	#3	
27	Hinala ni Victor	November 18, 2014	#HinalaNiVictor	14.5%	#1	#3	
28	Masakit na Katotohanan	November 19, 2014	#MasakitNaKatotohanan	14.2%	#1	#3	
29	Tulong kay Ding	November 20, 2014	#TulongKayDing	14.6%	#1	#3	
30	Away ng Barkada	November 21, 2014	#AwayNgBarkada	15.8%	#1	#3	
31	Yagit to the Rescue	November 24, 2014	#YagitToTheRescue	14.9%	#1	#3	
32	Dolores True Feelings	November 25, 2014	#DoloresTrueFeelings	16.7%	#1	#3	
33	Away Kaibigan	November 26, 2014	#AwayKaibigan	15.7%	#1	#3	
34	Sakripisyo ni Ding	November 27, 2014	#SakripisyoNiDing	16.5%	#1	#3	
35	Kaya mo 'yan, Eliza!	November 28, 2014	#KayaMoYanEliza	15.3%	#1	#4	

=== December 2014 ===
Episode		Original air date	Social Media Hashtag	AGB Nielsen Mega Manila Households in Television Homes			Ref.
Episode		Original air date	Social Media Hashtag	Rating	Timeslot Rank	Daytime Rank	Ref.
36	Sabwatang Flora at Chito	December 1, 2014	#SabwatangFloraAtChito	14.4%	#1	#3	
37	Love kay Nanay	December 2, 2014	#LoveKayNanay	15.3%	#1	#3	
38	We miss you, Ding!	December 3, 2014	#WeMissYouDing	13.2%	#1	#3	
39	Eliza Saves Ding	December 4, 2014	#ElizaSavesDing	15.3%	#1	#3	
40	Dolores vs. Flora	December 5, 2014	#DoloresVSFlora	16.6%	#1	#3	
41	Babawi si Ding	December 8, 2014	#BabawiSiDing	20.1%	#1	#3	
42	Alam na ni Eliza	December 9, 2014	#AlamNaNiEliza	19.0%	#1	#3	
43	Eliza Accepts the Truth	December 10, 2014	#ElizaAcceptsTheTruth	17.9%	#1	#3	
44	Buhay Ama	December 11, 2014	#BuhayAma	17.6%	#1	#3	
45	Plano ni Victor	December 12, 2014	#PlanoNiVictor	15.5%	#1	#3	
46	Hiling ni Eliza	December 15, 2014	#HilingNiEliza	15.5%	#1	#3	
47	Nasaan ka, Eliza?	December 16, 2014	#NasaanKaEliza	17.0%	#1	#3	
48	Laban ni Dolores	December 17, 2014	#LabanNiDolores	14.3%	#1	#3	
49	Don't lose hope, Dolores	December 18, 2014	#DontLoseHopeDolores	15.9%	#1	#3	
50	Muling Pagsasama	December 19, 2014	#MulingPagsasama	16.3%	#1	#3	
51	Family Day	December 22, 2014	#YagitFamilyDay	16.4%	#1	#3	
52	Panganib kay Eliza	December 23, 2014	#PanganibKayEliza	14.6%	#1	#3	
53	Kidnapping	December 24, 2014	#YagitKidnapping	15.3%	#1	#3	
54	Pag-aalala ng mga Magulang	December 25, 2014	#PagaalalaNgMgaMagulang	12.9%	#1	#3	
55	Oplan Takas	December 26, 2014	#OplanTakas	15.0%	#1	#3	
56	Episode 56	December 29, 2014	#Yagit	13.2%	#1	#3	
57	Episode 57	December 30, 2014	#Yagit	14.1%	#1	#3	
58	Episode 58	December 31, 2014	#Yagit	12.4%	#1	#3	

=== January 2015 ===
Episode		Original air date	Social Media Hashtag	AGB Nielsen Mega Manila Households in Television Homes			Ref.
Episode		Original air date	Social Media Hashtag	Rating	Timeslot Rank	Daytime Rank	Ref.
59	Episode 59	January 1, 2015	#Yagit	17.3%	#1	#3	
60	Episode 60	January 2, 2015	#Yagit	17.2%	#1	#3	
61	Rodney's Good Deed	January 5, 2015	#RodneysGoodDeed	17.0%	#1	#3	
62	Maling Akala	January 6, 2015	#YagitMalingAkala	14.6%	#1	#3	
63	Pakawalan si Eliza	January 7, 2015	#PakawalanSiEliza	14.0%	#1	#3	
64	Sakripisyo ni Rodney	January 8, 2015	#SakripisyoNiRodney	15.7%	#1	#3	
65	Victor's True Love	January 9, 2015	#VictorsTrueLove	15.7%	#1	#3	
66	Together Again	January 12, 2015	#YagitTogetherAgain	15.9%	#1	#3	
67	Pagdududa ni Victor	January 13, 2015	#PagdududaNiVictor	16.1%	#1	#3	
68	Bagong Pagsubok	January 14, 2015	#YagitBagongPagsubok	16.5%	#1	#3	
69	Pagkawalay sa Anak	January 15, 2015	#PagkawalaySaAnak	16.1%	#1	#4	
70	Pangungulila ni Eliza	January 16, 2015	#PangungulilaNiEliza	16.2%	#1	#4	
71	Desisyon ni Dolores	January 19, 2015	#DesisyonNiDolores	14.2%	#1	#4	
72	Change of Heart	January 20, 2015	#ChangeOfHeart	15.0%	#1	#3	
73	A Mother's Sacrifice	January 21, 2015	#AMothersSacrifice	12.8%	#1	#3	
74	Paghihiwalay ng Mag-ina	January 22, 2015	#PaghihiwalayNgMagina	15.4%	#1	#3	
75	A Daughter's Longing	January 23, 2015	#ADaughtersLonging	16.3%	#1	#3	
76	Kakampi o Kaaway?	January 26, 2015	#KakampiOKaaway	14.4%	#1	#4	
77	Mommy o Nanay?	January 27, 2015	#MommyONanay	14.6%	#1	#3	
78	Rex vs. Ronan	January 28, 2015	#RexVsRonan	15.4%	#1	#3	
79	Evil Izel	January 29, 2015	#EvilIzel	17.0%	#1	#3	
80	Yagit Reunited	January 30, 2015	#YagitReunited	15.5%	#1	#3	

=== February 2015 ===
Episode		Original air date	Social Media Hashtag	AGB Nielsen Mega Manila Households in Television Homes			Ref.
Episode		Original air date	Social Media Hashtag	Rating	Timeslot Rank	Daytime Rank	Ref.
81	Kapit lang, Dolores!	February 2, 2015	#KapitLangDolores	17.4%	#1	#2	
82	Malasakit ni Roman	February 3, 2015	#MalasakitNiRoman	14.2%	#1	#3	
83	Tuloy ang Kasal	February 4, 2015	#TuloyAngKasal	15.1%	#1	#3	
84	Save Eliza and Victor	February 5, 2015	#SaveElizaAndVictor	16.6%	#1	#3	
85	Move on na, Dolores	February 6, 2015	#MoveOnNaDolores	17.0%	#1	#4	
86	Ikakasal ka na	February 9, 2015	#IkakasalKaNa	16.8%	#1	#2	
87	Patawad	February 10, 2015	#YagitPatawad	15.6%	#1	#3	
88	Sikretong Pagkikita ng Mag-ina	February 11, 2015	#SikretongPagkikitaNgMagIna	16.7%	#1	#2	
89	Muling Pagtatagpo	February 12, 2015	#MulingPagtatagpo	15.2%	#1	#3	
90	Aamin si Eliza	February 13, 2015	#AaminSiEliza	15.5%	#1	#3	
91	Mapagkumbabang Eliza	February 16, 2015	#MapagkumbabangEliza	15.5%	#1	#3	
92	Rex vs. Victor	February 17, 2015	#RexVsVictor	16.2%	#1	#3	
93	Mapagmahal na Apo	February 18, 2015	#MapagmahalNaApo	16.4%	#1	#3	
94	Si Eliza raw ang Salarin	February 19, 2015	#SiElizaRawAngSalarin	17.0%	#1	#3	
95	Worried si Inay	February 20, 2015	#WorriedSiInay	17.7%	#1	#3	
96	Nagbago si Itay Victor	February 23, 2015	#NagbagoSiItayVictor	17.0%	#1	#3	
97	Pagdurusa ni Eliza	February 24, 2015	#PagdurusaNiEliza	15.0%	#1	#3	
98	Delikado si Ding	February 25, 2015	#DelikadoSiDing	15.9%	#1	#3	
99	Tatakas si Eliza	February 26, 2015	#TatakasSiEliza	16.7%	#1	#3	
100	Away sa Barangay	February 27, 2015	#AwaySaBarangay	16.6%	#1	#3	

=== March 2015 ===
Episode		Original air date	Social Media Hashtag	AGB Nielsen Mega Manila Households in Television Homes			Ref.
Episode		Original air date	Social Media Hashtag	Rating	Timeslot Rank	Daytime Rank	Ref.
101	Palaban si Tiyo Kardo	March 2, 2015	#PalabanSiTiyoKardo	15.8%	#1	#3	
102	Dina, ang mabait na anak	March 3, 2015	#DinaAngMabaitNaAnak	15.7%	#1	#3	
103	Huli ka, Rex!	March 4, 2015	#HuliKaRex	15.4%	#1	#3	
104	Resulta ng Sunog	March 5, 2015	#ResultaNgSunog	17.4%	#1	#3	
105	Inay Dolores vs. Itay Victor	March 6, 2015	#InayDoloresVSItayVictor	16.6%	#1	#3	
106	Pagpuslit kay Eliza	March 9, 2015	#YagitPagpuslitKayEliza	15.4%	#1	#3	
107	Bea Binene on Yagit	March 10, 2015	#BeaBineneOnYagit	16.9%	#1	#3	
108	Kiko Estrada on Yagit	March 11, 2015	#KikoEstradaOnYagit	18.8%	#1	#3	
109	Jam and Pipo Help Eliza	March 12, 2015	#JamPipoHelpEliza	18.8%	#1	#3	
110	Stay Strong, Dolores!	March 13, 2015	#StayStrongDolores	18.1%	#1	#3	
111	Panganib sa Yagit	March 16, 2015	#PanganibSaYagit	16.5%	#1	#3	
112	Banta ni Rex	March 17, 2015	#BantaNiRex	16.8%	#1	#3	
113	Walang Kawala	March 18, 2015	#YagitWalangKawala	17.5%	#1	#3	
114	Eliza and Jam Together Again	March 19, 2015	#ElizaJamTogetherAgain	16.3%	#1	#3	
115	Eliza and Jam in Danger	March 20, 2015	#ElizaJamInDanger	17.0%	#1	#3	
116	Pasabog na Rebelasyon	March 23, 2015	#PasabogNaRebelasyon	18.2%	#1	#3	
117	Sikreto ni Rex	March 24, 2015	#SikretoNiRex	18.5%	#1	#3	
118	Paano na si Eliza?	March 25, 2015	#PaanonNaSiEliza	20.0%	#1	#2	
119	Lagot ka, Chito!	March 26, 2015	#LagotKaChito	18.3%	#1	#3	
120	Alessandra de Rossi on Yagit	March 27, 2015	#AlessandraDeRossiOnYagit	18.1%	#1	#3	
121	Bagong Nanay	March 30, 2015	#BagongNanay	17.6%	#1	#3	
122	Panganib kay Eliza	March 31, 2015	#PanganibKayEliza	18.2%	#1	#3	

=== April 2015 ===
Episode		Original air date	Social Media Hashtag	AGB Nielsen Mega Manila Households in Television Homes			Ref.
Episode		Original air date	Social Media Hashtag	Rating	Timeslot Rank	Daytime Rank	Ref.
123	Selos ni Flora kay Dolores	April 1, 2015	#SelosNiFloraKayDolores	19.2%	#1	#3	
124	Magkakahiwalay na Buhay	April 6, 2015	#MagkakahiwalayNaBuhay	17.1%	#1	#3	
125	Don't give up, Inay Dolores!	April 7, 2015	#DontGiveUpInayDolores	18.2%	#1	#3	
126	Kapit, Itay Victor	April 8, 2015	#KapitItayVictor	16.7%	#1	#3	
127	Wala nang Eliza	April 9, 2015	#WalaNangEliza	17.1%	#1	#3	
128	Good vs. Evil	April 10, 2015	#GoodVSEvil	17.5%	#1	#3	
129	Lumiliit na Mundo	April 13, 2015	#LumiliitNaMundo	16.9%	#1	#3	
130	Kalungkutan ni Dolores	April 14, 2015	#KalungkutanNiDolores	17.3%	#1	#3	
131	Eliza Remembers	April 15, 2015	#ElizaRemembers	17.6%	#1	#3	
132	Eliza is Back	April 16, 2015	#ElizaIsBack	20.7%	#1	#2	
133	Tampuhan ng Magkapatid	April 17, 2015	#TampuhanNgMagkapatid	18.7%	#1	#2	
134	Victor Meets Lulu	April 20, 2015	#VictorMeetsLulu	18.7%	#1	#2	
135	Lukso ng Dugo	April 21, 2015	#YagitLuksoNgDugo	19.4%	#1	#1	
136	Sanib Pwersa	April 22, 2015	#YagitSanibPwersa	18.8%	#1	#3	
137	Lagot ka, Lulu!	April 23, 2015	#LagotKaLulu	21.3%	#1	#2	
138	Puro Panganib	April 24, 2015	#PuroPanganib	21.7%	#1	#2	
139	Away Magulang	April 27, 2015	#AwayMagulang	20.0%	#1	#2	
140	Sakripisyo ni Dolores	April 28, 2015	#SakripisyoNiDolores	19.2%	#1	#3	
141	Reunited ang mga Yagit	April 29, 2015	#ReunitedAngMgaYagit	17.9%	#1	#3	
142	Yagit Meets Pari 'Koy	April 30, 2015	#YagitMeetsPariKoy	18.7%	#1	#2	

=== May 2015 ===
Episode		Original air date	Social Media Hashtag	AGB Nielsen Mega Manila Households in Television Homes			Ref.
Episode		Original air date	Social Media Hashtag	Rating	Timeslot Rank	Daytime Rank	Ref.
143	Shocking Confession	May 1, 2015	#ShockingConfession	16.7%	#1	#3	
144	Catfight of the Century	May 4, 2015	#CatfightOfTheCentury	18.2%	#1	#2	
145	Tiis-tiis lang, Dolores!	May 5, 2015	#TiisTiisLangDolores	19.4%	#1	#2	
146	Izel on Fire	May 6, 2015	#YagitIzelOnFire	18.8%	#1	#2	
147	Pipo's Confession	May 7, 2015	#PiposConfession	18.3%	#1	#2	
148	Malditang Madrasta	May 8, 2015	#MalditangMadrasta	19.1%	#1	#2	
149	Karma ni Izel	May 11, 2015	#KarmaNiIzel	19.3%	#1	#3	
150	One More Chance	May 12, 2015	#YagitOneMoreChance	17.7%	#1	#2	
151	Separate Lives	May 13, 2015	#YagitSeparateLives	16.9%	#1	#2	
152	Panibagong Panganib	May 14, 2015	#PanibagongPanganib	17.9%	#1	#2	
153	May Mawawala	May 15, 2015	#MayMawawala	18.1%	#1	#2	
154	Ang Paniningil	May 18, 2015	#Yagit	17.1%	#1	#3	
155	There is hope, Jam!	May 19, 2015	#ThereIsHopeJam	18.7%	#1	#2	
156	Panlilinlang sa mga Yagit	May 20, 2015	#PanlilinlangSaMgaYagit	18.8%	#1	#2	
157	Naiipit si Eliza	May 21, 2015	#NaiipitSiEliza	18.2%	#1	#2	
158	Ang Katotohanan	May 22, 2015	#YagitAngKatotohanan	18.8%	#1	#2	
159	The Breakdown of a Marriage	May 25, 2015	#TheBreakdownOfAMarriage	18.3%	#1	#1	
160	Laban para sa Karapatan	May 26, 2015	#LabanParaSaKarapatan	21.5%	#1	#1	
161	Ina o Asawa?	May 27, 2015	#YagitInaOAsawa	20.2%	#1	#2	
162	The Fall of the Guisons	May 28, 2015	#TheFallOfTheGuisons	20.9%	#1	#2	
163	Lulu Back from the Dead	May 29, 2015	#LuluBackFromTheDead	18.6%	#1	#2	

=== June 2015 ===
Episode		Original air date	Social Media Hashtag	AGB Nielsen Mega Manila Households in Television Homes			Ref.
Episode		Original air date	Social Media Hashtag	Rating	Timeslot Rank	Daytime Rank	Ref.
164	Jam in Danger	June 1, 2015	#JamInDanger	16.8%	#1	#3	
165	Pagdududa	June 2, 2015	#YagitPagdududa	18.1%	#1	#2	
166	Namatay sa Selfie	June 3, 2015	#YagitNamataySaSelfie	17.2%	#1	#3	
167	Malungkot na Pamamaalam	June 4, 2015	#MalungkotNaPamamaalam	18.2%	#1	#2	
168	Balot ng Kalungkutan	June 5, 2015	#BalotNgKalungkutan	16.7%	#1	#3	
169	Bangungot	June 8, 2015	#YagitBangungot	14.1%	#1	#3	
170	Pangamba ng mga Yagit	June 9, 2015	#PangambaNgMgaYagit	17.5%	#1	#2	
171	Buking si Flora	June 10, 2015	#BukingSiFlora	15.3%	#1	#3	
172	Pagmamahal ni Tay Kardo	June 11, 2015	#PagmamahalNiTayKardo	15.2%	#1	#3	
173	Eliza's Sacrifice	June 12, 2015	#ElizasSacrifice	17.3%	#1	#4	
174	Kardo and Eliza Join Forces	June 15, 2015	#KardoElizaJoinForces	15.3%	#1	#3	
175	Kagimbal-gimbal na Aksidente	June 16, 2015	#KagimbalgimbalNaAksidente	16.8%	#1	#3	
176	Guisons in Danger	June 17, 2015	#GuisonsInDanger	16.0%	#1	#3	
177	Agaw-Buhay	June 18, 2015	#YagitAgawBuhay	14.7%	#1	#3	
178	Goodbye, Itay Kardo	June 19, 2015	#GoodbyeItayKardo	14.8%	#1	#3	
179	Flora vs. Dolores	June 22, 2015	#FloraVsDolores	15.3%	#1	#3	
180	Friendship Over	June 23, 2015	#YagitFriendshipOver	15.5%	#1	#3	
181	Away Barkada	June 24, 2015	#YagitAwayBarkada	15.7%	#1	#3	
182	Tampo kay Dolores	June 25, 2015	#TampoKayDolores	15.0%	#1	#3	
183	Hiwa-hiwalay na mga Yagit	June 26, 2015	#HiwaHiwalayNaMgaYagit	15.1%	#1	#3	
184	Tuloy ang laban, Eliza!	June 29, 2015	#TuloyAngLabanEliza	14.7%	#1	#3	
185	Masamang Balak	June 30, 2015	#YagitMasamangBalak	14.3%	#1	#3	

=== July 2015 ===
Episode		Original air date	Social Media Hashtag	AGB Nielsen Mega Manila Households in Television Homes			Ref.
Episode		Original air date	Social Media Hashtag	Rating	Timeslot Rank	Daytime Rank	Ref.
186	Pangamba ni Dolores	July 1, 2015	#PangambaNiDolores	13.6%	#1	#3	
187	Frenemy	July 2, 2015	#YagitFrenemy	13.2%	#1	#3	
188	Kaibigan o Kaaway?	July 3, 2015	#YagitKaibiganOKaaway	14.3%	#1	#3	
189	Hinala ni Roman	July 6, 2015	#HinalaNiRoman	18.2%	#1	#3	
190	Pagbawi sa mga Yagit	July 7, 2015	#PagbawiSaMgaYagit	16.3%	#1	#3	
191	Yagit in Trouble	July 8, 2015	#YagitInTrouble	17.2%	#1	#3	
192	Izel vs. Victor	July 9, 2015	#IzelVsVictor	17.5%	#1	#3	
193	Dolores in Danger	July 10, 2015	#DoloresInDanger	17.6%	#1	#3	
194	Rebelasyon ni Victor	July 13, 2015	#RebelasyonNiVictor	15.5%	#1	#3	
195	Bingit ng Kamatayan	July 14, 2015	#BingitNgKamatayan	15.6%	#1	#3	
196	Para sa Pamilya	July 15, 2015	#ParaSaPamilya	16.3%	#1	#3	
197	Sinungaling ka, Flora!	July 16, 2015	#SinungalingKaFlora	17.3%	#1	#3	
198	Desperate Move	July 17, 2015	#YagitDesperateMove	16.8%	#1	#3	
199	Dolores, will you marry me?	July 20, 2015	#DoloresWillYouMarryMe	16.9%	#1	#3	
200	Guison Resbak	July 21, 2015	#GuisonResbak	18.3%	#1	#3	
201	Paniningil ni Victor	July 22, 2015	#PaniningilNiVictor	19.8%	#1	#3	
202	Mga Kontra sa Bida	July 23, 2015	#MgaKontraSaBida	18.2%	#1	#3	
203	Love for All	July 24, 2015	#YagitLoveForAll	21.5%	#1	#2	
