= List of Little Nanay episodes =

Little Nanay is a 2015 Philippine television drama series broadcast by GMA Network. It premiered on the network's Telebabad line up and worldwide on GMA Pinoy TV from November 16, 2015 to March 23, 2016, replacing My Faithful Husband on Beautiful Strangers timeslot.

Mega Manila ratings are provided by AGB Nielsen Philippines.

== Series overview ==
Month	Episodes	Monthly Averages
Month	Episodes	Mega Manila
November 2015	11	22.7%
December 2015	23	22.8%
January 2016	21	21.5%
February 2016	21	22.2%
March 2016	17	23.4%
Total	93	22.5%

== Episodes ==
=== November 2015 ===
Episode		Original air date	Social Media Hashtag	AGB Nielsen Mega Manila Households in Television Homes			Ref.
Episode		Original air date	Social Media Hashtag	Rating	Timeslot Rank	Primetime Rank	Ref.
1	Happy Lang!	November 16, 2015	#LittleNanayHappyLang	22.7%	#1	#4	
2	Lola Annie	November 17, 2015	#LittleNanayLolaAnnie	21.9%	#1	#3	
3	Batongbuhays	November 18, 2015	#LittleNanayBatongbuhays	22.0%	#2	#5	
4	Bestfriends	November 19, 2015	#LittleNanayBestfriends	22.7%	#2	#5	
5	Kalma Lang	November 20, 2015	#LittleNanayKalmaLang	25.0%	#1	#2	
6	Bagong Sakal	November 23, 2015	#LittleNanayBagongSakal	23.4%	#1	#3	
7	Biglang Takas	November 24, 2015	#LittleNanayBiglangTakas	22.0%	#1	#3	
8	Positive	November 25, 2015	#LittleNanayPositive	21.4%	#1	#4	
9	Bagong Buhay	November 26, 2015	#LittleNanayBagongBuhay	23.1%	#1	#3	
10	Excited Much	November 27, 2015	#LittleNanayExcitedMuch	24.0%	#1	#2	
11	Little Nanay na si Tinay	November 30, 2015	#LittleNanayNaSiTinay	21.5%	#1	#4	

=== December 2015 ===
Episode		Original air date	Social Media Hashtag	AGB Nielsen Mega Manila Households in Television Homes			Ref.
Episode		Original air date	Social Media Hashtag	Rating	Timeslot Rank	Primetime Rank	Ref.
12	Fantastic Baby	December 1, 2015	#LNFantasticBaby	23.5%	#1	#3	
13	Pray Before Sleep	December 2, 2015	#LNPrayBeforeSleep	24.2%	#1	#1	
14	Pamilya Over GF	December 3, 2015	#LNPamilyaOverGF	25.6%	#1	#3	
15	Tinay Vs. Beatrice	December 4, 2015	#LNTinayVsBeatrice	24.1%	#1	#2	
16	Family Goals	December 7, 2015	#LNFamilyGoals	24.9%	#1	#2	
17	Worried si Lolay	December 8, 2015	#LNWorriedSiLolay	26.0%	#1	#2	
18	Love ni Nanay	December 9, 2015	#LNLoveNiNanay	23.2%	#1	#2	
19	Batongbuhay Meets Vallejos	December 10, 2015	#LNBatongbuhayMeetsVallejos	24.1%	#1	#2	
20	Clash of Clans	December 11, 2015	#LNClashOfClans	23.4%	#1	#2	
21	Forget, Don't Forgive!	December 14, 2015	#LNForgetDontForgive	23.3%	#1	#4	
22	Follow The Lolo	December 15, 2015	#LNFollowTheLolo	22.8%	#1	#3	
23	Sorry Po, Lolay!	December 16, 2015	#LNSorryPoLolay	23.4%	#1	#3	
24	PID's Can Work	December 17, 2015	#LNPIDsCanWork	23.1%	#1	#3	
25	Don Migz Defends Tinay	December 18, 2015	#LNDonMigzDefendsTinay	24.6%	#1	#1	
26	Desisyon ni Lolay	December 21, 2015	#LNDesisyonNiLolay	23.0%	#1	#3	
27	Sinong Tatay Mo?	December 22, 2015	#LNSinongTatayMo	22.8%	#1	#2	
28	Love Lang, No War	December 23, 2015	#LNLoveLangNoWar	22.4%	#1	#2	
29	Where Na U, Little Nanays?	December 24, 2015	#LNWhereNaULittleNanays	18.8%	#1	#2	
30	MaGMAhalan Tayo	December 25, 2015	#LNMaGMAhalanTayo	17.6%	#1	#3	
31	Kalma Lang, Helga!	December 28, 2015	#LNKalmaLangHelga	22.4%	#1	#2	
32	Stop The Hate	December 29, 2015	#LNStopTheHate	21.4%	#1	#3	
33	Sikretong Malupit	December 30, 2015	#LNSikretongMalupit	21.3%	#1	#1	
34	Friend Zoned	December 31, 2015	#LNFriendZoned	17.7%	#1	#3	

=== January 2016 ===
Episode		Original air date	Social Media Hashtag	AGB Nielsen Mega Manila Households in Television Homes			Ref.
Episode		Original air date	Social Media Hashtag	Rating	Timeslot Rank	Primetime Rank	Ref.
35	Kutob ni Don Migz	January 1, 2016	#LNKutobNiDonMigz	19.8%	#1	#2	
36	Lolay and Loloy, LQ	January 4, 2016	#LNLolayLoloyLQ	20.7%	#1	#3	
37	Anak ko 'Yan	January 5, 2016	#LNAnakKoYan	21.8%	#1	#2	
38	Sorry Po	January 6, 2016	#LNSorryPo	21.0%	#1	#3	
39	Asawa Vs. GF	January 7, 2016	#LNAsawaVsGF	21.2%	#1	#5	
40	2 Loloys and a Lolay	January 8, 2016	#LN2LoloysAndALolay	23.3%	#1	#4	
41	Royal Rambol	January 11, 2016	#LNRoyalRambol	22.9%	#1	#2	
42	Oragon Di Uurong	January 12, 2016	#LNOragonDiUurong	21.9%	#1	#2	
43	Mama Guy and Papa Boyet	January 13, 2016	#LNMamaGuyPapaBoyet	20.4%	#2	#3	
44	Uy, Selos si Loloy!	January 14, 2016	#LNUySelosSiLoloy	23.6%	#1	#2	
45	I am Sick	January 15, 2016	#LittleNanayIAmSick	22.4%	#1	#1	
46	Pray For ChieChie	January 18, 2016	#LNPrayForChieChie	21.2%	#2	#3	
47	Don't Tell a Lie	January 19, 2016	#LNDontTellALie	19.9%	#2	#3	
48	Bawal ang Sad	January 20, 2016	#LNBawalAngSad	21.2%	#2	#2	
49	Wag po Galit, Lolay!	January 21, 2016	#LNWagPoGalitLolay	23.3%	#2	#3	
50	Huling Family Yakap	January 22, 2016	#LNHulingFamilyYakap	19.6%	#2	#4	
51	Lolays Great Escape	January 25, 2016	#LNLolaysGreatEscape	22.0%	#2	#4	
52	Dapat Happy Lang	January 26, 2016	#LNDapatHappyLang	20.9%	#2	#5	
53	Yakapsule	January 27, 2016	#LNYakapsule	21.5%	#2	#2	
54	Shocking News	January 28, 2016	#LNShockingNews	22.7%	#2	#3	
55	Lost, Sana Ma-Found!	January 29, 2016	#LNLostSanaMaFound	20.0%	#2	#3	

=== February 2016 ===
Episode		Original air date	Social Media Hashtag	AGB Nielsen Mega Manila Households in Television Homes			Ref.
Episode		Original air date	Social Media Hashtag	Rating	Timeslot Rank	Primetime Rank	Ref.
56	So Happy Together	February 1, 2016	#LNSoHappyTogether	22.9%	#2	#3	
57	Sepanx	February 2, 2016	#LNSepanx	22.4%	#2	#4	
58	Major Reveal	February 3, 2016	#LNMajorReveal	19.2%	#2	#3	
59	Bagyong Parating	February 4, 2016	#LNBagyongParating	22.9%	#2	#4	
60	Basang-basa sa Ulan	February 5, 2016	#LNBasangBasaSaUlan	22.9%	#2	#3	
61	New Bahay, New Buhay	February 8, 2016	#LNNewBahayNewBuhay	23.1%	#2	#3	
62	Feeling New Nanay	February 9, 2016	#LNFeelingNewNanay	23.9%	#2	#3	
63	Prinsipyo Not For Sale	February 10, 2016	#LNPrinsipyoNotForSale	21.9%	#2	#3	
64	Send in the Clown	February 11, 2016	#LNSendInTheClown	23.7%	#2	#3	
65	Who You, Reggie?	February 12, 2016	#LNWhoYouReggie	22.0%	#2	#4	
66	Little Nanay's Reunited	February 15, 2016	#LittleNanaysReunited	20.9%	#2	#4	
67	Archie Vs. Reggie	February 16, 2016	#LNArchieVsReggie	24.0%	#2	#2	
68	Uy, Selos si Archie!	February 17, 2016	#LNUySelosSiArchie	22.3%	#2	#3	
69	Secret is Out	February 18, 2016	#LNSecretIsOut	22.2%	#2	#3	
70	Bawi o Laban?	February 19, 2016	#LNBawiOLaban	22.6%	#2	#2	
71	Pamilya Wars	February 22, 2016	#LNPamilyaWars	21.8%	#2	#3	
72	Takas Pa More	February 23, 2016	#LNTakasPaMore	21.8%	#2	#4	
73	Back To Homebase	February 24, 2016	#LNBackToHomebase	22.4%	#2	#3	
74	Don't Cry Tatay	February 25, 2016	#LNDontCryTatay	21.6%	#2	#4	
75	Kapit Lang	February 26, 2016	#LNKapitLang	20.7%	#2	#3	
76	Caught on Cam	February 29, 2016	#LNCaughtOnCam	21.5%	#2	#4	

=== March 2016 ===
Episode		Original air date	Social Media Hashtag	AGB Nielsen Mega Manila Households in Television Homes			Ref.
Episode		Original air date	Social Media Hashtag	Rating	Timeslot Rank	Primetime Rank	Ref.
77	May Naghimala	March 1, 2016	#LNMayNaghimala	21.7%	#2	#4	
78	Wag, BruHelga!	March 2, 2016	#LNWagBruHelga	19.6%	#2	#4	
79	Alam na This	March 3, 2016	#LNAlamNaThis	22.1%	#2	#4	
80	Knows na ni G-Pop	March 4, 2016	#LNKnowsNaNiGPop	23.9%	#2	#2	
81	The Truth Hurts	March 7, 2016	#LNTheTruthHurts	23.6%	#2	#2	
82	TLC for G-Pop	March 8, 2016	#LNTLCForGPop	22.7%	#2	#4	
83	Laban Kung Laban	March 9, 2016	#LNLabanKungLaban	21.7%	#2	#3	
84	One Team Tayo	March 10, 2016	#LNOneTeamTayo	22.9%	#2	#2	
85	All Together Now	March 11, 2016	#LNAllTogetherNow	22.6%	#2	#2	
86	Dapat Laging Strong	March 14, 2016	#LNDapatLagingStrong	25.4%	#1	#1	
87	Balik-bahay	March 15, 2016	#LNBalikBahay	24.4%	#1	#2	
88	Ceasefire	March 16, 2016	#LNCeasefire	22.8%	#2	#3	
89	Level-up na si Tinay	March 17, 2016	#LNLevelUpNaSiTinay	24.6%	#1	#1	
90	Little Nanay's Go Fight	March 18, 2016	#LittleNanaysGoFight	23.5%	#1	#1	
91	Love IT Like Nanays	March 21, 2016	#LNLoveITLikeNanays	23.8%	#1	#1	
92	Ngiting Little Nanays	March 22, 2016	#NgitingLittleNanays	24.2%	#1	#2	
93	Happy Lang, Bow!	March 23, 2016	#LittleNanayHappyLangBow	24.2%	#1	#1	
