= Little Nanay =

Philippine television drama series

- Title card
- Also known as: Little Mommy
- Genre: Drama
- Created by: Lobert "Obet" Villela
- Written by: Lobert "Obet" Villela; Onat Sales; Glaiza Ramirez
- Directed by: Ricky Davao
- Creative director: Roy Iglesias
- Starring: Kris Bernal; Chlaui Malayao
- Theme music composer: Ann Margaret Figueroa
- Opening theme: "Kasama Kita" by Chlaui Malayao and Kris Bernal
- Country of origin: Philippines
- Original language: Tagalog
- No. of episodes: 93 (list of episodes)

Production
- Executive producer: Darling Pulido-Torres
- Production locations: Manila, Philippines; Bocaue, Bulacan, Philippines
- Camera setup: Multiple-camera setup
- Running time: 24–41 minutes
- Production company: GMA Entertainment TV

Original release
- Network: GMA Network
- Release: November 16, 2015 – March 23, 2016

Little Nanay (transl. little mother / international title: Little Mommy) is a Philippine television drama series broadcast by GMA Network. Directed by Ricky Davao, it stars Kris Bernal and Chlaui Malayao in the title role. It premiered on November 16, 2015 on the network's Telebabad line up. The series concluded on March 23, 2016, with a total of 93 episodes.

The series is streaming online on YouTube.

== Premise ==
Miguel's daughter becomes estranged after living with Rey Batongbuhay to whom she conceived a daughter, Tinay who has a special condition. Despite the challenges brought about by her condition, she finds love and care through her grandparents, half-brothers and childhood friend Archie, who she develops an attachment which she mistakes for love. Tinay later gets impregnated by Archie leading to their marriage and raising their daughter Chiechie.

== Cast and characters ==
Cast

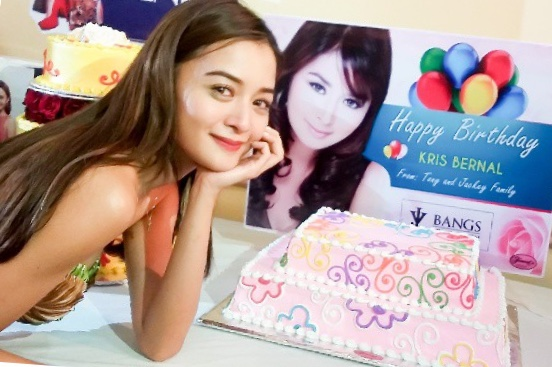
Kris Bernal

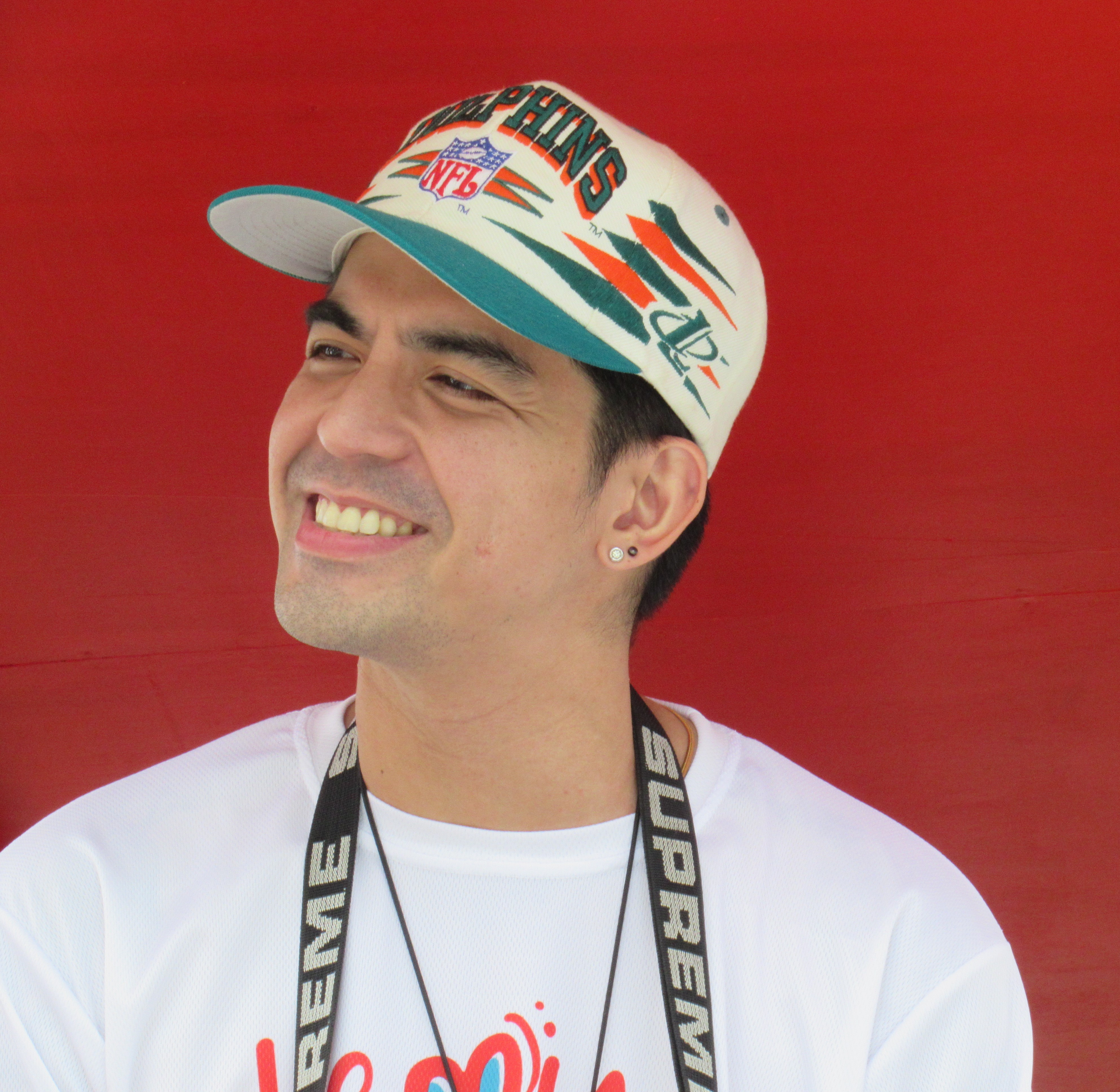
Mark Herras

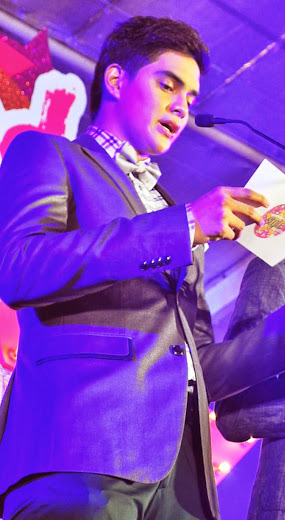
Juancho Triviño

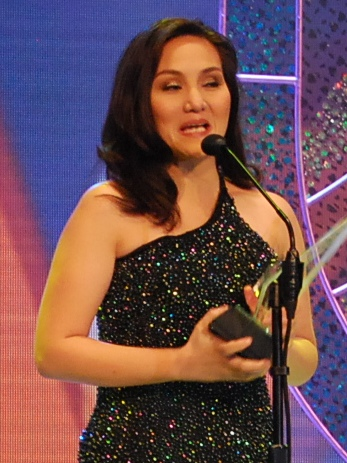
Gladys Reyes

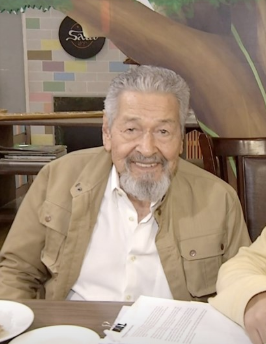
Eddie Garcia

Lead cast

- Kris Bernal as Celestina "Tinay" V. Batongbuhay-San Pedro
- Chlaui Malayao as Chiechie B. San Pedro

Supporting cast

- Nora Aunor as Annie Batongbuhay
- Bembol Roco as Berto Batongbuhay
- Mark Herras as Peter Parker Batongbuhay
- Juancho Triviño as Bruce Wayne Batongbuhay
- Keempee de Leon as Edgar San Pedro
- Gladys Reyes as Vivian San Pedro
- Hiro Peralta as Archie San Pedro
- Eddie Garcia as Miguel "Migz" Vallejo
- Sunshine Dizon as Helga Vallejo-Cubrador
- Renz Fernandez as Gerald Cruz
- Wynwyn Marquez as Beatrice

Recurring cast

- Paolo Contis as Stanley Cubrador
- Dexter Doria as Flor
- Rafa Siguion-Reyna as Botsok
- Faye Alhambra as Sophia V. Cubrador
- Jinri Park as Portia
- Christopher De Leon as August "Tisoy" D. Castañeda

Guest cast

- Jay Arcilla as Reggie Vallejo-Cubrador
- Stephanie Sol as Toni Batongbuhay
- Rich Asuncion as Janet
- Denise Barbacena as Trixie
- Abel Estanislao as Carlo
- Maey Bautista as Rubia
- Meryll Soriano as Judith Fajardo
- Lou Veloso as Kapitan
- Kitsi Pagaspas as Maria
- Sherilyn Reyes as Belen
- Abril Tomas as Leonora
- Leonora Cano as Elsa
- Meann Espinosa as Teresa
- Cesar Batistis as Pugok
- Julienn Mendoza as Kwekwek
- Kenneth Paul as Benjie
- Pauline Mendoza as Macy
- Pam Prinster as Jelsa
- Judie dela Cruz as Jenny Cubrador
- Tiffany Yamut as Chiechie's classmate
- Gwen Zamora as Lorna Vallejo-Batongbuhay
- Max Collins as a TV actress
- Ian De Leon as Reynaldo Batongbuhay
- Janine Gutierrez as Carmela Villon-Batongbuhay
- Dianne Medina as Cindy Cruz
- Alessandra de Rossi as Eunice
- Will Ashley de Leon as younger Peter
- Zymic Jaranilla as younger Bruce
- Sachi Manahan as younger Tinay
- Carol Pelicano as a vegetable vendor

== Production ==
Principal photography commenced in October 2015. Filming concluded in March 2016.

== Ratings ==
According to AGB Nielsen Philippines' Mega Manila household television ratings, the pilot episode of Little Nanay earned a 22.7% rating. The final episode scored a 24.2% rating.

== Accolades ==
Accolades received by Little Nanay
Year	Award	Category	Recipient	Result	Ref.
2016	30th PMPC Star Awards for Television	Best Drama Supporting Actress	Sunshine Dizon	Won	
