= Prinsesa ng Buhay Ko =

Philippine television drama series

- Title card
- Also known as: My Girl
- Genre: Drama; Romantic comedy
- Developed by: Denoy Navarro-Punio
- Written by: John Kenneth de Leon; Tina Samson-Velasco; Liberty Trinidad
- Directed by: Dondon Santos
- Creative director: Jun Lana
- Starring: Kris Bernal; Aljur Abrenica
- Theme music composer: Janno Gibbs
- Opening theme: "Ikaw Lang at Ako" by Aljur Abrenica
- Country of origin: Philippines
- Original language: Tagalog
- No. of episodes: 90

Production
- Executive producer: Leilani Feliciano–Sandoval
- Production locations: Quezon City, Philippines
- Camera setup: Multiple-camera setup
- Running time: 30–45 minutes
- Production company: GMA Entertainment TV

Original release
- Network: GMA Network
- Release: September 23, 2013 – January 24, 2014

Prinsesa ng Buhay Ko (transl. princess of my life / international title: My Girl) is a Philippine television drama romantic comedy series broadcast by GMA Network. Directed by Dondon Santos, it stars Kris Bernal and Aljur Abrenica. It premiered on September 23, 2013 on the network's Telebabad line up. The series concluded on January 24, 2014, with a total of 90 episodes.

== Cast and characters ==
Cast

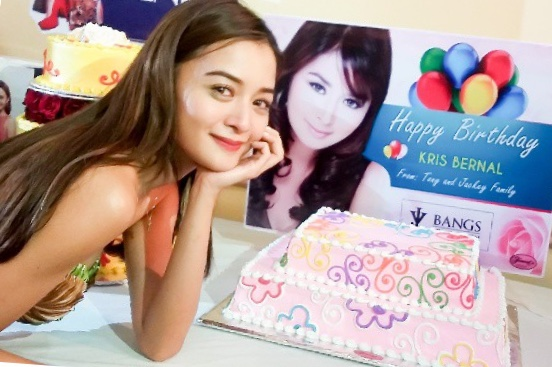
Kris Bernal

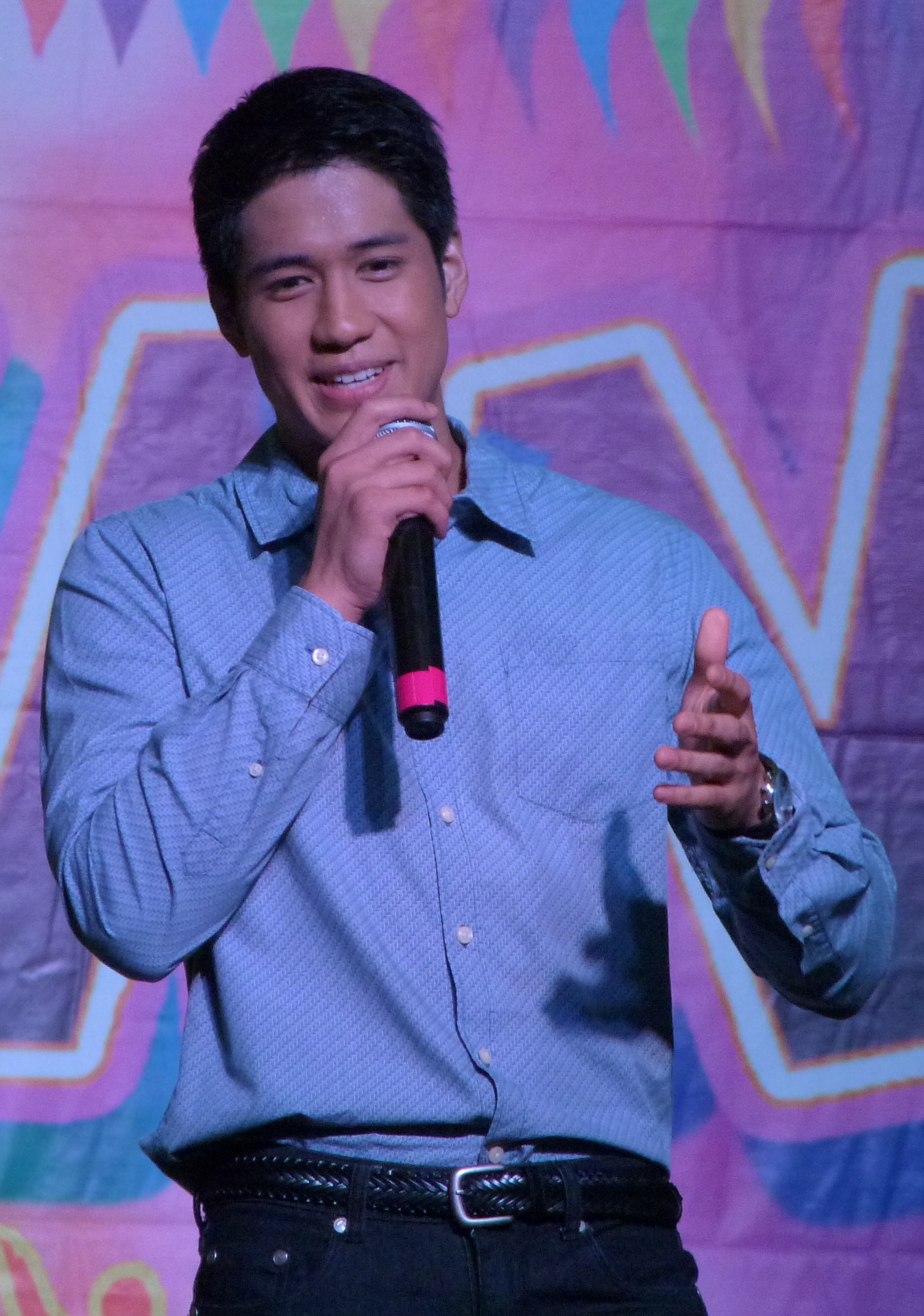
Aljur Abrenica

Lead cast

- Kris Bernal as Princess "Cess" Inocencio-Grande
- Aljur Abrenica as Niccolo "Nick" Grande

Supporting cast

- Renz Fernandez as Louise Grande
- LJ Reyes as Kate Napoleon
- Carmi Martin as Eliza Montes-Grande
- Maritoni Fernandez as Tess de Leon
- Susan Africa as Alicia Salazar
- Ping Medina as Steve Amador
- Marco Alcaraz as Waldo Salazar
- Lian Paz as Violet Salazar
- Vincent Magbanua as Vicvic

Guest cast

- Ryza Cenon as Selena Monteverde
- John Feir as Johnny Napoleon
- Julie Lee as Trina Zaragosa
- Mark Anthony Fernandez as Benedict Bautista

== Production ==
Principal photography commenced in August 2013. Filming concluded in January 2014.

== Ratings ==
According to AGB Nielsen Philippines' Mega Manila household television ratings, the pilot episode of Prinsesa ng Buhay Ko earned an 18.2% rating. The final episode scored a 14.9% rating.
