= List of Tadhana episodes =

Tadhana is a weekly drama anthology series broadcast by GMA Network which aired every Saturday. Tadhana features the life experiences of Overseas Filipino Workers (OFWs) and the risks they're taking abroad just to give their family a comfortable and convenient life. The show is hosted by Marian Rivera.

== Series overview ==
| Year | Episodes | Originally released | |
| Year | Episodes | First released | Last released |
|---|---|---|---|
| 2017 | 33 | May 20, 2017 | December 30, 2017 |
| 2018 | 50 | January 6, 2018 | December 29, 2018 |
| 2019 | 50 | January 5, 2019 | December 21, 2019 |
| 2020 | 21 | January 11, 2020 | December 26, 2020 |
| 2021 | 45 | January 9, 2021 | December 25, 2021 |
| 2022 | 50 | January 1, 2022 | December 24, 2022 |
| 2023 | 48 | January 14, 2023 | December 23, 2023 |
| 2024 | 47 | January 6, 2024 | December 28, 2024 |
| 2025 | 49 | January 4, 2025 | December 27, 2025 |
| 2026 | TBA | January 3, 2026 | TBA |

== Episodes ==
=== 2017 ===
| No. | Title | Main cast | Directed by | Written by | Original release date |
|---|---|---|---|---|---|
| 1 | "Bilanggo"; Saudi Arabia | Kris Bernal | King Mark Baco | Jon Verzosa | May 20, 2017 |
Supporting Cast: Cherie Gil, Ces Quesada, Lucho Ayala, Dess Verzosa, Ala Hegazy, Yassine Ouahlim
| 2 | "Millionaire Maid"; Italy | Mikee Quintos | Michael Christian Cardoz | Michael Christian Cardoz | May 27, 2017 |
Supporting Cast: Teresa Loyzaga, Gui Adorno, Ruben Soriquez, Archi Adamos, Tanya Gomez, Star Orliza, Sue Prado
| 3 | "Pinay For Sale"; Malaysia | Meg Imperial | King Mark Baco | Troy Espiritu | June 3, 2017 |
Supporting Cast: Pen Medina, Jerald Napoles, Isabella de Leon, Ronnie "Atak" Araña
| 4 | "Dream House"; Hong Kong | Rochelle Pangilinan | Michael Christian Cardoz | Jerome Zamora | June 10, 2017 |
Supporting Cast: Luis Alandy, Miggs Cuaderno, Arny Ross, Mosang, Rebecca Chuaunsu, Leanne Bautista
| 5 | "Biyahero"; South Korea | Yasmien Kurdi | King Mark Baco | N/A | June 17, 2017 |
Supporting Cast: Biboy Ramirez, Glenda Garcia, Caprice Cayetano, Jang Hansik
| 6 | "My Love from Thailand"; Thailand | Empress Schuck | King Mark Baco | N/A | June 24, 2017 |
Supporting Cast: Jonathan Wanger, Tetay, Eric Buzbee, Tina Monasterio
| 7 | "Aishiteiru (Mahal Kita)"; Japan | Diva Montelaba | King Mark Baco | N/A | July 1, 2017 |
Supporting Cast: Neil Ryan Sese, Lovely Rivero, Nicki B, Art Acuña
| 8 | "Caregiver"; United Kingdom | Valerie Concepcion | Michael Christian Cardoz | N/A | July 8, 2017 |
Supporting Cast: Micko Laurente, Rafa Siguion-Reyna, Don Gordon Bell, Sunshine Teodoro, Eliza Sarmienta, Noel Trinidad
| 9 | "143 NZ"; New Zealand | Alex Medina; Max Collins | King Mark Baco | Troy Espiritu | July 15, 2017 |
Supporting Cast: Yayo Aguila, Barbara Miguel, Natileigh Sitoy, Jeff Smith, Anita Haines
| 10 | "Bagahe"; Hong Kong | Tina Paner | Rember Gelera | Jerome Zamora | July 22, 2017 |
Supporting Cast: Robert Ortega, John Manalo, Dang Cruz
| 11 | "Ang Batang Refugee"; Syria | Diana Zubiri | King Mark Baco | Jon Verzosa | July 29, 2017 |
Supporting Cast: Leandro Baldemor, Dexter Doria, RJ Agustin, Rhelgie Columna
| 12 | "'Third Wife"; Brunei | Katrina Halili | Michael Christian Cardoz | Michael Christian Cardoz | August 5, 2017 |
Supporting Cast: Emilio Garcia, Samantha Lopez, Yanna Laurel, Martha Comia
| 13 | "Ang Lihim ni Paolo"; Saudi Arabia | Edgar Allan Guzman | King Mark Baco | N/A | August 12, 2017 |
Supporting Cast: Jade Lopez, Richard Quan, Vivo Ouano, Vangie Labalan, Roan Ruiz
| 14 | "Chef Tisoy"; Italy | Gabby Eigenmann | Rember Gelera | Jerome Zamora | August 19, 2017 |
Supporting Cast: Deborah Sun, CJ Ramos, Mia Pangyarihan, Alex Anselmuccio, Chris Perris
| 15 | "Ang American Dream ni Ma'am"; Maryland, USA | Lovi Poe | King Mark Baco | Troy Espiritu | August 26, 2017 |
Supporting Cast: Migo Adecer, Tess Bomb, Mailes Kanapi, Eva Darren, Crispin Pineda
| 16 | "Yaya Abogada"; Spain | LJ Reyes | JP Habac | James Harvey Estrada | September 2, 2017 |
Supporting Cast: Jackie Lou Blanco, Bon Vibar, Lance Serrano, Gigi Locsin
| 17 | "Saudi Beauty Queen"; Saudi Arabia | Martin Escudero | King Mark Baco | Jon Verzosa | September 9, 2017 |
Supporting Cast: Melissa Mendez, Kiko Matos, Yasser Marta, Mara Alberto, Pepita Curtis, Dentrix Ponce
| 18 | "Hagod"; Kuwait | Mara Lopez | Unknown | Jerome Zamora | September 16, 2017 |
Supporting Cast: Anne Garcia, Elle Ramirez, Ervic Vijandre, Isabel Granada Note: This is Isabel Granada's final appearance almost 2 months before her death in Qatar on November 4, 2017.
| 19 | "Exit Point"; Dubai, Abu Dhabi, Iran | Ina Feleo; Geoff Eigenmann | King Mark Baco | N/A | September 23, 2017 |
Supporting Cast: Maey Bautista, Catherine Rem
| 20 | "Love, Israel"; Israel | Lauren Young; Matt Evans | James Harvey Beltran | Rember Gelera | September 30, 2017 |
Supporting Cast: Mickey Ferriols, Shyr Valdez, Rolando Inocencio
| 21 | "Hulog ng Langit"; France | Karel Marquez; Mike Tan | King Mark Baco | Rae Red | October 7, 2017 |
Supporting Cast: Cai Cortez, Irene Celebre, Richard Manabat, Yvonne Salcedo
| 22 | "Beauty and Bahrain"; Bahrain | Barbie Forteza | Michael Cardoz | Michael Cardoz | October 14, 2017 |
Supporting Cast: Cedric Juan, Ian Batherson, Mico Aytona, Archie Adamos, Allysa de Real
| 23 | "Lapnos"; Malaysia | Glaiza de Castro | King Mark Baco | N/A | October 21, 2017 |
Supporting Cast: Marina Benipayo, William Lorenzo, Tanya Gomez, Bimbo Bautista, Norma Wang
| 24 | "Sundo"; Taiwan | Hero Angeles | Rember Gelera | Jerome Zamora | October 28, 2017 |
Supporting Cast: Dennis Padilla, Yayo Aguila, Kenneth Medrano, BJ Forbes, Michael Gonzales
| 25 | "Lihim"; Russia | Snooky Serna | King Mark Baco | Jerome Zamora | November 4, 2017 |
Supporting Cast: Mon Confiado, Denise Barbacena, Franchesca Salcedo
| 26 | "Huling Hiling"; Singapore | Gina Alajar | Michael Christian Cardoz | Michael Christian Cardoz | November 11, 2017 |
Supporting Cast: Anna Luna, Jess Mendoza, Kate Valdez, Mayen Estanero, Debraliz
| 27 | "Love Rehab"; New York City, USA | Jason Francisco | King Mark Baco | Jon Verzosa | November 18, 2017 |
Supporting Cast: Lovely Abella, Matthias Rhoads, Lou Veloso, Brian O'Lee, Lauren Reid
| 28 | "Broken Vow"; Qatar | Lotlot de Leon | King Mark Baco | Jon Verzosa | November 25, 2017 |
Supporting Cast: Allan Paule, Jaycee Parker
| 29 | "Status, It's Complicated"; Australia | Assunta de Rossi | King Mark Baco | Troy Espiritu | December 2, 2017 |
Supporting Cast: Cheche Tolentino, Bodjie Pascua, Carme Sanchez, Ian Ross
| 30 | "Pamana"; Bahamas | Gardo Versoza | Michael Christian Cardoz | James Harvey Estrada | December 9, 2017 |
Supporting Cast: Maria Isabel Lopez, Jak Roberto, Paul Holmes, Therese Malvar
| 31 | "Pag-uwi"; Ontario, Canada | Angelu de Leon; Bobby Andrews | King Mark Baco | Jerome Zamora | December 16, 2017 |
Supporting Cast: Marc Justine Alvarez, John Kenneth Giducos
| 32 | "Prodigal Daughter"; Hong Kong | Sanya Lopez | King Mark Baco | Jerome Zamora | December 23, 2017 |
Supporting Cast: Elizabeth Oropesa, Soliman Cruz, Divine, Nikki Co, Keann Johnson
| 33 | "'Third Wife"; Brunei | Katrina Halili | Michael Christian Cardoz | Michael Christian Cardoz | December 30, 2017 |
Supporting Cast: Emilio Garcia, Samantha Lopez, Yanna Laurel, Martha Comia Note: Replay story on August 5, 2017

=== 2018 ===
| No. | Title | Main cast | Directed by | Written by | Original release date |
|---|---|---|---|---|---|
| 34 | "Nanny Knows Best"; United Arab Emirates | Gladys Reyes | King Mark Baco | Troy Espiritu | January 6, 2018 |
Supporting Cast: Odette Khan, Bruce Roeland, Janna Dominguez, Kelvin Miranda, Dave Bornea
| 35 | "Karayom"; Taiwan | Sheena Halili; Richard Juan | Rember Gelera | Michael Christian Cardoz | January 13, 2018 |
Supporting Cast: Irma Adlawan, Nicki Balaj, Nancy Gan
| 36 | "Ate"; United Kingdom | Bianca Umali | King Mark Baco | James Harvey Estrada | January 20, 2018 |
Supporting Cast: Chynna Ortaleza
| 37 | "Sayaw sa Macau"; Macau | Rodjun Cruz | Rember Gelera | Jerome Zamora | January 27, 2018 |
Supporting Cast: Dianne Medina, Tetchie Agbayani, Kaiser Boado
| 38 | "Pangarap na Pag-Yemen"; Yemen | Archie Alemania | King Mark Baco | James Harvey Estrada | February 3, 2018 |
Supporting Cast: Mickey Ferriols, Pekto, Lou Veloso
| 39 | "Ola Kala"; Greece | Barbie Forteza; Derrick Monasterio | Rember Gelera | Troy Espiritu | February 10, 2018 |
Supporting Cast: Chlaui Malayao, Marc Justine Alvarez, Princess Guevarra
| 40 | "Magkasalo"; Italy | Ara Mina | Rember Gelera | Michael Christian Cardoz | February 17, 2018 |
Supporting Cast: Marc Abaya, Diva Montelaba, Ayeesha Cervantes, Rowena Concepcion, Alberto Bruno
| 41 | "Lihim at Liham"; Saudi Arabia | Glydel Mercado | King Mark Baco | Jerome Zamora | February 24, 2018 |
Supporting Cast: Inah de Belen, Geleen Eugenio, Che Ramos; Inspired by a Wattpad short story "Memories of Jeddah" written by Primrose Dianne (credited as "Pasasalamat")
| 42 | "Jackpot"; France | Valeen Montenegro | King Mark Baco | Jerome Zamora | March 3, 2018 |
Supporting Cast: Hannah Precilas, Jonathan Wayner, Gwendolyn Ruais
| 43 | "Battered Wife"; United Arab Emirates | Aubrey Miles | Michael Christian Cardoz | Troy Espiritu | March 10, 2018 |
Supporting Cast: James Blanco, Zymic Jaranilla, Constantin Lehmann-Bärenklau, Teresa Adebahr
| 44 | "Ang Disgrasyada"; Saudi Arabia, Australia | Angel Aquino | King Mark Baco | Rae Red | March 17, 2018 |
Supporting Cast: Michael Flores, Dexter Doria, Sue Prado, Al Gatmaitan, Adrian Pascual
| 45 | "Naulilang Ina"; Jordan | Sunshine Dizon | Rember Gelera | Nathan Arciaga | March 24, 2018 |
Supporting Cast: Jordan Herrera, Soliman Cruz, Paolo Gumabao, Mariella Castillo, Bruce Roeland, Carly Feliciano, VJ Parreno, Tess Gonzales
| 46 | "Luho"; Oman | Mark Herras | King Mark Baco | Jerome Zamora | April 7, 2018 |
Supporting Cast: Dionne Monsanto, Marco Alcaraz, Jade Lopez, Leanne Bautista
| 47 | "Secret Affair"; Singapore | Carlos Agassi | Michael Christian Cardoz | James Harvey Estrada | April 14, 2018 |
Supporting Cast: Rich Asuncion, Paolo Paraiso, TJ dela Paz, Yuan Francisco, Afi Africa
| 48 | "Pilit na Pag-ibig"; United Arab Emirates | Rochelle Pangilinan | King Mark Baco | Jerome Zamora | April 21, 2018 |
Supporting Cast: Eric Fructuoso, Lara Morena
| 49 | "My Korean Fairy Tale"; South Korea | Kim Domingo; Yohan Hwang | Rember Gelera | Nathaniel Arciaga | April 28, 2018 |
Supporting Cast: Madeleine Nicolas, Jinri Park, Dasuri Choi, Sunshine Teodoro, Rino Marco, Prince Clemente, Jacob Briz
| 50 | "Masahol Pa sa Hayop"; Singapore | Gelli de Belen | King Mark Baco | Troy Espiritu | May 5, 2018 |
Supporting Cast: Allan Paule, Deborah Sun, Vincent Magbanua, Kyle Ocampo
| 51 | "Huli Cam"; Hong Kong | Elle Ramirez | King Mark Baco | James Harvey Estrada | May 12, 2018 |
Supporting Cast: Richard Quan, Lovely Rivero, Lenlen Frial, Baninay Bautista
| 52 | "Hinog sa Pilit"; Syria | Pauline Mendoza | Michael Christian Cardoz | Michael Christian Cardoz | May 19, 2018 |
Supporting Cast: Franchesca Salcedo, Andrea del Rosario, Alma Concepcion
| 53 | "Torture"; United Arab Emirates | Angelika dela Cruz | Rember Gelera | Troy Espiritu | May 26, 2018 |
Supporting Cast: Sharmaine Arnaiz, Biboy Ramirez, Lucho Ayala, Shermaine Santiago
| 54 | "Kamao"; Hong Kong | Rocco Nacino | Rember Gelera | James Harvey Estrada | June 2, 2018 |
Supporting Cast: Roi Vinzon, Kevin Santos, Froilan Sales, Mayton Eugenio
| 55 | "Dukot"; Saudi Arabia | Vaness del Moral | Michael Christian Cardoz | Michael Christian Cardoz | June 9, 2018 |
Supporting Cast: Maricar de Mesa, Dominic Roco
| 56 | "Sa Mga Mata ni Itay"; Netherlands | Bembol Roco | King Mark Baco | Troy Espiritu | June 16, 2018 |
Supporting Cast: Mikoy Morales, Klea Pineda, Jhoana Marie Tan, Lui Manansala
| 57 | "Sugat ni Inay"; Bahrain | Marian Rivera | Dingdong Dantes | Nathaniel Arciaga; Jerome Zamora | June 23, 2018 |
Anniversary Special; Supporting Cast: Jackie Lou Blanco, Lotlot de Leon, Emilio Garcia, Beverly Salviejo, Anthony Falcon, Zymic Jaranilla, Dindo Arroyo
| 58 | "The Revenge"; Dubai, United Arab Emirates | Eula Valdez | King Mark Baco | Carlo Obispo | June 30, 2018 |
Supporting Cast: Lee O' Brian, Angelina Kanapi, Gino Ilustre, Cecilia Santos
| 59 | "Linlang"; Egypt | Diana Zubiri | Michael Christian Cardoz | James Harvey Estrada | July 7, 2018 |
Supporting Cast: Francine Prieto, Angeli Bayani, Paolo Paraiso, Mark Dionisio
| 60 | "Saranghae"; South Korea | Sheryl Cruz | King Mark Baco | Troy Espiritu | July 14, 2018 (replay on December 29, 2018) |
Supporting Cast: Shyr Valdez, Aira Bermudez, Alex Chang
| 61 | "Tukso"; Hong Kong | Camille Prats | Zig Dulay | Michael Christian Cardoz | July 21, 2018 |
Supporting Cast: Alex Medina, Manuel Chua, Eunice Lagusad
| 62 | "Baby Maker"; Saudi Arabia | Valerie Concepcion | King Mark Baco | Jerome Zamora | July 28, 2018 |
Supporting Cast: Phoemela Baranda, Michael Agassi, Marithez Samson, Angelica Ulip, Dyosa Pockoh
| 63 | "Hero Yayas"; Taiwan | Teresita Marquez; Ana Capri | Michael Christian Cardoz | Michael Christian Cardoz | August 4, 2018 |
Supporting Cast: Leanne Bautista, Seth dela Cruz, Kelvin Miranda
| 64 | "Stepdaughter"; Italy | Kris Bernal | King Mark Baco | Mario Banzon | August 11, 2018 |
Supporting Cast: Maria Isabel Lopez, DJ Durano, Nico Locco, Hannah Precillas, Franz de Martino
| 65 | "Ang Iniwan"; Spain | Jason Abalos; Valeen Montenegro | Zig Dulay | Troy Espiritu | August 18, 2018 |
Supporting Cast: Dianne Medina, Tanya Gomez, Regine Tolentino
| 66 | "Panganay"; United Arab Emirates | Amy Austria | King Mark Baco | Jerome Zamora | August 25, 2018 |
Supporting Cast: Kiko Estrada, Dexter Doria
| 67 | "Little Tatay"; Qatar | Allan "Mura" Padua | Michael Christian Cardoz | James Harvey Estrada | September 1, 2018 |
Supporting Cast: Franchesca Salcedo, Sheree Bautista, Martin Apolinar, Alvin Magnahoy
| 68 | "Dalawang Ina"; United Kingdom | Matet de Leon | Rember Gelera | Jessie Villabrille | September 8, 2018 |
Supporting Cast: Mona Louise Rey, Max Eigenmann, Kyle Ocampo, Sheila Marie Rodriguez
| 69 | "Ang Mabuting Anak"; Saudi Arabia | Kylie Padilla | King Mark Baco | Mario Banzon | September 15, 2018 |
Supporting Cast: Isay Alvarez, Yul Servo, Pinky Amador, Angela Evangelista
| 70 | "Lunok"; Macau | Gwen Zamora | Nick Olanka | Troy Espiritu | September 22, 2018 |
Supporting Cast: Angeli Bayani, Glenda Garcia, Rob Moya, Rolly Inocencio
| 71 | "Escort si Itay"; Thailand | Edgar Allan Guzman | King Mark Baco | Michael Christian Cardoz | September 29, 2018 |
Supporting Cast: Denise Barbacena, Samantha Lopez, Seth dela Cruz, Raquel Monteza, Justin Dimandal
| 72 | "Online Scandal"; Qatar | Cai Cortez | King Mark Baco | Nathaniel Arciaga | October 6, 2018 |
Supporting Cast: Joseph Bitangcol, Rey PJ Abellana, Mia Pangyarihan, Divine, Karlo Duterte
| 73 | "Tunay na Ina"; Dubai, United Arab Emirates | Angelu de Leon | Michael Christian Cardoz | Nathaniel Arciaga | October 13, 2018 |
Supporting Cast: Mel Martinez, Erlinda Villalobos, Mike Liwag
| 74 | "Pinalayas si Inay"; Hong Kong | Tetchie Agbayani | Michael Christian Cardoz | James Harvey Estrada | October 20, 2018 |
Supporting Cast: Elora Españo, Isabelle de Leon, Kiko Matos, Mel Kimura, Althea Ablan
| 75 | "Kumare"; Japan | Katrina Halili | Rember Gelera | Michael Christian Cardoz | October 27, 2018 |
Supporting Cast: Ahron Villena, Diva Montelaba, Odette Khan
| 76 | "Pinagsabay"; Bahamas | Sunshine Dizon | King Mark Baco | Mario Banzon | November 3, 2018 |
Supporting Cast: Lauren Young, Marco Alcaraz, Debraliz
| 77 | "Sukdulan"; Saudi Arabia | Yasmien Kurdi | King Mark Baco | Troy Espiritu | November 10, 2018 |
Supporting Cast: Carlos Agassi, Paolo Paraiso, Joseph Ison, Shermaine Santiago, Mariella Castillo
| 78 | "DH for Sale"; Jordan | Manilyn Reynes | Rember Gelera | Michael Christian Cardoz | November 17, 2018 |
Supporting Cast: Krystal Reyes, Phytos Ramirez, Sue Prado, Star Orjaliza
| 79 | "Babae Ako"; Italy | Mikoy Morales | King Mark Baco | James Harvey Estrada | November 24, 2018 |
Supporting Cast: Fabio Ide, Arianne Bautista, Patani Daño, Archi Adamos
| 80 | "Kidnap"; Malaysia | Kean Cipriano; Chynna Ortaleza | Michael Christian Cardoz | Michael Christian Cardoz | December 1, 2018 |
Supporting Cast: Mae Paner, Gigi Locsin, Caprice Cayetano, Raphael Landicho
| 81 | "Kural"; United Arab Emirates | Bianca Umali | King Mark Baco | Jerome Zamora | December 8, 2018 |
Supporting Cast: Mike Agassi, Jet Rai, Tanya Gomez, Richard Manabat, Micko Laurente, Rubi Rubi
| 82 | "Hostage"; Qatar | Gladys Reyes | Rember Gelera | Troy Espiritu | December 15, 2018 |
Supporting Cast: Kier Legaspi, Carmen Soriano, John Vincent Servilla
| 83 | "Pag-uwi"; United Kingdom | Tina Paner | King Mark Baco | Nathaniel Arciaga | December 22, 2018 |
Supporting Cast: Ashley Ortega, Jhoana Marie Tan, Martin del Rosario, Paul Salas, James Teng, Anne Garcia

=== 2019 ===
| No. | Title | Main cast | Directed by | Written by | Original release date |
|---|---|---|---|---|---|
| 84 | "Inabandona"; Canada | Meg Imperial | Michael Christian Cardoz | Troy Espiritu | January 5, 2019 |
Supporting Cast: Ina Feleo, Melissa Mendez, Lee O' Brian, Renzo Matunog
| 85 | "Lundag"; Kuwait | Jean Garcia | Rember Gelera | Jerome Zamora | January 12, 2019 |
Supporting Cast: Tetchie Agbayani, Erlinda Villalobos, Al Gaitmatan, Giovanni Baldisseri, Faith da Silva, Seth dela Cruz
| 86 | "Amain"; Singapore | Snooky Serna | Rember Gelera | Troy Espiritu | January 19, 2019 (replay on January 4, 2020) |
Supporting Cast: Archie Alemania, Isabelle de Leon, Marc Justine Alvarez, Mayen Estanero
| 87 | "Titser Yaya"; Saudi Arabia | Sanya Lopez | King Mark Baco | James Harvey Estrada | January 26, 2019 |
Supporting Cast: Sharmaine Suarez, Ian Batherson, Rob Moya
| 88 | "Gelato"; Italy | Rodjun Cruz | Michael Christian Cardoz | Michael Christian Cardoz | February 2, 2019 (replay on December 28, 2019) |
Supporting Cast: Dionne Monsanto, Jess Mendoza, Seth dela Cruz, Deborah Sun
| 89 | "Patibong"; Philippines | Phoebe Walker | King Mark Baco | Nathaniel Arciaga | February 9, 2019 |
Supporting Cast: Irma Adlawan, Rolly Inocencio, Alyssa Del Real, Mia Pangyarihan
| 90 | "Seoulmates"; South Korea | Sophie Albert; Jason Abalos | Rember Gelera | Troy Espiritu | February 16, 2019 (replay on April 4, 2020) |
Supporting Cast: Archie Adamos, Cathy Rem, Arianne Bautista
| 91 | "Tatlong Panganay"; Taiwan | Diana Zubiri | King Mark Baco | James Harvey Estrada | February 23, 2019 |
Supporting Cast: Jao Mapa, Jana Victoria, Jason Francisco, Leanne Bautista
| 92 | "Insan"; Japan | Bing Loyzaga | Michael Christian Cardoz | Troy Espiritu | March 2, 2019 |
Supporting Cast: Antonio Aquitania, Ping Medina, Micko Laurente
| 93 | "Sako"; United Kingdom | Inah de Belen | King Mark Baco | Conan Altatis | March 9, 2019 |
Supporting Cast: Al Tantay, Suzette Ranillo, Patricia Tumulak
| 94 | "Bangkay"; Pakistan | Manilyn Reynes; Gladys Reyes | Rember Gelera | James Harvey Estrada | March 16, 2019 |
Supporting Cast: Pauline Mendoza, Miggs Cuaderno, Mike Lloren
| 95 | "Sapi"; Illinois, USA | Jennica Garcia; Empress Schuck | King Mark Baco | Carlo Obispo | March 23, 2019 |
Supporting Cast: Ryan Eigenmann, Phytos Ramirez, Lovely Rivero Note: This is the first episode hosted by Dingdong Dantes.
| 96 | "Patay na Buhay"; Saipan | Maureen Larrazabal; Epy Quizon | King Mark Baco | Michael Christian Cardoz | March 30, 2019 |
Supporting Cast: Ayeesha Cervantes, Anthony Falcon, Kelvin Miranda
| 97 | "Boso"; United Arab Emirates | Sanya Lopez | Nick Olanka | Jessie Villabrille | April 6, 2019 |
Supporting Cast: Dominic Roco, Liezel Lopez
| 98 | "Sangla"; Hong Kong | Katrina Halili | Michael Christian Cardoz | Troy Espiritu | April 13, 2019 (replay on March 28, 2020) |
Supporting Cast: Gigi Locsin, Rein Adriano, Shermaine Santiago
| 99 | "Chop-chop"; United Arab Emirates | Sunshine Dizon | King Mark Baco | James Harvey Estrada | April 27, 2019 |
Supporting Cast: Sue Prado, Neil Ryan Sese
| 100 | "Dalagang Pilipina"; Saudi Arabia | Divine Aucina | King Mark Baco | Jessie Villabrille | May 4, 2019 |
Supporting Cast: Jeric Gonzales, Yayo Aguila, Sharmaine Arnaiz, Rein Adriano
| 101 | "Marital Rape"; California, USA | Kris Bernal | Rember Gelera | Jessie Villabrille | May 11, 2019 |
Supporting Cast: Polo Ravales, Eman Juan, Bruce Roeland, Matthew Sedrek Maggs
| 102 | "Lindol"; Taiwan | Diva Montelaba | Michael Christian Cardoz | Troy Espiritu | May 18, 2019 |
Supporting Cast: Dexter Doria, Tanya Gomez, Joel Saracho, Karl Medina, Faith da Silva, Angelica Ulip
| 103 | "K-Pop"; South Korea | Rita de Guzman | Rember Gelera | James Harvey Estrada | May 25, 2019 |
Supporting Cast: Marlann Flores, Teresa Loyzaga, Angeli Bayani, Shine Kuk, Omar Flores
| 104 | "Libya"; Libya | Alessandra De Rossi | Rember Gelera | Michael Christian Cardoz | June 1, 2019 |
Supporting Cast: Elle Ramirez, Lucho Ayala, Mel Kimura, Brent Valdez
| 105 | "Menor de Edad"; Saudi Arabia | Kyline Alcantara | Michael Christian Cardoz | Jessie Villabrille | June 8, 2019 |
Supporting Cast: Sharmaine Suarez, Robert Ortega, Anne Garcia, Chlaui Malayao, John Kenneth Giducos, Caprice Cayetano, Euwenn Aleta
| 106 | "Tatay Eddie"; Spain | Martin del Rosario | King Mark Baco | Troy Espiritu | June 15, 2019 |
Supporting Cast: Bembol Roco, Vaness del Moral, Lovely Rivero, Angelica Ulip, Dave Bornea
| 107 | "Real Beauty"; South Korea | Rhian Ramos | King Mark Baco | James Harvey Estrada | June 22, 2019 |
Supporting Cast: Dion Ignacio, Arianne Bautista, Ali Khatibi, Cherrie Madrigal
| 108 | "Bayani sa Macau"; Macau | Ken Chan | Rember Gelera | Jessie Villabrille | June 29, 2019 |
Supporting Cast: Isabelle de Leon, Glenda Garcia, Soliman Cruz, Gino Ilustre
| 109 | "DH Beauty Queen"; Hong Kong | Assunta de Rossi | Rember Gelera | James Harvey Estrada | July 6, 2019 |
Supporting Cast: Epy Quizon, Michael Flores
| 110 | "Akin ang Anak Ko (Part 1)"; Kuwait | Katrina Halili | Michael Christian Cardoz | Troy Espiritu | July 13, 2019 |
Supporting Cast: Dina Bonnevie, Lloyd Samartino, Neil Ryan Sese, Jade Lopez Note: This is the first episode with 2-part episode.
| 111 | "Akin ang Anak Ko (Part 2)"; Kuwait | Katrina Halili | Michael Christian Cardoz | Troy Espiritu | July 20, 2019 |
Supporting Cast: Dina Bonnevie, Lloyd Samartino, Jade Lopez Note: From this episode, Marian Rivera returned on the show.
| 112 | "Obsession (Part 1)"; Singapore | Thea Tolentino; Mikee Quintos | King Mark Baco | Jessie Villabrille | July 27, 2019 |
Supporting Cast: David Licauco, Kim Last, Pinky Amador
| 113 | "Obsession (Part 2)"; Singapore | Thea Tolentino; Mikee Quintos | King Mark Baco | Jessie Villabrille | August 3, 2019 |
Supporting Cast: David Licauco, Kim Last, Pinky Amador, Sandy Aloba
| 114 | "Positive (Part 1)"; South Korea | Rochelle Pangilinan | Rember Gelera | Troy Espiritu | August 10, 2019 |
Supporting Cast: Bernard Palanca, Mhyca Bautista, Clint Bondad, Marco Alcaraz, Tanya Gomez, Raphael Landicho
| 115 | "Positive (Part 2)"; South Korea | Rochelle Pangilinan | Rember Gelera | Troy Espiritu | August 17, 2019 |
Supporting Cast: Bernard Palanca, Mhyca Bautista, Clint Bondad, Marco Alcaraz, Tanya Gomez, Raphael Landicho
| 116 | "Sex Slave (Part 1)"; Malaysia | Jasmine Curtis-Smith | Nick Olanka | Riza del Rio | August 24, 2019 |
Supporting Cast: Jak Roberto, Art Acuña, April Gustilo, Richard Manabat
| 117 | "Sex Slave (Part 2)"; Malaysia | Jasmine Curtis-Smith | Nick Olanka | Riza del Rio | August 31, 2019 |
Supporting Cast: Jak Roberto, Art Acuña, April Gustilo, Richard Manabat
| 118 | "Serial Killer (Part 1)"; Cyprus | Rhian Ramos | Rember Gelera | Mario Banzon | September 7, 2019 |
Supporting Cast: Juancho Trivino, Benjamin Alves, Diva Montelaba, Analyn Barro, Lara Morena
| 119 | "Serial Killer (Part 2)"; Cyprus | Rhian Ramos | Rember Gelera | Mario Banzon | September 14, 2019 |
Supporting Cast: Juancho Trivino, Benjamin Alves, Diva Montelaba, Analyn Barro, Lara Morena
| 120 | "Yaya CEO (Part 1)"; Hong Kong | Lovi Poe | Zig Dulay | Troy Espiritu | September 21, 2019 |
Supporting Cast: Irma Adlawan, Lito Pimentel, Dexter Doria, Barbara Miguel, Sue Prado, Regine Angeles, Jess Mendoza, Elora Espano
| 121 | "Yaya CEO (Part 2)"; Hong Kong | Lovi Poe | Zig Dulay | James Harvey Estrada; Troy Espiritu | September 28, 2019 |
Supporting Cast: Irma Adlawan, Lito Pimentel, Dexter Doria, Barbara Miguel, Sue Prado, Regine Angeles, Jess Mendoza, Elora Espano
| 122 | "Jackpot (Part 1)"; Saudi Arabia | Buboy Villar; Kiray Celis | Rember Gelera | Jessie Villabrille | October 5, 2019 |
Supporting Cast: Gladys Guevarra, Gene Padilla, Eunice Lagusad
| 123 | "Jackpot (Part 2)"; Saudi Arabia | Buboy Villar; Kiray Celis | Rember Gelera | Jessie Villabrille | October 12, 2019 |
Supporting Cast: Gladys Guevarra, Gene Padilla, Eunice Lagusad
| 124 | "Boss Karyoka (Part 1)"; Hong Kong | Rocco Nacino | King Mark Baco | Troy Espiritu | October 19, 2019 |
Supporting Cast: Empress Schuck, Kim Rodriguez, Suzette Ranillo
| 125 | "Boss Karyoka (Part 2)"; Hong Kong | Rocco Nacino | King Mark Baco | Troy Espiritu | October 26, 2019 |
Supporting Cast: Empress Schuck, Kim Rodriguez, Suzette Ranillo
| 126 | "Haunted Love (Part 1)"; Japan | Valerie Concepcion | Rember Gelera | Jessie Villabrille | November 2, 2019 |
Supporting Cast: Gio Alvarez, Jason Francisco, Ces Quesada, Caprice Cayetano, Mara Lopez
| 127 | "Haunted Love (Part 2)"; Japan | Valerie Concepcion | Rember Gelera | Jessie Villabrille | November 9, 2019 |
Supporting Cast: Gio Alvarez, Jason Francisco, Ces Quesada, Caprice Cayetano, Mara Lopez
| 128 | "Ang Babae sa Buhay ni Ram (Part 1)"; Saudi Arabia | Dionne Monsanto; Ervic Vijandre | King Mark Baco | Jessie Villabrille | November 16, 2019 |
Supporting Cast: Ashley Rivera, Jenzel Angeles, Faye Lorenzo, Gigi Locsin, Jeff Carpio
| 129 | "Ang Babae sa Buhay ni Ram (Part 2)"; Saudi Arabia | Dionne Monsanto; Ervic Vijandre | King Mark Baco | Jessie Villabrille | November 23, 2019 |
Supporting Cast: Jenzel Angeles, Ashley Rivera, Faye Lorenzo, Gigi Locsin, Jeff Carpio
| 130 | "Video Scandal (Part 1)"; Saudi Arabia | Rochelle Pangilinan | Rember Gelera | Jessie Villabrille | November 30, 2019 |
Supporting Cast: Paolo Paraiso, Biboy Ramirez, Mystica, Geleen Eugenio
| 131 | "Video Scandal (Part 2)"; Saudi Arabia | Rochelle Pangilinan | Rember Gelera | Jessie Villabrille | December 7, 2019 |
Supporting Cast: Paolo Paraiso, Biboy Ramirez, Mystica, Geleen Eugenio
| 132 | "Sisters at War (Part 1)"; Hong Kong | Assunta de Rossi; Alessandra de Rossi | King Mark Baco | Jessie Villabrille | December 14, 2019 |
Supporting Cast: Lui Manansala, Rolly Inocencio, Leanne Bautista, Caprice Cayetano, Jett Rai, Rob Moya
| 133 | "Sisters at War (Part 2)"; Hong Kong | Assunta de Rossi; Alessandra de Rossi | King Mark Baco | Troy Espiritu | December 21, 2019 |
Supporting Cast: Lui Manansala, Rolly Inocencio, Leanne Bautista, Caprice Cayetano, Jett Rai, Rob Moya

=== 2020 ===
| No. | Title | Main cast | Directed by | Written by | Original release date |
|---|---|---|---|---|---|
| 134 | "Bayad Danyos (Part 1)"; Saudi Arabia | Diana Zubiri | Rember Gelera | Jessie Villabrille | January 11, 2020 |
Supporting Cast: Eric Fructuoso, Rubi Rubi, Shyr Valdez, Erlinda Villalobos, Raphael Landicho
| 135 | "Bayad Danyos (Part 2)"; Saudi Arabia | Diana Zubiri | Rember Gelera | James Harvey Estrada | January 18, 2020 |
Supporting Cast: Eric Fructuoso, Rubi Rubi, Shyr Valdez, Erlinda Villalobos, Raphael Landicho
| 136 | "Salisi (Part 1)"; Singapore | Maui Taylor | King Mark Baco | Mario Banzon | January 25, 2020 |
Supporting Cast: Rodjun Cruz, Ali Khatibi, Carmi Martin, Jay Arcilla
| 137 | "Salisi (Part 2)"; Singapore | Maui Taylor | King Mark Baco | Mario Banzon | February 1, 2020 |
Supporting Cast: Rodjun Cruz, Ali Khatibi, Carmi Martin, Jay Arcilla
| 138 | "Magkano ang Forever?" | Sunshine Dizon | Rember Gelera | John Lester Malabanan | February 8, 2020 |
Supporting Cast: Adrian Alandy, Maricar de Mesa, Sandy Aloba
| 139 | "Inner Beauty" | Sanya Lopez | Michael Christian Cardoz | Troy Espiritu | February 15, 2020 |
Supporting Cast: Jason Abalos, Mystica, Thia Tomalla
| 140 | "Bilanggo ni Madam (Part 1)" | Prince Clemente | Rember Gelera | John Lester Malabanan | February 22, 2020 |
Supporting Cast: Jean Saburit, Liezel Lopez, Gino Ilustre
| 141 | "Bilanggo ni Madam (Part 2)" | Prince Clemente | Paul Sta. Ana | John Lester Malabanan | February 29, 2020 |
Supporting Cast: Jean Saburit, Liezel Lopez, Gino Ilustre
| 142 | "Xtudent" | Myrtle Sarrosa; Jak Roberto | King Mark Baco | Troy Espiritu | March 7, 2020 |
Supporting Cast: Sherilyn Reyes, Lara Morena, Micko Laurente
| 143 | "Tutor" | Leanne Bautista; Klea Pineda | King Mark Baco | John Lester Malabanan | March 14, 2020 |
Supporting Cast: Glenda Garcia, Alma Concepcion, Lovely Rivero, Mega Unciano
| 144 | "Swap" | LJ Reyes; Edgar Allan Guzman | Nick Olanca | Jesse Villabrille | March 21, 2020 |
Supporting Cast: Boom Labrusca, Ina Feleo, Raphael Landicho
| 145 | "W.F.H. (Worst From Home)" | Katrina Halili | Michael Christian J. Cardoz | John Lester Malabanan | October 3, 2020 |
Supporting Cast: Jason Abalos, Arny Ross, Ali Khatibi
| 146 | "Laman" | Sanya Lopez | Michael Christian J. Cardoz | Troy Espiritu | October 17, 2020 |
Supporting Cast: Glydel Mercado, Manolo Pedrosa
| 147 | "The One That Ran Away (Part 1)" | Kim Molina | Rember Gelera | John Lester Malabanan | November 7, 2020 |
Supporting Cast: Paolo Contis, EA Garcia, Dave Bornea, Didong
| 148 | "The One That Ran Away (Part 2)" | Kim Molina | Rember Gelera | John Lester Malabanan | November 14, 2020 |
Supporting Cast: Paolo Contis, EA Garcia, Dave Bornea, Didong
| 149 | "Hindi Pa Huli ang Pag-ibig (Part 1)" | Cherie Gil | Rember Gelera | Troy Espiritu; Mario Banzon | November 21, 2020 |
Supporting Cast: Jon Lucas, Rochelle Pangilinan, Aira Bermudez, Cecil Paz
| 150 | "Hindi Pa Huli ang Pag-ibig (Part 2)" | Cherie Gil | Rember Gelera | Troy Espiritu; Mario Banzon | November 28, 2020 |
Supporting Cast: Jon Lucas, Rochelle Pangilinan, Aira Bermudez, Cecil Paz
| 151 | "Magkapatid, Magkaagaw (Part 1)" | Kris Bernal | Michael Christian J. Cardoz | John Lester Malabanan | December 5, 2020 |
Supporting Cast: Faye Lorenzo, Diva Montelaba, Yayo Aguila, William Martinez, Marco Alcaraz
| 152 | "Magkapatid, Magkaagaw (Part 2)" | Kris Bernal | Michael Christian J. Cardoz | John Lester Malabanan | December 12, 2020 |
Supporting Cast: Faye Lorenzo, Diva Montelaba, Yayo Aguila, William Martinez, Marco Alcaraz
| 153 | "Regalo (Part 1)" | Rocco Nacino; Max Collins | Nick Olanka | Troy Espiritu | December 19, 2020 |
Supporting Cast: Phoebe Walker, Lovely Rivero, Marx Topacio, Karla Garcia
| 154 | "Regalo (Part 2)" | Rocco Nacino; Max Collins | Nick Olanka | Troy Espiritu | December 26, 2020 |
Supporting Cast: Phoebe Walker, Lovely Rivero, Marx Topacio, Karla Garcia

=== 2021 ===
| No. | Title | Main cast | Directed by | Written by | Original release date |
|---|---|---|---|---|---|
| 155 | "Utol (Part 1)" | Rayver Cruz; Rodjun Cruz | Michael Christian Cardoz | John Lester Malabanan | January 9, 2021 |
Supporting Cast: Myrtle Sarrosa, Shyr Valdez
| 156 | "Utol (Part 2)" | Rayver Cruz; Rodjun Cruz | Michael Christian Cardoz | John Lester Malabanan | January 16, 2021 |
Supporting Cast: Myrtle Sarrosa, Shyr Valdez
| 157 | "Stalker (Part 1)" | Arra San Agustin | Nick Olanka | Mario Banzon | January 23, 2021 |
Supporting Cast: Martin del Rosario, Jeric Gonzales, Cezyl Fermin, Froilan Manto
| 158 | "Stalker (Part 2)" | Arra San Agustin | Nick Olanka | James Harvey Estrada | January 30, 2021 |
Supporting Cast: Martin del Rosario, Jeric Gonzales, Cezyl Fermin, Froilan Manto
| 159 | "Love Delivery (Part 1)" | Klea Pineda; Nicco Manalo | Michael Christian Cardoz | John Lester Malabanan | February 6, 2021 |
Supporting Cast: Dion Ignacio, Pepita Curtis, Gigi Locsin
| 160 | "Love Delivery (Part 2)" | Klea Pineda; Nicco Manalo | Michael Christian Cardoz | John Lester Malabanan | February 13, 2021 |
Supporting Cast: Dion Ignacio, Pepita Curtis, Gigi Locsin
| 161 | "Memory (Part 1)" | Inah de Belen | Nick Olanka | Troy Espiritu | February 20, 2021 |
Supporting Cast: Juancho Triviño, Jak Roberto
| 162 | "Memory (Part 2)" | Inah de Belen | Nick Olanka | Troy Espiritu | February 27, 2021 |
Supporting Cast: Juancho Triviño, Jak Roberto
| 163 | "Dalawa ang Aking Ina (Part 1)" | Aiko Melendez | Michael Christian Cardoz | John Lester Malabanan | March 6, 2021 |
Supporting Cast: Maricar de Mesa, Lexi Gonzales, Jay Arcilla, Arnold Reyes
| 164 | "Dalawa ang Aking Ina (Part 2)" | Aiko Melendez | Michael Christian Cardoz | John Lester Malabanan | March 13, 2021 |
Supporting Cast: Maricar de Mesa, Lexi Gonzales, Jay Arcilla, Arnold Reyes
| 165 | "Bekiry (Part 1)" | Jaclyn Jose | Nick Olanka | Mario Banzon | March 20, 2021 |
Supporting Cast: Alchris Galura, Prince Stefan, Kate Valdez, Nikki Co, Jeffrey Santos
| 166 | "Bekiry (Part 2)" | Jaclyn Jose | Nick Olanka | James Harvey Estrada | March 27, 2021 |
Supporting Cast: Alchris Galura, Prince Stefan, Kate Valdez, Nikki Co, Jeffrey Santos
| 167 | "Fake Healer (Part 1)" | Alma Moreno | Michael Christian Cardoz | John Lester Malabanan | May 15, 2021 |
Supporting Cast: Vandolph, Samantha Lopez, Jeremy Sabido, Erin Ocampo
| 168 | "Fake Healer (Part 2)" | Alma Moreno | Michael Christian Cardoz | Mario Banzon | May 22, 2021 |
Supporting Cast: Vandolph, Samantha Lopez, Jeremy Sabido, Erin Ocampo
| 169 | "Senior Love (Part 1)" | Tonton Gutierrez | Rember Gelera | Troy Espiritu | May 29, 2021 |
Supporting Cast: Maui Taylor, Meg Imperial, James Teng, Joseph Bitangcol, Jess Mendoza
| 170 | "Senior Love (Part 2)" | Tonton Gutierrez | Rember Gelera | Troy Espiritu | June 5, 2021 |
Supporting Cast: Maui Taylor, Meg Imperial, James Teng, Joseph Bitangcol, Jess Mendoza
| 171 | "Ang Lihim ni Ellen (Part 1)" | LJ Reyes | Michael Christian Cardoz | Mario Banzon | June 12, 2021 |
Supporting Cast: Pancho Magno, Winwyn Marquez, Joaquin Manansala, Skelly
| 172 | "Ang Lihim ni Ellen (Part 2)" | LJ Reyes | Michael Christian Cardoz | Mario Banzon | June 19, 2021 |
Supporting Cast: Pancho Magno, Winwyn Marquez, Joaquin Manansala, Skelly
| 173 | "Be(a)st Friends Forever (Part 1)" | Gelli de Belen; Candy Pangilinan | Nick Olanka | James Harvey Estrada | June 26, 2021 |
Supporting Cast: Ayra Mariano, Claire Castro, Ralph Noriega, Mark Dionisio
| 174 | "Be(a)st Friends Forever (Part 2)" | Gelli de Belen; Candy Pangilinan | Nick Olanka | James Harvey Estrada | July 3, 2021 |
Supporting Cast: Ayra Mariano, Claire Castro, Ralph Noriega, Mark Dionisio
| 175 | "Inang Laya (Part 1)" | Snooky Serna | Michael Christian Cardoz | Mario Banzon | July 10, 2021 |
Supporting Cast: Jeric Gonzales, Mon Confiado, Maureen Larrazabal
| 176 | "Inang Laya (Part 2)" | Snooky Serna | Michael Christian Cardoz | Mario Banzon | July 17, 2021 |
Supporting Cast: Jeric Gonzales, Mon Confiado, Maureen Larrazabal
| 177 | "Online Sabong (Part 1)" | Rodjun Cruz | Rember Gelera | Troy Espiritu | July 24, 2021 |
Supporting Cast: Kris Bernal, Martin Escudero, Nonie Buencamino
| 178 | "Online Sabong (Part 2)" | Rodjun Cruz | Rember Gelera | Troy Espiritu | July 31, 2021 |
Supporting Cast: Kris Bernal, Martin Escudero, Nonie Buencamino
| 179 | "Sekyu in the City (Part 1)" | Mike Tan; Jennica Garcia | King Mark Baco | John Lester Malabanan | August 7, 2021 |
Supporting Cast: Gardo Versoza, Melissa Mendez, Hannah Precillas
| 180 | "Sekyu in the City (Part 2)" | Mike Tan; Jennica Garcia | King Mark Baco | John Lester Malabanan | August 14, 2021 |
Supporting Cast: Gardo Versoza, Melissa Mendez, Hannah Precillas
| 181 | "Hating Kapatid (Part 1)" | Yasser Marta | Rember Gelera | James Harvey Estrada | August 21, 2021 |
Supporting Cast: Valerie Concepcion, Lucho Ayala, Elle Villanueva, Ces Quesada
| 182 | "Hating Kapatid (Part 2)" | Yasser Marta | Rember Gelera | James Harvey Estrada | August 28, 2021 |
Supporting Cast: Valerie Concepcion, Lucho Ayala, Elle Villanueva, Ces Quesada
| 183 | "Maid 4 U (Part 1)" | Kiray Celis; Divine Aucina | Michael Christian Cardoz | John Lester Malabanan | September 4, 2021 |
Supporting Cast: Jose Sarasola, Jennie Gabriel, Gene Padilla, Migs Villasis
| 184 | "Maid 4 U (Part 2)" | Kiray Celis; Divine Aucina | Michael Christian Cardoz | John Lester Malabanan | September 11, 2021 |
Supporting Cast: Jose Sarasola, Jennie Gabriel, Gene Padilla, Migs Villasis
| 185 | "In the Name of Love (Part 1)" | Rochelle Pangilinan; Neil Ryan Sese | Rember Gelera | Troy Espiritu | September 18, 2021 |
Supporting Cast: Marco Alcaraz, Maricar de Mesa, Tanya Gomez, Ella Cristofani
| 186 | "In the Name of Love (Part 2)" | Rochelle Pangilinan; Neil Ryan Sese | Rember Gelera | Troy Espiritu | September 25, 2021 |
Supporting Cast: Marco Alcaraz, Maricar de Mesa, Tanya Gomez, Ella Cristofani
| 187 | "Daddy's Girl (Part 1)" | Kim Rodriguez | Michael Christian Cardoz | John Lester Malabanan | October 2, 2021 |
Supporting Cast: Royce Cabrera, Raymond Bagatsing, Bryan Benedict
| 188 | "Daddy's Girl (Part 2)" | Kim Rodriguez | Michael Christian Cardoz | John Lester Malabanan | October 9, 2021 |
Supporting Cast: Royce Cabrera, Raymond Bagatsing, Bryan Benedict
| 189 | "Speed of Love (Part 1)" | Inah de Belen | Michael Christian Cardoz | Jessie Villabrille | October 16, 2021 |
Supporting Cast: Paul Salas, Samantha Lopez, Nikki Co
| 190 | "Speed of Love (Part 2)" | Inah de Belen | Michael Christian Cardoz | Jessie Villabrille | October 23, 2021 |
Supporting Cast: Paul Salas, Samantha Lopez, Nikki Co
| 191 | "Hulog ng Langit (Part 1)" | Ruru Madrid; Shaira Diaz | Michael Christian Cardoz | John Lester Malabanan | October 30, 2021 |
Supporting Cast: Allan Paule, Luke Conde, Glenda Garcia
| 192 | "Hulog ng Langit (Part 2)" | Ruru Madrid; Shaira Diaz | Michael Christian Cardoz | John Lester Malabanan | November 6, 2021 |
Supporting Cast: Allan Paule, Luke Conde, Glenda Garcia
| 193 | "Sa Ngalan ng Ama (Part 1)" | Gabby Concepcion; Eula Valdez | Rember Gelera | Troy Espiritu | November 13, 2021 |
Supporting Cast: Thea Tolentino, Ariella Arida, Bubbles Paraiso
| 194 | "Sa Ngalan ng Ama (Part 2)" | Gabby Concepcion; Eula Valdez | Rember Gelera | Troy Espiritu | November 20, 2021 |
Supporting Cast: Thea Tolentino, Ariella Arida, Bubbles Paraiso
| 195 | "Kabayaran (Part 1)" | Bianca Umali; Rita Daniela; Jak Roberto | Rember Gelera | Reign Andre Loleng | November 27, 2021 |
Supporting Cast: Almira Muhlach, Jeric Raval, Nico Locco, Bench Hipolito, Coleen Paz
| 196 | "Kabayaran (Part 2)" | Bianca Umali; Rita Daniela; Jak Roberto | Rember Gelera | Reign Andre Loleng | December 4, 2021 |
Supporting Cast: Almira Muhlach, Nico Locco, Bench Hipolito, Coleen Paz
| 197 | "Ambisyon (Part 1)" | Klea Pineda | Rember Gelera | Borgy Danao | December 11, 2021 |
Supporting Cast: Tetchie Agbayani, Andrea del Rosario, Marco Alcaraz, Mary Jean Lastimosa, Anjo Damiles, Jess Mendoza
| 198 | "Ambisyon (Part 2)" | Klea Pineda | Rember Gelera | Borgy Danao | December 18, 2021 |
Supporting Cast: Tetchie Agbayani, Andrea del Rosario, Marco Alcaraz, Mary Jean Lastimosa, Anjo Damiles, Jess Mendoza
| 199 | "Tres Marias (Part 1)" | Kris Bernal; Kim Rodriguez; Joyce Ching | Rommel Penesa | Adam Cornelius Asin | December 25, 2021 |
Supporting Cast: Biboy Ramirez, Gilleth Sandico, Anton Amoncio

=== 2022 ===
| No. | Title | Main cast | Directed by | Written by | Original release date |
|---|---|---|---|---|---|
| 200 | "Tres Marias (Part 2)" | Kris Bernal; Kim Rodriguez; Joyce Ching | Rommel Penesa | Adam Cornelius Asin | January 1, 2022 |
Supporting Cast: Biboy Ramirez, Gilleth Sandico, Anton Amoncio
| 201 | "Kasalanan (Part 1)" | Vin Abrenica; Maui Taylor; Mark Herras | Rommel Penesa | James Harvey Estrada | January 8, 2022 |
Supporting Cast: Ella Cristofani, Kim De Leon, Crystal Paras, Bryan Benedict
| 202 | "Kasalanan (Part 2)" | Vin Abrenica; Maui Taylor; Mark Herras | Rommel Penesa | James Harvey Estrada | January 15, 2022 |
Supporting Cast: Ella Cristofani, Kim De Leon, Crystal Paras, Bryan Benedict
| 203 | "Utol" | Rayver Cruz; Rodjun Cruz | Michael Christian Cardoz | John Lester Malabanan | January 22, 2022 |
Note: Replay story on January 9 & 16, 2021. Supporting Cast: Myrtle Sarrosa, Shyr Valdez
| 204 | "Bekiry" | Jaclyn Jose | Nick Olanka | Mario Banzon | January 29, 2022 |
Note: Replay story on March 20 & 27, 2021. Supporting Cast: Alchris Galura, Prince Stefan, Kate Valdez, Nikki Co, Jeffrey Santos
| 205 | "Suspetsa (Part 1)" | Rere Madrid; Shanelle Agustin | Sigrid Andrea Bernardo | John Borgy Danao | February 5, 2022 |
Supporting Cast: Gardo Versoza, Rita Avila, Sue Prado, Janna Dominguez, Migs Villasis, Therese Malvar, Gab Yabut
| 206 | "Suspetsa (Part 2)" | Rere Madrid; Shanelle Agustin | Sigrid Andrea Bernardo | John Borgy Danao | February 12, 2022 |
Supporting Cast: Gardo Versoza, Rita Avila, Sue Prado, Janna Dominguez, Migs Villasis, Therese Malvar, Gab Yabut
| 207 | "Tahanan" (Japan) | Valerie Concepcion | Monti Parungao | Tonio Rodulfo | February 19, 2022 |
Supporting Cast: Gary Estrada, Polo Ravales, Jenny Miller, Lime Aranya
| 208 | "The Wedding" (Hong Kong) | Glaiza de Castro | Monti Parungao | Adam Cornelius Asin | February 26, 2022 |
Supporting Cast: Dion Ignacio, Jon Lucas, Herlene Budol
| 209 | "The Stepdaughter (Part 1)" | Max Collins | Jojo Nadela | Erwin Caezar Bravo | March 5, 2022 |
Supporting Cast: Rafael Rosell, Geneva Cruz, Leandro Baldemor, Angela Alarcon, Yesh Bruce
| 210 | "The Stepdaughter (Part 2)" | Max Collins | Jojo Nadela | Erwin Caezar Bravo | March 12, 2022 |
Supporting Cast: Rafael Rosell, Geneva Cruz, Leandro Baldemor, Angela Alarcon, Yesh Bruce
| 211 | "My Batangueño Lover (Part 1)" | Jay Manalo; Candy Pangilinan | Monti Parungao | Adam Cornelius Asin | March 19, 2022 |
Supporting Cast: Maricar de Mesa, Nova Villa, Crystal Paras, Micko Bañares Laurente, Dyosa Pockoh
| 212 | "My Batangueño Lover (Part 2)" | Jay Manalo; Candy Pangilinan | Monti Parungao | Adam Cornelius Asin | March 26, 2022 |
Supporting Cast: Maricar de Mesa, Nova Villa, Crystal Paras, Micko Bañares Laurente, Dyosa Pockoh
| 213 | "Two Mothers (Part 1)" | Jo Berry; Kris Bernal | Paul Sta. Ana | Erwin Caezar Bravo | April 2, 2022 |
Supporting Cast: Mike Tan, Lovely Rivero, Barbara Miguel
| 214 | "Two Mothers (Part 2)" | Jo Berry; Kris Bernal | Paul Sta. Ana | Erwin Caezar Bravo | April 9, 2022 |
Supporting Cast: Mike Tan, Lovely Rivero, Barbara Miguel
| 215 | "Sikreto (Part 1)" | Irma Adlawan | Rommel Penesa | Adam Cornelius Asin | April 23, 2022 |
Supporting Cast: Arra San Agustin, Ashley Ortega, Rufa Mae Quinto, Topper Fabregas, Luis Hontiveros, Regine Angeles, Gilleth Sandico
| 216 | "Sikreto (Part 2)" | Irma Adlawan | Rommel Penesa | Adam Cornelius Asin | April 30, 2022 |
Supporting Cast: Arra San Agustin, Ashley Ortega, Rufa Mae Quinto, Topper Fabregas, Luis Hontiveros, Regine Angeles, Gilleth Sandico
| 217 | "Kakambal Kaagaw (Part 1)" | Rita Daniela | Michael Christian Cardoz | Erwin Caezar Bravo | May 14, 2022 |
Supporting Cast: Paul Salas, Lilet, Pinky Amador, Mia Pangyarihan, Trixie Lalaine
| 218 | "Kakambal Kaagaw (Part 2)" | Rita Daniela | Michael Christian Cardoz | Erwin Caezar Bravo | May 21, 2022 |
Supporting Cast: Paul Salas, Lilet, Pinky Amador, Mia Pangyarihan, Trixie Lalaine
| 219 | "Ina, Anak, Asawa (Part 1)" | Faith da Silva | Paul Sta. Ana | Erwin Caezar Bravo | May 28, 2022 |
Supporting Cast: Ina Raymundo, Akihiro Blanco, Allan Paule, Althea Ablan, Jenzel Angeles, JC Tan, Katkat Dasalla, Wenggay Concepcion
| 220 | "Ina, Anak, Asawa (Part 2)" | Faith da Silva | Paul Sta. Ana | Erwin Caezar Bravo | June 4, 2022 |
Supporting Cast: Ina Raymundo, Akihiro Blanco, Allan Paule, Althea Ablan, Jenzel Angeles, JC Tan, Katkat Dasalla, Wenggay Concepcion
| 221 | "Heredera (Part 1)" | Klea Pineda | Jojo Nadela | Adam Cornelius Asin | June 11, 2022 |
Supporting Cast: Ana Roces, Tonton Gutierrez, Andrea Del Rosario, Jon Lucas, Anna Vicente, Dexter Doria, Cheche Tolentino, Jet Rai
| 222 | "Heredera (Part 2)" | Klea Pineda | Jojo Nadela | Adam Cornelius Asin | June 18, 2022 |
Supporting Cast: Ana Roces, Tonton Gutierrez, Andrea Del Rosario, Jon Lucas, Anna Vicente, Dexter Doria, Cheche Tolentino, Jet Rai
| 223 | "Ligaya (Part 1)" | Rhian Ramos | Paul Sta. Ana | Erwin Caezar Bravo | June 25, 2022 |
Supporting Cast: Victor Silayan, Luis Hontiveros, Anjo Damiles, Leandro Baldemor, Bryan Benedict, Angela Alarcon, Ashley Sarmiento, Jess Mendoza
| 224 | "Ligaya (Part 2)" | Rhian Ramos | Paul Sta. Ana | Erwin Caezar Bravo | July 2, 2022 |
Supporting Cast: Victor Silayan, Luis Hontiveros, Anjo Damiles, Leandro Baldemor, Bryan Benedict, Angela Alarcon, Ashley Sarmiento, Jess Mendoza
| 225 | "Tayong Dalawa (Part 1)" | Ricky Davao; Jillian Ward | Jojo Nadela | Adam Cornelius Asin | July 9, 2022 |
Supporting Cast: Maxine Medina, Lance Serrano, Christian Antolin, Arvic Tan, Joyang
| 226 | "Tayong Dalawa (Part 2)" | Ricky Davao; Jillian Ward | Jojo Nadela | Adam Cornelius Asin | July 16, 2022 |
Supporting Cast: Maxine Medina, Lance Serrano, Christian Antolin, Arvic Tan, Joyang
| 227 | "Isabella (Part 1)" | Althea Ablan; Elijah Alejo | Rommel Penesa | Aeious Asin | July 23, 2022 |
Supporting Cast: Ara Mina, Geneva Cruz, Bobby Andrews, Will Ashley, Odette Khan, Zyren dela Cruz Note: This is the first episode with 3-part episode.
| 228 | "Isabella (Part 2)" | Althea Ablan; Elijah Alejo | Rommel Penesa | Aeious Asin | July 30, 2022 |
Supporting Cast: Ara Mina, Geneva Cruz, Bobby Andrews, Will Ashley, Odette Khan, Zyren dela Cruz
| 229 | "Isabella (Part 3)" | Althea Ablan; Elijah Alejo | Rommel Penesa | Aeious Asin | August 6, 2022 |
Supporting Cast: Ara Mina, Geneva Cruz, Bobby Andrews, Will Ashley, Odette Khan, Zyren dela Cruz
| 230 | "Babawiin ko ang Langit (Part 1)" | Arra San Agustin | Rommel Penesa | Adam Cornelius Asin | August 13, 2022 |
Supporting Cast: Christopher de Leon, Sunshine Cruz, Jason Abalos, Ashley Ortega, Rodjun Cruz, Cai Cortez, Kimson Tan, Gilleth Sandico
| 231 | "Babawiin ko ang Langit (Part 2)" | Arra San Agustin | Rommel Penesa | Adam Cornelius Asin | August 20, 2022 |
Supporting Cast: Christopher de Leon, Sunshine Cruz, Jason Abalos, Ashley Ortega, Rodjun Cruz, Cai Cortez, Kimson Tan, Gilleth Sandico
| 232 | "Babawiin ko ang Langit (Part 3)" | Arra San Agustin | Rommel Penesa | Adam Cornelius Asin | August 27, 2022 |
Supporting Cast: Christopher de Leon, Sunshine Cruz, Jason Abalos, Ashley Ortega, Rodjun Cruz, Cai Cortez, Kimson Tan, Gilleth Sandico
| 233 | "Kasalanan" | Vin Abrenica; Maui Taylor; Mark Herras | Rommel Penesa | James Harvey Estrada | September 3, 2022 |
Note: Replay story on January 8 & 15, 2022. Supporting Cast: Ella Cristofani, Kim De Leon, Crystal Paras, Bryan Benedict
| 234 | "Hanggang Kailan (Part 1)" | Claudine Barretto; Gladys Reyes; Katrina Halili | Rommel Penesa | Aeious Asin | September 10, 2022 |
Supporting Cast: Sofia Pablo, Allen Ansay, Allen Dizon, Marco Alcaraz, Marco Masa, Earl Ignacio, Shido Roxas
| 235 | "Hanggang Kailan (Part 2)" | Sofia Pablo; Allen Ansay | Rommel Penesa | Aeious Asin | September 17, 2022 |
Supporting Cast: Claudine Barretto, Katrina Halili, Gladys Reyes, Allen Dizon, Marco Alcaraz, Marco Masa, Earl Ignacio, Shido Roxas
| 236 | "Hanggang Kailan (Part 3)" | Claudine Barretto; Sofia Pablo | Rommel Penesa | Aeious Asin | September 24, 2022 |
Supporting Cast: Katrina Halili, Gladys Reyes, Allen Ansay, Allen Dizon, Marco Alcaraz, Marco Masa, Earl Ignacio, Shido Roxas
| 237 | "Hanggang Kailan (Finale)" | Claudine Barretto; Sofia Pablo; Allen Ansay; Allen Dizon | Rommel Penesa | Aeious Asin | October 1, 2022 |
Supporting Cast: Katrina Halili, Gladys Reyes, Marco Alcaraz, Marco Masa, Earl Ignacio, Shido Roxas
| 238 | "Baliw na Puso (Part 1)" | Mylene Dizon; Raymond Bagatsing | Rommel Penesa | Aeious Asin | October 8, 2022 |
Supporting Cast: Vaness del Moral, Lianne Valentin, Simon Ibarra, Tart Carlos, Via Antonio, Erlinda Villalobos
| 239 | "Baliw na Puso (Part 2)" | Mylene Dizon; Lianne Valentin | Rommel Penesa | Aeious Asin | October 15, 2022 |
Supporting Cast: Raymond Bagatsing, Vaness del Moral, Simon Ibarra, Tart Carlos, Via Antonio
| 240 | "Baliw na Puso (Part 3)" | Mylene Dizon; Lianne Valentin | Rommel Penesa | Aeious Asin | October 22, 2022 |
Supporting Cast: Raymond Bagatsing, Vaness del Moral, Simon Ibarra, Tart Carlos, Via Antonio
| 241 | "Akin ang Bukas (Part 1)" | Kris Bernal; Boom Labrusca | Jojo Nadela; Rommel Penesa | Troy Espiritu | October 29, 2022 |
Supporting Cast: Shamaine Buencamino, Maui Taylor, Lara Morena, Rolando Innocencio
| 242 | "Akin ang Bukas (Part 2)" | Kris Bernal; Boom Labrusca | Jojo Nadela; Rommel Penesa | Troy Espiritu | November 5, 2022 |
Supporting Cast: Shamaine Buencamino, Maui Taylor, Shanelle Agustin, Rhys Miguel, Lance Raymundo
| 243 | "Akin ang Bukas (Part 3)" | Kris Bernal; Boom Labrusca | Jojo Nadela; Rommel Penesa | Troy Espiritu | November 12, 2022 |
Supporting Cast: Shamaine Buencamino, Maui Taylor, Shanelle Agustin, Rhys Miguel, Lance Raymundo
| 244 | "Ma'am (Part 1)" | Max Collins; Yasser Marta | Rommel Penesa | Rusty Guarin | November 19, 2022 |
Supporting Cast: Liezel Lopez, Lovely Rivero, Sammantha Lopez, Anjay Anson, Ced Torrecarion, Chris Leonardo, Lady Gagita
| 245 | "Ma'am (Part 2)" | Max Collins; Yasser Marta | Rommel Penesa | Rusty Guarin | November 26, 2022 |
Supporting Cast: Liezel Lopez, Lovely Rivero, Sammantha Lopez, Anjay Anson, Ced Torrecarion, Chris Leonardo, Lady Gagita
| 246 | "Ma'am (Part 3)" | Max Collins; Yasser Marta | Rommel Penesa | Rusty Guarin | December 3, 2022 |
Supporting Cast: Liezel Lopez, Lovely Rivero, Sammantha Lopez, Anjay Anson, Ced Torrecarion, Chris Leonardo, Lady Gagita
| 247 | "Pahiram ng Pasko (Part 1)" | Eula Valdez; Meg Imperial; Nikki Co | Jojo Nadela | John Lester Malabanan | December 10, 2022 |
Supporting Cast: Jenine Desiderio, Akihiro Blanco, Rubi Rubi, Boogie Bugayong, Bernicular
| 248 | "Pahiram ng Pasko (Part 2)" | Eula Valdez; Meg Imperial; Nikki Co | Jojo Nadela | John Lester Malabanan | December 17, 2022 |
Supporting Cast: Jenine Desiderio, Akihiro Blanco, Rubi Rubi, Boogie Bugayong, Bernicular
| 249 | "Pahiram ng Pasko (Part 3)" | Eula Valdez; Meg Imperial; Nikki Co | Jojo Nadela | John Lester Malabanan | December 24, 2022 |
Supporting Cast: Jenine Desiderio, Akihiro Blanco, Rubi Rubi, Boogie Bugayong, Bernicular

=== 2023 ===
| No. | Title | Main cast | Directed by | Written by | Original release date |
|---|---|---|---|---|---|
| 250 | "Hubad na Katotohanan (Part 1)" (Japan) | Edgar Allan Guzman; Shaira Diaz | Rommel Penesa | Carlo Obispo | January 14, 2023 |
Supporting Cast: Jelai Andres, Lui Manansala, DJ Durano, Rhed Bustamante, Migs Villasis, Christian Antolin
| 251 | "Hubad na Katotohanan (Part 2)" | Edgar Allan Guzman; Shaira Diaz | Rommel Penesa | Carlo Obispo | January 21, 2023 |
Supporting Cast: Jelai Andres, Lui Manansala, DJ Durano, Rhed Bustamante, Migs Villasis, Christian Antolin
| 252 | "Hubad na Katotohanan (Part 3)" | Edgar Allan Guzman; Shaira Diaz | Rommel Penesa | Carlo Obispo | January 28, 2023 |
Supporting Cast: Jelai Andres, Lui Manansala, DJ Durano, Rhed Bustamante, Migs Villasis, Christian Antolin
| 253 | "Nympha (Part 1)" | Sanya Lopez; Lianne Valentin | Jojo Nadela | John Lester Malabanan | February 4, 2023 |
Supporting Cast: Gil Cuerva, Royce Cabrera, Mel Kimura, Joyang, Tabs Sumulong
| 254 | "Nympha (Part 2)" | Sanya Lopez; Lianne Valentin | Jojo Nadela | John Lester Malabanan | February 11, 2023 |
Supporting Cast: Gil Cuerva, Royce Cabrera, Mel Kimura, Joyang, Tabs Sumulong
| 255 | "Nympha (Part 3)" | Sanya Lopez; Lianne Valentin | Jojo Nadela | John Lester Malabanan | February 18, 2023 |
Supporting Cast: Gil Cuerva, Royce Cabrera, Mel Kimura, Joyang, Tabs Sumulong
| 256 | "Pangarap (Part 1)" | Liezel Lopez | Rommel Penesa | Juan Gabriel Lopez | February 25, 2023 |
Supporting Cast: Geneva Cruz, Maricar de Mesa, Ricardo Cepeda, Luis Hontiveros, Shyr Valdez, Gigi Locsin, Andrew Gan, Trixie Fabricante
| 257 | "Pangarap (Part 2)" | Liezel Lopez | Rommel Penesa | Juan Gabriel Lopez | March 4, 2023 |
Supporting Cast: Geneva Cruz, Maricar de Mesa, Ricardo Cepeda, Luis Hontiveros, Shyr Valdez, Gigi Locsin, Andrew Gan, Trixie Fabricante
| 258 | "Pangarap (Part 3)" | Liezel Lopez | Rommel Penesa | Juan Gabriel Lopez | March 11, 2023 |
Supporting Cast: Geneva Cruz, Maricar de Mesa, Ricardo Cepeda, Luis Hontiveros, Shyr Valdez, Gigi Locsin, Andrew Gan, Trixie Fabricante
| 259 | "Penitensya (Part 1)" | Thea Tolentino | Jojo Nadela | John Lester Malabanan | March 18, 2023 |
Supporting Cast: Dion Ignacio, Jan Marini, Tina Paner, Smokey Manaloto, Mosang, Eulene Castro
| 260 | "Penitensya (Part 2)" | Thea Tolentino | Jojo Nadela | John Lester Malabanan | March 25, 2023 |
Supporting Cast: Dion Ignacio, Juancho Trivino, Jan Marini, Tina Paner, Smokey Manaloto, Mosang, Eulene Castro
| 261 | "Penitensya (Part 3)" | Thea Tolentino | Jojo Nadela | John Lester Malabanan | April 1, 2023 |
Supporting Cast: Dion Ignacio, Juancho Trivino, Jan Marini, Tina Paner, Smokey Manaloto, Mosang, Eulene Castro
| 262 | "My Golden Love (Part 1)" | Irma Adlawan; Marco Alcaraz | Monti Parungao | Juan Gabriel Lopez | April 15, 2023 |
Supporting Cast: Althea Ablan, Analyn Barro, Jess Mendoza, Elle Ramirez, Raquel Pareño, Marc Daniel Bernardo, Ida Pomarejos
| 263 | "My Golden Love (Part 2)" | Irma Adlawan; Marco Alcaraz | Monti Parungao | Juan Gabriel Lopez | April 22, 2023 |
Supporting Cast: Althea Ablan, Analyn Barro, Jess Mendoza, Elle Ramirez, Raquel Pareño, Marc Daniel Bernardo, Ida Pomarejos
| 264 | "My Golden Love (Part 3)" | Irma Adlawan; Marco Alcaraz | Monti Parungao | Juan Gabriel Lopez | April 29, 2023 |
Supporting Cast: Althea Ablan, Analyn Barro, Jess Mendoza, Elle Ramirez, Raquel Pareño, Marc Daniel Bernardo, Ida Pomarejos
| 265 | "Tahanan (Part 1)" | Lotlot de Leon | Jojo Nadela | John Lester Malabanan | May 6, 2023 |
Supporting Cast: Boom Labrusca, Arra San Agustin, Kim de Leon, Shanelle Agustin, Gigi Locsin, Ralph Alfaro
| 266 | "Tahanan (Part 2)" | Lotlot de Leon | Jojo Nadela | John Lester Malabanan | May 13, 2023 |
Supporting Cast: Boom Labrusca, Arra San Agustin, Kim de Leon, Shanelle Agustin, Gigi Locsin, Ralph Alfaro
| 267 | "Tahanan (Part 3)" | Lotlot de Leon | Jojo Nadela | John Lester Malabanan | May 20, 2023 |
Supporting Cast: Boom Labrusca, Arra San Agustin, Kim de Leon, Shanelle Agustin, Gigi Locsin, Ralph Alfaro
| 268 | "Reunion (Part 1)" | Elle Villanueva; Faye Lorenzo | Rommel Penesa | Juan Gabriel Lopez | May 27, 2023 |
Supporting Cast: Jon Lucas, Richard Quan, Jenny Miller, Tanya Gomez, Jay Arcilla, Angelica Jones, Dior Veneracion, Therese Tiangco
| 269 | "Reunion (Part 2)" | Elle Villanueva; Faye Lorenzo | Rommel Penesa | Juan Gabriel Lopez | June 3, 2023 |
Supporting Cast: Jon Lucas, Jay Arcilla, Richard Quan, Tanya Gomez, Jenny Miller, Angelica Jones, Dior Veneracion, Therese Tiangco
| 270 | "Reunion (Part 3)" | Elle Villanueva; Faye Lorenzo | Rommel Penesa | Juan Gabriel Lopez | June 10, 2023 |
Supporting Cast: Jon Lucas, Jenny Miller, Jay Arcilla, Richard Quan, Angelica Jones, Tanya Gomez, Dior Veneracion, Therese Tiangco
| 271 | "Pagtakas sa Kahapon (Part 1)" | Sanya Lopez; Jeric Gonzales | Jojo Nadela | Juan Gabriel Lopez | June 17, 2023 |
Supporting Cast: Bernadette Allyson, Ynez Veneracion, Christian Vasquez, Lady Gagita
| 272 | "Pagtakas sa Kahapon (Part 2)" | Sanya Lopez; Jeric Gonzales | Jojo Nadela | Juan Gabriel Lopez | June 24, 2023 |
Supporting Cast: Bernadette Allyson, Ynez Veneracion, Lady Gagita, Ice Arago, Rio Mizu
| 273 | "Pagtakas sa Kahapon (Part 3)" | Sanya Lopez; Jeric Gonzales | Jojo Nadela | Juan Gabriel Lopez | July 1, 2023 |
Supporting Cast: Bernadette Allyson, Ynez Veneracion, Lady Gagita, Ice Arago, Rio Mizu
| 274 | "The Sisters (Part 1)" | Mikee Quintos; Klea Pineda; Kimson Tan | Rommel Penesa | Juan Gabriel Lopez | July 15, 2023 |
Supporting Cast: Andrea del Rosario, Joshua Zamora, Via Veloso, Momshie Odille, Jayjay Jonson
| 275 | "The Sisters (Part 2)" | Mikee Quintos; Klea Pineda; Kimson Tan | Rommel Penesa | Juan Gabriel Lopez | July 22, 2023 |
Supporting Cast: Andrea del Rosario, Joshua Zamora, Via Veloso, Momshie Odille, Jayjay Jonson
| 276 | "The Sisters (Part 3)" | Mikee Quintos; Klea Pineda; Kimson Tan | Rommel Penesa | Juan Gabriel Lopez | July 29, 2023 |
Supporting Cast: Andrea del Rosario, Joshua Zamora, Via Veloso, Momshie Odille, Jayjay Jonson
| 277 | "Ang Pagtatapos (Part 1)" | Ashley Ortega; Pauline Mendoza | Jojo Nadela | Juan Gabriel Lopez | August 5, 2023 |
Supporting Cast: Radson Flores, Rere Madrid, Shuvee Etrata, Jenine Desiderio, Marnie Lapus, Eye Borja, Boogie Bugayaong, Gino Ilustre, Seb Pajarillo
| 278 | "Ang Pagtatapos (Part 2)" | Ashley Ortega; Pauline Mendoza | Jojo Nadela | Juan Gabriel Lopez | August 12, 2023 |
Supporting Cast: Radson Flores, Rere Madrid, Shuvee Etrata, Jenine Desiderio, Marnie Lapus, Eye Borja, Boogie Bugayaong, Gino Ilustre
| 279 | "Ang Pagtatapos (Part 3)" | Ashley Ortega; Pauline Mendoza | Jojo Nadela | Juan Gabriel Lopez | August 19, 2023 |
Supporting Cast: Radson Flores, Rere Madrid, Shuvee Etrata, Jenine Desiderio, Marnie Lapus, Eye Borja, Boogie Bugayaong, Gino Ilustre
| 280 | "Bayad Utang (Part 1)" | Rochelle Pangilinan; Maricar de Mesa | Michael Christian J. Cardoz | Micaela Rodriguez | August 26, 2023 |
Supporting Cast: Alvin Fortuna, Mark Dionisio, Rich Reginaldo, Alexander Lucas Martin, Brianna Advincula
| 281 | "Bayad Utang (Part 2)" | Rochelle Pangilinan; Maricar de Mesa | Michael Christian J. Cardoz | Micaela Rodriguez | September 2, 2023 |
Supporting Cast: Elijah Alejo, Zyren dela Cruz, Rich Reginaldo, Mark Dionisio
| 282 | "Bayad Utang (Part 3)" | Rochelle Pangilinan; Maricar de Mesa | Michael Christian J. Cardoz | Micaela Rodriguez | September 9, 2023 |
Supporting Cast: Elijah Alejo, Zyren dela Cruz, Rich Reginaldo, Mark Dionisio
| 283 | "Gambling for Love (Part 1)" | Thea Tolentino; Rodjun Cruz | Jojo Nadela | Juan Gabriel Lopez | September 16, 2023 |
Supporting Cast: Sheree Bautista, Rubi Rubi, Phi Palmos, Fela Austin
| 284 | "Gambling for Love (Part 2)" | Thea Tolentino; Rodjun Cruz | Jojo Nadela | Juan Gabriel Lopez | September 23, 2023 |
Supporting Cast: Sheree Bautista, Manolo Pedrosa, Rubi Rubi, Phi Palmos, Fela Austin
| 285 | "Gambling for Love (Part 3)" | Thea Tolentino; Rodjun Cruz | Jojo Nadela | Juan Gabriel Lopez | September 30, 2023 |
Supporting Cast: Sheree Bautista, Manolo Pedrosa, Rubi Rubi, Phi Palmos, Fela Austin
| 286 | "Babawiin ko ang Langit" | Arra San Agustin | Rommel Penesa | Adam Cornelius Asin | October 7, 2023 |
Supporting Cast: Christopher de Leon, Sunshine Cruz, Jason Abalos, Ashley Ortega, Rodjun Cruz, Cai Cortez, Kimson Tan, Gilleth Sandico Note: Replay story on August 13, 20 & 27, 2022.
| 287 | "Ganti (Part 1)" | Winwyn Marquez; Pancho Magno | Michael Christian Cardoz | Micaela Rodriguez | October 14, 2023 |
Supporting Cast: Maui Taylor, Shido Roxas, Princess Aliyah, Bryce Eusebio, Jim Pebanco, Chloe Redondo, Mark Saruray
| 288 | "Ganti (Part 2)" | Winwyn Marquez; Pancho Magno | Michael Christian Cardoz | Micaela Rodriguez | October 21, 2023 |
Supporting Cast: Maui Taylor, Shido Roxas, Princess Aliyah, Bryce Eusebio, Jim Pebanco, Chloe Redondo, Mark Saruray
| 289 | "Ganti (Part 3)" | Winwyn Marquez; Pancho Magno | Michael Christian Cardoz | Micaela Rodriguez | October 28, 2023 |
Supporting Cast: Maui Taylor, Shido Roxas, Princess Aliyah, Bryce Eusebio, Jim Pebanco, Chloe Redondo, Mark Saruray
| 290 | "Secrets (Part 1)" | Lexi Gonzales; Gil Cuerva | Jojo Nadela | Micaela Rodriguez | November 4, 2023 |
Supporting Cast: Jean Garcia, Jackie Lou Blanco, Analyn Barro, Ella Cristofani, Mike Lloren, Kyla Garcia, Anna Camille Naguit
| 291 | "Secrets (Part 2)" | Lexi Gonzales; Gil Cuerva | Jojo Nadela | Micaela Rodriguez | November 11, 2023 |
Supporting Cast: Jean Garcia, Jackie Lou Blanco, Jelai Andres, Analyn Barro, Ella Cristofani, Mike Lloren, Kyla Garcia, Anna Camille Naguit
| 292 | "Secrets (Part 3)" | Lexi Gonzales; Gil Cuerva | Jojo Nadela | Micaela Rodriguez | November 18, 2023 |
Supporting Cast: Jean Garcia, Jackie Lou Blanco, Jelai Andres, Analyn Barro, Ella Cristofani, Mike Lloren, Kyla Garcia, Anna Camille Naguit
| 293 | "Mine (Part 1)" | Angel Guardian; Jay Arcilla | Michael Cardoz | JP Lopez | November 25, 2023 |
Supporting Cast: Angela Alarcon, Carmi Martin, Lovely Rivero, Earl Ignacio, Divine Tetay, Paolo Paraiso, Brent Valdez, Therese Tiangco
| 294 | "Mine (Part 2)" | Angel Guardian; Jay Arcilla | Michael Cardoz | JP Lopez | December 2, 2023 |
Supporting Cast: Angela Alarcon, Carmi Martin, Lovely Rivero, Earl Ignacio, Divine Tetay, Paolo Paraiso, Brent Valdez, Therese Tiangco
| 295 | "Mine (Part 3)" | Angel Guardian; Jay Arcilla | Michael Cardoz | JP Lopez | December 9, 2023 |
Supporting Cast: Angela Alarcon, Carmi Martin, Lovely Rivero, Earl Ignacio, Divine Tetay, Paolo Paraiso, Brent Valdez, Therese Tiangco
| 296 | "Tampuhan (Part 1)" | Ashley Ortega; Kristoffer Martin | Jojo Nadela | Michaela Rodriguez | December 16, 2023 |
Supporting Cast: Amy Austria, Ashley Rivera, Nikki Co, Jennifer Maravilla, Lienel Navidad, Althea Cuestas, MJ Ordillano
| 297 | "Tampuhan (Part 2)" | Ashley Ortega; Kristoffer Martin | Jojo Nadela | Michaela Rodriguez | December 23, 2023 |
Supporting Cast: Amy Austria, Ashley Rivera, Nikki Co, Jennifer Maravilla, Lienel Navidad, Althea Cuestas, MJ Ordillano
| 298 | "My Golden Love" | Irma Adlawan; Marco Alcaraz | Monti Parungao | Juan Gabriel Lopez | December 30, 2023 |
Supporting Cast: Althea Ablan, Analyn Barro, Jess Mendoza, Elle Ramirez, Raquel Pareño, Marc Daniel Bernardo, Ida Pomarejos Note: Replay story on April 15, 22 & 29, 2023.

=== 2024 ===
| No. | Title | Main cast | Directed by | Written by | Original release date |
|---|---|---|---|---|---|
| 299 | "Pinaasa (Part 1)" | Ina Feleo | Michael Christian Cardoz | JP Lopez | January 6, 2024 |
Supporting Cast: Joross Gamboa, Sophie Albert, Arny Ross, Divine Aucina, Gigi Locsin, Leandro Baldemor, Kaloy Tingcungco, Berniecular, Andrew Zobel
| 300 | "Pinaasa (Part 2)" | Ina Feleo | Michael Christian Cardoz | JP Lopez | January 13, 2024 |
Supporting Cast: Joross Gamboa, Sophie Albert, Arny Ross, Divine Aucina, Gigi Locsin, Leandro Baldemor, Kaloy Tingcungco, Berniecular, Andrew Zobel
| 301 | "Pinaasa (Part 3)" | Ina Feleo | Michael Christian Cardoz | JP Lopez | January 20, 2024 |
Supporting Cast: Joross Gamboa, Sophie Albert, Arny Ross, Divine Aucina, Gigi Locsin, Leandro Baldemor, Kaloy Tingcungco, Berniecular, Andrew Zobel
| 302 | "Jackpot (Part 1)" | Sheryl Cruz; Shayne Sava | Jojo Nadela | Micaela Rodriguez | January 27, 2024 |
Supporting Cast: Neil Ryan Sese, Ariella Arida, Rolando Inocencio, Yvette Sanchez, Pepita Curtis, Matthew Uy, Miss Deliciousness
| 303 | "Jackpot (Part 2)" | Sheryl Cruz; Shayne Sava | Jojo Nadela | Micaela Rodriguez | February 3, 2024 |
Supporting Cast: Neil Ryan Sese, Ariella Arida, Rolando Inocencio, Yvette Sanchez, Pepita Curtis, Matthew Uy, Miss Deliciousness
| 304 | "Jackpot (Part 3)" | Sheryl Cruz; Shayne Sava | Jojo Nadela | Micaela Rodriguez | February 10, 2024 |
Supporting Cast: Neil Ryan Sese, Ariella Arida, Rolando Inocencio, Yvette Sanchez, Pepita Curtis, Matthew Uy, Miss Deliciousness
| 305 | "Komisyon (Part 1)" | Nadine Samonte; Rob Gomez | Michael Christian Cardoz | JP Lopez | February 17, 2024 |
Supporting Cast: Mike Tan, Vaness del Moral, Euwenn Mikaell, Tart Carlos, Andrew Gan
| 306 | "Komisyon (Part 2)" | Nadine Samonte; Rob Gomez | Michael Christian Cardoz | JP Lopez | February 24, 2024 |
Supporting Cast: Mike Tan, Vaness del Moral, Euwenn Mikaell, Tart Carlos, Andrew Gan
| 307 | "Komisyon (Part 3)" | Nadine Samonte; Rob Gomez | Michael Christian Cardoz | JP Lopez | March 2, 2024 |
Supporting Cast: Mike Tan, Vaness del Moral, Euwenn Mikaell, Tart Carlos, Andrew Gan
| 308 | "Pamilya (Part 1)" | Royce Cabrera; Pauline Mendoza | Jojo Nadela | Micaela Rodriguez | March 9, 2024 |
Supporting Cast: Katya Santos, Andrea del Rosario, Trixie Fabricante, Kate Yalung, Luis Hontiveros, Crystal Paras, Rosemarie Sarita
| 309 | "Pamilya (Part 2)" | Royce Cabrera; Pauline Mendoza | Jojo Nadela | Micaela Rodriguez | March 16, 2024 |
Supporting Cast: Katya Santos, Andrea del Rosario, Trixie Fabricante, Kate Yalung, Luis Hontiveros, Crystal Paras, Rosemarie Sarita
| 310 | "Pamilya (Part 3)" | Royce Cabrera; Pauline Mendoza | Jojo Nadela | Michaela Rodriguez | March 23, 2024 |
Supporting Cast: Katya Santos, Andrea del Rosario, Trixie Fabricante, Luis Hontiveros, Crystal Paras, Kate Yalung, Rosemarie Sarita
| 311 | "Sister's Keeper (Part 1)" | Arra San Agustin; Yasser Marta; Jenzel Angeles | Michael Christian Cardoz | JP Lopez | April 6, 2024 |
Supporting Cast: Bernadette Allyson, Donna Cariaga, Cora Buenaventura
| 312 | "Sister's Keeper (Part 2)" | Arra San Agustin; Yasser Marta; Jenzel Angeles | Michael Christian Cardoz | JP Lopez | April 13, 2024 |
Supporting Cast: Bernadette Allyson, Donna Cariaga, Cora Buenaventura
| 313 | "Sister's Keeper (Part 3)" | Arra San Agustin; Yasser Marta; Jenzel Angeles | Michael Christian Cardoz | JP Lopez | April 20, 2024 |
Supporting Cast: Bernadette Allyson, Donna Cariaga, Cora Buenaventura
| 314 | "Teen Mama (Part 1)" | Elijah Alejo | Jojo Nadela | Micaela Rodriguez | April 27, 2024 |
Supporting Cast: Bianca Manalo, Luke Conde, Bruce Roeland, Hailey Mendes, Sheila Marie Rodriguez, Eya Borja, Mark Oliveros, Atasha Eve Franco
| 315 | "Teen Mama (Part 2)" | Elijah Alejo | Jojo Nadela | Micaela Rodriguez | May 4, 2024 |
Supporting Cast: Bianca Manalo, Luke Conde, Bruce Roeland, Hailey Mendes, Sheila Marie Rodriguez, Eya Borja, Mark Oliveros, Atasha Eve Franco
| 316 | "Teen Mama (Part 3)" | Elijah Alejo | Jojo Nadela | Micaela Rodriguez | May 11, 2024 |
Supporting Cast: Bianca Manalo, Luke Conde, Bruce Roeland, Hailey Mendes, Sheila Marie Rodriguez, Eya Borja, Mark Oliveros, Atasha Eve Franco
| 317 | "Due Date (Part 1)" | Rita Avila; Ashley Ortega | Michael Christian Cardoz | Mario Banzon | May 18, 2024 |
Supporting Cast: Dave Bornea, Jenine Desiderio, Shanelle Agustin, Jamir Zabarte, Via Antonio, Vince Crisostomo
| 318 | "Due Date (Part 2)" | Rita Avila; Ashley Ortega | Michael Christian Cardoz | Mario Banzon | May 25, 2024 |
Supporting Cast: Dave Bornea, Jenine Desiderio, Shanelle Agustin, Jamir Zabarte, Via Antonio, Vince Crisostomo
| 319 | "Due Date (Part 3)" | Rita Avila; Ashley Ortega | Michael Christian Cardoz | Mario Banzon | June 1, 2024 |
Supporting Cast: Dave Bornea, Jenine Desiderio, Shanelle Agustin, Jamir Zabarte, Via Antonio, Vince Crisostomo
| 320 | "Rom and Julie (Part 1)" | Lianne Valentin; Kristoffer Martin | King Mark Baco | JP Lopez | June 8, 2024 |
Supporting Cast: Rere Madrid, Kimson Tan, Madeleine Nicolas, Jan Marini, Marlon Mance
| 321 | "Rom and Julie (Part 2)" | Lianne Valentin; Kristoffer Martin | King Mark Baco | JP Lopez | June 15, 2024 |
Supporting Cast: Rere Madrid, Kimson Tan, Madeleine Nicolas, Jan Marini, Marlon Mance
| 322 | "Rom and Julie (Part 3)" | Lianne Valentin; Kristoffer Martin | King Mark Baco | JP Lopez | June 22, 2024 |
Supporting Cast: Rere Madrid, Kimson Tan, Madeleine Nicolas, Jan Marini, Marlon Mance
| 323 | "Akin ang Anak Ko"; Kuwait | Katrina Halili | Michael Christian Cardoz | Troy Espiritu | June 29, 2024 |
Supporting Cast: Dina Bonnevie, Lloyd Samartino, Neil Ryan Sese, Jade Lopez Note: Replay story on July 13 & 20, 2019.
| 324 | "Masked Dancer (Part 1)" | Crystal Paras; Rochelle Pangilinan | Jojo Nadela | Micaela Rodriguez | July 6, 2024 |
Supporting Cast: Radson Flores, Joaquin Manansala, Tanya Gomez, Kate Yalung, Chichi dela Cruz, Yesh Burce
| 325 | "Masked Dancer (Part 2)" | Crystal Paras; Rochelle Pangilinan | Jojo Nadela | Micaela Rodriguez | July 13, 2024 |
Supporting Cast: Radson Flores, Joaquin Manansala, Tanya Gomez, Kate Yalung, Chichi dela Cruz, Yesh Burce
| 326 | "Masked Dancer (Part 3)" | Crystal Paras; Rochelle Pangilinan | Jojo Nadela | Micaela Rodriguez | July 20, 2024 |
Supporting Cast: Radson Flores, Joaquin Manansala, Tanya Gomez, Kate Yalung, Chichi dela Cruz, Yesh Burce
| 327 | "The Sisters" | Mikee Quintos; Klea Pineda; Kimson Tan | Rommel Penesa | Juan Gabriel Lopez | July 27, 2024 |
Supporting Cast: Andrea del Rosario, Joshua Zamora, Via Veloso, Momshie Odille, Jayjay Jonson Note: Replay story on July 15, 22 & 29, 2023.
| 328 | "Eskapo (Part 1)" | Rabiya Mateo; Prince Clemente | Michael Christian Cardoz | JP Lopez | August 3, 2024 |
Supporting Cast: Teresa Loyzaga, Lara Morena, Mike Lloren, Mark Dionisio, Fela Austin
| 329 | "Eskapo (Part 2)" | Rabiya Mateo; Prince Clemente | Michael Christian Cardoz | JP Lopez | August 10, 2024 |
Supporting Cast: Teresa Loyzaga, Lara Morena, Mike Lloren, Mark Dionisio, Jet Rai, Seb Pajarillo
| 330 | "Eskapo (Part 3)" | Rabiya Mateo; Prince Clemente | Michael Christian Cardoz | JP Lopez | August 17, 2024 |
Supporting Cast: Teresa Loyzaga, Lara Morena, Mike Lloren, Jet Rai, Seb Pajarillo
| 331 | "Meant for You (Part 1)" | Winwyn Marquez; Rob Gomez | Jojo Nadela | Micaela Rodriguez | August 24, 2024 |
Supporting Cast: Marina Benipayo, Angel Leighton, Lienel Navidad, Lala Vinzon
| 332 | "Meant for You (Part 2)" | Winwyn Marquez; Rob Gomez | Jojo Nadela | Micaela Rodriguez | August 31, 2024 |
Supporting Cast: Marina Benipayo, Angel Leighton, Lienel Navidad, Lala Vinzon
| 333 | "Meant for You (Part 3)" | Winwyn Marquez; Rob Gomez | Jojo Nadela | Micaela Rodriguez | September 7, 2024 |
Supporting Cast: Marina Benipayo, Angel Leighton, Lienel Navidad, Lala Vinzon
| 334 | "Sugar Daddy (Part 1)" | Ara Mina; Manuel Chua | King Mark Baco | Mario Banzon | September 14, 2024 |
Supporting Cast: Carla Martinez, Jen Rosendahl, Angelica Jones, Jenzel Angeles, Hannah Arguelles, Jin Macapagal
| 335 | "Sugar Daddy (Part 2)" | Ara Mina; Manuel Chua | King Mark Baco | Mario Banzon | September 21, 2024 |
Supporting Cast: Carla Martinez, Jen Rosendahl, Angelica Jones, Jenzel Angeles, Hannah Arguelles, Jin Macapagal
| 336 | "Sugar Daddy (Part 3)" | Ara Mina; Manuel Chua | King Mark Baco | Mario Banzon | September 28, 2024 |
Supporting Cast: Carla Martinez, Jen Rosendahl, Angelica Jones, Jenzel Angeles, Hannah Arguelles, Jin Macapagal
| 337 | "Sino si Alice? (Part 1)" | Herlene Budol; Jon Lucas | King Mark Baco | JP Lopez | October 5, 2024 |
Supporting Cast: Thea Tolentino, Mon Confiado, Kim Perez, Elle Ramirez, Stephanie Sol, Gigi Locsin, Raquel Pareno
| 338 | "Sino si Alice? (Part 2)" | Herlene Budol; Jon Lucas | King Mark Baco | JP Lopez | October 12, 2024 |
Supporting Cast: Thea Tolentino, Mon Confiado, Kim Perez, Elle Ramirez, Stephanie Sol, Gigi Locsin, Raquel Pareno
| 337 | "Sino si Alice? (Part 3)" | Herlene Budol; Jon Lucas | King Mark Baco | JP Lopez | October 19, 2024 |
Supporting Cast: Thea Tolentino, Mon Confiado, Kim Perez, Elle Ramirez, Stephanie Sol, Gigi Locsin, Raquel Pareno
| 338 | "Lucky in Love (Part 1)" | Buboy Villar; Lexi Gonzales | Michael Christian Cardoz | Micaela Rodriguez | October 26, 2024 |
Supporting Cast: Chai Fonacier, Sue Prado, Soliman Cruz, Sheila Marie Rodriguez, Pamela Kaye, Mariel Pamintuan, Vince Maristela, Andrew Gan
| 339 | "Lucky in Love (Part 2)" | Buboy Villar; Lexi Gonzales | Michael Christian Cardoz | Micaela Rodriguez | November 2, 2024 |
Supporting Cast: Chai Fonacier, Sue Prado, Soliman Cruz, Sheila Marie Rodriguez, Pamela Kaye, Mariel Pamintuan, Vince Maristela, Andrew Gan
| 340 | "Lucky in Love (Part 3)" | Buboy Villar; Lexi Gonzales | Michael Christian Cardoz | Micaela Rodriguez | November 9, 2024 |
Supporting Cast: Chai Fonacier, Sue Prado, Soliman Cruz, Sheila Marie Rodriguez, Pamela Kaye, Mariel Pamintuan, Vince Maristela, Andrew Gan
| 341 | "Ma'am" | Max Collins; Yasser Marta | Rommel Penesa | Rusty Guarin | November 16, 2024 |
Supporting Cast: Liezel Lopez, Lovely Rivero, Sammantha Lopez, Anjay Anson, Ced Torrecarion, Chris Leonardo, Lady Gagita Note: Replay story on November 19, 26 & December 3, 2022.
| 342 | "Soldier's Wife (Part 1)" | Andrea Torres; Victor Silayan | Jojo Nadela | JP Lopez | November 23, 2024 |
Supporting Cast: Shamaine Buencamino, Simon Ibarra, Aidan Veneracion
| 343 | "Soldier's Wife (Part 2)" | Andrea Torres; Victor Silayan | Jojo Nadela | JP Lopez | November 30, 2024 |
Supporting Cast: Shamaine Buencamino, Simon Ibarra, Aidan Veneracion
| 344 | "Soldier's Wife (Part 3)" | Andrea Torres; Victor Silayan | Jojo Nadela | JP Lopez | December 7, 2024 |
Supporting Cast: Shamaine Buencamino, Simon Ibarra, Aidan Veneracion
| 345 | "Akin ang Bukas" | Kris Bernal; Boom Labrusca | Jojo Nadela; Rommel Penesa | Troy Espiritu | December 14, 2024 |
Supporting Cast: Shamaine Buencamino, Maui Taylor, Lara Morena, Rolando Innocencio Note: Replay story on October 29, November 5, and November 12, 2022.
| 344 | "Family Secrets (Part 1)" | Jennica Garcia; Therese Malvar | Jojo Nadela | Micaela Rodriguez | December 21, 2024 |
Supporting Cast: Bryce Eusebio, Lucho Ayala, Sebreenika Santos, Isay Alvarez
| 345 | "Family Secrets (Part 2)" | Jennica Garcia; Therese Malvar | Jojo Nadela | Micaela Rodriguez | December 28, 2024 |
Supporting Cast: Bryce Eusebio, Lucho Ayala, Sebreenika Santos, Isay Alvarez

=== 2025 ===
| No. | Title | Main cast | Directed by | Written by | Original release date |
|---|---|---|---|---|---|
| 346 | "Love Thy Neighbor (Part 1)" | Aleck Bovick; Rafael Rosell | Michael Christian Cardoz | Mario Banzon | January 4, 2025 |
Supporting Cast: Althea Ablan, Jade Lopez, Paolo Paraiso, Caprice Cayetano
| 347 | "Love Thy Neighbor (Part 2)" | Aleck Bovick; Rafael Rosell | Michael Christian Cardoz | Mario Banzon | January 11, 2025 |
Supporting Cast: Althea Ablan, Jade Lopez, Paolo Paraiso, Caprice Cayetano
| 348 | "Love Thy Neighbor (Part 3)" | Aleck Bovick; Rafael Rosell | Michael Christian Cardoz | Mario Banzon | January 18, 2025 |
Supporting Cast: Althea Ablan, Jade Lopez, Paolo Paraiso, Caprice Cayetano
| 349 | "Old Maid (Part 1)" | Karen delos Reyes | Michael Christian Cardoz | Micaela Rodriguez | January 25, 2025 |
Supporting Cast: Janice Jurado, Arnold Reyes, Kimson Tan, Mia Pangyarihan, Lienel Navidad, Jet Rai, Lady Gagita
| 350 | "Old Maid (Part 2)" | Karen delos Reyes | Michael Christian Cardoz | Micaela Rodriguez | February 1, 2025 |
Supporting Cast: Janice Jurado, Arnold Reyes, Kimson Tan, Mia Pangyarihan, Lienel Navidad, Jet Rai, Lady Gagita
| 351 | "Old Maid (Part 3)" | Karen delos Reyes | Michael Christian Cardoz | Micaela Rodriguez | February 8, 2025 |
Supporting Cast: Janice Jurado, Arnold Reyes, Kimson Tan, Mia Pangyarihan, Lienel Navidad, Jet Rai, Lady Gagita
| 352 | "Buongiorno Pag-ibig (Part 1)" | Allen Dizon; Valerie Concepcion | Jojo Nadela | JP Lopez | February 15, 2025 |
Supporting Cast: Sandro Muhlach, Shanelle Agustin, Tart Carlos, Rosemarie Sarita
| 353 | "Buongiorno Pag-ibig (Part 2)" | Allen Dizon; Valerie Concepcion | Jojo Nadela | JP Lopez | February 22, 2025 |
Supporting Cast: Sandro Muhlach, Shanelle Agustin, Tart Carlos, Rosemarie Sarita
| 354 | "Buongiorno Pag-ibig (Part 3)" | Allen Dizon; Valerie Concepcion | Jojo Nadela | JP Lopez | March 1, 2025 |
Supporting Cast: Sandro Muhlach, Shanelle Agustin, Tart Carlos, Rosemarie Sarita
| 355 | "Abo ng Kahapon (Part 1)" | Kris Bernal; Rob Gomez | Michael Christian Cardoz | JP Lopez | March 8, 2025 |
Supporting Cast: Nathan Lopez, Raquel Pareño, Princess Aliyah, Pamela Kaye
| 356 | "Abo ng Kahapon (Part 2)" | Kris Bernal; Rob Gomez | Michael Christian Cardoz | JP Lopez | March 15, 2025 |
Supporting Cast: Nathan Lopez, Raquel Pareño, Princess Aliyah, Pamela Kaye
| 357 | "Abo ng Kahapon (Part 3)" | Kris Bernal; Rob Gomez | Michael Christian Cardoz | JP Lopez | March 22, 2025 |
Supporting Cast: Nathan Lopez, Raquel Pareño, Princess Aliyah, Pamela Kaye
| 358 | "Fake Love (Part 1)" | Amy Austria | Jojo Nadela | Micaela Rodriguez | March 29, 2025 |
Supporting Cast: Larkin Castor, Kate Yalung, Laziz Rustamov, Damon Matthew Tapp
| 359 | "Fake Love (Part 2)" | Amy Austria | Jojo Nadela | Micaela Rodriguez | April 5, 2025 |
Supporting Cast: Larkin Castor, Kate Yalung, Laziz Rustamov, Damon Matthew Tapp
| 360 | "Fake Love (Part 3)" | Amy Austria | Jojo Nadela | Micaela Rodriguez | April 12, 2025 |
Supporting Cast: Larkin Castor, Kate Yalung, Laziz Rustamov, Damon Matthew Tapp
| 361 | "Mother's Love (Part 1)" | Sheryl Cruz | Michael Christian Cardoz | JP Lopez | April 26, 2025 |
Supporting Cast: Richard Quan, Dom Pangilinan, Gigi Locsin, Jeremy Sabido, Lance Raymundo
| 362 | "Mother's Love (Part 2)" | Sheryl Cruz | Michael Christian Cardoz | JP Lopez | May 3, 2025 |
Supporting Cast: Richard Quan, Dom Pangilinan, Gigi Locsin, Jeremy Sabido, Lance Raymundo
| 363 | "Mother's Love (Part 3)" | Sheryl Cruz | Michael Christian Cardoz | JP Lopez | May 10, 2025 |
Supporting Cast: Richard Quan, Dom Pangilinan, Gigi Locsin, Jeremy Sabido, Lance Raymundo
| 364 | "Ang Nanay Kong DH (Part 1)" | Lotlot de Leon | Jojo Nadela | Mario Banzon | May 24, 2025 |
Supporting Cast: Meg Imperial, Leandro Baldemor, Lara Morena, Jenine Desiderio, Andrew Gan
| 365 | "Ang Nanay Kong DH (Part 2)" | Lotlot de Leon | Jojo Nadela | Mario Banzon | May 31, 2025 |
Supporting Cast: Meg Imperial, Leandro Baldemor, Lara Morena, Jenine Desiderio, Andrew Gan
| 366 | "Ang Nanay Kong DH (Part 3)" | Lotlot de Leon | Jojo Nadela | Mario Banzon | June 7, 2025 |
Supporting Cast: Meg Imperial, Leandro Baldemor, Lara Morena, Jenine Desiderio, Andrew Gan
| 367 | "Family Affairs (Part 1)" | Analyn Barro; Maureen Larrazabal | Michael Christian Cardoz | JP Lopez | June 14, 2025 |
Supporting Cast: Kim Perez, Simon Ibarra, Dexter Doria, Karenina Haniel, Andrew Zobel
| 368 | "Family Affairs (Part 2)" | Analyn Barro; Maureen Larrazabal | Michael Christian Cardoz | JP Lopez | June 21, 2025 |
Supporting Cast: Kim Perez, Simon Ibarra, Dexter Doria, Karenina Haniel, Andrew Zobel
| 369 | "Family Affairs (Part 3)" | Analyn Barro; Maureen Larrazabal | Michael Christian Cardoz | JP Lopez | June 28, 2025 |
Supporting Cast: Kim Perez, Simon Ibarra, Dexter Doria, Karenina Haniel, Andrew Zobel
| 370 | "Boss Yaya (Part 1)" | Jennica Garcia | Jojo Nadela | Micaela Rodriguez | July 5, 2025 |
Supporting Cast: Winwyn Marquez, Joaquin Manansala, Jay Ortega, Carla Martinez, Tanya Gomez, Gino Ilustre
| 371 | "Boss Yaya (Part 2)" | Jennica Garcia | Jojo Nadela | Micaela Rodriguez | July 12, 2025 |
Supporting Cast: Winwyn Marquez, Joaquin Manansala, Jay Ortega, Carla Martinez, Tanya Gomez, Gino Ilustre
| 372 | "Boss Yaya (Part 3)" | Jennica Garcia | Jojo Nadela | Micaela Rodriguez | July 19, 2025 |
Supporting Cast: Winwyn Marquez, Joaquin Manansala, Jay Ortega, Carla Martinez, Tanya Gomez, Gino Ilustre
| 373 | "Unwanted Child (Part 1)" | Mikee Quintos | Michael Christian Cardoz | Mario Banzon | July 26, 2025 |
Supporting Cast: Jon Lucas, Mike Agassi, Lovely Rivero, Raquel Pareño, Rubi Rubi
| 374 | "Unwanted Child (Part 2)" | Mikee Quintos | Michael Christian Cardoz | Mario Banzon | August 2, 2025 |
Supporting Cast: Jon Lucas, Mike Agassi, Lovely Rivero, Raquel Pareño, Rubi Rubi
| 375 | "Unwanted Child (Part 3)" | Mikee Quintos | Michael Christian Cardoz | Mario Banzon | August 9, 2025 |
Supporting Cast: Jon Lucas, Mike Agassi, Lovely Rivero, Raquel Pareño, Rubi Rubi
| 376 | "Banta ng Kahapon (Part 1)" | Cherry Pie Picache | Adolf Alix Jr. | Mario Banzon | August 23, 2025 |
Supporting Cast: Isay Alvarez, Althea Ablan, Mike Lloren, Antonette Garcia, Al Gatmaitan, Princess Aliyah
| 377 | "Banta ng Kahapon (Part 2)" | Cherry Pie Picache | Adolf Alix Jr. | Mario Banzon | August 30, 2025 |
Supporting Cast: Isay Alvarez, Althea Ablan, Mike Lloren, Antonette Garcia, Al Gatmaitan, Princess Aliyah
| 378 | "Banta ng Kahapon (Part 3)" | Cherry Pie Picache | Adolf Alix Jr. | Mario Banzon | September 6, 2025 |
Supporting Cast: Isay Alvarez, Althea Ablan, Mike Lloren, Antonette Garcia, Al Gatmaitan, Princess Aliyah
| 379 | "Grasya (Part 1)" | Shayne Sava; Irma Adlawan | King Mark Baco | Micaela Rodriguez | September 13, 2025 |
Supporting Cast: Carlo San Juan, Mia Pangyarihan, Mark Dionisio, Kate Yalung, Yesh Burce, Lorraine Wong, Atasha Eve Franco, Kelle Gleo
| 380 | "Grasya (Part 2)" | Shayne Sava; Irma Adlawan | King Mark Baco | Micaela Rodriguez | September 20, 2025 |
Supporting Cast: Carlo San Juan, Mia Pangyarihan, Mark Dionisio, Kate Yalung, Yesh Burce, Lorraine Wong, Atasha Eve Franco, Kelle Gleo
| 381 | "Grasya (Part 3)" | Shayne Sava; Irma Adlawan | King Mark Baco | Micaela Rodriguez | September 27, 2025 |
Supporting Cast: Carlo San Juan, Mia Pangyarihan, Mark Dionisio, Kate Yalung, Yesh Burce, Lorraine Wong, Atasha Eve Franco, Kelle Gleo
| 382 | "Walang Kawala (Part 1)" | Shaira Diaz; Thea Tolentino | Jojo Nadela | JP Lopez | October 4, 2025 |
Supporting Cast: Yasser Marta, Bing Pimentel, Almira Muhlach, Arny Ross, Marithez Samson
| 383 | "Walang Kawala (Part 2)" | Shaira Diaz; Thea Tolentino | Jojo Nadela | JP Lopez | October 11, 2025 |
Supporting Cast: Yasser Marta, Bing Pimentel, Almira Muhlach, Arny Ross, Marithez Samson
| 384 | "Walang Kawala (Part 3)" | Shaira Diaz; Thea Tolentino | Jojo Nadela | JP Lopez | October 18, 2025 |
Supporting Cast: Yasser Marta, Bing Pimentel, Almira Muhlach, Arny Ross, Marithez Samson
| 385 | "Ma'am Digna (Part 1)" | Desiree del Valle | Kiko Meily | Micaela Rodriguez | October 25, 2025 |
Supporting Cast: Arra San Agustin, Therese Malvar, Aidan Veneracion, Shermaine Santiago, Nikki Co, Shanelle Agustin, Gigi Locsin, Janine Chua
| 386 | "Ma'am Digna (Part 2)" | Desiree del Valle | Kiko Meily | Micaela Rodriguez | November 1, 2025 |
Supporting Cast: Arra San Agustin, Therese Malvar, Aidan Veneracion, Shermaine Santiago, Nikki Co, Shanelle Agustin, Gigi Locsin, Janine Chua
| 387 | "Ma'am Digna (Part 3)" | Desiree del Valle | Kiko Meily | Micaela Rodriguez | November 8, 2025 |
Supporting Cast: Arra San Agustin, Therese Malvar, Aidan Veneracion, Shermaine Santiago, Nikki Co, Shanelle Agustin, Gigi Locsin, Janine Chua
| 388 | "Meant for You" | Winwyn Marquez; Rob Gomez | Jojo Nadela | Micaela Rodriguez | November 15, 2025 |
Supporting Cast: Marina Benipayo, Angel Leighton, Lienel Navidad, Lala Vinzon Note: Replay story on August 24, 31 & September 7, 2024.
| 389 | "Kabayaran" | Bianca Umali; Rita Daniela; Jak Roberto | Rember Gelera | Reign Andre Loleng | November 22, 2025 |
Supporting Cast: Almira Muhlach, Jeric Raval, Nico Locco, Bench Hipolito, Coleen Paz Note: Replay story on November 27 & December 4, 2021.
| 388 | "Pangarap na Pamilya (Part 1)" | Aubrey Miles; Joem Bascon | King Mark Baco | Mario Banzon | November 29, 2025 |
Supporting Cast: Robb Guinto, Cruzita Salcedo, Andrew Gan
| 389 | "Pangarap na Pamilya (Part 2)" | Aubrey Miles; Joem Bascon | King Mark Baco | Mario Banzon | December 6, 2025 |
Supporting Cast: Robb Guinto, Cruzita Salcedo, Andrew Gan
| 390 | "Pangarap na Pamilya (Part 3)" | Aubrey Miles; Joem Bascon | King Mark Baco | Mario Banzon | December 13, 2025 |
Supporting Cast: Robb Guinto, Cruzita Salcedo, Andrew Gan
| 391 | "Pag-uwi"; Ontario, Canada | Angelu de Leon; Bobby Andrews | King Mark Baco | Jerome Zamora | December 20, 2025 |
Supporting Cast: Marc Justine Alvarez, John Kenneth Giducos Note: Replay story on December 16, 2017.
| 392 | "Pamana"; Bahamas | Gardo Versoza | Michael Christian Cardoz | James Harvey Estrada | December 27, 2025 |
Supporting Cast: Maria Isabel Lopez, Jak Roberto, Paul Holmes, Therese Malvar Note: Replay story on December 9, 2017.

=== 2026 ===
| No. | Title | Main cast | Directed by | Written by | Original release date |
|---|---|---|---|---|---|
| 393 | "Perlas (Part 1)" | Wendell Ramos; Althea Ablan | Michael Christian Cardoz | Mario Banzon | January 3, 2026 |
Supporting Cast: Aleck Bovick, Royce Cabrera, Zyren Dela Cruz, Larkin Castor
| 394 | "Perlas (Part 2)" | Wendell Ramos; Althea Ablan | Michael Christian Cardoz | Mario Banzon | January 10, 2026 |
Supporting Cast: Aleck Bovick, Royce Cabrera, Zyren Dela Cruz, Larkin Castor
| 395 | "Perlas (Part 3)" | Wendell Ramos; Althea Ablan | Michael Christian Cardoz | Mario Banzon | January 17, 2026 |
Supporting Cast: Aleck Bovick, Royce Cabrera, Zyren Dela Cruz, Larkin Castor
| 396 | "Tunay na Misis Solis (Part 1)" | Jennica Garcia; Victor Silayan; Elle Ramirez | Jojo Nadela | JP Lopez | January 24, 2026 |
Supporting Cast: Maricar de Mesa, Rubi Rubi, Raquel Pareno, Sebreenika Santos
| 397 | "Tunay na Misis Solis (Part 2)" | Jennica Garcia; Victor Silayan; Elle Ramirez | Jojo Nadela | JP Lopez | January 31, 2026 |
Supporting Cast: Maricar de Mesa, Rubi Rubi, Raquel Pareno, Sebreenika Santos
| 398 | "Tunay na Misis Solis (Part 3)" | Jennica Garcia; Victor Silayan; Elle Ramirez | Jojo Nadela | JP Lopez | February 7, 2026 |
Supporting Cast: Maricar de Mesa, Rubi Rubi, Raquel Pareno, Sebreenika Santos
| 399 | "Atty. Sekyu (Part 1)" | Lexi Gonzales | Kiko Meily | Mica Rodriguez | February 14, 2026 |
Supporting Cast: Marissa Delgado, Arlene Muhlach, Lianne Valentin, Jay Arcilla, Melissa Mendez, Mike Lloren, Zonia Mejia
| 400 | "Atty. Sekyu (Part 2)" | Lexi Gonzales | Kiko Meily | Mica Rodriguez | February 21, 2026 |
Supporting Cast: Marissa Delgado, Arlene Muhlach, Lianne Valentin, Jay Arcilla, Melissa Mendez, Mike Lloren, Zonia Mejia
| 401 | "Atty. Sekyu (Part 3)" | Lexi Gonzales | Kiko Meily | Mica Rodriguez | February 28, 2026 |
Supporting Cast: Marissa Delgado, Arlene Muhlach, Lianne Valentin, Jay Arcilla, Melissa Mendez, Mike Lloren, Zonia Mejia
| 402 | "My Love is Not for Sale (Part 1)" | Andrea Torres; Jeric Gonzales | Michael Christian Cardoz | Mario Banzon | March 14, 2026 |
Supporting Cast: Yesh Burce, Tanya Gomez, Bing Pimentel
| 403 | "My Love is Not for Sale (Part 2)" | Andrea Torres; Jeric Gonzales | Michael Christian Cardoz | Mario Banzon | March 21, 2026 |
Supporting Cast: Yesh Burce, Tanya Gomez, Bing Pimentel
| 404 | "My Love is Not for Sale (Part 3)" | Andrea Torres; Jeric Gonzales | Michael Christian Cardoz | Mario Banzon | March 28, 2026 |
Supporting Cast: Yesh Burce, Tanya Gomez, Bing Pimentel
| 405 | "Contract Lover (Part 1)" | Analyn Barro; Gil Cuerva | Jojo Nadela | JP Lopez | April 11, 2026 |
Supporting Cast: Liezel Lopez, Elora Españo, Anne Garcia, Brent Valdez
| 406 | "Contract Lover (Part 2)" | Analyn Barro; Gil Cuerva | Jojo Nadela | JP Lopez | April 18, 2026 |
Supporting Cast: Liezel Lopez, Elora Españo, Anne Garcia, Brent Valdez
| 407 | "Contract Lover (Part 3)" | Analyn Barro; Gil Cuerva | Jojo Nadela | JP Lopez | April 25, 2026 |
Supporting Cast: Liezel Lopez, Elora Españo, Anne Garcia, Brent Valdez
| 408 | "The Real Daughter (Part 1)" | Winwyn Marquez | King Mark Baco | Mica Rodriguez | May 9, 2026 |
Supporting Cast: Rob Gomez, Thea Tolentino, Kim Perez, Moi Bien, Lama Wahood, Ellie Gabriel Cruz
| 409 | "The Real Daughter (Part 2)" | Winwyn Marquez | King Mark Baco | Mica Rodriguez | May 16, 2026 |
Supporting Cast: Rob Gomez, Thea Tolentino, Kim Perez, Moi Bien, Lama Wahood, Ellie Gabriel Cruz
| 410 | "The Real Daughter (Part 3)" | Winwyn Marquez | King Mark Baco | Mica Rodriguez | May 23, 2026 |
Supporting Cast: Eunice Lagusad, Jennie Gabriel, Jayferson Rivera Ahaja
| 411 | "My Husband's Wedding (Part 1)" | Glaiza de Castro; Juancho Triviño; Vaness del Moral | Adolfo Alix Jr. | Bradley Jason Pantajo | June 6, 2026 |
Supporting Cast: Eunice Lagusad, Jennie Gabriel, Jayferson Rivera Ahaja
| 412 | "My Husband's Wedding (Part 2)" | Glaiza de Castro; Juancho Triviño; Vaness del Moral | Adolfo Alix Jr. | Bradley Jason Pantajo | June 13, 2026 |
Supporting Cast: Eunice Lagusad, Jennie Gabriel, Jayferson Rivera Ahaja
| 413 | "My Husband's Wedding (Part 3)" | Glaiza de Castro; Juancho Triviño; Vaness del Moral | Adolfo Alix Jr. | Bradley Jason Pantajo | June 20, 2026 |
Supporting Cast: Eunice Lagusad, Jennie Gabriel, Jayferson Rivera Ahaja
| 414 | "Dalawang Mukha ng Pag-Ibig (Part 1)" | Ashley Ortega | Kiko Meily | Mario Banzon | June 27, 2026 |
Supporting Cast: Andre Paras, Royce Cabrera, Robb Guinto, Che Cosio
| 415 | "Dalawang Mukha ng Pag-Ibig (Part 2)" | Ashley Ortega | Kiko Meily | Mario Banzon | July 4, 2026 |
Supporting Cast: Andre Paras, Royce Cabrera, Robb Guinto, Che Cosio
| 416 | "Dalawang Mukha ng Pag-Ibig (Part 3)" | Ashley Ortega | Kiko Meily | Mario Banzon | July 11, 2026 |
Supporting Cast: Andre Paras, Royce Cabrera, Robb Guinto, Che Cosio
| 417 | "Akin ang Lahat (Part 1)" | Katrina Halili | Michael Christian Cardoz | Bradley Jason Pantajo | July 18, 2026 |
Supporting Cast: Arnold Reyes, Sheree Bautista, Mel Kimura, Zoe Anthonia Viterbo
| 418 | "Akin ang Lahat (Part 2)" | Katrina Halili | Michael Christian Cardoz | Bradley Jason Pantajo | July 25, 2026 |
Supporting Cast: Arnold Reyes, Sheree Bautista, Mel Kimura, Zoe Anthonia Viterbo
| 419 | "Finding Hope (Part 1)" | Kris Bernal | Jojo Nadela | Bradley Jason Pantajo; Micaela Rodriguez | August 8, 2026 |
Supporting Cast: Paolo Paraiso, Maricar de Mesa, Ashley Sarmiento, Lui Manansala, Archie Adamos
| 420 | "Finding Hope (Part 2)" | Kris Bernal | Jojo Nadela | Bradley Jason Pantajo; Micaela Rodriguez | August 15, 2026 |
Supporting Cast: Paolo Paraiso, Maricar de Mesa, Ashley Sarmiento, Lui Manansala, Archie Adamos
| 421 | "Scandal ni Misis (Part 1)" | Beauty Gonzalez; Dion Ignacio | King Mark Baco | Bradley Jason Pantajo; Micaela Rodriguez | August 22, 2026 |
Supporting Cast: Liezel Lopez, Aya Domingo
| 422 | "Scandal ni Misis (Part 2)" | Beauty Gonzalez; Dion Ignacio | King Mark Baco | Bradley Jason Pantajo; Micaela Rodriguez | August 29, 2026 |
Supporting Cast: Liezel Lopez, Aya Domingo
| 423 | "Lihim na Anak (Part 1)" | Jennica Garcia | Kiko Meily | JP Lopez; Micaela Rodriguez | September 12, 2026 |
Supporting Cast: Yasser Marta, Roxie Smith, Glenda Garcia, Carla Martinez
| 424 | "Lihim na Anak (Part 2)" | Jennica Garcia | Kiko Meily | JP Lopez; Micaela Rodriguez | September 19, 2026 |
Supporting Cast: Yasser Marta, Roxie Smith, Glenda Garcia, Carla Martinez
| 425 | "Burado (Part 1)" | Rhian Ramos | Michael Christian Cardoz | Bradley Jason Pantajo | September 26, 2026 |
Supporting Cast: Edgar Allan Guzman, Meg Imperial, Angel Cadao, Andrew Gan
| 426 | "Burado (Part 2)" | Rhian Ramos | Michael Christian Cardoz | Bradley Jason Pantajo | October 3, 2026 |
Supporting Cast: Edgar Allan Guzman, Meg Imperial, Angel Cadao, Andrew Gan
| 427 | "Ang Manugang (Part 1)" | Katrina Halili | Jojo Nadela | Bradley Jason Pantajo; Micaela Rodriguez | October 10, 2026 |
Supporting Cast: Mike Tan, Jackie Lou Blanco, Faye Lorenzo, Bryan Benedict, Atasha Eve Franco
| 428 | "Ang Manugang (Part 2)" | Katrina Halili | Jojo Nadela | Bradley Jason Pantajo; Micaela Rodriguez | October 17, 2026 |
Supporting Cast: Mike Tan, Jackie Lou Blanco, Faye Lorenzo, Bryan Benedict, Atasha Eve Franco
| 429 | "The Return of My Dead Husband (Part 1)" | Diana Zubiri; Wendell Ramos | Kiko Meily | Bradley Jason Pantajo; Micaela Rodriguez | October 24, 2026 |
Supporting Cast: Mercedes Cabral, Rubi Rubi, Inah Evans, Quincy Ross, Antonio Pertodo III
| 430 | "The Return of My Dead Husband (Part 2)" | Diana Zubiri; Wendell Ramos | Kiko Meily | Bradley Jason Pantajo; Micaela Rodriguez | October 31, 2026 |
Supporting Cast: Mercedes Cabral, Rubi Rubi, Inah Evans, Quincy Ross, Antonio Pertodo III
