= Arny Ross =

Filipino actress and comedian

- Born: Arny Ross Ramos Roque; July 19, 1991 (age 35); Dasmariñas, Cavite, Philippines
- Education: De La Salle University-Dasmariñas
- Occupations: Actress, Model, Dancer, Comedian
- Years active: 2012–present
- Known for: FHMs 100 Sexiest Woman
- Spouse: Franklin "Frank" Banogon (m. 2021)
- Children: 1
- Relatives: Dominic Roque (cousin); Anthony Roque (cousin); Patricia Ann Roque (second cousin)
- Modeling information
- Height: 1.68 m (5 ft 6 in)
- Hair color: Black
- Eye color: Black
- Agency: GMA Artist Center (2012-present)
- Website: Arny Ross on Facebook

Arny Ross Roque-Banogon (born July 19, 1991), simply known as Arny Ross, is a Filipino actress, comedian, model, and dancer. She is known as one of the contestants of Protégé: The Battle For The Big Artista Break under Gina Alajar and later to Phillip Salvador. She represented Southern Luzon in that season.

During Protégé, Ross developed a love interest with Jeric Gonzales, who ended up as the Grand Winner of the show. She was eliminated from the competition before the announcement of the final 10 contestants.

Ross is also known for being a mainstay of Bubble Gang until 2022 and she was a member of its group "Bubble Shakers".

== Personal life ==
Ross was born in Dasmariñas, Cavite, to a Policewoman mother. When she studied at De La Salle University-Dasmariñas she became a great dancer, which became her stepping stone to fame. Before she joined Protégé, she participated in beauty pageants not only in her hometown, Dasmariñas and her Province, Cavite but also in Southern Luzon and National Pageants including Miss Teem Philippines and PRISAA, in which she eventually won. She also worked for Dasmariñas Rep. Elpidio Barzaga.

She is married to her longtime partner for 13 years, Frank Banogon on November 9, 2021, in Tagaytay. Ross gave birth to their first child named Jordan Franco on July 27, 2022.

== Career ==
She became the cover girl of FHM Philippines for May 2015, in which she joined forces with social media sweethearts Ann B. Mateo and Cyen Lazam as the FHM May 2015 Online Babes. According to an episode of 24 Oras, all Bubble Shakers would perform on the 100 Sexiest Party dubbed as FHM BroCon on July 11, 2015, at the SMX Convention Center (SM Mall of Asia) but their rankings in the said list allegedly led them to boycott the event.

== Filmography ==
=== Television ===
Year	Title	Role
2012	Protégé: The Battle For The Big Artista Break	Herself
2012–13	Party Pilipinas	Host / Performer
2013–15	Sunday All Stars	Host / Performer
2013	Bukod Kang Pinagpala	Bella Caravide
2013	Mundo Mo'y Akin	Ria
2013	Magpakailanman: Princess Pura Story	
2013–22	Bubble Gang	Herself / Various
2014–15	Hiram na Alaala	Rochelle
2015	MariMar	Amale Zamora / Fake Marimar / Bella
2015	Magpakailanman: Gandang Hindi Nakikita	Cindy
2015	Because of You	Lizzy
2015	Karelasyon: Boy Hipon	Becca
2015	Karelasyon: Face Value	Karen
2016	Hanggang Makita Kang Muli	Kate
2016	Karelasyon: Reyna	Joan
2016	Ismol Family	Beth
2016	Dangwa	Fiona
2016	A1 Ko Sa 'Yo	Emily
2016	Encantadia	Silvia Monteclaro
2016	Dear Uge: Paano Mapansin Ni Crush?	Leslie
2017	D' Originals	Precious
2017	Road Trip	Herself / Guest
2017	Alyas Robin Hood	Prisoner #2
2017– 24	Tadhana	Jackie / Lucy / Tess
2018–19	My Special Tatay	Monique Roque
2020	All-Out Sundays	Herself / Guest
2021	The Lost Recipe	Brie
2023	Abot-Kamay na Pangarap	Bea Almazan
2023	Pinoy Crime Stories	Sally

== Awards and recognitions ==
=== FHM 100 Sexiest Woman ===
Year	Award	Category	Result	Won by	Note
2016	FHM Philippines	100 Sexiest Woman	Rank # 38	Jessy Mendiola	
2015	FHM Philippines	100 Sexiest Woman	Rank # 26	Jennylyn Mercado	Appeared for May 2015 issue
