= Playtime (2024 film) =

2024 Philippine suspense thriller film

- Directed by: Mark A. Reyes
- Screenplay by: Noreen Capili; Dustin Celestino; Mark A. Reyes
- Story by: Mark A. Reyes
- Produced by: Nessa Valdellon; Jose Mari Abacan; Vincent Del Rosario III; Valerie Del Rosario; Veronique Del Rosario-Corpus
- Starring: Sanya Lopez; Coleen Garcia; Faye Lorenzo; Xian Lim
- Cinematography: Gary Gardoce
- Edited by: Tara Illenberger
- Music by: Von de Guzman
- Production companies: GMA Pictures; Viva Films
- Distributed by: GMA Pictures
- Release date: June 12, 2024
- Running time: 101 minutes
- Country: Philippines
- Language: Tagalog

Playtime is a 2024 Philippine suspense thriller film written and directed by Mark A. Reyes. Produced and distributed by GMA Pictures, in association with Viva Films, it stars Sanya Lopez, Coleen Garcia, Faye Lorenzo and Xian Lim. The film was released theatrically on June 12, 2024 in the Philippines.

== Premise ==
Three girls — Allyson, Veronica and Patricia awake in the middle of nowhere. They will soon later find out that each of them are participating in a deadly game.

== Cast ==
- Sanya Lopez as Allyson
- Coleen Garcia as Veronica
- Faye Lorenzo as Patricia
- Xian Lim as Lucas

Additional cast members include Bruce Roeland, Haley Dizon, Kim Perez, Lienel Navidad and Camille Patricia Guzman.

== Release ==
Playtime was released theatrically on June 12, 2024 in the Philippines.

== Reception ==
PEP.ph ’ called the film a "thrilling slasher film with a dash of humor."
