= Rubi Rubi =

Filipino actress and comedian (born 1966)

- Born: Ruby Esmaquel; January 3, 1966 (age 60)
- Education: Far Eastern University
- Occupations: Actress; comedian; entrepreneur
- Years active: 1997–present
- Agent: DMV Entertainment
- Partner: Marco Llonor (married)

Ruby Esmaquel (born January 3, 1966), known professionally as Rubi Rubi, is a Filipino actress, comedian, acting teacher and entrepreneur. Her first onscreen appearance was in the 2002 film, I Think I’m In Love, followed by her first teleserye series, Impostora (2007). With a career spanning two decades, she is recognized as one of the country's most prominent character actresses in film and television. She is best-known for her performance as "Manang Precious" in Dirty Linen (2023).

== Career ==
Before entering the show business, Rubi Rubi became a stand-up comedian in 1997 at the pioneering comedy bar in the country, Music Box. After signing up a five-year managerial contract under DMV Entertainment, she made the rounds of other comedy bars such as Library, 22nd Street Bar (where she became an exclusive performer four nights a week) and Basilica.

== Filmography ==
=== Film ===
| Year | Title | Role |
|---|---|---|
| 2002 | I Think I'm In Love | Cosmetic Girl 1 |
| 2006 | Bikini Open | |
| 2007 | Hide and Seek | Indeng |
| 2008 | Manay Po 2: Overload | Summer |
| 2009 | Villa Estrella | Suzy |
| 2009 | Pitik Bulag | Nena |
| 2010 | Ang Tanging Ina Mo: Last Na 'To | Doctor 3 |
| 2011 | Praybeyt Benjamin | Captain Tenille |
| 2012 | Sisterakas | Cara |
| 2013 | Bekikang: Ang Nanay Kong Beki | Lydia |
| 2013 | Girl, Boy, Bakla, Tomboy | Crazy Doctor |
| 2014 | The Gifted | Bully |
| 2014 | Moron 5.2: The Transformation | Doctor 3 |
| 2014 | The Amazing Praybeyt Benjamin | Captain Tenille |
| 2016 | I Love You To Death | Franca Bochelli |
| 2018 | My Fairy Tail Love Story | Nana Gurang |
| 2018 | Poon | Mimi |
| 2018 | Kuya Wes | Tita Beverly |
| 2018 | Nakalimutan Ko Nang Kalimutan Ka | Grieving Mother |
| 2018 | Everybody Loves Baby Wendy | Judge 2 |
| 2018 | Mary, Marry Me | Aunt Toyang |
| 2019 | Familia Blondina | Elvie |
| 2019 | Ang Taran Tanods: K'nang Buhay 'To! | |
| 2019 | And Ai, Thank You! | Tiya Marie |
| 2020 | Mang Kepweng: Ang Lihim ng Bandanang Itim | Tandang Bruha |
| 2020 | Suarez: The Healing Priest | Donor |
| 2023 | Lagaslas | Loleng |

=== Television ===
| Year | Title | Role |
|---|---|---|
| 2007 | Impostora | Miss Minchin |
| 2008 | Dyosa | Huling |
| 2008 | Obra | |
| 2010 | Kokey @ Ako | Fifi |
| 2011 | Magic Palayok | Yaya Rosa |
| 2011 | Mula sa Puso | Tindeng |
| 2011 | Glamorosa | Britney |
| 2013 | Bukas na Lang Kita Mamahalin | Lyda Bernal |
| 2015 | Mac & Chiz | Paning |
| 2015 | #ParangNormal Activity | Ms. Pating |
| 2016 | Princess in the Palace | Concha |
| 2016 | Calle Siete | Margie Silang |
| 2017 | Hanggang Saan | Pinky |
| 2018 | Ang Forever Ko'y Ikaw | Manang Eew |
| 2018 | Ipaglaban Mo! | Indang |
| 2018 | My Special Tatay | Divine |
| 2019 | Pepito Manaloto | Ruth |
| 2019 | Hiwaga ng Kambat | Delia Pamintuan |
| 2019 | Sino ang Maysala?: Mea Culpa | Barbara Villanueva |
| 2020 | Carpool | Tita Merly |
| 2021 | Las Hermanas | Rowena Mallari/Ellen "Lady E" Torillo |
| 2022 | Dear God | |
| 2022 | Daddy's Gurl | Elvira |
| 2022 | K-Love | Head Security |
| 2022 | Misis Piggy | Rowena David |
| 2023 | Dirty Linen | Precious Magtibay |
| 2024 | Makiling | Madam Mushka |
| 2024 | Black Rider | Venus' assistant |
| 2025 | Maalaala Mo Kaya | |
| 2025 | What Lies Beneath | Vangie Corrales |
| 2025–2026 | Roja | Happy Capinpin |
| 2026 | Miss Behave | Principal Mckenna |

=== Drama anthologies ===
| Year | Title | Role | Episode |
|---|---|---|---|
| 2018 | Ipaglaban Mo! | Indang | Set-up |
| 2018 | Wansapanataym | Nenita | Gelli in a Bottle |
| 2017 | Wansapanataym | Luring Almario | My Hair Lady |
| 2017 | Wansapanataym | Nicole | Amazing Ving |
| 2016 | Wansapanataym | Salome | Susi ni Sisay |
| 2014 | Wansapanataym | Olga | My Guardian Angel |
| 2013 | Wansapanataym | Bilang | Teacher's Pest |
| 2013 | Wansapanataym | Reyna Mikroba | Eye Naku! |
| 2013 | Wansapanataym | Mayumi | Petrang Paminta |
| 2012 | Wansapanataym | Esther | Andy and Super Sandok |
| 2012 | Wansapanataym | Yaya Dora | Eat Play Love |
| 2011 | Wansapanataym | Cita | Family Tree |
| 2011 | Wansapanataym | Mommy Bruka | Mac Ulit Ulit |
| 2010 | Wansapanataym | Barbie | Kakambal Ko'y Manyika |
| 2019 | Dear Uge | Tita Evs | Ang Babaeng Walang Closure |
| 2019 | Dear Uge | Pia | Dancing in Tandem |
| 2019 | Dear Uge | Teresa | Jas Got Lucky |
| 2018 | Dear Uge | Tiyay | Viva Probinsyana |
| 2018 | Dear Uge | Becky | Ang Sakit Pala Matanggihan |
| 2018 | Dear Uge | Teresa del Pilar | Honor Teacher |
| 2020 | Maalaala Mo Kaya | Terry | Kotse |
| 2015 | Maalaala Mo Kaya | Rosalinda | Camera |
| 2014 | Maalaala Mo Kaya | Madre | Liham |
| 2008 | Maalaala Mo Kaya | Ruby Lemon | Dalandan |
| 2022 | Magpakailanman | Christy | Nasaan Ka, Inay |
| 2018 | Magpakailanman | Hulya | Mga Batang Hubad: The Cyberporn Family Story |
| 2017 | Magpakailanman | Gloria's mom | My Heart Belongs to You: The Bud and Gloria Brown Story |
| 2022 | Tadhana | Mercy | Pahiram ng Pasko |
| 2020 | Tadhana | Marissa | Bayad Danyos |
| 2018 | Tadhana | Viring | Kural |
| 2019 | Maynila | Scarlet | Feelenial Mamsh |
| 2019 | Maynila | Cecilia | Love or Money |

== Accolades ==
| Year | Awards ceremony | Title | Result | Ref. |
|---|---|---|---|---|
| 2023 | 7th Outstanding Men and Women of the Philippines 2023 | Honoree | Won | |
