= Faye Lorenzo =

Filipino actress

- Born: Faye Lorenzo; Barcelona, Spain
- Occupations: Actress, model
- Years active: 2019–present
- Agent: Sparkle (since 2019)
- Height: 1.67 m (5 ft 5 1/2 in)
- Website: Faye Lorenzo on Instagram

Faye Lorenzo is a Filipino actress and model. She was previously seen at the Sunday night gag show Bubble Gang and better known for her roles in The Lost Recipe (2021), The World Between Us (2021) and Ikaw (2021).

== Career ==
In 2019 she signed a contract with GMA Artist Center.

== Filmography ==
=== Television ===
Year	Title	Role
2025-2026	Hating Kapatid	Nica (antagonist)
2025	Mga Batang Riles	Georgina (antagonist)
2024	Makiling	Pamela (protagonist)
2024	Asawa ng Asawa Ko	Verna / Mariposa (antagonist)
2024	Love. Die. Repeat.	Diane
2024	Open 24/7	Che
2024	Regal Studio Presents: Newlyweds	Mhaye
2023-24	TiktoClock	Herself/Guest
2023-24	Fast Talk with Boy Abunda	Herself/Guest
2023-24	Black Rider	Tricia
2023	Stolen Life	Ingrid (guest)
2023	Magandang Dilag	Missy Chan (guest)
2023	AraBella	Charice Decera (antagonist)
2022-25	Family Feud	Herself/Guest Player
2022	The Fake Life	Jai De Castro (protagonist)
2022	Pepito Manaloto: Tuloy ang Kuwento	Ollie
2022	Happy Together	Jona
2020-22	Dear Uge	Maxine/ Lucy / Red Carpet / Rhodora Velasquez
2020-23	The Boobay and Tekla Show	Herself/Guest
2021	The World Between Us	young Jacinta Delgado
2021	The Lost Recipe	Pepper Soriano (anti-hero)
2021	Pepito Manaloto	Chiqui
2021	Catch Me Out Philippines	Herself/Celebrity Catcher
2021	Wish Ko Lang!: Ang Pagpapanggap	Herself/Guest
2019-2021	Tadhana	Jasmine/Bernadette
2020	Descendants of the Sun: The Philippine Adaptation	Lovely
2020	Magpakailanman	Apple
2019-2020	Madrasta	Joan (protagonist)
2019‐2023	Bubble Gang	Herself

=== Films ===
- Ikaw (2021)
- Allura (2021)
- Ang Pangarap Kong Oskars (2023)
- Playtime (2024)
