= Yasser Marta =

Filipino actor

- Born: Las Piñas, Philippines
- Occupations: Actor; singer; model
- Years active: 2007–present
- Known for: Jun
- Height: 5 ft 10 in (178 cm)

Yasser Marta is a Filipino actor, singer and model. He was one of the members of GMA’s all-male group One Up.

== Personal life ==
Marta was born in Las Piñas to a Filipino mom and Portuguese father. He studies at Lyceum of the Philippines University. He started showbiz when he joined Eat Bulaga’s segment, Spogify, then bagged minor roles in GMA Network shows and became part of GMA’s boyband, One Up.

In 2025, he also invested into his dream house and farm.

=== Business ===
Marta invested in his business YM Automart, where he is responsible for operations and communications. During the COVID-19 pandemic, he was into buying and selling vintage cars.

== Filmography ==
=== Film ===
Year	Title	Role	Notes	Source
2007	Pi7ong Tagpo	Himself		
2021	Huwag Kang Lalabas	Lucas		
2025	Kontrabida Academy	Abet		

=== Television / Digital Series ===
Year	Title	Role	Notes	Source
2008	RPN NewsWatch Junior Edition	Himself / Anchor		
2009	Goin' Bulilit	Himself		
2015–2016	Eat Bulaga!	Himself		
2016	Magpakailanman	Gian	Episode: "Nang Mawala Ang Lahat"	
2016	Once Again	Eric Alfonso	Recurring Cast / Protagonist	
2016	A1 Ko Sa 'Yo	Jude	Episode: "Big Reveal"	
2017	Celebrity Bluff	Himself		
2017	People vs. the Stars	Himself		
2017	Full House Tonight	Himself		
2017	Mansyon	Classmate #3		
2017	Dear Uge	Arman	Episode: "For A Change"	
2017	Trops	Drew		
2017	Daig Kayo ng Lola Ko	Kumar's Assistant	Episode: "Huwag Sindakin si Stephen Quinn"	
2017	Mulawin vs. Ravena	Palong		
2017	Magpakailanman	John Paul	Episode: "Our Viral Love"	
2017	Tadhana	Manny	Episode: "Saudi Beauty Queen"	
2017	Wish Ko Lang	Tomas	Episode: "Iskolar"	
2017—2018	Ika-6 na Utos	Jonathan Valderama-Trindad	Extended Cast / Protagonist	
2018	Kambal, Karibal	Andre		
2018	Stories for the Soul	Rey Estancio	Episode: "Tinig ng Pananalig"	
2018	Dear Uge	Khriss	Episode: "Merry Mamshies"	
2018	Ika-5 Utos	Macky	Recurring Cast / Anti-Hero / Protagonist	
2018	Daig Kayo ng Lola Ko	Melchor	Episode: "Nonoy, ang Santang Pinoy: Part 1 / 4"	
2019	Love You Two	Edison Marquez		
2019	Magpakailanman	Jason	Episode: "Fathers, and Lovers"	
2019	One of the Baes	Young Steve		
2019	Magpakailanman	Mico / Llami	Episode: "Nang Ako ay iwan Mo"	
2019	Stories for the Soul	Jon	Episode: "Bespren"	
2019	Magpakailanman	Michael	Episode: "Ang Pumatay nang Dahil Sa iyo"	
2019	Bubble Gang	Himself		
2020–2021	Bilangin Ang Bituin Sa Langit	Anselmo "Jun" Santos Jr.		
2021	All-Out Sundays	Himself / Performer	Various Casts	
2021	Tadhana	Tirso	Episode: "Hating Kapatid"	
2021	Magpakailanman	Jolo	Episode: "May Forever sa Tabo"	
2021	My Fantastic Pag-Ibig	Nep	Episode: "Fairy Tale Romance"	
2021	Stories From The Heart	Ignacio "Nacho" Logronio / Iggy Boy	Episode: "Love On Air"	
2022	What We Could Be	Lucas Relosa		
2022	Tadhana	Third	Episode: "Ma'am"	
2023	Mga Lihim ni Urduja	Young Ibn Battuta		
2023–2024	Lovers & Liars	Carlos "Caloy" Marasigan	Lead Cast / Protagonist	
2024	Black Rider	Younger Edgardo	Guest Cast	
2024	Magpakailanman	Erick	Episode: "Asawa Na, Nanay Pa"	
2024—2025	Forever Young	Oliver Manabat	Guest Cast / Antagonist / Anti-Hero	
2025	My Ilonggo Girl	James	Supporting Cast	
2025	Lolong: Pangil ng Maynila	George "Goryo" Figueroa†	Guest Cast / Antagonist	
2025	Tadhana	John Kenneth	Episode: "Walang kawala (Part 1 / 3)"	
2026	Delivery Boi	Walter Aldomovar		
