= Pinoy Crime Stories =

Philippine television documentary show

- Title card
- Genre: Investigative journalism; Docudrama
- Directed by: May Delos Santos
- Presented by: John Consulta
- Country of origin: Philippines
- Original language: Tagalog

Production
- Executive producer: Ian Carlos Simbulan
- Camera setup: Multiple-camera setup
- Running time: 25–34 minutes
- Production company: GMA Public Affairs

Original release
- Network: GMA Network
- Release: September 16, 2023 – July 27, 2024

Pinoy Crime Stories (transl. Filipino crime stories) is a Philippine television investigative docudrama show broadcast by GMA Network. Hosted by John Consulta, it premiered on September 16, 2023, on the network's Sabado Star Power sa Hapon line up. The show concluded on July 27, 2024.
