= Tadhana =

Philippine television drama series

- Title card since 2025
- Genre: Drama
- Developed by: Marissa L. Flores
- Presented by: Marian Rivera
- Ending theme: "Kumapit Ka Lang" by Aicelle Santos
- Country of origin: Philippines
- Original language: Tagalog
- No. of episodes: (list of episodes)

Production
- Camera setup: Multiple-camera setup
- Running time: 20–40 minutes
- Production company: GMA Public Affairs

Original release
- Network: GMA Network
- Release: May 20, 2017 – present

Tadhana (transl. destiny) is a Philippine television drama anthology series broadcast by GMA Network. Hosted by Marian Rivera, it premiered on May 20, 2017 on the network's Sabado Star Power sa Hapon line up.

The series is streaming online on YouTube.

== Premise ==
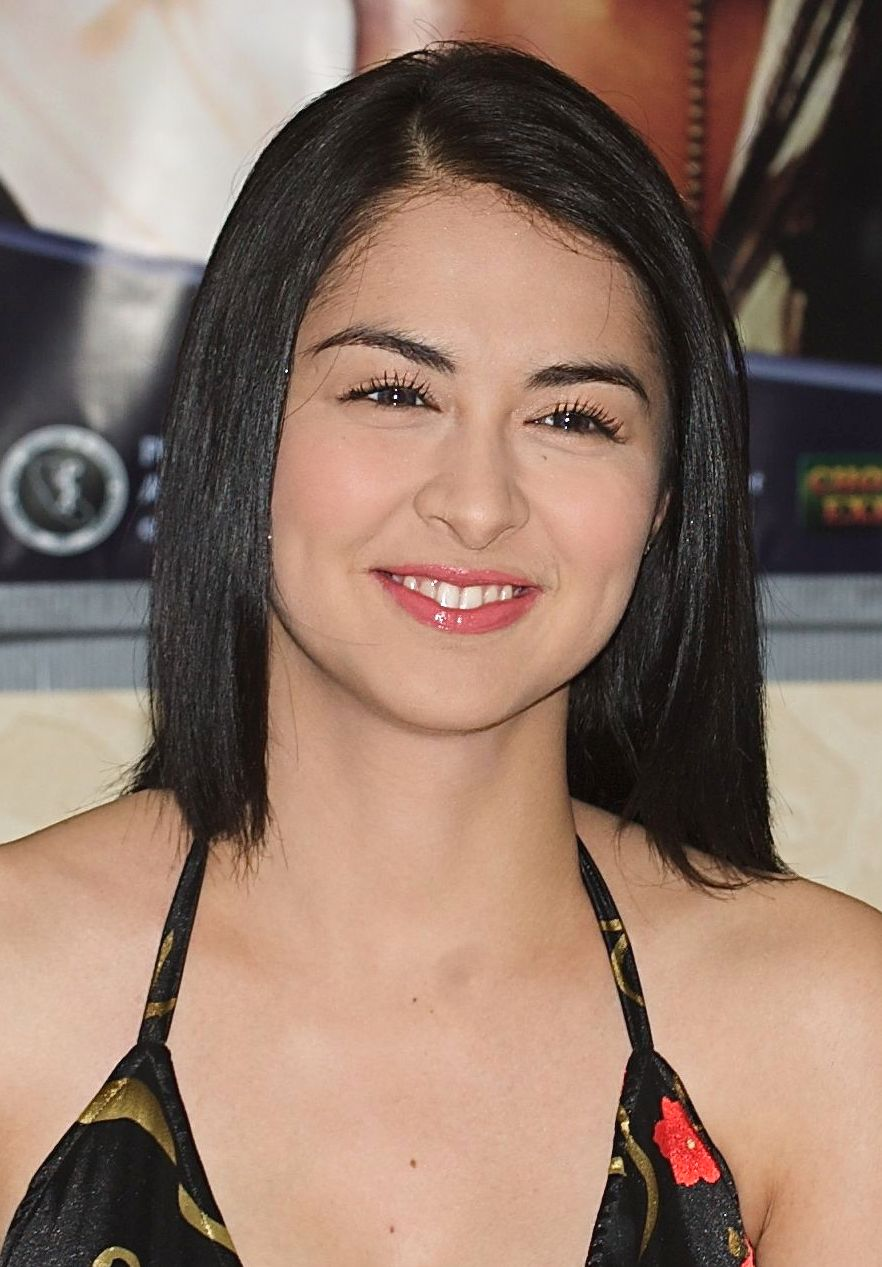
Marian Rivera serves as a host.

Featuring a story of an overseas Filipino worker's struggles and sacrifices to work in a foreign land, and face separation and being homesick across the world in the hope of the loved ones' better future.

== Production ==
In March 2019, Dingdong Dantes served as substitute host of the show, after Marian Rivera went to parental leave due to her pregnancy. In March 2020, principal photography was halted due to the enhanced community quarantine in Luzon caused by the COVID-19 pandemic. Filming was continued in September 2020. The show resumed its programming on October 3, 2020.

== Ratings ==
According to AGB Nielsen Philippines' Nationwide Urban Television Audience Measurement People in television homes, the pilot episode of Tadhana earned a 6.9% rating.

== Accolades ==
Accolades received by Tadhana
Year	Award	Category	Recipient	Result	Ref.
2017	31st PMPC Star Awards for Television	Best Drama Anthology	Tadhana	Nominated	
2018	8th Overseas Filipino Workers Gawad Parangal	Best Actress	Marian Rivera	Won	
2018	Commission on DFA	Best OFW Show	Tadhana	Won	
2018	32nd PMPC Star Awards for Television	Best Drama Anthology	Tadhana	Nominated	
2019	33rd PMPC Star Awards for Television	Best Drama Anthology	Tadhana	Nominated	
2019	33rd PMPC Star Awards for Television	Best Single Performance by an Actress	Yasmien Kurdi ("Sukdulan")	Won	
2021	34th PMPC Star Awards for Television	Best Drama Anthology	Tadhana	Nominated	
2021	34th PMPC Star Awards for Television	Best Single Performance by an Actress	Alessandra de Rossi ("Sisters at War")	Nominated	
2021	34th PMPC Star Awards for Television	Best Single Performance by an Actress	Jasmine Curtis-Smith ("Sex Slave")	Nominated	
2021	34th PMPC Star Awards for Television	Best Single Performance by an Actress	Sunshine Dizon ("Magkano ang Forever")	Won	
2023	35th PMPC Star Awards for Television	Best Drama Anthology	Tadhana	Nominated	
2023	35th PMPC Star Awards for Television	Best Single Performance by an Actress	Gelli de Belen ("Beast Friend")	Nominated	
2023	35th PMPC Star Awards for Television	Best Single Performance by an Actress	Jaclyn Jose ("Bekiry")	Nominated	
2025	37th PMPC Star Awards for Television	Best Child Performer	Brianna Advincula ("Bayad-Utang")	Nominated	
2025	37th PMPC Star Awards for Television	Best Drama Anthology	Tadhana	Nominated	
2025	37th PMPC Star Awards for Television	Best Single Performance by an Actress	Irma Adlawan ("Golden Love")	Nominated	
2025	38th PMPC Star Awards for Television	Best Drama Anthology	Tadhana	Pending	
2025	38th PMPC Star Awards for Television	Best Single Performance by an Actor	Mon Confiado ("Sino si Alice")	Pending	
2025	38th PMPC Star Awards for Television	Best Single Performance by an Actress	Ara Mina ("Sugar Daddy")	Pending	
