= List of GMA Network original drama series =

The following is the list of original Philippine television drama series that first aired or are set to air on GMA Network, a free-to-air commercial broadcasting television and radio network in the Philippines owned by GMA Network Inc. Drama series are sorted in the decade and the year of its release, with its international title included in parentheses.

== 1980s ==
List of 1980s drama series, showing the premiere date and finale date
Title	Premiere	Finale
Anna Liza	February 4, 1980	May 10, 1985
Guni Guni	1980	1980
Nang Dahil sa Pag-Ibig (Because of Love)	September 7, 1981	January 1, 1982
Yagit (The Street Urchins)	April 25, 1983	August 2, 1985
Amorsola	August 5, 1985	1985
Mirasol del Cielo	January 6, 1986	February 27, 1987
Andrea Amor	1986	1986
Princess	1986	1990
Gintong Kristal (Golden Crystal)	March 2, 1987	1988
Golpe de Gulo	1987	1989
Kaming Mga Ulila (The Orphans)	1987	1987
Evelio	1988	1988
Kadenang Rosas (Chain of Roses)	1988	1989

== 1990s ==
=== 1994 ===
List of 1994 drama series, showing the premiere date and finale date
Title	Premiere	Finale
Batong Buhay (Bloodstream)	1994	1994
Angelito	1994	1996

=== 1995 ===
List of 1995 drama series, showing the premiere date and finale date
Title	Premiere	Finale
Valiente (Brave)	January 30, 1995	September 12, 1997
Kadenang Kristal (Crystal Chain)	July 31, 1995	August 9, 1996
T.G.I.S.	August 12, 1995	November 27, 1999
Villa Quintana	November 6, 1995	January 24, 1997

=== 1996 ===
List of 1996 drama series, showing the premiere date and finale date
Title	Premiere	Finale
Lyra	April 8, 1996	January 3, 1997
Mia Gracia	August 12, 1996	August 15, 1997
Anna Karenina	November 10, 1996	April 28, 2002

=== 1997 ===
List of 1997 drama series, showing the premiere date and finale date
Title	Premiere	Finale
Ikaw na Sana (Destiny)	March 17, 1997	April 3, 1998
Growing Up	June 2, 1997	February 12, 1999
Del Tierro	September 15, 1997	May 14, 1999

=== 1998 ===
List of 1998 drama series, showing the premiere date and finale date
Title	Premiere	Finale
Ganyan Kita Kamahal (That's How Much I Love You)	April 13, 1998	August 7, 1998
Halik sa Apoy (Fiery Kiss)	August 10, 1998	February 26, 1999
TEXT (The Extreme Team)	1998	1999

=== 1999 ===
List of 1999 drama series, showing the premiere date and finale date
Title	Premiere	Finale
Rio Del Mar	February 15, 1999	March 9, 2001
Di Ba't Ikaw (Love and Revenge)	May 17, 1999	October 29, 1999
Kirara, Ano ang Kulay ng Pag-ibig? (Kirara, What is the Color of Love?)	August 16, 1999	November 2, 2001
Pintados (The Painted Ones)	September 4, 1999	September 2, 2000
L	1999	2000
Codename: Verano	1999	2000
Click	December 4, 1999	July 24, 2004
Liwanag ng Hatinggabi (Light of Midnight)	December 6, 1999	March 27, 2000

== 2000s ==
=== 2000 ===
List of 2000 drama series, showing the premiere date and finale date
Title	Premiere	Finale
Tago Ka Na! (Hide)	April 3, 2000	May 29, 2000
Umulan Man o Umaraw (Seasons of Love)	June 5, 2000	August 28, 2000
Munting Anghel (Little Angel)	September 4, 2000	November 27, 2000
Tuwing Kapiling Ka (When I'm With You)	December 4, 2000	March 19, 2001

=== 2001 ===
List of 2001 drama series, showing the premiere date and finale date
Title	Premiere	Finale
Biglang Sibol, Bayang Impasibol	March 12, 2001	January 25, 2002
Ikaw Lang ang Mamahalin (Only You)	March 26, 2001	November 1, 2002
Sa Dako Pa Roon (Beyond)	September 27, 2001	November 30, 2001
Sana ay Ikaw na Nga (It Might Be You)	December 3, 2001	April 25, 2003

=== 2002 ===
List of 2002 drama series, showing the premiere date and finale date
Title	Premiere	Finale
Kung Mawawala Ka (A World Without You)	April 8, 2002	June 6, 2003
Kahit Kailan (Always)	May 5, 2002	July 6, 2003
Ang Iibigin ay Ikaw (My One and Only Love)	July 15, 2002	April 11, 2003
Habang Kapiling Ka (With You)	November 4, 2002	October 17, 2003

=== 2003 ===
List of 2003 drama series, showing the premiere date and finale date
Title	Premiere	Finale
Ang Iibigin ay Ikaw Pa Rin (My One and Only Love 2)	April 14, 2003	August 22, 2003
Narito ang Puso Ko (Here is My Heart)	June 9, 2003	March 5, 2004
Hawak Ko ang Langit (Heaven in My Hands)	July 14, 2003	November 7, 2003
Twin Hearts	October 20, 2003	June 18, 2004
Walang Hanggan (Eternity)	November 10, 2003	February 27, 2004

=== 2004 ===
List of 2004 drama series, showing the premiere date and finale date
Title	Premiere	Finale
Te Amo, Maging Sino Ka Man (Te Amo, Speaking the Language of Love)	February 2, 2004	September 17, 2004
Ikaw sa Puso Ko (In My Heart)	March 1, 2004	October 15, 2004
Hanggang Kailan (Circle of Hearts)	March 8, 2004	July 30, 2004
Marinara	June 21, 2004	October 1, 2004
Mulawin	August 2, 2004	March 18, 2005
Joyride	August 16, 2004	March 11, 2005
Forever in My Heart	September 27, 2004	January 7, 2005
Leya, ang Pinakamagandang Babae sa Ilalim ng Lupa (Leya, The Most Beautiful Numbali)	October 18, 2004	January 28, 2005

=== 2005 ===
List of 2005 drama series, showing the premiere date and finale date
Title	Premiere	Finale
Saang Sulok ng Langit (Heaven's Corner)	January 31, 2005	August 12, 2005
Mukha (Facade)	March 14, 2005	June 10, 2005
Darna	April 4, 2005	November 25, 2005
Encantadia	May 2, 2005	December 9, 2005
Ganti (Vengeance of the Heart)	June 13, 2005	October 21, 2005
Sugo (The Chosen One)	July 4, 2005	February 10, 2006
Kung Mamahalin Mo Lang Ako (If Only You Love Me)	August 15, 2005	February 17, 2006
Agos (Stream of Life)	October 24, 2005	January 6, 2006
Etheria: Ang Ikalimang Kaharian ng Encantadia (Etheria: The Fifth Kingdom of Encantadia)	December 12, 2005	February 17, 2006

=== 2006 ===
List of 2006 drama series, showing the premiere date and finale date
Title	Premiere	Finale
Tinig (Sonata of Heart)	January 9, 2006	April 12, 2006
Agawin Mo Man ang Lahat (Stolen Love)	February 20, 2006	August 11, 2006
Hongkong Flight 143	February 20, 2006	May 12, 2006
Encantadia: Pag-ibig Hanggang Wakas (Avisala Encantadia: Love Until the End)	February 20, 2006	April 28, 2006
Majika	March 20, 2006	September 29, 2006
Duyan (Cradle of Love)	April 17, 2006	July 21, 2006
Fantastikids	May 6, 2006	December 9, 2006
I Luv NY (I Love New York)	May 15, 2006	September 8, 2006
Captain Barbell	May 29, 2006	January 12, 2007
Linlang (Deception)	July 24, 2006	September 22, 2006
Pinakamamahal (Beloved)	August 14, 2006	November 3, 2006
Bakekang	September 11, 2006	March 30, 2007
Dangal (Honor)	September 25, 2006	November 24, 2006
Atlantika	October 2, 2006	February 9, 2007
Makita Ka Lang Muli (Just to See You Again)	November 6, 2006	February 16, 2007

=== 2007 ===
List of 2007 drama series, showing the premiere date and finale date
Title	Premiere	Finale
Asian Treasures	January 15, 2007	June 29, 2007
Princess Charming	January 29, 2007	April 27, 2007
Super Twins	February 12, 2007	June 1, 2007
Muli (In Love Again)	February 19, 2007	May 18, 2007
Lupin	April 9, 2007	August 17, 2007
Fantastic Man	April 14, 2007	November 10, 2007
Sinasamba Kita (All for You)	April 30, 2007	July 27, 2007
Pati Ba Pintig ng Puso (Of Love and Lies)	May 21, 2007	September 7, 2007
Impostora (The Impostor)	June 4, 2007	September 21, 2007
Mga Mata ni Anghelita (Angelita's Eyes)	July 2, 2007	October 5, 2007
Kung Mahawi Man ang Ulap (Through It All)	July 30, 2007	November 9, 2007
MariMar	August 13, 2007	March 14, 2008
Pasan Ko ang Daigdig (World on My Shoulders)	September 10, 2007	January 11, 2008
Zaido: Pulis Pangkalawakan (Zaido: The Space Sheriff)	September 24, 2007	February 8, 2008
La Vendetta	October 29, 2007	January 18, 2008
My Only Love	November 12, 2007	February 29, 2008
Kamandag (Venom)	November 19, 2007	April 25, 2008

=== 2008 ===
List of 2008 drama series, showing the premiere date and finale date
Title	Premiere	Finale
Maging Akin Ka Lamang (Till You Are Mine)	January 21, 2008	May 9, 2008
E.S.P.	February 4, 2008	May 8, 2008
Joaquin Bordado	February 11, 2008	July 11, 2008
Kaputol ng Isang Awit (Unsung Melody)	March 3, 2008	June 13, 2008
Babangon Ako't Dudurugin Kita (Sweet Revenge)	March 24, 2008	June 27, 2008
Tasya Fantasya	April 6, 2008	July 13, 2008
Dyesebel	April 28, 2008	October 17, 2008
Magdusa Ka (Misery)	May 12, 2008	August 29, 2008
Gaano Kadalas ang Minsan? (Love Me Again)	June 23, 2008	November 7, 2008
Ako si Kim Samsoon (My Name is Kim Samsoon)	June 30, 2008	October 10, 2008
Codename: Asero	July 14, 2008	November 14, 2008
Una Kang Naging Akin (When You Were Mine)	September 1, 2008	December 19, 2008
LaLola	October 13, 2008	February 6, 2009
Gagambino	October 20, 2008	February 20, 2009
Saan Darating ang Umaga? (Morning Awaits)	November 10, 2008	February 27, 2009
Luna Mystika	November 17, 2008	March 6, 2009

=== 2009 ===
List of 2009 drama series, showing the premiere date and finale date
Title	Premiere	Finale
Ang Babaeng Hinugot sa Aking Tadyang (Dangerous Love)	February 2, 2009	May 1, 2009
Paano Ba ang Mangarap? (Without Your Love)	February 16, 2009	June 5, 2009
Totoy Bato	February 23, 2009	July 3, 2009
Dapat Ka Bang Mahalin? (Second Chances)	March 2, 2009	June 19, 2009
All About Eve	March 9, 2009	June 5, 2009
Zorro	March 23, 2009	August 7, 2009
Ngayon at Kailanman (Until Forever)	June 8, 2009	September 25, 2009
Adik Sa'Yo (Love Games)	June 8, 2009	September 11, 2009
Kung Aagawin Mo ang Lahat sa Akin (When All is Gone)	June 22, 2009	September 25, 2009
All My Life	June 29, 2009	September 18, 2009
Rosalinda	July 6, 2009	November 27, 2009
Darna	August 10, 2009	February 19, 2010
Stairway to Heaven	September 14, 2009	December 11, 2009
Ikaw Sana (To Love You)	September 21, 2009	February 5, 2010
Kaya Kong Abutin ang Langit (Selfish Desires)	September 28, 2009	February 5, 2010
Tinik sa Dibdib (Damage)	September 28, 2009	January 22, 2010
Full House	November 30, 2009	February 26, 2010
Sana Ngayong Pasko (A Christmas Hope)	December 7, 2009	January 8, 2010

== 2010s ==
=== 2010 ===
List of 2010 drama series, showing the premiere date and finale date
Title	Premiere	Finale
The Last Prince	January 11, 2010	June 25, 2010
Ina, Kasusuklaman Ba Kita? (A Mother's Sacrifice)	January 25, 2010	May 21, 2010
Gumapang Ka sa Lusak (Secret Affairs)	February 8, 2010	June 18, 2010
First Time	February 8, 2010	May 28, 2010
Panday Kids	February 22, 2010	June 4, 2010
Diva	March 1, 2010	July 30, 2010
Basahang Ginto (Golden Heart)	May 24, 2010	September 24, 2010
Langit sa Piling Mo (Heaven With You)	May 31, 2010	September 17, 2010
Pilyang Kerubin (My Silly Angel)	June 7, 2010	August 27, 2010
Trudis Liit (Little Trudis)	June 21, 2010	October 22, 2010
Endless Love	June 28, 2010	October 15, 2010
Ilumina	August 2, 2010	November 19, 2010
Grazilda	September 13, 2010	January 7, 2011
Bantatay (The Guardian)	September 20, 2010	February 25, 2011
Reel Love Presents Tween Hearts	September 26, 2010	June 10, 2012
Koreana (Jenna)	October 11, 2010	February 25, 2011
Beauty Queen	October 18, 2010	February 4, 2011
Little Star	October 25, 2010	February 11, 2011
Jillian: Namamasko Po (Jillian, The Christmas Doll)	November 29, 2010	January 21, 2011

=== 2011 ===
List of 2011 drama series, showing the premiere date and finale date
Title	Premiere	Finale
Dwarfina	January 10, 2011	May 6, 2011
Alakdana (The Lady Scorpion)	January 24, 2011	May 13, 2011
Machete	January 24, 2011	March 18, 2011
I ♥ You, Pare! (I ♥ You, Bro!)	February 7, 2011	May 27, 2011
Nita Negrita (Nita)	February 14, 2011	June 10, 2011
My Lover, My Wife	February 28, 2011	May 27, 2011
Magic Palayok (Magic Pot)	February 28, 2011	July 1, 2011
Captain Barbell: Ang Pagbabalik (Captain Barbell: The Return)	March 28, 2011	July 29, 2011
Munting Heredera (Little Heiress)	May 9, 2011	February 3, 2012
Blusang Itim (Beauty Within)	May 16, 2011	August 12, 2011
Sisid (Pearl Diver)	May 30, 2011	September 16, 2011
Amaya	May 30, 2011	January 13, 2012
Sinner or Saint	June 13, 2011	October 7, 2011
Futbolilits	July 4, 2011	October 14, 2011
Mistaken Identity	July 23, 2011	August 27, 2011
Time of My Life	August 1, 2011	November 18, 2011
Pahiram ng Isang Ina (Lend Me a Mom)	August 15, 2011	November 11, 2011
Iglot	August 29, 2011	November 11, 2011
Kung Aagawin Mo ang Langit (If You'll Steal Heaven)	September 19, 2011	February 3, 2012
Ikaw Lang ang Mamahalin (Only You)	October 10, 2011	February 10, 2012
Daldalita	October 17, 2011	February 3, 2012
Kokak (The Frog Princess)	November 14, 2011	March 2, 2012

=== 2012 ===
List of 2012 drama series, showing the premiere date and finale date
Title	Premiere	Finale
Legacy	January 16, 2012	June 1, 2012
Broken Vow	February 6, 2012	June 15, 2012
Alice Bungisngis and Her Wonder Walis (Giggly Alice)	February 6, 2012	June 8, 2012
Biritera (Diva)	February 6, 2012	May 18, 2012
The Good Daughter	February 13, 2012	June 1, 2012
My Beloved	February 13, 2012	June 8, 2012
Hiram na Puso (A Change of Heart)	March 5, 2012	July 6, 2012
Luna Blanca	May 21, 2012	October 26, 2012
Kasalanan Bang Ibigin Ka? (Forbidden Love)	June 4, 2012	August 31, 2012
Makapiling Kang Muli (Together Again)	June 4, 2012	September 7, 2012
My Daddy Dearest	June 11, 2012	August 17, 2012
One True Love	June 11, 2012	October 5, 2012
Together Forever	June 17, 2012	September 8, 2012
Faithfully	June 18, 2012	October 5, 2012
Hindi Ka na Mag-iisa (Never Be Alone)	July 9, 2012	October 26, 2012
Sana ay Ikaw na Nga (It Might Be You)	September 3, 2012	February 8, 2013
Aso ni San Roque (San Roque's Pet)	September 10, 2012	January 11, 2013
Magdalena: Anghel sa Putikan	October 8, 2012	January 18, 2013
Coffee Prince	October 8, 2012	November 23, 2012
Cielo de Angelina (Angelina's Sky)	October 22, 2012	January 4, 2013
Yesterday's Bride	October 29, 2012	February 22, 2013
Temptation of Wife	October 29, 2012	April 5, 2013
Paroa: Ang Kuwento ni Mariposa (The Story of Mariposa)	November 5, 2012	March 1, 2013
Pahiram ng Sandali (Chasing Moments)	November 26, 2012	March 15, 2013
Teen Gen	December 16, 2012	June 30, 2013

=== 2013 ===
List of 2013 drama series, showing the premiere date and finale date
Title	Premiere	Finale
Indio	January 14, 2013	May 31, 2013
Forever	January 21, 2013	April 19, 2013
Bukod Kang Pinagpala (Mother's Love)	February 11, 2013	June 7, 2013
Unforgettable	February 25, 2013	May 31, 2013
Mundo Mo'y Akin (Deception)	March 18, 2013	September 6, 2013
Love & Lies	April 8, 2013	June 7, 2013
Kakambal ni Eliana (Eliana's Twin)	April 15, 2013	August 23, 2013
Home Sweet Home	April 22, 2013	July 19, 2013
Mga Basang Sisiw (Lost Children)	June 3, 2013	November 1, 2013
Anna Karenina	June 3, 2013	September 20, 2013
Maghihintay Pa Rin (Bitter Sweet Life)	June 10, 2013	September 27, 2013
My Husband's Lover	June 10, 2013	October 18, 2013
With a Smile	June 24, 2013	September 20, 2013
Binoy Henyo (Wonder Kid)	July 22, 2013	September 20, 2013
Pyra: Babaeng Apoy (Pyra: The Fire Woman)	August 26, 2013	November 29, 2013
Akin Pa Rin ang Bukas (Perfect Vengeance)	September 9, 2013	December 27, 2013
Dormitoryo (The Dormitory)	September 22, 2013	December 22, 2013
Prinsesa ng Buhay Ko (My Girl)	September 23, 2013	January 24, 2014
Kahit Nasaan Ka Man (Love Sonata)	September 23, 2013	November 15, 2013
Magkano Ba ang Pag-ibig? (Wealth and Passion)	September 30, 2013	February 14, 2014
Genesis	October 14, 2013	December 27, 2013
Katipunan	October 19, 2013	December 28, 2013
Villa Quintana	November 4, 2013	June 6, 2014
Adarna	November 18, 2013	March 7, 2014

=== 2014 ===
List of 2014 drama series, showing the premiere date and finale date
Title	Premiere	Finale
The Borrowed Wife	January 20, 2014	May 23, 2014
Paraiso Ko'y Ikaw (My Paradise)	January 27, 2014	March 28, 2014
Carmela: Ang Pinakamagandang Babae sa Mundong Ibabaw	January 27, 2014	May 23, 2014
Rhodora X	January 27, 2014	May 30, 2014
Innamorata	February 17, 2014	June 20, 2014
Kambal Sirena (Footsteps of a Mermaid)	March 10, 2014	June 27, 2014
Niño	May 26, 2014	September 12, 2014
Ang Dalawang Mrs. Real (The Other Mrs. Reals)	June 2, 2014	September 19, 2014
The Half Sisters	June 9, 2014	January 15, 2016
Dading	June 23, 2014	October 10, 2014
My BFF	June 30, 2014	October 3, 2014
My Destiny	June 30, 2014	October 17, 2014
Sa Puso ni Dok (Village Doctor)	August 24, 2014	September 28, 2014
Strawberry Lane	September 15, 2014	January 2, 2015
Hiram na Alaala (Memories of Love)	September 22, 2014	January 9, 2015
Ang Lihim ni Annasandra (The Secret of Annasandra)	October 6, 2014	February 6, 2015
Yagit (Pushcart of Dreams)	October 13, 2014	July 24, 2015
Ilustrado	October 20, 2014	November 14, 2014
More Than Words	November 17, 2014	March 6, 2015

=== 2015 ===
List of 2015 drama series, showing the premiere date and finale date
Title	Premiere	Finale
Once Upon a Kiss	January 5, 2015	May 1, 2015
Second Chances (Another Chance)	January 12, 2015	May 8, 2015
Kailan Ba Tama ang Mali? (Ruins of Love)	February 9, 2015	May 8, 2015
Pari 'Koy (My Holy Bro)	March 9, 2015	August 21, 2015
InstaDad	April 5, 2015	July 5, 2015
Let the Love Begin	May 4, 2015	August 7, 2015
Healing Hearts	May 11, 2015	September 11, 2015
The Rich Man's Daughter	May 11, 2015	August 7, 2015
My Mother's Secret	May 25, 2015	August 7, 2015
Buena Familia	July 28, 2015	March 4, 2016
Beautiful Strangers	August 10, 2015	November 27, 2015
My Faithful Husband	August 10, 2015	November 13, 2015
MariMar	August 24, 2015	January 8, 2016
Destiny Rose	September 14, 2015	March 11, 2016
Princess in the Palace	September 21, 2015	June 10, 2016
Dangwa	October 26, 2015	January 29, 2016
Little Nanay (Little Mommy)	November 16, 2015	March 23, 2016
Because of You	November 30, 2015	May 13, 2016

=== 2016 ===
List of 2016 drama series, showing the premiere date and finale date
Title	Premiere	Finale
Wish I May	January 18, 2016	May 20, 2016
That's My Amboy (My Superstar)	January 25, 2016	April 29, 2016
Hanggang Makita Kang Muli (Until We Meet Again)	March 7, 2016	July 15, 2016
The Millionaire's Wife	March 14, 2016	June 24, 2016
Poor Señorita	March 28, 2016	July 15, 2016
Naku, Boss Ko!	April 25, 2016	May 5, 2016
Once Again	May 2, 2016	July 22, 2016
Juan Happy Love Story	May 16, 2016	September 2, 2016
Magkaibang Mundo (My Secret Love)	May 23, 2016	September 16, 2016
Calle Siete	June 13, 2016	October 21, 2016
Sa Piling ni Nanay (Ysabel)	June 27, 2016	January 27, 2017
Sinungaling Mong Puso (Cruel Lies)	July 18, 2016	October 28, 2016
Encantadia	July 18, 2016	May 19, 2017
Someone to Watch Over Me	September 5, 2016	January 6, 2017
Oh, My Mama!	September 19, 2016	December 2, 2016
Alyas Robin Hood (Bow of Justice)	September 19, 2016	November 24, 2017
Trops	October 24, 2016	September 22, 2017
Hahamakin ang Lahat (Love and Defiance)	October 31, 2016	February 17, 2017
Ika-6 na Utos (A Woman Scorned)	December 5, 2016	March 17, 2018

=== 2017 ===
List of 2017 drama series, showing the premiere date and finale date
Title	Premiere	Finale
Meant to Be	January 9, 2017	June 23, 2017
Pinulot Ka Lang sa Lupa (Envy)	January 30, 2017	April 12, 2017
Legally Blind	February 20, 2017	June 30, 2017
Destined to Be Yours	February 27, 2017	May 26, 2017
D' Originals	April 17, 2017	July 7, 2017
Mulawin vs. Ravena	May 22, 2017	September 15, 2017
My Love from the Star	May 29, 2017	August 11, 2017
I Heart Davao (My Sweet Heart)	June 26, 2017	August 18, 2017
Impostora	July 3, 2017	February 9, 2018
Haplos (Angela)	July 10, 2017	February 23, 2018
G.R.I.N.D. Get Ready It's a New Day	August 19, 2017	October 21, 2017
My Korean Jagiya	August 21, 2017	January 12, 2018
Super Ma'am (My Teacher, My Hero)	September 18, 2017	January 26, 2018
Kambal, Karibal (Heart & Soul)	November 27, 2017	August 3, 2018

=== 2018 ===
List of 2018 drama series, showing the premiere date and finale date
Title	Premiere	Finale
The One That Got Away	January 15, 2018	May 18, 2018
Sirkus	January 21, 2018	April 15, 2018
Sherlock Jr.	January 29, 2018	April 27, 2018
The Stepdaughters	February 12, 2018	October 19, 2018
Hindi Ko Kayang Iwan Ka (Stay With Me)	February 26, 2018	August 31, 2018
Ang Forever Ko'y Ikaw (Close to You)	March 12, 2018	May 4, 2018
Contessa	March 19, 2018	September 8, 2018
The Cure	April 30, 2018	July 27, 2018
My Guitar Princess	May 7, 2018	July 13, 2018
Inday Will Always Love You (Happy Together)	May 21, 2018	October 5, 2018
Kapag Nahati ang Puso (Broken Hearts)	July 16, 2018	November 2, 2018
Victor Magtanggol (Heart of Courage)	July 30, 2018	November 16, 2018
Onanay (The Way to Your Heart)	August 6, 2018	March 15, 2019
My Special Tatay (The Heart Knows)	September 3, 2018	March 29, 2019
Ika-5 Utos (Revenge)	September 10, 2018	February 8, 2019
Pamilya Roces (Family Jewels)	October 8, 2018	December 14, 2018
Barangay 143	October 21, 2018	June 30, 2019
Asawa Ko, Karibal Ko (Silent Shadow)	October 22, 2018	March 2, 2019
Cain at Abel (Color of My Blood)	November 19, 2018	February 15, 2019

=== 2019 ===
List of 2019 drama series, showing the premiere date and finale date
Title	Premiere	Finale
TODA One I Love (To the One I Love)	February 4, 2019	April 17, 2019
Inagaw na Bituin (Written in the Stars)	February 11, 2019	May 17, 2019
Kara Mia	February 18, 2019	June 28, 2019
Hiram na Anak (Borrowed Embrace)	February 25, 2019	May 3, 2019
Dragon Lady	March 4, 2019	July 20, 2019
Sahaya	March 18, 2019	September 6, 2019
Bihag (The Silent Thief)	April 1, 2019	August 16, 2019
Love You Two	April 22, 2019	September 13, 2019
Dahil sa Pag-ibig (For Love or Money)	May 20, 2019	October 4, 2019
The Better Woman	July 1, 2019	September 27, 2019
Hanggang sa Dulo ng Buhay Ko (Obsession)	July 22, 2019	October 19, 2019
Prima Donnas	August 19, 2019	April 30, 2022
Beautiful Justice	September 9, 2019	January 24, 2020
The Gift	September 16, 2019	February 7, 2020
One of the Baes (My Crown Princess)	September 30, 2019	January 31, 2020
Madrasta (A Place in Your Heart)	October 7, 2019	February 21, 2020
Magkaagaw (Broken Faith)	October 21, 2019	March 31, 2021

== 2020s ==
=== 2020 ===
List of 2020 drama series, showing the premiere date and finale date
Title	Premiere	Finale
Anak ni Waray vs. Anak ni Biday (Hidden Lies)	January 27, 2020	March 12, 2021
Love of My Life	February 3, 2020	March 19, 2021
Descendants of the Sun: The Philippine Adaptation	February 10, 2020	December 25, 2020
Bilangin ang Bituin sa Langit (Stars of Hope)	February 24, 2020	March 26, 2021
Kaibigan: The Series	December 5, 2020	January 23, 2021

=== 2021 ===
List of 2021 drama series, showing the premiere date and finale date
Title	Premiere	Finale
Owe My Love	February 15, 2021	June 4, 2021
Babawiin Ko ang Lahat (All or Nothing)	February 22, 2021	May 21, 2021
First Yaya (The First Nanny)	March 15, 2021	July 2, 2021
Heartful Café	April 26, 2021	June 18, 2021
Agimat ng Agila (The Eagle's Quest)	May 1, 2021	May 7, 2022
Ang Dalawang Ikaw (The Other You)	June 21, 2021	September 10, 2021
The World Between Us	July 5, 2021	January 7, 2022
Legal Wives	July 26, 2021	November 12, 2021
Nagbabagang Luha (Flames of Love)	August 2, 2021	October 23, 2021
To Have & to Hold	September 27, 2021	December 17, 2021
Las Hermanas	October 25, 2021	January 14, 2022
I Left My Heart in Sorsogon	November 15, 2021	February 11, 2022

=== 2022 ===
List of 2022 drama series, showing the premiere date and finale date
Title	Premiere	Finale
Mano Po Legacy: The Family Fortune	January 3, 2022	February 25, 2022
Little Princess	January 10, 2022	April 22, 2022
First Lady	February 14, 2022	July 1, 2022
Widows' Web	February 28, 2022	April 29, 2022
Artikulo 247	March 7, 2022	June 3, 2022
Mano Po Legacy: Her Big Boss	March 14, 2022	June 2, 2022
Raya Sirena	April 24, 2022	June 5, 2022
Raising Mamay	April 25, 2022	July 29, 2022
Apoy sa Langit (Broken Promise)	May 2, 2022	September 3, 2022
False Positive	May 2, 2022	May 27, 2022
Bolera (Break Shot)	May 30, 2022	August 26, 2022
The Fake Life	June 6, 2022	September 23, 2022
Love You Stranger	June 6, 2022	August 12, 2022
Lolong (Crocodile Whisperer)	July 4, 2022	June 13, 2025
Return to Paradise	August 1, 2022	November 4, 2022
What We Could Be	August 29, 2022	October 27, 2022
Abot-Kamay na Pangarap (Hands on the Dream)	September 5, 2022	October 19, 2024
Nakarehas na Puso	September 26, 2022	January 13, 2023
Start-Up PH	September 26, 2022	December 23, 2022
Maria Clara at Ibarra	October 3, 2022	February 24, 2023
Mano Po Legacy: The Flower Sisters	October 31, 2022	January 13, 2023
Unica Hija	November 7, 2022	March 3, 2023

=== 2023 ===
List of 2023 drama series, showing the premiere date and finale date
Title	Premiere	Finale
Underage	January 16, 2023	May 5, 2023
Mga Lihim ni Urduja	February 27, 2023	May 5, 2023
AraBella	March 6, 2023	June 23, 2023
Hearts on Ice	March 13, 2023	June 16, 2023
The Write One	March 20, 2023	May 25, 2023
The Seed of Love	May 8, 2023	August 25, 2023
Voltes V: Legacy	May 8, 2023	September 8, 2023
Unbreak My Heart	May 29, 2023	November 16, 2023
Walang Matigas na Pulis sa Matinik na Misis	June 4, 2023	February 2, 2025
Royal Blood	June 19, 2023	September 22, 2023
Magandang Dilag	June 26, 2023	November 10, 2023
The Missing Husband	August 28, 2023	December 15, 2023
Maging Sino Ka Man	September 11, 2023	November 3, 2023
Love Before Sunrise	September 25, 2023	December 29, 2023
Black Rider	November 6, 2023	July 26, 2024
Stolen Life	November 13, 2023	March 1, 2024
Lovers & Liars	November 20, 2023	January 11, 2024

=== 2024 ===
List of 2024 drama series, showing the premiere date and finale date
Title	Premiere	Finale
Makiling	January 8, 2024	May 3, 2024
Love. Die. Repeat.	January 15, 2024	March 27, 2024
Asawa ng Asawa Ko	January 15, 2024	January 9, 2025
Lilet Matias: Attorney-at-Law	March 4, 2024	February 8, 2025
My Guardian Alien	April 1, 2024	June 28, 2024
Widows' War	July 1, 2024	January 17, 2025
Pulang Araw	July 29, 2024	December 27, 2024
Shining Inheritance	September 9, 2024	January 10, 2025
Maka	September 21, 2024	August 16, 2025
Forever Young	October 21, 2024	February 21, 2025

=== 2025 ===
List of 2025 drama series, showing the premiere date and finale date
Title	Premiere	Finale
Mga Batang Riles	January 6, 2025	June 20, 2025
My Ilonggo Girl	January 13, 2025	March 20, 2025
Prinsesa ng City Jail	January 13, 2025	June 21, 2025
Binibining Marikit	February 10, 2025	June 27, 2025
Mommy Dearest	February 24, 2025	July 18, 2025
Slay	March 24, 2025	June 13, 2025
Encantadia Chronicles: Sang'gre	June 16, 2025	May 8, 2026
My Father's Wife	June 23, 2025	October 11, 2025
Sanggang-Dikit FR	June 23, 2025	January 30, 2026
Akusada	June 30, 2025	October 31, 2025
Beauty Empire	July 7, 2025	October 2, 2025
Cruz vs Cruz	July 21, 2025	January 17, 2026
Maka Lovestream	September 6, 2025	December 13, 2025
Hating Kapatid	October 13, 2025	March 21, 2026

=== 2026 ===
List of 2026 drama series, showing the premiere date and finale date
Title	Premiere	Finale
House of Lies	January 19, 2026	May 22, 2026
Never Say Die	February 2, 2026	May 22, 2026
Apoy sa Dugo	March 2, 2026	June 19, 2026
The Secrets of Hotel 88	March 2, 2026	June 26, 2026
Born to Shine	March 23, 2026	—N/a
The Master Cutter	May 11, 2026	—N/a
Kamao	May 25, 2026	October 16, 2026
Taskforce Firewall	May 25, 2026	—N/a
You're My Favorite Song	June 22, 2026	July 31, 2026
Delivery Boi	October 19, 2026	—N/a

== Upcoming ==
- A Million Dreams
- A Mother's Tale (2026)
- Code Gray (2026)
- Hari ng Tondo (2026)
- Pangarap na Ginto (2026)
- Whispers from Heaven (2026)

== Unaired ==
- Boys Over Flowers
- Captain Barbell Meets Darna
- Familia de Honor
- Haram
- L.U.V. Pow
- Mrs. Snow White
- Rosang Agimat
- Sine Novela's Ang Pinakamagandang Hayop sa Balat ng Lupa
- Sine Novela's Bakit Kay Tagal ng Sandali?
- Sine Novela's Muling Buksan ang Puso

== See also ==
- List of Philippine drama series
