= List of Philippine drama series =

The following is a list of Philippine drama series (also known as teleserye, Filipino telenovelas or P-drama) that aired on Philippine television.

== 2026 ==
Television series	Original network	Status	Total no. of episodes	Notes
Born to Shine	GMA Network	On-going	–	
Delivery Boi	GMA Network	On-going	–	
Mommy Guard	TV5	On-going	80	
Sigabo	Kapamilya Channel	On-going	–	
Someone, Someday	Kapamilya Channel	On-going	90	Advance episodes on Netflix and iWant.
Taskforce Firewall	GMA Network	On-going	–	
The Loyalty Game: Level Up	Kapamilya Channel	On-going	–	Amazon Prime Video has 14 episodes.
The Master Cutter	GMA Network	On-going	175	Advance episodes on Netflix.
A Million Dreams	GMA Network	Upcoming	–	
A Mother's Tale	GMA Network	Upcoming	–	
Athena	TV5	Upcoming	–	
Code Gray	GMA Network	Upcoming	–	
Glow Up	TV5	Upcoming	–	
Hari ng Tondo	GMA Network	Upcoming	–	
Lods	TV5	Upcoming	–	
Magic Boys	TV5	Upcoming	–	
Pangarap na Ginto	GMA Network	Upcoming	–	
The Good Doctor	TV5	Upcoming	–	Based on the 2013 Korean series Good Doctor.
Whispers from Heaven	GMA Network	Upcoming	–	
Wifi Family	TV5	Upcoming	–	
A Secret in Prague	TV5	Completed	115	With advance episodes on Netflix.
Apoy sa Dugo (The Sisters' Game)	GMA Network	Completed	78	
Blood vs Duty	Kapamilya Channel	Completed	80	With advance episodes on Netflix and iWant.
House of Lies	GMA Network	Completed	88	
Kamao (In His Corner)	GMA Network	Completed	104	
My Bespren Emman	TV5	Completed	120	
Never Say Die	GMA Network	Completed	78	
The Alibi: Ang Buong Katotohanan	Kapamilya Channel	Completed	93	Amazon Prime Video has 14 episodes.
The Secrets of Hotel 88	GMA Network	Completed	83	iWant releases first, 7 days before actual release date.
You're My Favorite Song	GMA Network	Completed	29	

== 2025 ==
Television series	Original network	Status	Total no. of episodes	Notes
Akusada (Her Name was Carolina)	GMA Network	Completed	89	
Beauty Empire	GMA Network, Viu	Completed	52	Viu has only 44 episodes.
Binibining Marikit (Hello, Miss Beautiful)	GMA Network	Completed	100	
Cruz vs Cruz	GMA Network	Completed	138	
Encantadia Chronicles: Sang'gre	GMA Network	Completed	233	Spin-off to the 2016 Philippine television fantasy drama series Encantadia.
Hating Kapatid (Stolen Bonds)	GMA Network	Completed	129	
Incognito	Kapamilya Channel	Completed	128	With advance episodes on Netflix and iWant.
It's Okay to Not Be Okay	Kapamilya Channel	Completed	65	Based on the 2020 South Korean romantic comedy drama television series of the same name. With advance episodes on Netflix and iWant. Originally extended to 80 but pushed back to 65 episodes.
Lolong: Bayani ng Bayan (Crocodile Whisperer book 2)	GMA Network	Completed	102	
Maka: Lovestream	GMA Network	Completed	14	Spin-off to the 2024 teen musical drama series Maka.
Mga Batang Riles (The Railway Kids)	GMA Network	Completed	117	Based on the 1992 Philippine action drama film Jesus dela Cruz at ang mga Batang Riles.
Mommy Dearest	GMA Network	Completed	103	
My Father's Wife	GMA Network	Completed	96	
My Ilonggo Girl	GMA Network	Completed	40	
Para sa Isa't Isa	TV5	Completed	24	
Prinsesa ng City Jail (The Jailhouse Princess)	GMA Network	Completed	129	
Roja	Kapamilya Channel	Completed	80	With advance episodes on Netflix and iWant.
Sanggang-Dikit FR (Hearts on the Badge)	GMA Network	Completed	160	Based on a 1983 Philippine film Sanggang Dikit.
Saving Grace: The Untold Story	Kapamilya Channel	Completed	78	Based on the 2010 Japanese television drama series Mother.
Sins of the Father	Kapamilya Channel	Completed	110 (Note: 2 seasons)	With advance episodes on iWant.
Slay	GMA Network	Completed	48	Viu has only 40 episode.
Totoy Bato	TV5	Completed	252	Based on the graphic novel of the same title created by Carlo J. Caparas.
What Lies Beneath	Kapamilya Channel	Completed	118	With advance episodes on Netflix and iWant. Netflix and iWant has only 110 episodes. Originally 100 episodes but extended to 110 and then extended to 8 more for free TV only.

== 2024 ==
Television series	Original network	Status	Total no. of episodes	Notes
Ang Himala ni Niño	TV5	Completed	140	Spin-off to the 2021 Philippine television comedy drama series Niña Niño.
Asawa ng Asawa Ko (My Husband's Wife)	GMA Network	Completed	207	
Forever Young	GMA Network	Completed	90	
High Street	Kapamilya Channel	Completed	80	Sequel to the 2023 mystery drama series Senior High. With advance episodes on iWantTFC.
Lavender Fields	Kapamilya Channel	Completed	100	With advance episodes on Netflix and iWantTFC.
Lilet Matias: Attorney-at-Law	GMA Network	Completed	258	
Linlang: The Teleserye Version (Deceit)	Kapamilya Channel	Completed	103	The series was released on the streaming service Amazon Prime Video on October 5, 2023, with the first two episodes available immediately and the rest debuting on a weekly basis. It was also available for streaming via Kapamilya Online Live and iWantTFC.
Love. Die. Repeat.	GMA Network	Completed	53	
Lumuhod Ka Sa Lupa (Just Revenge)	TV5	Completed	273 (Note: 4 seasons)	Television adaptation.
Maka	GMA Network	Completed	40 (Note: 3 seasons)	
Makiling	GMA Network	Completed	83	
My Guardian Alien	GMA Network	Completed	65	
Padyak Princess	TV5	Completed	80	
Pamilya Sagrado (Sagrado)	Kapamilya Channel	Completed	110	With advance episodes on iWantTFC.
Pulang Araw (In the Arms of the Conqueror)	GMA Network	Completed	110	With advance episodes on Netflix.
Shining Inheritance	GMA Network	Completed	90	Based on the 2009 Korean drama series Brilliant Legacy.
Widows' War	GMA Network	Completed	145	

== 2023 ==
Television series	Original network	Status	Total no. of episodes	Notes
AraBella	GMA Network	Completed	78	
Black Rider	GMA Network	Completed	188	
Can't Buy Me Love	Kapamilya Channel	Completed	148	With advanced episodes on Netflix and iWantTFC originally extended to 150 episodes but pushed back to 148 episodes
Dirty Linen	Kapamilya Channel	Completed	153	With 12-episode exclusive cut were released on September 7, 2023 to Amazon Prime Video on 240 countries and territories worldwide.
For the Love	TV5	Completed	13	
FPJ's Batang Quiapo (Gangs of Manila)	Kapamilya Channel	Completed	799 (Note: 7 seasons)	Based on the 1986 action comedy film of the same title.
Hearts on Ice	GMA Network	Completed	68	
Kurdapya (Curdapia)	TV5	Completed	13	
Love Before Sunrise	GMA Network	Completed	70	With advanced episodes on Viu.
Magandang Dilag (Beautiful Revenge)	GMA Network	Completed	99	
Maging Sino Ka Man (Love the Way You Are)	GMA Network	Completed	40	Based on the 1991 Philippine film of the same title.
Mga Lihim ni Urduja	GMA Network	Completed	48	
Minsan pa Nating Hagkan ang Nakaraan	TV5	Completed	59	Television adaptation.
Nag-aapoy na Damdamin (Flames of Vengeance)	TV5	Completed	134	
Pira-Pirasong Paraiso (Broken Paradise)	TV5	Completed	161	
Royal Blood	GMA Network	Completed	70	
Senior High	Kapamilya Channel	Completed	105	First iWantTFC Original in a teleserye format.
Stolen Life	GMA Network	Completed	80	
Team A	TV5	Completed	27	
The Missing Husband	GMA Network	Completed	80	
The Rain In España	TV5	Completed	10	Based on the Wattpad novel University series - The Rain in España by Gwy Saludes.
The Seed of Love	GMA Network	Completed	79	
The Write One	GMA Network	Completed	39	With advanced episodes on Viu.
Unbreak My Heart	GMA Network	Completed	100	With advanced episodes on Viu and iWantTFC.
Underage	GMA Network	Completed	78	Television adaptation.
Voltes V: Legacy	GMA Network	Completed	90	Based on the Japanese anime television series Voltes V.

== 2022 ==
Television series	Original network	Status	Total no. of episodes	Notes
2 Good 2 Be True	Kapamilya Channel	Completed	130	
A Family Affair	Kapamilya Channel	Completed	95	
Abot-Kamay na Pangarap (Hands on the Dreams)	GMA Network	Completed	659	
Apoy sa Langit (Broken Promise)	GMA Network	Completed	105	
Artikulo 247 (Article 247)	GMA Network	Completed	63	
Bolera (Break Shot)	GMA Network	Completed	65	
Darna	Kapamilya Channel	Completed	130	Based on the fictional Philippine superheroine of the same name by Mars Ravelo.
False Positive	GMA Network	Completed	19	
First Lady	GMA Network	Completed	97	Sequel to the 2021 television romantic comedy drama series First Yaya.
Flower of Evil	Kapamilya Channel	Completed	32	A Viu Original adaptation.
Little Princess	GMA Network	Completed	73	
Lolong (Crocodile Whisperer)	GMA Network	Completed	65	
Love in 40 Days	Kapamilya Channel	Completed	110	
Love You Stranger	GMA Network	Completed	40	
Mano Po Legacy: Her Big Boss	GMA Network	Completed	50	All based on the Mano Po movie franchise produced by Regal Entertainment.
Mano Po Legacy: The Family Fortune	GMA Network	Completed	40	All based on the Mano Po movie franchise produced by Regal Entertainment.
Mano Po Legacy: The Flower Sisters	GMA Network	Completed	47	All based on the Mano Po movie franchise produced by Regal Entertainment.
Maria Clara at Ibarra (Maria Clara and Ibarra)	GMA Network	Completed	105	Based on the novels Noli Me Tángere and El Filibusterismo by José Rizal.
My Papa Pi	Kapamilya Channel	Completed	13	
Nakarehas na Puso	GMA Network	Completed	80	
Raising Mamay (Raising Mama)	GMA Network	Completed	70	
Raya Sirena	GMA Network	Completed	7	
Return to Paradise	GMA Network	Completed	70	
Start-Up PH	GMA Network	Completed	65	Based on the 2020 South Korean drama series Start-Up.
Suntok sa Buwan	TV5	Completed	65	
The Broken Marriage Vow	Kapamilya Channel	Completed	107	Based on the British drama series from BBC One, Doctor Foster. With episode online on Viu.
The Fake Life	GMA Network	Completed	79	
The Iron Heart	Kapamilya Channel	Completed	238	
Unica Hija	GMA Network	Completed	85	
What We Could Be	GMA Network	Completed	40	
Widows' Web	GMA Network	Completed	43	

== 2021 ==
Television series	Original network	Status	Total no. of episodes	Notes
Agimat ng Agila (The Eagle's Quest)	GMA Network	Completed	27	
Ang Dalawang Ikaw (The Other You)	GMA Network	Completed	60	
Babawiin Ko ang Lahat (All or Nothing)	GMA Network	Completed	63	
Di Na Muli	TV5	Completed	14	
Encounter	TV5	Completed	32	Philippine adaptation.
First Yaya (The First Nanny)	GMA Network	Completed	78	
Gen Z	TV5	Completed	13	
He's Into Her	Kapamilya Channel, IWantTFC	Completed	26	Based on the 2012 novel of the same name by Maxinejiji (Maxine Lat Calibuso). An iWantTFC original.
Heartful Café	GMA Network	Completed	40	
Huwag Kang Mangamba (Mysterious Destiny)	Kapamilya Channel	Completed	168	
I Left My Heart in Sorsogon	GMA Network	Completed	65	
Init sa Magdamag (When Love Burns)	Kapamilya Channel	Completed	105	
La Vida Lena	Kapamilya Channel	Completed	160	
Las Hermanas	GMA Network	Completed	60	
Legal Wives	GMA Network	Completed	80	
Marry Me, Marry You	Kapamilya Channel	Completed	95	
Nagbabagang Luha (Flames of Love)	GMA Network	Completed	72	Based on a 1988 Philippine film of the same title.
Niña Niño	TV5	Completed	202	
Owe My Love	GMA Network	Completed	76	
Sleepless: The Series	TV5	Completed	12	
The Lost Recipe	GMA News TV, GTV	Completed	52	
The World Between Us	GMA Network	Completed	75	
To Have & to Hold	GMA Network	Completed	60	
Viral Scandal	Kapamilya Channel	Completed	127	

== 2020 ==
Television series	Original network	Status	Total no. of episodes	Notes
24/7	ABS-CBN	Completed	4	
A Soldier's Heart	ABS-CBN, Kapamilya Channel	Completed	110	
Anak ni Waray vs. Anak ni Biday (Hidden Lies)	GMA Network	Completed	62	Television adaptation.
Ang sa Iyo ay Akin (The Law of Revenge)	Kapamilya Channel	Completed	155	
Ate ng Ate Ko (Sister of My Sister)	TV5	Completed	13	
Bagong Umaga (New Beginnings)	Kapamilya Channel	Completed	129	
Bella Bandida	TV5	Completed	6	
Bilangin ang Bituin sa Langit (Stars of Hope)	GMA Network	Completed	80	Based on a 1989 Philippine film of the same title.
Carpool	TV5	Completed	6	
Descendants of the Sun	GMA Network	Completed	65	Based on a 2016 South Korean television drama series of the same title.
I Got You	TV5	Completed	13	
Kaibigan: The Series	GMA Network	Completed	13	
Love of My Life	GMA Network	Completed	80	
Love Thy Woman	ABS-CBN, Kapamilya Channel	Completed	95	
Make It with You	ABS-CBN	Completed	45	
My Extraordinary	TV5	Completed	8	
Oh My Dad!	TV5	Completed	26	
Paano ang Pangako?	TV5	Completed	93	
Project Destination	GMA News TV	Completed	6	
Stay-In Love	TV5	Completed	46	
Walang Hanggang Paalam (Irreplaceable)	Kapamilya Channel	Completed	143	

== 2019 ==
Television series	Original network	Status	Total no. of episodes	Notes
Beautiful Justice	GMA Network	Completed	100	
Bihag (The Silent Thief)	GMA Network	Completed	98	
Dahil sa Pag-ibig (For Love or Money)	GMA Network	Completed	100	
Dragon Lady	GMA Network	Completed	117	
Hanggang sa Dulo ng Buhay Ko (Obsession)	GMA Network	Completed	78	
Hiram na Anak (Borrowed Embrace)	GMA Network	Completed	48	
Hiwaga ng Kambat	ABS-CBN	Completed	19	
Inagaw na Bituin (Written in the Stars)	GMA Network	Completed	68	
Kara Mia	GMA Network	Completed	92	
Love You Two	GMA Network	Completed	104	
Madrasta (A Place in Your Heart)	GMA Network	Completed	100	
Magkaagaw (Broken Faith)	GMA Network	Completed	160	
Nang Ngumiti ang Langit (Michaela)	ABS-CBN	Completed	147	
One of the Baes (My Crown Princess)	GMA Network	Completed	90	
Pamilya Ko (My Family)	ABS-CBN	Completed	135	
Parasite Island	ABS-CBN	Completed	13	
Prima Donnas	GMA Network	Completed	311	
Sahaya	GMA Network	Completed	122	
Sandugo (Fists of Fate)	ABS-CBN	Completed	125	
Sino ang Maysala? (Mea Culpa)	ABS-CBN	Completed	75	
Starla	ABS-CBN	Completed	70	
The Better Woman	GMA Network	Completed	65	
The General's Daughter	ABS-CBN	Completed	183	
The Gift	GMA Network	Completed	105	
The Haunted	ABS-CBN	Completed	10	
The Killer Bride	ABS-CBN	Completed	115	
TODA One I Love (To the One I Love)	GMA Network	Completed	53	

== 2018 ==
Television series	Original network	Status	Total no. of episodes	Notes
Amo	TV5	Completed	13	
Ang Forever Ko'y Ikaw (Close to You)	GMA Network	Completed	38	
Araw Gabi (The Secrets of El Paraiso)	ABS-CBN	Completed	120	Based on the Filipino pocket book novel El Paraiso by Martha Cecilia.
Asawa Ko, Karibal Ko (Silent Shadow)	GMA Network	Completed	114	
Asintado	ABS-CBN	Completed	187	
Bagani	ABS-CBN	Completed	118	
Cain at Abel (Color of My Blood)	GMA Network	Completed	65	
Contessa	GMA Network	Completed	147	
Halik (Betrayal)	ABS-CBN	Completed	183	
Hindi Ko Kayang Iwan Ka (Stay With Me)	GMA Network	Completed	132	
Ika-5 Utos (Revenge)	GMA Network	Completed	116	
Inday Will Always Love You (Happy Together)	GMA Network	Completed	100	
Kadenang Ginto (The Heiress)	ABS-CBN	Completed	348	
Kapag Nahati ang Puso (Broken Hearts)	GMA Network	Completed	80	
Los Bastardos	ABS-CBN	Completed	247	Based on the Filipino pocket book novel Cardinal Bastards by Vanessa and was inspired by Fyodor Dostoevsky's The Brothers Karamazov.
My Guitar Princess	GMA Network	Completed	50	
My Special Tatay (The Heart Knows)	GMA Network	Completed	150	
Ngayon at Kailanman (Now and Forever)	ABS-CBN	Completed	110	
Onanay (The Way to Your Heart)	GMA Network	Completed	160	
Pamilya Roces (Family Jewels)	GMA Network	Completed	50	
Playhouse	ABS-CBN	Completed	135	
Sana Dalawa ang Puso (Two Hearts)	ABS-CBN	Completed	163	
Sherlock Jr.	GMA Network	Completed	63	
Since I Found You	ABS-CBN	Completed	85	
Sirkus	GMA Network	Completed	13	
The Blood Sisters	ABS-CBN	Completed	132	
The Cure	GMA Network	Completed	65	
The One That Got Away	GMA Network	Completed	88	
The Stepdaughters	GMA Network	Completed	178	
Victor Magtanggol (Heart of Courage)	GMA Network	Completed	80	Inspired by Norse mythology.

== 2017 ==
Television series	Original network	Status	Total no. of episodes	Notes
A Love to Last	ABS-CBN	Completed	183	
D' Originals	GMA Network	Completed	60	
Destined to be Yours	GMA Network	Completed	63	
G.R.I.N.D. Get Ready It's a New Day	GMA Network	Completed	10	
Hanggang Saan (A Mother's Guilt)	ABS-CBN	Completed	108	
Haplos (Angela)	GMA Network	Completed	164	
I Heart Davao (My Sweet Heart)	GMA Network	Completed	40	
Ikaw Lang ang Iibigin (Forever My Love)	ABS-CBN	Completed	195	
Impostora	GMA Network	Completed	160	Based on the 1993 Philippine romantic drama movie Sa Isang Sulok Ng Pangarap.
Kambal, Karibal (Heart & Soul)	GMA Network	Completed	178	
La Luna Sangre	ABS-CBN	Completed	185	Sequel to the Horror-Fantasy Drama Series Imortal.
Legally Blind	GMA Network	Completed	93	
Meant to Be	GMA Network	Completed	118	
Mulawin vs. Ravena	GMA Network	Completed	85	Sequel to the Philippine television fantasy drama series Mulawin and the 2005 Philippine fantasy adventure film Mulawin: The Movie.
My Dear Heart	ABS-CBN	Completed	103	
My Korean Jagiya	GMA Network	Completed	105	
My Love from the Star	GMA Network	Completed	55	Based on a 2013 South Korean television series of the same title.
Pinulot Ka Lang sa Lupa (Envy)	GMA Network	Completed	53	Television adaptation.
Pusong Ligaw (Lost Hearts)	ABS-CBN	Completed	189	
Super Ma'am (My Teacher, My Hero)	GMA Network	Completed	95	
The Better Half	ABS-CBN	Completed	147	
The Good Son	ABS-CBN	Completed	143	
The Promise of Forever	ABS-CBN	Completed	55	
Wildflower	ABS-CBN	Completed	257	

== 2016 ==
Television series	Original network	Status	Total no. of episodes	Notes
Alyas Robin Hood (Bow of Justice)	GMA Network	Completed	190	Inspired by the English folk hero Robin Hood.
Ang Panday	TV5	Completed	42	Based on the fictional comic character of the same title.
Bakit Manipis ang Ulap?	TV5	Completed	48	Television adaptation.
Be My Lady	ABS-CBN	Completed	221	
Born for You	ABS-CBN	Completed	65	
Calle Siete	GMA Network	Completed	94	
Dolce Amore	ABS-CBN	Completed	137	
Encantadia	GMA Network	Completed	218	Based on the 2005 Philippine television fantasy drama series of the same title.
Hahamakin ang Lahat (Love and Defiance)	GMA Network	Completed	80	
Hanggang Makita Kang Muli (Until We Meet Again)	GMA Network	Completed	93	
Ika-6 na Utos (A Woman Scorned)	GMA Network	Completed	383	
Juan Happy Love Story	GMA Network	Completed	80	
Langit Lupa (Heaven and Earth)	ABS-CBN	Completed	108	
Magkaibang Mundo (My Secret Love)	GMA Network	Completed	84	
Magpahanggang Wakas (I'll Never Say Goodbye)	ABS-CBN	Completed	80	Based on the 1980 Philippine Drama Movie Kastilyong Buhangin.
My Super D	ABS-CBN	Completed	64	
Naku, Boss Ko!	GMA Network	Completed	8	
Oh, My Mama!	GMA Network	Completed	55	Television adaptation.
Once Again	GMA Network	Completed	59	
Poor Señorita	GMA Network	Completed	79	
Sa Piling ni Nanay (Ysabel)	GMA Network	Completed	164	
Sinungaling Mong Puso (Cruel Lies)	GMA Network	Completed	74	Television adaptation.
Someone to Watch Over Me	GMA Network	Completed	90	
That's My Amboy (My Superstar)	GMA Network	Completed	68	
The Greatest Love	ABS-CBN	Completed	163	
The Millionaire's Wife	GMA Network	Completed	72	
The Story of Us	ABS-CBN	Completed	77	
Till I Met You	ABS-CBN	Completed	105	
Trops	GMA Network	Completed	238	
Tubig at Langis (Broken Vows)	ABS-CBN	Completed	152	Television adaptation.
We Will Survive	ABS-CBN	Completed	97	
Wish I May	GMA Network	Completed	88	

== 2015 ==
Television series	Original network	Status	Total no. of episodes	Notes
All of Me	ABS-CBN	Completed	110	
And I Love You So	ABS-CBN	Completed	70	
Baker King	TV5	Completed	85	Based on the 2010 South Korean series King of Baking.
Beautiful Strangers	GMA Network	Completed	80	
Because of You	GMA Network	Completed	117	
Bridges of Love	ABS-CBN	Completed	103	
Buena Familia	GMA Network	Completed	159	
Dangwa	GMA Network	Completed	70	
Destiny Rose	GMA Network	Completed	130	
Doble Kara	ABS-CBN	Completed	381 (Note: 6 seasons)	
FlordeLiza	ABS-CBN	Completed	158	Based on a 1981 Philippine film of the same title.
FPJ's Ang Probinsyano (Brothers)	ABS-CBN	Completed	1,696 (Note: 9 seasons)	Based on the 1996 action film of the same title.
Healing Hearts	GMA Network	Completed	89	
Inday Bote	ABS-CBN	Completed	53	Based on the local comic book of the same title created by Pablo S. Gomez.
InstaDad	GMA Network	Completed	13	
Kailan Ba Tama ang Mali? (Ruins of Love)	GMA Network	Completed	63	Television adaptation.
Let the Love Begin	GMA Network	Completed	70	Based on the 2005 Philippine Romantic Drama Movie of the same title.
Little Nanay (Little Mommy)	GMA Network	Completed	93	
Marimar	GMA Network	Completed	100	Based on a 1994 Mexican television series of the same title.
My Fair Lady	TV5	Completed	65	Based on the 2009 South Korean television series of the same title.
My Faithful Husband	GMA Network	Completed	70	
My Mother's Secret	GMA Network	Completed	54	
Nasaan Ka Nang Kailangan Kita (Waiting for Love)	ABS-CBN	Completed	192	Television adaptation.
Nathaniel	ABS-CBN	Completed	115	
Ningning	ABS-CBN	Completed	125	
Oh My G!	ABS-CBN	Completed	133	
On the Wings of Love	ABS-CBN	Completed	145	
Once Upon a Kiss	GMA Network	Completed	83	
Pangako sa'Yo (The Promise)	ABS-CBN	Completed	190	Based on the 2000 television drama series of the same title.
Pari 'Koy (My Holy Bro)	GMA Network	Completed	118	
Pasión de Amor	ABS-CBN	Completed	194	Based on the 2003 Colombian telenovela Pasión de Gavilanes.
Princess in the Palace	GMA Network	Completed	187	
Second Chances (Another Chance)	GMA Network	Completed	83	
The Rich Man's Daughter	GMA Network	Completed	65	
Walang Iwanan	ABS-CBN	Completed	35	
You're My Home	ABS-CBN	Completed	98	

== 2014 ==
Television series	Original network	Status	Total no. of episodes	Notes
Ang Dalawang Mrs. Real (The Other Mrs. Reals)	GMA Network	Completed	80	
Ang Lihim ni Annasandra (The Secret of Annasandra)	GMA Network	Completed	88	
Bagito	ABS-CBN	Completed	85	Based on the Wattpad series of the same title by Noreen Capili.
Beki Boxer	TV5	Completed	68	
Carmela: Ang Pinakamagandang Babae sa Mundong Ibabaw	GMA Network	Completed	83	
Confessions of a Torpe	TV5	Completed	78	
Dading	GMA Network	Completed	79	
Dream Dad	ABS-CBN	Completed	103	
Dyesebel	ABS-CBN	Completed	87	Based on the local comic character by Mars Ravelo and 2008 romantic fantasy drama series of the same title.
Forevermore	ABS-CBN	Completed	148	
Hawak Kamay (Instant Dad)	ABS-CBN	Completed	90	
Hiram na Alaala (Memories of Love)	GMA Network	Completed	80	
Ikaw Lamang (No Greater Love)	ABS-CBN	Completed	162	
Ilustrado	GMA Network	Completed	20	Based on the life of Philippine hero José Rizal.
Innamorata	GMA Network	Completed	88	
Jasmine	TV5	Completed	9	
Kambal Sirena (Footsteps of a Mermaid)	GMA Network	Completed	78	
Mirabella	ABS-CBN	Completed	73	
Moon of Desire	ABS-CBN	Completed	98	
More Than Words	GMA Network	Completed	80	
My BFF	GMA Network	Completed	69	
My Destiny	GMA Network	Completed	80	
Niño	GMA Network	Completed	80	
Obsession	TV5	Completed	12	
Paraiso Ko'y Ikaw (My Paradise)	GMA Network	Completed	45	
Pure Love	ABS-CBN	Completed	93	Based on 2011 South Korean drama series 49 days.
Rhodora X	GMA Network	Completed	88	
Sa Puso ni Dok (Village Doctor)	GMA Network	Completed	6	
Sana Bukas Pa ang Kahapon (Tomorrow Belongs to Me)	ABS-CBN	Completed	85	Television adaptation.
Strawberry Lane	GMA Network	Completed	80	
The Borrowed Wife	GMA Network	Completed	88	
The Half Sisters	GMA Network	Completed	418	
The Legal Wife	ABS-CBN	Completed	98	
Trenderas	TV5	Completed	16	
Two Wives	ABS-CBN	Completed	110	Based on the 2009 South Korean drama series of the same title.
Yagit (Pushcart of Dreams)	GMA Network	Completed	203	Based on the 1983 drama series of the same title.

== 2013 ==
Television series	Original network	Status	Total no. of episodes	Notes
Adarna	GMA Network	Completed	80	Inspired by the Philippine epic Ibong Adarna.
Akin Pa Rin ang Bukas (Perfect Vengeance)	GMA Network	Completed	79	
Anna Karenina	GMA Network	Completed	80	Based on a 1996 Philippine television series of the same title.
Annaliza	ABS-CBN	Completed	215	Based on the 1980 Philippine television drama series of the same title.
Apoy sa Dagat (Raging Love)	ABS-CBN	Completed	102	
Bayan Ko (The Politician)	GMA News TV	Completed	7	
Binoy Henyo (Wonder Kid)	GMA Network	Completed	85	
Bukas na Lang Kita Mamahalin (Tomorrow Can Wait)	ABS-CBN	Completed	55	
Bukod Kang Pinagpala (Mother's Love)	GMA Network	Completed	82	
Cassandra: Warrior Angel	TV5	Completed	64	
Dormitoryo (The Dormitory)	GMA Network	Completed	13	
Dugong Buhay (Raging Blood)	ABS-CBN	Completed	123	Television adaptation.
For Love or Money	TV5	Completed	14	
Forever	GMA Network	Completed	63	
Galema: Anak ni Zuma	ABS-CBN	Completed	130	Based on the comic book Zuma created by Jim Fernandez and the 1987 Philippine film of the same name.
Genesis	GMA Network	Completed	55	
Got to Believe	ABS-CBN	Completed	140	
Home Sweet Home	GMA Network	Completed	64	
Honesto	ABS-CBN	Completed	100	Based on the 1940 Walt Disney Productions film Pinocchio.
Huwag Ka Lang Mawawala (Against All Odds)	ABS-CBN	Completed	50	
Indio	GMA Network	Completed	97	
Juan dela Cruz	ABS-CBN	Completed	188	
Kahit Konting Pagtingin (Just One Glance)	ABS-CBN	Completed	53	Television adaptation.
Kahit Nasaan Ka Man (Love Sonata)	GMA Network	Completed	40	
Kailangan Ko'y Ikaw (All for Love)	ABS-CBN	Completed	63	
Kakambal ni Eliana (Eliana's Twin)	GMA Network	Completed	93	
Katipunan (The Aggregation)	GMA Network	Completed	10	Based on the history of the Philippine society Katipunan.
Kidlat	TV5	Completed	83	
Little Champ	ABS-CBN	Completed	47	
Love & Lies	GMA Network	Completed	44	
Madam Chairman	TV5	Completed	100	
Maghihintay Pa Rin (Bitter Sweet Life)	GMA Network	Completed	79	
Magkano Ba ang Pag-ibig? (Wealth and Passion)	GMA Network	Completed	100	
Maria Mercedes	ABS-CBN	Completed	80	Based on the 1992 Mexican drama series of the same title.
May Isang Pangarap (There's a Dream)	ABS-CBN	Completed	83	
Mga Basang Sisiw (Lost Children)	GMA Network	Completed	110	Television adaptation.
Misibis Bay	TV5	Completed	45	
Muling Buksan ang Puso (If Only)	ABS-CBN	Completed	65	
Mundo Mo'y Akin (Deception)	GMA Network	Completed	122	
My Husband's Lover	GMA Network	Completed	94	
My Little Juan	ABS-CBN	Completed	85	Midquel to the action fantasy drama series Juan dela Cruz.
Never Say Goodbye	TV5	Completed	63	
Positive	TV5	Completed	13	
Prinsesa ng Buhay Ko (My Girl)	GMA Network	Completed	90	
Pyra: Babaeng Apoy (Pyra: Fire Woman)	GMA Network	Completed	70	
Titser (The Teacher)	GMA News TV	Completed	10	
Undercover	TV5	Completed	45	
Unforgettable	GMA Network	Completed	67	
Villa Quintana	GMA Network	Completed	153	Based on a 1995 Philippine television drama series of the same title.
With a Smile	GMA Network	Completed	65	

== See also ==
- Television in the Philippines
- Lists of television series by channel:
  - ABS-CBN original drama series
  - GMA Network original drama series
  - GMA News TV and GTV original drama series
  - TV5 original drama series
