= Kris Bernal =

Filipino actress (born 1989)

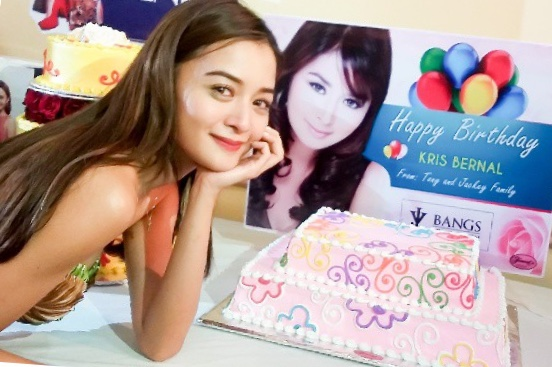
- Bernal in 2018
- Born: Kristine Ann Tan Bernal; May 17, 1989 (age 37); Quezon City, Philippines
- Occupation: Actress
- Years active: 2006–present
- Agent: Sparkle GMA Artist Center
- Height: 1.56 m (5 ft 1 in)
- Spouse: Perry Choi (m. 2021)
- Children: 1

Kristine Ann Tan "Kris" Bernal-Choi (born May 17, 1989) is a Filipino actress and businesswoman. who became known for winning the fourth season of the reality-based talent search StarStruck of GMA Network. Bernal rose to fame as the other half in her loveteam with Aljur Abrenica. After the loveteam ended, the latter continued to topbill soap operas.

== Early life and education ==
Kristine Ann Tan Bernal was born on May 17, 1989, in Quezon City, to Edgardo Bernal, an ethnic Tagalog and his Chinese wife, Analyn Tan. She has older twin sisters, Kathleen Ann and Katherine Ann and a younger brother named Miguel. She studied in Diliman Preparatory School and Holy Family School of Quezon City Inc. for her primary and secondary education. She took up nursing degree in Trinity University of Asia.

== Career ==
Bernal joined StarStruck in 2006 and won as the Ultimate Love Team with Mart Escudero. Bernal became part of different GMA Network shows including Boys Nxt Door, Zaido: Pulis Pangkalawakan, and Dyesebel. Although she started in showbiz with Escudero as her partner, Bernal garnered more attention when she was paired with present love team partner Aljur Abrenica. Bernal and Abrenica starred in their first afternoon series Sine Novela: Dapat Ka Bang Mahalin? in 2009 and a primetime drama series All My Life in the same year. Bernal has also appeared in the movie Mag-ingat Ka Sa... Kulam with Judy Ann Santos and Dennis Trillo. In 2010, Bernal appeared in The Last Prince as one of the main characters along with co-stars Aljur Abrenica and Bianca King, Kris played Lara Fernandez, a hapless poor provincial girl enslaved by her cruel aunt and cousin, she is Almiro's true love and Bambi's older sister, she was also the rival of the very bad and vicious fairy Diwani Bawana (played by Bianca King). Lara's life became miserable because of Diwani and Mayang's cruelties. After she played Lara, Bernal was cast as the leading lady of a Philippine television drama, Koreana, where she played Jennifer "Jenny" Jung/Jenna Bartolome Jung (Korean: 정제나), a very sensible and cheerful young woman. Aware of her Korean heritage, she acquaints herself with all things Korean, particularly their cuisine. And while in the midst of fulfilling her dream of becoming a chef, she unexpectedly ends up in a Korean restaurant, unwary that the place she works for is actually owned by Chang Hee Jung (played by Eddie Garcia) but she become opposed by Violeta Jung/Violeta Salcedo (played by Eula Valdez) and Ivy Jung.

=== Breakthrough roles ===
2011–2016

Bernal got a main role in 2011 on the TV show Machete. Bernal played the role of Jessa Ledesma/Jessa Romero, Machete's close friend. Right after Machete, she played a lead role in Time of My Life, a TV show in which she played the mean character Zaira Marquez.

She played a special role in Amaya as Adult Alunsina, the youngest among the alabays of the puod.

In 2012, she played a lead role in Hiram na Puso as Lira Banaag, a sweet and cheerful girl. A loving and obedient daughter of Zeny and Leo and Vanessa/Kara twin sister. Lira is raised with love and care by her mother, Zeny. Her fervent dream is to give her mother a comfortable life, that is why she strives hard to finish her studies. Unfortunately, she suffers from terrible heart condition and must undergoes heart transplant, an operation that will change, not only her old damage heart, but her whole life and the lives of the people around her, as well. At the end Lira dies from a hit & run accident. She was also opposed by Vanessa (played by Bela Padilla), a manipulative, ruthless and bitter woman who hates Lira as well.

The same year, Bernal played Andrea "Andy" Gomez in Coffee Prince, along with her love team Aljur Abrenica. Bernal played the lead role of the tomboyish girl who eventually falls in love with his boss, Arthur, who's unaware that she is actually a girl.

In 2013, she played another leading role in Prinsesa ng Buhay Ko, where she played Princess "Cess" Inocencio-Grande / Elizabeth Salazar a heroine who saved many people but become opposed by Kate Napoleon (played by LJ Reyes). After that she played Andrea "Andeng" Dizon again as the main character of Hiram na Alaala. She played the lead role of Tinay in Little Nanay who has an intellectual disability (ID).

In 2015 to 2016, she played various roles in Karelasyon, Dear Uge and Tadhana.

=== Villainous roles ===
2017–2019

In 2017, Bernal played the role as Nimfa/Rosette in Impostora (based on the 2007 primetime drama series of the same title, originally portrayed by Sunshine Dizon. Kris Bernal played two roles, the main villain Rosette who is a purely evil mother and a murderess who will kill just to achieve her needs. The other one is the main character Nimfa, a tragic woman but later she was tasked to do an evil scheme. This is Kris Bernal's first villain and dual role.

In 2018, she leads the show, Asawa Ko, Karibal Ko as the kind-hearted, Rachel who is the love interest of Gavin. In 2019 after becoming the lead actress in a show, Kris Bernal was cast as the lead antagonist in a horror-thriller show, Hanggang sa Dulo ng Buhay Ko as the evil spirit of the story who will destroy a two couple.

Bernal appeared on the cover of FHM Philippines' May 2017 issue.

2020

During the COVID-19 pandemic in the Philippines, her GMA Network and GMA Artist Center contracts expired which made Bernal a freelancer with no manager.

She starred as Marikit Gonzales in her first drama series outside GMA Network titled, Ate ng Ate Ko, along with Isabelle de Leon, Jake Cuenca and Joem Bascon, which was produced by APT Entertainment and aired on TV5 through a blocktime agreement.

Later in 2020, she temporarily joined Cornerstone Entertainment's roster of artists while remaining a freelance actress. However, in 2021, she transferred to ALV Talent Circuit.

In 2022, Bernal returns to the GMA's afternoon prime and is played the main antagonist role of Klaire Almazan-Gomez, an evil and gold-digger wife in drama suspense-thriller Artikulo 247.

== Personal life ==
Bernal got engaged to her longtime Chinoy boyfriend Perry Choi on February 6, 2020. She met him while he helped her set up a restaurant. They got married on September 25, 2021, at the St. Alphonsus Mary de Liguori Parish in Magallanes, Makati.

On March 3, 2023, Bernal announced on her official Instagram account that she and her husband were expecting a child. She gave birth to a baby girl, Hailee Lucca, on August 15, 2023. The couple is constructing their family house.

== Filmography ==
=== Film ===
Year	Title	Role
2008	Loving You	Tonee Tienza
2008	Mag-ingat Ka Sa... Kulam	Maggie
2009	Nandito Ako Nagmamahal Sa'Yo	Stephanie Luzano
2011	Ang Panday 2	Alira Naswen
2012	Guni-Guni	Shirley
2019	KontrAdiksyon	Jessica Puyat
2023	Ten Little Mistresses	Diva

=== Television ===
Year	Title	Role
2006–2007	StarStruck: The Next Level	Herself
2007–2010	SOP Rules	Herself
2007–2008	Boys Nxt Door	Coffee
2007–2008	Zaido: Pulis Pangkalawakan	Amy Maltayra
2008	Mars Ravelo's Dyesebel	Sheila Mae Legaspi-Montemayor
2008–2009	Luna Mystika	Malou
2009	Sine Novela: Dapat Ka Bang Mahalin?	Myrna Ramos-Sanchez
2009	All My Life	Romina Estrella
2010	The Last Prince	Reyna Lara Fernandez
2010–2013	Party Pilipinas	Herself
2010	Love Bug: Wish Come True	Gella
2010–2011	Koreana	Jennifer "Jenny / Jenna" Bartolome-Jung
2011	Pablo S. Gomez's Machete	Jessa Ledesma-Romero
2011	Time of My Life	Lisette / Shane
2012	Amaya	Adult Alunsina
2012	Hiram na Puso	Lira Banaag†
2012	Coffee Prince	Andrea "Andy" Gomez
2013–2015	Sunday All Stars	Herself
2013–2014	Prinsesa ng Buhay Ko	Princess "Cess" Inocencio / Elizabeth Salazar
2014–2015	Hiram na Alaala	Andrea "Andeng" Dizon
2015	Maynila: Christmas In My Heart	Milda
2015	Maynila: Dead na Dead Sayo	Sam
2015	Maynila: Copy Cat Love	Helena
2015	Karelasyon: Instant Baby	Lily
2015	Karelasyon: Karma	Monique / Anna
2015	StarStruck VI	Herself / Host
2015	Wagas: Kulam at Pag-ibig	Jonalyn
2015–2016	Little Nanay	Celestina "Tinay" Batongbuhay-San Pedro
2016	Karelasyon: Yaya	Sara
2016	Dear Uge: 'Till Death Do Us Apart	Cynthia
2017	Road Trip	Herself / Guest
2017	Tadhana	Elvira "Elvie"
2017–2018	Impostora	Nimfa del Prado-Saavedra / Rosario Margaret "Rosette" R. Cuevas†
2018	The Cure	Myra
2018–2019	Asawa Ko, Karibal Ko	Chef Rachel Santiago-Bravante
2019	Hanggang sa Dulo ng Buhay Ko	Naomi Espiritu†
2020	Imbestigador: Freezer	Joanna Demafelis
2020	Wish Ko Lang: Kutob	Jerlyn
2020–2021	Ate ng Ate Ko	Marikit "Riki" Gonzalez
2021	Owe My Love	Young Melissa Alcancia
2022	Artikulo 247	Carmen Borromeo / Klaire Almazan-Gomez†
2022	Dear God	
2025	Tadhana: Abo ng Kahapon	Elaine
2025	Sanggang-Dikit FR	Mrs. Enriquez†
2026	House of Lies	Althea "Thea" Villareal-Torrecampo†
2026–present	TiktoClock	Co-Host (Herself)

== Discography ==
Year	Title	Album	With	Label	Theme From
2015	Kasama Kita	N/A	Chlaui Malayao	GMA Records	Little Nanay
