= Bayan Ko (TV series) =

2013 Philippine television drama series

- Title card
- Also known as: The Politician
- Genre: Political drama
- Developed by: Nessa Valdellon
- Written by: Nessa Valdellon; Rodolfo Vera
- Directed by: Adolfo Alix, Jr.
- Starring: Rocco Nacino
- Theme music composer: Constancio de Guzmán
- Opening theme: "Bayan Ko" by Johnoy Danao
- Country of origin: Philippines
- Original language: Tagalog
- No. of episodes: 7

Production
- Producer: Eliza Zamora Solis
- Cinematography: Albert Banzon
- Camera setup: Multiple-camera setup
- Running time: 35–46 minutes
- Production company: GMA News and Public Affairs

Original release
- Network: GMA News TV
- Release: March 10 – April 21, 2013

Bayan Ko (transl. my town / international title: The Politician) is a 2013 Philippine television drama series broadcast by GMA News TV. Directed by Adolfo Alix, Jr., it stars Rocco Nacino. It premiered on March 10, 2013. The series concluded on April 21, 2013, with a total of seven episodes.

The series is streaming online on YouTube.

== Premise ==
Lagros' newly elected mayor, Joseph Santiago, discovers that a bunch of wayward employees have turned the municipal hall into a boarding house and, worse, have been making under the table deals. His efforts to fight corruption are blocked by a political dynasty led by Governor Antonio Rubio and Congressman Anton Rubio.

== Cast and characters ==
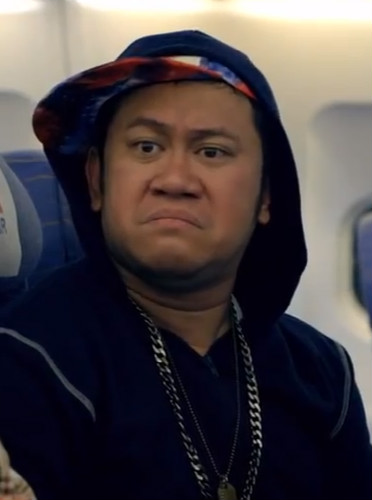
Betong Sumaya portrays Betong.

Lead cast

- Rocco Nacino as Joseph Santiago

Supporting cast

- Pen Medina as Antonio Rubio
- Ping Medina as Anton Rubio
- LJ Reyes as Karen Canlas
- Angeli Bayani as Nena Santiago
- Ma. Isabel Lopez as Sylvia Rubio
- Betong Sumaya as Betong
- Mercedes Cabral as Eliza Bauer
- Love Añover as Liway

Recurring cast

- Bembol Roco as Ernesto Santiago
- Cecille Adefuin as Ophie
- Simon Ibarra as the chief of police

== Episodes ==
Episodes of Bayan Ko
| No. | Title | Original release date |
|---|---|---|
| 1 | "Inherited Problems" | March 10, 2013 |
| 2 | "Corruption" | March 17, 2013 |
| 3 | "Education" | March 24, 2013 |
| 4 | "Jueteng" | March 31, 2013 |
| 5 | "Illegal Logging" | April 7, 2013 |
| 6 | "The Aftermath" | April 21, 2013 |

== Accolades ==
Accolades received by Bayan Ko
| Year | Award | Category | Recipient | Result | Ref. |
|---|---|---|---|---|---|
| 2013 | 12th Quill Awards | Quill Award for Excellence | Bayan Ko | Won | |
| 2013 | 35th Catholic Mass Media Awards | Best Drama Series | Bayan Ko | Won | |
| 2013 | 27th PMPC Star Awards for Television | Best Supporting Actor | Pen Medina | Nominated | |
| 2014 | Golden Screen TV Awards | Outstanding Original Drama Program | Bayan Ko | Nominated | |
| 2014 | Golden Screen TV Awards | Outstanding Performance by an Actor in a Drama Series | Rocco Nacino | Nominated | |
| 2014 | Golden Screen TV Awards | Outstanding Supporting Actor in a Drama Program | Pen Medina | Nominated | |
