= The Last Prince =

2010 Philippine television drama series

- Title card
- Genre: Drama; Romantic fantasy
- Developed by: R.J. Nuevas
- Directed by: Mac Alejandre
- Starring: Aljur Abrenica; Kris Bernal
- Theme music composer: Tata Betita
- Opening theme: "Nang Dahil sa 'Yo Natutong Magmahal" by Julie Anne San Jose
- Country of origin: Philippines
- Original language: Tagalog
- No. of episodes: 117

Production
- Executive producer: Winnie Hollis-Reyes
- Camera setup: Multiple-camera setup
- Running time: 20–39 minutes
- Production company: GMA Entertainment TV

Original release
- Network: GMA Network
- Release: January 11 – June 25, 2010

The Last Prince is a 2010 Philippine television drama romance fantasy series broadcast by GMA Network. Directed by Mac Alejandre, it stars Aljur Abrenica in the title role and Kris Bernal. It premiered on January 11, 2010, on the network's Telebabad line up. The series concluded on June 25, 2010, with a total of 117 episodes.

The series is streaming online on YouTube.

== Cast and characters ==
Cast

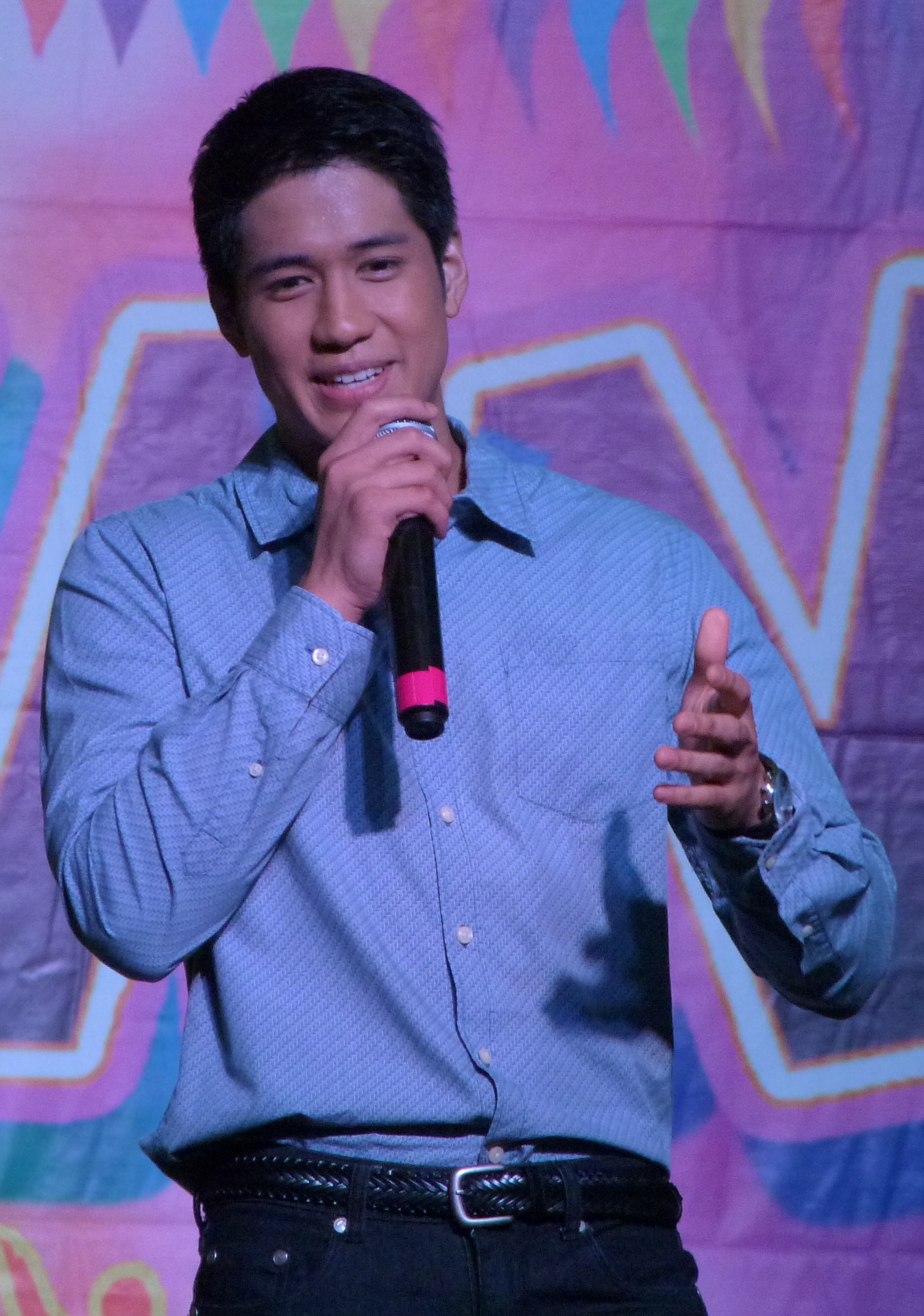
Aljur Abrenica

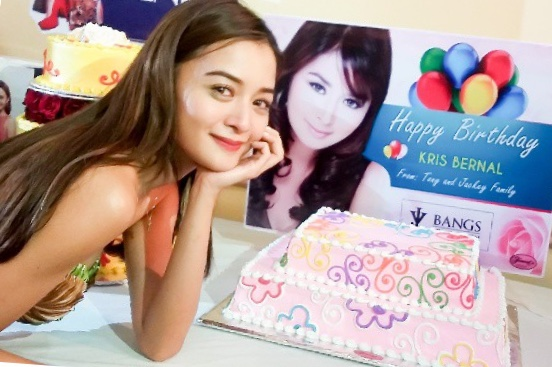
Kris Bernal

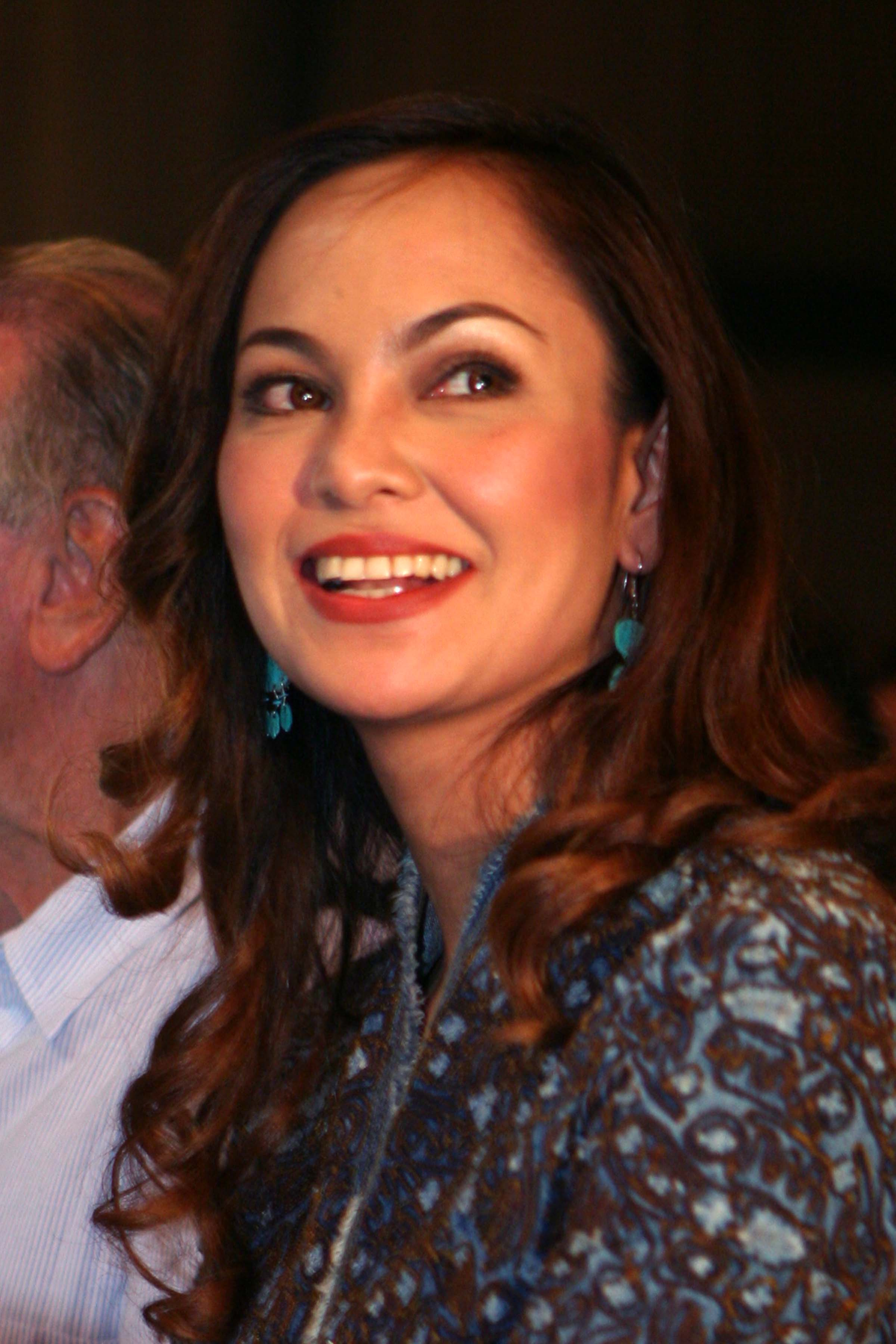
Eula Valdez

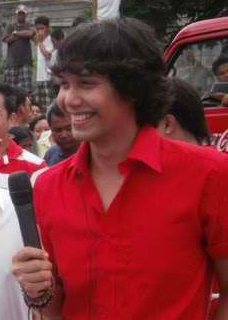
Paolo Ballesteros

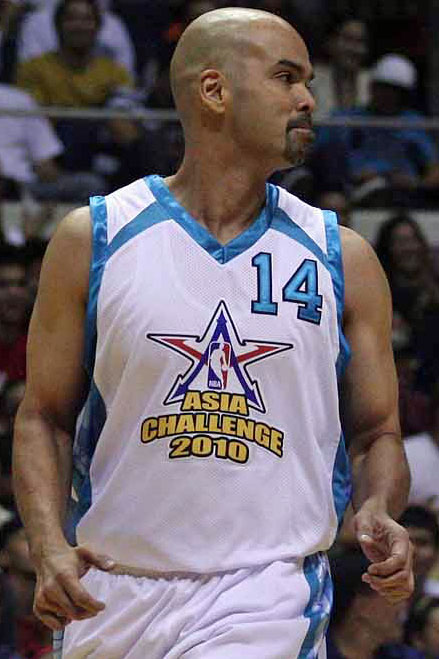
Benjie Paras

Lead cast

- Aljur Abrenica as Almiro
- Kris Bernal as Lara Fernandez

Supporting cast

- Bianca King as Bawana
- Eula Valdez as Adela
- Angelu de Leon as Mayang
- Carmina Villarroel as Lamara
- Emilio Garcia as Adorno
- Chanda Romero as Rosata
- Chynna Ortaleza as Lourdez
- Bubbles Paraiso as Saraya
- Paolo Ballesteros as Anexi
- Benjie Paras as Rizayo
- Elvis Gutierrez as Guwarko
- Joey Paras as Salim Salamin
- Francis Magundayao as Onuro
- Karen delos Reyes as Minnie
- Angeli Nicole Sanoy as Bambi
- Rita Iringan as Gigi

Guest cast

- Daniel Matsunaga as Prince Nikolai
- Carl Guevarra as Jerrick Santella
- Jay Manalo as Carlos Ledesma
- Jhoana Marie Tan as teen Bambi
- Mosang as Uruja
- Dang Cruz as Goray
- Jan Manual as Harold
- Maybelyn dela Cruz as Diwani Ogyna
- Jenny Miller as Dominique
- Stef Prescott as Naveya
- Patani as Bina
- Sherilyn Reyes-Tan as Cicit
- Jan Marini as Josie
- Gene Padilla as Sintoy
- Jillian Ward as Daldanika
- Jace Flores as a town bully
- Kiel Rodriguez as a town bully
- Dex Quindoza as a town bully
- Princess Punzalan as Alwana
- Geoff Eigenmann as Javino Perez
- Carla Abellana as Sonia

== Production ==
Principal photography commenced on November 5, 2009.

== Ratings ==
According to AGB Nielsen Philippines' Mega Manila household television ratings, the pilot episode of The Last Prince earned a 30.9% rating.
