= Time of My Life (Philippine TV series) =

2011 Philippine television drama series

- Title card
- Genre: Drama
- Developed by: Senedy Que
- Directed by: Mark A. Reyes V; Andoy Ranay
- Starring: Mark Herras; Kris Bernal
- Opening theme: "(I've Had) the Time of My Life" by Kris Lawrence and Julie Anne San Jose
- Country of origin: Philippines
- Original language: Tagalog
- No. of episodes: 80

Production
- Executive producer: Juel Balbon
- Camera setup: Multiple-camera setup
- Running time: 30–45 minutes
- Production company: GMA Entertainment TV

Original release
- Network: GMA Network
- Release: August 1 – November 18, 2011

Time of My Life is a 2011 Philippine television drama dance series broadcast by GMA Network. Directed by Mark A. Reyes V and Andoy Ranay, it stars Mark Herras and Kris Bernal. It premiered on August 1, 2011 on the network's Telebabad line up. The series concluded on November 18, 2011, with a total of 80 episodes.

== Cast and characters ==
Cast

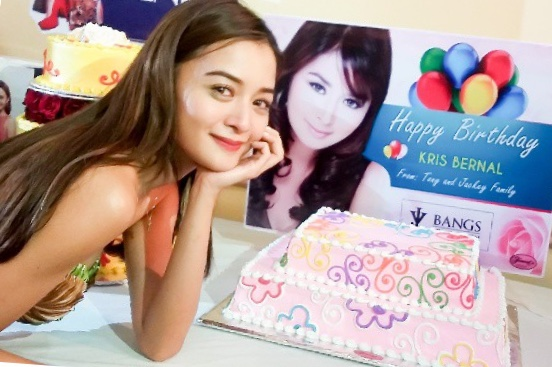
Kris Bernal

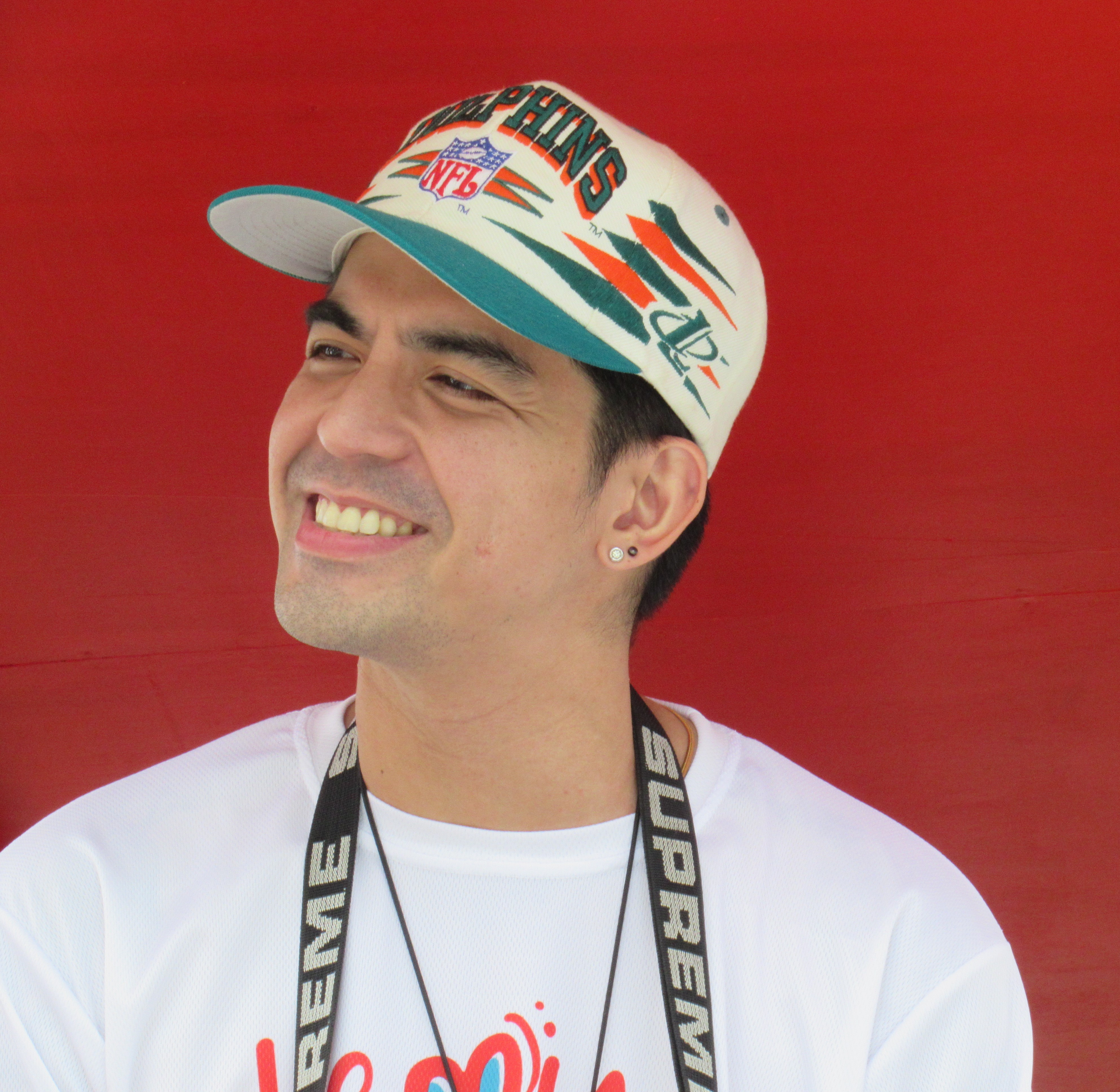
Mark Herras

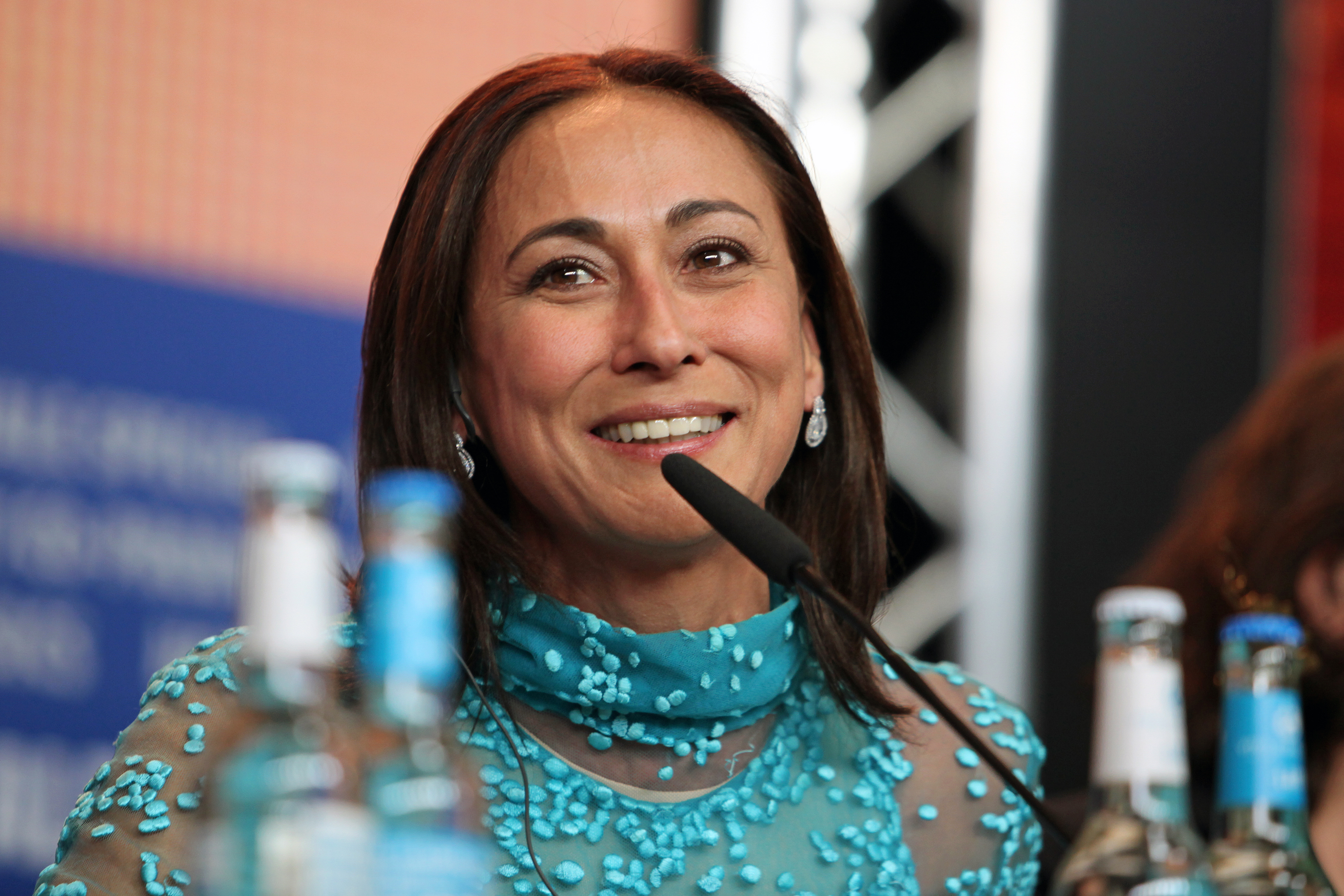
Cherie Gil

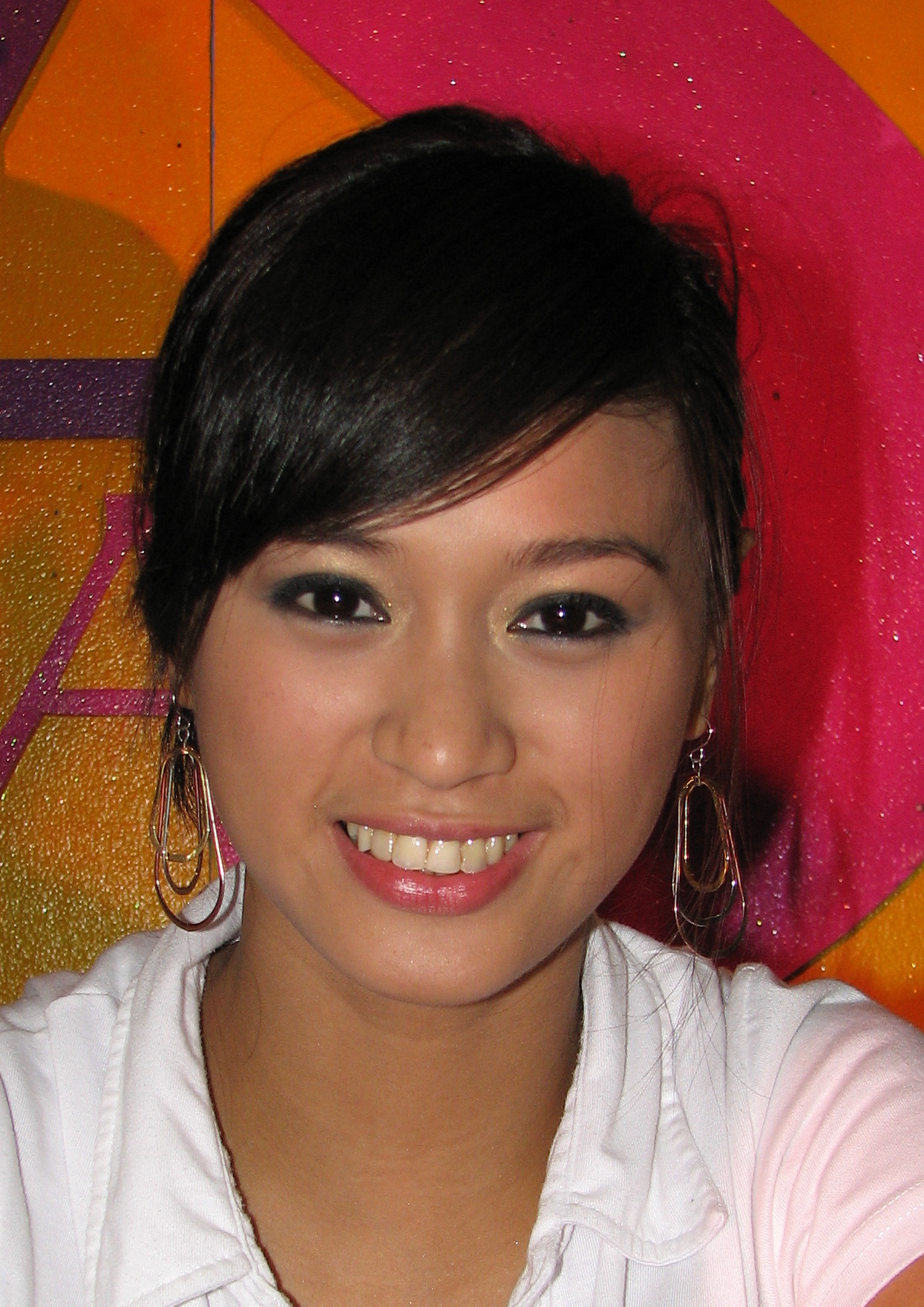
Jopay

Lead cast

- Kris Bernal as Shane / Lizette
- Mark Herras as Patrick

Supporting cast

- Rocco Nacino as Jason
- LJ Reyes as Zaira
- Jean Garcia as Lisa
- Raymond Bagatsing as Fred
- Cherie Gil as Martha
- Emilio Garcia as Gregory
- Caridad Sanchez as Becky
- Rez Cortez as Douglas
- Tanya Gomez as Carlotta
- Samantha Lopez as Lucinda
- Joshua Zamora as Mario
- Geleen Eugenio as Janet
- Ronnie Henares as Vernon
- Jopay as Darleen
- Carl Acosta as Borggy

Guest cast

- Louise Bolton
- Sandy Tolentino
- Regine Tolentino as Shane
- Melissa Mendez as Ingrid
- Kyla as Elaine
- Jay R as Michael
- Pop Girls as Chinese dancers
- Down to Mars as Singaporean dancers
- XLR8 as Japanese dancers
- Lexi Fernandez as Jessica
- Lianne Valentin

=== Dance groups ===
Motion Masters

- Ryza Cenon as Rochelle
- Sef Cadayona as Harry
- Sarah Lahbati as Pia
- Mayton Eugenio as Amera
- Ken Chan as Rudolf
- Teejay Marquez as Chicho
- Renelee Asilum as Cynthia

Elite Crew

- Steven Silva as John
- Diva Montelaba as Lally
- Enzo Pineda as Donnie
- Yassi Pressman as Terry
- Myra Carel as Paula

== Development ==
The first danserye is based on original concept created for GMA Television by Senedy Que with head writer Des Garbes Severino, choreographers Miggy Tanchanco (modern) and Donald Balbuena (ballroom), and directors Mark Reyes (musicals) and Andoy Ranay (drama). In 2010, it was planned for a working title Jump. It was supposed to be replacing Tween Hearts, GMA Network decided to put it on the Primetime line up. The show was slated for 2011. Several auditions across the Philippines were held. The auditionees were seen in Party Pilipinas (until it was premiered in August 2011), with a working title Time of My Life.

== Ratings ==
According to AGB Nielsen Philippines' Mega Manila household television ratings, the pilot episode of Time of My Life earned a 24.7% rating. The final episode scored an 11.4% rating.

== Controversy ==
During filming of the series, actress Cherie Gil slapped the face of actress Jean Garcia, which was not part of the script. Gil stated she was "carried away", leading her to slap Garcia during their scene.
