= Hiram na Puso =

2012 Philippine television drama series

- Title card
- Also known as: A Change of Heart
- Genre: Drama
- Developed by: Suzette Doctolero
- Written by: Geng Delgado; Jules Katanyag
- Directed by: Andoy Ranay; Roderick Lindayag
- Creative director: Jun Lana
- Starring: Kris Bernal
- Theme music composer: Maya Meriales Manzanas; Gary Valenciano
- Opening theme: "Narito" by Kyla
- Country of origin: Philippines
- Original language: Tagalog
- No. of episodes: 88

Production
- Executive producer: Joseph Aleta
- Producer: Wilma Galvante
- Production locations: Manila, Philippines
- Cinematography: Juan Lorenzo Orendain III
- Camera setup: Multiple-camera setup
- Running time: 30–45 minutes
- Production company: GMA Entertainment TV

Original release
- Network: GMA Network
- Release: March 5 – July 6, 2012

Hiram na Puso (transl. borrowed heart / international title: A Change of Heart) is a 2012 Philippine television drama series broadcast by GMA Network. Directed by Andoy Ranay and Roderick Lindayag, it stars Kris Bernal. It premiered on March 5, 2012 on the network's Afternoon Prime line up. The series concluded on July 6, 2012, with a total of 88 episodes.

== Cast and characters ==
Cast

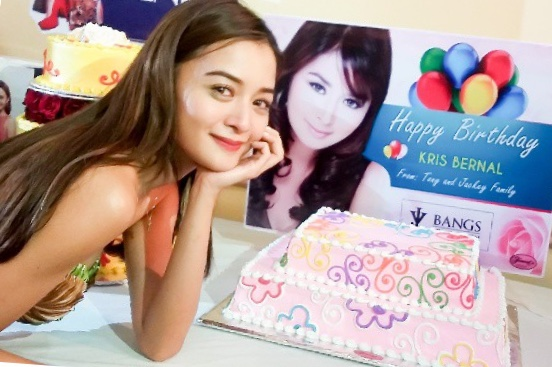
Kris Bernal

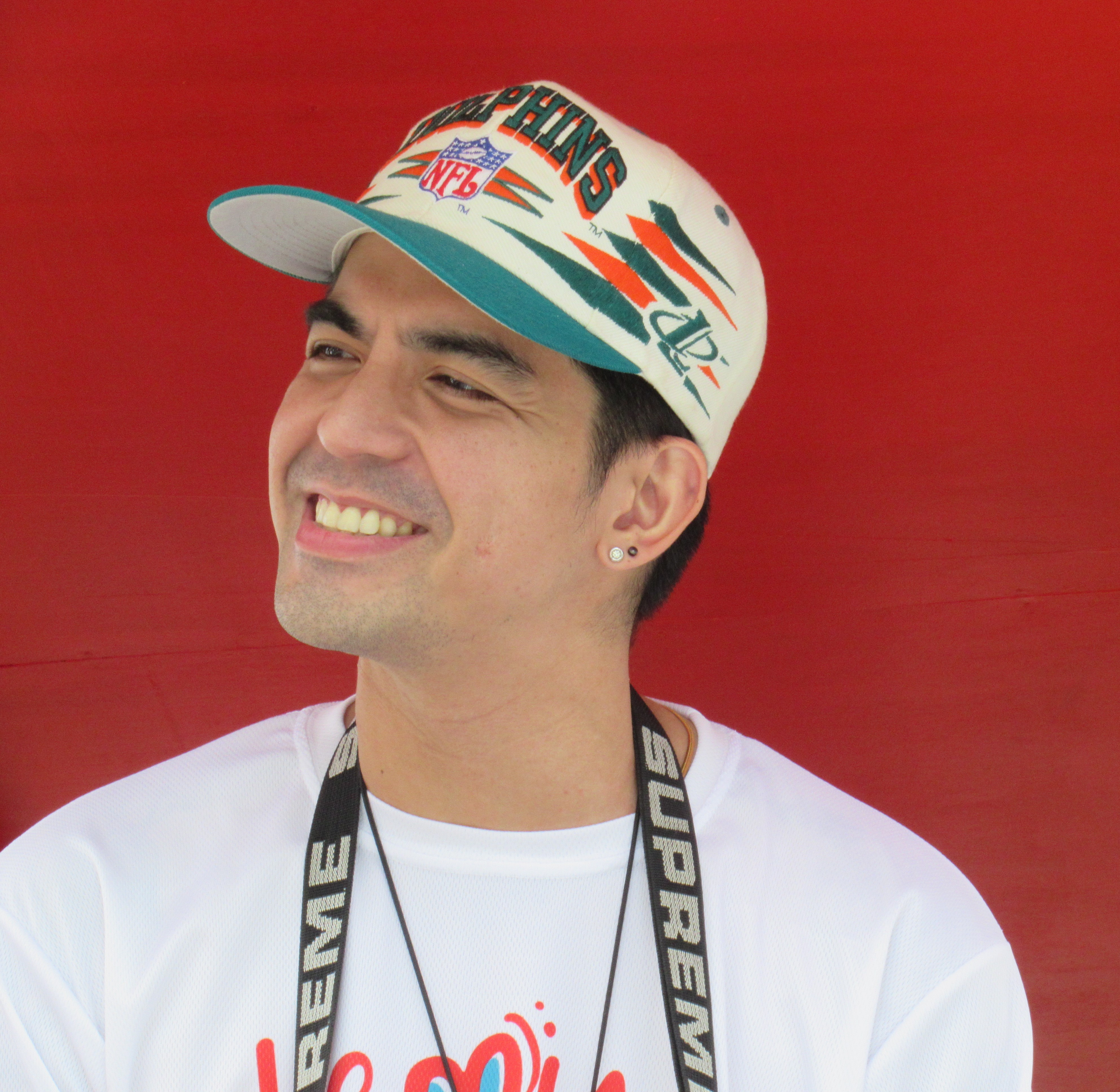
Mark Herras

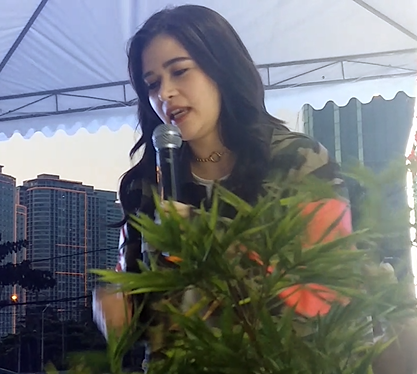
Bela Padilla

Lead cast

- Kris Bernal as Lira Banaag

Supporting cast

- Mark Herras as Prince
- Gina Alajar as Zeny Banaag
- Gardo Versoza as Leo Saavedra
- Ayen Munji-Laurel as Roxanne Saavedra
- Bela Padilla as Vanessa Saavedra / Kara Banaag
- Polo Ravales as Dennis
- Krystal Reyes as Angeline Saavedra
- Candy Pangilinan as Becky
- Wynwyn Marquez as Jillian
- Ana Marin as Chona
- Marc Acueza as Choy

Guest cast

- Ehra Madrigal as young Becky
- Stef Prescott as younger Zeny
- Renz Valerio as younger Prince
- Angie Ferro as a patient

== Ratings ==
According to AGB Nielsen Philippines' Mega Manila household television ratings, the pilot episode of Hiram na Puso earned a 6.6% rating. The final episode scored a 20.7% rating.

== Accolades ==
Accolades received by Hiram na Puso
Year	Award	Category	Recipient	Result	Ref.
2014	Golden Screen TV Awards	Outstanding Performance by an Actress in a Drama Series	Gina Alajar	Nominated	
