= Ate ng Ate Ko =

Philippine drama television series

- Title card
- Genre: Family drama; Romance
- Directed by: Linnet Zurbano
- Starring: Kris Bernal; Isabelle de Leon; Jake Cuenca; Joem Bascon
- Opening theme: "Ika'y Mamahalin" by Trisha Denise
- Country of origin: Philippines
- Original language: Tagalog
- No. of episodes: 13

Production
- Camera setup: Single-camera
- Production companies: Archangel Media Inc.; Cignal Entertainment

Original release
- Network: TV5
- Release: November 23, 2020 – February 15, 2021

Ate ng Ate Ko (transl. sister of my sister) is a Philippine television drama series broadcast by TV5. Directed by Linnet Zurbano, it stars Kris Bernal and Isabelle de Leon. The series premiered on November 23, 2020, on the network's Primetime Todo evening block, and aired every Mondays until its final episode on February 15, 2021.

== Plot ==
After they become orphan in a young age, Riki (Kris Bernal) raised her younger sibling Yumi (Isabelle de Leon). However due to an incident, their world turned upside down. Will Yumi be able to be a responsible sister to her sister?

== Cast and characters ==
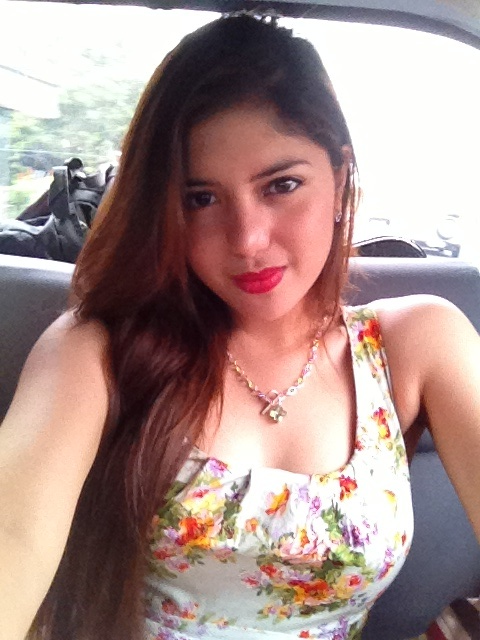
Isabelle de Leon portrays as Mayumi Gonzalez

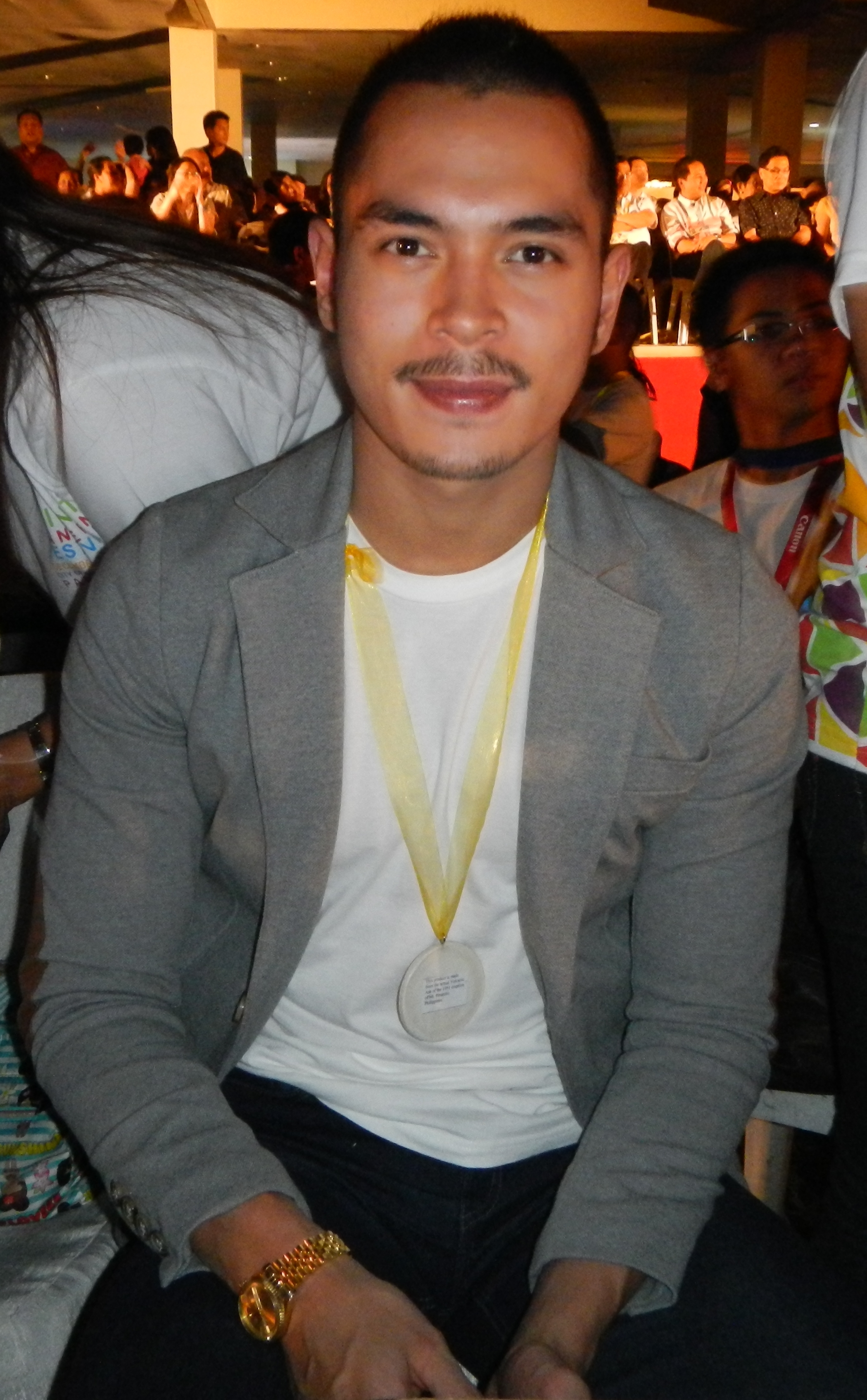
Jake Cuenca portrays as Marco Toledo

Lead cast

- Kris Bernal as Atty. Marikit "Riki" Gonzalez
- Isabelle de Leon as Mayumi "Yumi" Gonzalez
- Jake Cuenca as Marco Toledo
- Joem Bascon as Dr. Frank Sevilla

Supporting cast

- Tonton Gutierrez as Alberto Toledo
- Kim Last as Patrick Sevilla
- Phil Noble as Tope
- Jervy "Patani" Daño as Char
- Pinky Aseron as Judge Emily
- Jordan Hong as Heindrich

Guest cast

- Yayo Aguila as Mithi Gonzalez
- Rey Abellana as Ludovic Gonzalez
