= Babawiin Ko ang Lahat =

2021 Philippine television drama series

- Title card
- Also known as: All or Nothing
- Genre: Drama
- Created by: R.J. Nuevas; Glaiza Ramirez
- Written by: Glay Ramirez; Jason John Lim; Patrick Ilagan; Meryl Bunyi; Ana Aleta Nadela; Christine Novicio
- Directed by: Jules Katanyag
- Creative director: Aloy Adlawan
- Starring: Pauline Mendoza
- Opening theme: "Para sa' Yo" by Pauline Mendoza
- Country of origin: Philippines
- Original language: Tagalog
- No. of episodes: 63

Production
- Executive producers: Nieva Sabit-Magpayo; Leilani Sandoval
- Camera setup: Multiple-camera setup
- Running time: 30–34 minutes
- Production company: GMA Entertainment Group

Original release
- Network: GMA Network
- Release: February 22 – May 21, 2021

Babawiin Ko ang Lahat (transl. I will retrieve everything / international title: All or Nothing) is a 2021 Philippine television drama series broadcast by GMA Network. Directed by Jules Katanyag, it stars Pauline Mendoza. It premiered on February 22, 2021, on the network's Afternoon Prime line up. The series concluded on May 21, 2021, with a total of 63 episodes.

The series is streaming online on YouTube.

== Cast and characters ==
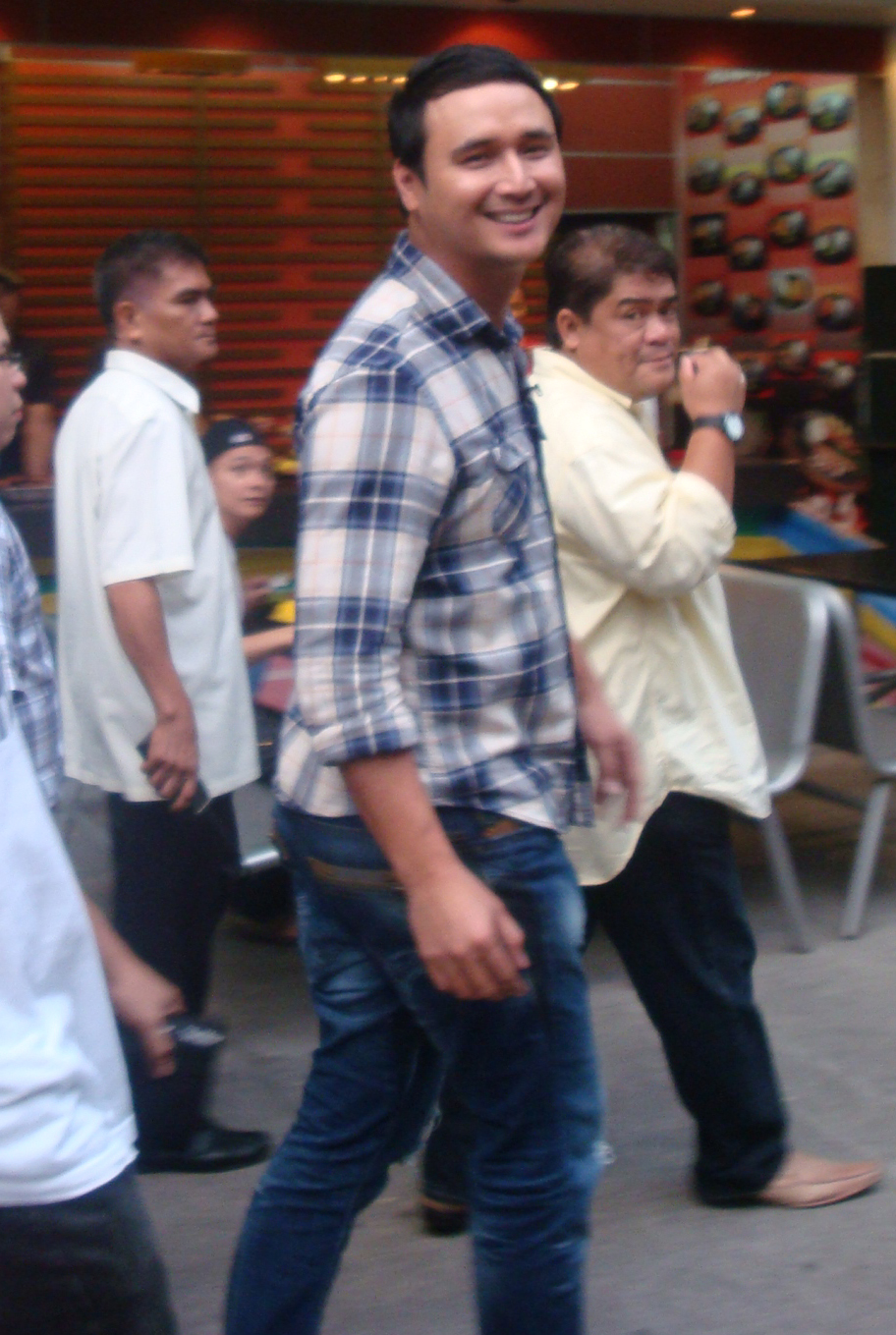
John Estrada portrays Victor Salvador.

Lead cast

- Pauline Mendoza as Iris Allegre-Salvador

Supporting cast

- John Estrada as Victor Salvador
- Carmina Villarroel as Dulce Espejo / Dulce Salvador
- Tanya Garcia as Christine Allegre-Salvador
- Liezel Lopez as Katrina "Trina" Espejo / Katrina "Trina" Salvador
- Kristoffer Martin as Joel Espejo-Salvador
- Dave Bornea as Randall Madrigal
- Therese Malvar as Lalaine "Lala" Vasquez
- Manolo Pedrosa as Justin Roxas
- Tanya Gomez as Menchie Salvador
- Gio Alvarez as Greg Madrigal

Guest cast

- Neil Ryan Sese as Jun Roxas
- Jett Pangan as Akira Tanaka
- Charee Pineda as Minnie Cruz
- Jenine Desiderio as Elena Allegre
- Mirriam Manalo as Ada

== Production ==
Principal photography commenced in November 2020.

== Ratings ==
According to AGB Nielsen Philippines' Nationwide Urban Television Audience Measurement People in television homes, the pilot episode of Babawiin Ko ang Lahat earned a 10.4% rating. The final episode scored a 9.6% rating.

== Accolades ==
Accolades received by Babawiin Ko ang Lahat
Year	Award	Category	Recipient	Result	Ref.
2023	35th PMPC Star Awards for Television	Best Daytime Drama Series	Babawiin Ko ang Lahat	Nominated	
2023	35th PMPC Star Awards for Television	Best Drama Supporting Actor	John Estrada	Won	
2023	35th PMPC Star Awards for Television	Best Drama Supporting Actor	Kristofer Martin	Nominated	
2023	35th PMPC Star Awards for Television	Best Drama Supporting Actress	Carmina Villarroel	Nominated	
