= Artikulo 247 =

2022 Philippine television drama series

- Title card
- Also known as: Article 247
- Genre: Legal drama; Crime
- Created by: Des Garbes-Severino
- Written by: Des Garbes-Severino; Benson Logronio; Jmee Katanyag; Brylle Tabora
- Directed by: Jorron Lee Monroy
- Creative director: Aloy Adlawan
- Starring: Rhian Ramos; Kris Bernal
- Theme music composer: Rina L. Mercado
- Opening theme: "Di Ba Sapat?" by Jennie Gabriel
- Country of origin: Philippines
- Original language: Tagalog
- No. of episodes: 63

Production
- Executive producer: Mavic Tagbo
- Cinematography: David Siat
- Editors: Benedict Lavastida; Rolando Dela Merced
- Camera setup: Multiple-camera setup
- Running time: 22–28 minutes
- Production company: GMA Entertainment Group

Original release
- Network: GMA Network
- Release: March 7 – June 3, 2022

Artikulo 247 (transl. / international title: Article 247) is a 2022 Philippine television drama legal crime series broadcast by GMA Network. Directed by Jorron Lee Monroy, it stars Rhian Ramos and Kris Bernal. It premiered on March 7, 2022, on the network's Afternoon Prime line up. The series concluded on June 3, 2022, with a total of 63 episodes.

The series is streaming online on YouTube.

== Premise ==
The show features a frustrated homicide victim, with her assailant getting away due to Article 247 of Revised Penal Code. She will later encounter her attacker again, leading her to fight for justice.

== Cast and characters ==
Cast

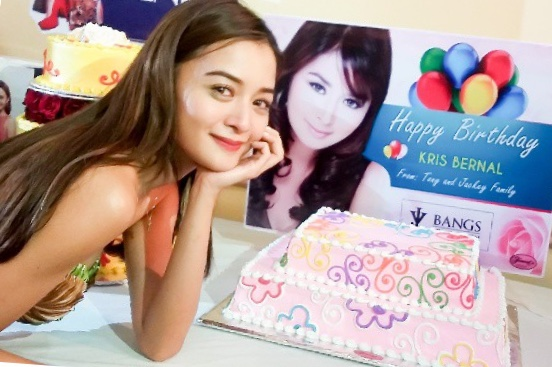
Kris Bernal

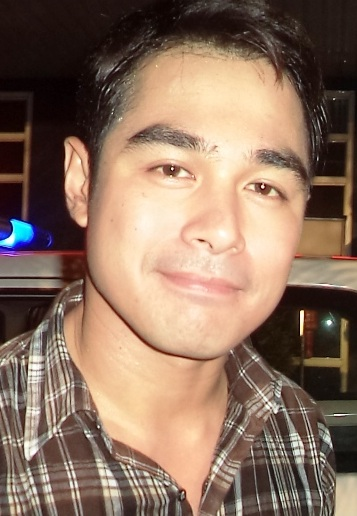
Benjamin Alves

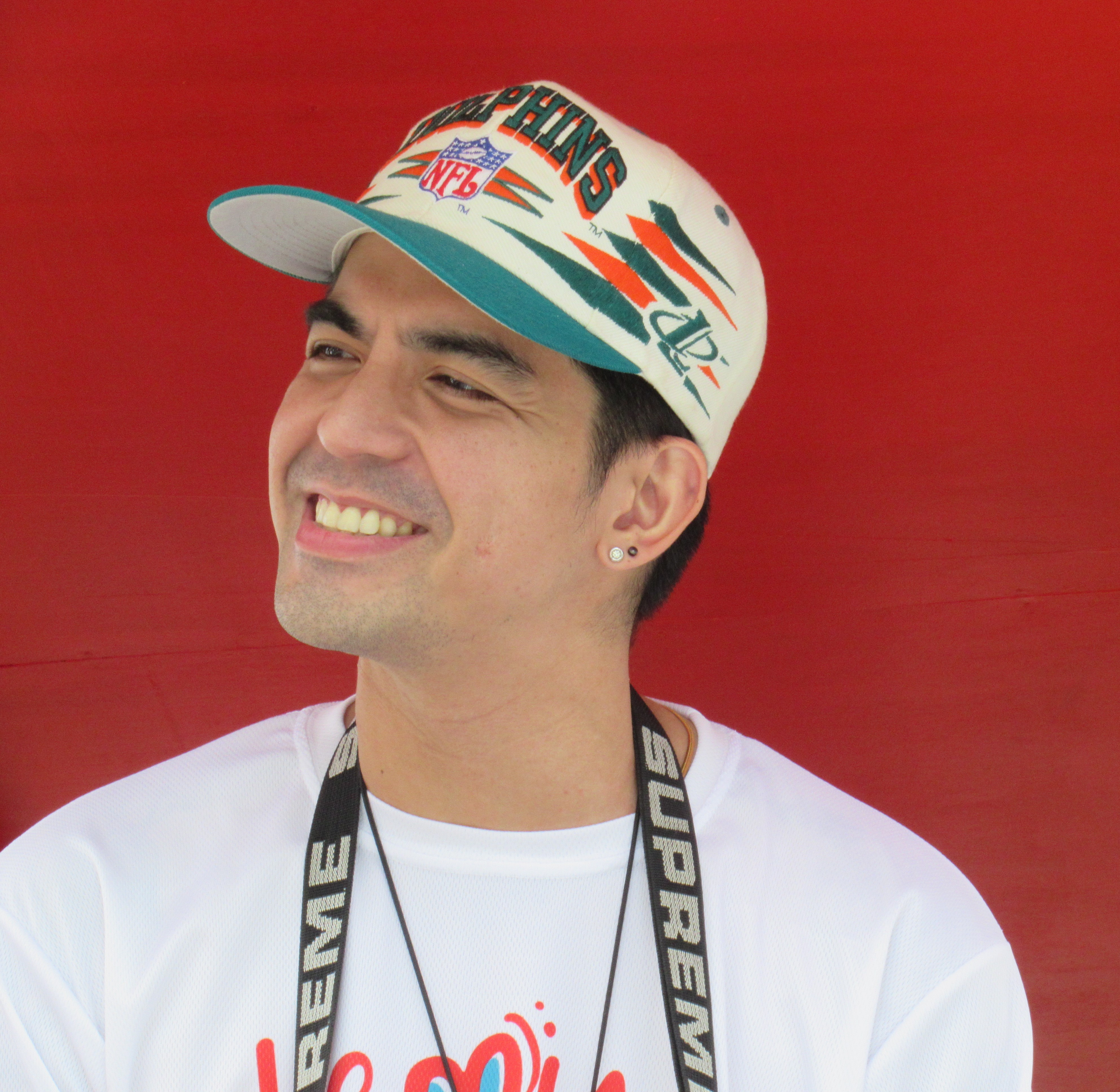
Mark Herras

Lead cast

- Rhian Ramos as Mary Jane "MJ" Ortega-Borromeo
- Kris Bernal as Klaire Almazan-Gomez / fake Carmen Dela Rama-Borromeo

Supporting cast

- Benjamin Alves as Noah Borromeo
- Mark Herras as Elijah Borromeo
- Glydel Mercado as Rose Ortega
- Mike Tan as Julian Pineda / Kristoffer
- Carla Martinez as Sarah Borromeo
- Maureen Larrazabal as Pinky
- Denise Barbacena as Chi-Chi
- Rain Matienzo as Tanya
- Brent Valdez as Jigs
- Topper Fabregas as Marcelle

Guest cast

- Victor Silayan as Alfred Gomez
- Francis Mata as Manny Gomez

== Casting ==
In June 2021, Benjamin Alves replaced Rocco Nacino in the series. Nacino was initially cast, and later left to appear in the Philippine drama series To Have & to Hold. Actress Jackie Rice was also initially included in the cast. Rice was later replaced by Kris Bernal.

== Production ==
Principal photography commenced in October 2021.

== Ratings ==
According to AGB Nielsen Philippines' Nationwide Urban Television Audience Measurement People in television homes, the pilot episode of Artikulo 247 earned a 6.1% rating. The final episode scored a 7.4% rating.
