= Hiram na Alaala =

Philippine television drama series

- Title card
- Also known as: Memories of Love
- Genre: Romantic drama
- Created by: Denoy Navarro-Punio
- Directed by: Dominic Zapata
- Creative director: Jun Lana
- Starring: Dennis Trillo; Kris Bernal; Lauren Young; Rocco Nacino
- Theme music composer: Pearisha Abubakar
- Opening theme: "Sa'Yo na Lang Ako" by Dennis Trillo
- Country of origin: Philippines
- Original language: Tagalog
- No. of episodes: 80 (list of episodes)

Production
- Executive producer: Michele Borja
- Production locations: Quezon City, Philippines
- Camera setup: Multiple-camera setup
- Running time: 30–45 minutes
- Production company: GMA Entertainment TV

Original release
- Network: GMA Network
- Release: September 22, 2014 – January 9, 2015

Hiram na Alaala (transl. borrowed memory / international title: Memories of Love) is a Philippine television drama romance series broadcast by GMA Network. Directed by Dominic Zapata, it stars Dennis Trillo, Kris Bernal, Lauren Young and Rocco Nacino. It premiered on September 22, 2014 on the network's Telebabad line up. The series concluded on January 9, 2015, with a total of 80 episodes.

== Cast and characters ==
Cast

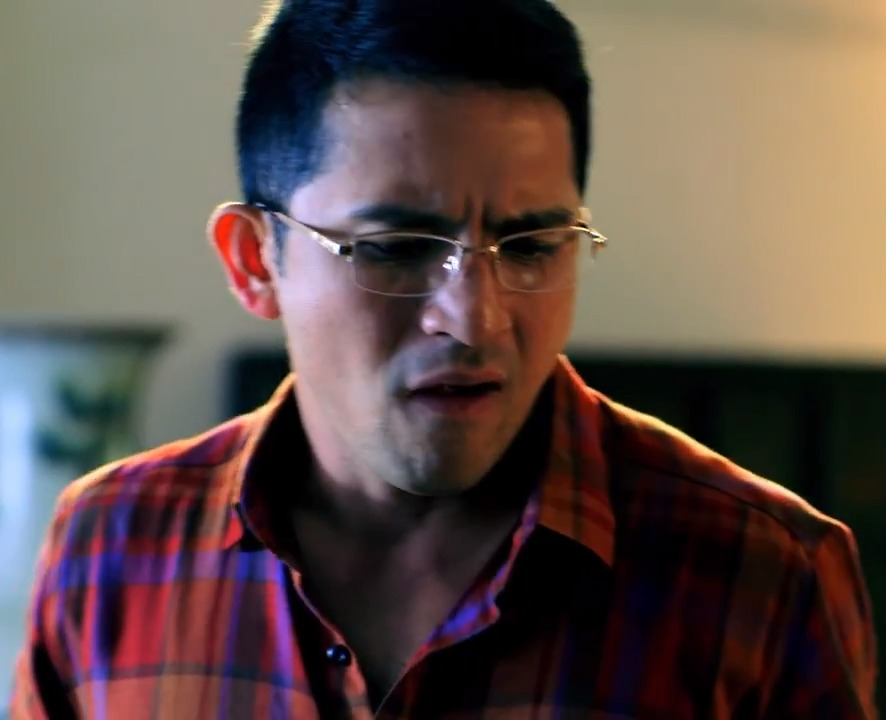
Dennis Trillo

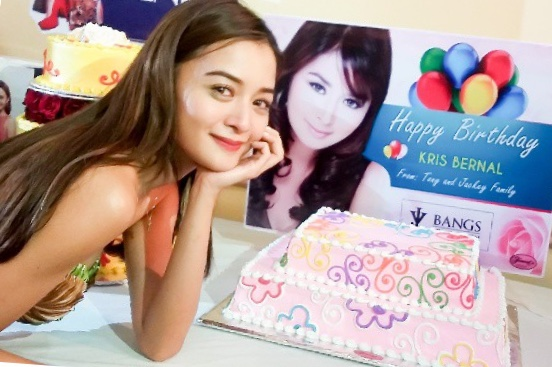
Kris Bernal

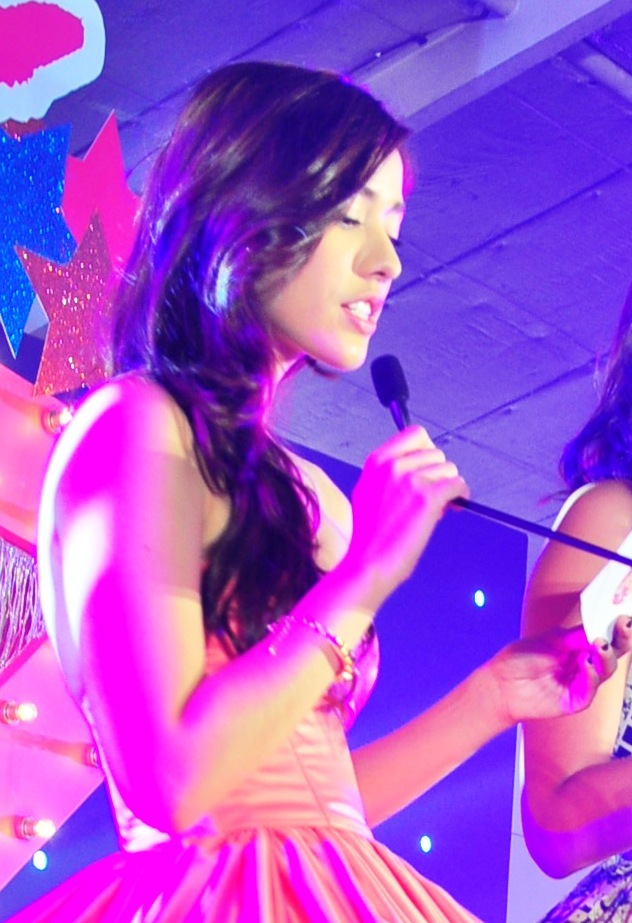
Lauren Young

Lead cast

- Dennis Trillo as Ivan Legazpi
- Kris Bernal as Andrea "Andeng" Dizon-Legazpi
- Lauren Young as Bethany Sandoval-Alcantara
- Rocco Nacino as Joseph "Otep" Corpuz

Supporting cast

- Jackie Lou Blanco as Regina Legazpi
- Allan Paule as Alexander "Xander" Dizon
- Lotlot de Leon as Annabelle Sta. Cruz-Dizon
- Nina Ricci Alagao as Martina Sandoval
- Shyr Valdez as Araceli Corpuz
- Dexter Doria as Yolanda "Ola" Dizon
- Antonio Aquitania as Benedict Corpuz
- Julia Lee as Gelai
- Kenneth Paul Cruz as Christian "Chris" Corpuz
- Jenny Rose as Krissy Corpuz
- Rap Fernandez as Bruno

Guest cast

- Hershey Garcia as younger Andeng
- Carl Acosta as younger Ivan
- Timothy Chan as younger Otep
- Kiel Rodriguez as Rod
- Sheena Halili as Yasmin Perez-Corpuz
- Benjamin Alves as Kevin Luna
- Bettina Carlos
- Mike Tan
- Edwin Reyes
- Rez Cortez
- Madelaine Nicolas

== Ratings ==
Hiram na Alaala ratings
Episode	Original air date	AGB Nielsen Mega Manila Households Television Homes			Ref.
Episode	Original air date	Rating	Timeslot rank	Primetime rank	Ref.
1	September 22, 2014	19.8%	#1	#6	
2	September 23, 2014	18.3%	#1	#7	
3	September 24, 2014	19.4%	#1	#7	
4	September 25, 2014	19.4%	#1	#7	
5	September 26, 2014	20.9%	#1	#3	
6	September 29, 2014	18.8%	#1	#7	
7	September 30, 2014	17.6%	#1	#7	
8	October 1, 2014	19.3%	#1	#6	
9	October 2, 2014	18.2%	#1	#7	
10	October 3, 2014	20.2%	#1	#5	
11	October 6, 2014	16.7%	#2	#8	
12	October 7, 2014	16.3%	#2	#7	
13	October 8, 2014	17.6%	#2	#8	
14	October 9, 2014	19.8%	#2	#8	
15	October 10, 2014	18.8%	#2	#7	
16	October 13, 2014	16.2%	#1	#7	
17	October 14, 2014	16.7%	#1	#7	
18	October 15, 2014	17.2%	#1	#7	
19	October 16, 2014	17.6%	#1	#7	
20	October 17, 2014	18.3%	#1	#5	
21	October 20, 2014	19.3%	#2	#5	
22	October 21, 2014	19.3%	#2	#4	
23	October 22, 2014	18.4%	#2	#6	
24	October 23, 2014	17.8%	#2	#5	
25	October 24, 2014	17.7%	#2	#7	
26	October 27, 2014	16.8%	#2	#6	
27	October 28, 2014	16.7%	#2	#5	
28	October 29, 2014	18.4%	#2	#5	
29	October 30, 2014	18.2%	#2	#7	
30	October 31, 2014	18.3%	#2	#4	
31	November 3, 2014	19.7%	#2	#4	
32	November 4, 2014	19.0%	#2	#5	
33	November 5, 2014	17.8%	#2	#7	
34	November 6, 2014	17.5%	#2	#7	
35	November 7, 2014	20.1%	#2	#4	
36	November 10, 2014	19.4%	#2	#4	
37	November 11, 2014	17.6%	#2	#6	
38	November 12, 2014	19.3%	#2	#5	
39	November 13, 2014	21.8%	#1	#2	
40	November 14, 2014	21.4%	#1	#2	
41	November 17, 2014	17.3%	#2	#8	
42	November 18, 2014	16.9%	#2	#7	
43	November 19, 2014	17.7%	#2	#7	
44	November 20, 2014	16.8%	#2	#8	
45	November 21, 2014	18.3%	#2	#7	
46	November 24, 2014	16.5%	#2	#8	
47	November 25, 2014	15.5%	#2	#9	
48	November 26, 2014	18.1%	#2	#7	
49	November 27, 2014	18.2%	#2	#7	
50	November 28, 2014	17.4%	#2	#8	
51	December 1, 2014	16.9%	#2	#8	
52	December 2, 2014	16.9%	#2	#8	
53	December 3, 2014	16.3%	#2	#8	
54	December 4, 2014	17.9%	#2	#8	
55	December 5, 2014	16.8%	#2	#8	
56	December 8, 2014	16.8%	#2	#10	
57	December 9, 2014	16.9%	#2	#9	
58	December 10, 2014	17.5%	#2	#7	
59	December 11, 2014	17.9%	#2	#7	
60	December 12, 2014	18.1%	#2	#6	
61	December 15, 2014	16.8%	#2	#8	
62	December 16, 2014	16.8%	#2	#8	
63	December 17, 2014	18.0%	#2	#5	
64	December 18, 2014	18.4%	#2	#6	
65	December 19, 2014	16.6%	#2	#7	
66	December 22, 2014	17.7%	#1	#5	
67	December 23, 2014	19.6%	#1	#1	
68	December 24, 2014	16.6%	#1	#5	
69	December 25, 2014	16.8%	#1	#5	
70	December 26, 2014	18.4%	#1	#4	
71	December 29, 2014	18.0%	#1	#6	
72	December 30, 2014	18.5%	#1	#4	
73	December 31, 2014	14.2%	#1	#3	
74	January 1, 2015	16.8%	#1	#7	
75	January 2, 2015	18.9%	#1	#4	
76	January 5, 2015	17.6%	#2	#8	
77	January 6, 2015	19.6%	#1	#4	
78	January 7, 2015	16.6%	#1	#6	
79	January 8, 2015	19.1%	#1	#5	
80	January 9, 2015	20.2%	#1	#2	

== Production ==
Principal photography commenced in August 2014.
