= List of current Filipino child actors =

This is a list of notable child actors from the Philippines. These actors are aged 19 and under. When they turn 20, they legally become young adults and are no longer listed as child actors but will be moved to the List of former Filipino child actors.

== A ==
Name	Date of birth	Television credit/s	Film credit/s	Acting Accolade/s
Lucas Andalio	July 4, 2018 (age 8)	Goin' Bulilit (2024); Incognito (2025); It's Showtime (2025)	Call Me Mother (2025); My Love Will Make You Disappear (2025)	51st Metro Manila Film Festival

== C ==
Name	Date of birth	Television credit/s	Film credit/s	Acting Accolade/s
Marcus Cabais	August 31, 2009 (age 17)	It's Showtime (2015-2017); Team Yey! (2018); Dream Maker (2022-2023); 100 Days Miracle (2023)	My 2 Mommies (2018)	
Caprice Cayetano	November 10, 2008 (age 18)	Strawberry Lane (2014); Kalyeserye (2015); Poor Señorita (2016); URL: Usapang Real Love (2016); Karelasyon (2016); Alyas Robin Hood (2016-2017); Mulawin vs. Ravena (2017); Kambal, Karibal (2017); The Lolas' Beautiful Show (2017); Tadhana (2017-2025); Magpakailanman (2017-2025); Stories for the Soul (2018); Hindi Ko Kayang Iwan Ka (2018); Asawa Ko, Karibal Ko (2019); Daig Kayo ng Lola Ko (2018-2025); Maynila (2019); Alex & Amie (2019); Prima Donnas (2019); Love You Two (2019); Daddy's Gurl (2019); Wish Ko Lang! (2024); Abot-Kamay na Pangarap (2024); Lolong: Bayani ng Bayan (2025); TiktoClock (2025-2026); Cruz vs Cruz (2025-2026); Pinoy Big Brother: Celebrity Collab Edition 2.0 (2025-2026); You're My Favorite Song (2026); Family Feud (2026); Fast Talk with Boy Abunda (2026)	Barber's Tales (2013); Felix Manalo (2015); Trip Ubusan: The Lolas vs. Zombies (2017); Mystified (2019)	Anak TV Seal Awards
Annika Co	September 23, 2016 (age 10)	It's Showtime (2025–present); Lumuhod Ka sa Lupa (2024); Golden Scenery of Tomorrow (2025-2026)	Penduko (2023); Sunshine (2024); Blooming (2025); A Werewolf Boy (2026)	

== G ==
Name	Date of birth	Television credit/s	Film credit/s	Acting Accolade/s
Baste Granfon	August 22, 2012 (age 14)	Eat Bulaga! (2015–2025); Ang Pinaka (2015); Kapuso Mo, Jessica Soho (2015); Aha! (2015); Daig Kayo ng Lola Ko (2018–2019); Daddy's Gurl (2019); The Gift (2019); Jose & Maria's Bonggang Villa (2022)	Meant to Beh (2017); Jack Em Popoy: The Puliscredibles (2018)	3rd PEP List Awards; Push Awards; 30th PMPC Star Awards for Television; ComGuild Academe's Choice Awards; 9th ComGuild Awards; 43rd Metro Manila Film Festival; 49th GMMSF Box-Office Entertainment Awards

== M ==
Name	Date of birth	Television credit/s	Film credit/s	Acting Accolade/s
Chlaui Malayao	January 24, 2008 (age 18)	Yagit (2014–15); Little Nanay (2015-2016); Magpakailanman (2015-2016); Encantadia (2016); Conan, My Beautician (2016); Sa Piling ni Nanay (2016); D' Originals (2017); Wagas (2017); Daig Kayo ng Lola Ko (2017-2020); Abot-Kamay na Pangarap (2022); Wish Ko Lang! (2023); Imbestigador (2023); Pinoy Crime Stories (2023-2024); Black Rider (2023)	Moron 5.2: The Transformation (2014)	
Raikko Mateo	July 31, 2008 (age 18)	Wansapanataym (2013-2016); Honesto (2013-2014); Goin' Bulilit (2014-19); Ipaglaban Mo! (2014–19); Hawak Kamay (2014); Dream Dad (2014); Pasión de Amor (2015); FPJ's Ang Probinsyano (2015); Walang Iwanan (2015); You're My Home (2015); The Greatest Love (2015); Bagani (2018); Starla (2019); Pamilya Ko (2019–20)	Feng Shui 2 (2014); Resureksyon (2015); Beauty and the Bestie (2015); Northern Lights: A Journey to Love (2017); Woke Up Like This (2017); Yorme: The Isko Domagoso Story (2022)	28th PMPC Star Awards for Television; Yahoo! Celebrity Awards 2014; 45th Guillermo Mendoza Box Office Entertainment Awards; 16th Gawad PASADO Awards
Euwenn Mikaell	January 14, 2013 (age 13)	Magpakailanman (2016-2025); Someone to Watch Over Me (2016-2017); Destined to be Yours (2017); The One That Got Away (2018); Cain at Abel (2018); My Special Tatay (2018-2019); Ika-5 Utos (2019); Hanggang sa Dulo ng Buhay Ko (2019); One of the Baes (2019-2020); Nakarehas na Puso (2023); The Write One (2023); Abot-Kamay na Pangarap (2024); Regal Studio Presents (2024); It's Showtime (2024); Forever Young (2024-2025); Hating Kapatid (2025); Kamao (2026)	Squad Goals (2018); Firefly (2023); Lolo and the Kid (2024); Samahan ng mga Makasalanan (2025); P77 (2025); The Delivery Rider (2025); Out of Order (2025)	52nd Box Office Entertainment Awards; Paragon Film Lokal Choice Awards; Platinum Stallion National Media Awards 2024; 47th Gawad Urian Award; 40th PMPC Star Awards for Movies; 2024 Bulacan Gintong Kabataan Awards (GKA)
Alonzo Muhlach	February 19, 2010 (age 16)	Eat Bulaga! (2014); Goin' Bulilit (2015); Inday Bote (2015); Wansapanataym: Yamishita's Treasures (2015); Ang Panday (2016); Happy Truck HAPPinas (2016); Your Face Sounds Familiar Kids (Philippine TV series) season 1 (2017); D' Originals (2017); ASAP (2017)	The Trial (2014); My Big Bossing (2014); Kubot: The Aswang Chronicles 2 (2014); Wang Fam (2015); Beauty and the Bestie (2015); Enteng Kabisote 10 and the Abangers (2016); Rewind (2023)	2nd PEP List Awards; 63rd FAMAS Awards; 29th PMPC Star Awards for Television; 41st Metro Manila Film Festival; 32nd PMPC Star Awards for Movies; 3rd PEP List Awards; 2nd Alta Media Icon Awards; 30th PMPC Star Awards for Television
Krystal Mejes	July 12, 2008 (age 18)	Doble Kara (2015–2017) A Love to Last (2017) Nang Ngumiti ang Langit (2019) The Haunted (2019 - 2020) Lavender Fields (2024 - 2025) What Lies Beneath (2025 - 2026) Pinoy Big Brother: Celebrity Collab Edition 2.0 (2025 - 2026) Juan and Lily Run for SK	Matapang (short film); Family Matters (2022)	

== P ==
Name	Date of birth	Television credit/s	Film credit/s	Acting Accolade/s
Onyok Pineda	October 1, 2010 (age 16)	It's Showtime (2014); FPJ's Ang Probinsyano (2015-2017; 2022); Wansapanataym (2017); Your Face Sounds Familiar Kids (2018); The Kid's Choice (2018); Maalaala Mo Kaya (2019); The Haunted (2019)	The Super Parental Guardians (2016); Loving in Tandem (2017); Ang Panday (2017); 3pol Trobol: Huli Ka Balbon! (2019)	Box Office Entertainment Awards; Comguild Academe's Choice Awards; LionhearTV RAWR Awards; PMPC Star Awards for Movies; PMPC Star Awards for Television

== Y ==
Name	Year of Birth	Television Credit/s	Film Credit/s	Acting Accolade/s
Bimby Yap	April 19, 2007 (age 19)	Kung Tayo'y Magkakalayo (2010); Kris TV (2011–2016)	Noy (2010); My Little Bossings (2013); Praybeyt Benjamin 2 (2014); All You Need Is Pag-ibig (2015)	2013 Baby and Family Expo Philippines (shared with Ryzza Mae Dizon); 2013 MMFF; 2014 GMMSF Box-Office Entertainment Awards (shared with Ryzza Mae Dizon); 62nd FAMAS Awards; 40th Metro Manila Film Festival; Platinum Stallion Media Awards; SKAL Tourism Awards; 5th EdukCircle Awards; Platinum Stallion Media Awards
