= List of Cain at Abel episodes =

Cain at Abel (transl. Cain and Abel) is a 2018 Philippine television drama action series broadcast by GMA Network. Directed by Mark A. Reyes, it stars Dingdong Dantes and Dennis Trillo. It premiered on the network's Telebabad line up on November 19, 2018, to February 15, 2019, replacing Victor Magtanggol.

NUTAM (Nationwide Urban Television Audience Measurement) People in Television Homes ratings are provided by AGB Nielsen Philippines.

== Series overview ==
Month	Episodes	
Month	Episodes	Monthly averages
November	10	11.0%
December	21	9.5%
January	23	9.8%
February	11	10.2%

== Episodes ==
=== November 2018 ===
Episode		Original air date	Social media hashtag	ProdCode	AGB Nielsen NUTAM People in Television homes			Ref.
Episode		Original air date	Social media hashtag	ProdCode	Audience Share	Timeslot rank	Whole day rank	Ref.
1	"Pilot"	November 19, 2018	#CainAtAbel	1001 - A	11.6%	#2		
2	"Daniel at Elias" (Daniel and Elias)	November 20, 2018	#CAADanielAtElias	1002 - B	11.0%	#2		
3	"Pagtataksil" (Disloyalty)	November 21, 2018	#CAAPagtataksil	1003 - C	11.3%	#2		
4	"Pray for Sammy"	November 22, 2018	#CAAPrayForSammy	1004 - D	10.4%	#2		
5	"Fall Guy"	November 23, 2018	#CAAFallGuy	1005 - E	10.3%	#2		
6	"Sakripisyo ni Elias" (Elias' Sacrifice)	November 26, 2018	#CAASakripisyoNiElias	1006 - F	9.6%	#2		
7	"Pagdududa" (Doubt)	November 27, 2018	#CAAPagdududa	1007 - G	11.6%	#2		
8	"Bagong Kaibigan" (New Friend)	November 28, 2018	#CAABagongKaibigan	1008 - H	11.5%	#2		
9	"Ulirang Ina" (Standardized Mother)	November 29, 2018	#CAAUlirangIna	1010 - J	11.2%	#2		
10	"Buhay Preso" (Life in Prison)	November 30, 2018	#CAABuhayPreso	1009 - I	11.4%	#2		

=== December 2018 ===
Episode		Original air date	Social media hashtag	ProdCode	AGB Nielsen NUTAM People in Television homes			Ref.
Episode		Original air date	Social media hashtag	ProdCode	Audience Share	Timeslot rank	Whole day rank	Ref.
11	"Hiling ng Ama" (A Father's Request)	December 3, 2018	#CAAHilingNgAma	1011 - K	11.3%	#2		
12	"The Negotiator"	December 4, 2018	#CAATheNegotiator	1012 - L	11.0%	#2		
13	"Pagdududa" (Doubt)	December 5, 2018	#CAAPagdududa	1013 - M	10.5%	#2		
14	"Daniel at Margaret" (Daniel and Margaret)	December 6, 2018	#CAADanielAtMargaret	1014 - N	9.1%	#2		
15	"Gang Wars"	December 7, 2018	#CAAGangWars	1016 - P	10.9%	#2		
16	"Pagseselos" (Jealousy)	December 10, 2018	#CAAPagseselos	1017 - Q	9.5%	#2		
17	"Riot"	December 11, 2018	#CAARiot	1018 - R	9.4%	#2		
18	"Pagtakas" (Escape)	December 12, 2018	#CAAPagtakas	1019 - S	9.6%	#2		
19	"Harapan" (Confrontation)	December 13, 2018	#CAAHarapan	1015 - O	9.1%	#2		
20	"Laban ni Daniel" (Daniel's Fight)	December 14, 2018	#CAALabanNiDaniel	1021 - U	10.2%	#2		
21	"Alaala ni Elias" (Elias' Memory)	December 17, 2018	#CAAAlaalaNiElias	1020 - T	9.6%	#2		
22	"Banta ni Daniel" (Daniel's Threat)	December 18, 2018	#CAABantaNiDaniel	1023 - W	9.8%	#2		
23	"Father and Son"	December 19, 2018	#CAAFatherAndSon	1022 - V	9.0%	#2		
24	"Save Sammy"	December 20, 2018	#CAASaveSammy	1024 - X	9.3%	#2		
25	"Kapit Lang" (Hold On)	December 21, 2018	#CAAKapitLang	1025 - Y	10.2%	#2		
26	"Saksi si Daniel" (Daniel is a Witness)	December 24, 2018	#CAASaksiSiDaniel	1028 - BB	8.6%	#2		
27	"Dalaw ni Elias" (Elias' Visit)	December 25, 2018	#CAADalawNiElias	1026 - Z	8.9%	#2		
28	"Nasaan ang Hustisya?" (Where's Justice?)	December 26, 2018	#CAANasaanAngHustisya	1027 - AA	9.0%	#2		
29	"Depressed"	December 27, 2018	#CAADepressed	1029 - CC	9.1%	#2		
30	"Ayaw Paawat" (Unacceptable)	December 28, 2018	#CAAAwayPaawat	1030 - DD	9.3%	#2		
31	"Hideout"	December 31, 2018	#CAAHideout	1031 - EE	8.5%	#2		

=== January 2019 ===
Episode		Original air date	Social media hashtag	ProdCode	AGB Nielsen NUTAM People in Television Homes			Ref.
Episode		Original air date	Social media hashtag	ProdCode	Rating	Timeslot rank	Whole day rank	Ref.
32	"Paghihiganti" (Vengeance)	January 1, 2019	#CAAPaghihiganti	1032 - FF	9.6%	#2		
33	"Aksidente" (Accident)	January 2, 2019	#CAAAksidente	1033 - GG	10.8%	#2		
34	"Search for Elias"	January 3, 2019	#CAASearchForElias	1035 - II	10.5%	#2		
35	"Hiding in Tandem"	January 4, 2019	#CAAHidingInTandem	1034 - HH	10.1%	#2		
36	"Daniel Meets Fe"	January 7, 2019	#CAADanielMeetsFe	1037 - KK	9.5%	#2		
37	"Galit ni Elias" (Elias' Anger)	January 8, 2019	#CAAGalitNiElias	1038 - LL	10.6%	#2		
38	"Bagong Daniel" (New Daniel)	January 9, 2019	#CAABagongDaniel	1036 - JJ	10.1%	#2		
39	"Engkwentro" (Encounter)	January 10, 2019	#CAAEngkwentro	1039 - MM	9.9%	#2		
40	"Daniel vs. Alex"	January 11, 2019	#CAADanieVsAlex	1040 - NN	9.8%	#2		
41	"Mas Astig" (More Badass)	January 14, 2019	#CAAMasAstig	1041 - OO	9.9%	#2		
42	"Paghahanap" (Searching)	January 15, 2019	#CAAPaghahanap	1042 - PP	10.0%	#2		
43	"Face to Face"	January 16, 2019	#CAAFaceToFace	1043 - QQ	10.5%	#2		
44	"The Chase"	January 17, 2019	#CAATheChase	1047 - UU	9.0%	#2		
45	"Muling Pagkikita" (Another Encounter)	January 18, 2019	#CAAMulingPagkikita	1044 - RR	9.8%	#2		
46	"Ambush"	January 21, 2019	#CAAAmbush	1045 - SS	9.0%	#2		
47	"Hulihin si Elias" (Catch Elias)	January 22, 2019	#CAAHulihinSiElias	1046 - TT	9.1%	#2		
48	"Kidnap"	January 23, 2019	#CAAKidnap	1048 - VV	9.6%	#2		
49	"Father's Love"	January 24, 2019	#CAAFathersLove	1049 - WW	9.5%	#2		
50	"Pasabog" (Surprise)	January 25, 2019	#CAAPasabog	1050 - XX	9.6%	#2		
51	"Manhunt"	January 28, 2019	#CAAManhunt	1051 - YY	9.1%	#2		
52	"Alaala ni Fe" (Fe's Memory)	January 29, 2019	#CAAAlaalaNife	1052 - ZZ	9.3%	#2		
53	"Crying for Help"	January 30, 2019	#CAACryingForHelp	1053 - AAA	9.7%	#2		
54	"Tuloy ang Laban" (The Battle Continues)	January 31, 2019	#CAATuloyAngLaban	1054 - BBB	9.6%	#2		

=== February 2019 ===
Episode		Original air date	Social media hashtag	ProdCode	AGB Nielsen NUTAM People in Television homes			Ref.
Episode		Original air date	Social media hashtag	ProdCode	Audience Share	Timeslot rank	Whole day rank	Ref.
55	"Restless Heart"	February 1, 2019	#CAARestlessHeart	1056 - DDD	9.2%	#2		
56	"Revenge"	February 4, 2019	#CAARevenge	1055 - CCC	9.5%	#2		
57	"Kutob ni Daniel" (Daniel's Heartbeat)	February 5, 2019	#CAAKutobNiDaniel	1057 - EEE	9.6%	#2		
58	"Galit ni Diego" (Diego's Anger)	February 6, 2019	#CAAGalitNiDiego	1058 - FFF	9.3%	#2		
59	"Finding My Sons"	February 7, 2019	#CAAFindingMySons	1059 - GGG	10.3%	#2		
60	"Nasaan Ka, Miguel?" (Where Are You, Miguel?)	February 8, 2019	#CAANasaanSiMiguel	1060 - HHH	9.7%	#2		
61	"Magkapatid" (Brothers)	February 11, 2019	#CAAMagkapatid	1061 - III	9.9%	#2		
62	"Daniel at Miguel" (Daniel and Miguel)	February 12, 2019	#CAADanielAtMiguel	1062 - JJJ	11.7%	#2		
63	"Pagsuko" (Giving Up)	February 13, 2019	#CAAPagsuko	1063 - KKK	10.6%	#2		
64	"Kill the Brothers"	February 14, 2019	#CAAKillTheBrothers	1064 - LLL	11.0%	#2		
65	"Magkasangga" (Together)	February 15, 2019	#CAAMagkasangga	1067 - OOO	11.6%	#2		
