= List of My Special Tatay episodes =

My Special Tatay (transl. My special dad) is a 2018 Philippine television drama series starring Ken Chan, Rita Daniela, Lilet, Candy Pangilinan and Arra San Agustin. The series premiered on GMA Network's Afternoon Prime block and worldwide on GMA Pinoy TV from September 3, 2018 to March 29, 2019, replacing Hindi Ko Kayang Iwan Ka.

NUTAM (Nationwide Urban Television Audience Measurement) People in Television Homes ratings are provided by AGB Nielsen Philippines. The series ended, but its the 30th-week run, and with 150 episodes. It was replaced by Bihag in Inagaw na Bituin's timeslot.

== Series overview ==
Month	Episodes	Monthly averages
Month	Episodes	NUTAM
September 2018	20	5.1%
October 2018	22	
November 2018	22	
December 2018	21	
January 2019	23	
February 2019	20	
March 2019	21	

== Episodes ==
=== September 2018 ===
Episode		Original air date	Social media hashtag	AGB Nielsen NUTAM People in Television Homes			Ref.
Episode		Original air date	Social media hashtag	Rating	Timeslot rank	Whole day rank	Ref.
1	"Pilot"	September 3, 2018	#MySpecialTatay	6.6%	#1	#12	
2	"Pagdadalang-tao" (Pregnancy)	September 4, 2018	#MSTPagdadalangTao	5.7%	#1	#14	
3	"Buwis Buhay" (Life Threat)	September 5, 2018	#MSTBuwisBuhay	5.0%	#1	#15	
4	"Laban ni Isay" (Isay's Battle)	September 6, 2018	#MSTLabanNiIsay	5.9%	#1	#13	
5	"Hustisya" (Justice)	September 7, 2018	#MSTHustisya	5.1%	#1	#17	
6	"Boyet"	September 10, 2018	#MSTBoyet	4.5%	#2	#19	
7	"Binata na si Boyet" (Boyet's Young Man)	September 11, 2018	#MSTBinataNaSiBoyet	5.3%	#1	#14	
8	"Diskarte ni Boyet" (Boyet's Strategy)	September 12, 2018	#MSTDiskarteNiBoyet	4.9%	#2	#18	
9	"Brokenhearted"	September 13, 2018	#MSTBrokenhearted	5.2%	#2	#15	
10	"Tampuhan" (Sulky)	September 14, 2018	#MSTTampuhan	6.0%	#2	#16	
11	"Pustahan" (Betting)	September 17, 2018	#MSTPustahan	5.9%	#2	#16	
12	"Buntis" (Pregnant)	September 18, 2018	#MSTBuntis	5.5%	#2	#17	
13	"Pigilan si Aubrey" (Stop Aubrey)	September 19, 2018	#MSTPigilanSiAubrey	5.0%	#2	#21	
14	"Job Hunting"	September 20, 2018	#MSTJobHunting	4.8%	#2		
15	"Tokhang"	September 21, 2018	#MSTTokhang	4.6%	#2		
16	"Muling Pagkikita" (Meeting Again)	September 24, 2018	#MSTMulingPagKikita	4.1%	#2	#20	
17	"Nagkataon, Nagkatagpo" (Incidentally, It Encounters)	September 25, 2018	#MSTNagkataonNagkatagpo	4.0%	#2		
18	"Unang Salpukan" (First Clash)	September 26, 2018	#MSTUnangSalpukan	4.2%	#2		
19	"Sakripisyo ni Boyet" (Boyet's Sacrifice)	September 27, 2018	#MSTSakripisyoNiBoyet	4.9%	#2	#18	
20	"Carol vs. Aubrey"	September 28, 2018	#MSTCarolVsAubrey	4.5%	#1	#16	

=== October 2018 ===
Episode		Original air date	Social media hashtag	AGB Nielsen NUTAM People in Television Homes			Ref.
Episode		Original air date	Social media hashtag	Rating	Timeslot rank	Whole day rank	Ref.
21	"Rebelasyon" (Revelation)	October 1, 2018	#MSTRebelasyon	3.8%	#2		
22	"Baby for Sale"	October 2, 2018	#MSTBabyForSale				
23	"Buking si Aubrey" (Aubrey is Seen)	October 3, 2018	#MSTBukingSiAubrey				
24	"Olivia's Evil Plan"	October 4, 2018	#MSTOliviasEvilPlan				
25	"Boyet in Danger"	October 5, 2018	#MSTBoyetInDanger				
26	"Dalamhati ni Carol" (Carol's Grief)	October 8, 2018	#MSTDalamhatiNiCarol				
27	"Lihim na Tulong" (Secret Help)	October 9, 2018	#MSTLihimNaTulong				
28	"Tatay na si Boyet" (Boyet is Now a Father)	October 10, 2018	#MSTTatayNaSiBoyet				
29	"Takas ni Aubrey" (Aubrey's Escape)	October 11, 2018	#MSTTakasNiAubrey				
30	"Aksidente" (Accident)	October 12, 2018	#MSTAksidente				
31	"Pasabog ni Soledad" (Soledad's Petard)	October 15, 2018	#MSTPasabogNiSoledad	5.6%	#1		
32	"Nabunyag na Lihim" (Revealed Secret)	October 16, 2018	#MSTNabunyagNaLihim	6.9%	#1		
33	"Olivia Desperado" (Desperate Olivia)	October 17, 2018	#MSTOliviaDesperado	5.8%	#1		
34	"Isay vs. Olivia"	October 18, 2018	#MSTIsayVsOlivia	6.2%	#1		
35	"Hiling ni Edgar" (Edgar's Request)	October 19, 2018	#MSTHilingNiEdgar	5.9%	#1	#13	
36	"Pangungulila" (Desolation)	October 22, 2018	#MSTPangungulila	6.2%	#1	#13	
37	"DNA"	October 23, 2018	#MSTDNA	6.0%	#1		
38	"Panlilinlang" (Deception)	October 24, 2018	#MSTPanlilinlang	6.5%	#1		
39	"Panunuyo" (Suit)	October 25, 2018	#MSTPanunuyo	6.2%	#1	#15	
40	"Selos si Isay" (Isay is Jealous)	October 26, 2018	#MSTSelosSiIsay	5.6%	#1		
41	"Sikreto ni Boyet" (Boyet's Secret)	October 29, 2018	#MSTSikretoNiBoyet				
42	"Linlang" (Deceive)	October 30, 2018	#MSTLinlang	8.3%	#1	#11	
43	"Sibling Rivalry"	October 31, 2018	#MSTSiblingRivalry				

=== November 2018 ===
Episode		Original air date	Social media hashtag	AGB Nielsen NUTAM People in Television Homes			Ref.
Episode		Original air date	Social media hashtag	Rating	Timeslot rank	Whole day rank	Ref.
44	"Banta" (Threat)	November 1, 2018	#MSTBanta				
45	"Sugod ni Odie" (Odie's Move)	November 2, 2018	#MSTSugodNiOdie				
46	"Sakripisyo" (Sacrifice)	November 5, 2018	#MSTSakripisyo				
47	"Saving Odie"	November 6, 2018	#MSTSavingOdie				
48	"Peace Be with You"	November 7, 2018	#MSTPeaceBeWithYou				
49	"Tukso" (Temptation)	November 8, 2018	#MSTTukso				
50	"Frame Up"	November 9, 2018	#MSTFrameUp				
51	"Kalaboso" (Jail)	November 12, 2018	#MSTKalaboso				
52	"Stage Drama"	November 13, 2018	#MSTStageDrama				
53	"Family Dinner"	November 14, 2018	#MSTFamilyDinner				
54	"New Home"	November 15, 2018	#MSTNewHome				
55	"Inosente" (Innocent)	November 16, 2018	#MSTInosente				
56	"Bistado" (Busted)	November 19, 2018	#MSTBistado	5.2%	#1		
57	"Tampuhan" (Sulky)	November 20, 2018	#MSTTampuhan	6.3%	#1		
58	"Tanan" (Elopement)	November 21, 2018	#MSTTanan	6.8%	#1		
59	"Kasal-kasalan" (Fake Wedding)	November 22, 2018	#MSTKasalKasalan	6.4%	#1		
60	"Will You Marry Me?"	November 23, 2018	#MSTWillYouMarryMe	5.6%	#1	#15	
61	"The Wedding"	November 26, 2018	#MSTTheWedding	5.5%	#1		
62	"Sukol" (Defy)	November 27, 2018	#MSTSukol	5.7%	#1		
63	"Mabuhay ang Bagong Kasal" (Long Live the Newly Weds)	November 28, 2018	#MSTMabuhayAngBagongKasal	5.7%	#1		
64	"Confession"	November 29, 2018	#MSTConfession	6.1%	#1		
65	"The Plan"	November 30, 2018	#MSTThePlan	5.9%	#1		

=== December 2018 ===
Episode		Original air date	Social media hashtag	AGB Nielsen NUTAM People in Television Homes			Ref.
Episode		Original air date	Social media hashtag	Rating	Timeslot rank	Whole day rank	Ref.
66	"Hiwalayan" (Separation)	December 3, 2018	#MSTHiwalayan	5.2%	#1		
67	"Break Up"	December 4, 2018	#MSTBreakUp	5.2%	#1		
68	"Resbak" (Fight Back)	December 5, 2018	#MSTResbak	5.5%	#1		
69	"Inggitan" (Enviousness)	December 6, 2018	#MSTInggitan	5.7%	#1		
70	"Asawa vs. Nanay" (Wife vs. Mother)	December 7, 2018	#MSTAsawaVsNanay	5.1%	#1		
71	"Babala" (Warning)	December 10, 2018	#MSTBabala				
72	"Biyenan Problems" (In-law Problems)	December 11, 2018	#MSTBiyenanProblems				
73	"Tatay Boyet" (Father Boyet)	December 12, 2018	#MSTTatayBoyet				
74	"Trahedya" (Tragedy)	December 13, 2018	#MSTTrahedya				
75	"Panganib" (Danger)	December 14, 2018	#MSTPanganib				
76	"Finding Edgar"	December 17, 2018	#MSTFindingEdgar				
77	"Miss Kita, Tatay" (I Miss You, Tatay)	December 18, 2018	#MSTMissKitaTatay				
78	"Kapatid vs. Kapatid" (Sibling vs. Sibling)	December 19, 2018	#MSTKapatidVsKapatid				
79	"Get Well, Lola Sol"	December 20, 2018	#MSTGetWellLolaSol				
80	"Gipit" (Scarce)	December 21, 2018	#MSTGipit				
81	"Akyat Bahay" (House Climb)	December 24, 2018	#MSTAkyatBahay	6.1%	#1		
82	"Balik Tenement" (Back to Tenement)	December 25, 2018	#MSTBalikTenement	4.4%	#1		
83	"Waterboy"	December 26, 2018	#MSTWaterboy	5.5%	#1		
84	"Friendzone"	December 27, 2018	#MSTFriendzone	5.9%	#1		
85	"Raket" (Easy Job)	December 28, 2018	#MSTRaket	7.0%	#1		
86	"Extra Service"	December 31, 2018	#MSTExtraService	5.9%	#1		

=== January 2019 ===
Episode		Original air date	Social media hashtag	AGB Nielsen NUTAM People in Television Homes			Ref.
Episode		Original air date	Social media hashtag	Rating	Timeslot rank	Whole day rank	Ref.
87	"Raid"	January 1, 2019	#MSTRaid	5.2%	#1		
88	"Kalaboso" (Prison)	January 2, 2019	#MSTKalaboso	6.0%	#1		
89	"Bakit, Aubrey?" (Why, Aubrey?)	January 3, 2019	#MSTBakitAubrey	6.1%	#1		
90	"Istokwa"	January 4, 2019	#MSTIstokwa	5.8%	#1		
91	"Oplan Paghahanap"	January 7, 2019	#MSTOplanPaghahanap	5.9%	#1		
92	"Peligro" (Danger)	January 8, 2019	#MSTPeligro	5.8%	#1		
93	"Bagong Taon" (New Year)	January 9, 2019	#MSTBagongTaon	5.8%	#1		
94	"Guilty"	January 10, 2019	#MSTGuilty	6.5%	#1		
95	"Reunion"	January 11, 2019	#MSTReunion	6.2%	#1		
96	"Happy Together	January 14, 2019	#MSTHappyTogether	5.9%	#1		
97	"True Feelings"	January 15, 2019	#MSTTrueFeelings	5.6%	#1		
98	"Job Hunt"	January 16, 2019	#MSTJobHunt	6.2%	#1		
99	"Ahente" (Agent)	January 17, 2019	#MSTAhente	5.8%	#1		
100	"Bistado" (Caught)	January 18, 2019	#MSTBistado	6.4%	#1		
101	"Di Inaasahan" (Unexpected)	January 21, 2019	#MSTDiInaasahan				
102	"Pinagtatagpo" (Encountered)	January 22, 2019	#MSTPinagtatagpo				
103	"Pag-amin" (Confession)	January 23, 2019	#MSTPagAmin				
104	"Pag-iwas" (Avoidance)	January 24, 2019	#MSTPagIwas				
105	"Paglayo" (Separation)	January 25, 2019	#MSTPaglayo				
106	"Panunuyo" (Suit)	January 28, 2019	#MSTPanunuyo	6.3%	#1		
107	"Lovers' Quarrel"	January 29, 2019	#MSTLoversQuarrel	6.5%	#1		
108	"Pagbabalik" (Comeback)	January 30, 2019	#MSTPagbabalik	6.2%	#1		
109	"Tatay Edgar"	January 31, 2019	#MSTTatayEdgar	6.9%	#1		

=== February 2019 ===
Episode		Original air date	Social media hashtag	AGB Nielsen NUTAM People			Ref.
Episode		Original air date	Social media hashtag	Audience Share	Timeslot rank	Whole day rank	Ref.
110	"Father's Love"	February 1, 2019	#MSTFathersLove	6.2%	#1		
111	"Bye Myrna"	February 4, 2019	#MSTByeMyrna	6.4%	#1		
112	"My Valentine"	February 5, 2019	#MSTMyValentine	7.1%	#1		
113	"Pagsagip" (Rescue)	February 6, 2019	#MSTPagsagip	7.0%	#1		
114	"Kutob" (Throb)	February 7, 2019	#MSTKutob	6.5%	#1		
115	"Buklod" (Bond)	February 8, 2019	#MSTBuklod	6.3%	#1		
116	"Bisto" (Bust)	February 11, 2019	#MSTBisto	6.5%	#1		
117	"Paalam, Edgar" (Goodbye, Edgar)	February 12, 2019	#MSTPaalamEdgar	6.7%	#1		
118	"Dalamhati" (Grief)	February 13, 2019	#MSTDalamhati	7.1%	#1		
119	"Luksa" (Mourn)	February 14, 2019	#MSTLuksa	6.8%	#1		
120	"Huling Sulyap" (Final Look)	February 15, 2019	#MSTHulingSulyap	6.5%	#1		
121	"My Ex"	February 18, 2019	#MSTMyEx				
122	"Last Will"	February 19, 2019	#MSTLastWill				
123	"The Past"	February 20, 2019	#MSTThePast				
124	"Imbestigasyon" (Investigation)	February 21, 2019	#MSTImbestigasyon				
125	"Huli sa Akto" (Caught in the Act)	February 22, 2019	#MSTHuliSaAkto				
126	"Moving On"	February 25, 2019	#MSTMovingOn	6.4%	#1		
127	"Truth"	February 26, 2019	#MSTTruth	5.9%	#1		
128	"Jowa Problems" (Relationship Problems)	February 27, 2019	#MSTJowaProblems	5.9%	#1		
129	"Hangover"	February 28, 2019	#MSTHangover	6.2%	#1		

=== March 2019 ===
Episode		Original air date	Social media hashtag	AGB Nielsen NUTAM People			Ref.
Episode		Original air date	Social media hashtag	Audience Share	Timeslot rank	Whole day rank	Ref.
130	"Surprise"	March 1, 2019	#MSTSurprise	6.5%	#1		
131	"BoBrey"	March 4, 2019	#MSTBoBrey	6.6%	#1		
132	"Harana" (Serenade)	March 5, 2019	#MSTHarana	5.7%	#1		
133	"Taken"	March 6, 2019	#MSTTaken	5.8%	#1		
134	"Sa Hirap at Ginhawa" (With Difficulty and Comfort)	March 7, 2019	#MSTSaHirapAtGinhawa	6.3%	#1		
135	"Double Crossed"	March 8, 2019	#MSTDoubleCrossed	6.1%	#1		
136	"Ransom"	March 11, 2019	#MSTRansom				
137	"Paninindigan" (Allegation)	March 12, 2019	#MSTPaninindigan				
138	"Takas" (Escape)	March 13, 2019	#MSTTakas				
139	"Mastermind"	March 14, 2019	#MSTMastermind				
140	"Dakip" (Catch)	March 15, 2019	#MSTDakip				
141	"Sakdal" (Accused)	March 18, 2019	#MSTSakdal				
142	"Ebidensya" (Evidence)	March 19, 2019	#MSTEbidensya				
143	"Bagong Ebidensya" (New Evidence)	March 20, 2019	#MSTBagongEbidensya				
144	"Eskapo" (Escape)	March 21, 2019	#MSTEskapo				
145	"Positive"	March 22, 2019	#MSTPositive				
146	"Huling Lunes" (Final Monday)	March 25, 2019	#MSTHulingLunes				
147	"Huling Martes" (Final Tuesday)	March 26, 2019	#MSTHulingMartes				
148	"Huling Miyerkules" (Final Wednesday)	March 27, 2019	#MSTHulingMiyerkules				
149	"Huling Huwebes" (Final Thursday)	March 28, 2019	#MSTHulingHuwebes				
150	"The Special Finale"	March 29, 2019	#MSTTheSpecialFinale	6.9%	#1		
