= List of Hanggang sa Dulo ng Buhay Ko episodes =

Hanggang sa Dulo ng Buhay Ko (International title: Obsession / transl. Until the End of My Life) is a 2019 Philippine television drama horror series broadcast by GMA Network. It premiered on the network's Afternoon Prime and Sabado Star Power sa Hapon line up and worldwide on GMA Pinoy TV on July 22, to October 19, 2019, replacing Dragon Lady.

== Series overview ==
Month	Episodes	Monthly averages
Month	Episodes	NUTAM
July 2019	9	5.6%
August 2019	27	5.3%
September 2019	25	5.7%
October 2019	17	5.7%
Total	78	5.6%

== Episodes ==
=== July 2019 ===
Episode		Original air date	Social media hashtag	AGB Nielsen NUTAM People in Television Homes		Ref.
Episode		Original air date	Social media hashtag	Rating	Timeslot rank	Ref.
1	"Pilot"	July 22, 2019	#HanggangSaDuloNgBuhayKo	5.0%	#2	
2	"Ang Paghaharap" (transl. The Confrontation)	July 23, 2019	#HDBAngPaghaharap	5.4%	#2	
3	"Engagement"	July 24, 2019	#HDBKEngagement	5.7%	#2	
4	"Kasal Sakalan" (transl. Choking In The Wedding)	July 25, 2019	#HDBKKasalSakalan	6.0%	#2	
5	"Kamatayan" (transl. Death)	July 26, 2019	#HDBKKamatayan	5.4%	#2	
6	"The Haunted Home"	July 27, 2019	#HDBKTheHauntedHome	5.8%	#2	
7	"House Blessing"	July 29, 2019	#HDBKHouseBlessing	5.9%	#2	
8	"Ang Babaeng Nakapula" (transl. The Woman in Red)	July 30, 2019	#HDBKAngBabaengNakapula	5.5%	#2	
9	"Santino's Drawing"	July 31, 2019	#HDBKSantinosDrawing	5.4%	#2	

=== August 2019 ===
Episode		Original air date	Social media hashtag	AGB Nielsen NUTAM People in Television Homes		Ref.
Episode		Original air date	Social media hashtag	Rating	Timeslot rank	Ref.
10	"Imaginary Friend"	August 1, 2019	#HDBKImaginaryFriend	5.8%	#2	
11	"Malikmata" (transl. Illusion)	August 2, 2019	#HDBKMalikMata	5.6%	#2	
12	"Stairway to Hell"	August 3, 2019	#HDBKStairwayToHell	5.4%	#2	
13	"Prank Caller"	August 5, 2019	#HDBKPrankCaller	5.4%	#2	
14	"Kiss of Death"	August 6, 2019	#HDBKKissOfDeath	5.0%	#2	
15	"Ghosting Mistress"	August 7, 2019	#HDBKGhostingMistress	5.9%	#2	
16	"Duda ni Yvie" (transl. Doubt of Yvie)	August 8, 2019	#HDBKDudaNiYvie	6.0%	#1	
17	"Pagtatapat" (transl. Confession)	August 9, 2019	#HDBKConfession	6.7%	#1	
18	"Sexy Time"	August 10, 2019	#HDBKSexyTime	6.0%	#2	
19	"Maling Akala" (transl. Wrong Thought)	August 12, 2019	#HDBKMalingAkala	6.1%	#2	
20	"Selfie"	August 13, 2019	#HDBKSelfie	6.0%	#1	
21	"Sugod, Yvie" (transl. Dash, Yvie)	August 14, 2019	#HDBKSugodYvie	6.0%	#2	
22	"Pagtutuos" (transl. Reckoning)	August 15, 2019	#HDBKPagtutuos	5.8%	#1	
23	"Rebelasyon" (transl. Revelation)	August 16, 2019	#HDBKRebelasyon	6.4%	#2	
24	"Katotohanan" (transl. Truth)	August 17, 2019	#HDBKKatotohanan	6.5%	#1	
25	"Halusinasyon" (transl. Hallucination)	August 19, 2019	#HDBKHalusinasyon	4.8%	#2	
26	"Yvie is Naomi"	August 20, 2019	#HDBKYvieIsNaomi	5.0%	#2	
27	"Totoong Kulay" (transl. True Color)	August 21, 2019	#HDBKTotoongKulay	5.7%	#2	
28	"Independence Day"	August 22, 2019	#HDBKIndependenceDay	5.0%	#2	
29	"Sindakin si Yvie" (transl. Frighten Yvie)	August 23, 2019	#HDBKSindakinSiYvie	5.6%	#2	
30	"Bingit ng Kamatayan" (transl. Brink of Death)	August 24, 2019	#HDBKBingitNgKamatayan	5.7%	#2	
31	"Santino's Truth"	August 26, 2019	#HDBKSantinosTruth	5.7%	#2	
32	"Alaala ni Naomi" (transl. Naomi's Memory)	August 27, 2019	#HDBKAlaalaNiNaomi	5.7%	#2	
33	"Banta ni Naomi" (transl. Threat of Naomi)	August 28, 2019	#HDBKBantaNiNaomi	5.9%	#2	
34	"Exorcism"	August 29, 2019	#HDBKExorcism	5.9%	#2	
35	"Anak ng Multo" (transl. Child of Ghost)	August 30, 2019	#HDBKAnakNgMulto	5.3%	#2	
36	"Ganti" (transl. Revenge)	August 31, 2019	#HDBKGanti	5.0%	#2	

=== September 2019 ===
Episode		Original air date	Social media hashtag	AGB Nielsen NUTAM People in Television Homes		Ref.
Episode		Original air date	Social media hashtag	Rating	Timeslot rank	Ref.
37	"Ang Pagbabalik" (transl. The Return)	September 2, 2019	#HDBKAngPagbabalik	5.0%	#2	
38	"Paalam" (transl. Goodbye)	September 3, 2019	#HDBKPaalam	4.9%	#2	
39	"Luksa" (transl. Mourn)	September 4, 2019	#HDBKLuksa	5.0%	#2	
40	"Dalamhati" (transl. Grief)	September 5, 2019	#HDBKDalamhati	5.6%	#2	
41	"Ampon" (transl. Adopted)	September 6, 2019	#HDBKAmpon	5.7%	#2	
42	"Stow Away"	September 7, 2019	#HDBKStowAway	—N/a		
43	"Family Feud"	September 9, 2019	#HDBKFamilyFeud	5.7%	#2	
44	"Sanib" (transl. Possess)	September 10, 2019	#HDBKSanib	5.7%	#2	
45	"Reflection"	September 11, 2019	#HDBKReflection	5.8%	#2	
46	"Seduction"	September 12, 2019	#HDBKSeduction	5.4%	#2	
47	"Mapagkunwari" (transl. Hypocrite)	September 13, 2019	#HDBKMapagkunwari	5.6%	#2	
48	"Adora vs. Yvie"	September 14, 2019	#HDBKAdoraVsYvie	—N/a		
49	"Deadly Kiss"	September 16, 2019	#HDBKDeadlyKiss	6.0%	#2	
50	"Buking" (transl. Caught)	September 17, 2019	#HDBKBuking	5.6%	#2	
51	"Victim of Love"	September 18, 2019	#HDBKVictimOfLove	5.9%	#1	
52	"Walang Kawala" (transl. No Escape)	September 19, 2019	#HDBKWalangKawala	5.8%	#2	
53	"Forbidden Affair"	September 20, 2019	#HDBKForbiddenAffair	5.6%	#2	
54	"Balatkayo" (transl. Disguise)	September 21, 2019	#HDBKBalatkayo	—N/a		
55	"Seduction"	September 23, 2019	#HDBKSeduction	5.8%	#1	
56	"Selos" (transl. Envy)	September 24, 2019	#HDBKSelos	5.7%	#1	
57	"Galit ni Naomi" (transl. Naomi's Anger)	September 25, 2019	#HDBKGalitNiNaomi	6.0%	#2	
58	"Bayaning Baliw" (transl. Crazy Hero)	September 26, 2019	#HDBKBayaningBaliw	6.0%	#2	
59	"Big Reveal"	September 27, 2019	#HDBKBigReveal	6.0%	#2	
60	"Bilin" (transl. Order)	September 28, 2019	#HDBKBilin	—N/a		
61	"Sanib Pwersa" (transl. Join Forces)	September 30, 2019	#HDBKSanibPwersa	6.2%	#2	

=== October 2019 ===
Episode		Original air date	Social media hashtag	AGB Nielsen NUTAM People in Television Homes		Ref.
Episode		Original air date	Social media hashtag	Rating	Timeslot rank	Ref.
62	"Naomi Returns"	October 1, 2019	#HDBKNaomiReturns	6.0%	#2	
63	"Confession"	October 2, 2019	#HDBKConfession	5.4%	#2	
64	"Confrontation"	October 3, 2019	#HDBKConfrontation	5.8%	#2	
65	"Dead End"	October 4, 2019	#HDBKDeadEnd	5.5%	#2	
66	"Pagtatakwil" (transl. Repudiation)	October 5, 2019	#HDBKPagtatakwil	—N/a		
67	"Soul Thief"	October 7, 2019	#HDBKSoulThief	5.6%	#2	
68	"Multong Kabit" (transl. Ghost Mistress)	October 8, 2019	#HDBKMultongKabit	5.1%	#2	
69	"Kutob" (transl. Heartbeat)	October 9, 2019	#HDBKKutob	5.2%	#2	
70	"Poot" (transl. Anger)	October 10, 2019	#HDBKPoot	5.5%	#2	
71	"Lason" (transl. Poison)	October 11, 2019	#HDBKLason	5.8%	#2	
72	"Maitim na Balak" (transl. Dark Plot)	October 12, 2019	#HDBKMaitimNaBalak	—N/a		
73	"Chasing Death"	October 14, 2019	#HDBKChasingDeath	5.4%	#2	
74	"Captured"	October 15, 2019	#HDBKCaptured	5.4%	#2	
75	"Huling Apat na Araw" (transl. Final 4 Days)	October 16, 2019	#HDBKHulingApatNaAraw	5.0%	#2	
76	"Anak ng Multo" (transl. Child of a Ghost)	October 17, 2019	#HDBKAnakNgMulto	5.9%	#2	
77	"Naomi vs. Yvie"	October 18, 2019	#HDBKNaomiVsYvie	6.4%	#2	
78	"Dulo ng Buhay Ko" (transl. End of My Life)	October 19, 2019	#HDBKDuloNgBuhayKo	6.7%	#2	
