= Markki Stroem =

Filipino-Norwegian actor and singer (born 1987)

- Born: Marcello Angelo Stroem; 21 March 1987 (age 39); Philippines
- Genres: Contemporary jazz, jazz pop, pop, R&B
- Occupations: Singer-songwriter, TV and radio personality, theater, TV and movie actor, producer, director, arranger and 2024 Mr. Universe 4th Runner Up
- Instruments: Vocals, Piano, Saxophone
- Years active: 2011–present
- Labels: Star Music (2011); Cornerstone Music (2012–present); Star Magic (2011–2018)

Markki Stroem (born March 21, 1987) is a Filipino-Norwegian actor, singer, songwriter, director, and producer. He became known as a finalist on the first season of ABS-CBN's Pilipinas Got Talent.

He graduated with honors from the Glion Institute of Higher Education in Switzerland, earning a Bachelor of Arts in Hospitality and Marketing Management.

Stroem was the 4th runner-up for Mr. Universe 2024. He hosts the radio talk show The Morning Rush on Monster RX93.1.

== Theatre and Film/TV ==
Stroem's theater credits include the roles of Henry in Next To Normal (Atlantis, 2011), Shane Gray in Camp Rock (Repertory, 2012), Tommy Ross in Carrie: The Musical (Atlantis, 2013), Leading Man in Kung Paano Ako Naging Leading Lady (Dalanghita prod, 2015), Tommy DeVito in Jersey Boys (Atlantis, 2016), Gabby in Awitin Mo at Isasayaw ko (Ballet Philippines, 2016), Claude Hooper Bukowski in Hair (Repertory, 2017), Terry Connor in Side Show (Atlantis, 2018), and Joe Pitt in Angels in America (Atlantis, 2019).

His film and TV credits include the roles of Kyle in the kids TV series Wako Wako (ABS-CBN, 2012) and Elle in Slumber Party (Cinema One Originals Awards, 2012). His most recent role is Norman in Lolo and the Kid (Netflix, 2024).

Stroem was nominated at the Cinema One Originals Awards, the Golden Screen Award, the Gawad Tangi, and the PMPC Star Awards for Movies. His 2013 Metro Manila Film Festival entry garnered 14 awards at the 39th annual Metro Manila Film Festival movie awards, including best movie. He was also nominated for a Gawad Buhay award for his performance as Claude Hooper Bukowski in Hair (Repertory, 2017).

== Music ==
Stroem produced and directed the following music videos: Rachelle Ann Go’s “Whispered Fear,” Christian Bautista and Neocolours’ “Sasabihin,” and Noel Cabangon's “Tuwing Umuulan at Kapiling Ka.” He is also the director and co-producer of his singles “Steal Your Soul” and “Thousands of Pieces.” Stroem's music video “Beautiful Tragic Memory” stars actor Nacho Tambunting and is directed by Kenneth Amparo.

Stroem released his first solo album, "Thousands of Pieces," under Cornerstone Music.

He also participated in ASAP, Boys R Boys (BRB), and the Guillermo Mendoza Box Office Awards, winning the Most Promising Male Group award.

== Personal life ==
In 2022, Stroem publicly came out as demisexual.

== Filmography ==
=== Theater ===
Year	Title	Role
2011	Next to Normal	Henry
2012	Camp Rock the Musical	Shane Gray
2013	Carrie: The Musical	Tommy Ross
2015	Kung Paano Ako Naging Leading Lady	Leading Man
2016	Jersey Boys	Tommy de Vito
2016	Awitin Mo At Isasayaw Ko	Gabby
2017	Hair	Claude Hooper Bukowski
2018	SideShow	Terry Connor
2019	Angels in America: Millennium Approaches	Joe Pitt
2022	Mula Sa Buwan	Christian
2023	Sound of Music	Rolf
2023	Contra Mundum	Charlie Dacanay
2024	Rent	Benny & Collins
2024	Little Shop of Horrors	Orin

=== Film ===
Year	Film	Role
2012	Slumber Party	Elmer Buenaventura
2013	Amor Y Muerte	Diego
2013	Raketeros	Paolo
2013	10,000 Hours	Mark Alcaraz
2015	Halik Sa Hangin	Edsel
2015	Buy Now, Die Later	Josh
2016	Ang Hapis at Himagsik ni Hermano Puli	Lt.Col Juet
2018	I Love You, Hater	Antoni
2020	Unlocked: Andrew & Brix	Andrew
2024	Lolo and the Kid	Norman

=== Television ===
Year	Title	Role
2011–2014	ASAP	Himself
2011	Luv Crazy	Whammy
2012	Wako Wako	Kyle
2013	Maalaala Mo Kaya: Seven Days	Clarence
2014	Mars Ravelo's Dyesebel	Ablon
2014	Maalaala Mo Kaya	
2015	Kapamilya Deal or No Deal	Briefcase Number 17
2016	Doble Kara	Frank
2016	We Love OPM!	Himself
2019	Tawag Ng Tanghalan Celebrity Edition	Himself
2019	MMK Not My Dignity	Mark
2021	Love At The End of The World	Mark Anthony Handang
2022	My Delivery Gurl	Bingo

== Discography ==
- Pilipinas You Got It, Star Records 2011
- Thousands of Pieces, Cornerstone Music 2012
