= Slay (TV series) =

2025 Philippine television drama series

- Title card
- Also known as: Slay: 'Til Death Do Us Part
- Genre: Crime; Drama; Mystery
- Created by: R.J. Nuevas; Ken De Leon
- Written by: Ken De Leon; Glay Ramirez; Ana Aleta Nadela; Meryl Bunyi; Abner Tulagan
- Directed by: Rod Marmol; Jules Katanyag
- Creative director: Aloy Adlawan
- Starring: Julie Anne San Jose; Gabbi Garcia; Mikee Quintos; Ysabel Ortega; Derrick Monasterio
- Country of origin: Philippines
- Original language: Tagalog
- No. of episodes: 40 (Viu); 48 (GMA Network)

Production
- Executive producer: Nieva Magpayo
- Camera setup: Multiple-camera setup
- Running time: 21–39 minutes
- Production company: GMA Entertainment Group

Original release
- Network: Viu
- Release: March 3 – May 8, 2025
- Network: GMA Network
- Release: March 24 – June 13, 2025

Slay is a 2025 Philippine television drama crime mystery series streaming on Viu and broadcast by GMA Network. Directed by Rod Marmol and Jules Katanyag, it stars Julie Anne San Jose, Gabbi Garcia, Mikee Quintos, Ysabel Ortega and Derrick Monasterio. The series first premiered on Viu on March 3, 2025. The final episode was released on May 8, 2025, for a total of 40 episodes.

The television broadcast consisting of additional episodes with a different story narrative, premiered on March 24, 2025 on GMA Network's Prime line up. The series concluded its television run on June 13, 2025, with a total of 48 episodes.

The series is also streaming online on YouTube.

== Premise ==
Four women – Liv, Yana, Sugar, and Amelie — become entangled in a series of events following the death of fitness influencer Zach.

== Cast and characters ==
Cast

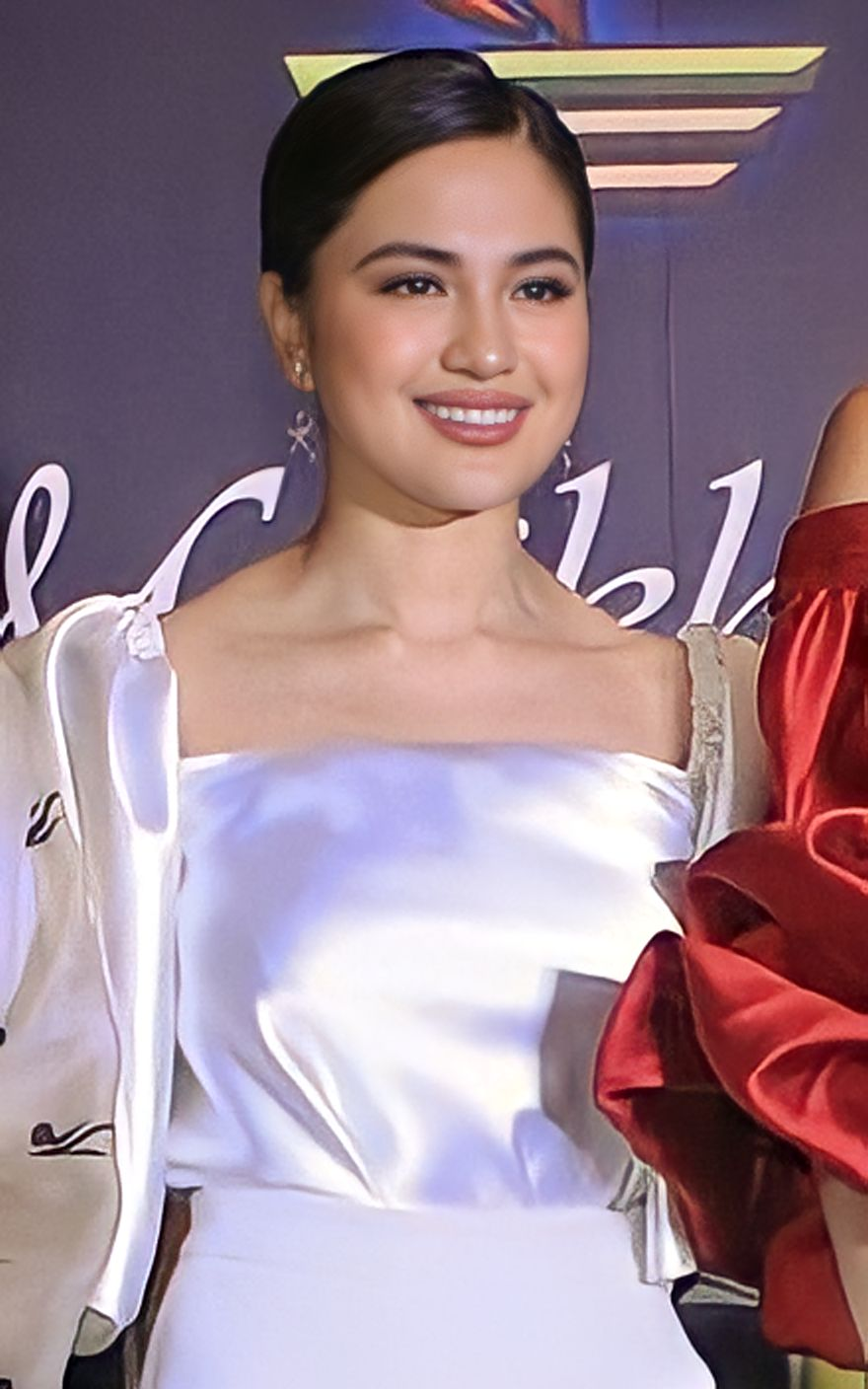
Julie Anne San Jose

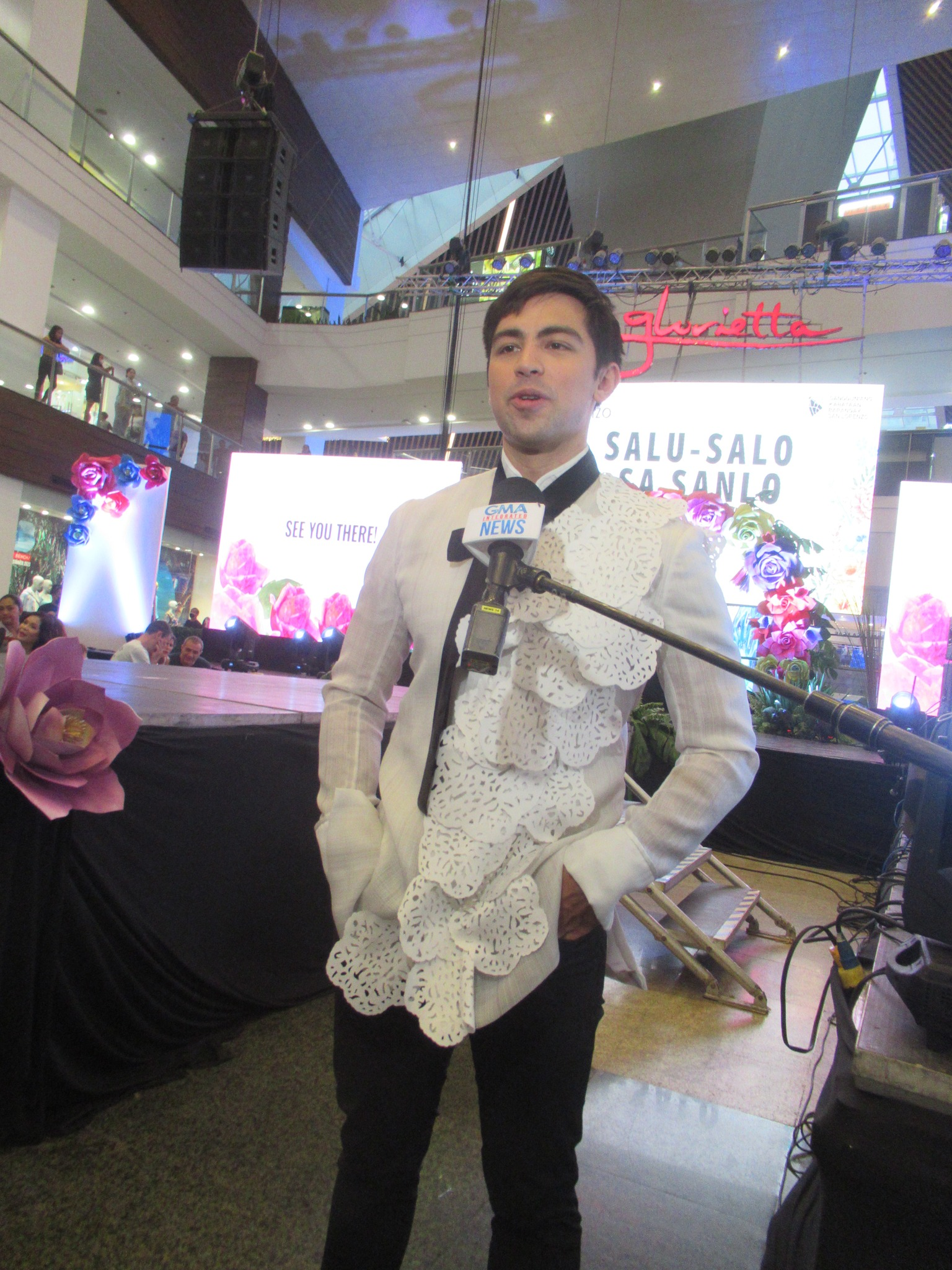
Derrick Monasterio

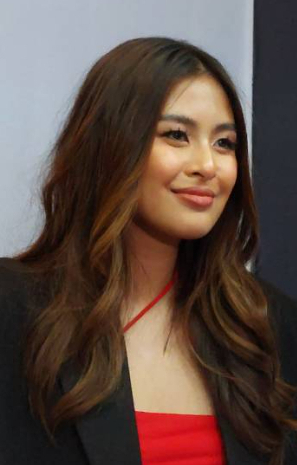
Gabbi Garcia

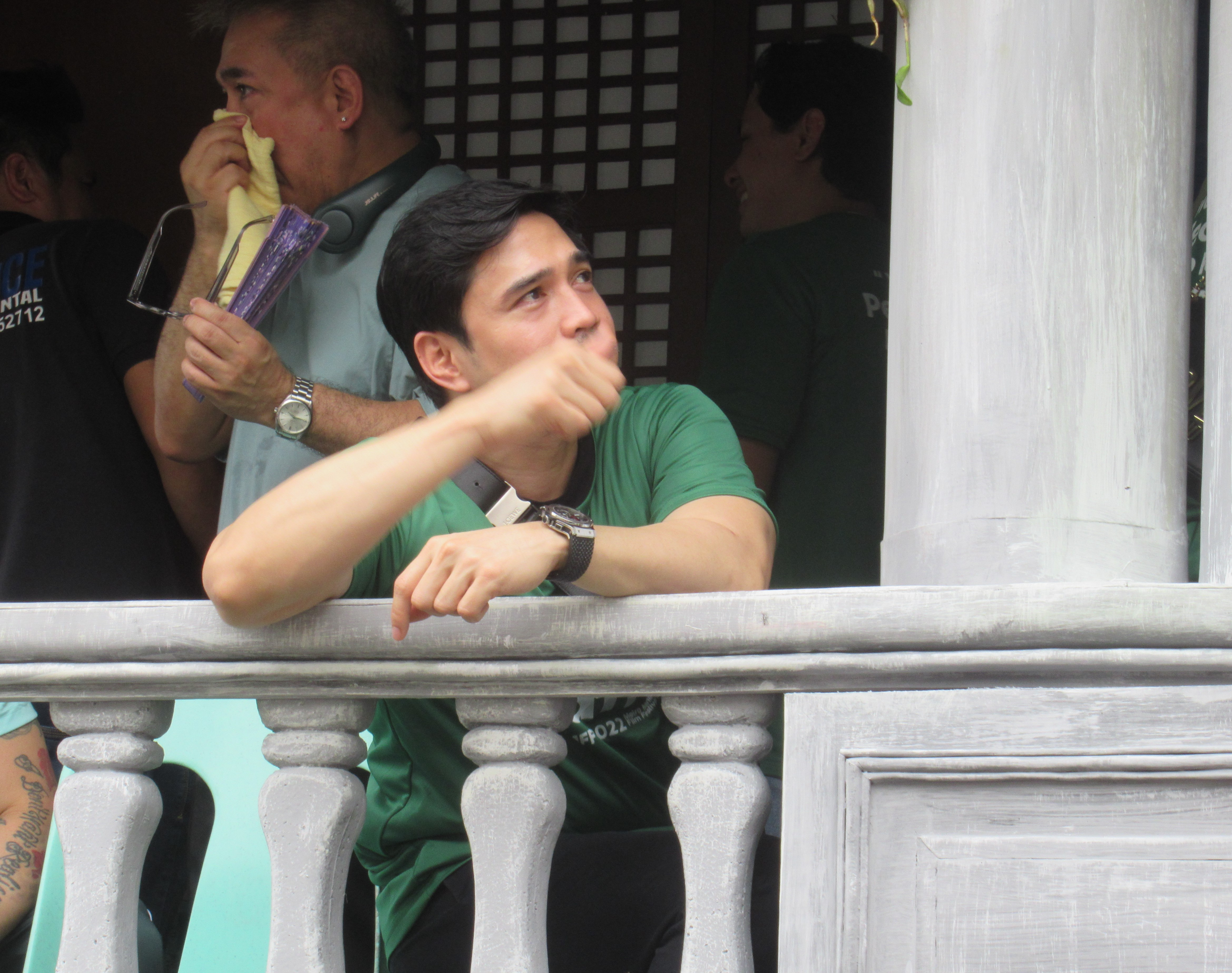
James Blanco

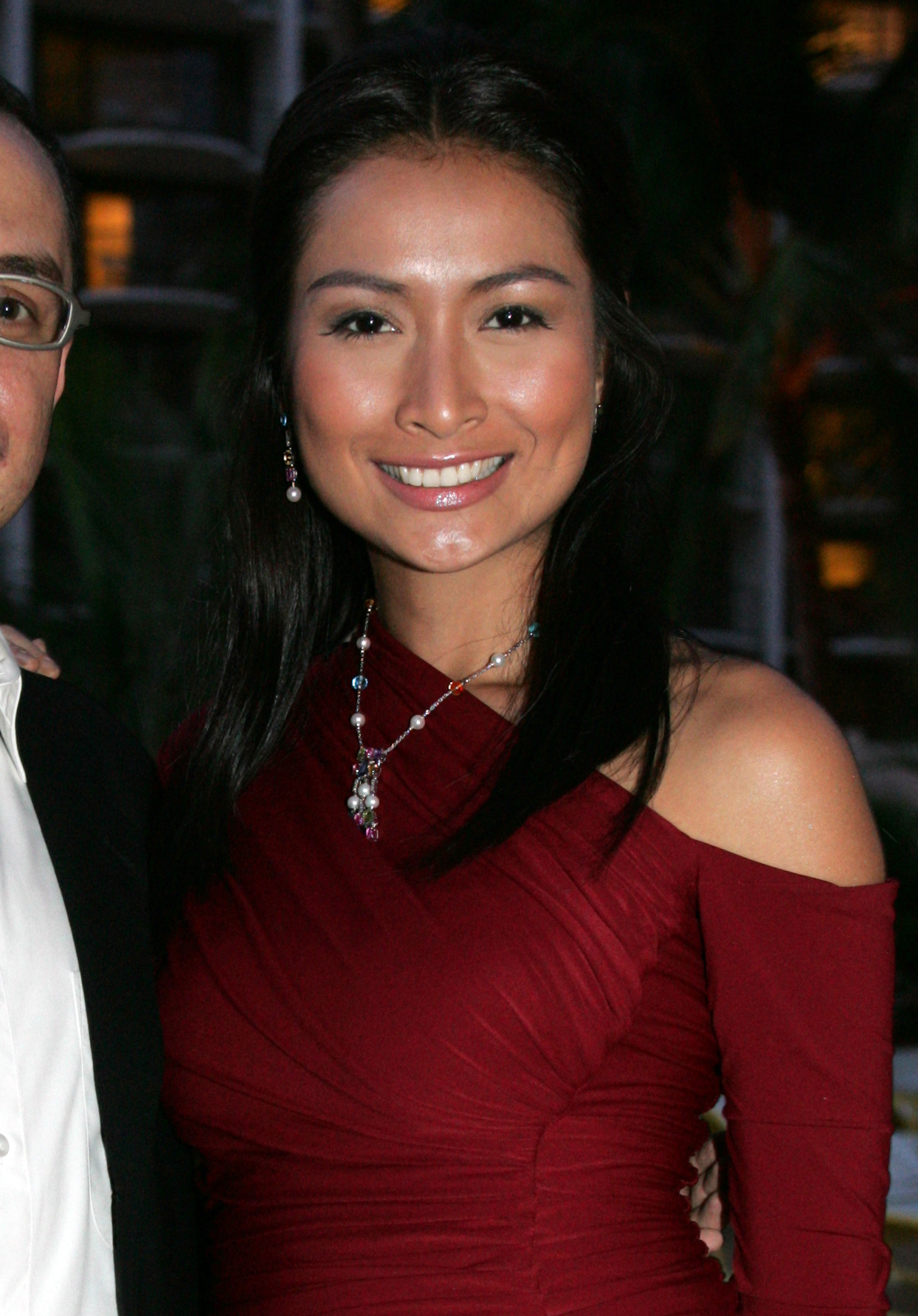
Phoemela Baranda

Lead cast

- Julie Anne San Jose as Olivia "Liv" Baltazar
- Gabbi Garcia as Amelie "A" Baltazar
- Mikee Quintos as Sugar Alvarez
- Ysabel Ortega as Yana Chua
- Derrick Monasterio as Zach Zamora

Supporting cast

- Bernard Palanca as Lenard Zamora
- James Blanco as Hector Baltazar
- Phoemela Baranda as Margarita "Marga" Baltazar
- Chuckie Dreyfus as Charlie Chua
- Simon Ibarra as Roldan Alvarez
- Tina Paner as Lourdes Alvarez
- Jay Ortega as Gabo
- Matet de Leon as Leona
- Royce Cabrera as Juro Catapang
- Gil Cuerva as Luke
- Nikki Co as Kirby Manabat

== Episodes ==
Slay episodes
No.	Title	Original release date
1	"Burnt Alive"	March 3, 2025
2	"Suspicious Death"	March 4, 2025
3	"Evidence"	March 5, 2025
4	"Threaten"	March 6, 2025
5	"Foul Play"	March 10, 2025
6	"Investigation"	March 11, 2025
7	"The Funeral"	March 12, 2025
8	"Suspicious"	March 13, 2025
9	"Stop Investigation"	March 17, 2025
10	"Mysterious Events"	March 18, 2025
11	"Tension"	March 19, 2025
12	"Evidence"	March 20, 2025
13	"Suspicion Continues"	March 24, 2025
14	"Crucial Clue"	March 25, 2025
15	"Tea Tree Oil"	March 26, 2025
16	"Hidden Laptop"	March 27, 2025
17	"Family Tensions"	March 31, 2025
18	"Betrayals"	April 1, 2025
19	"Leaked Video"	April 2, 2025
20	"Heartbreak"	April 3, 2025
21	"Past Betrayals"	April 7, 2025
22	"Suspect"	April 8, 2025
23	"Breaking Down"	April 9, 2025
24	"Audio Proof"	April 10, 2025
25	"Sugar’s Past"	April 14, 2025
26	"Conflicts Rises"	April 15, 2025
27	"Revenge"	April 16, 2025
28	"Hidden Motives"	April 17, 2025
29	"Byron’s Lover"	April 24, 2025
30	"Confrontation"	April 25, 2025
31	"Poisoned Eyedrops"	April 26, 2025
32	"The Truth"	April 27, 2025
33	"Dangerous Blackmail"	April 28, 2025
34	"Shattered Trust"	April 29, 2025
35	"Truth Threatens"	April 30, 2025
36	"Secrets Exposed"	May 1, 2025
37	"Danger Looms"	May 5, 2025
38	"Chaos"	May 6, 2025
39	"Painful Confessions"	May 7, 2025
40	"New Beginnings"	May 8, 2025

== Release ==
Slay premiered on March 3, 2025 on Viu and consisted of 40 episodes. The television broadcast premiered on March 24, 2025, on GMA Network's Prime line up. According to GMA Network's executive, Annette Gozon-Valdes – the television broadcast would consist of more episodes and a different narrative ending.

== Reception ==
=== Ratings ===
According to AGB Nielsen Philippines' Nationwide Urban Television Audience Measurement People in television homes, the pilot episode of Slay earned a 5.2% rating on GMA Network. The series received its highest rating on March 27, 2025, with a 5.3% rating.

=== Critical response ===
Je CC of LionhearTV complimented the cast and direction of the series, stating its quality and vibe is "rare" for a Philippine television series. Charles Cabrera and Shaine Dayrit of Pulp, both stated the series "offers a fresh take on the murder mystery genre, blending suspense with a modern, fast-paced narrative", and complimented the series' character-driven narrative.
