= Jay Ortega =

Filipino actor and model

- Born: January 8, 2002 (age 24); Philippines
- Occupations: Actor, model
- Years active: 2022–present
- Agent: Sparkle GMA Artist Center
- Known for: Pulang Araw as Akio Watanabe

Jay Ortega (born January 8, 2002) is a Filipino actor and model affiliated with Sparkle GMA Artist Center. He is best known for his role as Akio Watanabe in the television series Pulang Araw and for his performances in Slay as Gabo and Pepito Manaloto: Tuloy ang Kuwento as Jasper. His rising popularity in Philippine television has earned him critical attention and a nomination for TV Supporting Actor of the Year (Primetime) at the 6th Village Pipol Choice Awards.

== Early life ==
Jay Ortega was born on January 8, 2002, in the Philippines. Details about his early life and education remain limited in public sources.

== Career ==
=== Breakthrough role ===
Ortega's acting debut in Pulang Araw garnered significant attention. Portraying the character Akio Watanabe, his performance showcased his range and ability to connect with viewers, marking him as a promising newcomer in Philippine television.

=== Subsequent projects ===
Following his breakthrough, Ortega took on additional roles, including:

Slay (2025): Ortega appears in this contemporary drama series as Gabo.

Pepito Manaloto: Tuloy ang Kuwento (2025): In this installment of the long-running comedy series, he portrays Jasper.

Magpakailanman: Viral Gay Guard: The Gerald Concan Story (2025): Ortega played the role of Gerald.

Encantadia Chronicles: Sang'gre (2025): Ortega Portray the role of Alipato.

In addition to his television work, Ortega has made notable appearances at public events, including fashion shows such as the BENCH Body of Work.

=== Recognition ===
Ortega was nominated as TV Supporting Actor of the Year (Primetime) at the 6th Village Pipol Choice Awards.

== Filmography ==
=== Television ===
Television Appearances
Year	Title	Role
2023–2025	TiktoClock	Himself - Guest
2024	Pulang Araw	Akio Watanabe
2024	Family Feud	Himself - Guest Player
2024	Fast Talk with Boy Abunda	Himself - Guest
2024–2025	The Boobay and Tekla Show	Himself - Guest
2025	Pepito Manaloto: Tuloy ang Kuwento	Jasper
2025	Magpakailanman: Viral Gay Guard: The Gerald Concan Story	Gerald Concan
2025	Slay	Gabo
2025	Lutong Bahay	Himself - Guest
2025	Maka	Kuya
2025	Tadhana: Boss Yaya	Danny
2025	Encantadia Chronicles: Sang'gre	Alipato
2026	Kamao	Joel
2026	Taskforce Firewall	Carl

=== Films ===
Films appearance
Year	Title	Role
2025	Samahan ng mga Makasalanan	Junyor

== Personal life ==
Beyond his acting career, Ortega has been featured in several media events and fashion shows.

== Awards and nominations ==
Awards and Nominations
Year	Award	Category	Result
2024	Village Pipol Choice Awards	TV Supporting Actor of the Year (Primetime)	Nominated
