= Euwenn Mikaell =

Filipino actor (born 2013)

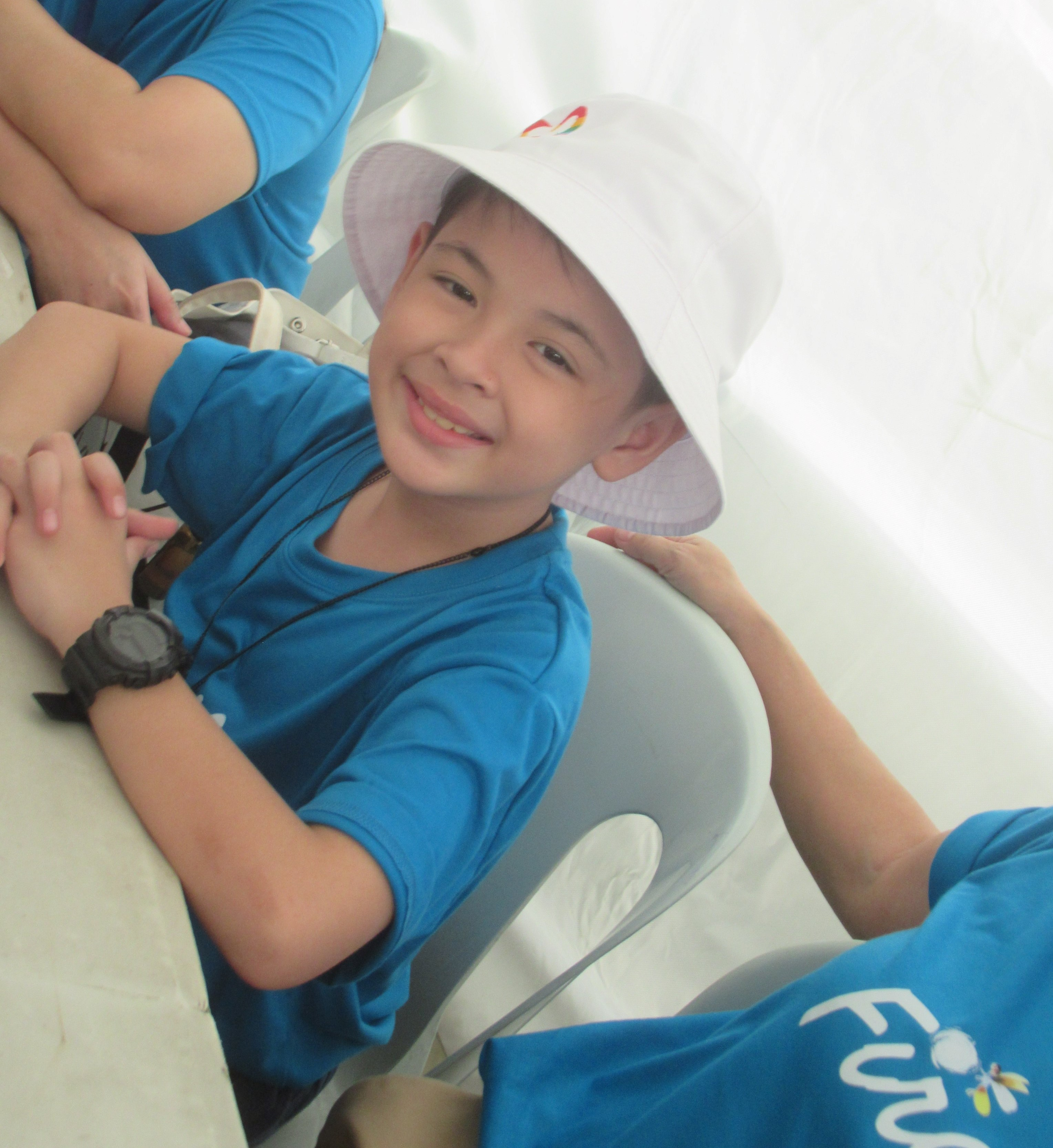
- Aleta in 2023
- Born: Euwenn Mikaell Carreon Aleta; January 14, 2013 (age 13); Meycauayan, Bulacan, Philippines
- Occupation: Actor
- Years active: 2016–present
- Agent: Sparkle GMA Artist Center (2019-present)

Euwenn Mikaell Carreon Aleta (born January 14, 2013) is a Filipino actor. He is best known for his portrayal of the title character of "Tonton" in the drama film Firefly, and as Kid in Lolo and the Kid.

== Early life and education ==
Aleta was born on January 14, 2013, in Meycauayan, Bulacan to a Filipina mother Cristal Carreon and father, Michael Aleta. He grew up at Barangays Saluysoy and Bayugo, Meycauayan and Marilao. His mother in Instagram revealed she lifted his name from 'You Win' which perfectly rhymes with "Euwenn". She clarified that in the 1990s she expertly plays Tekken during her pregnancy and she always shouts 'You Win'.

He studied elementary education at Meycauayan West Central Integrated School in Hulo, Meycauayan, Bulacan. He was also home schooled at The Cardinal Academy Inc. in Barangay Pandayan, Meycauayan. He finished elementary school in 2025.

== Career ==
In 2016, at 3 years old, Aleta starred in an episode of Magpakailanman, "Finding Earl: The Dollente Family Story". In 2017, he appeared in Someone to Watch Over Me, Destined to Be Yours, and the Magpakailanman episode "Justice for the Battered Child: The Linda Cagalitan Story".

In 2018, he starred in Magpakailanman: Nakawin natin ang sandali as Melchor & Kuya na, nanay pa: The Alexis Peralta Story as Young Aljur, in The One That Got Away as Nemo Makalintal and in Magpakailanman: Ang munting bayani: The Little Boy Edmund Jon Nipay Story as EJ & Anak mo, anak ko, anak natin as Young Ramram.

In 2019, he starred in the Philippine television drama One of the Baes for GMA Network as guest cast "Jun-Jun", in Cain at Abel, as Samuel "Sammy" T. Ledesma, in "Magpakailanman:" Yaya Dubai and I as "Mody", in Hanggang sa Dulo ng Buhay Ko as Santino "Santy" Cardeñas- Divinagracia/Matteo Espiritu- Divinagracia Jr., in Magpakailanman: Bata, bata: Kriminal o biktima as Young Marco and Yanig ng buhay: Pampanga Earthquake Victims as Jacob, and in 11 Episodes of Philippine Comedy Anthology Series Dear Uge as Nemo, and in Tadhana: Menor de edad as Jaello.

In 2020, he starred in Imbestigador: Batang Lalaki, Patay sa Bugbog! Ang Suspek, ang Kanyang Sariling Ina as Tonton.

In 2021, Aleta, as Kapuso child star, in the 11th year of Aha! in collaboration with TikTok, starred in the Battle of Wits between the AHA! Squad members.

In 2022, he starred in Imbestigador: Antipolo City Murder Case as Son & Pamangkin as JM Gascon, and in Magpakailanman: Nasaan ka, inay as Young Lorenzo.

In 2023, he starred in Magpakailanman: Viral Cancer Survivor: The Sean Beltran Story as Young Sean and Ina ka anak mo as Bugoy, in The Write One as Dex/Sep, in Nakarehas na Puso as Bombert, and in Wish Ko Lang!: Nanay, Nakisali Sa Away-Bata as Ronnie. Aleta and Sienna Stevens graced the second red carpet GMA Gala 2023 with the theme "Elegant Formal" at the Marriott Grand Ballroom in Newport World Resorts. Aleta won the Best Child Performer award for his first leading film Firefly in the 2023 Metro Manila Film Festival, making him the youngest-ever winner in that category. For that same film, he also won the 72nd FAMAS Awards on May 26, 2024, 7:00 p.m., at the Fiesta Pavillon, Manila Hotel for Best Child Actor, his fourth major award in just six months, after winning the 2024 Box Office Entertainment Awards as Most Popular Child Performer of the Year. He won the 2024 Movie Child Performer of the Year in the 40th PMPC Star Awards for Movies at the Henry Lee Irwin Theater, Ateneo de Manila University, thus winning the Philippine movie grand slam. Aleta is one of the 48 Sparkle GMA Artist Center's 2023 "Signed for Stardom" artists.

In 2024, he portrayed Rambo in the series Forever Young, played Kid in the drama film Lolo and the Kid alongside Joel Torre, and acted as the autistic Quentin, in "My Very Special Son: The Candy Pangilinan Story" November 30 episode, establishing himself as a notable young actor in Philippine cinema.

== Personal life ==
From an early age, he has given part of his earnings to support his grandparents' grocery store. In November 2024, Aleta revealed that he has a sibling who is special needs.

Aleta attends worship services at the Iglesia ni Cristo Chapter (LocaL) in Barangays Bayugo and Saluysoy, Meycauayan.

== Filmography ==
=== Film ===
Year	Title	Role
2018	Squad Goals	Tyler
2023	Firefly	Anthony "Tonton" Alvaro
2024	Lolo and the Kid	Kid
2025	Samahan ng mga Makasalanan	Bryan
2025	P77	Jonas Caceres
2025	The Delivery Rider	
2025	Out of Order	young Alex Roman

=== Television ===
Year	Title	Role	Notes
2016	Magpakailanman	Earl	Episode: "Finding Earl: The Dollente Family Story"
2017	Someone to Watch Over Me	Joshua Chavez	
2017	Magpakailanman	John Earl	Episode: "Justice for the Battered Child: The Linda Cagalitan Story"
2017	Magpakailanman	EJ	Episode: "Ang munting bayani: The Little Boy Edmund Jon Nipay Story"
2017	Destined to be Yours	a Ring bearer	Episode: "Finale"
2017	Magpakailanman	younger Ramram	Episode: "Anak mo, anak ko, anak natin"
2018	Magpakailanman	younger Aljur	Episode: "Kuya na, nanay pa: The Alexis Peralta Story"
2018	Magpakailanman	Melchor	Episode: "Nakawin natin ang bawat sandali"
2018	The One That Got Away	Nemo Makalintal	
2018	Cain at Abel	Sammy Ledesma	
2018	My Special Tatay	younger Boyet/Angelo Mariano	
2019	Ika-5 Utos	Emilio "Thirdy" Buenaventura III	
2019	Hanggang sa Dulo ng Buhay Ko	Santino "Santy" Cardeñas Divinagracia / Matteo Espiritu Divinagracia Jr.	
2019	One of the Baes	Jun-jun	
2019	Dear Uge	Nemo	
2019	Tadhana	Jello	Episode: "Menor de Edad"
2019	Magpakailanman	younger Marco	Episode: "Bata, bata: Kriminal o biktima"
2019	Magpakailanman	Mody	Episode: "Yaya Dubai and I"
2019	Magpakailanman	Jacob	Episode: "Yanig ng buhay: Pampanga Earthquake Victims"
2022	Magpakailanman	younger Lorenzo	Episode: "Nasaan ka, inay"
2023	Nakarehas na Puso	Bombert	
2023	The Write One	Dexter "Dex" T. Herrera / Stefano "Sep" Lualhati	
2023	Magpakailanman	younger Sean	Episode: "Viral Cancer Survivor: The Sean Beltran Story"
2023	Magpakailanman	Bugoy	Episode: "Ina ka ng anak mo"
2024	Abot-Kamay na Pangarap	Andoy	
2024	Tadhana	Arbie	Episode: "Komisyon (Part 1 to 3)"
2024	Regal Studio Presents	Owen	Episode: "My Daddy Chef"
2024	Magpakailanman	younger Quentin	Episode: "My Very Special Son: The Candy Pangilinan Story"
2024	It's Showtime	Himself	
2024–2025	Forever Young	Rambo Agapito	
2025	Hating Kapatid	younger Tyrone	
2026	Kamao	younger Makmak	
2027	A Million Dreams	TBA	
TBA	Ninja The Tigers Warriors	TBA	

== Awards and nominations ==
- 2024 Most Popular Child Actor - 52nd Box Office Entertainment Awards
- 2024 Best Young Actor - 2024 Paragon Film Lokal Choice Awards
- 2024 Child Star of the Year - Platinum Stallion National Media Awards 2024, at the Trinity University of Asia.
- 2024 Nominee for the 47th Gawad Urian Award (Manunuri ng Pelikulang Pilipino) Best Actor on June 8 at the De La Salle University.
- 2024 Movie Child Performer of the Year - 40th PMPC Star Awards for Movies at thee Henry Lee Irwin Theater, Ateneo de Manila University
- 2024 Bulacan Gintong Kabataan Awards (GKA), Special Citation
