= Nakarehas na Puso =

Philippine television drama series

- Title card
- Genre: Drama
- Created by: Jimuel dela Cruz
- Written by: Tin Novicio; Jimuel dela Cruz; Onay Sales
- Directed by: Gil Tejada Jr.
- Creative director: Aloy Adlawan
- Starring: Jean Garcia
- Theme music composer: Roxy Fabian
- Opening theme: "Muling Tanggapin" by Thea Astley
- Country of origin: Philippines
- Original language: Tagalog
- No. of episodes: 80

Production
- Executive producer: Racquel Atienza-Cadsawan
- Camera setup: Multiple-camera setup
- Running time: 21–32 minutes
- Production company: GMA Entertainment Group

Original release
- Network: GMA Network
- Release: September 26, 2022 – January 13, 2023

Nakarehas na Puso (transl. jailed heart) is a Philippine television drama series broadcast by GMA Network. Directed by Gil Tejada Jr., it stars Jean Garcia. It premiered on September 26, 2022 on the network's Afternoon Prime line up. The series concluded on January 13, 2023, with a total of 80 episodes.

The series is streaming online on YouTube.

== Premise ==
Amelia Galang loses sight of her husband and four children after being jailed. When Galang gets released, she finds out that her family has broken up and her children and husband now despise her.

== Cast and characters ==
Lead cast

- Jean Garcia as Amelia Galang / Hilda Cruz

Supporting cast

- Vaness del Moral as Natalia "Lea" Galang-Divino
- EA Guzman as Ramiro Jesus "Miro" Galang
- Claire Castro as Olivia "Olive" Galang / Divine Balbastro
- Michelle Aldana as Doris Montellana
- Leandro Baldemor as Jackson "Jack" Galang
- Ashley Sarmiento as Anica Marie "Nica" G. Divino
- Bryce Eusebio as Warren Angeles
- Glenda Garcia as Vivian "V" Samonte
- Chanel Latorre as Racquel Angeles
- Analyn Barro as Charlotte Cruz-Galang
- Dang Cruz as Glory Vituda

Guest cast

- Barbara Miguel as younger Lea
- Miggs Cuaderno as younger Miro
- Cassy Lavarias as younger Olive
- Franchesco Maafi as Winston "Nonoy" Galang
- David Racelis as Ivan Divino
- Marnie Lapus as Julie Balbastro
- Kenken Nuyad as Argel
- Madeleine Nicolas as Rustica Monte
- Janna Trias as Barang
- Euwenn Mikael Aleta as Bombert
- Dennah Bautista as Bekbek
- Ynez Veneracion as Lady Mamba
- Justine Garcia as Gedaville
- Paul Ryan Aquino as Poknat

== Ratings ==
According to AGB Nielsen Philippines' Nationwide Urban Television Audience Measurement People in television homes, the pilot episode of Nakarehas na Puso earned a 7.6% rating. The final episode scored a 9.6% rating.

== Accolades ==
Accolades received by Nakarehas na Puso
Year	Award	Category	Recipient	Result	Ref.
2025	37th PMPC Star Awards for Television	Best Daytime Drama Series	Nakarehas na Puso	Pending	
