= Cain at Abel =

Philippine television drama series

- Title card
- Also known as: Color of My Blood
- Genre: Action drama
- Created by: Suzette Doctolero
- Written by: John Roque; Anna Aleta-Nadela; John Paul J. Bedia; Brylle Tabora
- Directed by: Don Michael Perez; Mark A. Reyes V; Toto Natividad
- Creative director: Roy C. Iglesias
- Starring: Dingdong Dantes; Dennis Trillo
- Opening theme: "Bulalakaw" by Agsunta
- Country of origin: Philippines
- Original language: Tagalog
- No. of episodes: 65 (list of episodes)

Production
- Executive producer: Michele R. Borja
- Editors: Robert Pancho; James Kevin Li; Mark Oliver Sison; Arturo Damaso
- Camera setup: Multiple-camera setup
- Running time: 21–53 minutes
- Production company: GMA Entertainment Group

Original release
- Network: GMA Network
- Release: November 19, 2018 – February 15, 2019

Cain at Abel (transl. Cain and Abel / international title: Color of My Blood) is a Philippine television drama action series broadcast by GMA Network. Directed by Mark A. Reyes V, it stars Dingdong Dantes and Dennis Trillo. It premiered on November 19, 2018 on the network's Telebabad line up. The series concluded on February 15, 2019, with a total of 65 episodes.

The series is streaming online on YouTube.

== Premise ==
Brothers, Daniel and Miguel grew up in different worlds as they were separated when they were kids. Daniel was raised in the city by his father, while Miguel, was taken by his mother and relocated to a fishing village where they struggled. Years later, the brothers are drawn together by their parents.

== Cast and characters ==
Cast

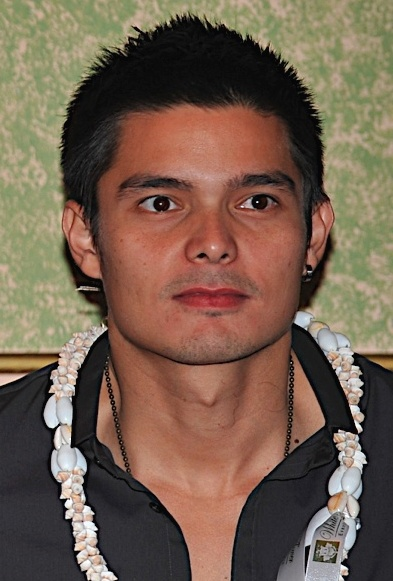
Dingdong Dantes

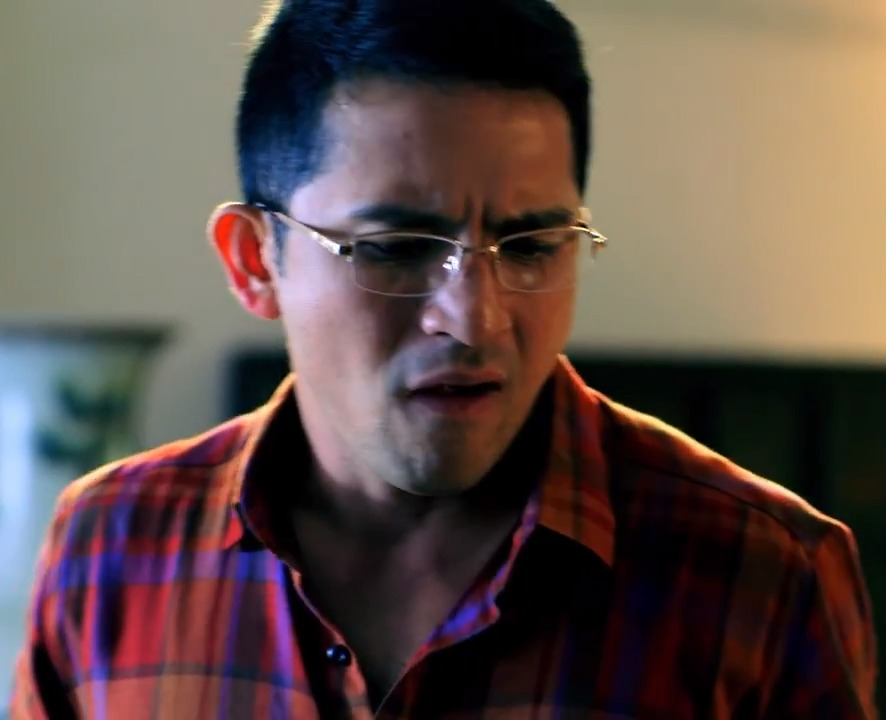
Dennis Trillo

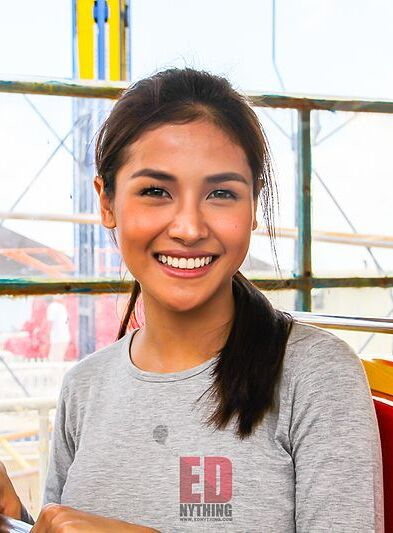
Sanya Lopez

Lead cast

- Dingdong Dantes as Daniel Anthony Larrazabal
- Dennis Trillo as Miguel Anthony Larrazabal / Elias Ledesma / Simon

Supporting cast

- Solenn Heussaff as Abigail Buenaventura
- Sanya Lopez as Margaret Tolentino
- Eddie Gutierrez as Antonio Larrazabal
- Chanda Romero as Belenita "Belen" Castillo-Larrazabal / Fe Ledesma
- Dina Bonnevie as Priscilla "Precy" Rodrigo-Larrazabal
- Ronnie Henares as Gener Buenaventura
- Boy 2 Quizon as Juancho Pelaez
- Shyr Valdez as Tina Tolentino
- Leandro Baldemor as Darius Tolentino
- Bing Pimentel as Linda Buenaventura
- Ervic Vijandre as Alex Ibarra
- Renz Fernandez as Louie Fernando
- Pauline Mendoza as Patricia "Pat" Tolentino
- Carlo Gonzales as Ronald Castro
- Vince Vandorpe as Rafael R. Larrazabal
- Djanin Cruz as Eunice

Guest cast

- Yasmien Kurdi as younger Belen
- Rafael Rosell as younger Antonio
- Diana Zubiri as younger Precy
- David Remo as younger Daniel
- Seth dela Cruz as younger Miguel
- Zachi Rivera as younger Margaret
- Ashley Cabrera as younger Abigail
- Fabio Ide as Brent Evangelista
- Ping Medina as Poldo
- Marc Abaya as Ramon
- Juan Rodrigo as Oscar Evangelista
- Sophia Senoron as Julie
- Euwenn Aleta as Samuel "Sammy" T. Ledesma
- Carlos Agassi as Gabo
- Dindo Arroyo as Jaime
- Mika Gorospe as Jackie
- Martin del Rosario as younger William
- Tommy Abuel as William Bernardino
- Emilio Garcia as Treb / Boss Treb
- Lucho Ayala as Roel
- Muriel Lomadilla as Cacai
- Ameera Johara as Sabrina
- Roi Vinzon as Diego Javellana Garcia
- Jay Arcilla as Gilbert
- Levi Ignacio as Carding
- Ina Feleo as Lucille Ibarra

== Ratings ==
According to AGB Nielsen Philippines' Nationwide Urban Television Audience Measurement People in television homes, the pilot and final episode of Cain at Abel both earned an 11.6% rating.

== Accolades ==
Accolades received by Cain at Abel
Year	Award	Category	Recipient	Result	Ref.
2019	33rd PMPC Star Awards for Television	Best Primetime TV Series	Cain at Abel	Nominated	
2019	33rd PMPC Star Awards for Television	Best Drama Actor	Dennis Trillo	Nominated	
2019	33rd PMPC Star Awards for Television	Best Drama Actor	Dingdong Dantes	Nominated	
2019	33rd PMPC Star Awards for Television	Best Child Performer	Euwenn Aleta	Nominated	
