= My Special Tatay =

Philippine television drama series

- Title card
- Also known as: The Heart Knows
- Genre: Drama
- Created by: Agnes G. Uligan
- Written by: Renei Dimla; Patrick Ilagan; Loi Argel Nova; Liberty Trinidad; Nehemiarey Dallego
- Directed by: L.A. Madridejos
- Creative director: Roy C. Iglesias
- Starring: Ken Chan
- Theme music composer: Vehnee Saturno
- Opening theme: "Kahit Man Lang sa Pangarap" by Rita Daniela
- Country of origin: Philippines
- Original language: Tagalog
- No. of episodes: 150 (list of episodes)

Production
- Executive producer: Joseph T. Aleta
- Editors: Robert Ryan Reyes; Noel Mauricio
- Camera setup: Multiple-camera setup
- Running time: 24–30 minutes
- Production company: GMA Entertainment Group

Original release
- Network: GMA Network
- Release: September 3, 2018 – March 29, 2019

My Special Tatay (transl. My Special Dad / international title: The Heart Knows) is a Philippine television drama series broadcast by GMA Network. Directed by L.A. Madridejos, it stars Ken Chan in the title role. It premiered on September 3, 2018 on the network's Afternoon Prime line up. The series concluded on March 29, 2019, with a total of 150 episodes.

The series is streaming online on YouTube.

== Premise ==
Boyet, a young man with mild intellectual disability who has a quiet and simple life with his mother, will be changed when they find out that he has a child. Despite their state in life and Boyet's condition, they will take care of the child along with the help of aunt Chona and Boyet's childhood friend, Carol.

== Cast and characters ==
Cast

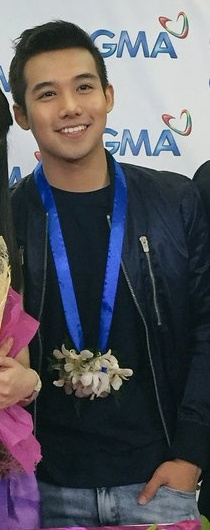
Ken Chan

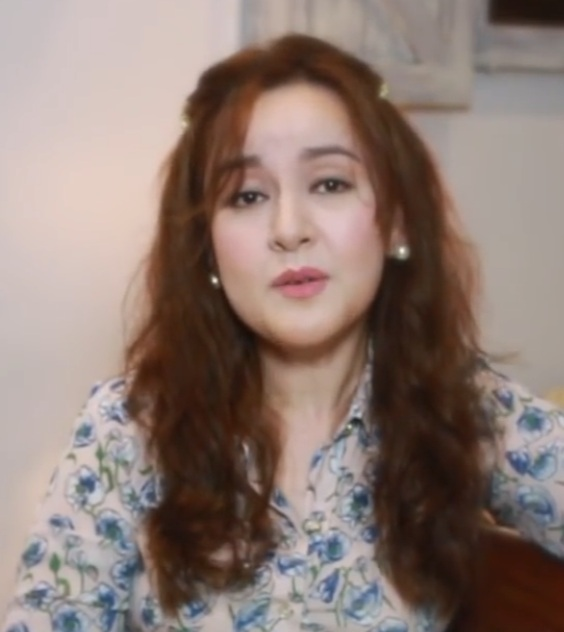
Lilet

Lead cast

- Ken Chan as Roberto "Boyet" Mariano Villaroman

Supporting cast

- Jestoni Alarcon as Edgar Villaroman
- Teresa Loyzaga as Olivia "Via" Salcedo-Villaroman
- Lilet as Isay Mariano
- Carmen Soriano as Soledad Villaroman
- Jillian Ward as Odette S. Villaroman
- Candy Pangilinan as Chona Mariano
- Arra San Agustin as Carol Flores
- Bruno Gabriel as Orville S. Villaroman

Guest cast

- John Kenneth Giducos as Deckdeck
- Phytos Ramirez as Jeff
- Cheska Diaz as Sheila Flores
- Barbara Miguel as Cindy Flores
- Rubi Rubi as Divine
- Matt Evans as younger Edgar
- Valeen Montenegro as younger Via
- Empress Schuck as younger Isay
- Ashley Rivera as younger Chona
- Dominic Roco as Peter Flores
- Elle Ramirez as younger Sheila
- Soliman Cruz as Bernardo "Obet" Mariano
- Kyle Ocampo as Eunice
- Johnny Revilla as Faustino Salcedo
- Lito Legaspi as Simon Villaroman
- Bryce Eusebio as teenage Boyet
- Euwenn Aleta as younger Boyet / Angelo L. Mariano
- Dayara Shane as teenage Carol
- Rita Daniela as Susan "Aubrey" P. Labrador-Mariano
- Mikoy Morales as Joselito "Ote" Mendiola
- Jhoana Marie Tan as Britney
- Jazz Ocampo as Erika Roque
- Kristine Abbey as Annie
- Joemarie Nielsen as Bert
- Cyruzz King as Paeng
- Angeli Bayani as Myrna Palomares Labrador
- ER Villa as baby Angelo L. Mariano
- Arny Ross as Monique Roque
- Agimat Maguigad, Cajo Tan, Clint Limbas, JR Palero and Rommel Calupitan as the Katambays
- Alchris Galura as Joel Dimaano
- Jon Romano as Rudy Flores
- Kiel Rodriguez as Dan
- Bernard Vios as Xander
- Frances Makil-Ignacio as Mamita
- Ayra Mariano as Anna
- Tonio Quiazon as Antonio Aguilar
- Lou Veloso as Miong
- Martin del Rosario as Gardo Guzman
- Jervi Cajarop as Bogart

== Production ==
Principal photography commenced in August 2018. Filming concluded in March 2019.

== Ratings ==
According to AGB Nielsen Philippines' Nationwide Urban Television Audience Measurement People in television homes, the pilot episode of My Special Tatay earned a 6.6% rating.

== Accolades ==
Accolades received by My Special Tatay
Year	Award	Category	Recipient	Result	Ref.
2019	1st Inside Showbiz Awards!	Inside Showbiz Choice Performance of the Year	Ken Chan	Won	
2019	13th UPLB Isko’t Iska Multi-media Awards	Most Development-Oriented Drama Program	My Special Tatay	Won	
2019	17th Gawad Tanglaw	Best Lead Performance in a TV Series	Ken Chan Rita Daniela	Won	
2019	50th Box Office Entertainment Awards	TV Actor of the Year (Daytime Drama)	Ken Chan	Won	
2019	50th Box Office Entertainment Awards	Most Popular Program (Daytime Drama)	My Special Tatay	Won	
2019	7th Kagitingan Awards	TV Personality	Ken Chan	Won	
2019	7th Kagitingan Awards	TV Drama	My Special Tatay	Won	
2019	33rd PMPC Star Awards for Television	Power Tandem of the Year	Ken Chan Rita Daniela	Won	
2019	33rd PMPC Star Awards for Television	Best Daytime Drama Series	My Special Tatay	Nominated	
2019	VP Choice Awards	TV Actor of the Year	Ken Chan	Won	
