= Lolo and the Kid =

2024 coming-of-age drama film

- Promotional release poster
- Directed by: Benedict Mique
- Written by: Benedict Mique
- Produced by: Benedict Mique
- Starring: Euwenn Mikaell; Joel Torre
- Cinematography: Mark Joseph Cosico
- Edited by: Noah Tonga
- Music by: Isha Abubakar
- Production company: Lonewolf Films
- Distributed by: Netflix
- Release date: August 7, 2024
- Running time: 97 minutes
- Country: Philippines
- Language: Filipino

Lolo and the Kid (lit. Grandpa and the Kid) is a 2024 Philippine drama film written, produced, and directed by Benedict Mique. Starring Euwenn Mikaell and Joel Torre, with the special participation of Juan Karlos, the hard-hitting emotional drama film revolves around the relationship between an adult hustler and a child.

Lolo and the Kid premiered on Netflix on August 7, 2024. On August 11, 2024, the film reached number 1 spot in Netflix's top 10 movies in the Philippines.

== Plot ==
An experienced elderly hustler (Lolo "Mario") and his energetic & mischievous adoptive son (Kid) survive on the streets by routinely conning the wealthy families. They do so by pretending to be homeless so the owners will take the child in under their adopted care. One of their victims is a middle-class couple Allan and Gemma, who under the cover of night, Kid steals their retail goods and sneaks out of their residence before they then sell the stolen goods at the black market to a client named "Taba" for a discounted price.

As the Kid leaves to buy ice cream, Lolo scouts for the next target, eventually picking a house owned by Sandra, a wealthy businesswoman whose parents died of a drug overdose. The two manage to steal her belongings but not before being spotted by Sandra herself from a window above; however, she decides against calling the cops and continues to watch them leave.

Lolo sells one of Sandra's stolen belongings and is able to pick a third house belonging to wealthy gay partners John and Norman. They lent Lolo a large amount of money they could offer to care for his son, before Kid steals their belongings. However, they were caught by John & Norman and Kid was struck by an oncoming vehicle. The couple had the doctors treat the Kid, but he reunites with Lolo after he escapes from the hospital through the back door.

The two travel to the beach where they spent their entire day together. Lolo recalls the time when he was completely destitute and on a verge of suicide when he comes across an abandoned infant and decides to raise him as his own. The duo then picks a fourth house belonging to a wealthy couple Irma and Joel, who lost their son to cancer and are willing to raise Kid as their son. Concerned for the Kid's safety and determined to have him live a better life away from the streets, he tells Kid to live with their adopted parents, much to their dismay as he saw this as backtracking their promise to remain partners.

Years later, Kid has now grown into adulthood, and Joel and Irma are planning for a celebratory dinner when the Kid visits an elderly Lolo in the hospital. After selling the camera they had earlier bought from Taba, Lolo decides to take Kid to the karaoke bar to sing "Through the Years" for old times. When they reach the chorus, Lolo passes away on the wheelchair.

As Lolo is taken away, the Kid scrounges his belongings and finds a photo collection of himself growing up and graduating in college, revealing that Lolo continued to care for him as he wept in tears.

== Cast ==
- Euwenn Mikaell as Kid
  - Juan Karlos Labajo as Adult Kid
- Joel Torre as Lolo / Mario
- Iza Calzado as Sandra, Kid's second adoptive parent
- Meryll Soriano as Gemma, Allan's wife & Kid's first adoptive mother
- Joem Bascon as Allan, Gemma's husband & Kid's first adoptive father
- Nico Antonio as John, Norman's partner & Kid's third adoptive parent
- Markki Stroem as Norman, John's partner & Kid's third adoptive parent
- Shaina Magdayao as Irma, Joel's wife & Kid's present adoptive mother
- Alfred Vargas as Joel, Irma's husband & Kid's present adoptive father
- David Shouder as Taba
- Leila Ang as Larra

== Reception ==
On the review aggregator website Rotten Tomatoes, 100% of 5 critics' reviews are positive, with an average rating of 7.30/10. The movie received a score of 61/100 from 10 reviews according to review aggregator website Kritikultura, indicating generally positive reviews.

Archi Sengupta of LeisureByte.com gave the film a rating of 3 over 5 and wrote; Lolo and the Kid feels a tad bit rushed sometimes but there’s enough emotion and genuineness here for the movie to be memorable. Thanks to fantastic performances, the movie leaves you emotional and you can feel Lolo’s mindset shift about Kid’s future the more time we spend with them. It’s Euwenn Mikael Aleta and Joel Torre’s film through and through and that’s evident in every frame.

Daniel Hart of Ready Steady Cut gave the film a positive review and rated it 4 out of 5 and he wrote; The Filipino film pitches a premise that’s difficult to process emotionally because you are unsure what to feel.

John Serba of Decider satisfied at the film and gave it a positive feedback and he wrote; Lolo and the Kid has its issues, but its depiction of a grandfather/grandson dynamic is nice enough to warrant a very mild recommendation.

Jason Flatt of But Why Tho? A Geek Community gave the film a rating of 8 over 10 and wrote; Lolo and the Kid is sweet and simple... most definitely give this one a watch when you’re looking for something bittersweet to enjoy.

Accolades received by Lolo and the Kid
| Year | Award | Category | Recipient(s) | Result | Ref. |
|---|---|---|---|---|---|
| 2025 | 8th EDDYS Awards | Best Actor | Joel Torre | Pending | |

== Soundtrack ==
Through the Years (Lolo and the Kid OST)

Soundtrack album by Juan Karlos
- Released: August 29, 2024
- Recorded: 2024
- Length: 3:58
- Label: Island Records Philippines

track listing
| No. | Title | Artist | Length |
|---|---|---|---|
| 1. | "Through the Years" | Juan Karlos | 3:58 |

- Composed and written by Steve Dorff and Marty Panzer. Originally sung by Kenny Rogers and covered by Juan Karlos. Published and administered by Island Records Philippines.
