= Forever Young (Philippine TV series) =

Philippine television drama series

- Title card
- Genre: Political drama; Comedy
- Created by: Loi Argel Nova
- Written by: Tina Samson; John Roque
- Directed by: Gil Tejada Jr.
- Creative director: Aloy Adlawan
- Starring: Euwenn Mikaell
- Country of origin: Philippines
- Original language: Tagalog
- No. of episodes: 90

Production
- Executive producer: Mavic Tagbo
- Camera setup: Multiple-camera setup
- Running time: 21–30 minutes
- Production company: GMA Entertainment Group

Original release
- Network: GMA Network
- Release: October 21, 2024 – February 21, 2025

Forever Young is a Philippine television drama comedy series broadcast by GMA Network. Directed by Gil Tejada Jr., it stars Euwenn Mikaell in the title role. It premiered on October 21, 2024 on the network's Afternoon Prime line up. The series concluded on February 21, 2025, with a total of 90 episodes.

The series is streaming online on YouTube.

== Premise ==
Rambo is a 25 year old man who has panhypopituitarism, which slows down his growth and keeps his childlike appearance. His purpose is to help people and aspires to become a public servant.

== Cast and characters ==
Cast

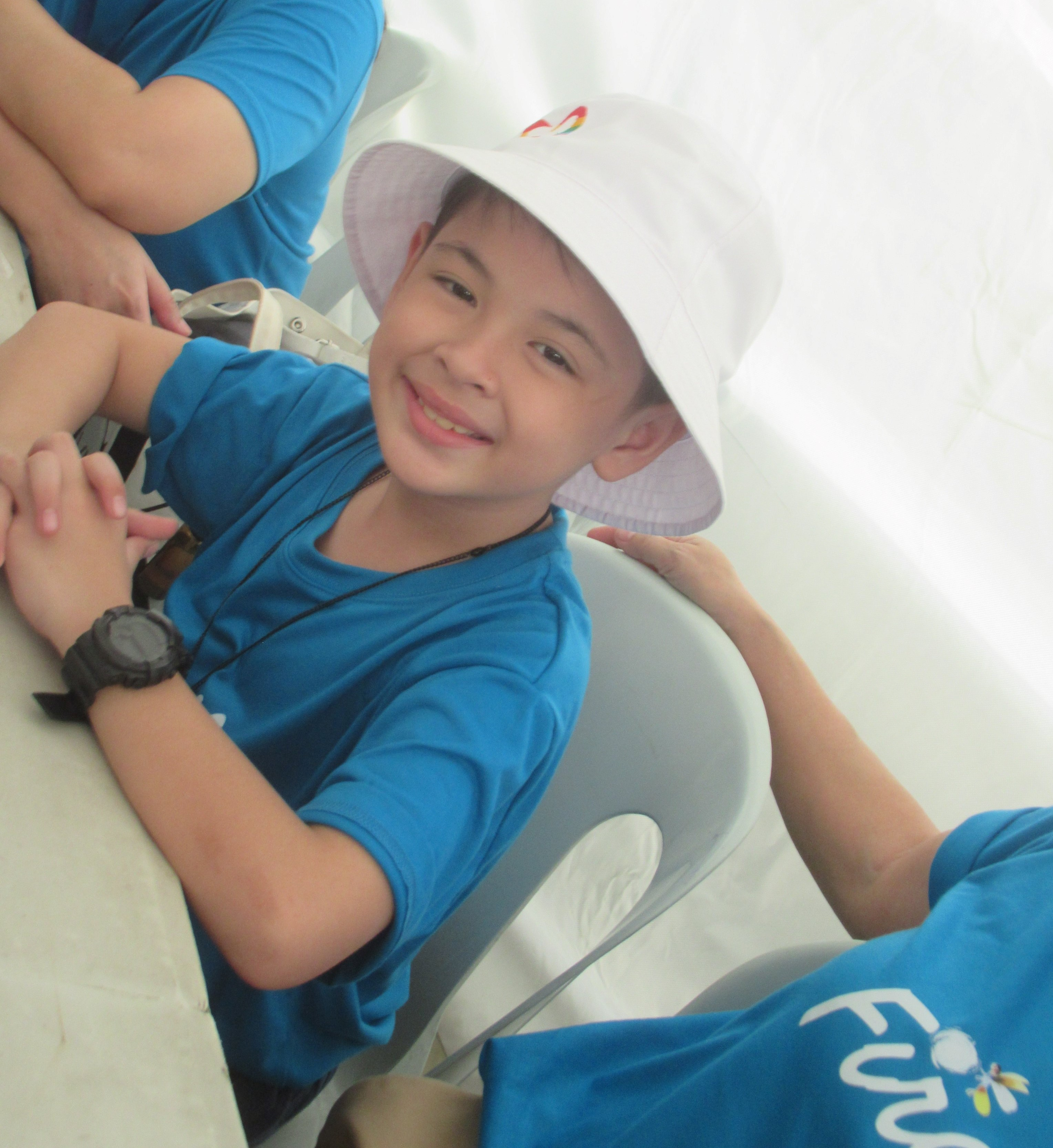
Euwenn Mikaell

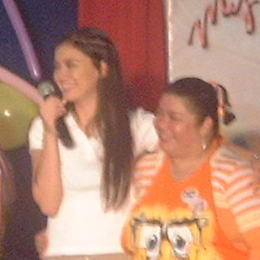
Nadine Samonte (left)

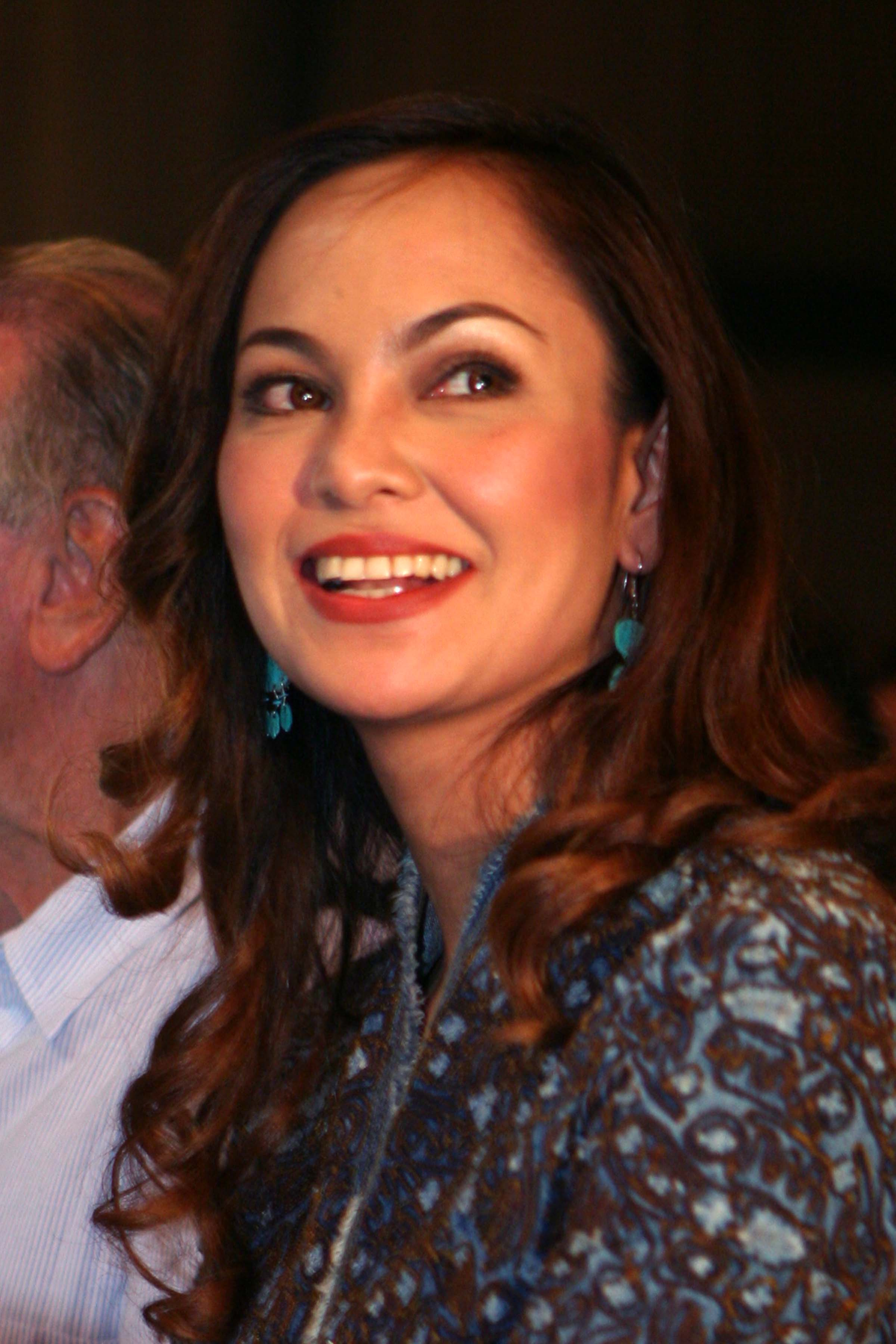
Eula Valdez

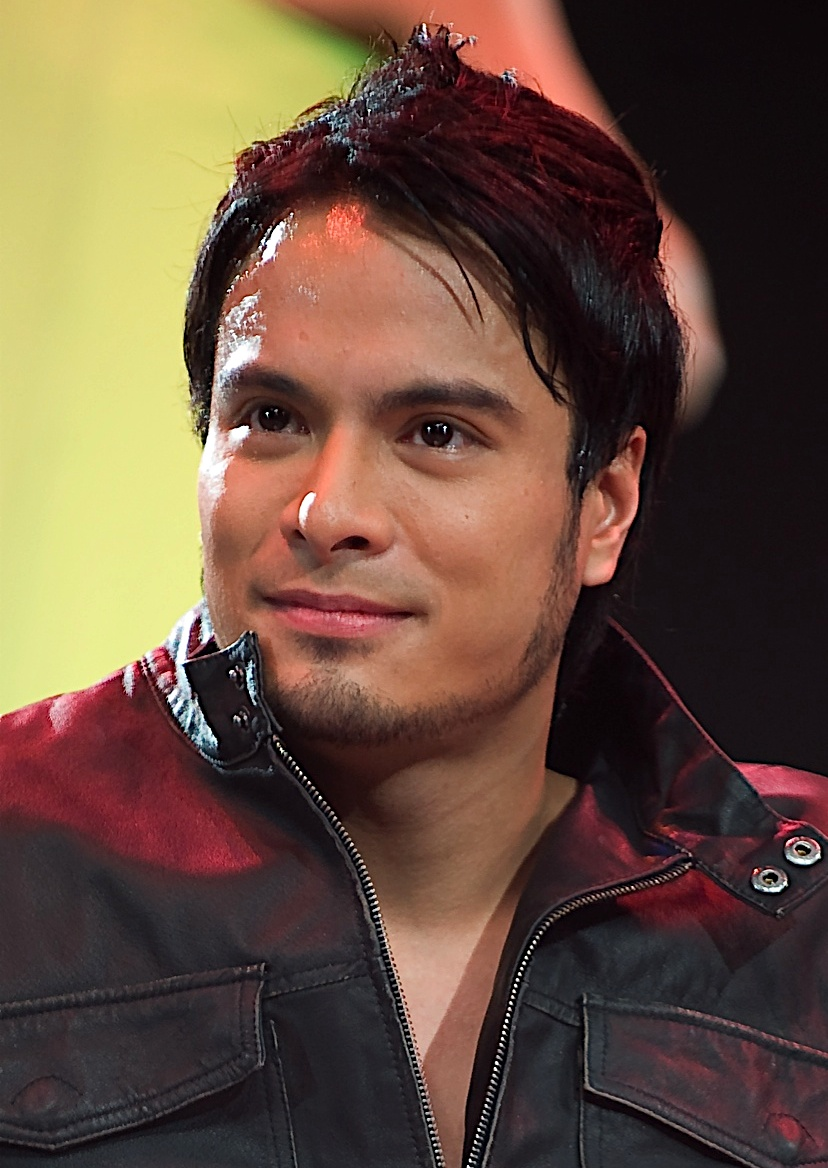
Rafael Rosell

Lead cast

- Euwenn Mikaell as Rambo Agapito / Eduardo Malaque Jr.

Supporting cast

- Nadine Samonte as Juday Agapito
- Michael de Mesa as Eduardo Malaque Sr.
- Eula Valdez as Esmeralda Vergara
- Rafael Rosell as Albert Vergara
- Alfred Vargas as Gregory Agapito
- Althea Ablan as Raine Agapito
- Princess Aliyah as Rylie Agapito
- Bryce Eusebio as Cliff Peralta
- James Blanco as Rigor Peralta
- Matt Lozano as Ompong
- Abdul Raman as Joryl Vergara

Guest cast

- Lucho Ayala as Julio
- Dang Cruz as Tammy
- Patricia Tumulak
- Maritess Samson as Aileen
- Sophie Albert as Marian Malaque
- Sharmaine Suarez as Eduardo's wife
- Elijah Alejo as Eduardo's daughter
- Liana Mae as Eduardo's daughter
- Olive May as Jenny
- Chanda Romero as Guada
- Yasser Marta as Oliver

== Production ==
Principal photography commenced on February 16, 2024.

== Ratings ==
According to AGB Nielsen Philippines' Nationwide Urban Television Audience Measurement People in Television Homes, the pilot episode of Forever Young earned a 7.1% rating.
