= The Write One =

2023 Philippine television drama series

- Title card
- Genre: Romantic drama; Fantasy
- Created by: Mark Anthony Norella
- Directed by: King Mark Baco
- Starring: Ruru Madrid; Bianca Umali
- Theme music composer: Marvin Jason Hernandez
- Opening theme: "Oras" by Jason Marvin
- Country of origin: Philippines
- Original language: Tagalog
- No. of episodes: 39

Production
- Executive producer: Maria Ana Isabel M. Rodrigo
- Camera setup: Multiple-camera setup
- Running time: 27–30 minutes
- Production company: GMA Public Affairs

Original release
- Network: GMA Network
- Release: March 20 – May 25, 2023

The Write One is a 2023 Philippine television drama romance fantasy series broadcast by GMA Network. Directed by King Mark Baco, it stars Ruru Madrid and Bianca Umali. It premiered on March 20, 2023, on the network's Telebabad line up. The series concluded on May 25, 2023, with a total of 39 episodes.

The series is streaming online on YouTube.

== Cast and characters ==
Cast

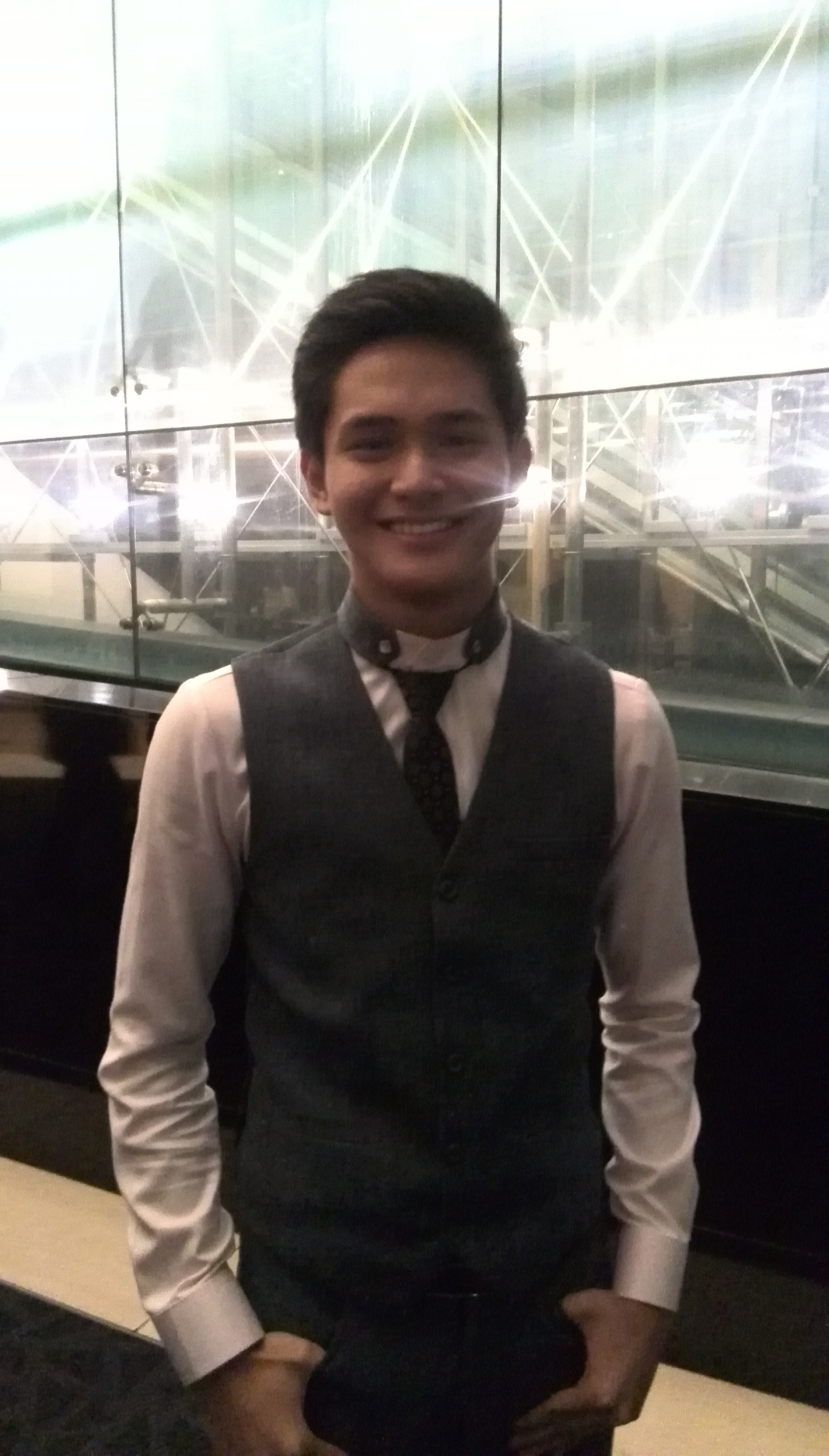
Ruru Madrid

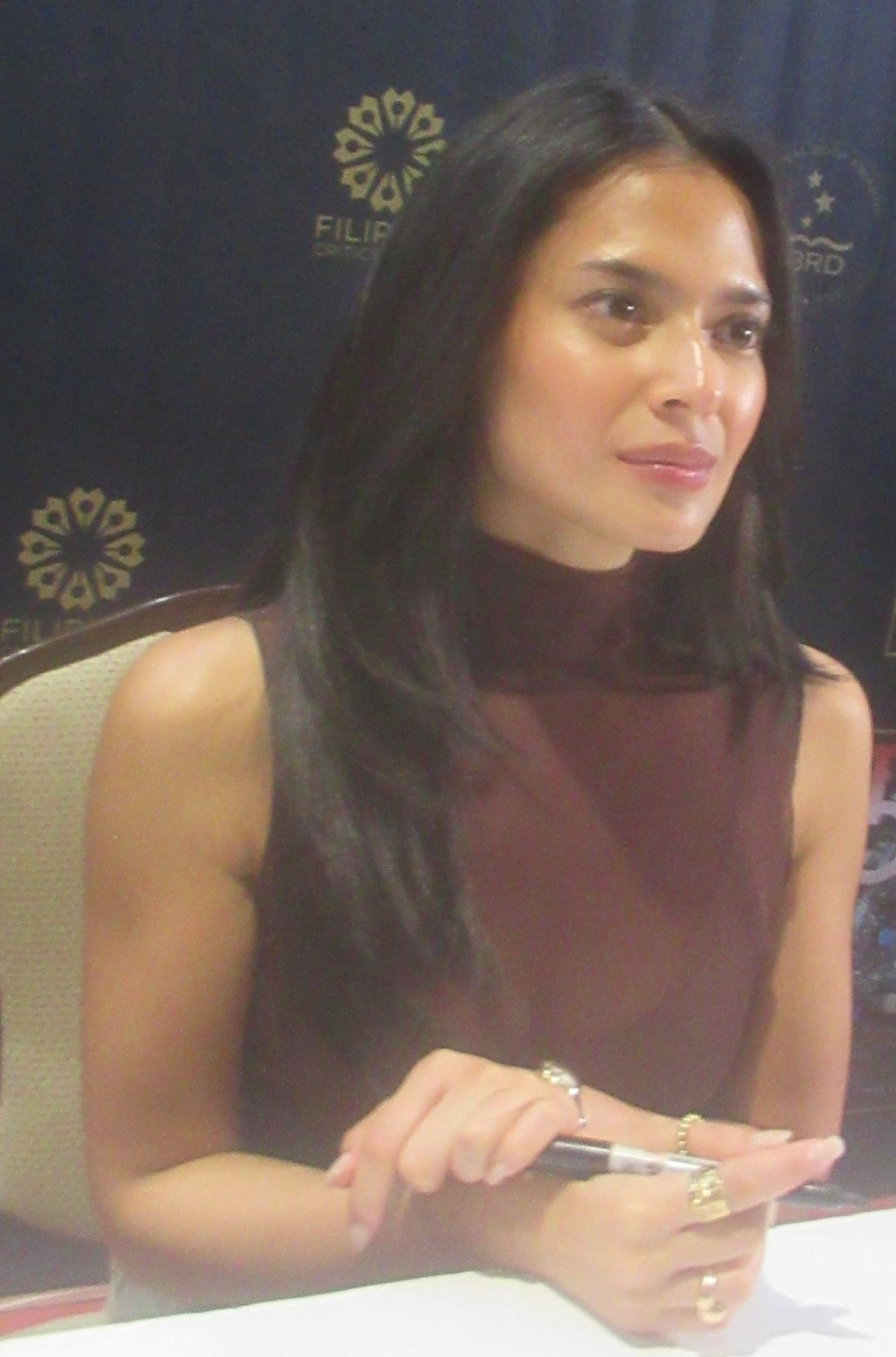
Bianca Umali

Lead cast

- Ruru Madrid as William "Liam" B. Herrera
- Bianca Umali as Joycelyn "Joyce" Trinidad-Herrera / Savana Trinidad

Supporting cast

- Mikee Quintos as Victoria "Via" dela Peña
- Paul Salas as Hans Arevalo
- Lotlot de Leon as Teresita "Tess" Buenaventura-Herrera
- Ramon Christopher as Danilo Herrera
- Mon Confiado as Ramon dela Peña
- Art Acuña as Edmond Trinidad
- Alma Concepcion as Joanne Trinidad
- Kokoy de Santos as Intoy
- Andrew Schimmer as Lando Nakpil
- Royce Cabrera as Vergil Herrera
- Kaloy Tingcungco as Borj
- Euwenn Mikaell as Dexter "Dex" T. Herrera / Stefano "Sep" Lualhati
- Analyn Barro as Megan
- Yvette Sanchez as Deedee
- Migs Villasis as Leroy
- Karenina Haniel as Odette
- Eva Le Queen as Queenie

Guest cast

- Kian Co as younger William Herrera
- Francis Mata as Nestor
- Rere Madrid as Maxine
- Shanelle Agustin as Chanel
- Gardo Versoza as the president
- Thea Tolentino as Isabel
- Gil Cuerva as Diego
- Anjay Anson as Tristan
- Buboy Villar as Grasa
- Mikoy Morales as the grandson
- Phil Noble as a director
- Marnie Lapus as Malvarosa

== Production ==
Principal photography commenced on February 1, 2023.

== Ratings ==
According to AGB Nielsen Philippines' Nationwide Urban Television Audience Measurement People in television homes, the pilot episode of The Write One earned a 6.6% rating.

== Accolades ==
Accolades received by The Write One
Year	Award	Category	Recipient	Result	Ref.
2024	52nd Box Office Entertainment Awards	Most Popular Love Team for Television	Ruru Madrid, Bianca Umali	Won	
2025	37th PMPC Star Awards for Television	Best Child Performer	Kian Co	Nominated	
2025	37th PMPC Star Awards for Television	Best Child Performer	Euwenn Mikael	Nominated	
