= Samahan ng mga Makasalanan =

2025 film by Benedict Mique

- Directed by: Benedict Mique Jr.
- Written by: Benedict Mique Jr.; Aya Anunciacion
- Produced by: Benedict Mique Jr.; Nessa S. Valdellon; Annette Gozon-Valdes; Chavit Singson
- Starring: David Licauco; Sanya Lopez; Joel Torre
- Cinematography: Mark Tirona
- Edited by: Noah Tonga
- Music by: Emerzon Texon
- Production companies: GMA Pictures; Lonewolf Films
- Distributed by: GMA Pictures
- Release date: April 19, 2025
- Running time: 104 minutes
- Country: Philippines
- Language: Filipino

Samahan ng mga Makasalanan (transl. Fellowship of the Sinful) (internationally known as The Sinner's Club) is a 2025 Philippine satirical comedy film co-written, co-produced, and directed by Benedict Mique. It stars David Licauco, Sanya Lopez and Joel Torre. It is released on April 19, 2025.

== Synopsis ==
Sam (David Licauco), a young deacon, is assigned to a village full of sinners. He creates a unique organization called the "Samahan ng mga Makasalanan" in an effort to save the town's residents.

== Cast ==
Main role

- David Licauco as Reverend Sam, a Santo Cristo church young deacon.
- Sanya Lopez as Mila
- Joel Torre as Father Danny

Supporting role

- Soliman Cruz as Boss Luis
- Buboy Villar as Boy Nakaw/Padala
- Betong Sumaya as Mayor Damonyo/Tonyong Scammer
- Chariz Solomon as Olive
- Jay Ortega as Junyor
- Euwenn Mikaell as Bryan
- Liezel Lopez as Cindy
- Chanty Videla as Amy
- Jun Sabayton as Kanor
- Jade Tecson as Wendy
- Liana Mae as Girlie
- David Shouder as Pester
- Shernan Gaite as Westcoast Gang
- Christian Singson as Rocky
- Yian Gabriel as Mac Talamac
- Jerome "BatManunulat" Esguerra as Eastcoast Gang
- Christian "Marsy" Kimp Atip as Urot
- David "Abdul" Domanais as Barry
- Noel Colet as Cardinal

== Production ==
The look test and story conference took place in December 2024.

Principal photography started in Vigan in January and concluded in March 2025.

Benedict Mique, Atty. Annette Gozon-Valdez, Vanessa Valdellon, former Ilocos Sur governor Chavit Singson and the cast attended a media conference on March 27, 2025, in Seda.

== Release ==
The film was released on April 19, 2025 under GMA Pictures.

== Reception ==
In contrast to his typical "pa-cute" parts, David Licauco is giving a very strong performance, according to Mark Angelo Ching of PEP.ph. Even though the movie had some hiccups, it ends up being a heartwarming tale.
