= Hanggang sa Dulo ng Buhay Ko =

2019 Philippine television drama series

- Title card
- Also known as: Obsession
- Genre: Horror drama
- Created by: Borj Danao
- Written by: Denoy Navarro-Punio; John Kenneth de Leon; Borj Danao; Brylle Tabora
- Directed by: Jorron Lee Monroy
- Creative director: Aloy Adlawan
- Starring: Kris Bernal; Rayver Cruz; Kim Domingo; Megan Young
- Theme music composer: Natasha L. Correos
- Opening theme: "Bulong" by Julie Anne San Jose
- Country of origin: Philippines
- Original language: Tagalog
- No. of episodes: 78 (list of episodes)

Production
- Executive producer: Joseph T. Aleta
- Cinematography: Emilio L. Abello; Alex Espartero
- Editors: Benedict Lavastida; Noel Mauricio II
- Camera setup: Multiple-camera setup
- Running time: 22–31 minutes
- Production company: GMA Entertainment Group

Original release
- Network: GMA Network
- Release: July 22 – October 19, 2019

Hanggang sa Dulo ng Buhay Ko (transl. until the end of my life / international title: Obsession) is a 2019 Philippine television drama horror series broadcast by GMA Network. Directed by Jorron Lee Monroy, it stars Kris Bernal, Rayver Cruz, Kim Domingo and Megan Young. It premiered on July 22, 2019 on the network's Afternoon Prime and Sabado Star Power sa Hapon line up. The series concluded on October 19, 2019, with a total of 78 episodes.

Originally titled as The Haunted Wife, it was later renamed to Hanggang sa Dulo ng Buhay Ko. The series is streaming online on YouTube.

== Premise ==
Yvie Cardeñas and Matteo Divinagracia are childhood sweethearts who fall in love and eventually get married. They happily moved into their new family home, along with their adopted son and Yvie's cousin, Katya Calderon. Matteo's former girlfriend, Naomi Espiritu will put fear into their lives and disrupt their lives.

== Cast and characters ==
Cast

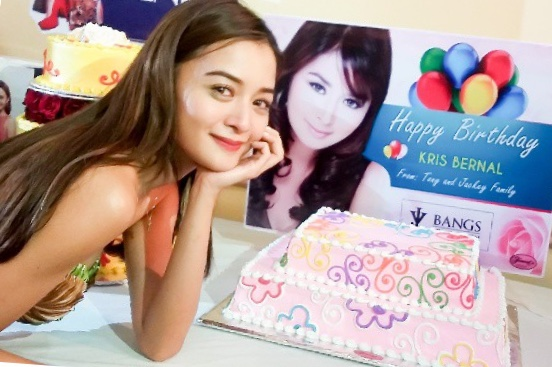
Kris Bernal

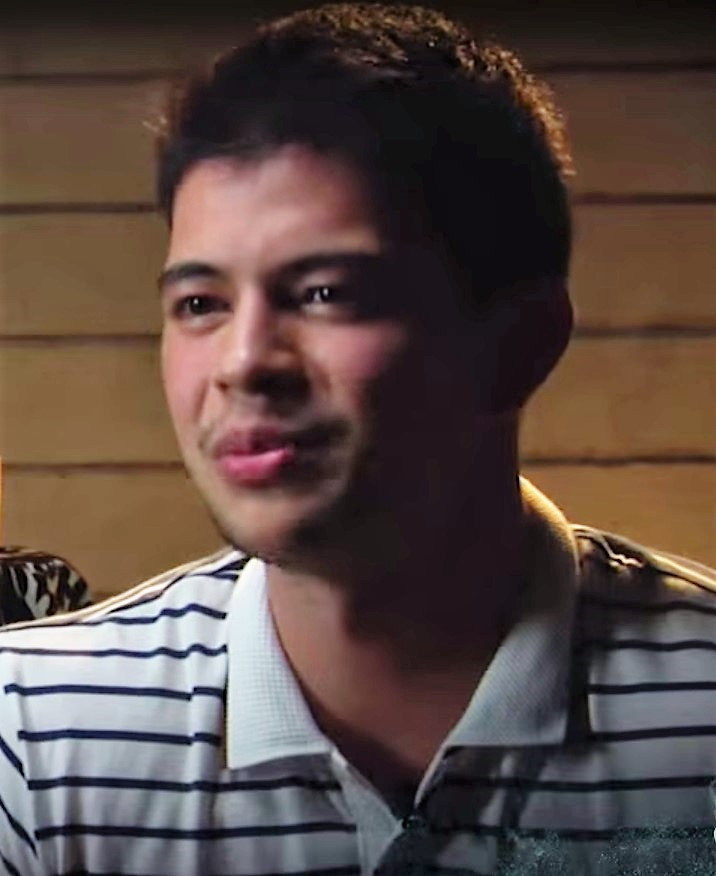
Rayver Cruz

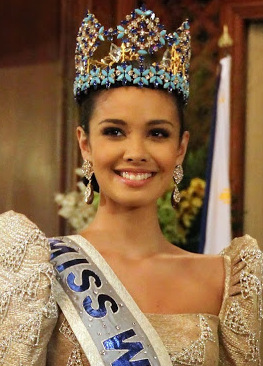
Megan Young

Lead cast

- Kris Bernal as Naomi Espiritu
- Rayver Cruz as Matteo Divinagracia
- Kim Domingo as Katherine "Katya" De Jesus Calderon / Naomi Espiritu
- Megan Young as Yvette "Yvie" Cardeñas-Divinagracia

Supporting cast

- Boots Anson-Roa as Adora "Abuela" Divinagracia
- Sharmaine Arnaiz as Valentina "Tina" De Jesus-Cardeñas
- Francine Prieto as Mercedes "Mercy" De Jesus-Calderon
- Beverly Salviejo as Vanessa "Vane" Espiritu
- Euwenn Aleta as Santino "Santy" Cardeñas Divinagracia / Matteo Espiritu Divinagracia Jr.
- Denise Barbacena as Brooke
- Analyn Barro as Tyra Espiritu
- Joaquin Manansala as Paul
- Rob Moya as Bob

Guest cast

- Gileth Sandico as Mariana
- Patricia Javier as Loida
- Rodjun Cruz as Ben Dela Cruz
- Patani Daño as Trinity
- Kevin Sagra as Carlson
- Hannah Precillas as Nina
- Boboy Garovillo as Daryl
- Rodolfo Muyuela as Kulas
- Patricia Tumulak as Michelle
- Rey PJ Abellana as Ross
- Cherry Malvar as Pearl
- Marlon Mance as Darius
- Bryan Benedict as Bustamante
- Visam Arenas as Gino
- Andrew Ferrer as Kicks

== Ratings ==
According to AGB Nielsen Philippines' Nationwide Urban Television Audience Measurement People in television homes, the pilot episode of Hanggang sa Dulo ng Buhay Ko earned a 5% rating.

== Accolades ==
Accolades received by Hanggang sa Dulo ng Buhay Ko
Year	Award	Category	Recipient	Result	Ref.
2019	VP Choice Awards	TV Actress of the Year	Kris Bernal	Nominated	
2021	34th PMPC Star Awards for Television	Best Child Performer	Euwenn Aleta	Nominated	
2021	34th PMPC Star Awards for Television	Best Daytime Drama Series	Hanggang sa Dulo ng Buhay Ko	Nominated	
