= P77 (film) =

2025 Philippine horror psychological thriller film

- Theatrical release poster
- Directed by: Derick Cabrido
- Written by: Joaquin Enrico Santos
- Produced by: Nessa Valdellon; Angeli Atienza; Kristian Julao
- Starring: Barbie Forteza; Euwenn Mikaell; JC Alcantara; Rosanna Roces
- Cinematography: Mycko David
- Edited by: Noah Tonga
- Music by: Richard Gonzales
- Production companies: GMA Pictures; GMA Public Affairs; Clever Minds Inc.
- Distributed by: Warner Bros. Pictures
- Release date: July 30, 2025
- Running time: 103 minutes
- Country: Philippines
- Language: Filipino

P77, also known as Penthouse 77, is a 2025 Philippine psychological horror film directed by Derick Cabrido. Starring Barbie Forteza, the film was theatrically released on July 30, 2025, as the second GMA Pictures film to be distributed by a Hollywood studio (this time by Warner Bros. Pictures, as its 7th Filipino film overall).

== Synopsis ==
After the death of her younger brother, Luna suffers from nervous breakdown while working as a cabin crew in a cruise ship. She tries to commit suicide by throwing herself into the sea. She is restrained and medicated with anti-depressant. Overwhelmed by grief, Luna's subconsciously creates a distorted version of reality, a dark and supernatural world where Jonas, her younger brother is alive.

== Cast ==
- Barbie Forteza as Luna Caceres
- Euwenn Mikaell as Jonas Caceres
- JC Alcantara as Aji Morales
- Rosanna Roces as Natalia Caceres
- Jackie Lou Blanco as Sonia Cambion
- Carlitos Siguion-Reyna as Andrew Cambion
- Gina Pareño as Lola Martha
- Chrome Cosio as Focalor
- Geraldine Villamil as Aling Osang
- Audrey Alquiroz as Tere
- Raffy Tejada as Julio
- Jorrybell Agoto as Cory

== Development ==
The concept of P77, (Note: (previously Penthouse 77)) an upcoming thriller film was announced on November 29, 2022—originally intended for a release in 2023 until it was delayed for another two years.

=== Casting ===
In October 2024, GMA News confirmed that Sparkle artist Barbie Forteza will be starring on the film. Several actors were announced to appear in the upcoming film including Euwenn Mikaell, Gina Pareño and Rosanna Roces.

== Production ==
Principal photography commenced on October 13, 2024.

== Release ==
P77 released in Philippine cinemas on July 30, 2025. It was released on Amazon Prime Video on January 8, 2026.
