= Maastricht University =

Public university in Maastricht, Netherlands

Coordinates: 50°50′45″N 5°41′14″E

- Universiteit Maastricht
- Former name: Rijksuniversiteit Limburg
- Motto in English: The European university of the Netherlands
- Type: Public
- Established: 9 January 1976
- Affiliations: EUA, VSNU, AMBA, EQUIS, AACSB, WUN, YERUN
- Endowment: €521 million annual income
- President: Rianne Letschert
- Rector: Pamela Habibović
- Faculty: 2,539 (2023)
- Administrative staff: 1,964 (2023)
- Students: 22,976 (2023)
- Location: Maastricht, Netherlands
- Colours: Dark blue and white
- Website: maastrichtuniversity.nl

Maastricht University (abbreviated as UM; Dutch: Universiteit Maastricht) is a public research university in Maastricht, Netherlands. Founded in 1976, it is the second youngest of the fourteen Dutch universities.

In 2023, 22,976 students studied at Maastricht University, 59% of whom were students from outside of the Netherlands, with over 4,000 employees. About half of the bachelor's programmes are fully offered in English, while the other half is taught wholly or partly in Dutch. Most of the master's and doctoral programmes are in English. Besides traditional programmes, Maastricht University also has three honours liberal arts colleges: University College Maastricht and the Maastricht Science Programme in the same liberal arts tradition. The satellite University College Venlo opened in 2015.

== History ==
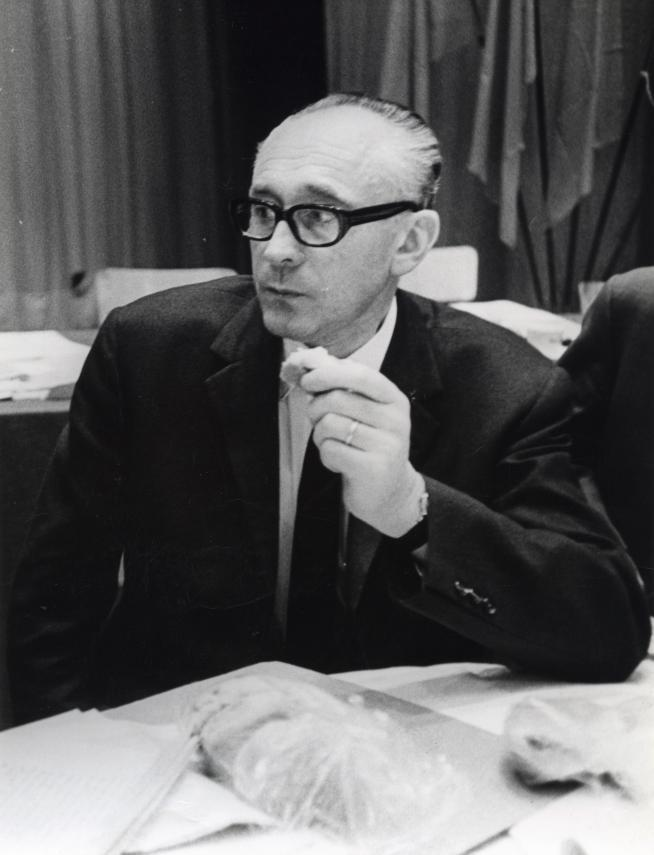
Sjeng Tans, founder of UM

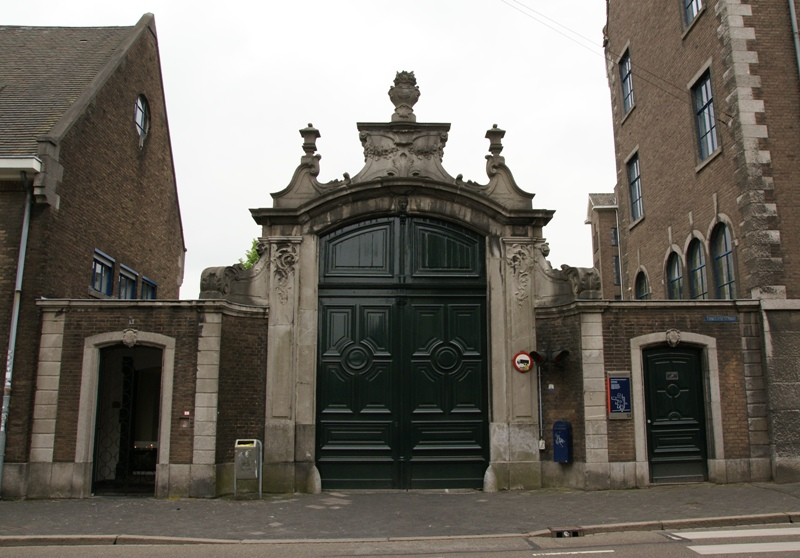
Gate of former Jesuit monastery. Lectures started here in 1974

Maastricht University was officially established in 1976. Faced with a shortage of medical professionals, the Dutch government decided in the late 1960s that a new public institution of higher education was needed in order to expand the country's medical training facilities. Political leaders in the province of Limburg, most notably Sjeng Tans, the chairman of the Labour Party and former member of the Limburg provincial council and Maastricht city council, successfully lobbied for the new medical school to be established in Maastricht. This academic institution would be vital to sustain the intellectual life of the city, and indeed the whole province. Moreover, it was argued that the establishment of a university in Maastricht could contribute to the government's restructuring efforts in this part of the Netherlands, which was experiencing economic challenges following the collapse of the Limburg coal mining industry.

The newly established school chose not to await official recognition but to start its educational programme in September 1974, adopting an innovative approach to academic education in the form of problem-based learning. About 50 students enrolled in the first academic year. By the end of 1975, the Dutch Parliament eventually passed the statute needed for the institution to acquire national educational funds and to be able to award academic degrees. The new university, named Rijksuniversiteit Limburg (State University of Limburg), was officially established on 9 January 1976, when Queen Juliana of the Netherlands signed the university's founding charter at a ceremony in the Basilica of Saint Servatius. Sjeng Tans became the university's first president.

Soon after its establishment, the university gained political support to increase its funding and to expand into other academic fields. The faculty of law was created in 1981, followed by the faculty of economics in 1984. In 1994, the faculty of arts and culture and one year later the faculty of psychology were established. The faculty of humanities and sciences started in 2005, containing a variety of organisational units, such as the department of knowledge engineering and the Maastricht Graduate School of Governance. Together with the faculty of health, medicine and life sciences (established in 2007 as a merger between the faculty of health sciences and the faculty of medicine) Maastricht University currently has six faculties.

The university was renamed Universiteit Maastricht in 1996 and added its English-language name in 2008. As of 2010, Maastricht University consists of six faculties offering 17 bachelor programmes, 56 master programmes and several Ph.D. programmes.

=== 2019 cyber attack ===
On December 23, 2019, Maastricht University suffered a major cyber-attack, more specifically a Microsoft Windows ransomware attack using "Clop". The ransomware encrypted almost all Windows systems used by Maastricht University, making it impossible for students and staff members to access any university online services during the Christmas break. A ransom was set from the offenders, which allowed a decryption of the university systems after Maastricht University paid €200,000 in a Bitcoin transfer. The lessons resumed with no delays on 6 January, with most online services again available to both students and staff members.

In 2020, the public prosecutor service seized the cryptocurrency account in which the ransom was paid. Once the ransom was converted from Bitcoin to Euros, the university was able to recover €500.000, double of what was paid.

== Campuses ==
Maastricht University is located in buildings in two separate locations in Maastricht. The arts, humanities and social science departments are housed in a number of historic buildings in the city center, while psychology, the medical and life sciences are based in the modern Randwyck campus on the outskirts of the city.

=== City centre campuses ===
The university's arts, humanities and social sciences faculties are located in Maastricht's city centre, west of the river Meuse. Most of the university's inner city properties have official monumental status. As many of these buildings were facing abandonment at the time of their acquirement, the development of an urban university campus has contributed to the preservation and liveliness of Maastricht's historic city centre.

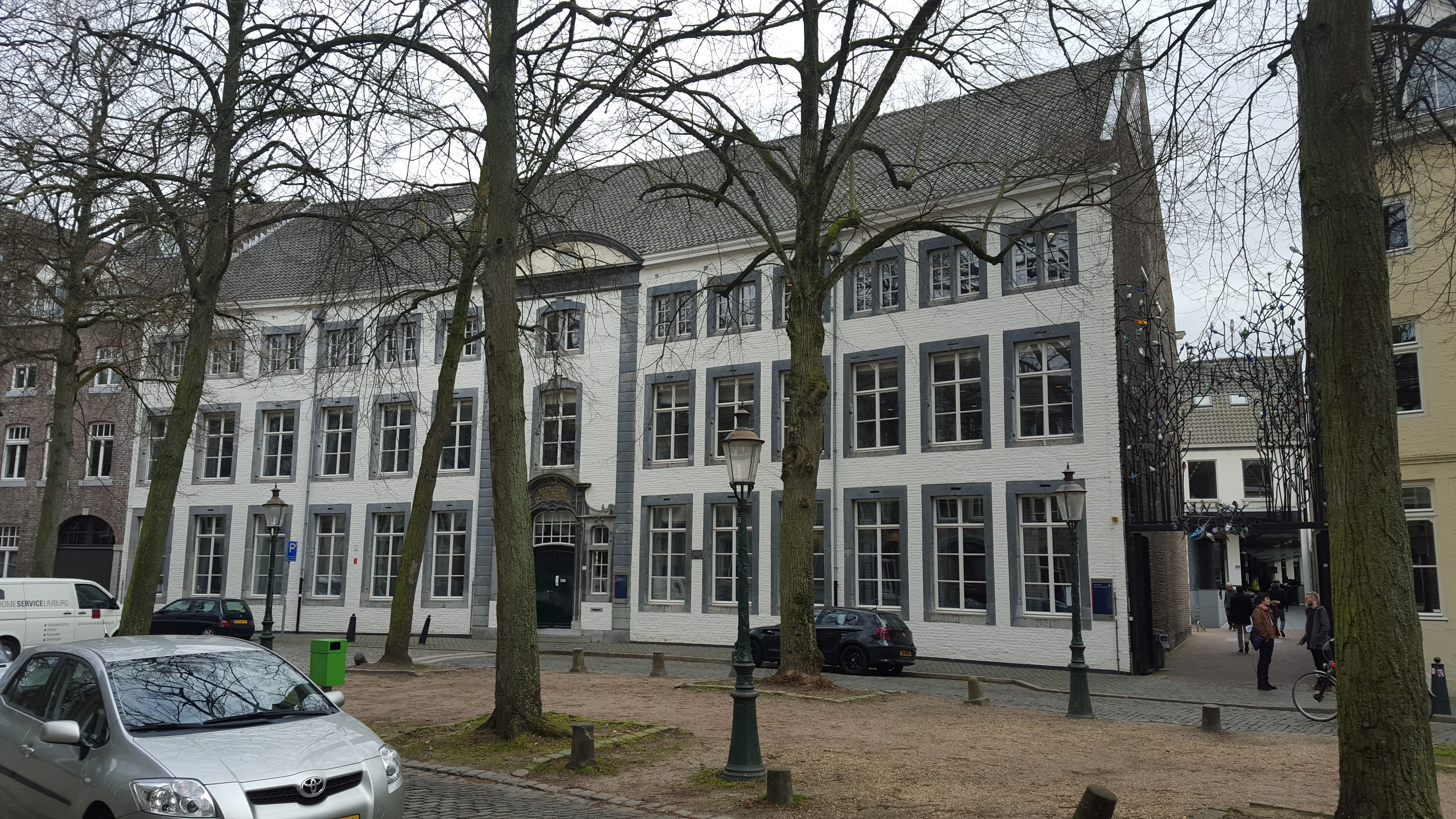
Former poorhouse at Grote Looiersstraat, now part of the university's inner city library

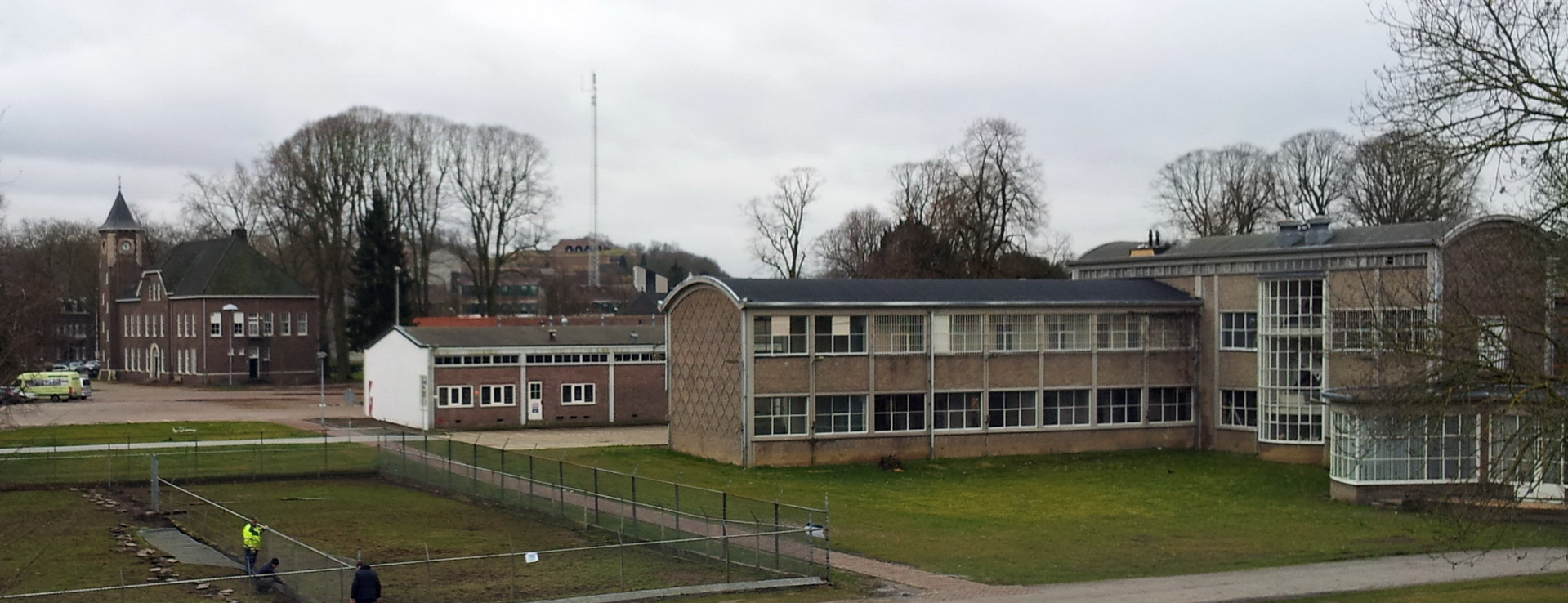
Tapijn Campus, general view, 2015

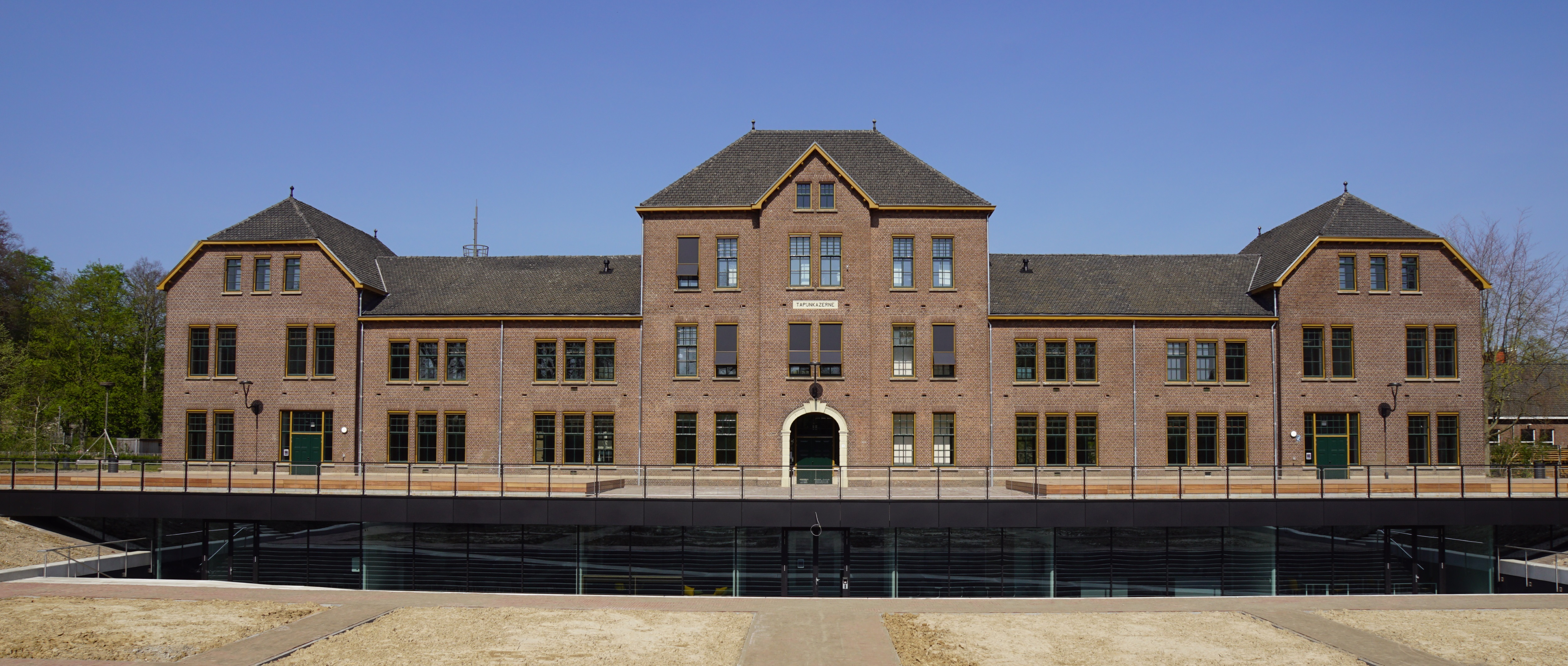
Tapijn Campus, main building, 2020

==== University buildings in Jekerkwartier ====
The first building that was obtained by the university was the former Jesuit monastery and seminary at Tongersestraat, largely dating from the 1930s. Here, in 1974 the newly established medical school started. After the faculty of medicine moved to premises closer to the newly constructed university hospital, the Jesuit monastery became home to the Faculty of Economy, which is now the university's largest academic unit in terms of student numbers. The building was expanded in the 1990s to include the university restaurant (mensa in Dutch) and a large lecture hall designed by Dutch architect Jo Coenen.

The Faculty of Law is housed in the building known as Oud Gouvernement in Bouillonstraat, which was completed in 1935 as the provincial government building. It was acquired by the UM in 1986 after the provincial government had moved to its new premises on the river Meuse in the southeastern part of the city. Opposite lies Slijpe Court, a 17th-century mansion that in 2002 was refurbished to house the Department of Knowledge Engineering of the Faculty of Humanities and Science.

The university's administrative headquarters is located at Minderbroedersberg, in a former Franciscan monastery, which dates back to 1699 and was later used as a court house and prison. The UM acquired the building in order to make it their administrative center in 1999. The Minderbroedersberg, with its Aula (main hall), also serves as the university's primary location for official academic ceremonies, such as Ph.D. conferrals.

At the bottom of the hill lies the former convent of the Bonnefanten, now the university's Student Service Center, as well as a visitor center, including a gift shop. This building, which dates back to 1627, served as a convent for nuns originally from Liège who were referred to as "bons enfants", "good children". In the twentieth century, the city's art museum was established here and later took its name from the building, Bonnefantenmuseum. In 1979 the building became the main branch of the university library, until the library moved to its current location. The oldest part of the library building at Grote Looiersstraat was constructed in 1755 and served as the city's poor house and military hospital. In the 1970s, the city's public library was built in the garden. In 1999 the city library moved to its current location at Centre Ceramique. The old library was then acquired by the UM. After major renovation and expansion works, the university library relocated here in 2003.

University College Maastricht is located at Zwingelput in a 15th-century béguinage, named Nieuwenhof. Maastricht Science College has its new home since 2012 in the renovated Hustinx Mansion in Kapoenstraat, which has a richly ornamented façade and a courtyard that is now covered.

Since 2013, the university has acquired several buildings on the site of the former Tapijn barracks, adjacent to the city park (Stadspark). Although outside the medieval centre, the area is still part of the Jekerkwartier. In 2019 the main U-shaped buildings were refurbished and enlarged with an underground atrium. They now house UM Learning Spaces. Other buildings at the Tapijn Campus are used temporarily by Knowledge Engineering and to help start-up enterprises.

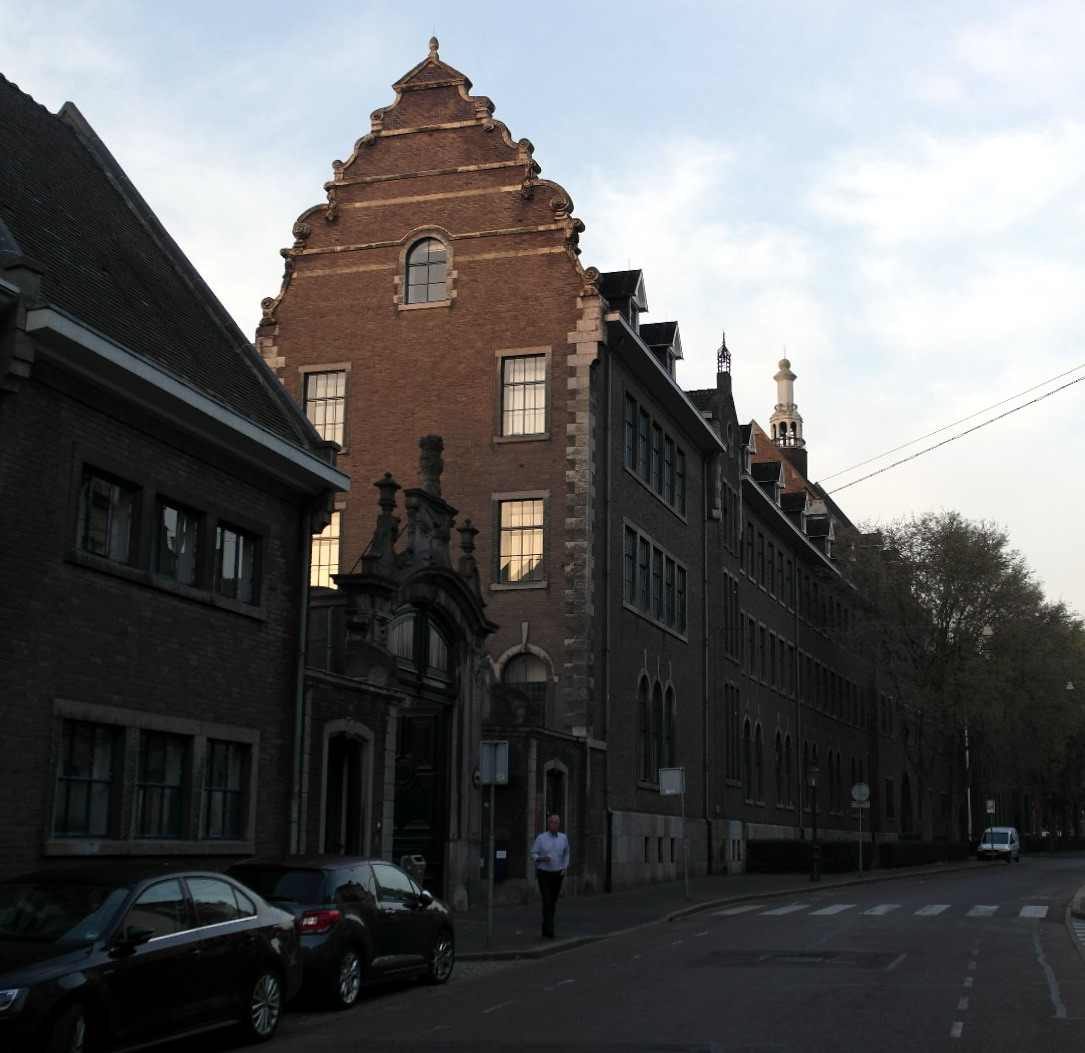
Tongersestraat: former Jesuit Monastery, School of Economics

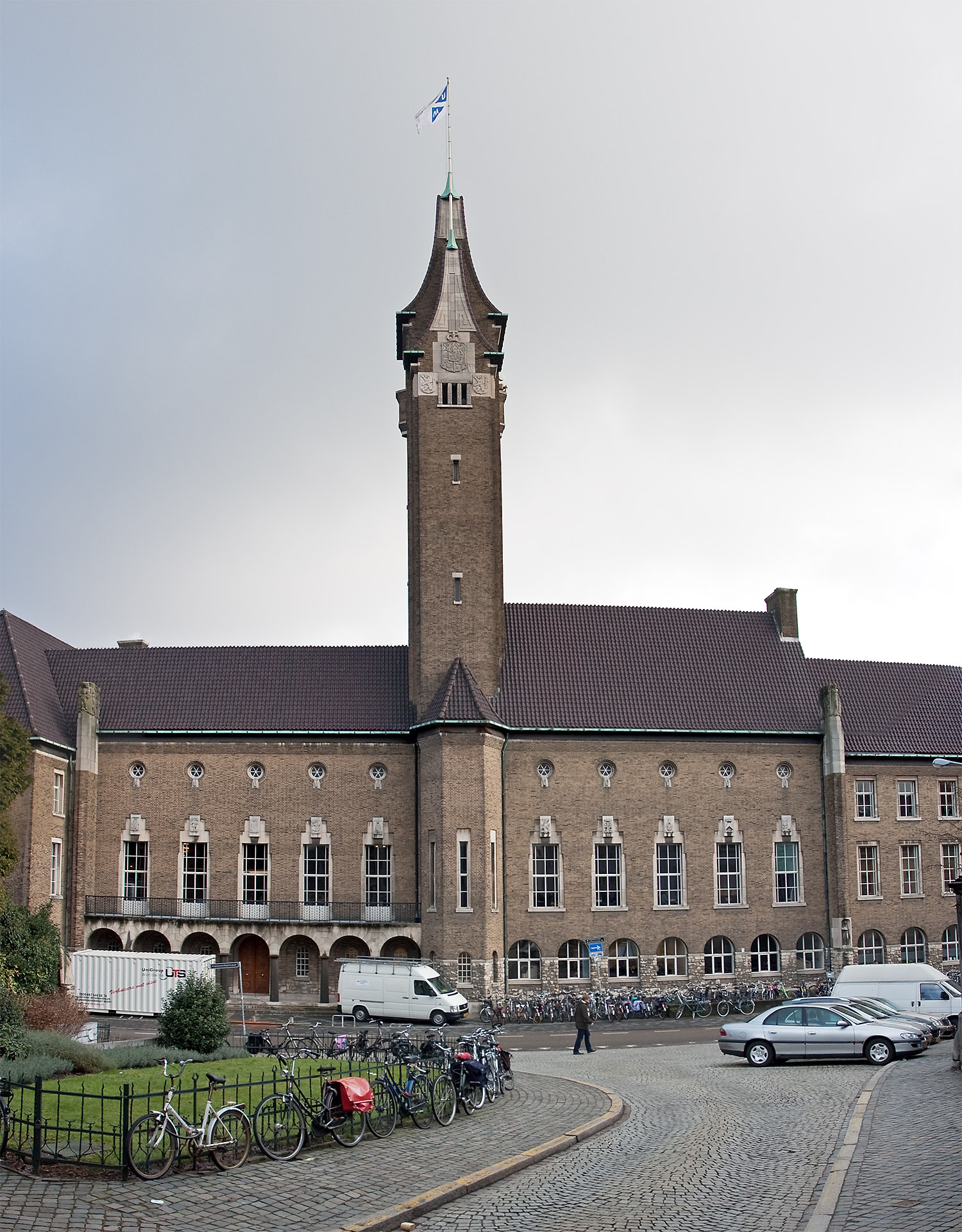
Bouillonstraat: former provincial parliament, Faculty of Law

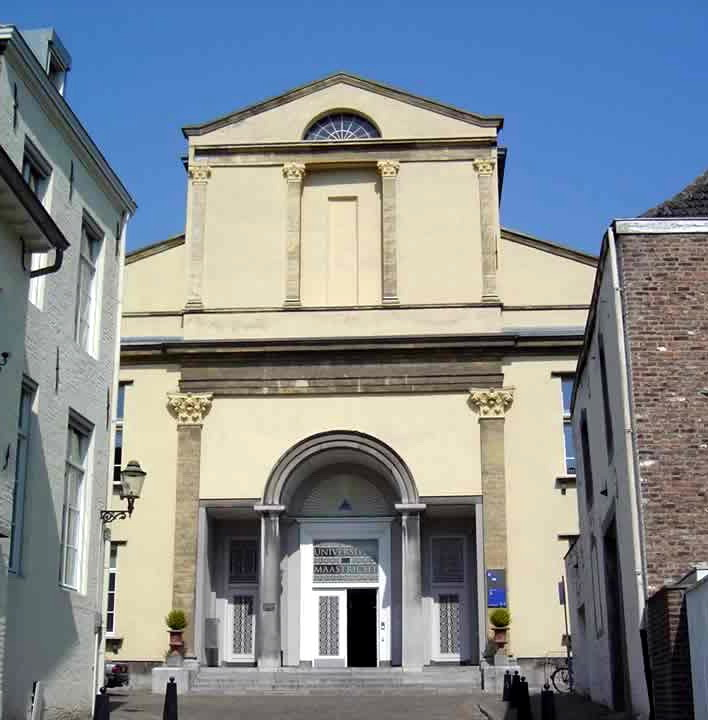
Minderbroedersberg: former Franciscan Church, administrative seat

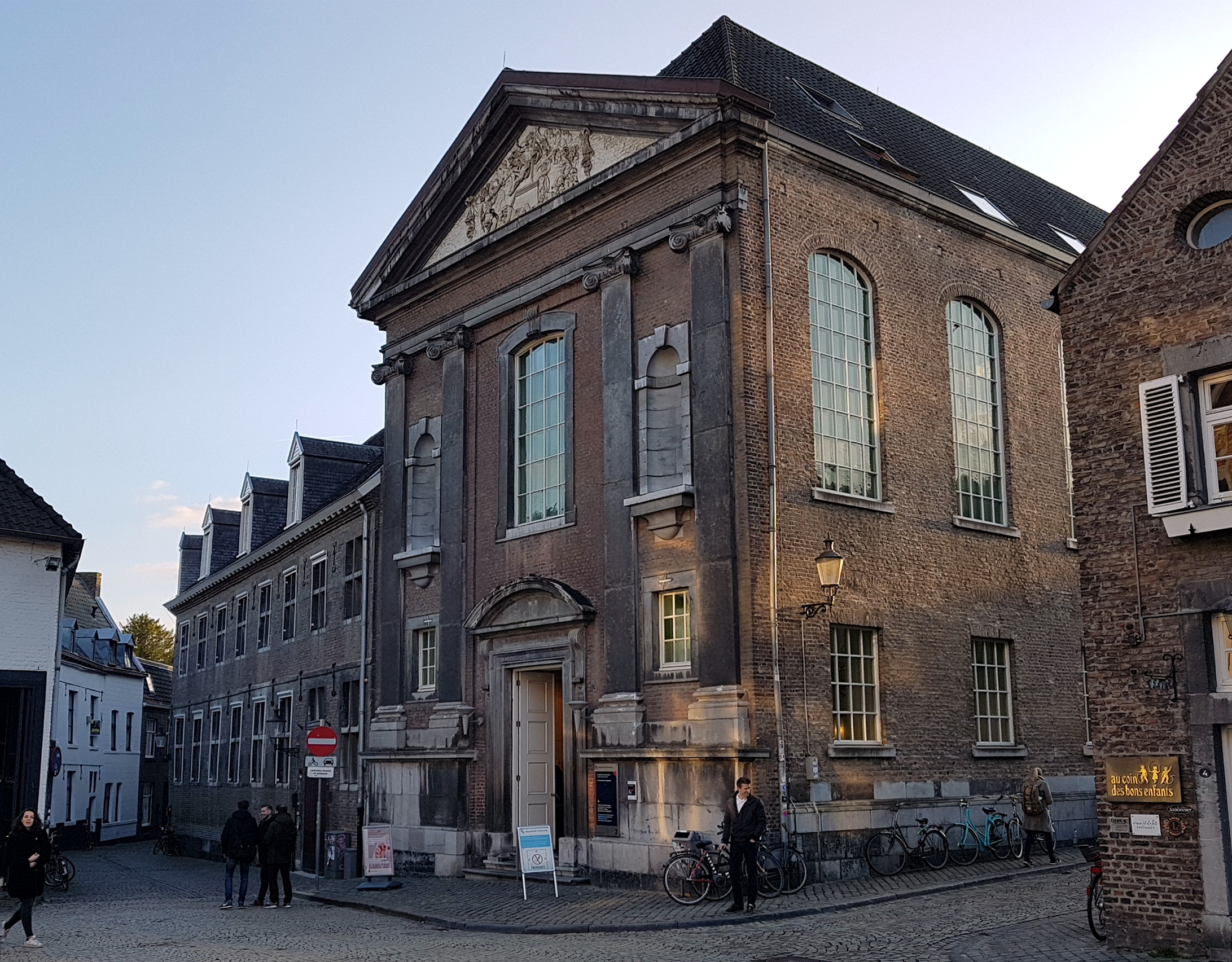
Ezelmarkt: former Bonnefanten Monastery, Student Service Centre

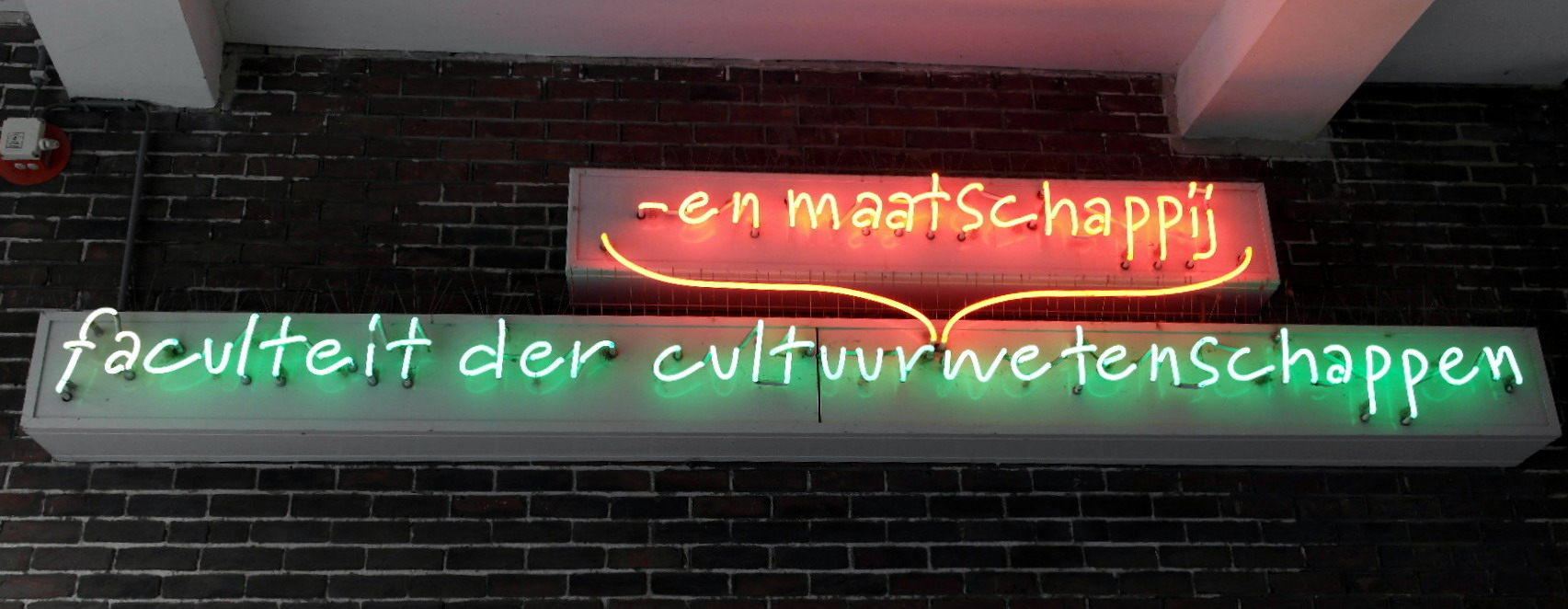
Light sculpture at the entrance of Tilly Mansion, FASoS

==== University buildings elsewhere in the city centre ====
Several other university institutions are housed in buildings elsewhere in the city centre. The UM Language Centre is based in an old canon's house at Sint Servaasklooster. The Faculty of Arts and Social Sciences (FASoS) currently occupies three adjacent buildings on Grote Gracht. Soiron Mansion, built by the architect Matthias Soiron for his two brothers, canons of Saint Servatius Church, the former Ursuline girls schools, and Tilly Court, built for the Count of Tilly, the military governor of Maastricht, both date from the 18th century.

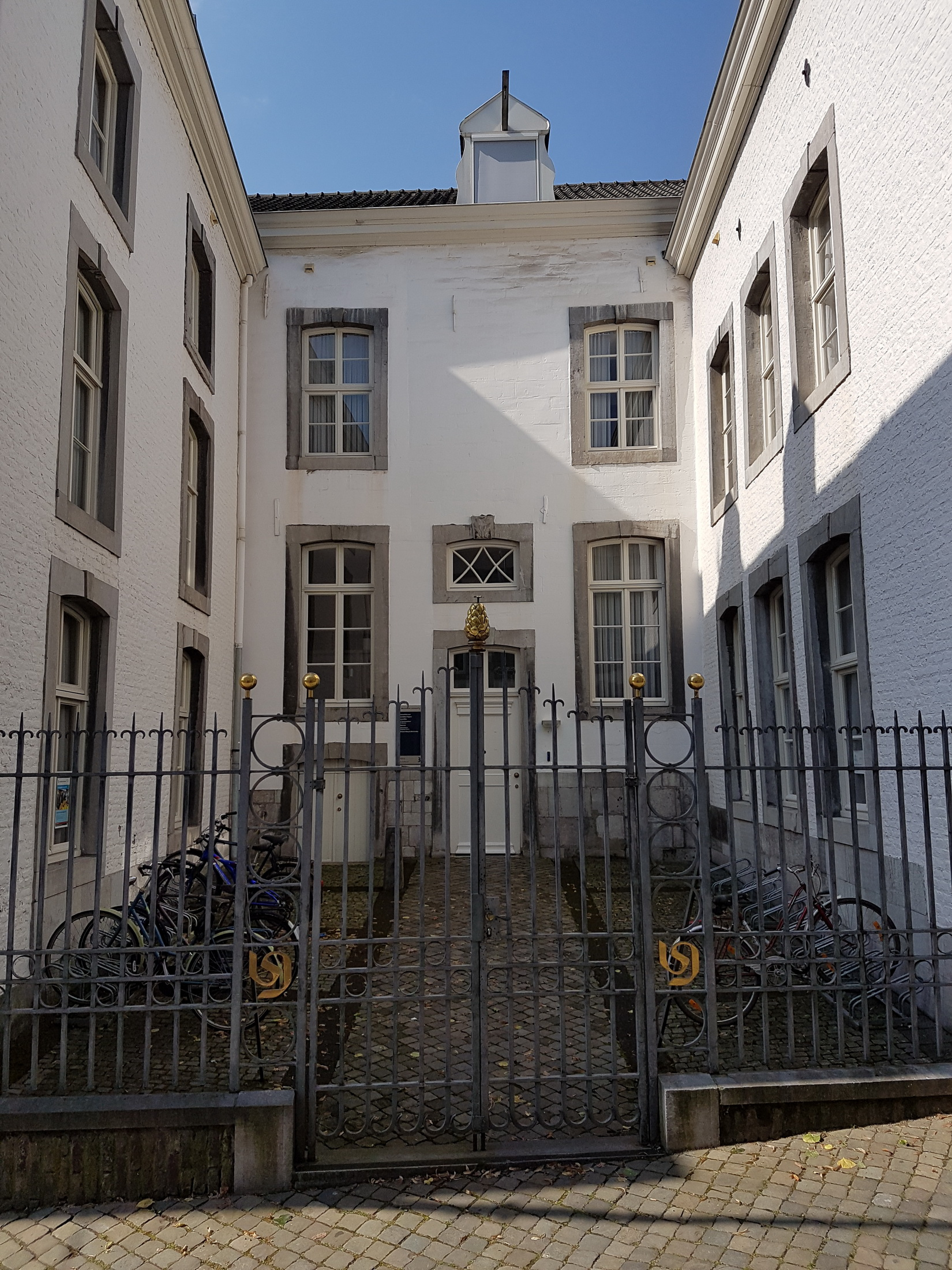
Sint Servaasklooster: canon's house, Language Centre

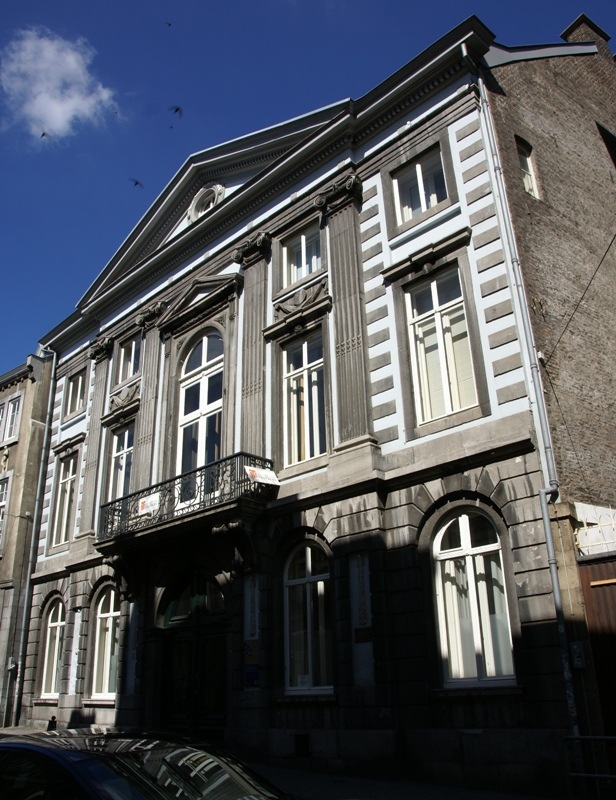
Grote Gracht: Soiron Mansion, FASoS

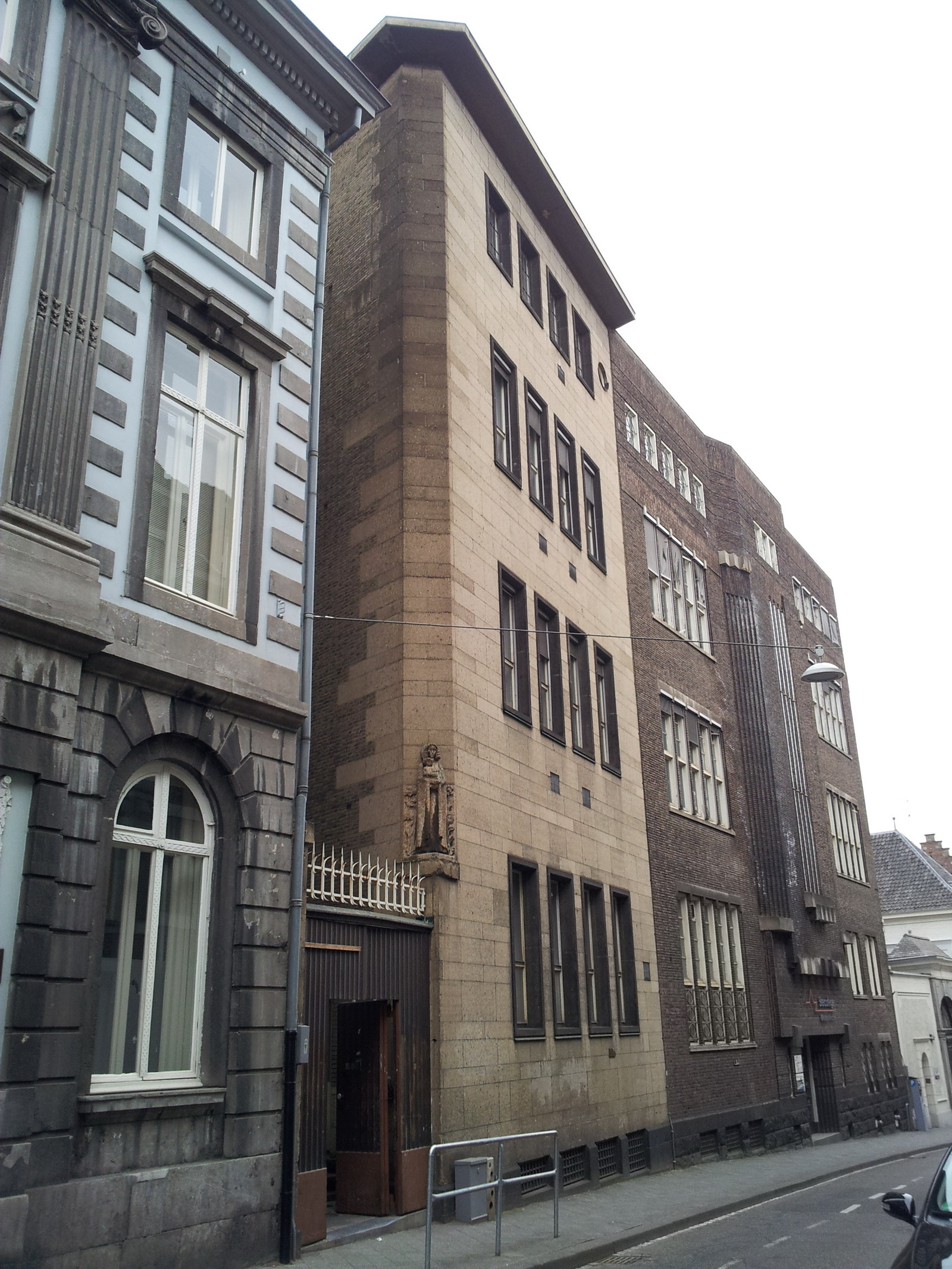
Grote Gracht: Ursuline schools, FASoS

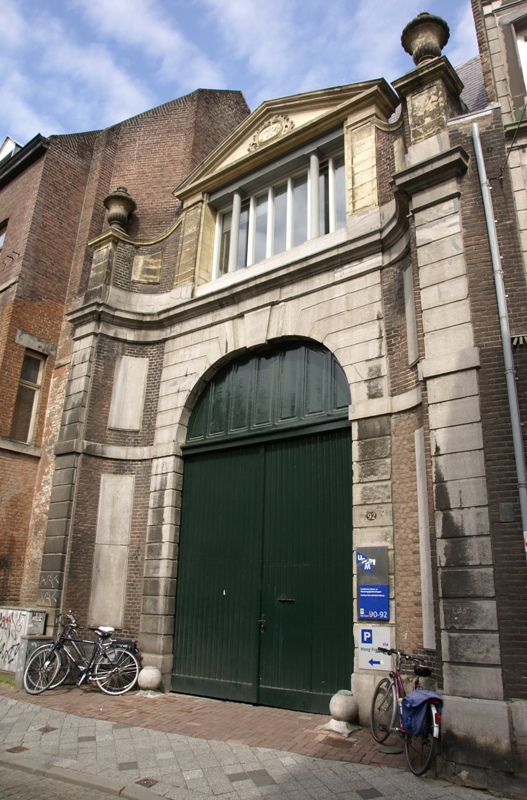
Grote Gracht: Tilly Mansion, FASoS

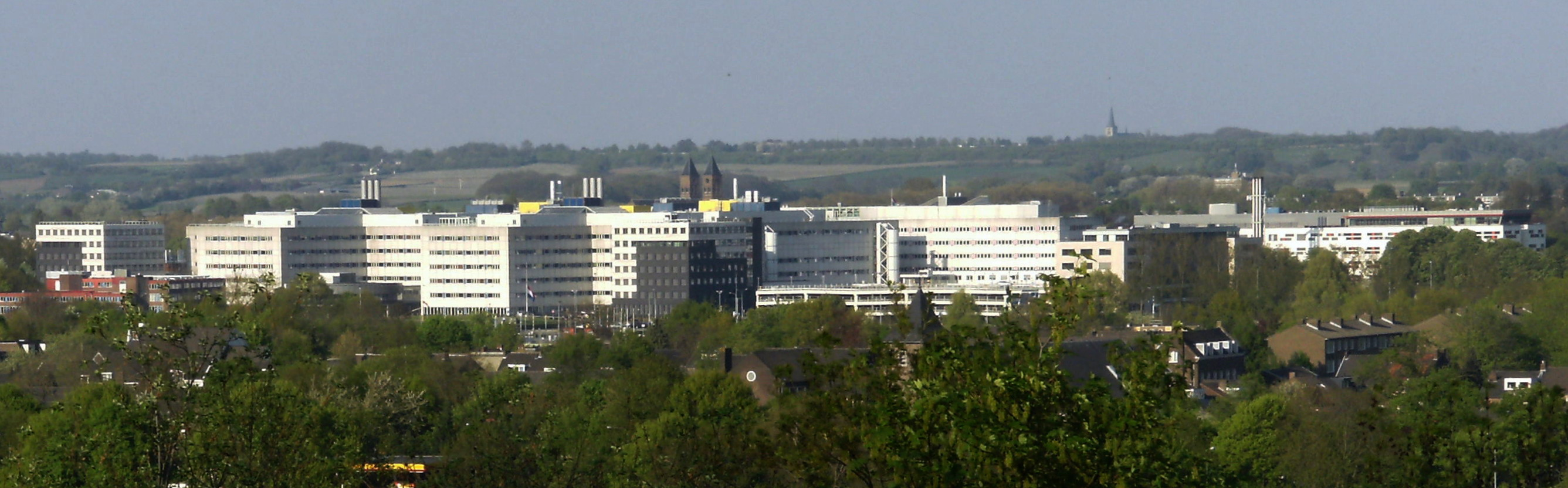
Campus Randwyck, seen from Mount Saint Peter

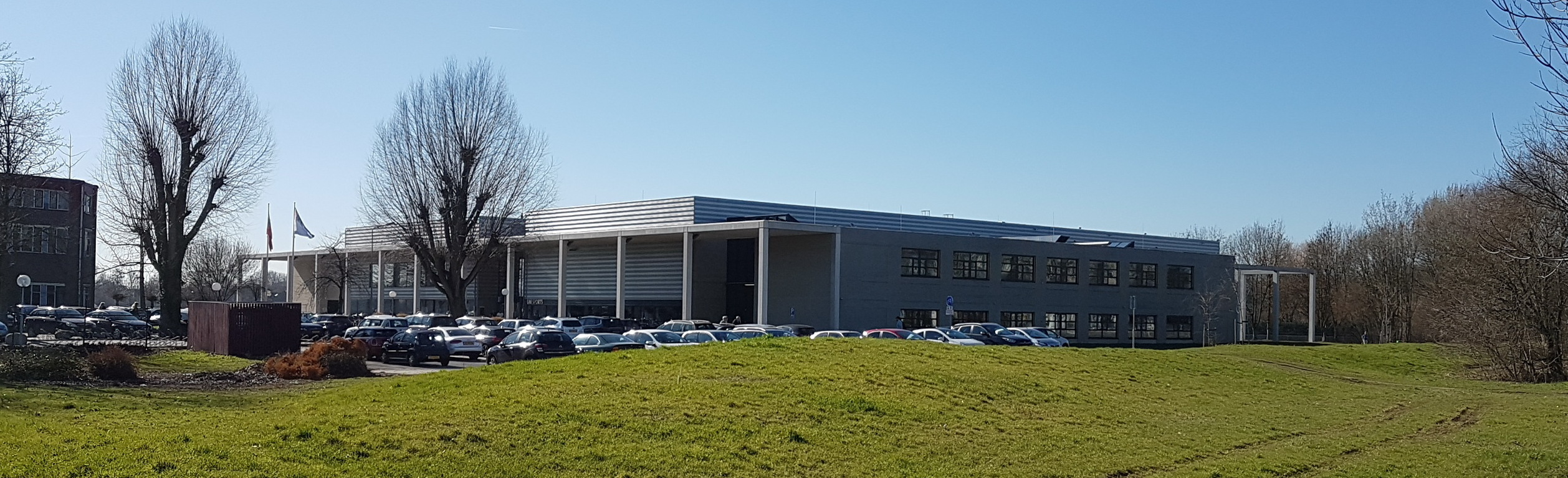
Sports facilities in Randwyck

=== Randwyck campus ===
The Randwyck campus was developed from the 1970s onwards and has become the center for the university's psychology, health, medicine and life science activities. Here, plans for the Brightlands Maastricht Health Campus are aimed at strengthening the scientific and economic impact of Randwyck. The Randwyck and Brightlands campuses are not to be confused with the failed Calatrava Campus, also in Randwyck, which in 2008 had to be abandoned after construction had already begun, because the cost spiraled out of control.

The focal point for the Randwyck campus is the academic hospital (azM), which moved here from its original location on the West bank of the Meuse river in 1992. Some of university buildings are physically connected to the hospital, built in the 1990s. The university and the AZM work together in the Maastricht University Medical Center+, established in 2008.

In 2019, UM bought an existing office building in Paul-Henri Spaaklaan. After refurbishment, the building now houses the Faculty of Science and Engineering and the Faculty of Health, Medicine and Life Sciences.

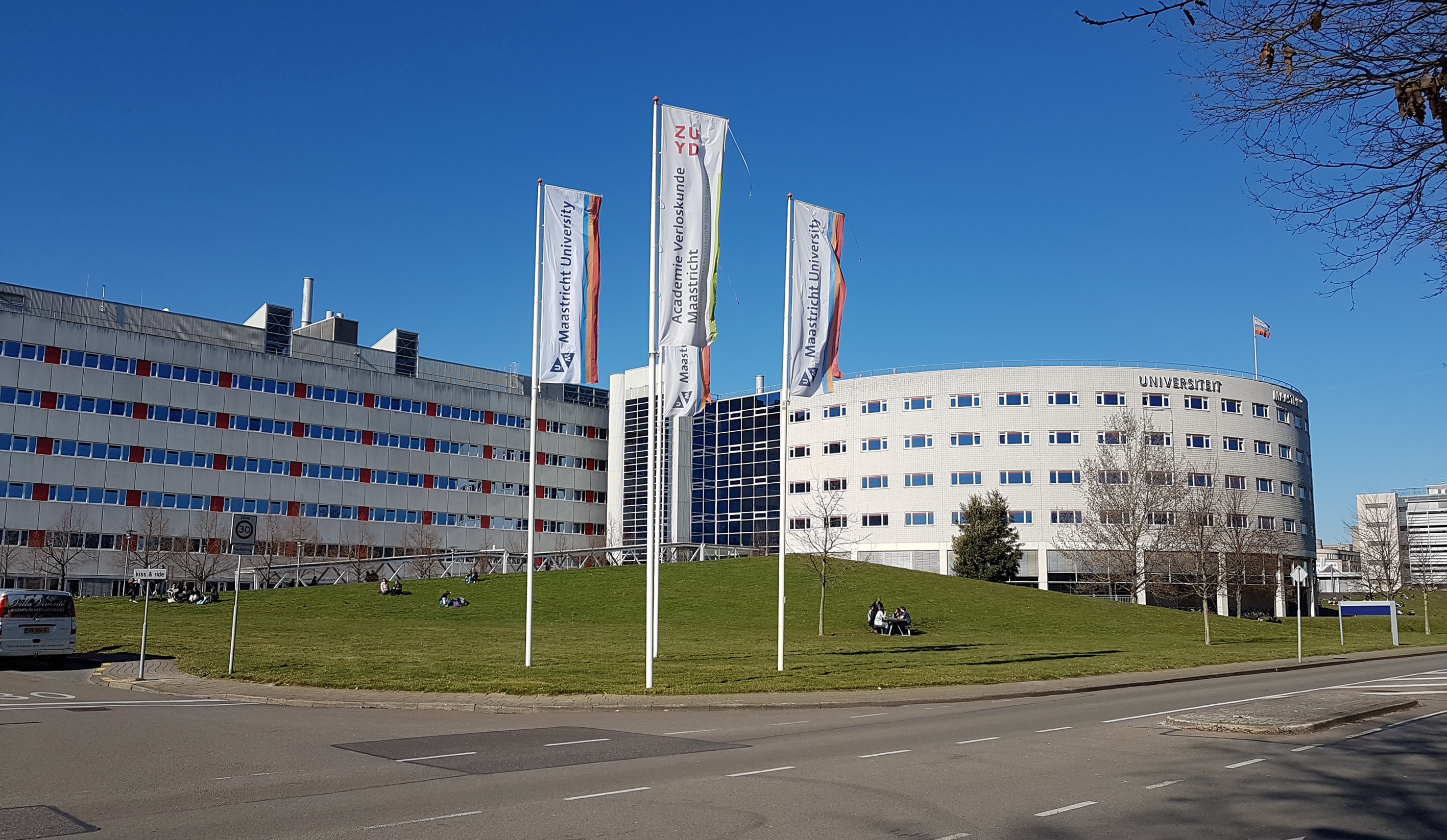
Faculty of Medicine

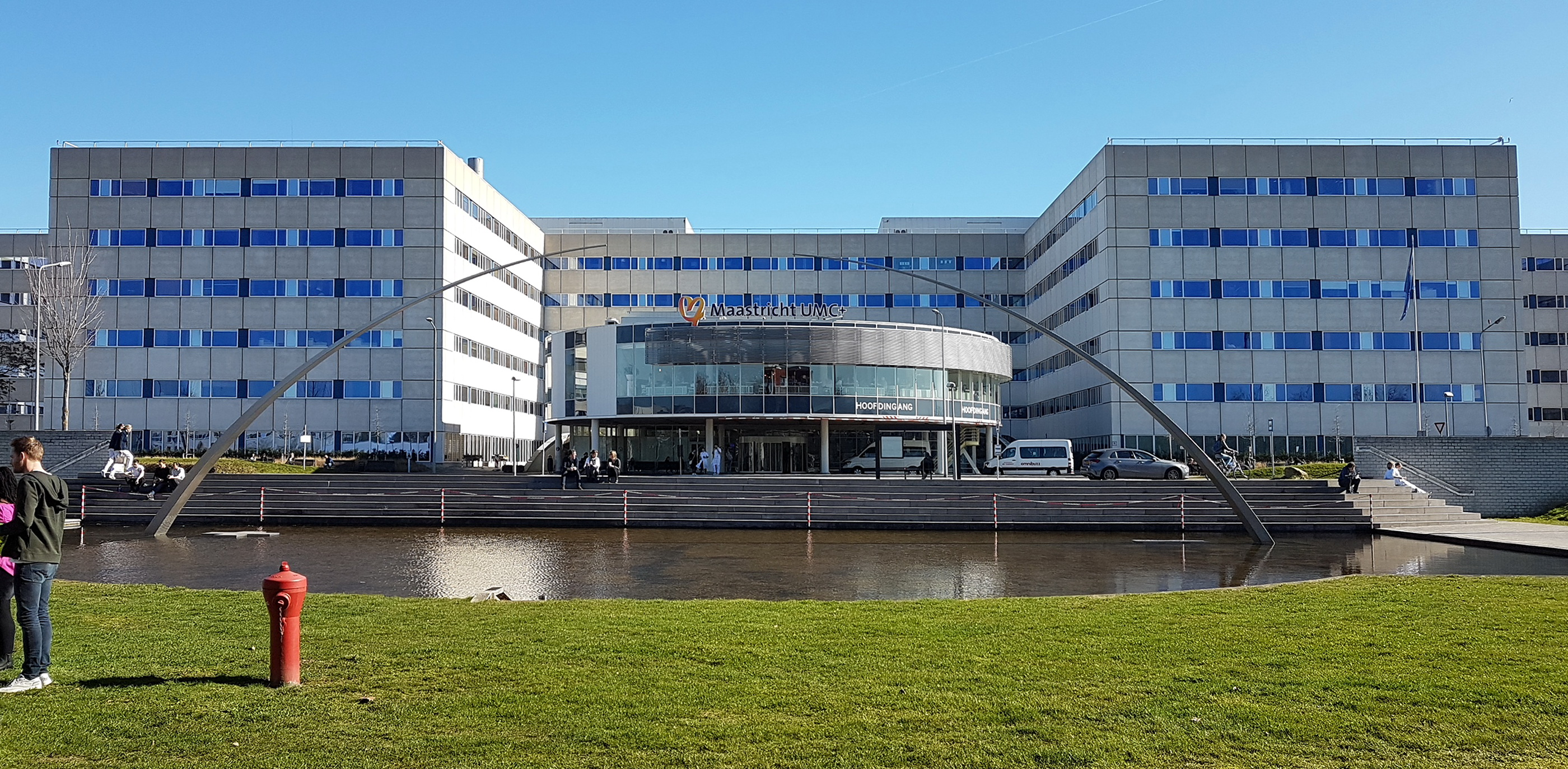
University hospital

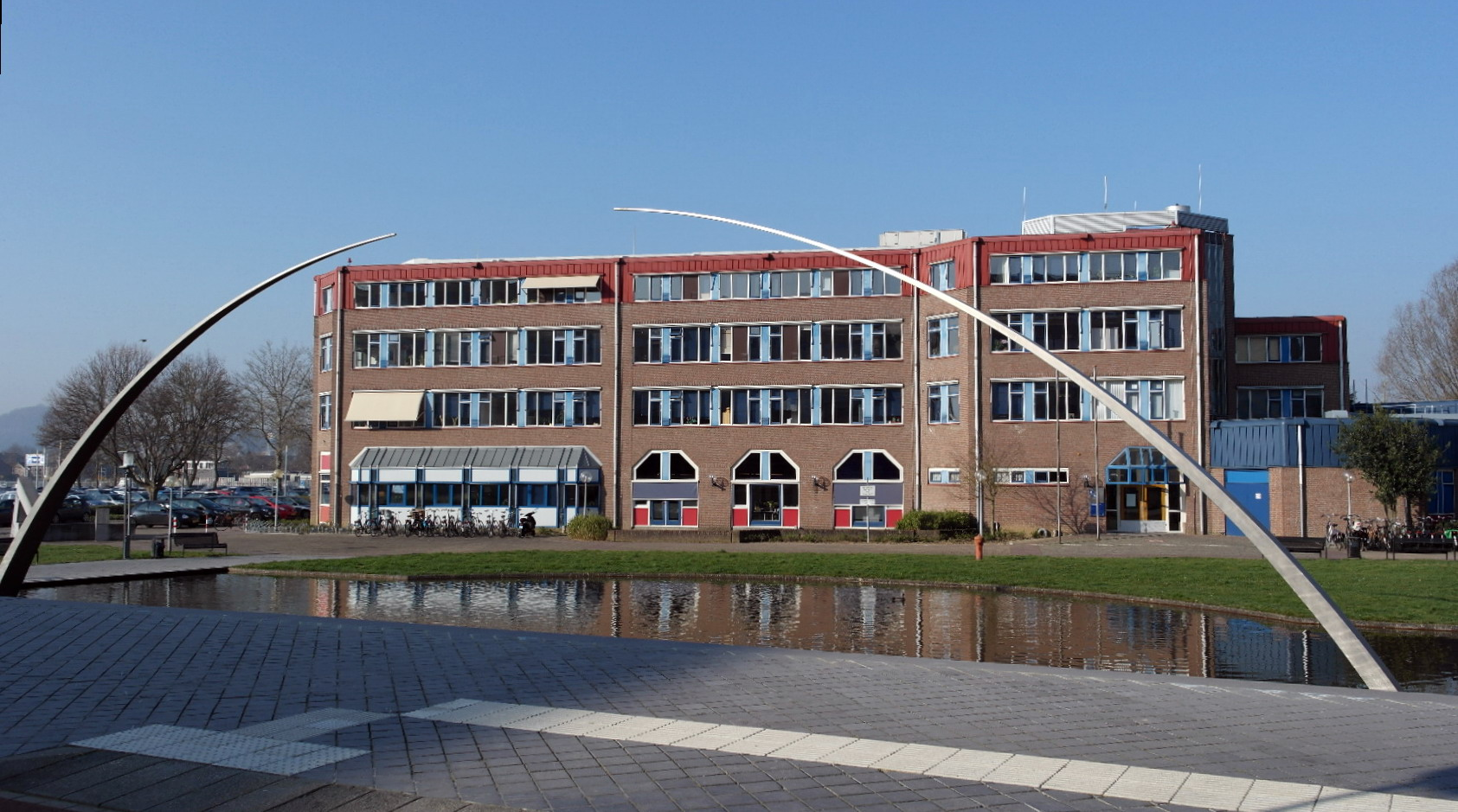
Peter Debyeplein 1

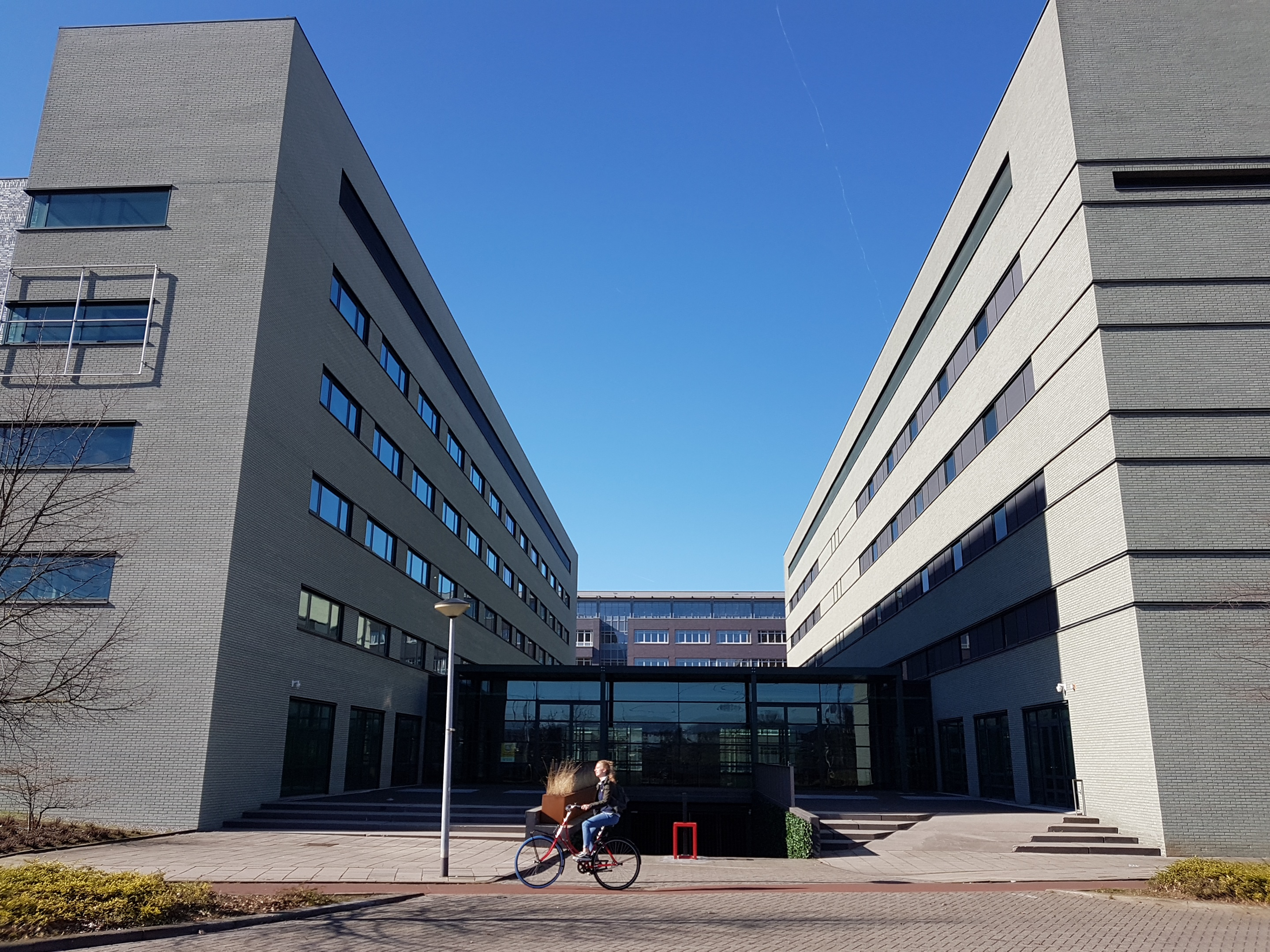
Paul-Henri Spaaklaan 1

=== Satellite campuses ===
In recent years, the university has opened offices in the northern Limburg city of Venlo, the Belgian capital of Brussels and the city of Bangalore, India.

The Maastricht University, Campus Venlo is located in the renovated "Raad van Arbeid" building at Nassaustraat, close to the center of Venlo. Maastricht University currently offers two Master's programmes (Global Supply Chain Management, and Health Food Innovation Management) and a Bachelor's programme (University College Venlo) at this campus. Courses at University College Venlo started in September 2015.

== Organisation ==
=== Governance ===
At the central level, the university is governed by the Executive Board, consisting of a president, a vice-president and a rector. The Executive Board appoints faculty deans, other administrators and professors and has general management responsibilities. It is advised by the Supervisory Council that vets for instance the budget. The University Council, an elected body representing all members of staff and students at the university, has a limited number of decision-making powers as well as general advising responsibilities regarding the university's teaching and research programmes and in organisational and budgetary matters.

Maastricht University's teaching and research programmes are primarily carried out along the lines of faculties. Within faculties, teaching and research activities may be further decentralised through departments, schools, institutes or colleges. The names of organisational (sub)units, however, do not necessarily indicate their position within the university's organisational hierarchy. In 2009, for example, the Faculty of Economics and Business Administration was renamed school of business and Economics, even though it maintains the rank of a faculty.

The Board of Deans, consisting of all faculty deans and the Rector, acts as a coordinating and consulting body at the central level and is responsible for awarding doctoral degrees and honorary doctorates.

=== Faculties ===
==== Faculty of Health, Medicine and Life Sciences ====
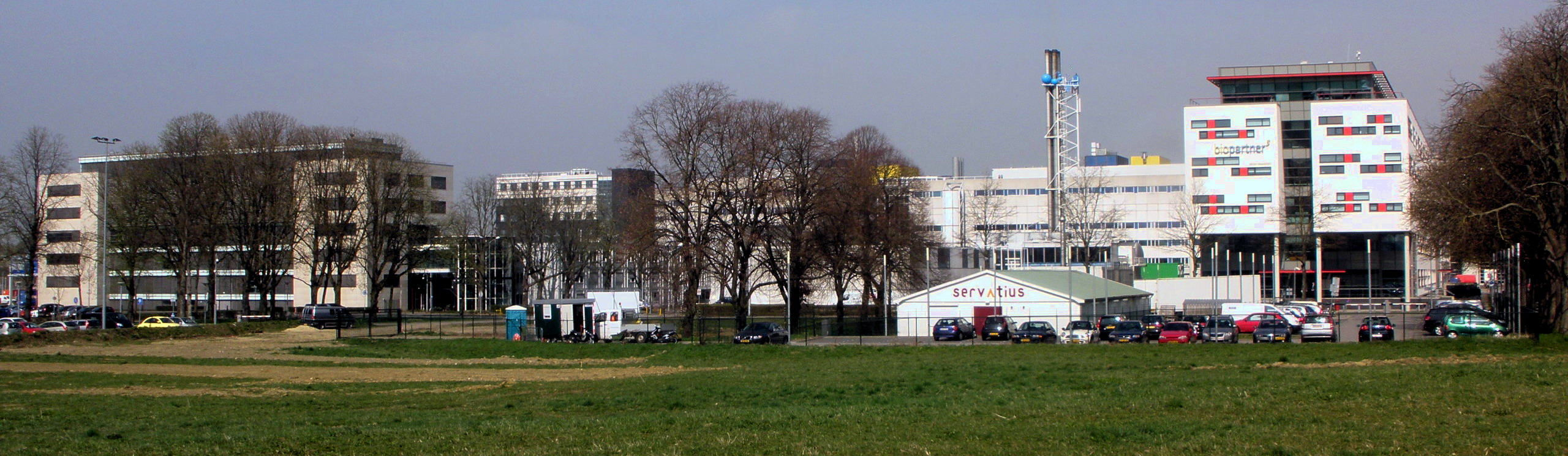
Life Sciences in Randwyck

The Faculty of Health, Medicine and Life Sciences (FHML) was established in 2007 as a merger between the faculty of health sciences and the faculty of medicine. The latter was the first faculty to be established at Maastricht University. In 1980 the faculty of health sciences was founded. The broad range of disciplines it offered in healthcare sciences, made the faculty unique, not only in the Netherlands, but also in Europe. The format allowed students to integrate their discipline and research work into all areas related to society, health and disease.

The two united faculties have developed into a community of approximately 1950 students, with a staff of around 1200 (academics, administrative and support staff). Since 1992 staff and students are based in the Randwyck district, near the University Hospital (Academisch Ziekenhuis Maastricht or AZM) which opened in 1991. The AZM has been renamed MUMC+ (Maastrichts Universitair Medisch Centrum Plus).

==== Faculty of Psychology and Neuroscience ====
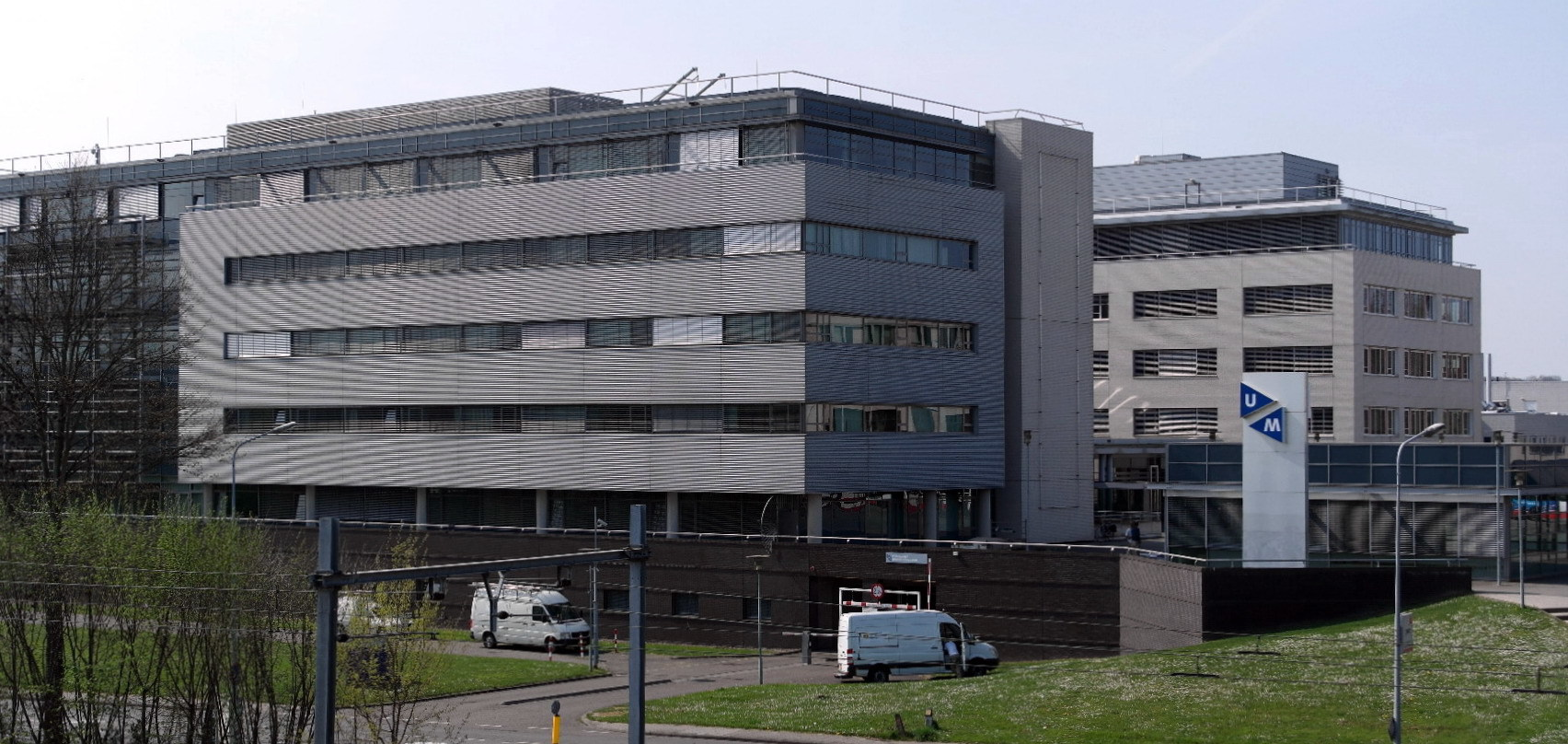
Psychology and Neuroscience, Randwyck

Founded in 1995, the Faculty of Psychology and Neuroscience (FPN) is specialised in two contemporary approaches in psychology: cognitive psychology and biological psychology. It is home to around 1,500 students and 250 staff. The faculty offers a Dutch and English bachelor's programme in psychology, two English-taught master's programmes and one research master's programme. The one-year master's programme in psychology offers specialisations in neuropsychology, developmental psychology, cognitive neuroscience, health and social psychology, psychology and law, work and organisational psychology. In conjunction with the faculty of health, Medicine and Life Sciences, the two-year research master Cognitive and Clinical Neuroscience offers six different specialisations: cognitive neuroscience, fundamental neuroscience, neuropsychology, drug development and neurohealth, neuroeconomics and psychopathology. The selective two-year master programme Forensic Psychology in English, offers theoretical, research and skills courses, to educate students to become scientist-practitioners in the field of forensic psychology and psychiatry. The faculty's unique research infrastructure – including hypermodern high field MRI scanners – allows for groundbreaking research into the brain and behaviour.

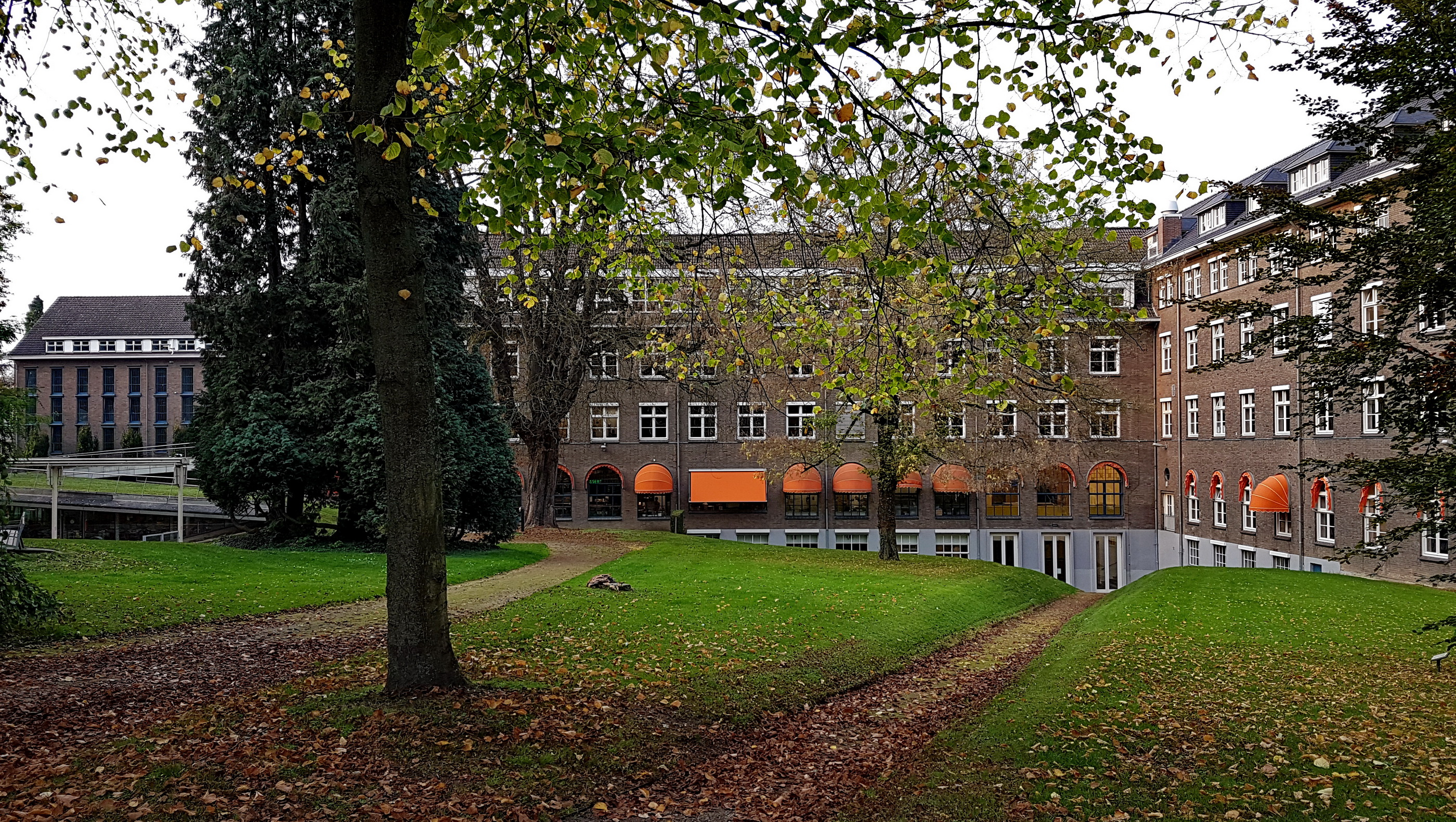
School of Business and Economics, Tongersestraat, garden view

==== School of Business and Economics ====
The School of Business and Economics (SBE) was founded in 1984. It is currently the biggest faculty within UM in terms of student numbers. Of the 4,200 students enrolled, more than 60% come from abroad. As a business school, SBE is accredited by EQUIS, AACSB and the Association of MBAs. According to the school's website, this Triple Crown accreditation has only been achieved by 1% of business schools worldwide. SBE offers bachelor's programmes (B.Sc.) in International Business, Business Engineering, Economics and Business Economics, Fiscal Economics, and Econometrics and Operations Research, as well as a number of master's programmes, executive master's programmes and MBA's. SBE students are represented by SCOPE Maastricht, the School's general student association.

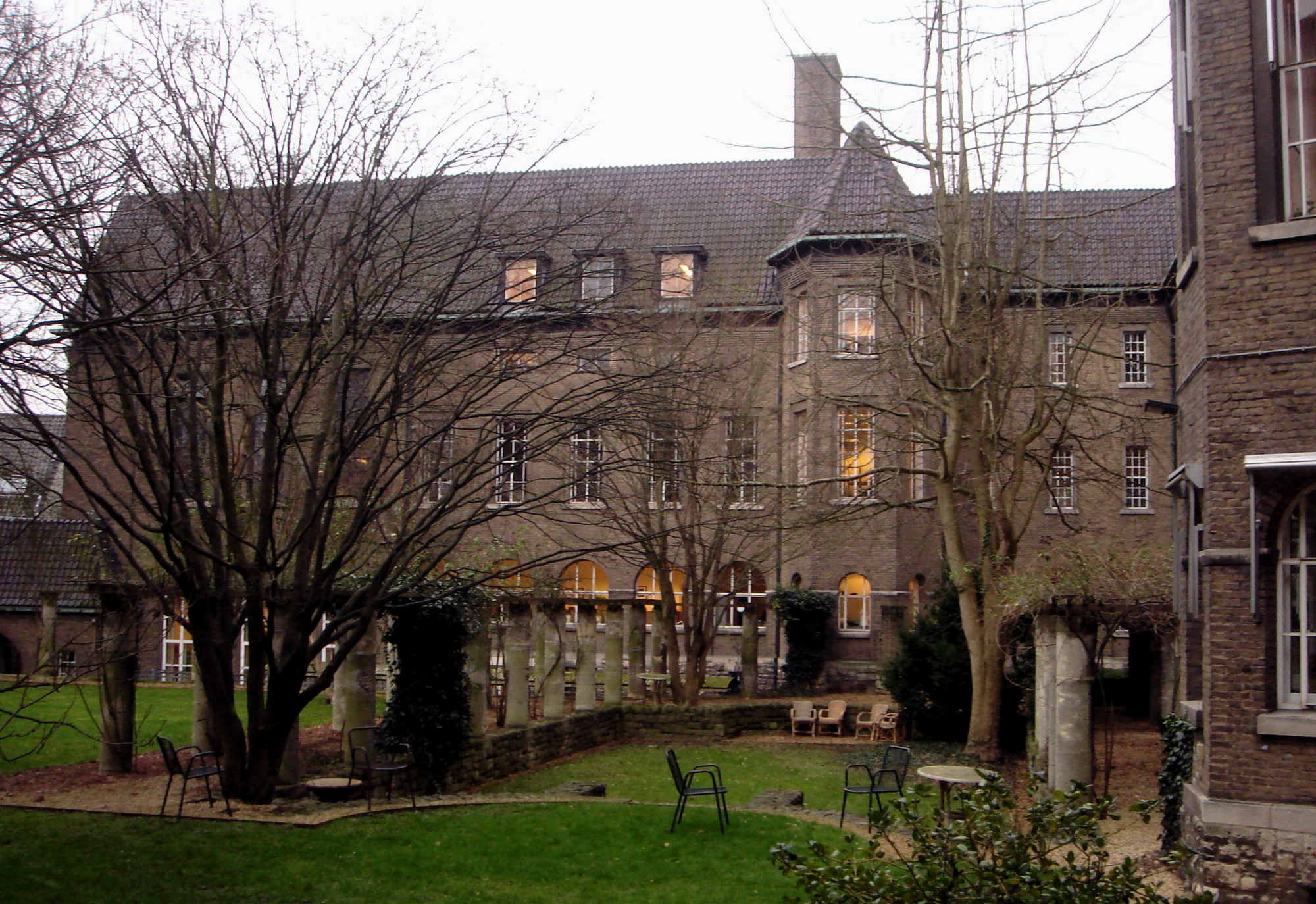
Faculty of Law, Bouillonstraat, garden view

==== Faculty of Law ====
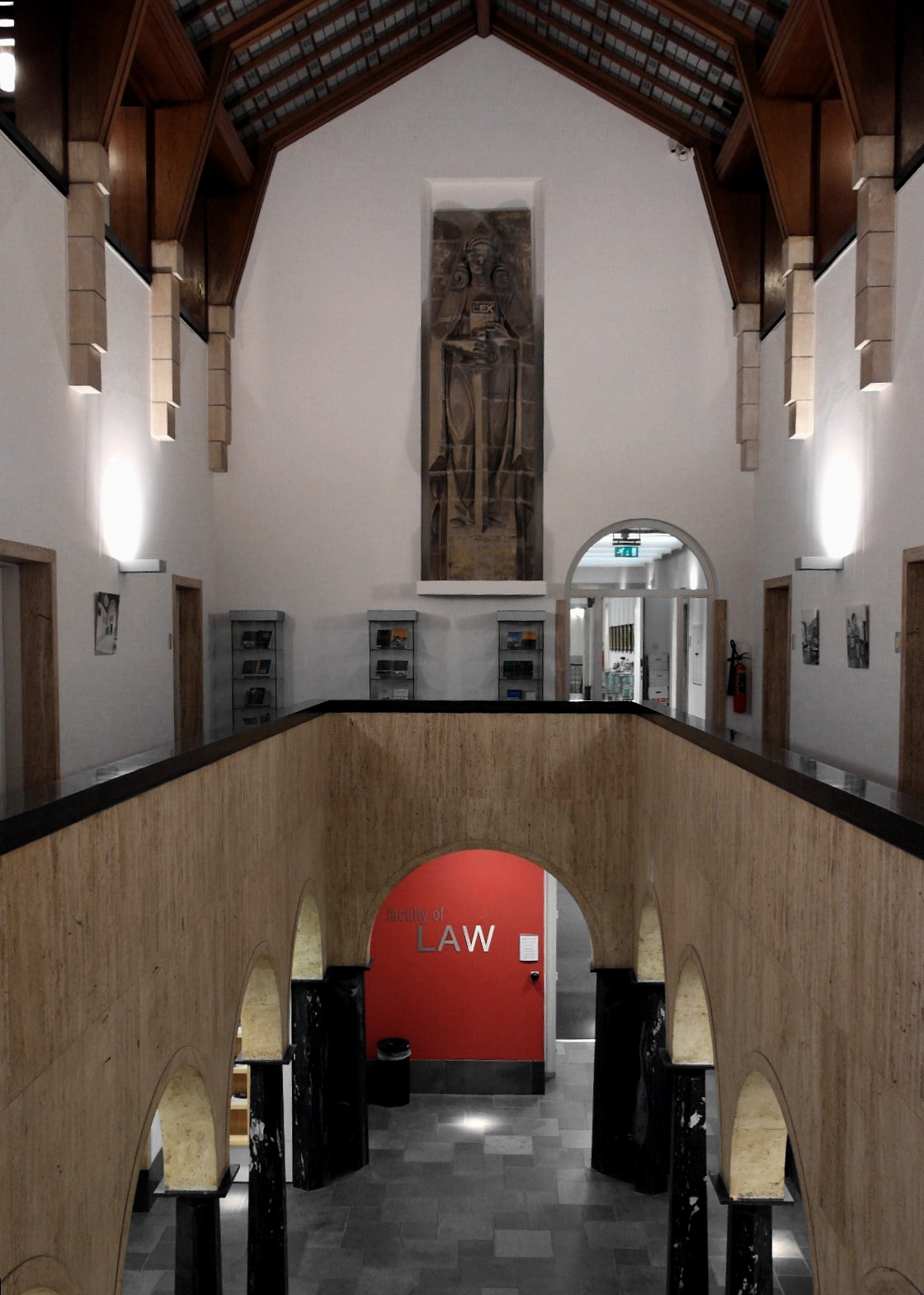
Faculty of Law, main hall, Lady Justice in the centre

Maastricht University's Faculty of Law (FL) was founded in 1981. Times Higher Education (THE) ranks the university's Law programme at 40th in the world in 2020. It started with a programme in Dutch law, designed in line with UM's problem-based learning principles. Ninety students enrolled in the first year. In the 1990s, the faculty introduced a new programme entitled the European Law School (ELS), which focused on European, comparative and international law. The programme was taught partly in English. A fully English-language ELS programme was established in 2007. It was the first English-language bachelor's programme in law in the Netherlands. The faculty currently consists of about 2,500 students and 150 members of staff. It offers four bachelor's (LL.B.) programmes: Dutch law, tax law, the Dutch-language ELS and the English-language ELS. In addition, the faculty offers seven master's (LL.M.) programmes and three advanced master's programmes, most of which are taught in English.

In research, the faculty's Graduate School of Law has built a reputation in the areas of international, European and comparative law. The faculty participates in two national research schools, the School of Human Rights and the Ius Commune Research School, and is home to several research institutes: the Institute for Transnational Legal Research (METRO), the Maastricht Centre for Human Rights, the Institute for Globalisation and International Regulation (IGIR), the Montesquieu Institute Maastricht, the Institute for Corporate Law, Governance and Innovation Policies (ICGI), and the Maastricht European Private Law Institute (M-EPLI).

The faculty was initially located at the Nieuwenhof béguinage, currently home to University College Maastricht. With the number of students growing quickly, the faculty moved to its current location in 1990. This building, the former seat of the provincial government of Limburg, consists of tutorial rooms, lecture halls as well as staff offices. The building underwent major renovation works around 2009, which included a new common room and lunch counter for students, a garden terrace, and an additional lecture hall in the former ballroom.

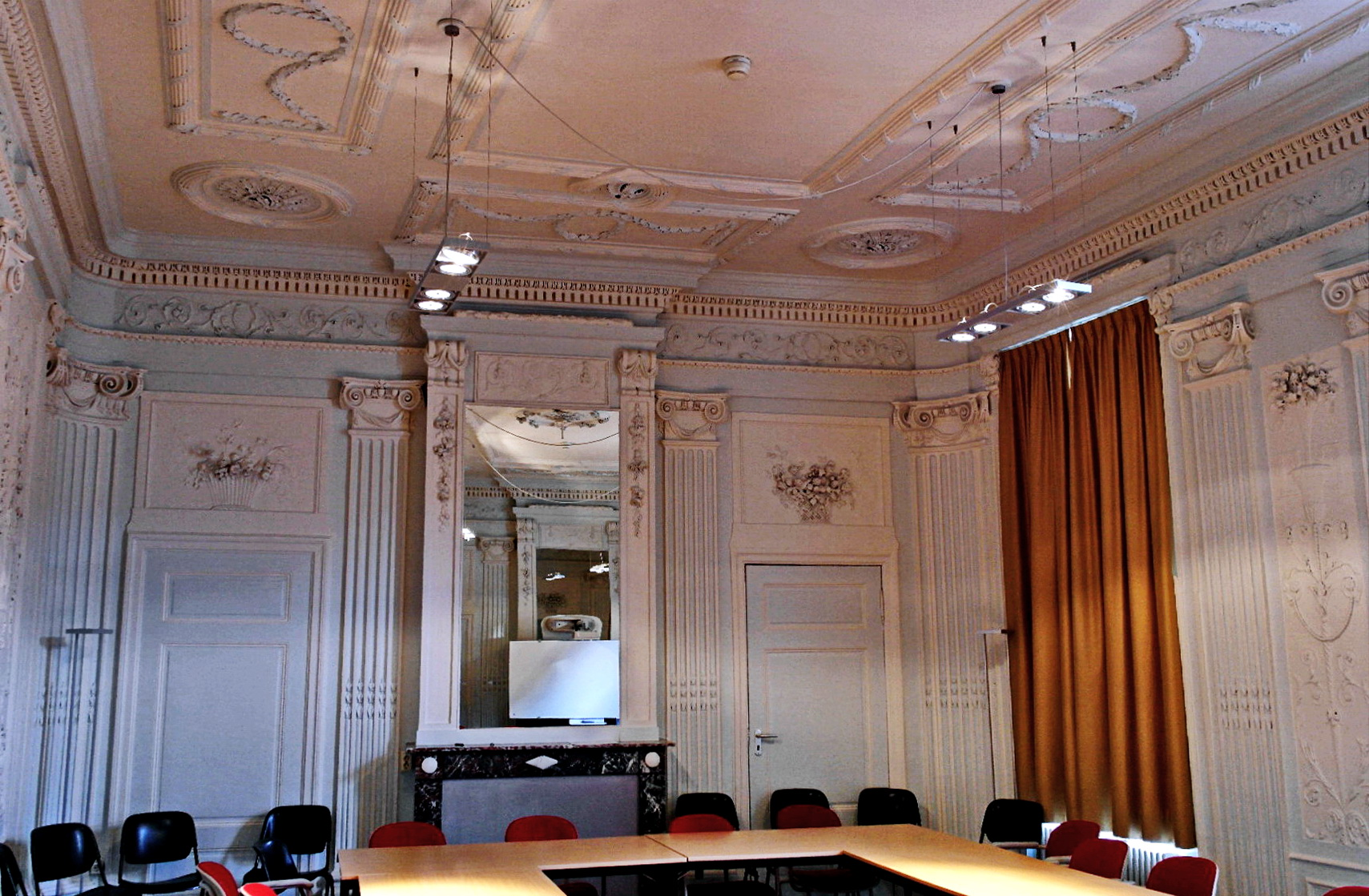
'Classy' classroom in Soiron Mansion with 18th-century stucco (FASoS)

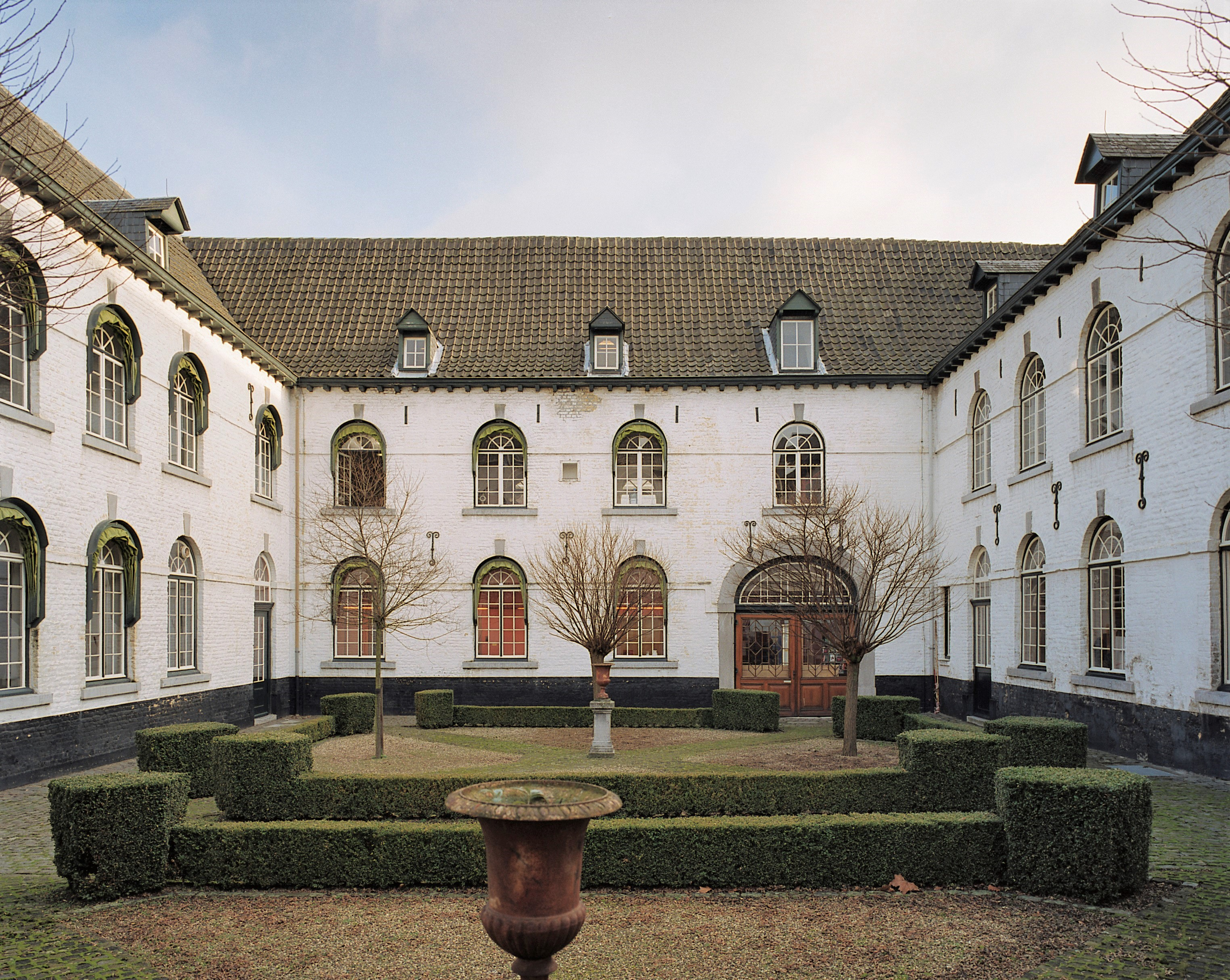
Former Nieuwenhof nunnery, University College Maastricht

==== Faculty of Arts and Social Sciences ====
The Faculty of Arts and Social Sciences, also known as FASoS, was founded in 1994. Currently FASoS hosts approximately 2000 students and around 240 staff members. Over 70% of the students are non-Dutch. Research and education is internationally oriented and all of the programmes are offered in English. The faculty is located in the centre of Maastricht, in four buildings on the Grote Gracht.

The Faculty of Arts and Social Sciences offers four three-year bachelors programmes: Cultuurwetenschappen/Arts and Culture, European Studies, Digital Society and Global Studies, and eight one-year masters programmes: European Studies; Globalisation and Development Studies; European Public Affairs; European Studies on Society, Science and Technology; Arts and Heritage; Policy, Management and Culture; Media Culture; Art, Literature and Society; and Politics and Society. Furthermore, two two-year research masters are offered: Cultures of Arts, Science and Technology; and European Studies.

The Research Institute for Arts and Social Sciences encompasses all research of the Faculty of Arts and Social Sciences. The Research Institute comprises four programmes: 1. Politics and Culture in Europe, 2. Science, Technology and Society, 3. Cultural Memory and Diversity and 4. Globalisation, Transnationalism and Development. The research area overlaps both the humanities and the social sciences. The faculty has a graduate school with an intake of about 10 PhD candidates each year.

==== Faculty of Science and Engineering ====
The Faculty of Science and Engineering (FSE), formerly the Faculty of Humanities and Sciences, consists of:

- University College Maastricht (UCM)
- University College Venlo (UCV)
- Department of Advanced Computing Sciences (DACS)
- Maastricht Science Programme (MSP)
- Foundation Programme (FP)
- TIER: Top Institute for Evidence Based Education Research

=== Tuition and financial assistance ===
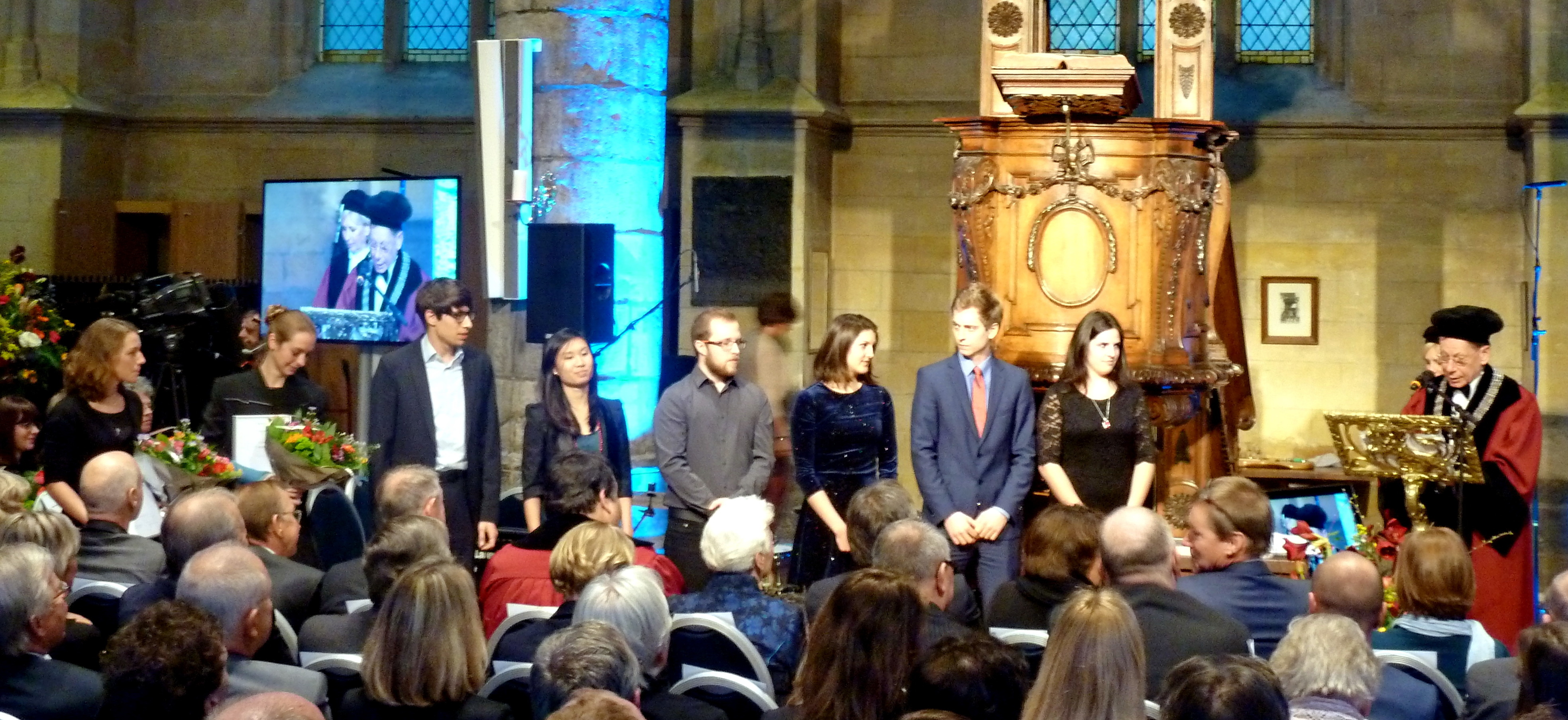
Students receiving honours from rector Luc Soete at UM's dies natalis

Tuition fees at Maastricht University vary, depending on nationality and study programme. Regular tuition fees for public universities in the Netherlands are determined annually by law. Statutory tuition fees currently amount to €2,771 annually for full-time bachelor's and master's programmes. Under European regulations, statutory tuition fees are also applicable to foreign students from the European Economic Area, which includes all European Union member states. All other students pay institutional tuition fees, ranging from €13,400 to €32,000 annually for bachelor's programmes and €21,800 to €32,000 annually for master's programmes. Since 2012, students at the University College pay a surcharge on top of the statutory or institutional tuition fees to fund additional facilities, a student grants programme and student organisations at the college. An earlier plan to introduce a separate institutional fee at the University College was shelved after criticism from staff and students.

Ph.D. candidates (promovendi) at Maastricht University do not pay tuition as they have the rank of junior members of the academic staff. Ph.D. candidates are employed by the university or faculty on full-time, four-year contracts with regular, entry-level wages and employee benefits. Ph.D. appointments usually involve teaching responsibilities and limited administrative duties.

The Limburg University Fund, a fundraising foundation associated with the UM, administers a scholarship fund for students from emerging markets.

== Academic life ==
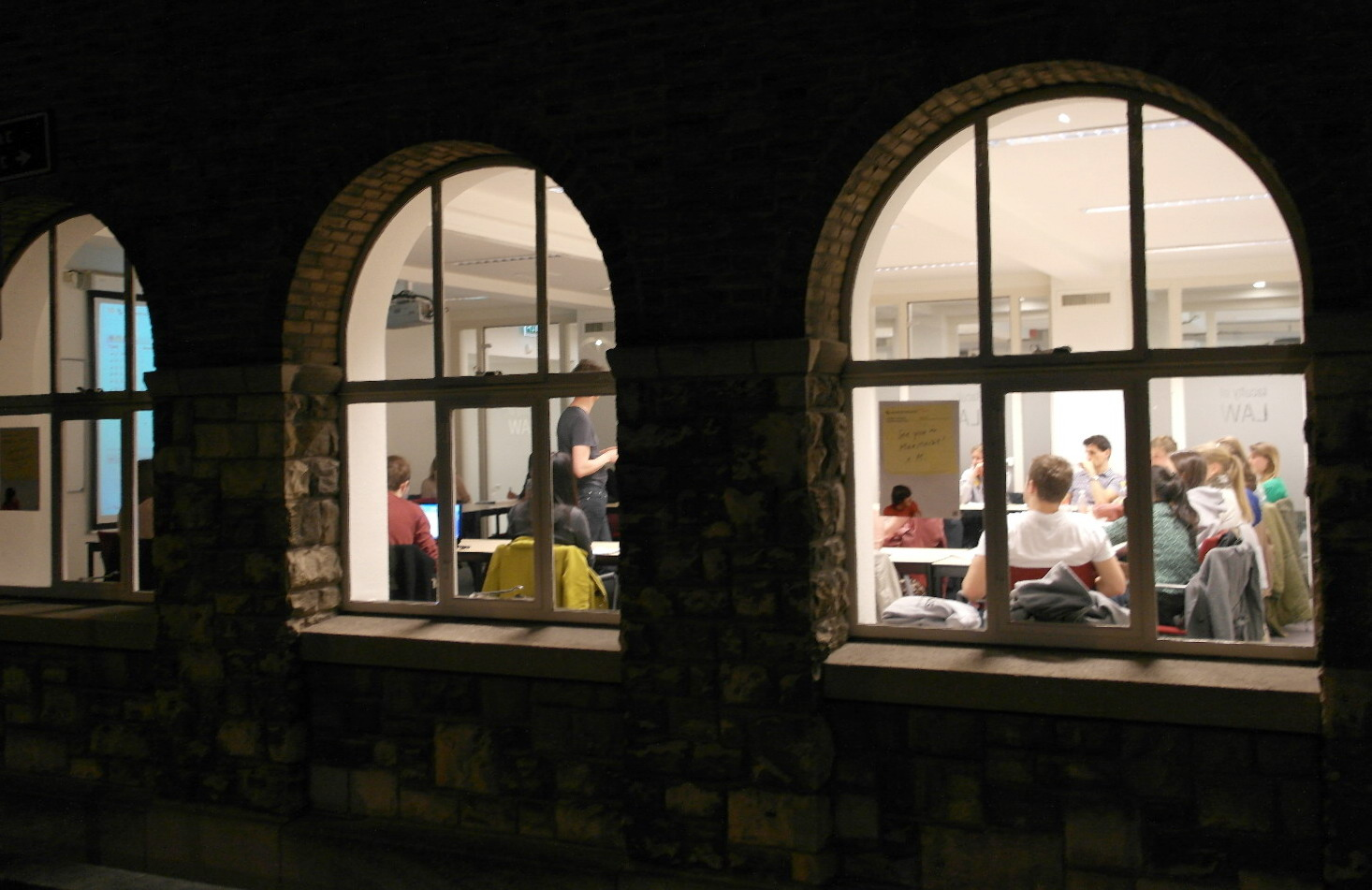
Law students at work, Bouillonstraat

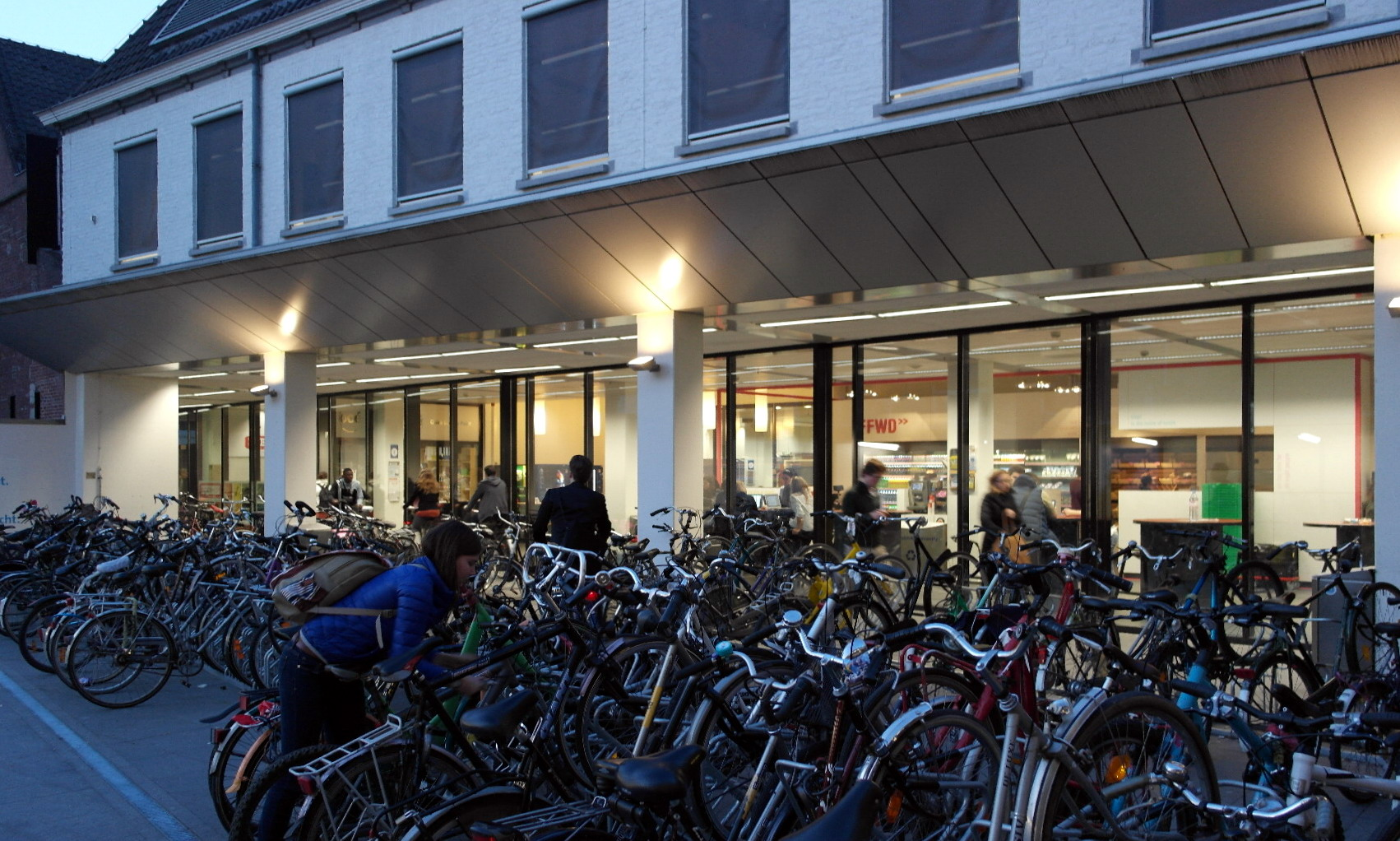
University library, inner city branch at Nieuwenhofstraat

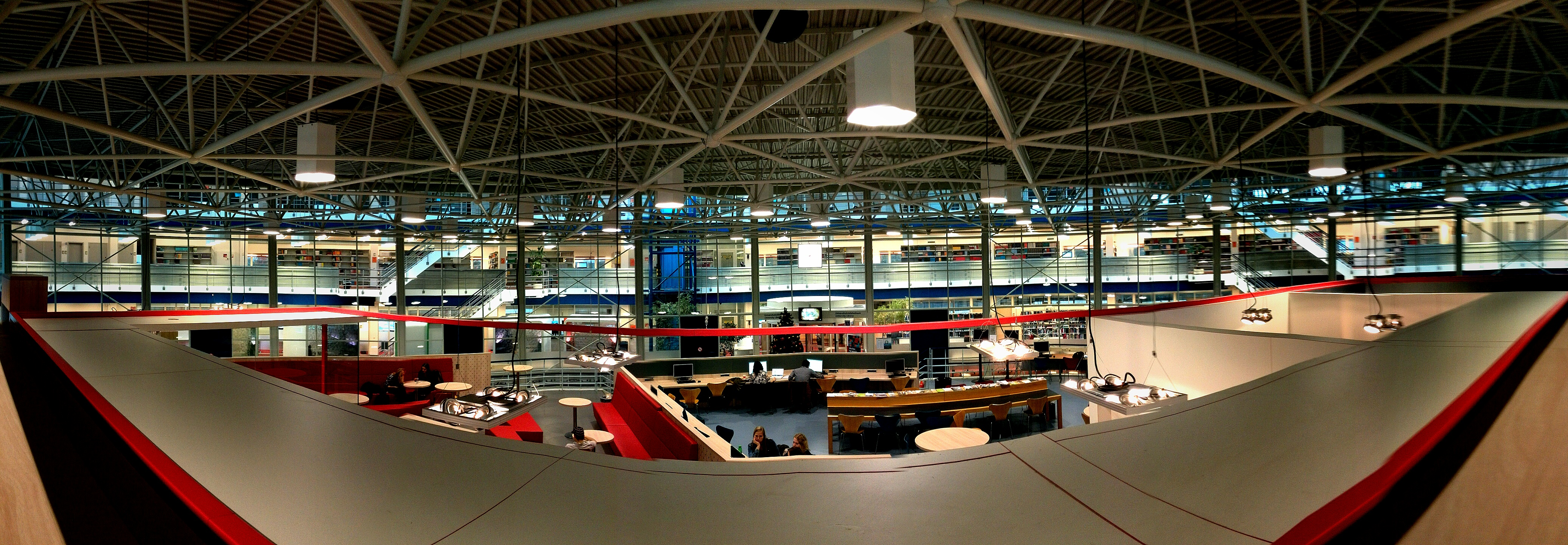
University library, Randwyck branch

=== Staff ===
Maastricht University's academic staff consists of about 1,900 members with a male/female ratio of 54/46. The number of support staff members amounts to 1,600, of which about 62% is female. Nearly 20% of UM's staff members hold a foreign nationality. In 2014 about 17% of professors at Maastricht University were women, which is more or less the average in the Netherlands.

=== Teaching ===
Maastricht University awards degrees at all levels up to the title of doctor.

Teaching at Maastricht University is founded on the educational principles of problem-based learning (PBL). According to its website, UM is the only university which applies the problem-based learning approach in all its educational programmes. In 1974, Maastricht's newly established faculty of medicine was only the second in the world to adopt the problem-based learning method. As PBL was originally designed for medical education, other faculties have developed a PBL approach that corresponds with the needs of their academic disciplines.

At the heart of Maastricht's PBL philosophy is the idea that students are personally responsible for their own academic education. A typical UM course revolves around so-called 'tutorial groups'. A tutorial group usually consists of 14 to 16 students, meeting once or twice a week to discuss self-identified problems on the basis of cases or situations described in the course manual. Each tutorial meeting consists of two parts: a post-discussion, where problems which have been identified at the previous session are discussed on the basis of assigned literature and sometimes with additional library research, followed by a pre-discussion of topics to be discussed at the next meeting. The tutorial group is chaired by a student member, who is expected to structure the discussion and ensure that every member of the group is able to participate. The instructor, typically named 'tutor', plays only a limited role during tutorials. Tutors will monitor discussions, provide feedback, and, where needed, help students in identifying relevant problems. Courses usually take seven weeks of tutorials followed by a final exam, but may also include writing or speaking assignments.

Even though traditional lecture-based teaching is at odds with the primarily self-guiding PBL approach, it has become customary in many programmes at Maastricht to include at least some lectures in courses to supplement the tutorial-based structure. Also, electronic learning methods are increasingly being used. As PBL courses are intensive, students can take only two or three courses at a time depending on the number of credit hours per course. The university's Language Centre offers an introduction to Maastricht's PBL approach for international students.

=== Rankings and reputation ===
University rankings

Global – Overall
- ARWU World: 201–300 (2024)
- CWTS World: 174 (2020)
- QS World: 239 (2026)
- QS Under 50: 19 (2021)
- THE World: =132 (2025)
- THE Young Universities: 6 (2021)
- USNWR Global: =179 (2025)

According to Times Higher Education (THE) World University Rankings 2016, Maastricht University occupied 88th (121st as of 2021) position in the world ranking. QS World University Rankings 2017/18 ranked Maastricht University as the 200th best university in the world, while Academic Ranking of World Universities (or Shanghai Ranking) counted Maastricht among the world's top 300 universities, since 2011.

In the QS Top 50 Under 50, which ranks the top 50 universities under 50 years old around the world, UM reached the 19th place in 2021.

In a similar list published by THE (THE 100 Under 50 universities 2021), Maastricht University was placed at the 6th in the world.

In terms of specific areas of studies, THE ranks Maastricht University at 23rd in the field of "Law," 64th in "Clinical & health" and 72nd in "Business & Economics" in the world for 2022. The Financial Times places the school of business and Economics at the 60th place in 2016.

The School of Business and Economics has been awarded the 'Triple accreditation' by the prestigious AACSB, EQUIS and AMBA.

In addition to medicine, business, and law programs, Maastricht University may perhaps be best known for the reputation of its psychology department attracting students and researchers from across the world. Within the domain of biological psychology, Maastricht University is ranked 5th in the world. Among its facilities, Maastricht University has one of only 5 fully operational Tesla 9.4 MRI scanners found worldwide allowing for ground breaking research in fields of psychology, psychiatry and neuroscience. Furthermore, Maastricht University is also ranked 5th in the world in fields of education and educational research.

=== Research ===
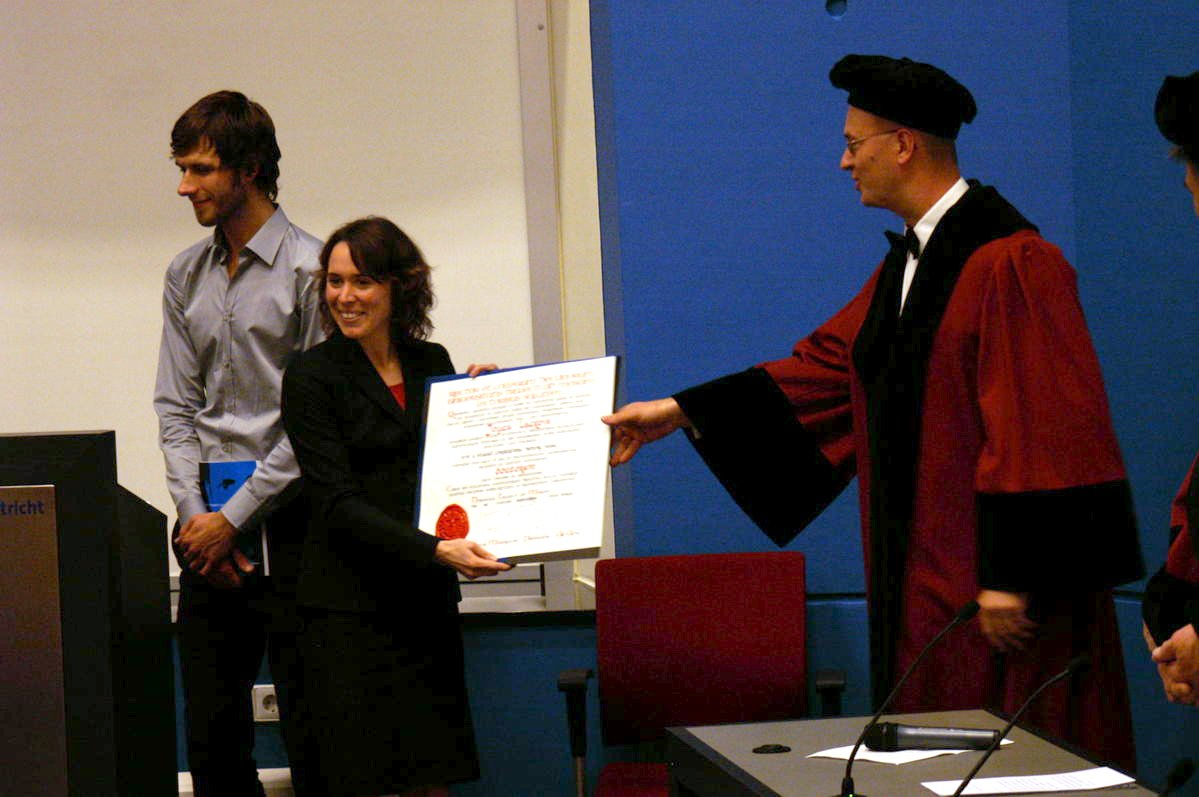
Ph.D. conferral at UM

Research at Maastricht University concentrates on three major themes: Quality of Life, Learning and Innovation and Europe and a Globalising World. Examples of issues addressed through UM research are: healthy ageing, climate change, demographic changes, sustainability, the impact of technological developments, population ageing, healthy and affordable food, and the European integration process. A lot of this research is conducted in multidisciplinary teams and in institutes such as CARIM, the School for Cardiovascular Diseases.

A noted research platform is Scannexus (formerly known as: Brains Unlimited): a scanning lab at the Brightlands Maastricht Health Campus, offering three MRI scanners with ultrahigh magnetic fields, including one of only four 9.4 Tesla scanners worldwide. Professor Rainer Goebel, director of the affiliated Maastricht Brain Imaging Centre (M-Bic), has been rewarded several large international research grants. The internationally renowned Tissue Regeneration group of Professor Clemens van Blitterswijk moved to Maastricht University in February 2014. His presence fits in the large investment programme Kennis-As Limburg, that aims to strengthen the provincial knowledge economy. So does the Institute of Nanoscopy, led by Professor Peter Peters.

In 2011 the number of dissertations at the University of Maastricht had reached 213; the number of scientific publications 3,567. Most PhD programmes take place in faculty research units (so-called graduate schools) or associated institutes.

==== Research and graduate schools ====
- Research and graduate schools affiliated to the faculty of health, Medicine and Life Sciences:
  - Netherlands School of Primary Care (CaRe)
  - School for Public Health and Primary Care (CAPHRI), linked to CaRe and WTMC
  - School for Cardiovascular Diseases (CARIM)
  - School for Oncology and Developmental Biology (GROW)
  - School of Nutrition and Translational Research in Metabolism (NUTRIM)
  - School of Health Professions Education (SHE), linked to ICO
- Research and graduate schools of the Faculty of Psychology and Neuroscience:
  - Graduate School Psychology and Neuroscience (GSPN), linked to EPOS, EPP, EURON, Psychology and Health, and M-Bic
  - European Graduate School of Neuroscience (EURON)
  - School for Mental Health and Neuroscience (MHeNS), linked to EURON

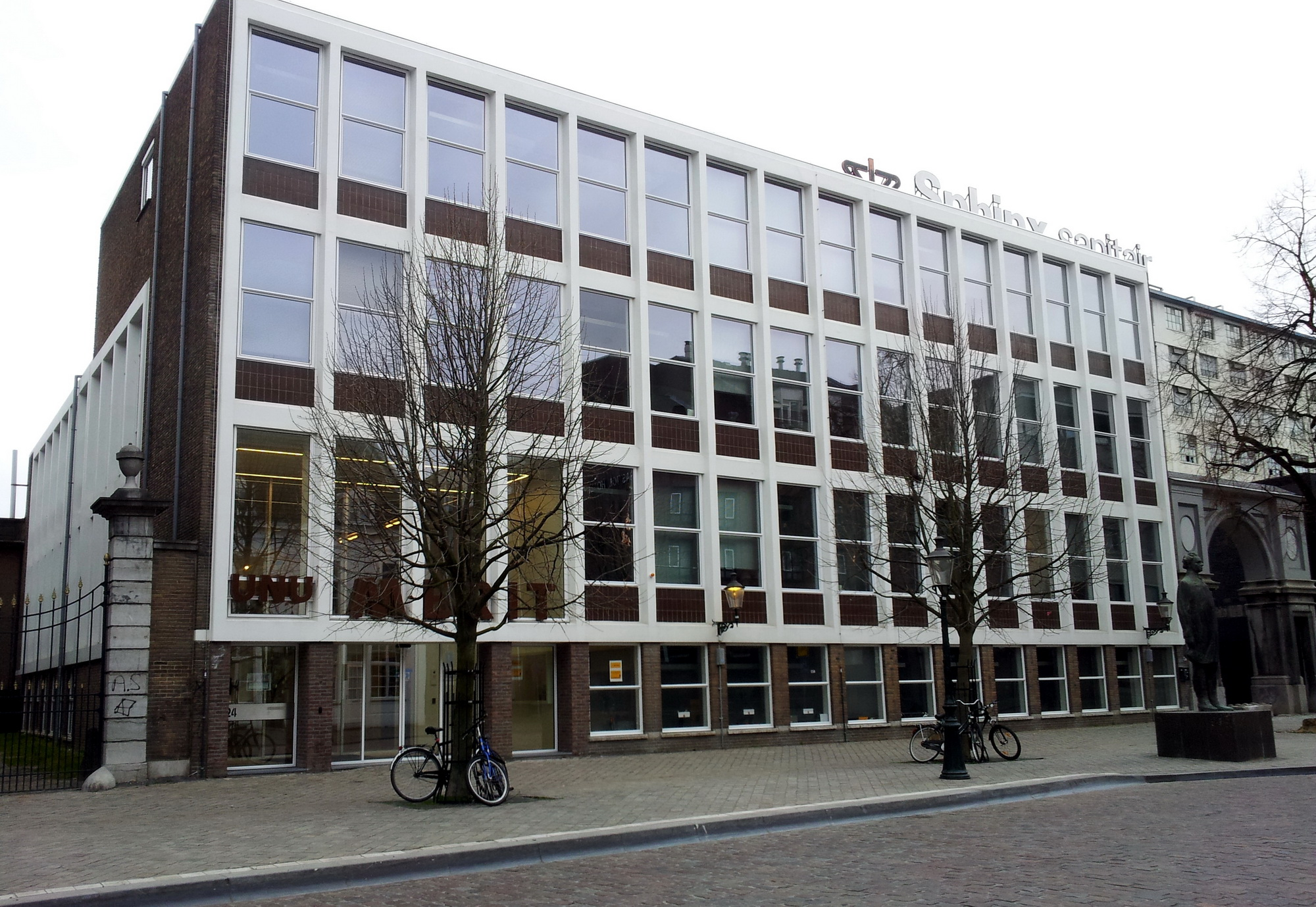
UNU-MERIT at Boschstraat

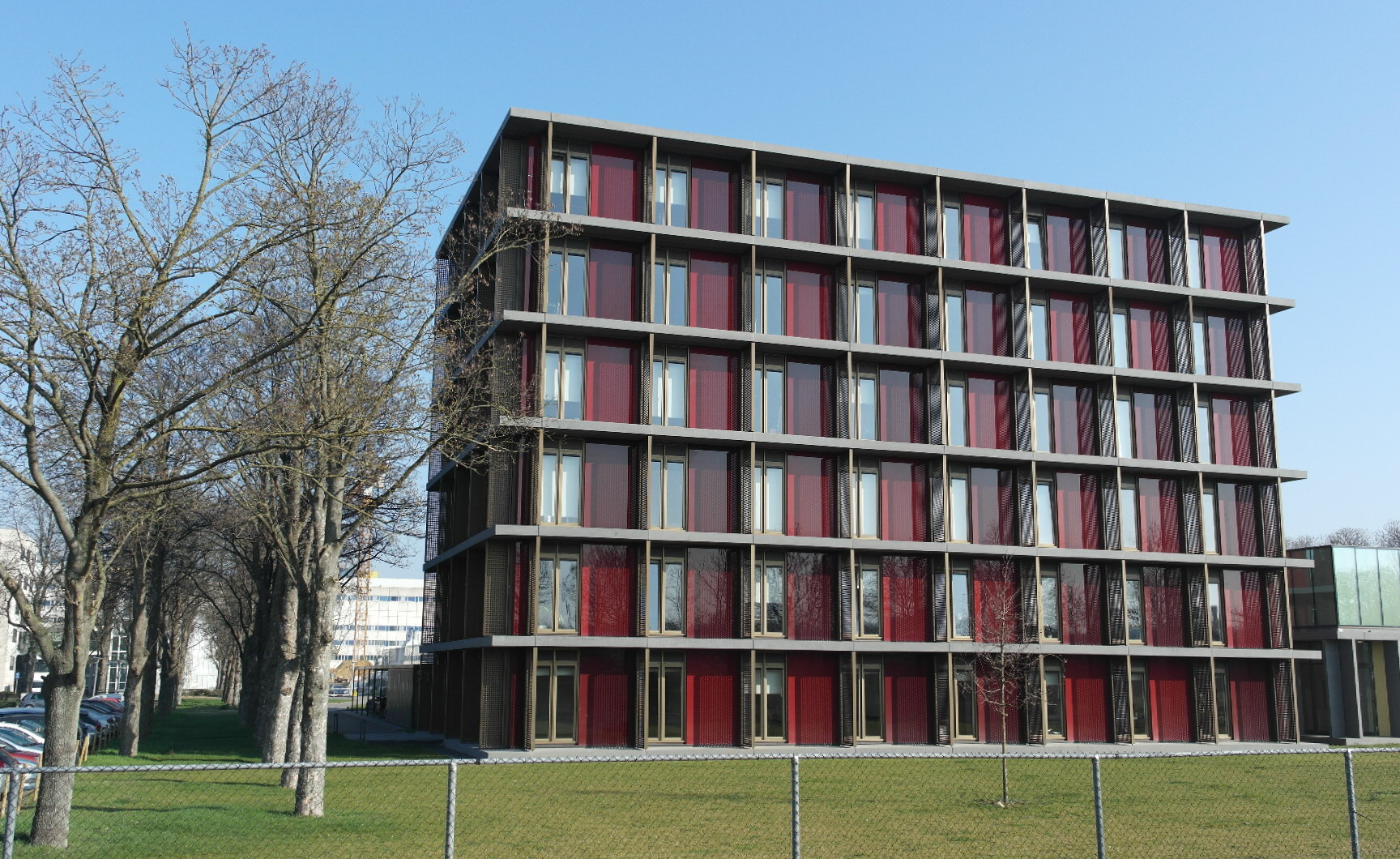
Scannexus, part of Brightlands Maastricht Health Campus in Randwyck

- Research and graduate schools of the school of business and Economics:
  - Graduate School of Business and Economics (GSBE)
  - International Centre for Integrated assessment and Sustainable development (ICIS)
  - METEOR, Maastricht Research School of Economics of Technology and Organization, an umbrella for research schools affiliated with the UM School of Business and Economics:
    - KAANS, monitoring school careers of youngsters in Limburg
    - Limburg Institute of Financial Economics (LIFE)
    - Maastricht Academic Centre for Research in Services (MAXX)
    - Maastricht Accounting and Audit Research Centre (MARC)
    - Network Social Innovation (NSI)
    - Research Centre for Education and the Labour Market (ROA)
- Graduate schools of the Faculty of Law:
  - Maastricht Graduate School of Law (MGSL)
  - Ius Commune
  - School of Human Rights Research
- Graduate schools of the Faculty of Arts and Social Sciences:
  - Graduate school of the Faculty of Arts and Social Sciences (FASOS), linked to WTMC, NIG, Huizinga Institute, OSL, Posthumus Institute, NICA, CERES, NOG, RMeS, and OPG
- Graduate schools of the Faculty of Humanities and Sciences:
  - Maastricht University graduate School of susTainability science (MUST), linked to SENSE
  - Maastricht Graduate School of Governance (MGSoG)

==== Independent research institutes ====
- Maastricht Centre for Human Rights
- Maastricht European Institute for Transnational Law Research (METRO), publishes the Maastricht Journal of European and Comparative Law
- Montesquieu Institute, Centre for European Parliamentary History and Constitutional Development (in The Hague and Maastricht)
- UNU-MERIT, Maastricht Economic and Social Research Institute on Innovation and Technology, part of United Nations University

==== Knowledge transfer, entrepreneurship ====
As elsewhere, ongoing research at Maastricht University is translated into practice, leading to new products to be launched on the market. UM cooperates with businesses and socially relevant organisations through various programmes and institutes, like the Maastricht Centre for Entrepreneurship, Service Science Factory, BioMedbooster, BioPartner Center Maastricht, Contract Research Centre and SME Portal Maastricht University. UM Holding is the corporate venture firm of UM spin-off companies and participations.

Brainport 2020 is the name of a programme that aims at campus development in four locations in the province of Limburg, in cooperation with the local government, business sector and knowledge institutions in the region:

- Brightlands Maastricht Health Campus in Maastricht-Randwyck, specialising in health and wellbeing
- Chemelot Campus in Sittard-Geleen, focusing on chemistry and materials
- Smart Services Hub in Heerlen, focusing on finance, administration and informational services
- Greenport Campus in Venlo, focusing on food and horticulture, with links to logistics and manufacturing

== Student life ==
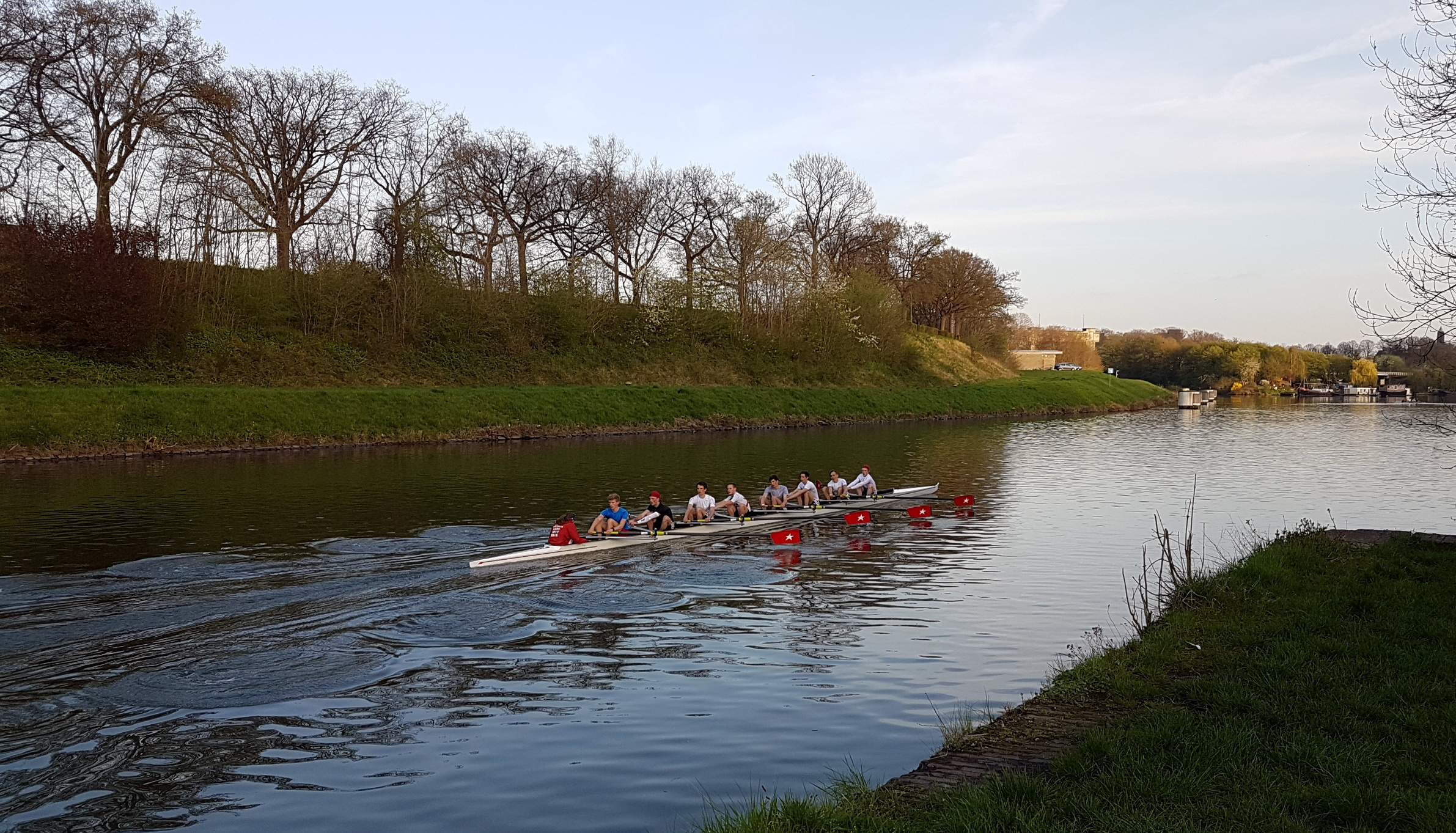
Rowing with MSRV Saurus in Zuid-Willemsvaart

In 2013, nearly 16,000 students studied at Maastricht University, 47% of whom were foreign. Students in Maastricht can affiliate with a number of student associations, international associations or debating societies. They present themselves during the annual INKOM, the general introduction week for new Maastricht students. Furthermore, Maastricht offers several cultural and sports activities in and around the city.

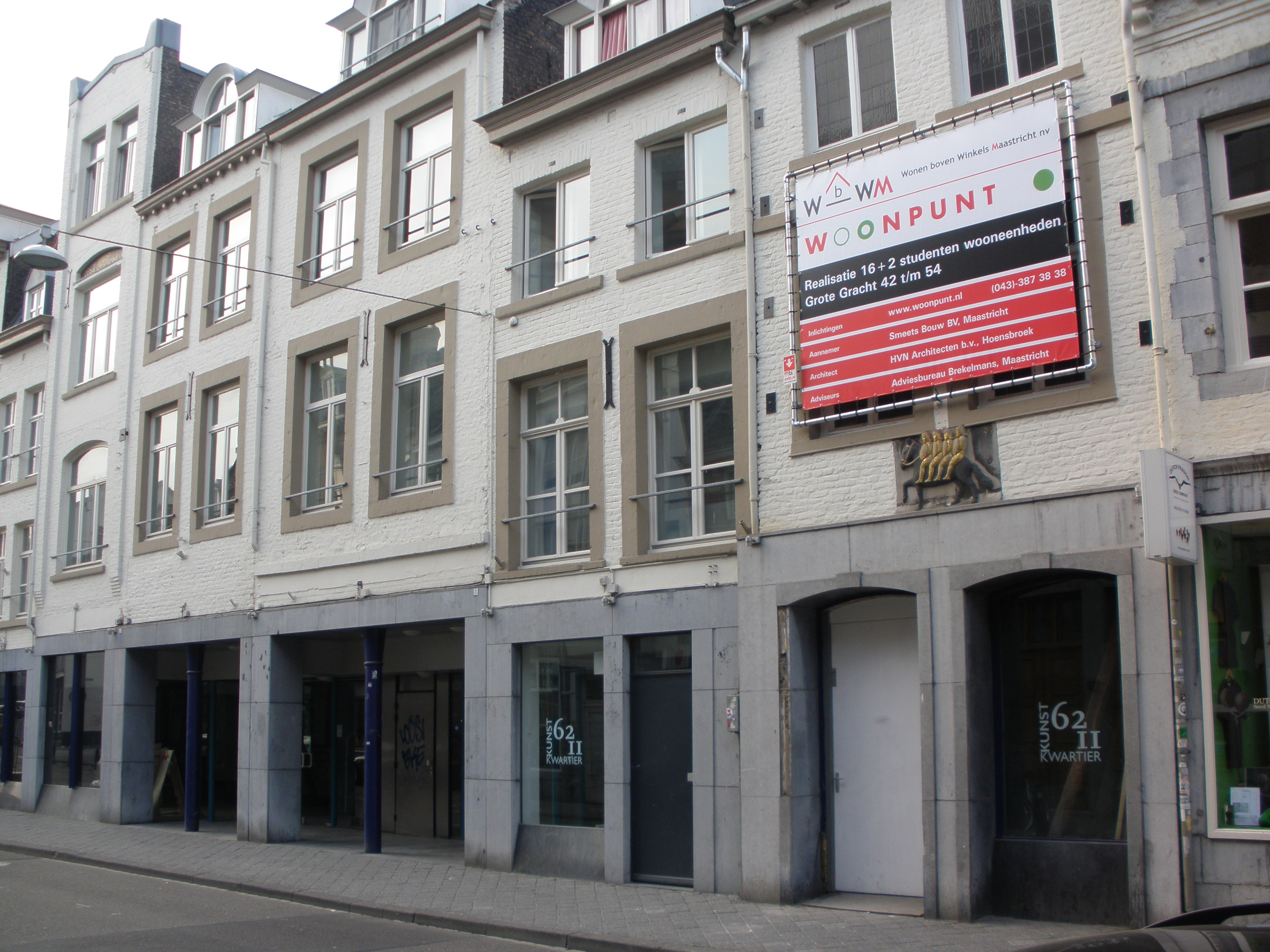
Student housing, Grote Gracht

=== Student housing ===
Like most other Dutch universities, UM itself does not provide regular student housing. However, the university participates in a student housing foundation, offering mediation services to students. About 2,700 rooms and apartments offered through the Maastricht student housing foundation are provided by local housing associations Woonpunt, Servatius and Maasvallei. Some 8,000 other accommodations are provided by private landlords. Most units are located in houses or small apartment complexes across the historic city centre or in its immediate surrounding neighbourhoods. Many foreign exchange students live at the UM Guesthouse in Annadal, which provides short-term housing.

=== Student Service Centre ===
UM's Student Service Centre is located in the former Bonnefanten monastery and offers financial, legal and other forms of advise to students. Part of the Student Service Centre is the Studium Generale cultural programma, offering lectures on a broad range of topics and other cultural activities to members of the university community and the general public.

=== Observant and BreakingMaas ===
The university's independent newspaper, Observant, is published on a weekly basis and distributed throughout the university. It provides news, background articles, columns and educational information in Dutch and English, directed primarily at the university community.

Since 2012 a television programme named BreakingMaas provides news and entertainment for students in English. The programme is available on the local TV broadcaster RTV Maastricht as well as on YouTube and Facebook.

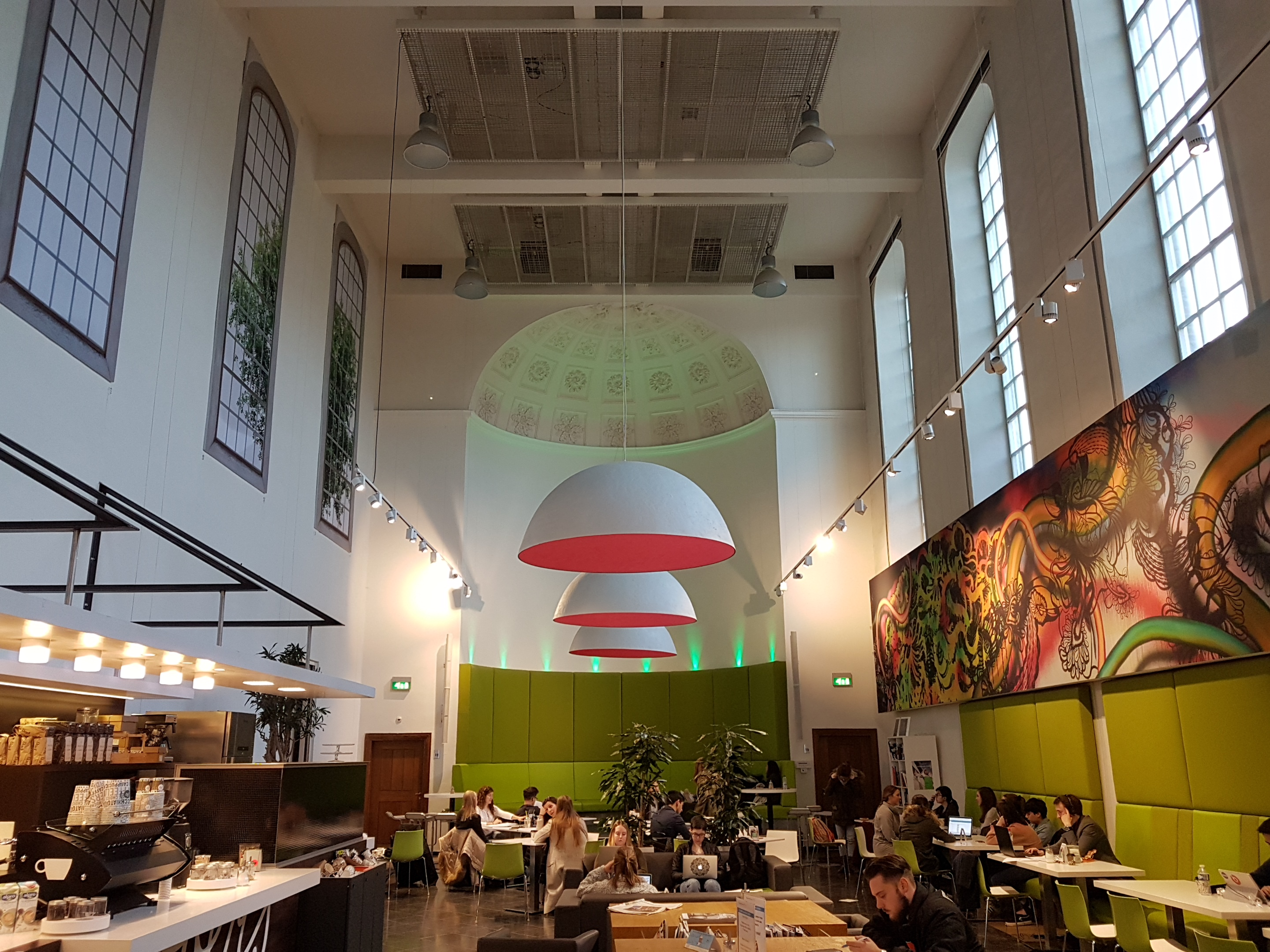
Student Service Center, Ezelmarkt

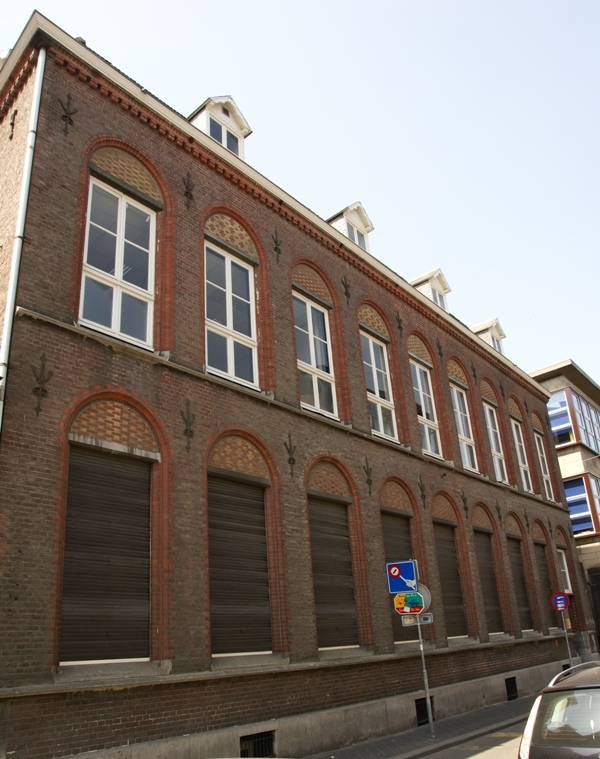
Home of Circumflex, Capucijnenstraat

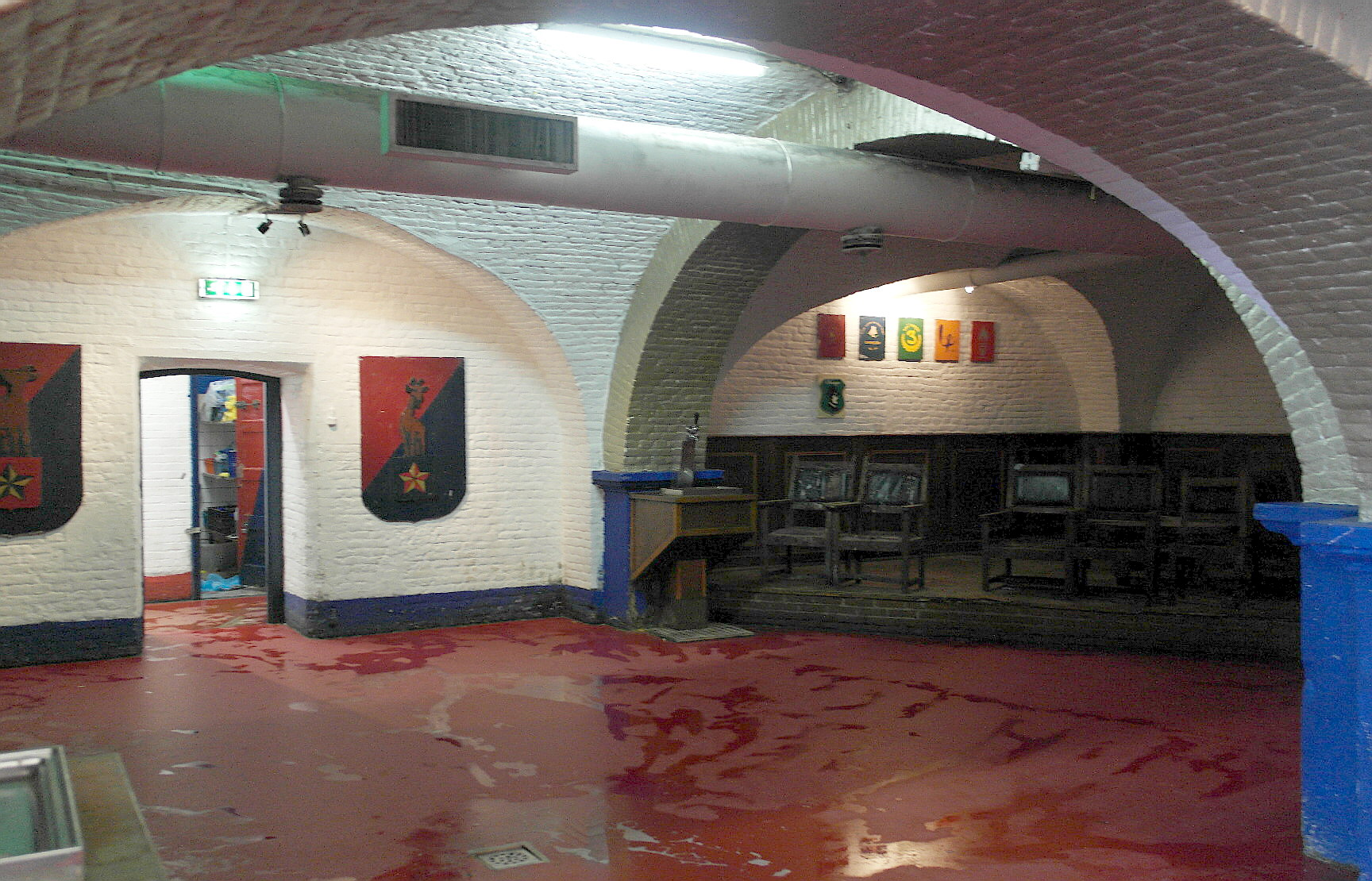
Premises of MSV Tragos in Fort Willem I

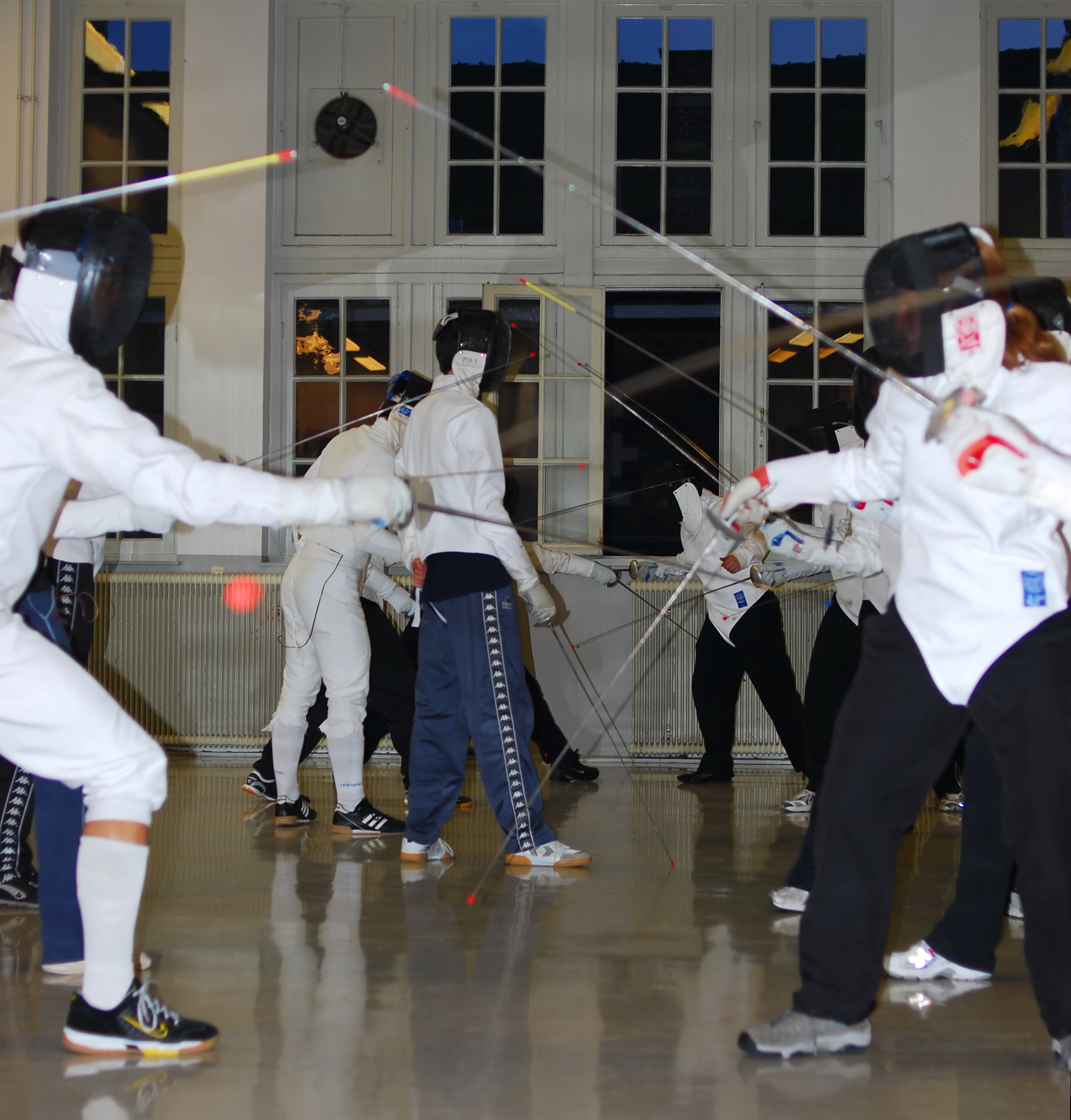
Student fencing club Mas Incontro

== Notable professors ==
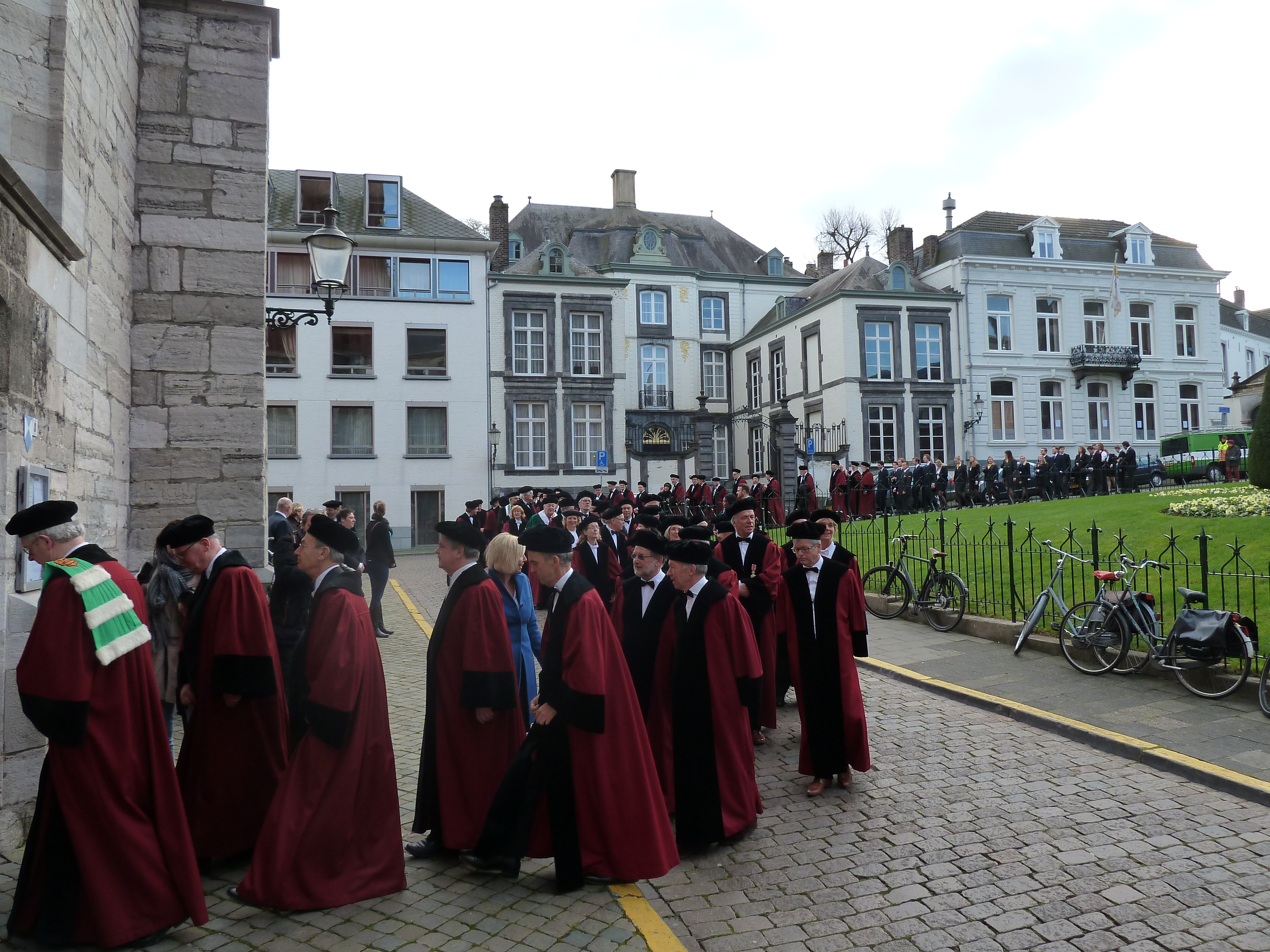
Maastricht faculty on their way to the university's 39th dies natalis in 2015

- Maurits Allessie, professor of physiology, member of the KNAW
- Wiebe Bijker, professor of Technology and Society, member of the Royal Netherlands Academy of Arts and Sciences (KNAW) and together with Trevor Pinch the founder of Social Construction of Technology (SCOT)
- Clemens van Blitterswijk, professor of regenerative medicine
- Theo van Boven, professor Emeritus of International Law, former director of United Nations Commission on Human Rights and UN Special Rapporteur on torture
- Paul Brombacher, professor of Clinical Chemistry in the medical faculty until 1995
- Jan Dietz, professor of Management Information Systems at the Faculty of Economics and Business Administration, developer of the DEMO theory and methodology
- Michel Dumontier, professor of Data Science
- Ferdinand Grapperhaus, professor of European Labour Law, member of the Social-Economic Council, minister of Justice and Security
- Geert Hofstede, emeritus professor of Organizational Anthropology and International Management, founder of Institute for Research on Intercultural Cooperation (IRIC)
- Mark Post, professor of Vascular Physiology. In 2013 he was the first in the world to present a proof of concept for cultured meat.
- Hein Schreuder, professor of Business Economics, Strategy and Organization, later Executive Vice-President Corporate Strategy and Acquisitions at Royal DSM
- Melissa Siegel, professor of migration studies at UNU-MERIT.
- Jan Smits, professor of European Private Law, director of the Maastricht European Private Law Institute, visiting professor of Comparative Legal Studies at the University of Helsinki, member of the KNAW
- Luc Soete, professor of General Economics, director of UNU-MERIT (part of United Nations University), member of the group of key thinkers for the Lisbon Strategy
- Peter Van den Bossche, professor of International Economic Law, head of Department of International & European Law; director, Institute for Globalisation & International Regulation (IGIR), former counselor to the WTO Appellate Body, acting director of WTO Appellate Body Secretariat.
- Cees van der Vleuten, professor of Medical Education, chairman of Department of Educational Development & Research of the faculty of health, Medicine and Life Sciences, scientific director School of Health Professions Education (SHE), honorary professor at the University of Copenhagen, King Saud University and Radboud University, recipient of the Hubbard Award 2005 for most outstanding researcher in medical education.
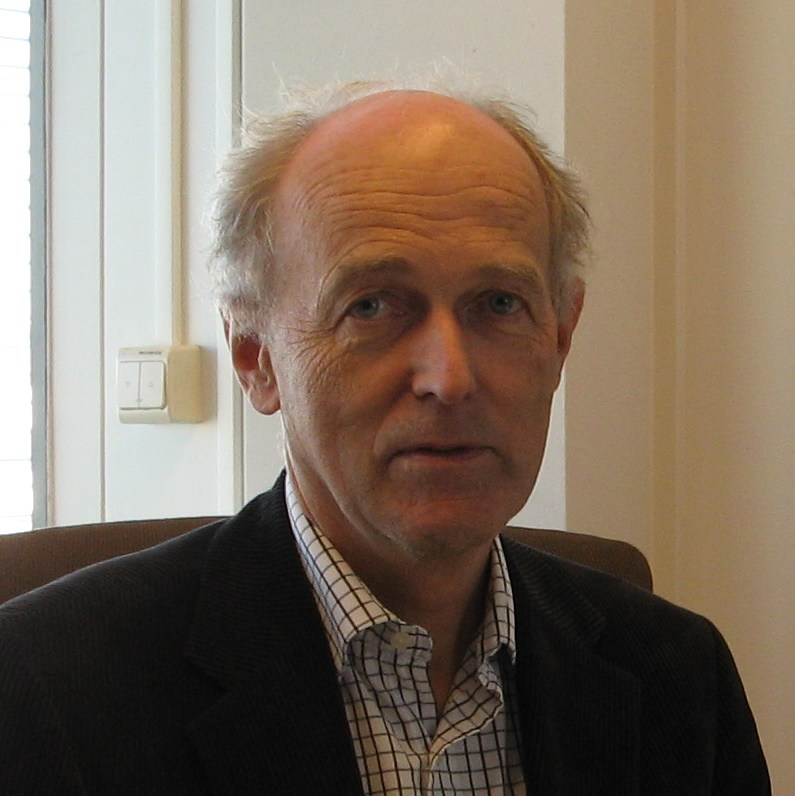
Jan Dietz

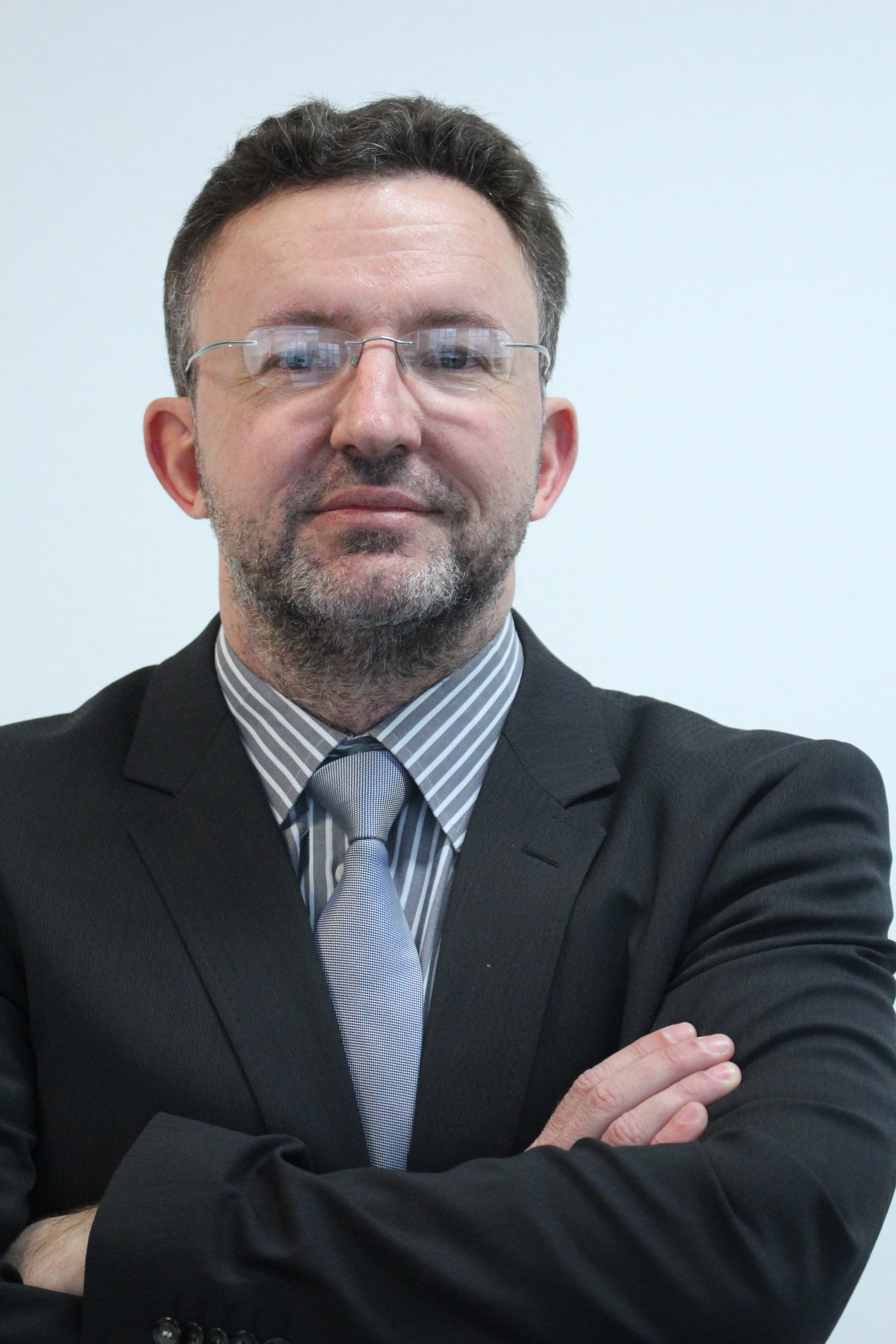
Wim Naudé

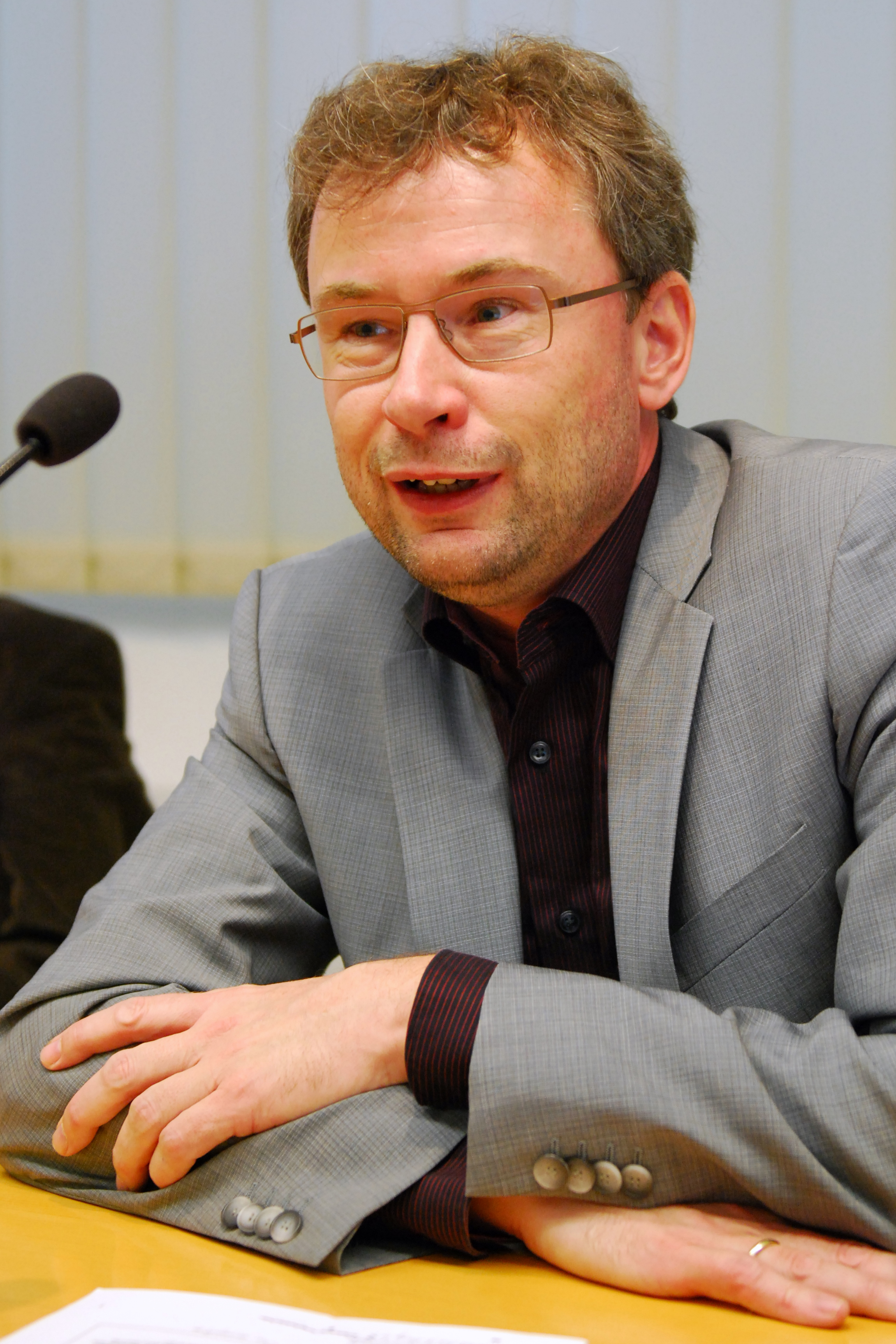
Jan Smits

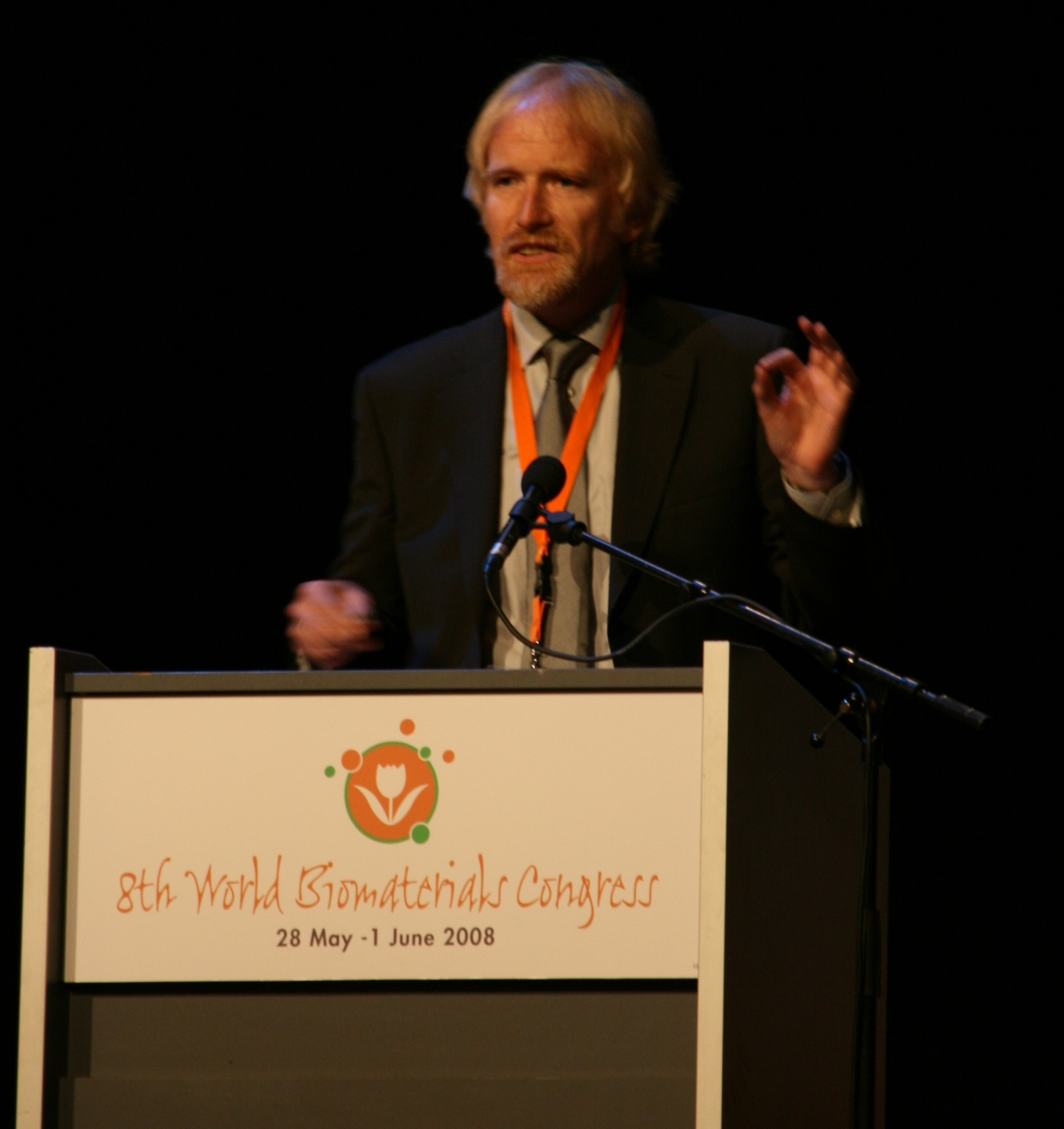
Clemens van Blitterswijk
