= Holy Trinity Academy (Philippines) =

Roman Catholic school in Manila, Philippines

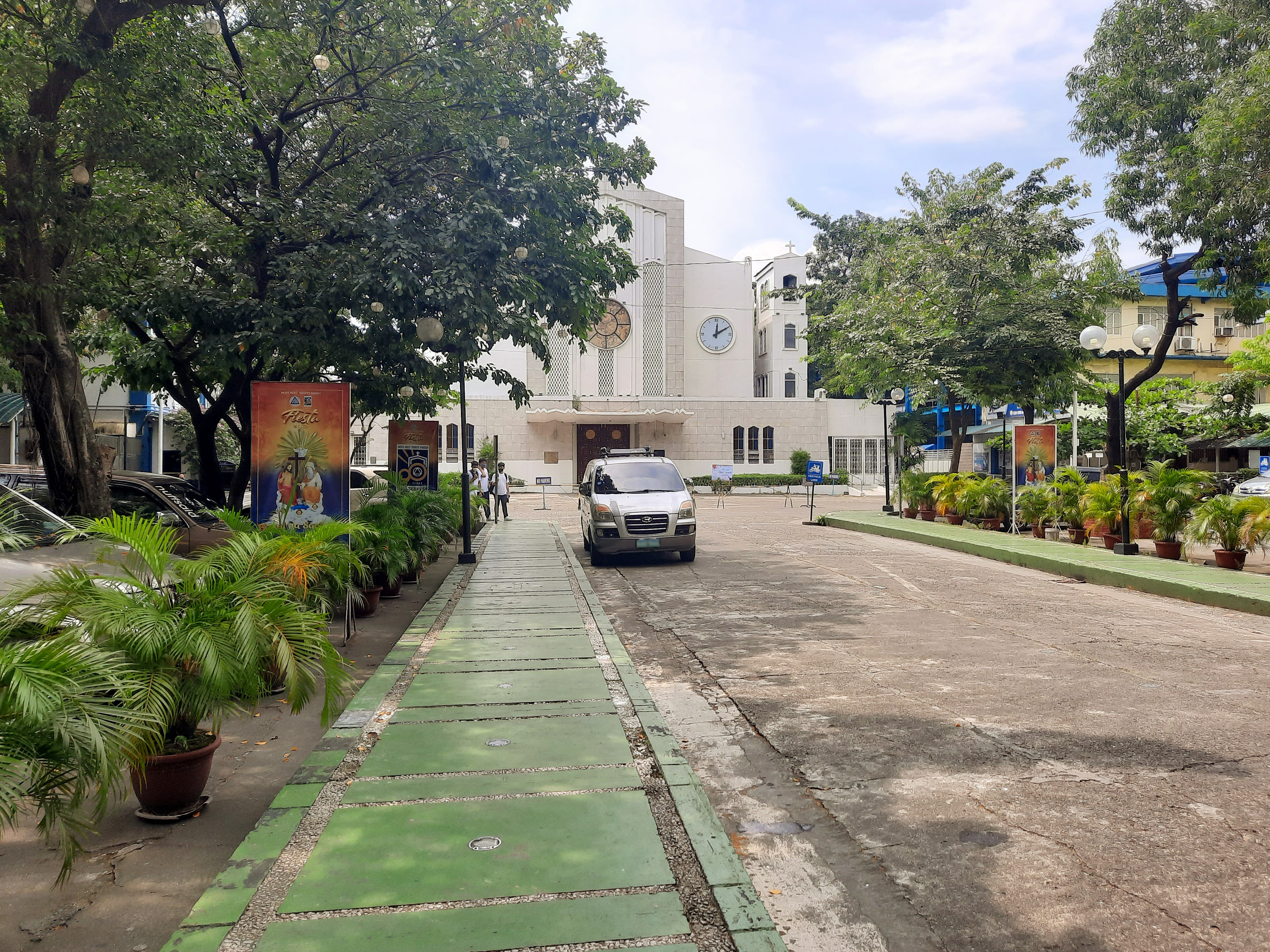
- The school's campus in 2022

Location
- Calabash Road; Sampaloc, Manila, Metro Manila, 1008; Philippines; 14°36′39″N 121°00′10″E

Information
- Other name: Most Holy Trinity Academy
- Type: Private parochial school
- Motto: Love, Unity, Equality
- Religious affiliations: Roman Catholic (Roman Catholic Archdiocese of Manila) (Note: Holy Trinity Academy was affiliated previously with the Franciscan Sisters of the SFIC Congregation and the Daughters of Mary Help of Christians.)
- Patron saint: Blessed Virgin Mary
- Established: June 1947; 79 years ago
- Founder: Rev. Fr. Bernardo Torres
- School code: 406338
- Director: Rev. Fr. Marion C. Munda, Ph.D.
- Principal: Dr. Evelyn B. Tallod, Ed.D.
- Faculty: 52 (2016)
- Grades: K–12
- Gender: Co-educational
- Enrollment: 2,200 (2021–22)
- Language: Tagalog; English
- Campus size: 1.75 hectares (17,500 m^{2})
- Campus type: Suburban
- Color: Royal Blue White Yellow
- Song: "HTA Hymn"
- Accreditation: PAASCU
- Publication: The Triune Voice
- Yearbook: The Trinitarian
- Affiliation: RCAMES
- Website: hta.edu.ph

Holy Trinity Academy (HTA), also referred to as the Most Holy Trinity Academy, or colloquially as Holy, is a private parochial co-educational school in Sampaloc, Manila, Philippines. The school was established in June 1947 by the Catholic priest, Father Bernardo Torres. The school accepted both male and female students, but in separate departments, until it became fully co-educational in 1976.

The school currently maintains a Level 2 accreditation from the Philippine Accrediting Association of Schools, Colleges, and Universities (PAASCU) since its approval in December 2015. The school is part of the Roman Catholic Archdiocese of Manila Educational System (RCAMES), an educational system and a group of Catholic and parochial schools governed by Roman Catholic Archdiocese of Manila, where the school is under the fourth cluster.

Holy Trinity Academy offers the K–12 curriculum program. In the Senior High School Department, the school offers five academic tracks, which prepares students for college and their chosen undergraduate program. In the school year 2019–2020, the school served a population of around 3,000 enrollees annually in its preparatory, elementary, and high school departments.

== History ==
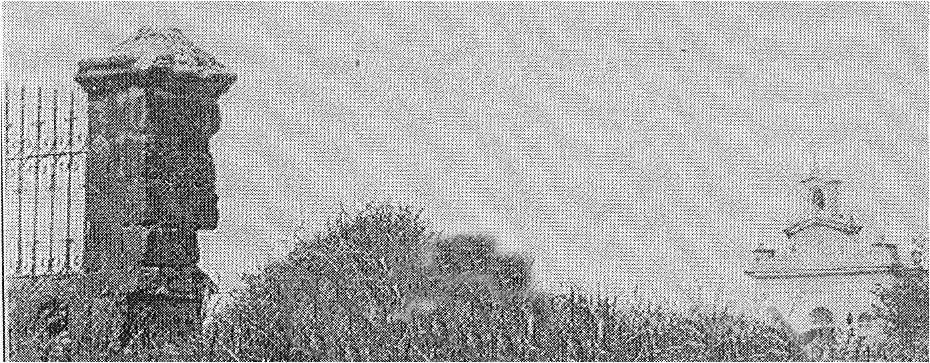
The façade of Cementerio de Balic-Balic, taken in c. 1899

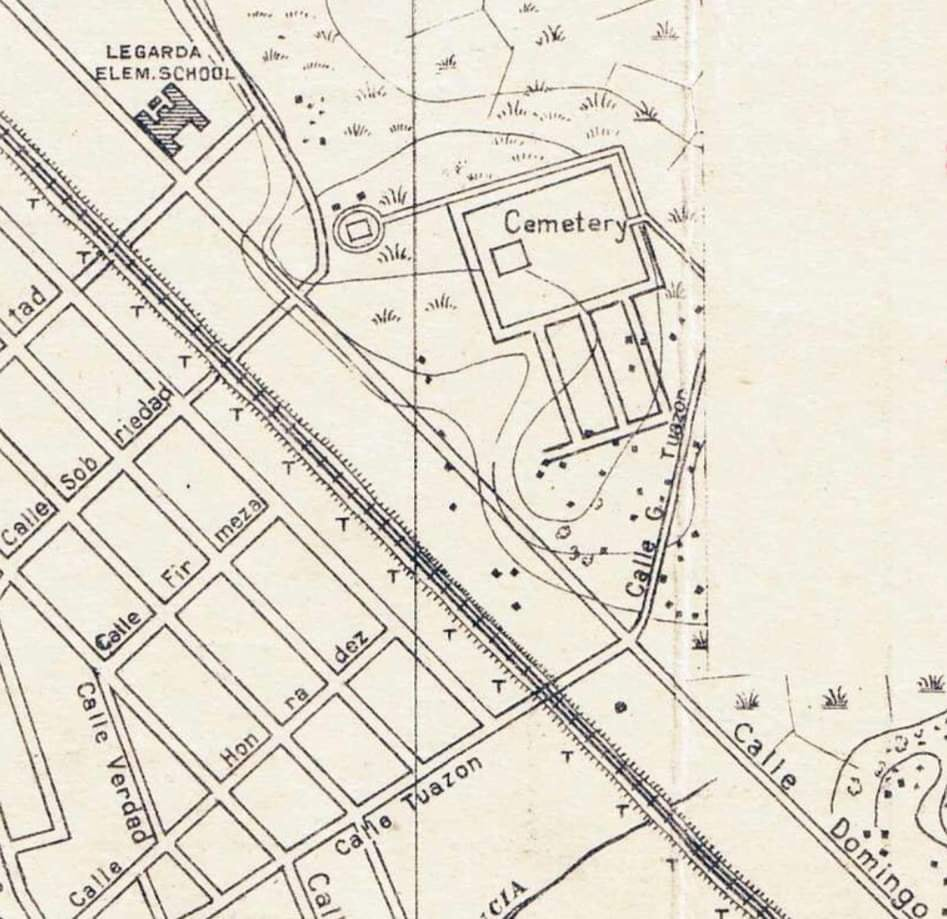
The old map of the Balic-Balic area, before the establishment of Holy Trinity Academy, where is marked as a "cemetery"

Before the establishment of the school in 1947, the site was the Balic-Balic Cemetery, created in 1884 and closed in 1913.

Holy Trinity Academy was established in June 1947; in which, its foundation was ascribed to Rev. Fr. Bernardo Torres, the incumbent parish priest of Iglesia de Santissima Trinidad at the time (now Most Holy Trinity Parish). The Franciscan Sisters was also credited with the foundation of the school in 1947. Two Franciscan Sisters of the SFIC congregation were the first few people to work at the school as teachers for two years.

In 1958, the management of the school was turned over to the Daughters of Mary Help of Christians (later known as the Salesian Sisters of Don Bosco) by Rufino Santos, the incumbent Cardinal of Archdiocese of Manila at the time. The Salesian Sisters set up co-educational classes from Kindergarten to Grade 4, and separate sections for females in Grades 5–6. They stayed in the school for 30 years, managing Kindergarten to Grade 6 classes, and later the separate HTA Girl's Department in 1964.

During the directorship of Msgr. Isidro L. Jose in 1962, he had a plan of accommodating all children of school age. In 1964, the HTA Boy's Department was set up, under the supervision of the lay administrators. In the school year 1972–1973, the HTA Boy's Department started kindergarten classes.

In June 2021 a groundbreaking ceremony for a new ten-storey building was held.

During the COVID-19 pandemic that started in 2020, Holy Trinity Academy was part of Manila's 24/7 vaccination service which started on August 9, 2021, administering 2,000 doses of COVID-19 vaccines to people in the A1 to A5 priority groups.

== Academics ==
=== Accreditation ===
Holy Trinity Academy currently holds a Level 2 accreditation from the Philippine Accrediting Association of Schools, Colleges, and Universities (PAASCU).

=== Academic tracks ===
Holy Trinity Academy offers 5 academic tracks that prepares students for college and their preferred undergraduate program in the Senior High School Department for 2 years.

- Accountancy, Business and Management (ABM)
- Science, Technology, Engineering, and Mathematics (STEM)
- Humanities and Social Sciences (HUMSS)
- Technical-Vocational and Livelihood (TVL)
  - Information and Communications Technology (ICT)
  - Home Economics and Livelihood Education (HELE)

== Campus ==
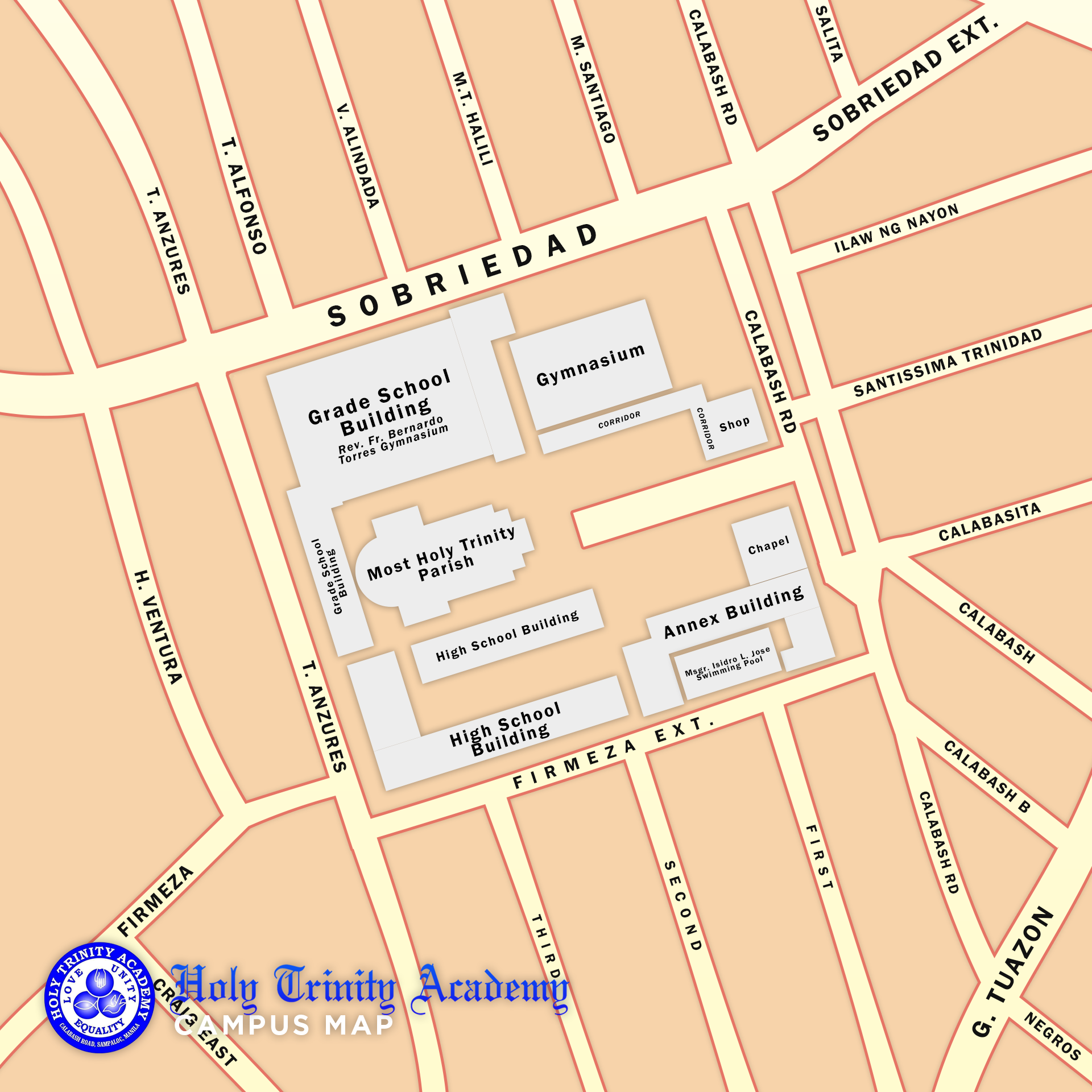
Campus map

The campus of Holy Trinity Academy consists of estimated 1.75 hectares (17,500 m²) of land in Sampaloc, Manila, bounded by Sobriedad Street to the northwest, Calabash Road to the northeast, Firmeza Street to the southeast, and T. Anzures to the southwest. It was previously used as a cemetery. The campus is a kilometer (0.62 mi) away from Manila's neighboring city, Quezon City.

The campus has four major buildings for teaching and one for religious gatherings. The Grade School Building is the biggest building in the campus, followed by the High School Building, the Annex Building, the Most Holy Trinity Parish, and the HTA Gymnasium.

The overall worth of HTA facilities and buildings was never disclosed publicly; however, it was revealed that one of its major facilities, the HTA Gymnasium, cost ₱8.8 million pesos at the time of construction in 2001.

Most Holy Trinity Parish is the oldest structure inside the campus, built in 1890 as a funerary chapel and rebuilt in 1925.

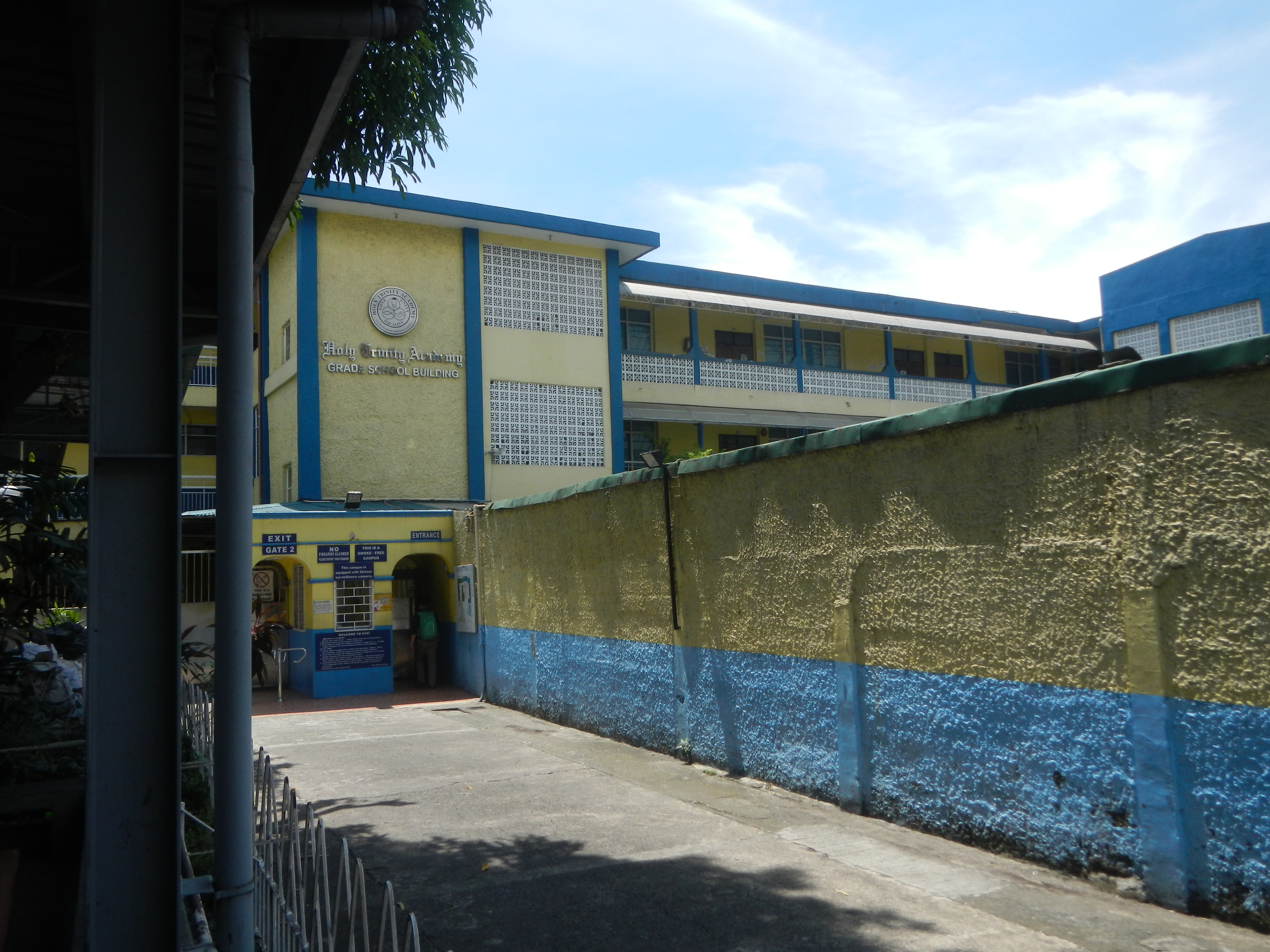
Grade School Building seen in 2016, before the construction of Rev. Fr. Bernardo Torres Gymnasium

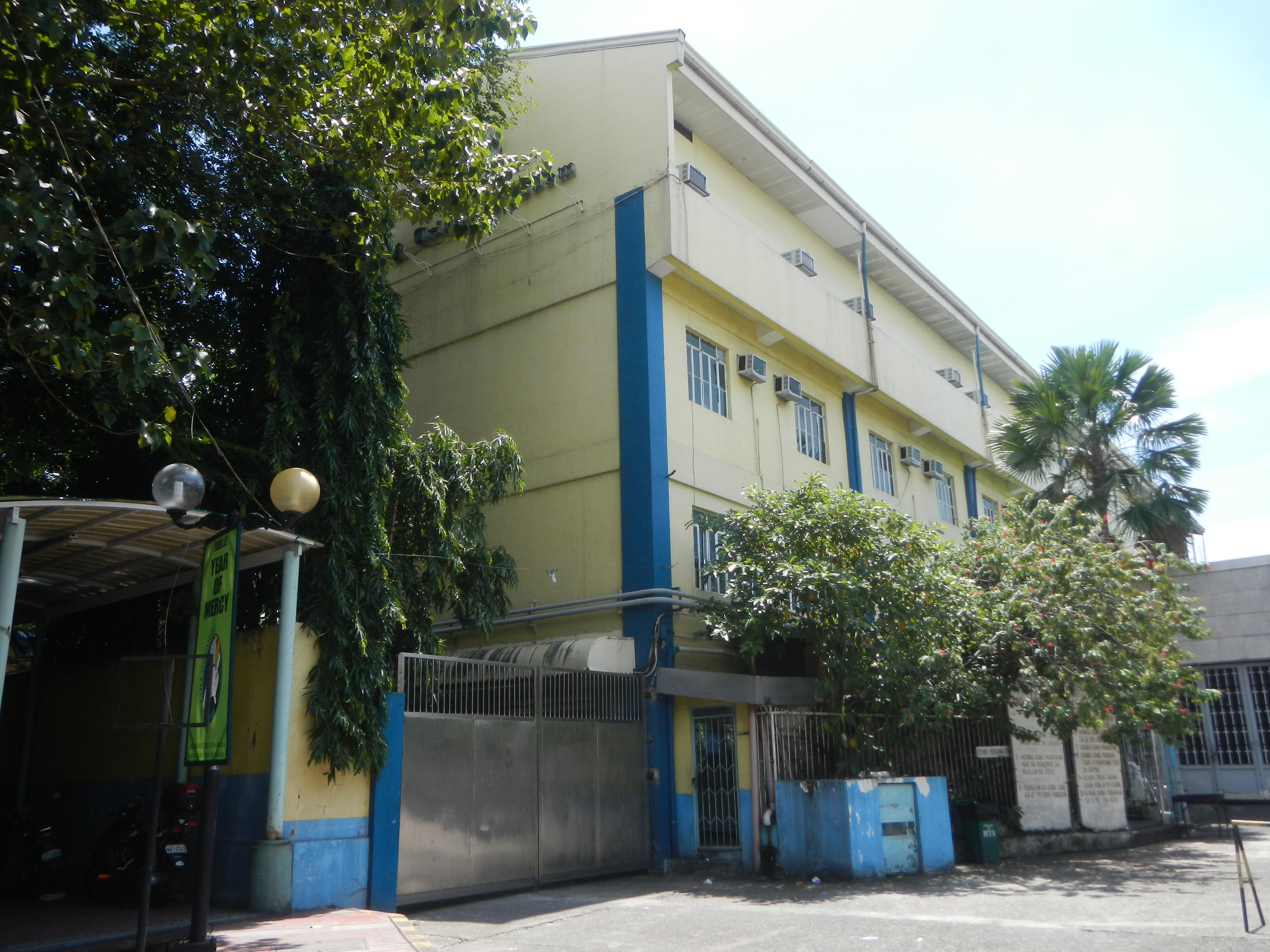
High School Building, seen in 2016

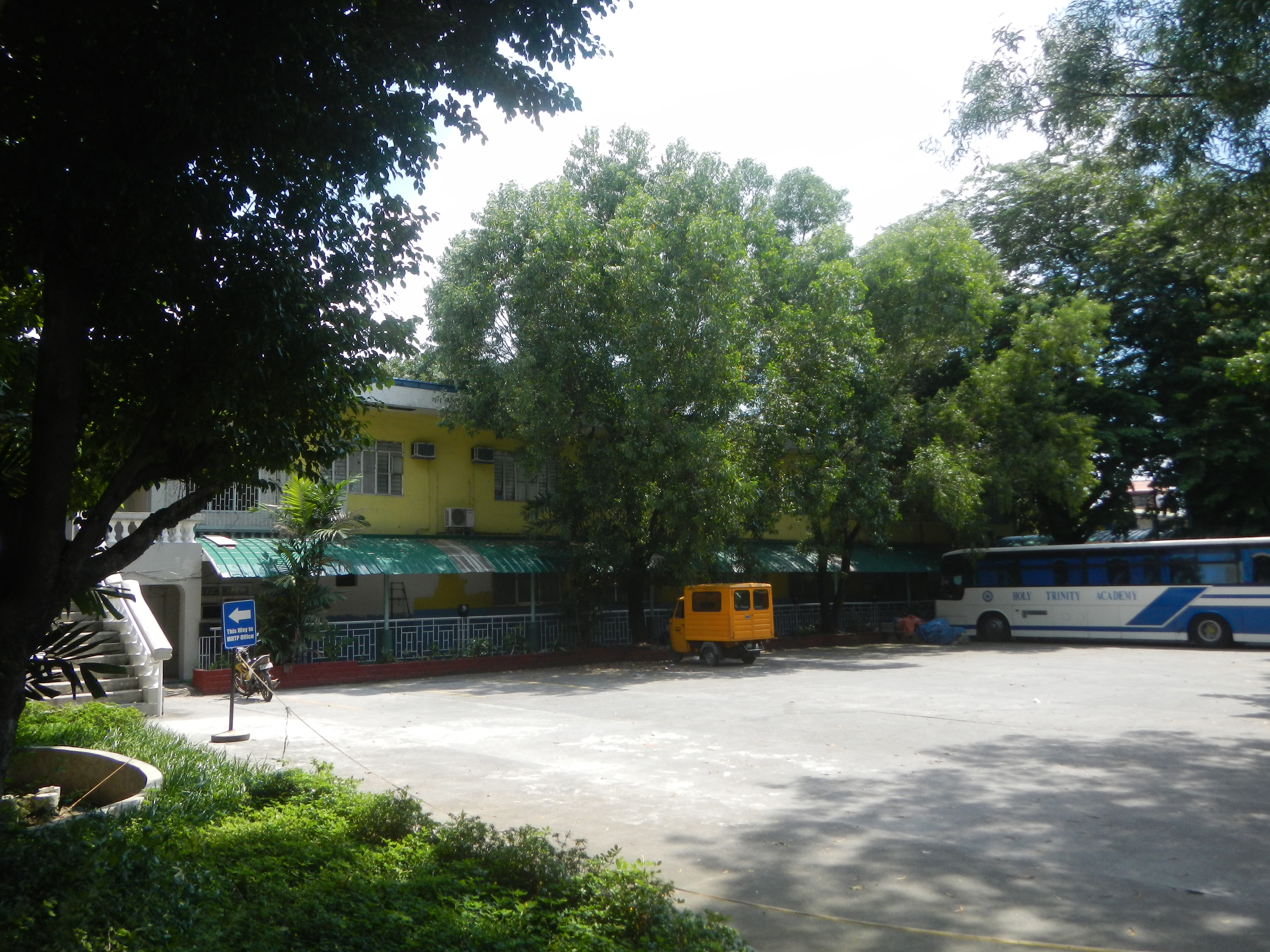
Annex Building, seen in 2016

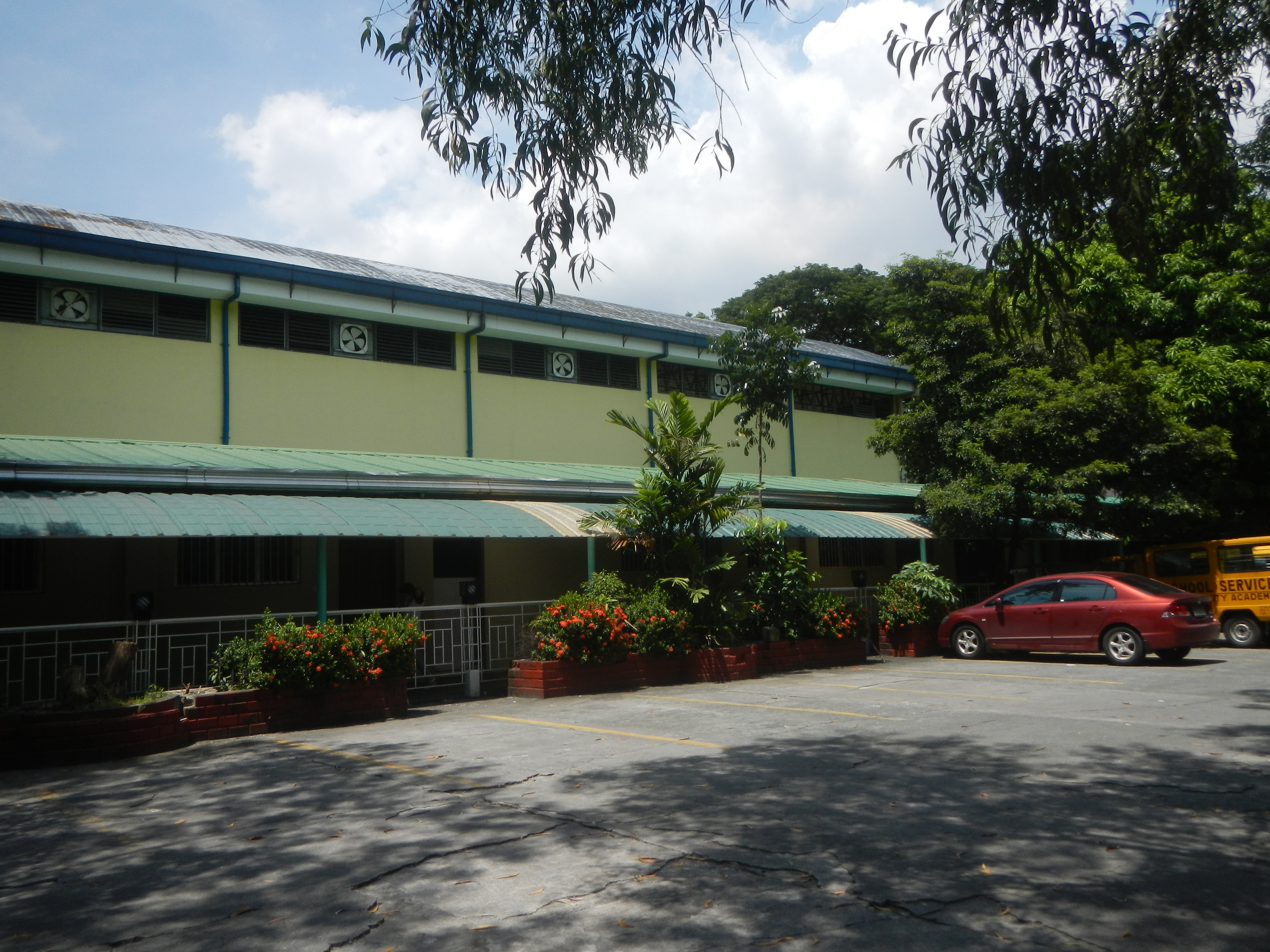
HTA Gymnasium, seen in 2016, was unused and demolished in 2025 for way for the 10 Story Proposed Building

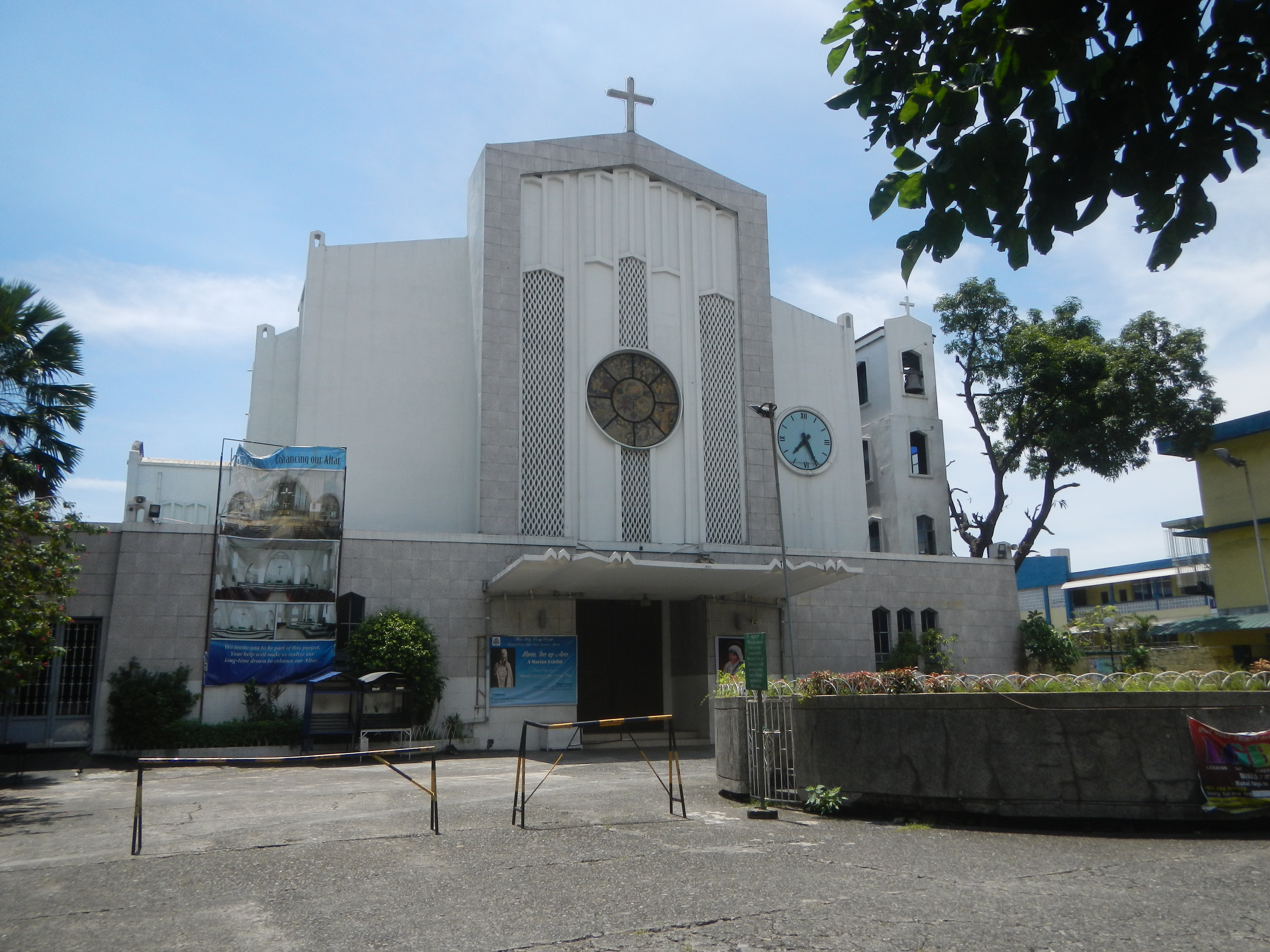
The Most Holy Trinity Parish, seen in 2016

== Administration ==
Holy Trinity Academy School Directors
Name	Years served
Rev. Fr. Bernardo Torres	1947–1955
Fr. Felix Perez	1955–1955
Fr. Francisco Avendano	1955–1957
Fr. Felix Ignacio	1957–1962
Msgr. Isidro L. Jose	1962–1983
Msgr. Danilo Pascual	1983–1988
Msgr. Cesar Pagulayan	1988–1991
Msgr. Manuel Gabriel	1991–1998
Rev. Fr. Enrico Martin F. Adoviso	1998–2014
Rev. Fr Marion C. Munda, Ph.D.	2014–2025
Rv. Fr. Paul Enrique H. Gungon IV	2025–present
References

Holy Trinity Academy is governed by 6-person Board of Trustees, as well as a 22-person school administrators, 12 of them being academic and institutional coordinators.

The current school director is Rv. Fr. Paul Enrique H. Gungon IV, the eleventh to hold the title. The current assistant school director is Rev. Fr. Leo Angelo S. Ignacio, Ed.D.

== Culture and traditions ==
=== HTA Hymn ===
The Holy Trinity Academy Hymn (often shortened to as HTA Hymn, also occasionally referred to as the Glorious Song) is the school's hymn.

HTA Hymn Lyrics: Cirilo H. Bautista Hymn: Emy Munji

Let us sing the glorious song
Of truth that brings eternal light
And wave proudly our banner high
Of purest blue and white.

With love as our inspiration
And God our guide by day and night
Our noble aim we will achieve
For truth will give us might.

Holy Trinity Academy
In you, wisdom we will always find
The truth with which you
Light the world
Will always light our mind.

== Notable people ==
People associated with the school either as students, faculty members, or administrators are known as "Trinitarians" or colloquially "HTAcians."

HTA alumni includes Lexi Gonzales, an actress, singer, and dancer, known for being hailed as the First Princess on the seventh season of the Philippine reality talent competition, StarStruck. She was previously part of ABS-CBN's talent management arm of Star Magic, where she has been part of several TV show, that includes: Magpahanggang Wakas, Pusong Ligaw, Maalaala Mo Kaya, Ipaglaban Mo and The Good Son as either an extra or an uncredited guest cast. Gonzales now appears in the Philippine variety show, All-Out Sundays of GMA Network as a recurring cast.

Filipino inventor, Kyxz Mendiola, who also attended Holy Trinity Academy, notable as a founding member of a former Filipino hip-hop group, Philippine All Stars, a filmmaker, and for inventing and developing an ultralight aircraft, Koncepto Milenya, which broke a world record for longest flight by hoverboard in 2021, surpassing the Guinness World record set by Franky Zapata who flew a jet-powered hoverboard across a distance of 2.25 km in 2016.
