= List of Running Man Philippines episodes (2024) =

- Season 2
- No. of episodes: 35 (as of September 8, 2024)

Release
- Original network: GMA Network
- Original release: May 11 – September 8, 2024

Season chronology
- ← Previous; Season 1 Next → Season 3

The second season of the Philippine variety show, Running Man Philippines, was aired in 2024. The show airs on GMA Network as part of their Best Time Ever! lineup. Currently, it has 9 chapters for a total of 22 episodes. Each chapter consists of 2 to 4 episodes.

== Episodes ==
Running Man Philippines 2024 episodes (033 - 0xx)
| # | Chap. | Episode # (Airdate) | Title | Guest(s) | Landmark | Teams | Mission | Results |
|---|---|---|---|---|---|---|---|---|
| 33 | 2/01 | EP 1 (May 11, 2024) | The New Runner Test | Miguel Tanfelix; New Running Man PH Member | Incheon International Airport (Jung-gu, Incheon, South Korea) | No Teams | Fake-Con Secret Mission; Miguel must complete 3 Secret Mission to Join the RM Team. If Miguel fails, he'll be sent back to Manila, PH | Miguel succeeds Miguel Joins the RMPH |
| 34 | 2/01 | EP 2 (May 12, 2024) | The New Runner Test | Miguel Tanfelix; New Running Man PH Member | Suwon Sampung Pool (Suwon, Gyeonggi Province, South Korea) | No Teams | RMPH First Winter Mission; Mission: Play the Beach games and show your teamwork with you new member Punishment: Runners must remove one of their clothing every time they fail. | Runners wins Runner's received their clothes back |
| 35 | 2/02 | EP 3 (May 18, 2024) | Winter RM Olympics | Alessandra De Rossi; Michael Sager; Mark Striegl | Trout Festival Site (Pyeongchang, Gangwon Special Self-Governing Province) | Team Batang Kanal (BK); Buboy (Leader), Miguel, Glaiza, Lexi, Mark Team Kolokoy (KK); Kokoy (Leader), Mikael, Michael, Angel, Alex | Win the RMPH Winter Olympics | Buboy wins Buboy receives a 3.75g Pure Gold Medal |
| 36 | 2/02 | EP 4 (May 19, 2024) | Winter RM Olympics | Alessandra De Rossi; Michael Sager; Mark Striegl | Trout Festival Site (Pyeongchang, Gangwon Special Self-Governing Province) | Team Batang Kanal (BK); Buboy (Leader), Miguel, Glaiza, Lexi, Mark Team Kolokoy (KK); Kokoy (Leader), Mikael, Michael, Angel, Alex | Win the RMPH Winter Olympics | Buboy wins Buboy receives a 3.75g Pure Gold Medal |
| 37 | 2/02 | EP 5 (May 25, 2024) | Winter RM Olympics | Alessandra De Rossi; Michael Sager; Mark Striegl | Yongpyong Resort (Pyeongchang, Gangwon Special Self-Governing Province) | Team Batang Kanal (BK); Buboy (Leader), Miguel, Glaiza, Lexi, Mark Team Kolokoy (KK); Kokoy (Leader), Mikael, Michael, Angel, Alex | Win the RMPH Winter Olympics | Buboy wins Buboy receives a 3.75g Pure Gold Medal |
| 38 | 2/02 | EP 6 (May 26, 2024) | Winter RM Olympics | Alessandra De Rossi; Michael Sager; Mark Striegl | Yongpyong Resort (Pyeongchang, Gangwon Special Self-Governing Province) | Team Batang Kanal (BK); Buboy (Leader), Miguel, Glaiza, Lexi, Mark Team Kolokoy (KK); Kokoy (Leader), Mikael, Michael, Angel, Alex | Win the RMPH Winter Olympics | Buboy wins Buboy receives a 3.75g Pure Gold Medal |
| 39 | 2/03 | EP 7 (June 01, 2024) | School Race | Josh Cullen of SB19; Shaira Diaz | Saldun School (Hongcheon, Gangwon Special Self-Governing Province) | Team Kap (Miguel, Mikael, Shaira) Team Josh (Josh, Lexi, Kokoy) Team Boss G (Buboy, Angel, Glaiza) | Team Missions Teams must compete in the missions related to extra-curricular activities | Team Kap wins |
| 40 | 2/03 | EP 8 (June 02, 2024) | School Race | Josh Cullen of SB19; Shaira Diaz | Saldun School (Hongcheon, Gangwon Special Self-Governing Province) | Team Kap (Miguel, Mikael, Shaira) Team Josh (Josh, Lexi, Kokoy) Team Boss G (Buboy, Angel, Glaiza) | Team Missions Teams must compete in the missions related to extra-curricular activities | Team Kap wins |
| 41 | 2/04 | EP 09 (June 08, 2024) | Haunted School Race | Josh Cullen of SB19; Shaira Diaz | Saldun School (Hongcheon, Gangwon Special Self-Governing Province) | No Teams | Find My Nametag; Find your nametag to escape the Haunted School | Miguel, Mikael, Shaira, Josh, Lexi, Kokoy, Angel, Glaiza wins |
| 42 | 2/04 | EP 10 (June 09, 2024) | Haunted School Race | Josh Cullen of SB19; Shaira Diaz | Saldun School (Hongcheon, Gangwon Special Self-Governing Province) | No Teams | Find My Nametag; Find your nametag to escape the Haunted School | Miguel, Mikael, Shaira, Josh, Lexi, Kokoy, Angel, Glaiza wins |
| 43 | 2/05 | EP 11 (June 15, 2024) | Runners vs. Goliath | Eric Tai | Legoland Korea Resort (Jungdo Island, Chuncheon, Gangwon Province) | Team Miguel; Miguel, Kokoy, Mikael, Buboy Team Eruption; Eric, Glaiza, Lexi, Angel | Team Missions; Teams must compete in the Missions | Runners wins Members receives a Gift from Legoland Korea |
| 44 | 2/05 | EP 12 (June 16, 2024) | Runners vs. Goliath | Eric Tai | Legoland Korea Resort (Jungdo Island, Chuncheon, Gangwon Province) | Runners vs. Goliath Nametag Elimination Runners (Miguel, Kokoy, Mikael, Buboy, Glaiza, Lexi, Angel) Goliath; Eric | Runners' Mission; Find all 7 items Goliath's Mission; Eliminate all 7 Runners | Eric wins Eric receives a Gift from Legoland Korea |
| 45 | 2/06 | EP 13 (June 22, 2024) | K-Entertainment Experience | No Guest/s | Goyang Awesome Town Training Center (Goyang, South Korea) | No Teams | Mission; Enhance the Runner's Entertainment Skill by Completing various games from Korean Variety Shows | Runners wins Runners received ₩350,000 (₱14,900) as their cash prize |
| 46 | 2/06 | EP 14 (June 23, 2024) | K-Entertainment Experience | No Guest/s | Goyang Awesome Town Training Center (Goyang, South Korea) | No Teams | Mission; Enhance the Runner's Entertainment Skill by Completing various games from Korean Variety Shows | Runners wins Runners received ₩350,000 (₱14,900) as their cash prize |
| 47 | 2/06 | EP 15 (June 29, 2024) | K-Entertainment Experience | No Guest/s | Goyang Awesome Town Training Center (Goyang, South Korea) | No Teams | Mission; Enhance the Runner's Entertainment Skill by Completing various games from Korean Variety Shows | Runners wins Runners received ₩350,000 (₱14,900) as their cash prize |
| 48 | 2/06 | EP 16 (June 30, 2024) | K-Entertainment Experience | No Guest/s | Goyang Awesome Town Training Center (Goyang, South Korea) | No Teams | Mission; Enhance the Runner's Entertainment Skill by Completing various games from Korean Variety Shows | Runners wins Runners received ₩350,000 (₱14,900) as their cash prize |
| 49 | 2/07 | EP 17 (July 06, 2024) | Global Miss Runningwoman | Bianca Umali | Goyang, South Korea | No Teams | King's / Runners' Mission; Eliminate all the Runners by Removing their Crowns. Last Runningwoman Wins. | Miguel wins Miguel Snatches the King's Crown from Haha to win and was crowned as Ms. Global Miss Runningwoman |
| 50 | 2/07 | EP 18 (July 07, 2024) | Global Miss Runningwoman | Bianca Umali; Haha of Running Man Korea | Goyang, South Korea | No Teams | King's / Runners' Mission; Eliminate all the Runners by Removing their Crowns. Last Runningwoman Wins. | Miguel wins Miguel Snatches the King's Crown from Haha to win and was crowned as Ms. Global Miss Runningwoman |
| 51 | 2/08 | EP 19 (July 13, 2024) | Gang War | Herlene Budol; Archie Alemania | Iksan, South Korea | No Teams | Prison Escape; Runners must find the 4-digit password of the lock from each runners' nametags to exit the prison. | Miguel wins |
| 52 | 2/08 | EP 20 (July 14, 2024) | Gang War | Herlene Budol; Archie Alemania | Iksan, South Korea | No Teams | Prison Escape; Runners must find the 4-digit password of the lock from each runners' nametags to exit the prison. | Miguel wins |
| 52 | 2/09 | EP 20 (July 14, 2024) | Prison Break Race | Herlene Budol; Archie Alemania | Iksan Prison Set (Iksan, South Korea) | No Teams | Prison Escape; Runners must find the 4-digit password of the lock from each runners' nametags to exit the prison. | Miguel wins |
| 53 | 2/09 | EP 21 (July 20, 2024) | Prison Break Race | Herlene Budol; Archie Alemania | Iksan Prison Set (Iksan, South Korea) | No Teams | Prison Escape; Runners must find the 4-digit password of the lock from each runners' nametags to exit the prison. | Miguel wins |
| 54 | 2/09 | EP 22 (July 21, 2024) | Prison Break Race | Herlene Budol; Archie Alemania | Iksan Prison Set (Iksan, South Korea) | No Teams | Prison Escape; Runners must find the 4-digit password of the lock from each runners' nametags to exit the prison. | Miguel wins |
| 55 | 2/10 | EP 23 (July 27, 2024) | Temple Stay Race | Paul Salas | Beomnyunsa (Buddhist Temple of the Jogye Order) Yongin-si, Gyeonggi Province, South Korea | Team Lexi; Lexi, Buboy, Mikael, Miguel Team Glaiza; Glaiza, Angel, Paul, Kokoy | Candle Relay; The Team Leader holds the candle while carried on the back of their team mates. They have to fulfill the requirement of each four stations without the candle burning out; and hit the Gong at the end. | Team Lexi wins |
| 56 | 2/10 | EP 24 (July 28, 2024) | Temple Stay Race | Paul Salas | Beomnyunsa (Buddhist Temple of the Jogye Order) Yongin-si, Gyeonggi Province, South Korea | Team Lexi; Lexi, Buboy, Mikael, Miguel Team Glaiza; Glaiza, Angel, Paul, Kokoy | Candle Relay; The Team Leader holds the candle while carried on the back of their team mates. They have to fulfill the requirement of each four stations without the candle burning out; and hit the Gong at the end. | Team Lexi wins |
| 57 | 2/11 | EP 25 (August 03, 2024) | Seoulmates Race | Nancy of Momoland | SBS Headquarters; Mok-dong, Seoul, South Korea | Team BoKap; Glaiza, Mikael Team GeKoy; Angel, Kokoy Team MigCy; Miguel, Nancy Team BuLe; Buboy, Lexi | Couples' War | Team BuLe winsRThe number of their nametags is based on their ranking |
| 58 | 2/11 | EP 26 (August 04, 2024) | Seoulmates Race | Nancy of Momoland | SBS Headquarters; Mok-dong, Seoul, South Korea | Team BoKap; Glaiza, Mikael Team GeKoy; Angel, Kokoy Team MigCy; Miguel, Nancy Team BuLe; Buboy, Lexi | Couples' War | Team BuLe winsRThe number of their nametags is based on their ranking |
| 58 | 2/11 | EP 26 (August 04, 2024) | Seoulmates Race | Nancy of Momoland | Hongdae Shopping Street; Mapo District, Seoul, South Korea | Team BoKap; Glaiza, Mikael Team GeKoy; Angel, Kokoy Team MigCy; Miguel, Nancy Team BuLe; Buboy, Lexi | Couples' War | Team BuLe winsRThe number of their nametags is based on their ranking |
| 59 | 2/11 | EP 27 (August 10, 2024) | Seoulmates Race | Nancy of Momoland | Hongdae Shopping Street; Mapo District, Seoul, South Korea | Team BoKap; Glaiza, Mikael Team GeKoy; Angel, Kokoy Team MigCy; Miguel, Nancy Team BuLe; Buboy, Lexi | Couples' War | Team BuLe winsRThe number of their nametags is based on their ranking |
| 59 | 2/11 | EP 27 (August 10, 2024) | Seoulmates Race | Nancy of Momoland | SBS Headquarters; Mok-dong, Seoul, South Korea | Team BoKap; Glaiza, Mikael Team GeKoy; Angel, Kokoy Team MigCy; Miguel, Nancy Team BuLe; Buboy, Lexi | Couples' War | Team BuLe winsRThe number of their nametags is based on their ranking |
| 60 | 2/11 | EP 28 (August 11, 2024) | Seoulmates Race | Nancy of Momoland | SBS Headquarters; Mok-dong, Seoul, South Korea | Team BoKap; Glaiza, Mikael Team GeKoy; Angel, Kokoy Team MigCy; Miguel, Nancy Team BuLe; Buboy, Lexi | Couples' War | Team BuLe winsRThe number of their nametags is based on their ranking |
| 60 | 2/11 | EP 28 (August 11, 2024) | Seoulmates Race | Elisia and Gehlee of UNIS | SBS Headquarters; Mok-dong, Seoul, South Korea | Team BoKap; Glaiza, Mikael Team GeKoy; Angel, Kokoy Team MigCy; Miguel, Nancy Team BuLe; Buboy, Lexi | Couples' War | Team BuLe winsRThe number of their nametags is based on their ranking |
| 61 | 2/12 | EP 29 (August 17, 2024) | Dragon's Luck Race | Rochelle Pangilinan | TBA | Team Rochelle Rochelle, Lexi, Kokoy, Buboy | The Unlucky Two The two teams will play 3 "Gantihan Games". After each game, the winning team will get 9 slots in the roulette and put a name of the member of the other team. After the 3 games, the roulette will be spun and will decide who the 2 unlucky runners are. | The Unlucky Two: Mikael & Miguel |
| 62 | 2/12 | EP 30 (August 18, 2024) | Dragon's Luck Race | Rochelle Pangilinan | TBA | Team Rochelle Rochelle, Lexi, Kokoy, Buboy | The Unlucky Two The two teams will play 3 "Gantihan Games". After each game, the winning team will get 9 slots in the roulette and put a name of the member of the other team. After the 3 games, the roulette will be spun and will decide who the 2 unlucky runners are. | The Unlucky Two: Mikael & Miguel |
| 63 | 2/12 | EP 31 (August 24, 2024) | Dragon's Luck Race | Rochelle Pangilinan | TBA | Team Glaiza Glaiza, Angel, Mikael, Miguel | The Unlucky Two The two teams will play 3 "Gantihan Games". After each game, the winning team will get 9 slots in the roulette and put a name of the member of the other team. After the 3 games, the roulette will be spun and will decide who the 2 unlucky runners are. | The Unlucky Two: Mikael & Miguel |
| 64 | 2/12 | EP 32 (August 25, 2024) | Dragon's Luck Race | Rochelle Pangilinan | TBA | Team Glaiza Glaiza, Angel, Mikael, Miguel | The Unlucky Two The two teams will play 3 "Gantihan Games". After each game, the winning team will get 9 slots in the roulette and put a name of the member of the other team. After the 3 games, the roulette will be spun and will decide who the 2 unlucky runners are. | The Unlucky Two: Mikael & Miguel |
| 65 | 2/13 | EP 33 (August 31, 2024) | Anti-Homesick Race | Sandara Park of 2NE1 | TBA | No Teams | Basagan Itlog Race Runners must destroy the eggs of other runners to win the race. Runners must protect their eggs no matter how many eggs they are holding because once the other runners have run out of eggs, they are out. Runners with the most remaining eggs at the end win. | Glaiza Wins |
| 66 | 2/13 | EP 34 (September 1, 2024) | Anti-Homesick Race | Sandara Park of 2NE1 | TBA | No Teams | Basagan Itlog Race Runners must destroy the eggs of other runners to win the race. Runners must protect their eggs no matter how many eggs they are holding because once the other runners have run out of eggs, they are out. Runners with the most remaining eggs at the end win. | Glaiza Wins |
| 67 | 2/14 | EP 35 (September 7, 2024) | Runners In Borderland | Ruru Madrid (Special Participation) | Cheorwon Experience Army Life Youth Center Cheorwon, South Korea | TBA | Battle Of The Hills Each runners have their nametags based on their ranking. Glaiza, Kokoy, Lexi, Miguel, and Ruru have 3 nametags. Angel and Buboy have 2 nametags and Mikael have only 1. Each runner is have only 1 base, per base have 1 balloon is equivalent to 1 life. Runners must protect their base to avoid their balloon is popped. Rip the nametag of their opponent to decrease their life. Runner with their remaining nametags at the end is hailed as the season 2 ultimate runner. | Kokoy Wins Kokoy eliminates Buboy to become the Ultimate Runner of Season 2. |
| 68 | 2/14 | EP 36 (September 8, 2024) | Runners In Borderland | Ruru Madrid (Special Participation) | Cheorwon Experience Army Life Youth Center Cheorwon, South Korea | TBA | Battle Of The Hills Each runners have their nametags based on their ranking. Glaiza, Kokoy, Lexi, Miguel, and Ruru have 3 nametags. Angel and Buboy have 2 nametags and Mikael have only 1. Each runner is have only 1 base, per base have 1 balloon is equivalent to 1 life. Runners must protect their base to avoid their balloon is popped. Rip the nametag of their opponent to decrease their life. Runner with their remaining nametags at the end is hailed as the season 2 ultimate runner. | Kokoy Wins Kokoy eliminates Buboy to become the Ultimate Runner of Season 2. |

== Viewership ==
Average TV viewership ratings (in Percentage)
| Ep. | Original broadcast date | Aggregated Ratings |
| Ep. | Original broadcast date | Nutam People Ratings |
|---|---|---|
| 01 | May 11, 2024 | 11.2% (1st) |
| 02 | May 12, 2024 | 8.9% (2nd) |
| 03 | May 18, 2024 | 10.4% (1st) |
| 04 | May 19, 2024 | 10.2% (2nd) |
| 05 | May 25, 2024 | 12.1% (1st) |
| 06 | May 26, 2024 | 10.6% (2nd) |
| 07 | June 1, 2024 | 11.0% (1st) |
| 08 | June 2, 2024 | 10.5% (2nd) |
| 09 | June 8, 2024 | 10.9% (1st) |
| 10 | June 9, 2024 | 10.4% (2nd) |
| 11 | June 15, 2024 | 11.4% (1st) |
| 12 | June 16, 2024 | 9.7% (2nd) |
| 13 | June 22, 2024 | 12.2% (1st) |
| 14 | June 23, 2024 | 10.3% (2nd) |
| 15 | June 29, 2024 | — |
| 16 | June 30, 2024 | — |
| 17 | July 6, 2024 | 12.9% (1st) |
| 18 | July 7, 2024 | 11.6% (2nd) |
| 19 | July 13, 2024 | 12.7% (1st) |
| 20 | July 14, 2024 | 11.6% (2nd) |
| 21 | July 20, 2024 | 12.2% (1st) |
| 22 | July 21, 2024 | 13.3% (2nd) |
| 23 | July 27, 2024 | — |
| 24 | July 28, 2024 | — |
| 25 | August 3, 2024 | 12.2% (1st) |
| 26 | August 4, 2024 | 11.5% (2nd) |
| 27 | August 10, 2024 | 12.0% (1st) |
| 28 | August 11, 2024 | 10.8% (2nd) |
| 29 | August 17, 2024 | 11.4% (1st) |
| 30 | August 18, 2024 | 11.1% (2nd) |
| 31 | August 24, 2024 | — |
| 32 | August 25, 2024 | — |
| 33 | August 31, 2024 | 11.3% (1st) |
| 34 | September 1, 2024 | 11.3% (2nd) |
| 35 | September 7, 2024 | — |
| 36 | September 8, 2024 | — |
In the table above, the blue numbers represent the lowest ratings and the red numbers represent the highest ratings.
Source: NUTAM Peoples Ratings (Nielsen Phils. TAM) Based on Preliminary / Overnight Data
