= List of Running Man Philippines episodes (2022) =

- Season 1
- No. of episodes: 32

Release
- Original network: GMA Network
- Original release: September 3 – December 18, 2022

Season chronology
- ← Previous - Next → Season 2

The first season of the Philippine variety show Running Man Philippines was first aired in 2022. The show aired on GMA Network as part of their Comedy Weekend lineup. It has 12 chapters for a total of 32 episodes (episode 3 was divided into Chapter 1 and Chapter 2). Each chapter consists of 2 to 3 episodes.

== Episodes ==
Running Man Philippines 2024 episodes (033 - 0xx)
#	Chap.	Episode # (Airdate)	Title	Guest(s)	Landmark	Teams	Mission	Results
1	1/01	EP 1 (September 3, 2022)	Operation: Pinoy Running Man	No guests	Hwaseong Fortress (Suwon, Gyeonggi Province, South Korea)	No teams	Be a Running Man PH Agent; Win the Name-Tag Elimination	Ruru Wins; Ruru receive a Golden R-Necklace
2	1/01	EP 2 (September 4, 2022)	Operation: Pinoy Running Man	No guests	Suwon Sampung Pool (Suwon, Gyeonggi Province, South Korea)	No teams	Be a Running Man PH Agent; Win the Name-Tag Elimination	Ruru Wins; Ruru receive a Golden R-Necklace
3	1/01	EP 3 (September 10, 2022)	Operation: Pinoy Running Man	No guests	Suwon Youth Hostel (Suwon, Gyeonggi Province, South Korea)	No teams	Be a Running Man PH Agent; Win the Name-Tag Elimination	Ruru Wins; Ruru receive a Golden R-Necklace
3	1/02	EP 3 (September 10, 2022)	Catch the Thief	Boobay	Namsangol Hanok Village (Jung-gu, Seoul, South Korea)	Chasing Team (Ruru, Buboy, Angel, Kokoy, Glaiza, Lexi) Thief (Boobay); Spy (Mikael)	Catch the Thief and Retrieve the stolen R-Necklace	Chasing Team Wins; Mikael and Boobay received a water balloon penalty
4	1/02	EP 4 (September 11, 2022)	Catch the Thief	Boobay	SBS Headquarters (Mok-dong, Seoul, South Korea)	Chasing Team (Ruru, Buboy, Angel, Kokoy, Glaiza, Lexi) Thief (Boobay); Spy (Mikael)	Catch the Thief and Retrieve the stolen R-Necklace	Chasing Team Wins; Mikael and Boobay received a water balloon penalty
5	1/02	EP 5 (September 17, 2022)	Catch the Thief	Boobay	SBS Headquarters (Mok-dong, Seoul, South Korea)	Chasing Team (Ruru, Buboy, Angel, Kokoy, Glaiza, Lexi) Thief (Boobay); Spy (Mikael)	Catch the Thief and Retrieve the stolen R-Necklace	Chasing Team Wins; Mikael and Boobay received a water balloon penalty
6	1/03	EP 6 (September 18, 2022)	Wedding Race	Rhian Ramos; Michelle Dee; Rafael Rosell	Yongin Agricultural Theme Park (Gyeonggi-do, South Korea)	Mikael & Rhian; Ruru & Michelle; Rafael & Glaiza; Buboy & Lexi; Kokoy & Angel	Collect all (3) Wedding Items before the Final Race.	Kokoy & Angel Wins; Kokoy and Angel get "Married"
7	1/03	EP 7 (September 24, 2022)	Wedding Race	Rhian Ramos; Michelle Dee; Rafael Rosell	Yongin Agricultural Theme Park (Gyeonggi-do, South Korea)	Mikael & Rhian; Ruru & Michelle; Rafael & Glaiza; Buboy & Lexi; Kokoy & Angel	Collect all (3) Wedding Items before the Final Race.	Kokoy & Angel Wins; Kokoy and Angel get "Married"
8	1/03	EP 8 (September 25, 2022)	Wedding Race	Rhian Ramos; Michelle Dee; Rafael Rosell	Yongin Agricultural Theme Park (Gyeonggi-do, South Korea)	Mikael & Rhian; Ruru & Michelle; Rafael & Glaiza; Buboy & Lexi; Kokoy & Angel	Collect all (3) Wedding Items before the Final Race.	Kokoy & Angel Wins; Kokoy and Angel get "Married"
9	1/04	EP 9 (October 1, 2022)	Find Your Age Race	Epy Quizon	Incheon, South Korea	Wheels of Time / Cuckoo Clock (No Teams) Incheon Race; Team A - Blue (Epi, Glaiza, Mikael, Buboy); Team B - Pink (Kokoy, Lexi, Angel, Ruru)	The first team to return to their correct age wins	Blue Team Wins; Buboy Eliminated Ruru to win the Race
10	1/04	EP 10 (October 2, 2022)	Find Your Age Race	Epy Quizon	Incheon, South Korea	Wheels of Time / Cuckoo Clock (No Teams) Incheon Race; Team A - Blue (Epi, Glaiza, Mikael, Buboy); Team B - Pink (Kokoy, Lexi, Angel, Ruru)	The first team to return to their correct age wins	Blue Team Wins; Buboy Eliminated Ruru to win the Race
11	1/04	EP 11 (October 8, 2022)	Find Your Age Race	Epy Quizon	Incheon, South Korea	Wheels of Time / Cuckoo Clock (No Teams) Incheon Race; Team A - Blue (Epi, Glaiza, Mikael, Buboy); Team B - Pink (Kokoy, Lexi, Angel, Ruru)	The first team to return to their correct age wins	Blue Team Wins; Buboy Eliminated Ruru to win the Race
12	1/05	EP 12 (October 9, 2022)	Territory Race	Pekto; Valeen Montenegro	Sunshine Studio (Seoul, South Korea)	Train Survival (No Teams) Territory Race; Green Team (Pekto, Glaiza, Angel); Blue Team (Buboy, Kokoy, Lexi); Red Team (Mikael, Ruru, Valeen)	Complete the Map of the Philippines by doing Missions	Red Team Wins; Ruru and Mikael Eliminated Angel and Kokoy to win the Race
13	1/05	EP 13 (October 15, 2022)	Territory Race	Pekto; Valeen Montenegro	Sunshine Studio (Seoul, South Korea)	Train Survival (No Teams) Territory Race; Green Team (Pekto, Glaiza, Angel); Blue Team (Buboy, Kokoy, Lexi); Red Team (Mikael, Ruru, Valeen)	Complete the Map of the Philippines by doing Missions	Red Team Wins; Ruru and Mikael Eliminated Angel and Kokoy to win the Race
14	1/05	EP 14 (October 16, 2022)	Territory Race	Pekto; Valeen Montenegro	Sunshine Studio (Seoul, South Korea)	Train Survival (No Teams) Territory Race; Green Team (Pekto, Glaiza, Angel); Blue Team (Buboy, Kokoy, Lexi); Red Team (Mikael, Ruru, Valeen)	Complete the Map of the Philippines by doing Missions	Red Team Wins; Ruru and Mikael Eliminated Angel and Kokoy to win the Race
15	1/06	EP 15 (October 22, 2022)	Mukbang Bingo	Megan Young; Andre Paras	Mokpo, South Korea	Red Team (Glaiza, Megan, Ruru); Blue Team (Buboy, Mikael, Kokoy); White Team (Lexi, Angel, Andre)	Mukbang Bingo; First Team to Complete the Bingo Wins	White Team Wins; White Team Simultaneously Eliminated Mikael and Kokoy to win the Race
16	1/06	EP 16 (October 23, 2022)	Mukbang Bingo	Megan Young; Andre Paras	Mokpo, South Korea	Red Team (Glaiza, Megan, Ruru); Blue Team (Buboy, Mikael, Kokoy); White Team (Lexi, Angel, Andre)	Mukbang Bingo; First Team to Complete the Bingo Wins	White Team Wins; White Team Simultaneously Eliminated Mikael and Kokoy to win the Race
17	1/06	EP 17 (October 29, 2022)	Mukbang Bingo	Megan Young; Andre Paras	Mokpo, South Korea	Red Team (Glaiza, Megan, Ruru); Blue Team (Buboy, Mikael, Kokoy); White Team (Lexi, Angel, Andre)	Mukbang Bingo; First Team to Complete the Bingo Wins	White Team Wins; White Team Simultaneously Eliminated Mikael and Kokoy to win the Race
18	1/07	EP 18 (October 30, 2022)	Exit Race	Kyline Alcantara	Hwaseong Sports Town (Gyeonggi-do, South Korea)	Chasing Team (Ruru, Buboy, Kokoy, Kyline, Lexi, Mikael) Spies (Glaiza and Angel)	Chasing Team; Catch the Spy or Exit the Building to Win; Spies; Finish the Hidden Missions or Exit the Building to Win	Ruru, Lexi, Kokoy, Buboy and Spies Wins; Kyline and Mikael received a flour punishment for failing to exit the building
19	1/07	EP 19 (November 5, 2022)	Exit Race	Kyline Alcantara	Hwaseong Sports Town (Gyeonggi-do, South Korea)	Chasing Team (Ruru, Buboy, Kokoy, Kyline, Lexi, Mikael) Spies (Glaiza and Angel)	Chasing Team; Catch the Spy or Exit the Building to Win; Spies; Finish the Hidden Missions or Exit the Building to Win	Ruru, Lexi, Kokoy, Buboy and Spies Wins; Kyline and Mikael received a flour punishment for failing to exit the building
20	1/07	EP 20 (November 6, 2022)	Exit Race	Kyline Alcantara	Hwaseong Sports Town (Gyeonggi-do, South Korea)	Chasing Team (Ruru, Buboy, Kokoy, Kyline, Lexi, Mikael) Spies (Glaiza and Angel)	Chasing Team; Catch the Spy or Exit the Building to Win; Spies; Finish the Hidden Missions or Exit the Building to Win	Ruru, Lexi, Kokoy, Buboy and Spies Wins; Kyline and Mikael received a flour punishment for failing to exit the building
21	1/08	EP 21 (November 12, 2022)	Pocket Money Race	Rocco Nacino; Empoy Marquez	Wave Park (Si-Heung, South Korea)	Red Team (Lexi, Ruru, Empoy); Blue Team (Glaiza, Mikael, Rocco); Green Team (Angel, Buboy, Kokoy)	Get the Most Pocket Money to Win	Rocco Wins; Rocco used a Revive Ticket to eliminate Glaiza and win the race and receive ₩500,000
22	1/08	EP 22 (November 13, 2022)	Pocket Money Race	Rocco Nacino; Empoy Marquez	Oido Pre-Historic Park (Si-Heung, South Korea)	Red Team (Lexi, Ruru, Empoy); Blue Team (Glaiza, Mikael, Rocco); Green Team (Angel, Buboy, Kokoy)	Get the Most Pocket Money to Win	Rocco Wins; Rocco used a Revive Ticket to eliminate Glaiza and win the race and receive ₩500,000
23	1/09	EP 23 (November 19, 2022)	Traditional Game Race	Max Collins	Korean Folk Village (Gyeonggi-Do, South Korea)	Red Light, Green Light (No Teams) Traditional Games Race; Pink Team (Max, Ruru, Angel, Kokoy); Purple Team (Mikael, Glaiza, Lexi, Buboy)	Teams must collect balloons for the Final Race and Eliminate the other team to win the race.	Purple Team Wins; Purple Team eliminated Ruru to win the Race.
24	1/09	EP 24 (November 20, 2022)	Traditional Game Race	Max Collins	Korean Folk Village (Gyeonggi-Do, South Korea)	Red Light, Green Light (No Teams) Traditional Games Race; Pink Team (Max, Ruru, Angel, Kokoy); Purple Team (Mikael, Glaiza, Lexi, Buboy)	Teams must collect balloons for the Final Race and Eliminate the other team to win the race.	Purple Team Wins; Purple Team eliminated Ruru to win the Race.
25	1/10	EP 25 (November 26, 2022)	Running War Race	Chanty of Lapillus; Gabby Eigenmann	Songdo Convensia (In-Cheon, South Korea)	Hostage Round; Pink Team (Chanty, Mikael, Lexi); Blue Team (Gabby, Glaiza, Angel); Black Team (Ruru, Kokoy, Buboy) Running War; Hostages (Lexi, Angel, Buboy)	Teams must survive missions throughout the race, losing teams will choose their hosatages and must save them and Eliminate the other teams in the Final Race to win the race.	Blue Team Wins; Angel eliminates Chanty to win the Race.
26	1/10	EP 26 (November 27, 2022)	Running War Race	Chanty of Lapillus; Gabby Eigenmann	Songdo Convensia (In-Cheon, South Korea)	Hostage Round; Pink Team (Chanty, Mikael, Lexi); Blue Team (Gabby, Glaiza, Angel); Black Team (Ruru, Kokoy, Buboy) Running War; Hostages (Lexi, Angel, Buboy)	Teams must survive missions throughout the race, losing teams will choose their hosatages and must save them and Eliminate the other teams in the Final Race to win the race.	Blue Team Wins; Angel eliminates Chanty to win the Race.
27	1/11	EP 27 (December 3, 2022)	Four Elements Race	Sef Cadayona	Seoul Land (Gwacheon, South Korea)	Yellow Team (Glaiza, Ruru, Angel, Buboy) Blue Team (Mikael, Sef, Kokoy, Lexi)	Teams must gain the most elemental cards by the Final Race to Win	Glaiza Wins; Glaiza eliminates Lexi to win the Race and gained 20 additional cards for the finale.
28	1/11	EP 28 (December 4, 2022)	Four Elements Race	Sef Cadayona	Seoul Land (Gwacheon, South Korea)	Yellow Team (Glaiza, Ruru, Angel, Buboy) Blue Team (Mikael, Sef, Kokoy, Lexi)	Teams must gain the most elemental cards by the Final Race to Win	Glaiza Wins; Glaiza eliminates Lexi to win the Race and gained 20 additional cards for the finale.
29	1/11	EP 29 (December 10, 2022)	Four Elements Race	Sef Cadayona	Suwon Convention Center (Gyeonggi-do, South Korea)	Yellow Team (Glaiza, Ruru, Angel, Buboy) Blue Team (Mikael, Sef, Kokoy, Lexi)	Teams must gain the most elemental cards by the Final Race to Win	Glaiza Wins; Glaiza eliminates Lexi to win the Race and gained 20 additional cards for the finale.
30	1/11	EP 30 (December 11, 2022)	Four Elements Race	Sef Cadayona	Suwon Convention Center (Gyeonggi-do, South Korea)	Yellow Team (Glaiza, Ruru, Angel, Buboy) Blue Team (Mikael, Sef, Kokoy, Lexi)	Teams must gain the most elemental cards by the Final Race to Win	Glaiza Wins; Glaiza eliminates Lexi to win the Race and gained 20 additional cards for the finale.
30	1/12	EP 30 (December 11, 2022)	Superpower Battle	No guests	Goyang Sports Complex (Gyeonggi-do, South Korea)	Human Curling; Glaiza & Lexi; Ruru & Buboy; Kokoy & Angel; Mikael & Jerwin(Staff) Jumbo Soccer Blue Team (Mikael, Glaiza, Kokoy & Buboy); Red Team(Ruru, Angel, Lexi & Pakner(Staff))	Become the 1st ultimate runner of Running Man PH	Angel Wins; Angel eliminates Lexi to become the Ultimate Runner of Season 1.
31	1/12	EP 31 (December 17, 2022)	Superpower Battle	No guests	SBS Tanhyeon Studio (Gyeonggi-do, South Korea)	Human Curling; Glaiza & Lexi; Ruru & Buboy; Kokoy & Angel; Mikael & Jerwin(Staff) Jumbo Soccer Blue Team (Mikael, Glaiza, Kokoy & Buboy); Red Team(Ruru, Angel, Lexi & Pakner(Staff))	Become the 1st ultimate runner of Running Man PH	Angel Wins; Angel eliminates Lexi to become the Ultimate Runner of Season 1.
32	1/12	EP 32 (December 18, 2022)	Superpower Battle	No guests	SBS Tanhyeon Studio (Gyeonggi-do, South Korea)	Human Curling; Glaiza & Lexi; Ruru & Buboy; Kokoy & Angel; Mikael & Jerwin(Staff) Jumbo Soccer Blue Team (Mikael, Glaiza, Kokoy & Buboy); Red Team(Ruru, Angel, Lexi & Pakner(Staff))	Become the 1st ultimate runner of Running Man PH	Angel Wins; Angel eliminates Lexi to become the Ultimate Runner of Season 1.

== Viewership ==
Average TV viewership ratings (in Percentage)
Ep.	Original broadcast date	Aggregated Ratings
Ep.	Original broadcast date	Nutam People Ratings
01	September 3, 2022	14.1% (1st)
02	September 4, 2022	14.4% (2nd)
03	September 10, 2022	14.3% (1st)
04	September 11, 2022	15.0% (2nd)
05	September 17, 2022	14.5% (1st)
06	September 18, 2022	15.5% (2nd)
07	September 24, 2022	13.5% (1st)
08	September 25, 2022	16.8% (2nd)
09	October 01, 2022	13.8% (NA)
10	October 02, 2022	13.2% (NA)
11	October 08, 2022	12.2% (2nd)
12	October 09, 2022	13.4% (2nd)
13	October 15, 2022	13.2% (1st)
14	October 16, 2022	14.7% (2nd)
15	October 22, 2022	13.0% (1st)
16	October 23, 2022	14.7% (2nd)
17	October 29, 2022	14.0% (3rd)
18	October 30, 2022	16.1% (1st)
19	November 05, 2022	13.8% (1st)
20	November 06, 2022	14.2% (2nd)
21	November 12, 2022	12.9% (2nd)
22	November 13, 2022	14.0% (3rd)
23	November 19, 2022	13.1% (1st)
24	November 20, 2022	13.9% (2nd)
25	November 26, 2022	13.1% (NA)
26	November 27, 2022	13.3% (NA)
27	December 03, 2022	13.0% (1st)
28	December 04, 2022	13.4% (2nd)
29	December 10, 2022	12.6% (1st)
30	December 11, 2022	13.3% (2nd)
31	December 17, 2022	11.9% (2nd)
32	December 18, 2022	11.3% (2nd)
In the table above, the blue numbers represent the lowest ratings and the red numbers represent the highest ratings.
Source: NUTAM Peoples Ratings (Nielsen PHils. TAM) Based on Preliminary / Overnight Data
