= Lexi Gonzales =

Filipino actress (born 2000)

- Born: Alexandra Dominique Houghton Gonzales; February 23, 2000 (age 26); Manila, Philippines
- Other name: Nikki Gonzales
- Education: Holy Trinity Academy
- Occupations: Actress; singer
- Years active: 2016–present
- Agents: Star Magic (2016–2019); Sparkle (2019–present)
- Known for: Starstruck; Running Man Philippines; Underage
- Parents: Jonathan Gonzales (father); Karen Houghton (mother)
- Musical career
- Genres: Pop; OPM
- Instrument: Vocals
- Years active: 2020–present
- Label: GMA Music

Alexandra "Lexi" Dominique Houghton Gonzales (Tagalog: [ˈlɛksi ɡɔnˈsalɛs]; born February 23, 2000) is a Filipino actress and singer. She is notable for her participations in reality shows such as StarStruck (2019) and Running Man Philippines (2022).

== Discography ==
=== Single ===
Title	Year	Album
"Something In The Rain"	2021	Non-album single

=== Original soundtracks ===
Title	Year	Album
"Nag-Iisa"	2020	One Hugot Away OST
"Ang Aking Dahilan"	2022	Little Princess OST
"Heaven In Your Eyes"	2022	Love You Stranger OST

== Filmography ==
=== Film ===
Year	Title	Role	Notes	Ref.
2017	Unexpectedly Yours	Cocoy's relative	Minor role	
2018	Mama's Girl	Zak's girlfriend	Guest role	
2018	Class of 2018	Luchi Sweet 'Chynna' Gonzales	Supporting role	
2019	Papa Pogi	Sleeping Beauty	Supporting role	
2019	Mystified	Pauline	Supporting role	

=== Television series ===
Year	Title	Role	Ref.
2016–17	Magpahanggang Wakas	Cheska's friend	
2017	Maalaala Mo Kaya: Bituin	Day	
2017	Maalaala Mo Kaya: Mansanas at Juice	Young Nimfa	
2017	Pusong Ligaw	Vida's friend	
2017	The Good Son	Enzo's winning bidder	
2017	Maalaala Mo Kaya: Kidney	Rizza's sister	
2018	Ipaglaban Mo!: Mulat	Carla	
2018	Maalaala Mo Kaya: Bibliya	Ara	
2018	Ipaglaban Mo!: Gapang	Erica	
2018	Maalaala Mo Kaya: Cards	Rochelle	
2018	Playhouse		
2018	Home Sweetie Home	Stella	
2019	Ipaglaban Mo!: Paasa	Ina	
2019	Magpakailanman: StarStruck Ultimate Survivors	Herself	
2019	Dear Uge: Ateng Kupitera vs. Jowang Huthutera	Ayan	
2019–20	One of the Baes	Isa Mendoza	
2020	Daig Kayo ng Lola Ko: Sa Ilalim ng Buwan	Luna	
2020	Dear Uge: My Lover, the Scammer	Lady	
2021	My Fantastic Pag-ibig: Love Wars	Lovelyn Donato	
2021	Tadhana: Dalawa ang Aking Ina	Mikmik	
2021	Dear Uge: Community Panthief	Zara	
2021	Dear Uge: Macho Dancer daw Ako?	Rebecca	
2021	Regal Studio Presents: Magkaibigan, Nagkaibigan	Lanelle	
2022	Regal Studio Presents: My Third Wish	Tina	
2022	Love You Stranger	Coleen Castro	
2022	Happy ToGetHer	TGirl	
2023	Underage	Celina ''Celine'' Serrano / Celina ''Celine'' Gatchalian	
2023	Tadhana: Secrets	Ayen Corpuz	
2024	Black Rider	Kakay	
2024	Regal Studio Presents: Listen and Love	Monica	
2025	Encantadia Chronicles: Sang'gre	Sari-a	
2025–26	Cruz vs Cruz	Andrea Cruz	
2026	Tadhana: Atty. Sekyu	Hannah	
2026	Taskforce Firewall	Emma Mallari	

=== Television shows ===
Year	Title	Notes	Ref.
2016–17; 2023–present	It's Showtime	GirlTrends member / Co-host / Guest / Performer	
2019	StarStruck	Contestant / First Princess	
2020–present	All-Out Sundays	Co-host / Performer	
2021	Flex	Host	
2022; 2024	Running Man Philippines	Cast member / contestant	
2023	Battle of the Judges	Backstage host	
2023	NCAA Season 99: New Heroes of the Game	Courtside reporter	
2025–present	Stars on the Floor	Co-host	

=== Web series ===
Year	Title	Role	Notes	Platform	Ref.
2018	Alamat ng Ano	Dolores	Supporting role	iWantTFC	
2018	The End	Bea	Supporting role	iWantTFC	
