= Running Man Philippines =

Philippine television reality show

- Season 2 title card
- Genre: Reality competition
- Based on: Running Man (2010) by Cho Hyo-jin, Kim Joo-hyung and Im Hyung-taek
- Directed by: Rico Gutierrez
- Starring: Glaiza de Castro; Ruru Madrid; Mikael Daez; Buboy Villar; Kokoy de Santos; Angel Guardian; Lexi Gonzales; Miguel Tanfelix
- Opening theme: "Running Man" by Running Man Philippines cast
- Country of origin: Philippines
- Original language: Tagalog
- No. of seasons: 2
- No. of episodes: 68

Production
- Executive producer: Roy R. San Luis
- Production location: South Korea
- Camera setup: Multiple-camera setup
- Running time: 36–39 minutes
- Production companies: GMA Entertainment Group; Seoul Broadcasting System

Original release
- Network: GMA Network
- Release: September 3, 2022 – September 8, 2024

Running Man Philippines is a Philippine television reality competition show broadcast by GMA Network. The series is based on a South Korean television variety series of the same title. Directed by Rico Gutierrez, it originally starred Mikael Daez, Glaiza de Castro, Ruru Madrid, Buboy Villar, Kokoy de Santos, Angel Guardian and Lexi Gonzales. It premiered on September 3, 2022 on the network's Sabado Star Power sa Gabi and Sunday Grande sa Gabi line up. Daez, de Castro, Villar, de Santos, Guardian, Gonzales and Miguel Tanfelix currently serve as the cast. The show concluded on September 8, 2024, with a total of two seasons and 68 episodes.

The show is streaming online on YouTube.

== Premise ==
The show aims to showcase missions that are deemed "outrageous". Missions consisting of games and races, with contestants challenging to acquire advantages for the last mission.

== Cast ==
Cast

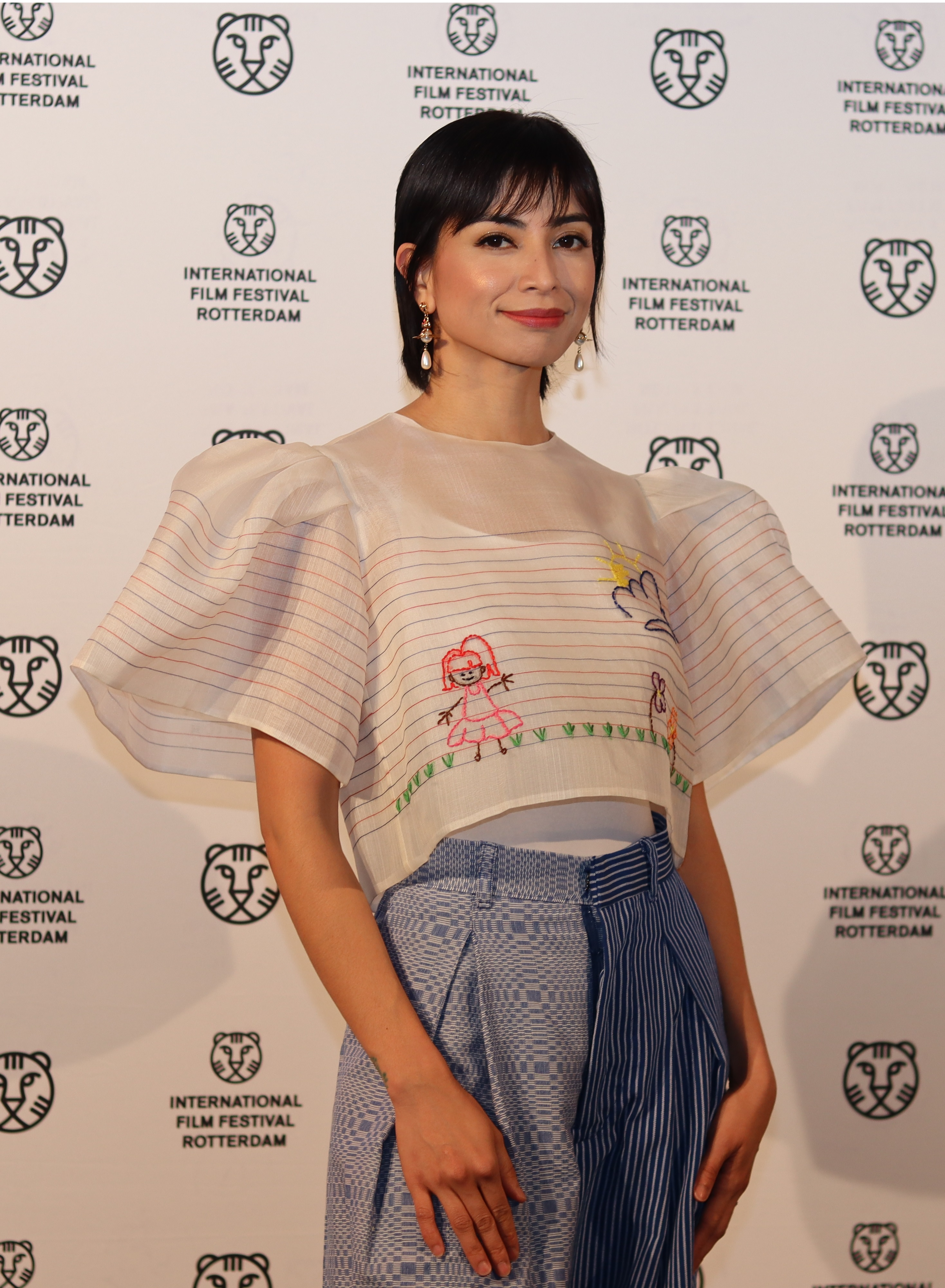
Glaiza de Castro

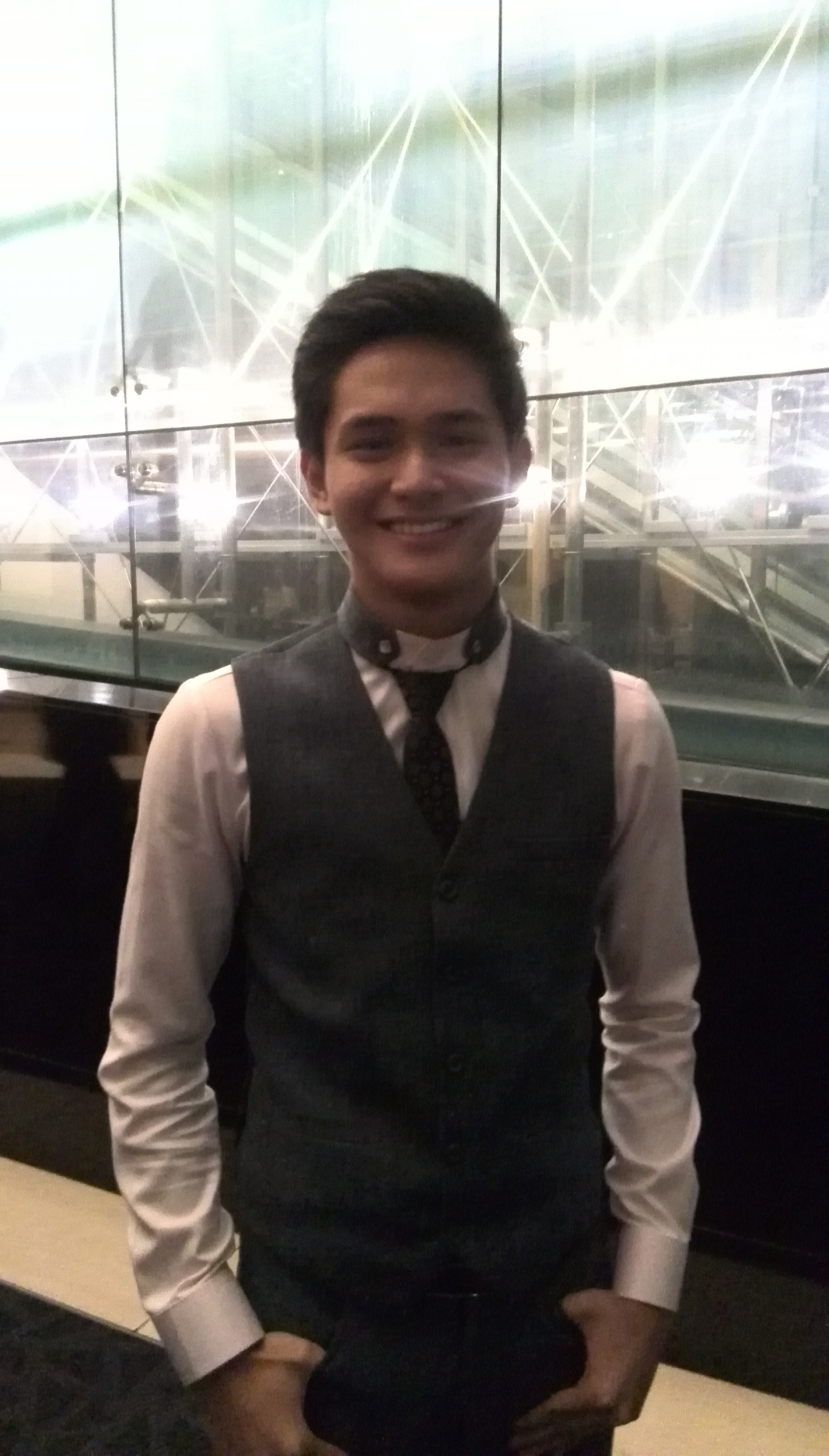
Ruru Madrid

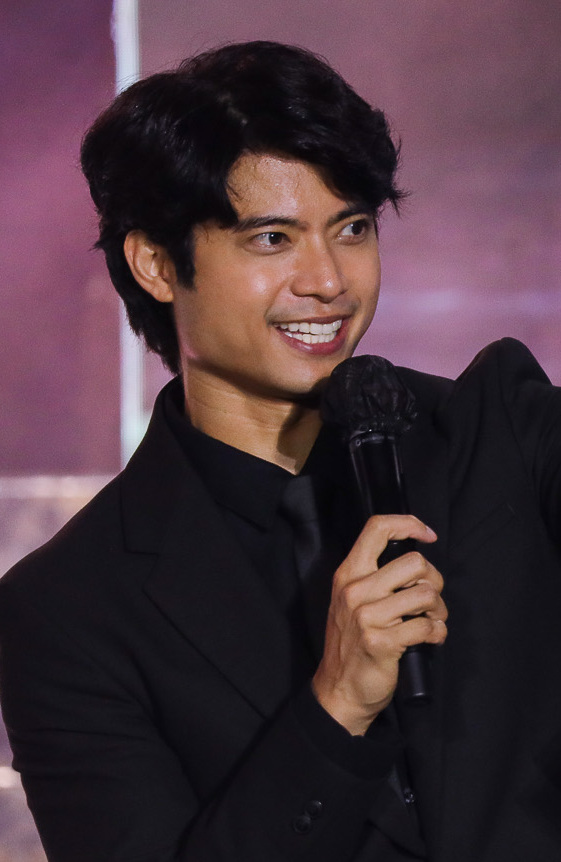
Mikael Daez

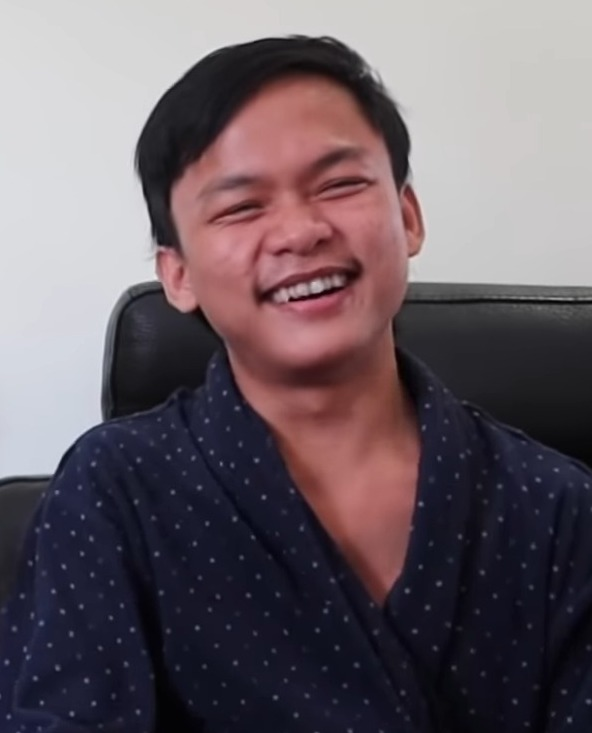
Buboy Villar

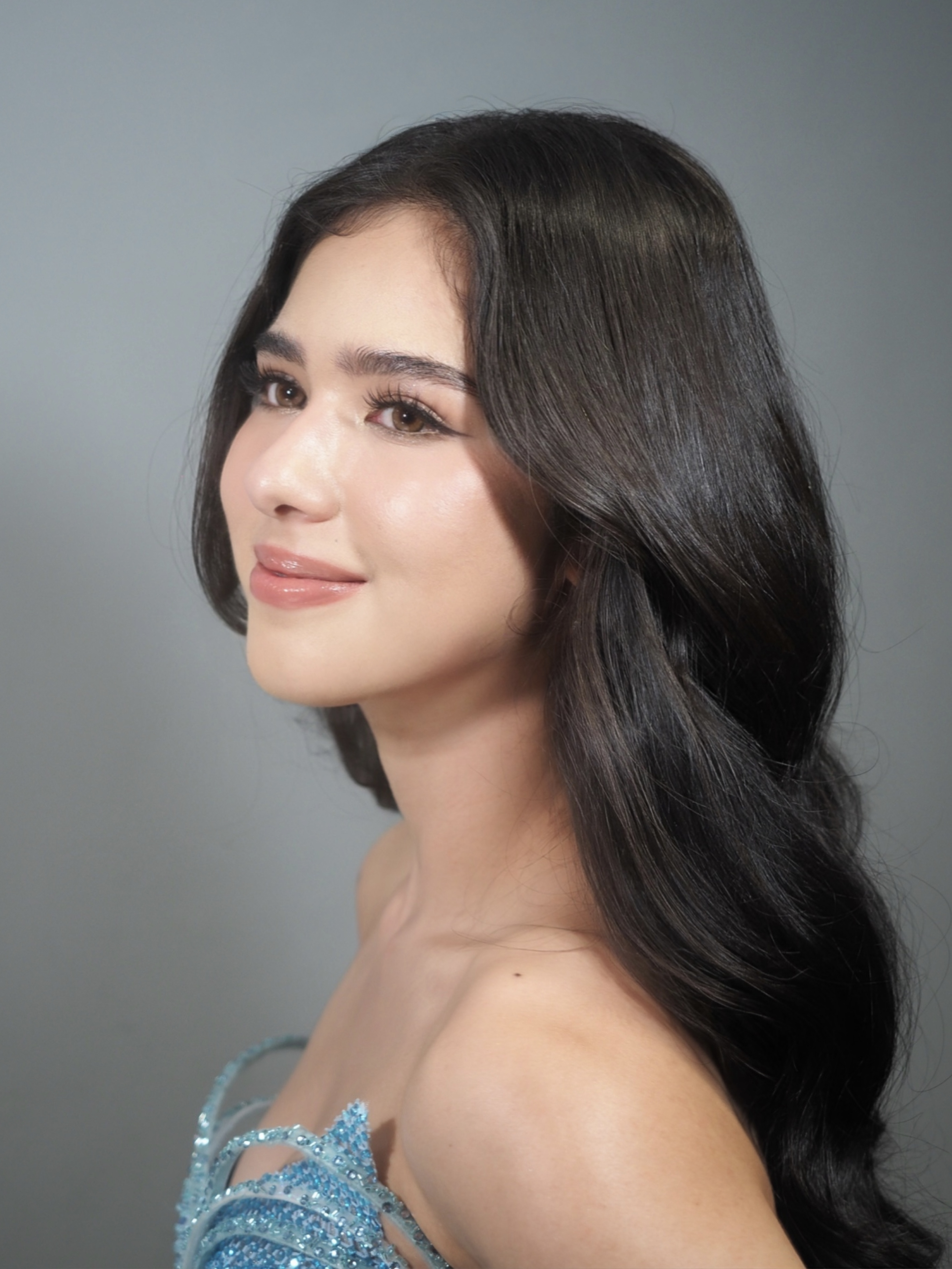
Angel Guardian

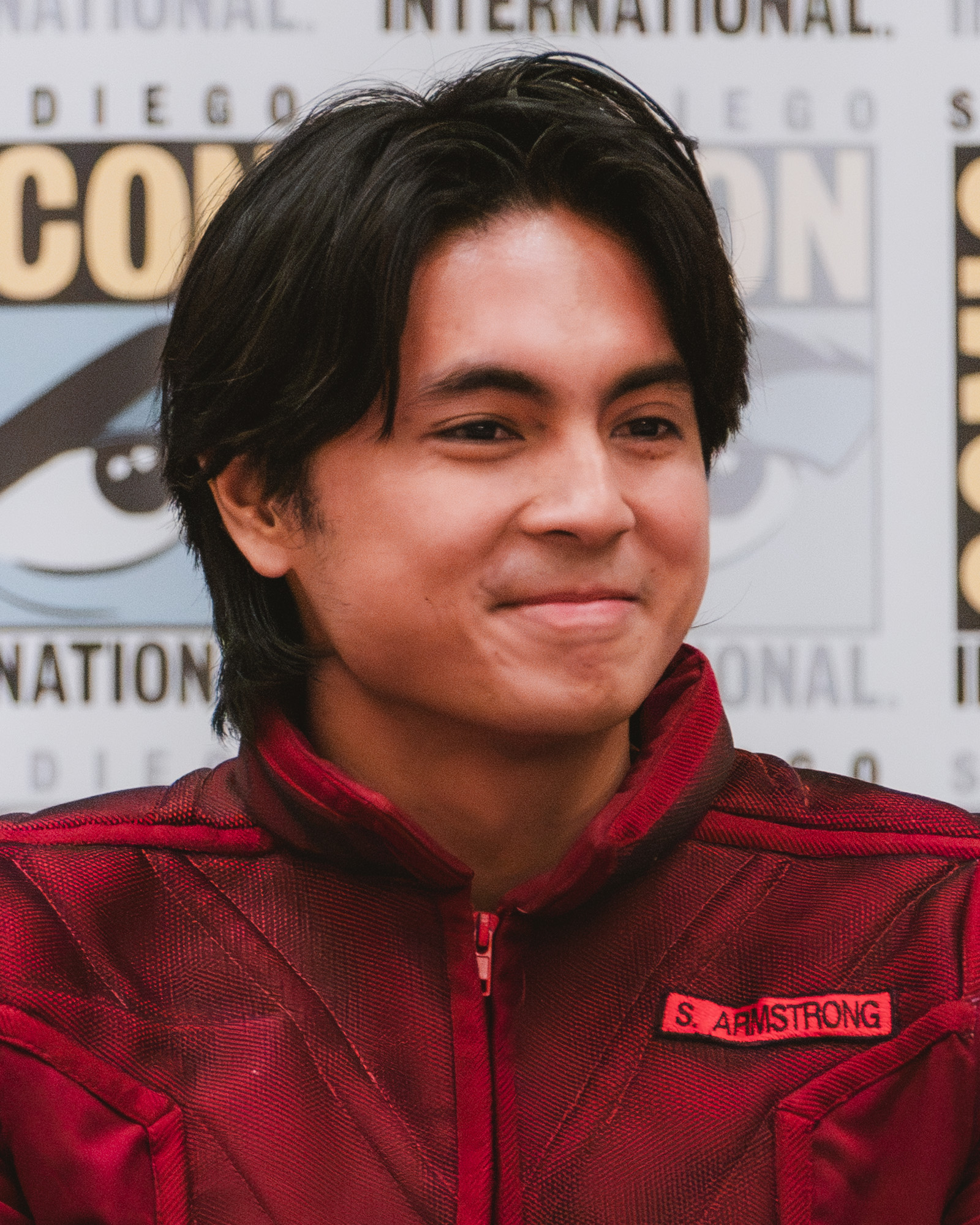
Miguel Tanfelix

- Glaiza de Castro
- Ruru Madrid
- Mikael Daez
- Buboy Villar
- Kokoy de Santos
- Angel Guardian
- Lexi Gonzales
- Miguel Tanfelix (season 2)

== Seasons ==
Season	Episodes	Originally released	
Season	Episodes	First released	Last released
1	32	September 3, 2022	December 18, 2022
2	36	May 11, 2024	September 8, 2024

== Production ==
On February 11, 2020, GMA Network announced the co-production deal with Seoul Broadcasting System for the reality-comedy game show, Running Man Philippines. Production was postponed due to the COVID-19 pandemic.

Principal photography commenced for the first season in July 2022 in South Korea. Filming began for the second season in January 2024.

== Ratings ==
According to AGB Nielsen Philippines' Nationwide Urban Television Audience Measurement People in television homes, the pilot episode of Running Man Philippines earned a 14.1% rating. The second season's premiere scored an 11.2% rating.
