= Koncepto Millenya =

General information
- Type: Vertical take-off and landing (VTOL) ultralight aircraft
- National origin: Philippines
- Status: In development

History
- First flight: September 2018

The Koncepto Millenya, or simply Millenya, is a concept for a vertical take-off and landing (VTOL) ultralight aircraft developed by Kyxz Mendiola. Often referred to as a "flying car" the aircraft was developed by its inventor as a means to cope with heavy road traffic in Manila.

== Background ==
The Millenya ultralight aircraft was developed by Kyxz Mendiola, a Filipino drone enthusiast. Mendiola, who taught himself engineering and aircraft design, cited his "extreme" feeling towards the concept of flying as his motive for pursuing the project and was motivated even more as he learns about efforts from different countries in developing similar endeavours. He also named the deteriorating traffic situation in Metro Manila as a motivator in developing the Millenya and envisioned people flying to their destination in minutes instead them spending two to three hours riding traditional road transport. Millenya's inventor has described his creation as a "flying sports car".

== Design and development ==
Kyxz Mendiola began developing Millenya in the early 2010s, using his own money to fund his project in its early years of development. Friends and relatives later helped him in his project. Millions of pesos and at least six years has been spent for the development of the aircraft.

Mendiola has named "disappointment, mocking and discouraging words" as a hindrance to the development of the Millenya. He intends the vehicle to be similar to a sports car; a "flying Lamborghini". Trial and error method is used with Mendiola experimenting with different parts. In at least one test, his vehicle caught fire. In September 2018, the aircraft had its first public maiden flight in Batangas. After a video featuring the aircraft went viral in social media, Australian firm Star8 has expressed interest in partnering with Mendiola to develop Millenya for mass production.

The vehicle is a single-seater vertical take-off and landing (VTOL) aircraft. Millenya is reinforced by a metal frame covered with carbon fiber shell. As of September 2018, the aircraft can carry a payload of 80 to 100 kilograms (180 to 220 lb) and can fly at 50 to 60 kilometers per hour (31 to 37 mph). It has flown at a height of 6.1 to 7.6 meters (20 to 25 ft) and has flown 10 to 15 minutes at a time. It is powered by six lithium-ion batteries, taking around two and a half hours to charge completely. The vehicle is controllable by its lone passenger through a portable radio frequency controller; the vehicle controls its altitude through a button while it can maneuver through a steering stick. Devising "multicopter" technology frequently used in drones, Millenya achieves flight through its 16 rotary motors which is designed in a way that the vehicle can still fly safely even if one or two motors are compromised.

== Future project ==
A two-seater aircraft which has a payload capacity of 200 kilograms (440 lb) is planned for development..

== Specifications ==
General characteristics

- Crew: One pilot
- Capacity: 80 to 100 kg (180 to 220 lb) payload

Performance

- Maximum speed: 60 km/h (37 mph, 32 kn)
- Endurance: 15 minutes
- Service ceiling: 7.6 m (25 ft)
