= Beomnyunsa =

Buddhist temple in Yongin, South Korea

- 법륜사
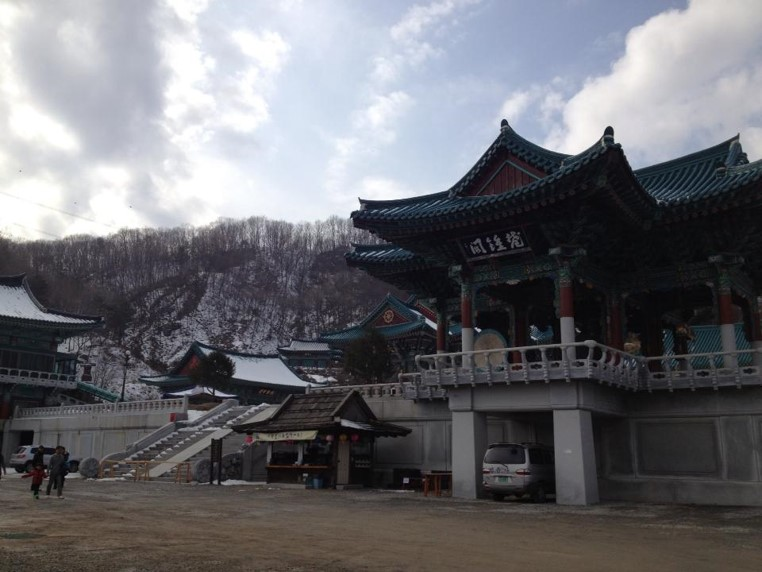
- Beomnyunsa Temple in South Korea

- Location within South Korea

Religion
- Affiliation: Jogye Order of Korean Buddhism

Location
- Location: 126 Nongchon Park-ro Wonsam-myeon Cheoin-gu Yongin city Gyeonggi Province (Korean: 경기도 용인시 처인구 원삼면 농촌파크로 126)
- Country: South Korea
- Coordinates: 37°10′10.6″N 127°17′54.6″E

Beomnyunsa (Korean: 법륜사) is a Buddhist temple of the Jogye Order in Yongin-si, South Korea.

== History ==
Beomnyunsa was established by Ven. Sangnyun (aka. Muadang) in 2005. While Sangnyun was practicing at Seunggasa Temple on Mt. Samgaksan (now called Mt. Bukhansan) in Seoul in 1996, she saw Avalokitêśvara (Bodhisattva of Compassion) in her dream, and then established Beomnyunsa in the foothills of Mt. Munsusan in Yongin City.

The terrain around Beomnyunsa is surrounded by lotus flowers. The temple's structures were built from red pine logged on Baekdusan Mountain in North Korea, and Buddha statues were carved from hwangdeungseok (a type of granite) from Iksan. Especially noteworthy is the Main Buddha Hall, built in the unusual shape of the Chinese character “亞,” and the main Buddha statue which is three times as big as the one in Seokguram Grotto.

Ven. Sangnyun said her only wish was that the temple remain for a long time as a precious cultural heritage of Korea. Now more than ten years since its establishment, the temple is recognized as a major place dedicated to Avalokitêśvara and attracts many visitors. Its operational principle is clearly expressed in the phrase “Beomnyunsa, overflowing with compassion and happiness,” and as it becomes known to a wider public day by day, it is growing into a temple where devotees can study together and share the joy of the Dharma.

== Cultural properties ==
In front of the temple's Gwaneumjeon Hall stands its only designated cultural property, the Three-Story Stone Pagoda of Beomnyunsa (Cultural Heritage Material of Gyeonggido, No. 145). The pagoda originally stood at the house of Mr. Lee Deok-mun in Guro-dong, Seoul, who donated it and moved it to the temple. Although its year of production is not clearly known, it seems to be in the style of the Unified Silla era.

== Tourism ==
Around Beomnyunsa are concentrated some of the biggest entertainment facilities in Korea, including a Korean Folk Village, Everland Resort and Hantaek Botanical Garden, all of which can be reached in 30 minutes by car from the temple. Established in Giheung, Yongin City in 1974, the Korean Folk Village is a tourist attraction featuring traditional Korean culture where visitors can see and experience the way people lived in the Joseon dynasty (1392–1910). It also offers temple stay programs where visitors can experience Buddhist culture.

== Gallery ==
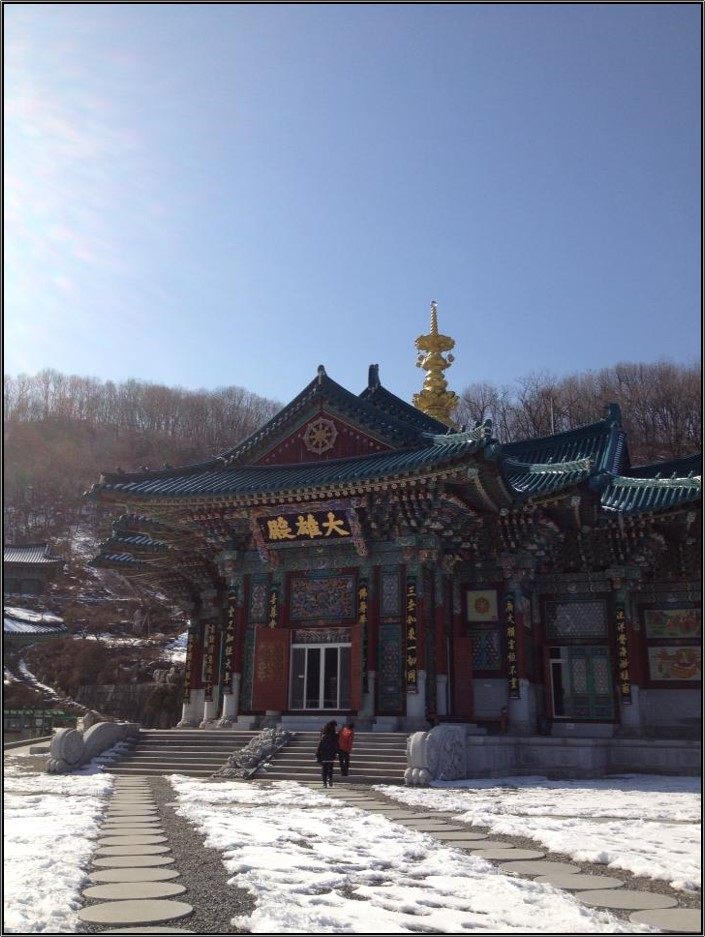

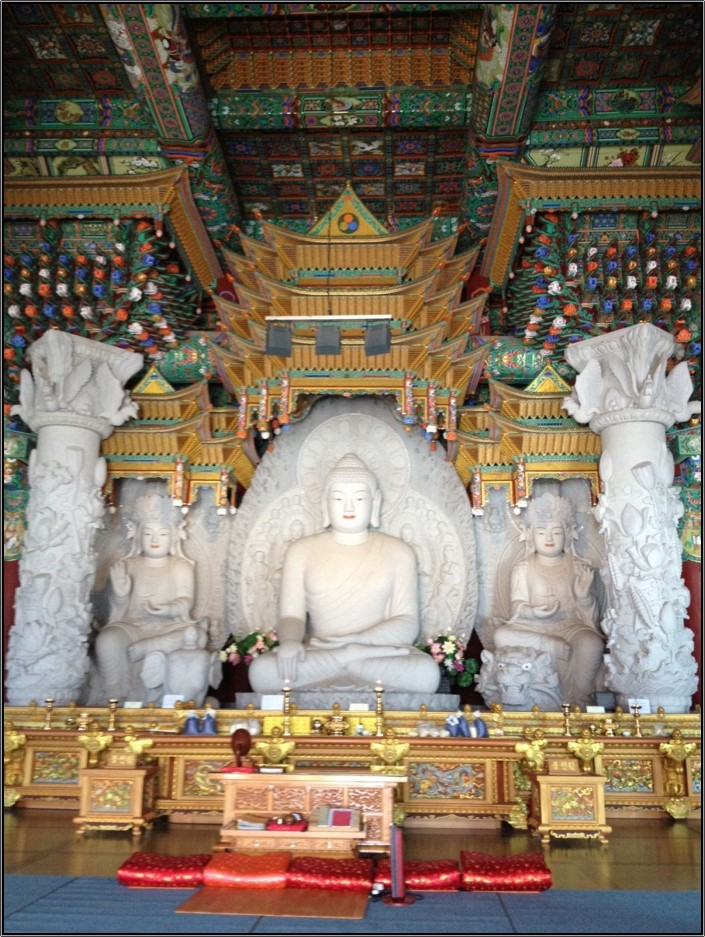

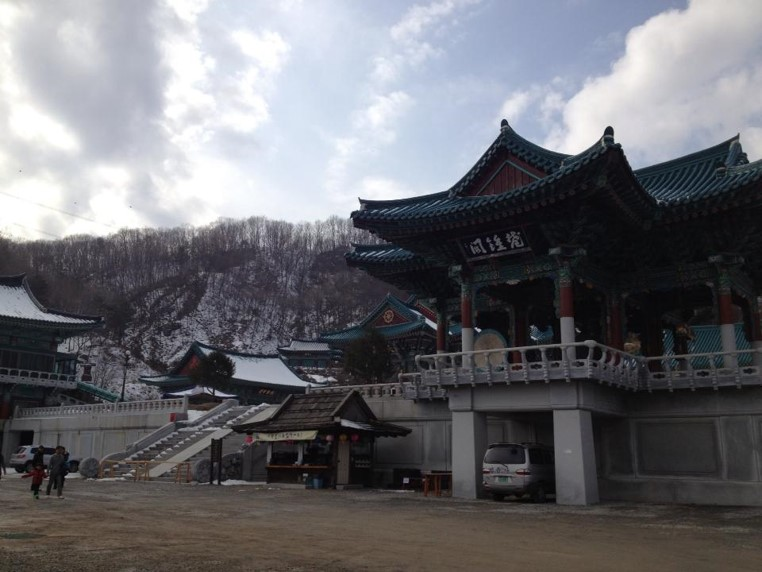
