= StarStruck season 7 =

Season of a Philippine television reality show

StarStruck
- Season 7
- Title card 2019
- No. of episodes: 28

Release
- Original network: GMA Network
- Original release: June 15 – September 15, 2019

Season chronology
- ← Previous; Season 6

The seventh and final season of StarStruck, is a 2019 Philippine television reality talent competition show, was broadcast on GMA Network. Hosted by Dingdong Dantes and Jennylyn Mercado, it premiered on June 15, 2019. The council was composed of Heart Evangelista, Cherie Gil and Jose Manalo. The season ended with 28 episodes on September 15, 2019, having Shayne Sava and Kim de Leon as the Ultimate Survivors.

The series is streaming online on YouTube.

== Overview ==
=== Auditions ===
Key cities for the auditions.

In the last quarter of 2018, GMA Network announced the audition requirements and dates through a series of television plugs The StarStruck Experience TV commercials and website articles. For this season, the age limit is set from 16 to 21 years old. Much of the auditions were held at the GMA Network Center and at SM Supermalls throughout the Philippines.

The following dates and key cities for the auditions are as follows:

Casting Dates (2019)	Key Cities
January 21	Manila
January 26	Cagayan de Oro
January 27	Butuan
February 9–10	Naga
February 16–17	Cebu
March 2–3	Davao
March 9	Iloilo
March 10	Bacolod
March 23–24	Dagupan

This season was directed by Monti Parungao and Rommel Gacho. Aside from the six seasons, The season marked the first time that can be only aired on weekends, with Saturdays and Sundays having either tests or elimination night. The show held its the Final Judgment on September 15, 2019, at the GMA Network Studio Annex (Studio 7).

A companion online show, Inside StarStruck, was hosted by Kyline Alcantara. It aired every weekday on the show's Facebook and YouTube accounts.

== Selection process ==
In the seventh year of the reality-talent search, Out of numerous who auditioned nationwide, only the Top 80 dreamers were chosen for the call-back. The screening committee for this stage was composed of the Gina Alajar, Mark Reyes and Tony Tuviera. After which, the number was trimmed down to Top 40 for the Judges Preview, and finally, Top 22 hopefuls wherein the selected hopefuls will compete for a spot in final fourteen finalists as they face their Final Audition.

After the Final 14 were chosen, the season introduced a new twist called the Second Chance Challenge, wherein the Top 22 hopefuls who were originally eliminated in the Final Audition were given the opportunity to be reinstated in the competition by performing a dramatic acting test by pairs (male and female). Before the second live results, the council will select one male and one female contestant from the semi-finalists to advance in the finals after the elimination of the original batch of final fourteen hopefuls by each gender.

The new set of Final 14 underwent various workshops and trainings in order to develop their personalities, talents, and charisma. But, the twist is that every week, one or two of the final fourteen may have to say goodbye until only four remain. Those who were eliminated were dubbed as StarStruck Avengers.

The Final 4 will vied for the coveted the Ultimate Survivors titles, the Ultimate Male Survivor and Ultimate Female Survivor, both of them received P1,000,000 pesos each plus and a five year an exclusive management contract from GMA Network worth P5,000,000 pesos each, and a house and lot from (Lessandra) Camella Homes.

The First Prince and First Princess, both of them received P250,000 pesos each plus and an exclusive management contract from the network. The StarStruck Avengers (the losing contestants) also received an exclusive contract from the network..

It also featured two batches in StarStruck History, the original and new set of Final 14 in the third week.

== Hopefuls ==
=== Final Audition ===
In this season, a new stage call the Final Audition was introduced wherein the Top 22 hopefuls were paired by twos or threes, according to their performances from previous stages. A hopeful will be given the chance to showcase his or her chosen talent, aside from an acting piece through a form of a video clip that will later be shown. The council will then pick one or two hopefuls that will qualify to the next round and will be included in the show's Final 14.

Color key:

Contestant was chosen to the Final 14
Contestant was eliminated

Episode 1 (June 15, 2019)

Name	Age	Hometown	Result
Pamela Prinster	18	Cavite City	Final 14
Crystal Paras	21	Quezon City, Metro Manila	Eliminated

Name	Age	Hometown	Result
Karl Aquino	18	Imus, Cavite	Final 14
Nahuel Prieto	19	Sydney, Australia	Eliminated
Abdul Raman	16	Marikina	Final 14

Episode 2 (June 16, 2019)

Name	Age	Hometown	Result
Kim de Leon	19	Balayan, Batangas	Final 14
Gelo Alagban	17	Iloilo City	Final 14
Marc David	19	Marikina	Eliminated

Name	Age	Hometown	Result
Dani Porter	17	Quezon City	Final 14
Kyle Lucasan	21	Antipolo, Rizal	Eliminated
Angelic Guzman	18	Biñan, Laguna	Final 14

Episode 3 (June 22, 2019)

Name	Age	Hometown	Result
Maynard Fullido	19	Tagbilaran, Bohol	Eliminated
Jeremy Sabido	21	Liliw, Laguna	Final 14

Name	Age	Hometown	Result
Rere Madrid	18	Marikina	Final 14
Janelle Lewis	17	Angeles, Pampanga	Eliminated
Lexi Gonzales	19	Sampaloc, Manila	Final 14

Episode 4 (June 23, 2019)

Name	Age	Hometown	Result
Ella Cristofani	18	Pateros, Metro Manila	Final 14
MJ Felizarta	18	Cebu City	Eliminated
Shayne Sava	17	Binangonan, Rizal	Final 14

Name	Age	Hometown	Result
Allen Ansay	16	Sagñay, Camarines Sur	Final 14
Radson Flores	19	Taguig	Eliminated
Jerick Dolormente	20	Libmanan, Camarines Sur	Final 14

=== Second Chance Challenge ===
After the first live results on June 30, 2019, the season introduced a new twist called the Second Chance Challenge, wherein the Top 22 hopefuls who were originally eliminated in the Final Auditions were given the opportunity to be reinstated in the competition by performing a dramatic acting test by pairs (male and female), except for Nahuel Prieto and MJ Felizarta, both of whom chose not to participate in this challenge.

Before the second live results, the council will select one male and one female contestant from the semi-finalists to advance to the finals after the elimination of Angelic Guzman and Gelo Alagban, the two original batches of final fourteen by each gender. Crystal Paras and Radson Flores returned to the competition on July 7, 2019.

When the new set of Final 14 was chosen, they are assigned to different challenges every week that will hone their acting, singing, and dancing abilities. Every Saturday and Sunday, one is meant to leave the competition until there were just six others who are left. From final six, there will be two of them who will be eliminated and after the elimination the two; the final four' will be revealed.

The Final 4 will be battling with each other on the Final Judgment. People will choose who they want to win the competition by online voting via Google accounts and text voting. 50% of the result will come from the online and text votes and the remaining 50% is from the council.

=== Last Chance Challenge ===
Originally, two contestants will be sent home on August 4, 2019, Sunday live results, until the second twist of the season was introduced called the Last Chance Challenge. Ella Cristofani and Jeremy Sabido, who got the lowest combined scores, will be competing against next week's bottom two performers for a spot in the Final 8. From it, the council will then choose two hopefuls (one per gender) to advance in the completion.

The bottom two finalists from each gender will face Ella Cristofani and Jeremy Sabido in the last chance challenge to determine the council's vote to advance in the final eight. The host, Dingdong Dantes took over the council member, Jose Manalo to grade the contestants for this family remembrance scene to announce the council's vote to advance in the final eight week, with the bottom two revealed, the contestants act out in their individual performances in a short play of an Ella Cristofani and Jeremy Sabido is the Challenger last week. Lexi Gonzles and Radson Flores is the bottom two this week. The council Save: Jeremy Sabido and Lexi Gonzales, while Ella Cristofani and Radson Flores was eliminated on August 11, 2019.

Color key:

Male contestant
Female contestant
Semi-finalist
Finalist
Runner-up
Winner

Place	Contestant	Age	Hometown	Exit	Result
1	Shayne Sava	17	Binangonan, Rizal	September 15, 2019	Ultimate Female Survivor
2	Kim de Leon	19	Balayan, Batangas	September 15, 2019	Ultimate Male Survivor
3	Lexi Gonzales	19	Sampaloc, Manila	September 15, 2019	First Princess
4	Allen Ansay	16	Sagñay, Camarines Sur	September 15, 2019	First Prince
5	Pamela Prinster	18	Cavite City	September 8, 2019	Avenger
6	Abdul Raman	16	Marikina	September 7, 2019	Avenger
7	Dani Porter	17	Quezon City	August 25, 2019	Avenger
8	Jeremy Sabido	21	Liliw, Laguna	August 18, 2019	Avenger
9	Radson Flores	19	Taguig	August 11, 2019	Avenger
10	Ella Cristofani	18	Pateros, Metro Manila	August 11, 2019	Avenger
11	Rere Madrid	18	Marikina	July 28, 2019	Avenger
12	Jerick Dolormente	20	Libmanan, Camarines Sur	July 21, 2019	Avenger
13	Crystal Paras	21	Quezon City	July 14, 2019	Avenger
14	Karl Aquino	18	Imus, Cavite	July 13, 2019	Avenger
15	Gelo Alagban	17	Iloilo City	July 7, 2019	Avenger
16	Angelic Guzman	18	Biñan, Laguna	July 7, 2019	Avenger
17	MJ Felizarta	18	Cebu City	June 23, 2019	Top 18
18	Maynard Fullido	19	Tagbilaran, Bohol	June 22, 2019	Top 18
19	Janelle Lewis	17	Angeles, Pampanga	June 22, 2019	Top 18
21	Marc David	19	Marikina	June 16, 2019	Top 22
20	Kyle Lucasan	21	Antipolo, Rizal	June 16, 2019	Top 22
22	Nahuel Prieto	19	Sydney, Australia	June 15, 2019	Top 22

== Weekly Artist Tests ==
Color key:

Contestant with the highest Public Vote and Council Vote
Contestant was saved by the Public Vote and Council Vote
Contestant was in the Bottom Group
Contestant was eliminated
Contestant was in the Final 14 and Final 4
Contestant advanced to the next round
Contestant did not participate
Contestant was the Wild Card, saved by the Council
Contestant's results were unannounced
Contestant finished as the Runner-up
Contestant won

Week 1-2: This season, a new stage call the Final Audition was introduced wherein the Top 22 hopefuls, the council was to select the Final 14 hopefuls.

Contestant	Result
Karl Aquino	Final 14
Nahuel Prieto	Eliminated
Abdul Raman	Final 14
Kim de Leon	Final 14
Gelo Alagban	Final 14
Marc David	Eliminated
Maynard Fullido	Eliminated
Jeremy Sabido	Final 14
Allen Ansay	Final 14
Radson Flores	Eliminated
Jerick Dolormente	Final 14

Contestant	Result
Pamela Prinster	Final 14
Crystal Paras	Eliminated
Dani Porter	Final 14
Kyle Lucasan	Eliminated
Angelic Guzman	Final 14
Rere Madrid	Final 14
Janelle Lewis	Eliminated
Lexi Gonzales	Final 14
Ella Cristofani	Final 14
MJ Felizarta	Eliminated
Shayne Sava	Final 14

Week 3: Acting Reacting

Mark A. Reyes instructed the Final 14 who were divided into pairs (one boy and one girl) to face the first challenge by acting in a small scene of any genre while focusing into the characters' reactions at the same time. The StarStruck alumni who were assigned to each pair's scene were Rich Asuncion, Katrina Halili, Liezel Lopez, Nikki Co, Dave Bornea, Chariz Solomon, and Dion Ignacio.

Contestant	Votes	Result
Karl Aquino	50.0%	Safe
Abdul Raman	59.9%	Safe
Kim de Leon	61.6%	Highest Vote
Gelo Alagban	56.6%	Safe
Jeremy Sabido	60.1%	Safe
Allen Ansay	53.9%	Safe
Jerick Dolormente	57.3%	Safe

Contestant	Votes	Result
Pamela Prinster	56.2%	Safe
Dani Porter	53.8%	Safe
Angelic Guzman	50.1%	Safe
Rere Madrid	55.2%	Safe
Lexi Gonzales	50.9%	Safe
Ella Cristofani	85.5%	Highest Vote
Shayne Sava	57.1%	Safe

Second Chance Challenge

Contestant	Result
Nahuel Prieto	Did not participate
Marc David	Advanced
Maynard Fullido	Advanced
Radson Flores	Advanced

Contestant	Result
Crystal Paras	Advanced
Kyle Lucasan	Advanced
Janelle Lewis	Advanced
MJ Felizarta	Did not participate

Week 4: Comedy Challenge

Michael V. and Bubble Gang writer and director Caesar Cosme assigned the finalists by pairs to perform two comedy skits with the show's cast and perform a short clip of a comedic reaction. Before the live results, the StarStruck council selected Radson Flores and Crystal Paras who won the Second Chance Challenge to advance in the Finals before the elimination of the two from the original Final 14 by each gender.

Original set of Final 14

Contestant	Votes	Result
Karl Aquino	79.2%	Safe
Abdul Raman	82.9%	Safe
Kim de Leon	94.2%	Highest Vote
Gelo Alagban	63.2%	Eliminated
Jeremy Sabido	86.8%	Safe
Allen Ansay	77.1%	Safe
Jerick Dolormente	82.1%	Safe

Contestant	Votes	Result
Pamela Prinster	79.0%	Safe
Dani Porter	79.3%	Safe
Angelic Guzman	74.2%	Eliminated
Rere Madrid	79.9%	Safe
Lexi Gonzales	88.2%	Safe
Ella Cristofani	89.3%	Highest Vote
Shayne Sava	81.8%	Safe

Second Chance Challenger

Contestant	Result
Marc David	Eliminated
Maynard Fullido	Eliminated
Radson Flores	Second Chance Challenge

Contestant	Result
Crystal Paras	Second Chance Challenge
Kyle Lucasan	Eliminated
Janelle Lewis	Eliminated

New set of Final 14

Contestant	Result
Karl Aquino	Final 14
Abdul Raman	Final 14
Kim de Leon	Final 14
Jeremy Sabido	Final 14
Allen Ansay	Final 14
Jerick Dolormente	Final 14
Radson Flores	Wild Card

Contestant	Result
Pamela Prinster	Final 14
Dani Porter	Final 14
Rere Madrid	Final 14
Lexi Gonzales	Final 14
Ella Cristofani	Final 14
Shayne Sava	Final 14
Crystal Paras	Wild Card

Week 5: Sampal Serye and Direct Action

The finalists are grouped into twos and threes by gender on their on screen take set by director Gil Tejada with veteran actress Aiko Melendez. They are assigned with a different script and scenario for the boys and girls. The live results for the boys are revealed on July 13 while the girls on July 14.

Contestant	Votes	Result
Karl Aquino	63.8%	Eliminated
Abdul Raman	86.4%	Safe
Kim de Leon	91.3%	Highest Vote
Jeremy Sabido	81.7%	Safe
Allen Ansay	76.0%	Bottom 3
Jerick Dolormente	75.6%	Bottom 3
Radson Flores	90.1%	Safe

Contestant	Votes	Result
Pamela Prinster	87.1%	Highest Vote
Dani Porter	74.2%	Bottom 3
Rere Madrid	86.9%	Safe
Lexi Gonzales	77.8%	Safe
Ella Cristofani	86.8%	Safe
Shayne Sava	76.4%	Bottom 3
Crystal Paras	73.5%	Eliminated

Week 6: Kilabot Serye

The six remaining finalists are divided into two groups to act in a short thriller play challenged by Jorron Monroy, director of the upcoming afternoon drama series Hanggang sa Dulo ng Buhay Ko. The first group will act out in the school shooting scene with Gabby Eigenmann while the last group portrayed in the home invasion story with Kris Bernal.

Contestant	Votes	Result
Abdul Raman	77.9%	Safe
Kim de Leon	87.4%	Highest Vote
Jeremy Sabido	85.9%	Safe
Allen Ansay	76.4%	Safe
Jerick Dolormente	74.0%	Eliminated
Radson Flores	80.9%	Safe

Contestant	Votes	Result
Pamela Prinster	85.0%	Highest Vote
Dani Porter	84.0%	Safe
Rere Madrid	82.5%	Safe
Lexi Gonzales	75.6%	Bottom 2
Ella Cristofani	83.4%	Safe
Shayne Sava	79.7%	Safe

Week 7: Hugot Challenge

The eleven finalists portrayed their on-screen heartbreak romance scenes with actors Ken Chan from My Special Tatay for the girls and Barbie Forteza from Kara Mia for the boys, instructed by director LA Madridejos. During the live results, the contestant with the lowest number of votes from the public and the StarStruck council will be sent to The Danger Seat before the final results are revealed on July 28.

Contestant	Votes	Result
Abdul Raman	75.7%	Bottom 3
Kim de Leon	85.5%	Safe
Jeremy Sabido	82.3%	Safe
Allen Ansay	77.9%	Safe
Radson Flores	94.8%	Highest Vote

Contestant	Votes	Result
Pamela Prinster	84.1%	Safe
Dani Porter	81.2%	Bottom 3
Rere Madrid	75.3%	Eliminated
Lexi Gonzales	81.6%	Safe
Ella Cristofani	89.7%	Highest Vote
Shayne Sava	83.0%	Safe

Week 8: Conflict Challenge with Ms. Cherie Gil

Council member Cherie Gil was joined with Gina Alajar to direct the ten finalists who portray siblings (5 brothers and 5 sisters) with the actress in a family drama short play. The setting of the story was a family memorial. Originally, two contestants were sent home on the Sunday live results, until the second twist of the season was introduced called "The Last Chance Challenge". Jeremy Sabido and Ella Cristofani, who got the lowest combined scores will be competing against next week's bottom two performers for a spot in the Final 8. From it, the StarStruck council will then choose two hopefuls (one per gender) to advance in the competition.

Contestant	Votes	Result
Abdul Raman	86.6%	Safe
Kim de Leon	84.0%	Bottom 2
Jeremy Sabido	83.5%	Last Chance Challenge
Allen Ansay	95.5%	Highest Vote
Radson Flores	90.3%	Safe

Contestant	Votes	Result
Pamela Prinster	87.6%	Safe
Dani Porter	93.9%	Highest Vote
Lexi Gonzales	82.4%	Safe
Ella Cristofani	79.3%	Last Chance Challenge
Shayne Sava	81.9%	Bottom 2

Week 9: Action Challenge

Director Dominic Zapata instructs the eight finalists by pairs (one boy and one girl) to perform the scenes of a school fight with actress Jean Garcia who portrays the school principal. The bottom two finalists from each gender will face Cristofani and Sabido in the Last Chance Challenge to determine the council's vote to advance in the Top 8. Host Dingdong Dantes took over council member Jose Manalo to grade the contestants for this week. With the Bottom 2 revealed, the contestants act out in their individual performances in a short play of a family remembrance scene to announce the council's vote to advance in the Top 8.

Contestant	Votes	Result
Abdul Raman	92.5%	Safe
Kim de Leon	99.0%	Highest Vote
Allen Ansay	90.5%	Safe
Radson Flores	89.6%	Bottom 2

Contestant	Votes	Result
Pamela Prinster	89.3%	Safe
Dani Porter	97.5%	Highest Vote
Lexi Gonzales	88.7%	Bottom 2
Shayne Sava	93.6%	Safe

Last Chance Challenger

Contestant	Result
Jeremy Sabido	Judges Saved
Radson Flores	Eliminated

Contestant	Result
Lexi Gonzales	Judges Saved
Ella Cristofani	Eliminated

Week 10: Fiction Drama Test

The final eight finalists used their skills of perception to portray in an Action-fantasy drama play instructed by Rico Gutierrez, director of Daig Kayo ng Lola Ko, with actress Rhian Ramos portraying the villain in two segments for the boys and girls. The girls portrayed witches fighting for the spell book against the evil witch while the boys portrayed superhuman mutants fighting against a rebel mutant. The Danger Seat was re-introduced on the Saturday night live results until the Sunday night live eliminations.

Contestant	Votes	Result
Abdul Raman	83.5%	Safe
Kim de Leon	98.8%	Highest Vote
Jeremy Sabido	82.8%	Eliminated
Allen Ansay	92.1%	Safe

Contestant	Votes	Result
Pamela Prinster	83.0%	Bottom 2
Dani Porter	95.5%	Highest Vote
Lexi Gonzales	85.4%	Safe
Shayne Sava	88.2%	Safe

Week 11: Versatility Challenge

The 7 on 7 twist was introduced. The final seven finalists will be assisted and mentored by StarStruck graduates from previous seasons until the show's Final Judgment. As for their acting test, the hopefuls were tasked to test their versatility as actors and portray dual opposite roles. Helping them in this challenge were The Better Woman director Mark Sicat dela Cruz and actress Carmina Villarroel. The boys portrayed their dual roles with their ailing mother while the girls portrayed as a barrio worker and a mean rich sister.

Contestant	StarStruck Alumna Mentor	Votes	Result
Abdul Raman	Miguel Tanfelix	84.7%	Bottom 3
Kim de Leon	Mark Herras	97.5%	Highest Vote
Allen Ansay	Kris Bernal	91.3%	Safe

Contestant	StarStruck Alumna Mentor	Votes	Result
Pamela Prinster	LJ Reyes	83.0%	Bottom 3
Dani Porter	Chariz Solomon	82.8%	Eliminated
Lexi Gonzales	Yasmien Kurdi	93.6%	Highest Vote
Shayne Sava	Katrina Halili	90.3%	Safe

Week 12: Star Perya Musical

As the battle for the Final 4 begins, the StarStruck alumni were tasked to guide the remaining six finalists in a musical play under the direction of theater director Rem Zamora. The musical Star Perya, featuring various music hits, stars the Final 6, together with the premiere comedians Kiray Celis, Cai Cortez, Gladys Guevarra, Betong Sumaya, and Pekto.

Contestant	StarStruck Alumna Mentor	Votes	Result
Abdul Raman	Miguel Tanfelix	Unannounced	Unannounced
Kim de Leon	Mark Herras	Unannounced	Unannounced
Allen Ansay	Kris Bernal	96.4%	Highest Vote

Contestant	StarStruck Alumna Mentor	Votes	Result
Pamela Prinster	LJ Reyes	Unannounced	Unannounced
Lexi Gonzales	Yasmien Kurdi	92.4%	Highest Vote
Shayne Sava	Katrina Halili	Unannounced	Unannounced

Week 13: Heavy Drama Challenge

The Final 6 finalists prepare for their last challenge before The Final Judgment next week. They have to act out in a Heavy Drama Challenge with the setting of the aftermath of a fire tragedy. Directed by Don Michael Perez, the finalists portrayed their characters searching for their younger sibling (played by Yuan Francisco for the boys and Leanne Bautista for the girls). The final results for this week are separated on Saturday for the boys and Sunday for the girls.

Contestant	Votes	Result
Kim de Leon	90.9%	Final 4
Abdul Raman	84.2%	Eliminated
Allen Ansay	95.0%	Final 4

Contestant	Votes	Result
Pamela Prinster	84.3%	Eliminated
Lexi Gonzales	86.7%	Final 4
Shayne Sava	95.2%	Final 4

Week 14: The Final Judgment

On Saturday, the Final 4 survivors are interviewed by the StarStruck council who asked some of the hardest questions before performing their individual performances and face The Final Judgment. They portrayed their roles in their respective short films, both directed by Monti Parungao centering on youth. Allen and Kim portrayed brothers who are drug users, entitled "Pag-Uwi" while Lexi and Shayne portrayed in "Our Father" as grief-stricken sisters with mental disorders. The Ultimate Male and Female Survivors will each receive an exclusive management contract from GMA Network worth 5 million pesos, 1 million pesos cash, and a house and lot from Camella Homes.

Contestant	Votes	Result
Kim de Leon	97.4%	Ultimate Male Survivor
Allen Ansay	95.2%	First Prince

Contestant	Votes	Result
Lexi Gonzales	94.8%	First Princess
Shayne Sava	96.9%	Ultimate Female Survivor

== Final Judgment ==
The winner was announced on a two-hour TV special dubbed as StarStruck: The Final Judgment was held live on September 15, 2019, at the GMA Network Studio Annex (Studio 7) on the same event.

Hosted by Dingdong Dantes and Jennylyn Mercado with the Insider host, Kyline Alcantara. The opening number consisted of the council, formed by Heart Evangelista, Cherie Gil, and Jose Manalo, together with the ultimate final four performing American Authors's Best Day of My Life.

Before the female survivors sang Meghan Trainor's Better When I'm Dancin' with Jennylyn Mercado and the Graduates mentors with Yasmien Kurdi mentor of Lexi Gonzales, Katrina Halili mentor of Shayne Sava, Mark Herras mentor of Kim de Leon and Kris Bernal mentor of Allen Ansay. The next intermission features the council's sang Bill Medley's and Jennifer Warnes's (I’ve Had) The Time Of My Life before closing the opening performances with the dance performance of the final four and their graduates mentors to the StarStruck theme sung by Kyline Alcantara.

The avengers votes their choice of Ultimate Survivors before performing their dance number with Kyline Alcantara. The special guest, Alden Richards performed December Avenue's Kung Di Rin Lang Ikaw with Lexi Gonzales and Shayne Sava. After commercial break, Alden Richards performed his dance number with Kim de Leon and Allen Ansay. Before the final results, Aicelle Santos performed the StarStruck Journey song Fight For You while the final four and their mentors appears on stage followed by the avengers.

Announcement come, Kim de Leon of Balayan, Batangas is the Ultimate Male Survivor with a score of 97.4% and Shayne Sava of Binangonan, Rizal is the Ultimate Female Survivor with a score of 96.9% were proclaimed as the Ultimate Survivors, each of them received P1,000,000 pesos each plus and a five year an exclusive management contract from GMA Network worth P5,000,000 pesos each, and a house and lot from (Lessandra) Camella Homes.

While, Allen Ansay of Sagñay, Camarines Sur is the First Prince with a score of 95.2% and Lexi Gonzales of Sampaloc, Manila is the First Princess with a score of 94.8% were proclaimed as the Runners-up, each of them received P250,000 pesos each plus and an exclusive management contract from the network. The StarStruck Avengers (the losing contestants) also received an exclusive contract from the network. Also received the graduates mentors with Mark Herras, Yasmien Kurdi, Katrina Halili and Kris Bernal received their special awards for their mentorship to the final four.

== Signature dances ==
There are signature dances and songs made in each batch. With this batch, their signature dances and songs are:

- Hey Julie!
- Fight For You

== Elimination chart ==
Color key:

Male contestant
Female contestant
Unannounced
Semi-finalist
Final 14 and Final 4
Advanced
Highest Vote
Safe
Bottom Group
Eliminated
Did Not Participated
Wild Card and Judges Saved
Finalist
Runner-up
Winner

Results per public and council votes
Place	Contestant	Top 22 (Week 1-2)		Top 14 (Week 3-5)			Top 13 (Week 5)	Top 12 (Week 6)	Top 11 (Week 7)	Top 10 (Week 8-9)		Top 8 (Week 10)	Top 7 (Week 11)	Top 6 (Week 12-13)		Top 5 (Week 13)	Top 4 (Week 14)
Place	Contestant	6/15-16/19 ^{1}	6/22-23/19 ^{1}	6/30/19 ^{2}	7/7/19 ^{3}	7/13/19	7/14/19	7/21/19	7/28/19 ^{4}	8/4/19 ^{5}	8/11/19 ^{6}	8/18/19 ^{7}	8/25/19 ^{8}	9/1/19 ^{9}	9/7/19 ^{10}	9/8/19 ^{10}	9/15/19 ^{11}
1–4	Shayne Sava	Unannounced	Final 14	57.1%	81.8%	Unannounced	76.4%	79.7%	83.0%	81.9%	93.6%	88.2%	90.3%	Unannounced	Unannounced	Final 4	Ultimate Female Survivor
1–4	Kim de Leon	Final 14	Advanced	61.6%	94.2%	91.3%	Advanced	87.4%	85.5%	84.0%	99.0%	98.8%	97.5%	Unannounced	Final 4	Advanced	Ultimate Male Survivor
1–4	Lexi Gonzales	Unannounced	Final 14	50.9%	88.2%	Unannounced	77.8%	75.6%	81.6%	82.4%	Judges Saved	85.4%	93.6%	92.4%	Unannounced	Final 4	First Princess
1–4	Allen Ansay	Unannounced	Final 14	53.9%	77.1%	76.0%	Advanced	76.4%	77.9%	95.5%	90.5%	92.1%	91.3%	96.4%	Final 4	Advanced	First Prince
5	Pamela Prinster	Final 14	Advanced	56.2%	79.0%	Unannounced	87.1%	85.0%	84.1%	87.6%	89.3%	83.0%	83.0%	Unannounced	Unannounced	Eliminated	Avenger
6	Abdul Raman	Final 14	Advanced	59.9%	82.9%	86.4%	Advanced	77.9%	75.7%	86.6%	92.5%	83.5%	84.7%	Unannounced	Eliminated		Avenger
7	Dani Porter	Final 14	Advanced	53.8%	79.3%	Unannounced	74.2%	84.0%	81.2%	93.9%	97.5%	95.5%	Eliminated				Avenger
8	Jeremy Sabido	Unannounced	Final 14	60.1%	86.8%	81.7%	Advanced	85.9%	82.3%	83.5%	Judges Saved	Eliminated					Avenger
9–10	Radson Flores	Unannounced	Eliminated	Advanced	Wild Card	90.1%	Advanced	80.9%	94.8%	90.3%	Eliminated						Avenger
9–10	Ella Cristofani	Unannounced	Final 14	85.5%	89.3%	Unannounced	86.8%	83.4%	89.7%	79.3%	Eliminated						Avenger
11	Rere Madrid	Unannounced	Final 14	55.2%	79.9%	Unannounced	86.9%	82.5%	Eliminated								Avenger
12	Jerick Dolormente	Unannounced	Final 14	57.3%	82.1%	75.6%	Advanced	Eliminated									Avenger
13	Crystal Paras	Eliminated		Advanced	Wild Card	Unannounced	Eliminated										Avenger
14	Karl Aquino	Final 14	Advanced	50.0%	79.2%	Eliminated											Avenger
15–16	Gelo Alagban	Final 14	Advanced	56.6%	Eliminated												Avenger
15–16	Angelic Guzman	Final 14	Advanced	50.1%	Eliminated												Avenger
17	MJ Felizarta	Unannounced	Eliminated	Did Not Participate													Top 18
18-19	Maynard Fullido	Unannounced	Eliminated	Advanced	Eliminated												Top 18
18-19	Janelle Lewis	Unannounced	Eliminated	Advanced	Eliminated												Top 18
20–21	Marc David	Eliminated		Advanced	Eliminated												Top 22
20–21	Kyle Lucasan	Eliminated		Advanced	Eliminated												Top 22
22	Nahuel Prieto	Eliminated		Did Not Participated													Top 22

=== Notes ===
1. In this season, a new stage call the Final Audition was introduced wherein the Top 22 hopefuls were paired by twos or threes, according to their performances from previous stages. A hopeful will be given the chance to showcase his or her chosen talent, aside from an acting piece through a form of a video clip that will later be shown. The council will then pick one or two hopefuls that will qualify of the next round and will be included in the show's final fourteen. The first week (Saturday and Sunday) July 15–16, 2019 and second week (Saturday and Sunday) July 22–23, 2019.
2. It was a non-elimination week. No bottom group was announced. Instead, Karl Aquino who got the lowest combined scores from the audience and judges was called to join Jerick Dolormente and Lexi Gonzales who were asked to remain on stage after their performance. The season introduces a new twist: The Second Chance Challenge when the Top 22 hopefuls (minus Felizarta and Prieto) perform a scene by pairs, one from each gender, for an opportunity to enter the Final 14 after the elimination of two of the original fourteen finalists from each gender next week.
3. Radson Flores and Crystal Paras emerged in the Ultimate Final 14, and were both reinstated after the eliminations of Gelo Alagban and Angelic Guzman.
4. Rere Madrid was sent to The Danger Seat after receiving the lowest number of votes from the public and the council. She was automatically eliminated after the final results are revealed.
5. The Last Chance Challenge twist was introduced. Jeremy Sabido and Ella Cristofani, who got the lowest combined scores this week will be competing against next week's bottom two performers for a spot in the Final 8. From it, the StarStruck council will then choose two hopefuls (one per gender) to advance in the competition.
6. Jeremy Sabido won the Last Chance Challenge after beating Radson Flores to reinstate in the competition. Lexi Gonzales remained in the Top 8 after winning the Last Chance Challenge over Ella Cristofani who was now eliminated along with Radson Flores.
7. Pamela Prinster was sent to The Danger Seat after receiving the lowest number of votes from the public and the council but was automatically saved after Jeremy Sabido was re-eliminated on the final live results on Sunday.
8. Dani Porter was sent to The Danger Seat after receiving the lowest number of votes from the public and the council before her elimination during the final Sunday live results.
9. It was a non-elimination week. Scores this week will be combined with next week's final artists test scores which will determine the Ultimate Final 4. Only the highest combined scores were revealed.
10. The Ultimate Final 4 was chosen separately on Saturday for the boys and Sunday for the girls. Abdul Raman was eliminated on September 7, 2019, followed by Pamela Prinster on September 8, 2019.
11. In the final judgment night, Shayne Sava and Kim de Leon were proclaimed as the Ultimate Survivors.
