= Venlo =

City and municipality in Limburg, Netherlands

- City and municipality
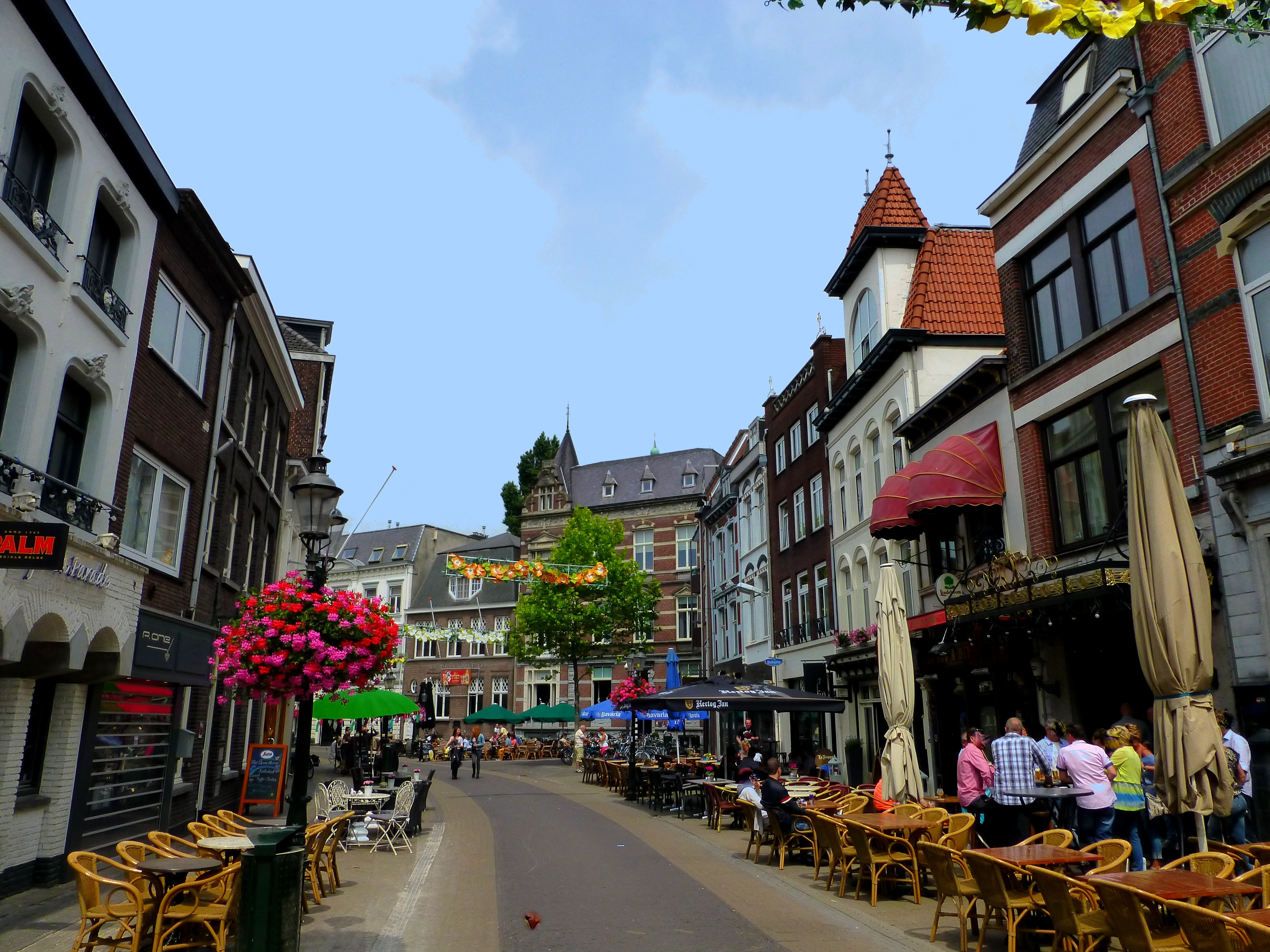
- Venlo city centre

- Flag Coat of arms

- Location in Limburg

- Location within the Netherlands Location within Europe
- Coordinates: 51°22′N 6°10′E
- Country: Netherlands
- Province: Limburg

Government
  - Body: Municipal council
  - Mayor: Antoin Scholten (VVD)

Area
  - Total: 128.99 km^{2} (49.80 sq mi)
  - Land: 124.25 km^{2} (47.97 sq mi)
  - Water: 4.74 km^{2} (1.83 sq mi)
- Elevation: 21 m (69 ft)

Population (January 2021)
  - Total: 101,988
  - Density: 821/km^{2} (2,130/sq mi)
- Demonym(s): Venloër, Venlonaar, Venloënaar, Venlonaer
- Time zone: UTC+1 (CET)
  - Summer (DST): UTC+2 (CEST)
- Postcode: 5900–5951
- Area code: 077
- Website: venlo.nl

Venlo (Dutch pronunciation: [ˈvɛnloː]) is a city and municipality in southeastern Netherlands, close to the border with Germany. It is situated in the province of Limburg. The municipality of Venlo had 101,578 inhabitants in January 2019.

== History ==
=== Early history ===
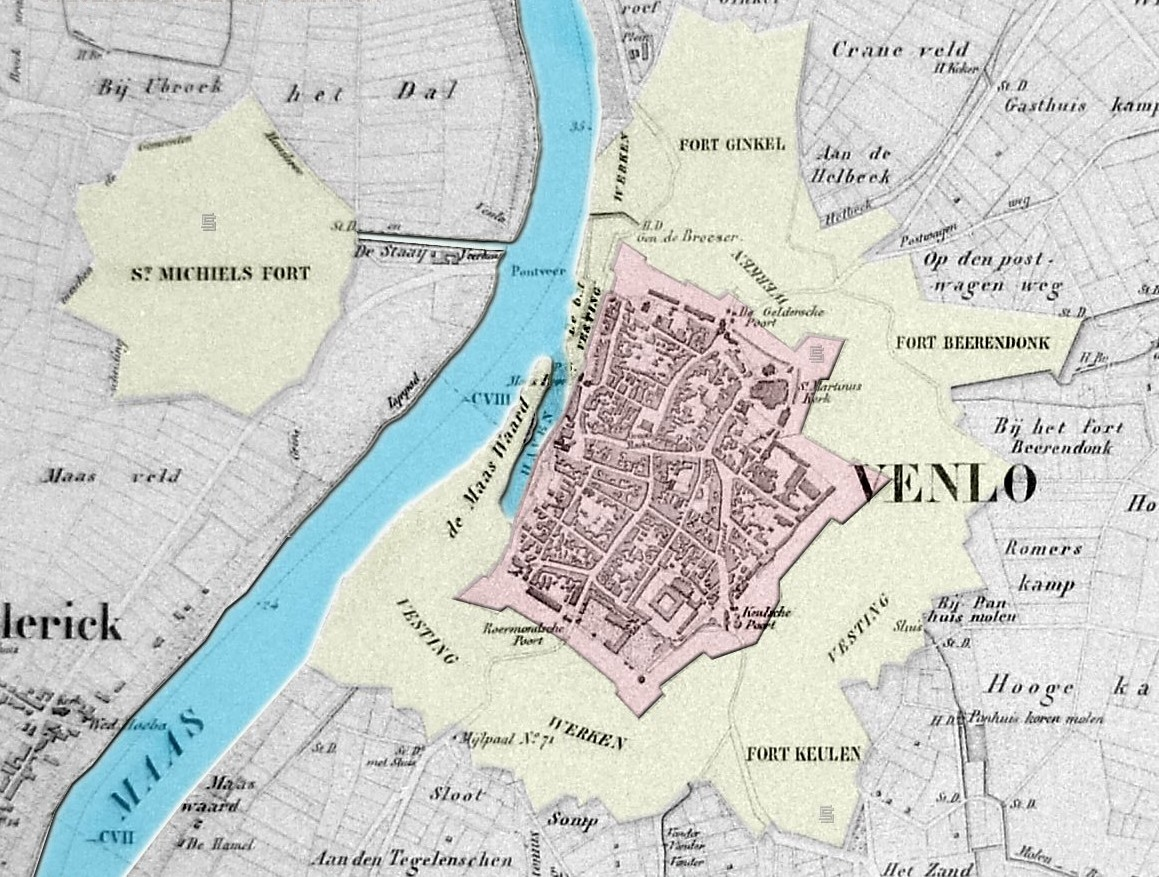
Map c. 1850

Roman and Celtic coins have been found in Venlo; it was speculated to have been the settlement known as Sablones on the Roman road connecting Maastricht with Xanten, although what little evidence there is goes against this. Blerick, on the west bank, was known as Blariacum.

Documents from the 9th century mention Venlo as a trade post; it developed into one of the more important ones in the Meuse-Rhine area, receiving city rights in 1343, and becoming a member of the Hanseatic League in 1375.

Because of its strategic importance, the city of Venlo was besieged several times. The most significant siege was that of 1702, carried on by Menno van Coehoorn. Consequently, Venlo was incorporated into the Generaliteitslanden of the United Provinces at the Treaty of 1713. After the Napoleonic Wars it became part of the United Kingdom of the Netherlands.

At the start of the Belgian Revolution of 1830 Venlo like most of the province Limburg chose the side of the Belgian rebels, in the following of Belgium's de facto independence it was under Belgian rule and at the time their northernmost fortress.

In 1839, King William I signed the Treaty of London recognising the independence of Belgium. One of the terms in the treaty was that the Belgians had to relinquish parts of Limburg including Venlo to the Dutch and Venlo became parts of the Netherlands.

In 1839–1866 Venlo was not a part of German Confederation, completely surrounded by its territory.

=== World War II ===
On 9 November 1939, two British Intelligence Service agents were kidnapped by the Sicherheitsdienst in what became known as the Venlo Incident. The incident was used by the Nazis to link Great Britain to Georg Elser's failed assassination of Hitler at the Bürgerbräukeller the day before and to justify their later invasion of the Netherlands, a neutral country, on 10 May 1940.

Venlo had both a road and a railway bridge over the Meuse (Dutch: Maas). The city was severely damaged by bombing raids (13 October – 19 November 1944) on the bridges at the end of the war. Allied forces made 13 attempts to destroy the bridges to cut the German supply lines and block a retreat of the German army across the river. These failed, and it was the retreating German troops who in the end blew up the bridges in an attempt to stop the allied advance. Allied forces liberated Venlo from the east, from inside Germany itself.

About 300 people were killed due to those raids. The raids also cost Venlo a major part of its historical buildings. However, some old buildings, such as the city hall (the 'Stadhuis') and the 'Römer' house, survived the war relatively unscathed.

Before the war, Venlo had a small Jewish community. In 1930 there were 86 Jewish people living there. In the next decade this number rose to about 248, because German Jews were trying to evade the discriminatory laws and growing hate in Germany. 6 years after the end of The Holocaust and the first wave of Jewish immigration to Israel there were 32 Jewish people left in Venlo.

=== Post-Second World War era ===
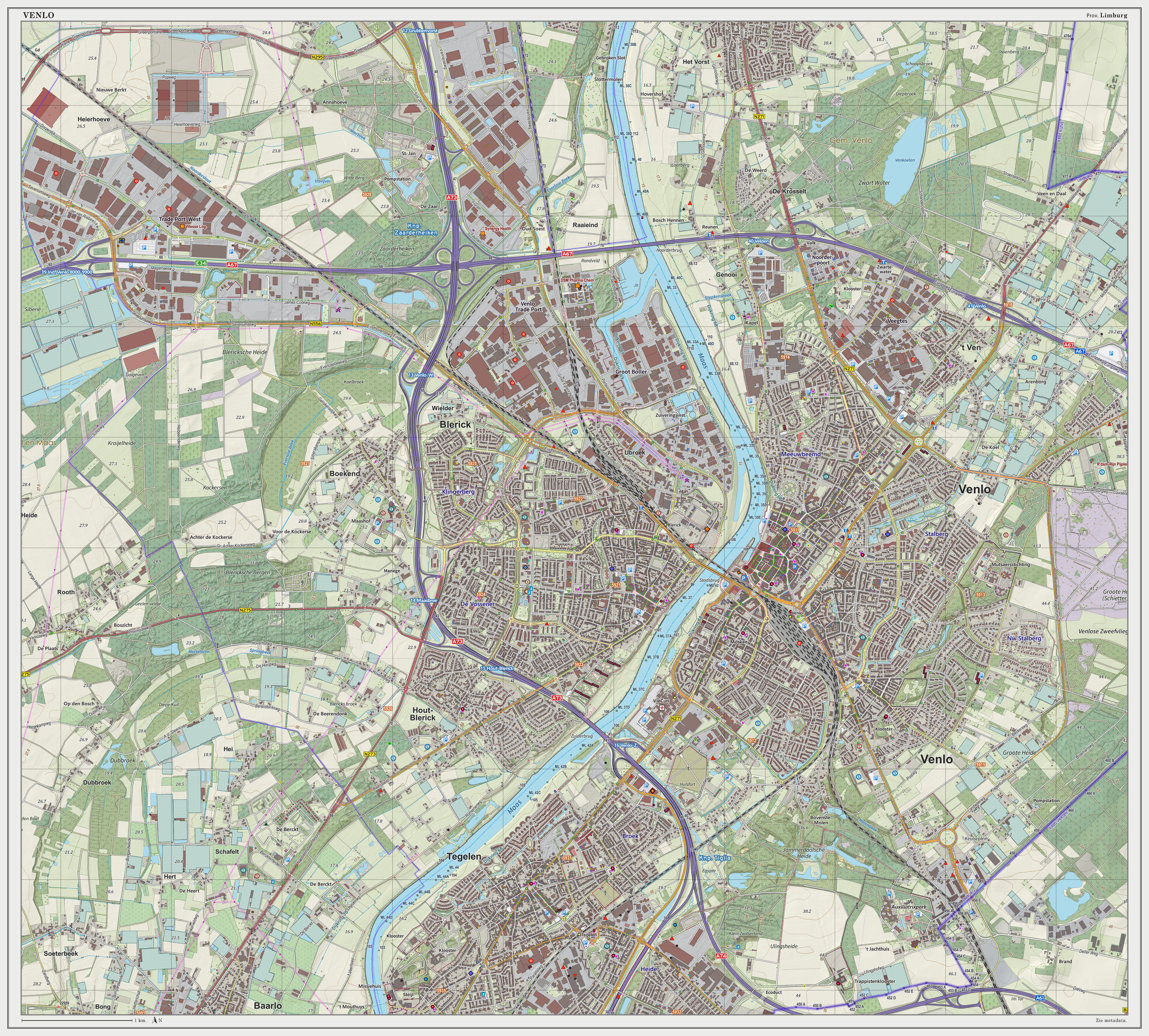
Topographic map of the city of Venlo, as of March 2014

By the late 1990s, drug-related nuisance had become a problem in the centre of Venlo. National and municipal officials launched the Q-4 Project and Tango initiatives that, amongst other measures, included moving the town's largest coffeeshops to the outskirts, where they continue to do business, while the city centre was freed from disturbances.

In 2001, the municipalities of Belfeld and Tegelen were merged into the municipality of Venlo. Tegelen was originally part of the Duchy of Jülich centuries ago, whereas Venlo has a past in the Duchy of Guelders. On 1 January 2010, the municipality of Arcen en Velden, was merged into the municipality of Venlo.

In 2003 Venlo was awarded the title "Greenest city of Europe". Venlo was the host of Floriade 2012, the world's largest horticultural exhibition.

In 2013, Venlo won the prestigious 'Best City Centre of the Netherlands' award. It amazed the jury by all the investments which have been made in the last couple of years in the Maas Boulevard, the railway station, the tunnel in the centre and the Maas bridge.

== Culture ==
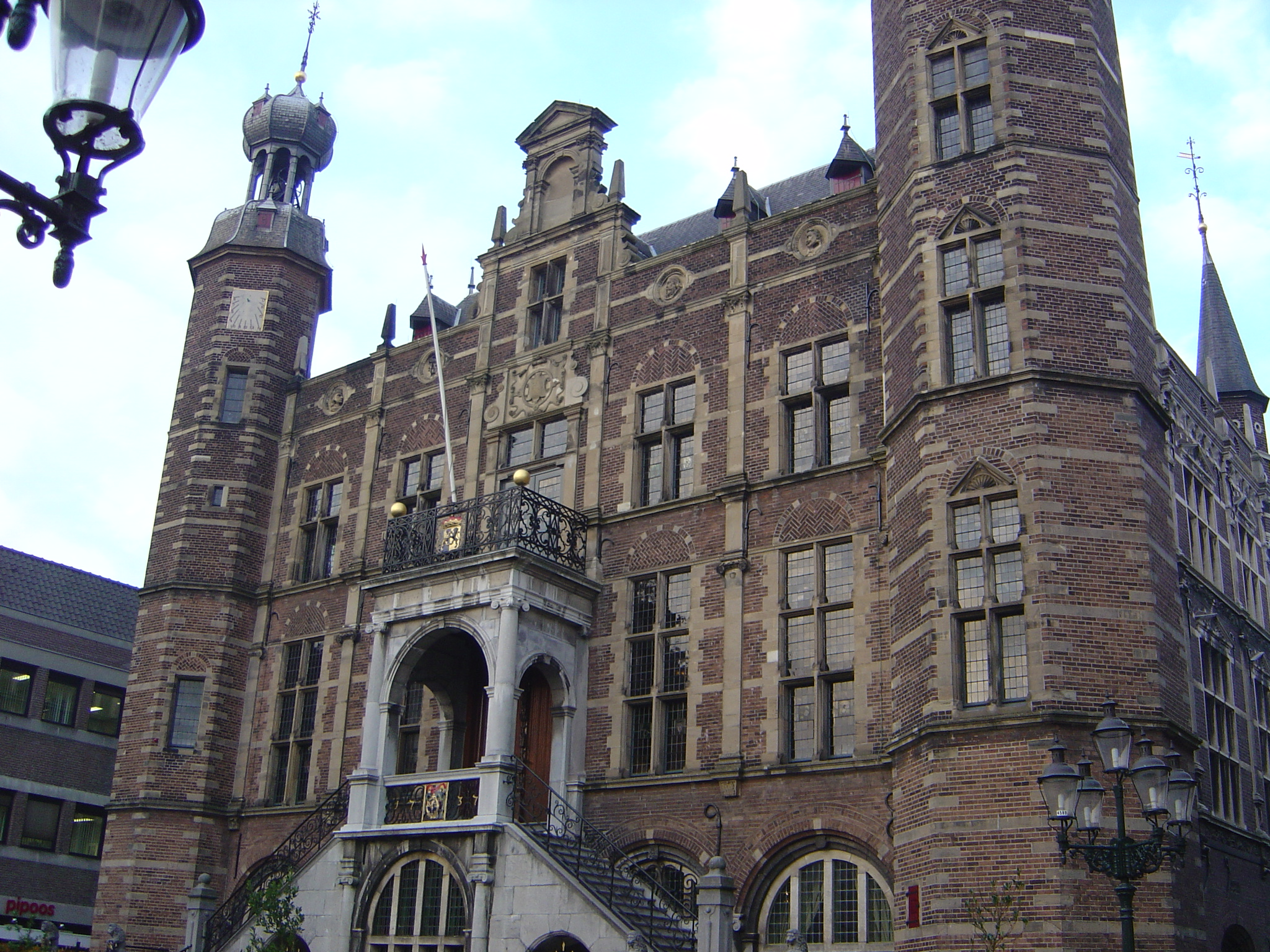
City hall of Venlo

- Theatre "De Maaspoort"
- Limburg Museum and Art Museum "Museum van Bommel van Dam"
- Venlo Police Museum
- Pop venue Grenswerk (formerly Perron 55)
- Major annual cultural events
  - Carnival called "Vastelaovend" in February/March (Six weeks before Easter)
  - Summer park festivities called "Zomerparkfeest" in August held in and around the main park of Venlo, a four-day podium for a broad audience, including live music, film, dance, art etc.

== Education ==
Venlo, being a city with a 100,000-plus population, is served by a large number of schools both at primary and secondary education levels. In addition, Venlo is a higher-education hub within the southern Netherlands, with several institutes of higher education.

Venlo hosts three institutes of higher education:

- Fontys University of Applied Sciences (International Campus Venlo)
- HAS University of Applied Sciences (Venlo branch)
- Maastricht University Campus Venlo (University College Venlo affiliated to Maastricht University)

== Transport ==
Venlo is connected to Germany by two motorways (Bundesautobahn 40 and Bundesautobahn 61), which connect to Düsseldorf, Duisburg, Cologne and the Ruhr area within one hour.

Venlo railway station is a junction station. It provides regular connections to the Dutch cities of Eindhoven, Roermond and Nijmegen. Furthermore, it provides regular international connections to Germany, via Kaldenkirchen (the first stop in Germany), Viersen and Mönchengladbach to Düsseldorf and Hamm.

The nearest airports to Venlo are Weeze Airport, located 32.2 km (20 mi) north and Düsseldorf Airport, located 62 km (39 mi) south east of the city. Amsterdam's Schiphol Airport is approximately 190 km (118 mi) north west of Venlo. NS operates direct train services between Venlo and Schiphol.

== Sports ==
VVV-Venlo is a century-old football club that plays in De Koel Stadium. Founded on 7 February 1903, it is one of the first professional football clubs in the Netherlands. In recent years it has been a yo-yo club, winning the Eerste Divisie in 2009 and 2017 and being promoted to the highest Dutch professional football league, the Eredivisie, as a result.

== Geography ==
=== Climate ===
Climate data for Arcen, Netherlands (extremes 1981-2010)
Month	Jan	Feb	Mar	Apr	May	Jun	Jul	Aug	Sep	Oct	Nov	Dec	Year
Record high °C (°F)	15.9 (60.6)	17.4 (63.3)	24.3 (75.7)	28.7 (83.7)	31.8 (89.2)	34.7 (94.5)	38.2 (100.8)	37.8 (100.0)	32.5 (90.5)	25.9 (78.6)	20.2 (68.4)	15.8 (60.4)	38.2 (100.8)
Mean daily maximum °C (°F)	5.3 (41.5)	6.4 (43.5)	10.5 (50.9)	14.8 (58.6)	19.1 (66.4)	21.7 (71.1)	24.1 (75.4)	23.6 (74.5)	19.7 (67.5)	14.9 (58.8)	9.4 (48.9)	5.8 (42.4)	14.6 (58.3)
Daily mean °C (°F)	2.7 (36.9)	3.0 (37.4)	6.2 (43.2)	9.4 (48.9)	13.6 (56.5)	16.1 (61.0)	18.4 (65.1)	17.7 (63.9)	14.4 (57.9)	10.6 (51.1)	6.3 (43.3)	3.3 (37.9)	10.1 (50.3)
Mean daily minimum °C (°F)	−0.2 (31.6)	−0.2 (31.6)	2.1 (35.8)	4.0 (39.2)	7.9 (46.2)	10.4 (50.7)	12.7 (54.9)	12.1 (53.8)	9.7 (49.5)	6.7 (44.1)	3.3 (37.9)	0.7 (33.3)	5.8 (42.4)
Record low °C (°F)	−19.9 (−3.8)	−15.2 (4.6)	−10.0 (14.0)	−6.4 (20.5)	−1.1 (30.0)	0.6 (33.1)	3.9 (39.0)	2.7 (36.9)	0.4 (32.7)	−6.0 (21.2)	−8.8 (16.2)	−14.3 (6.3)	−19.9 (−3.8)
Source: Royal Netherlands Meteorological Institute (1981–2010 normals, snowy days normals for 1971–2000)

== Economy and infrastructure ==
The headquarters of multinational printing-equipment firm Océ, today a part of the Japanese firm Canon, is located in Venlo, as is the headquarters of Cimpress, parent company of the Vistaprint brand. Also, the European headquarters of one of the world's largest direct selling companies Amway and the American office supply retailing company Office Depot are located in the city of Venlo. In 2017 also the international onlineshop vidaXL moved its headquarters and warehouse to Venlo.

Greenport Venlo is one of designated five Greenports in the Netherlands. It is the second largest concentration of horticulture in the Netherlands. Seen in conjunction with the neighbouring German region of Niederrhein (Lower Rhine), Greenport Venlo is even the largest in Europe. Together, the Greenport area Venlo and the agro business area "Lower Rhine" in Germany form a region where more than 30 million of people live. This region is a unique and vital international network of business, research, universities and politics. The cooperation revolves around stimulating innovation, creating an attractive working and living environment and integral regional development. The network offers broad chances and future possibilities to analyse, use and further develop the "green market", thus food, fresh and logistics markets. The aim is to provide an impulse for the economy of the region of North Limburg.

== International relations ==
Venlo is twinned with:

Gorizia, Italy	Klagenfurt, Austria	Krefeld, Germany	Kropyvnytskyi, Ukraine

== Notable residents ==
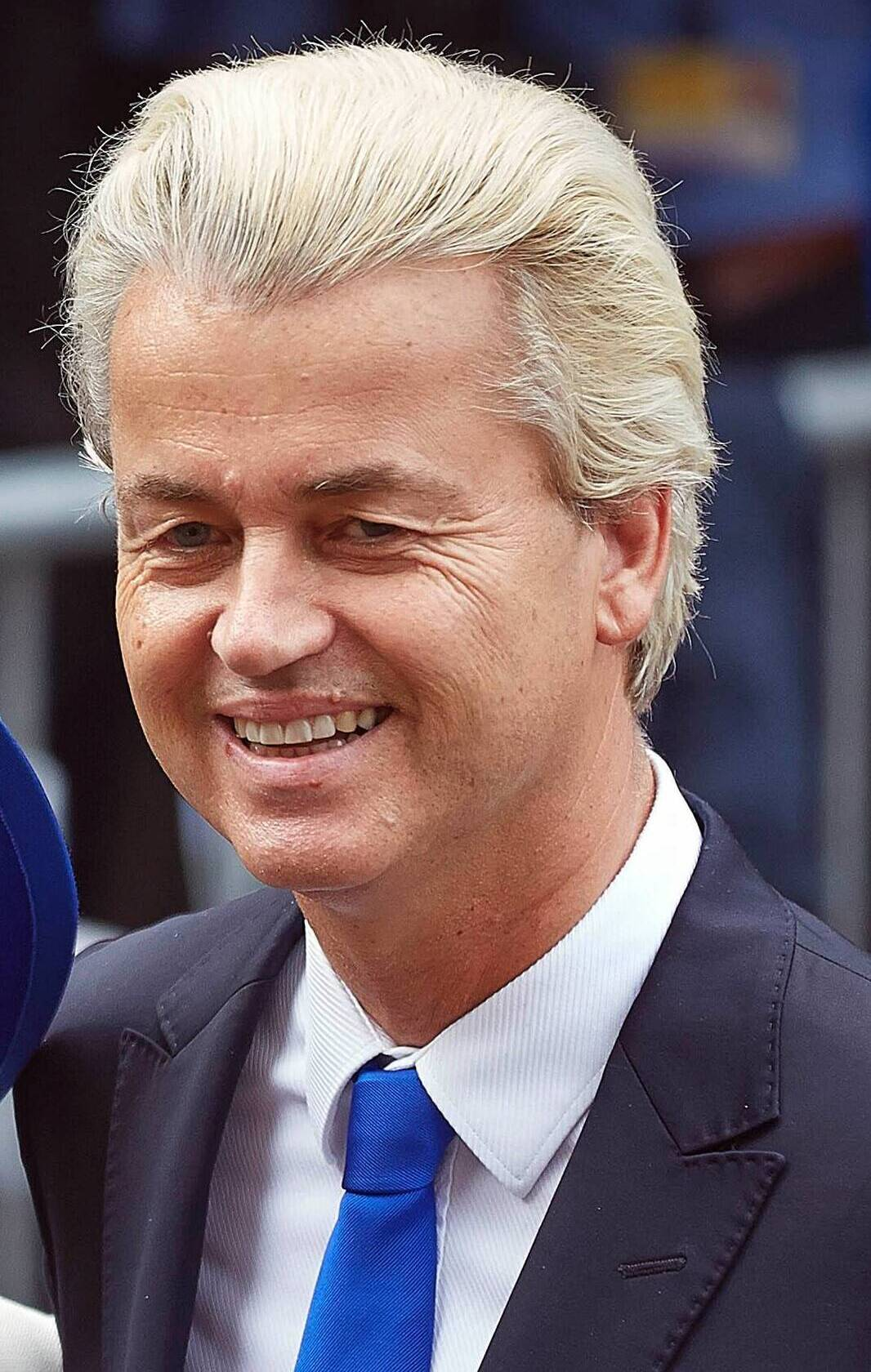
Geert Wilders, 2014

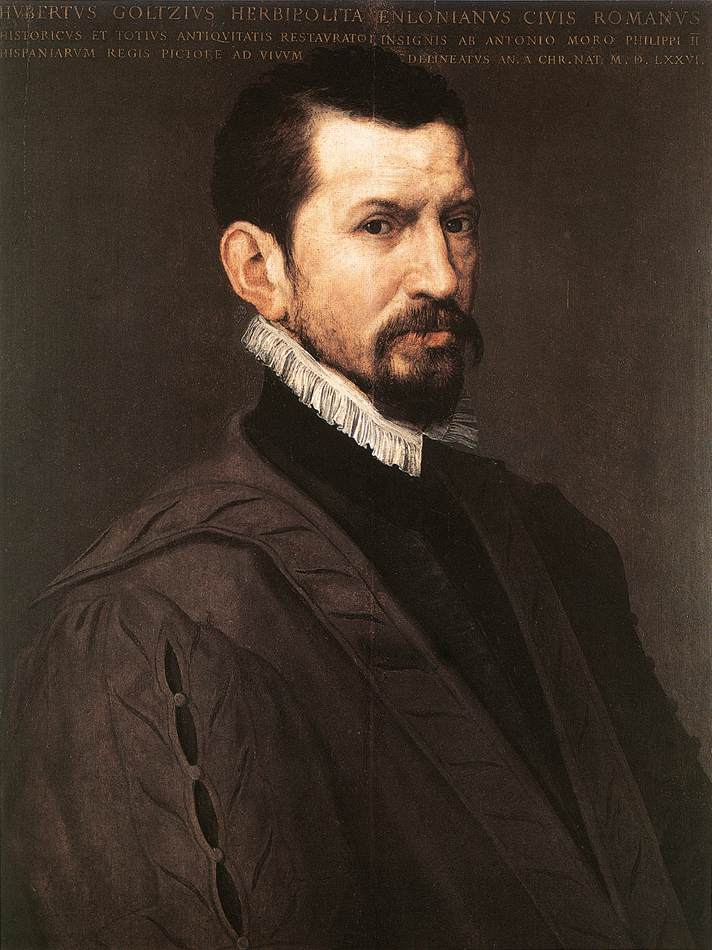
Hubert Goltzius, 1574

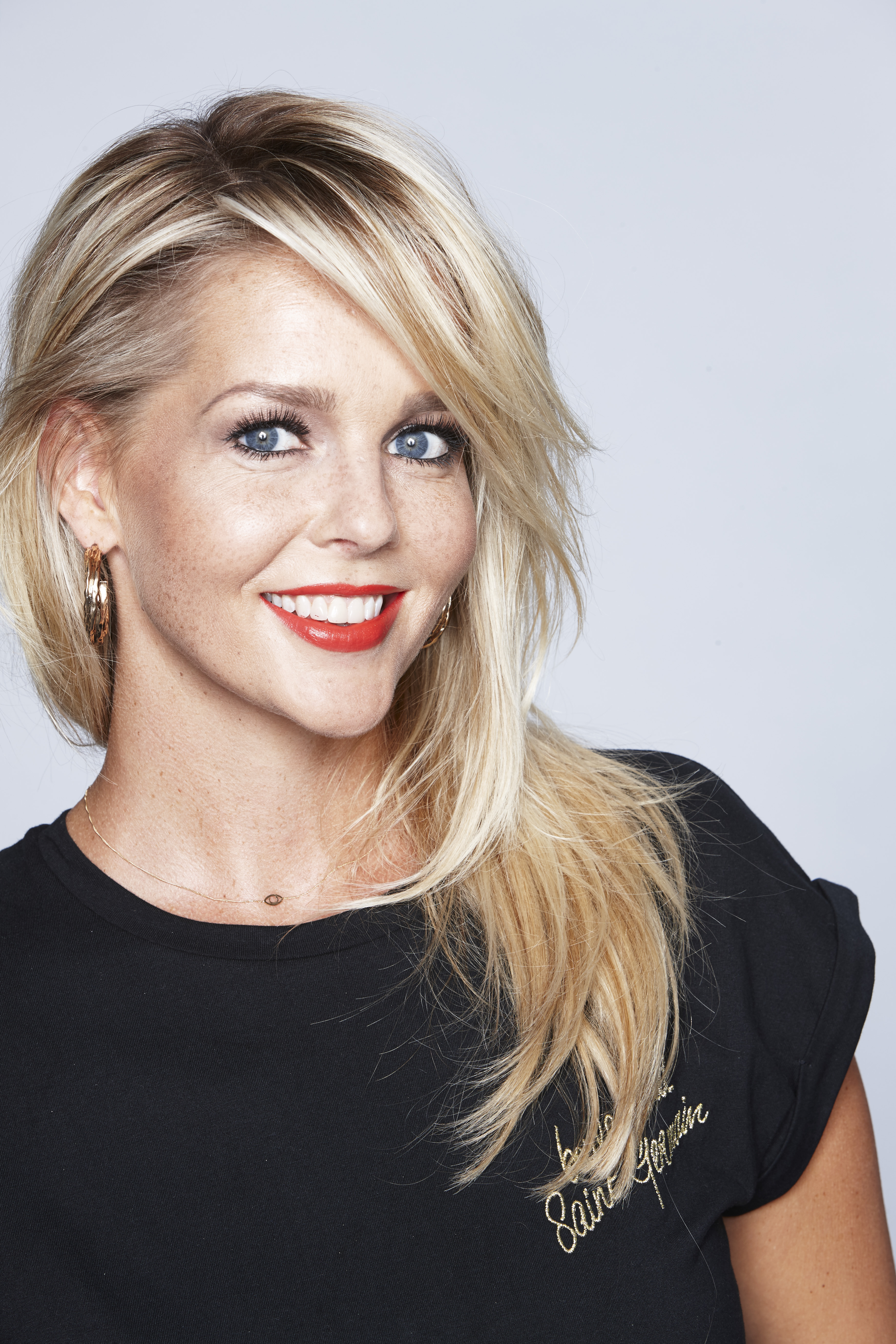
Chantal Janzen, 2016

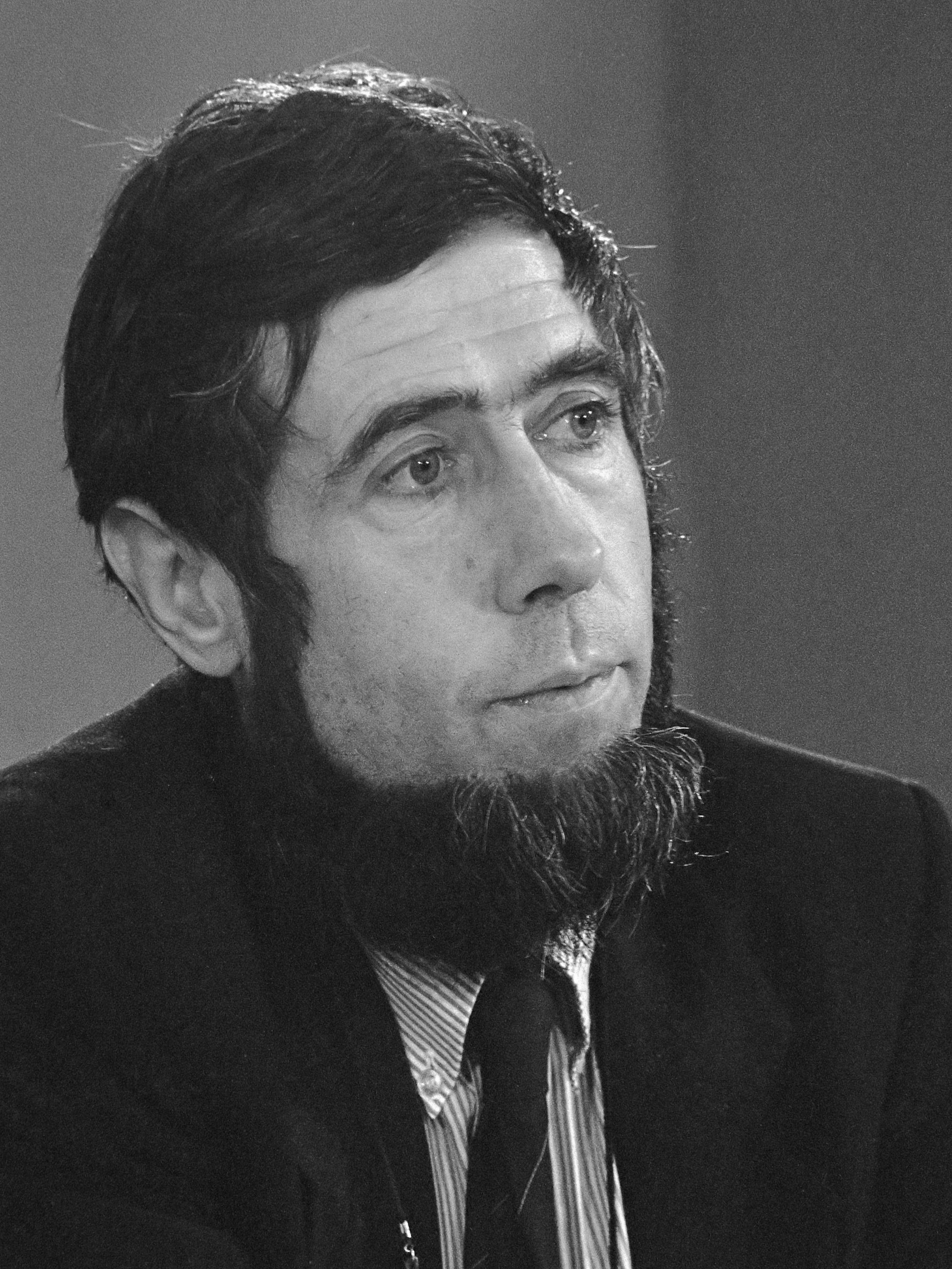
Chriet Titulaer, 1984

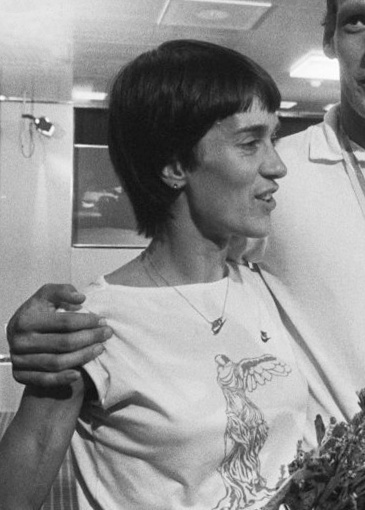
Carla Beurskens, 1982

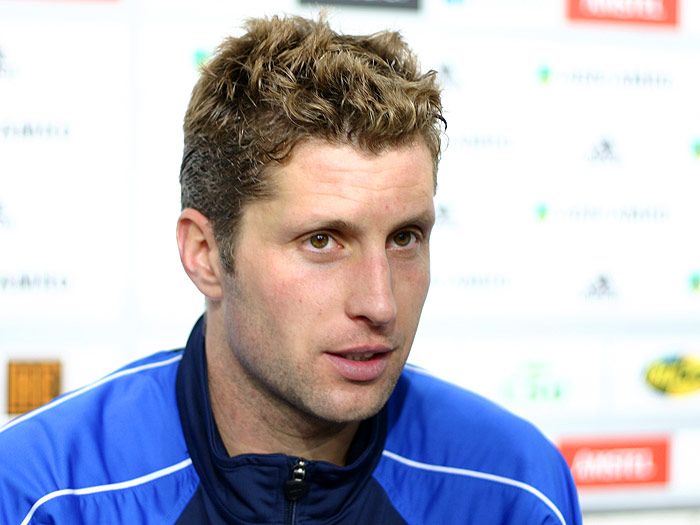
Rick Hoogendorp, 2006

=== Public service ===
- Gertruid Bolwater (died 1511), legendary Dutch folklore heroine, the Defender of Venlo
- Erycius Puteanus (1574–1646), humanist and philologist.
- General Sir Colin Halkett (1774–1856), a British Army officer & Lieutenant Governor of Jersey.
- Henri Alexis Brialmont (1821–1903), Dutch-born Belgian military engineer.
- Johan van Lom (1465–1538 or 1539), politician and philanthropist
- Willem Hubert Nolens (1860–1931), politician and Roman Catholic priest
- Charles van Rooy (1912–1996), politician, Mayor of Venlo 1952–1957
- Teun van Dijck (born 1963), politician and saxophonist, restaurateur and civil servant
- Geert Wilders (born 1963), politician, parliament member since 1998, leader of the PVV
- Jolande Sap (born 1963), politician and former educator and civil servant
- Mark Verheijen (born 1976), politician

=== Arts ===
- Hubert Goltzius (1526–1583), Renaissance painter, engraver and printer
- Gerrit Gerritsz Cuyp (c. 1565–1644), Dutch Golden Age painter and master glazier
- Jan van Cleve (III) (1646–1716), Flemish painter of altarpieces and allegorical scenes
- Josephus Andreas Fodor (1751–1828), violinist and composer of the Classical era
- Carel Anton Fodor (1768–1846), pianist, conductor and composer
- André van den Heuvel (1927 in Tegelen–2016), actor
- Paul Cox (1940–2016), Dutch-Australian filmmaker and director
- Marie-Thérèse Schins (born 1943), German-Dutch journalist, painter and writer
- Ben Verbong (born 1949 in Tegelen), film director and screenwriter
- Geert Lap (1951–2017), ceramist and clay minimalist
- Huub Stapel (born 1954 in Tegelen), actor
- Ted Noten (born 1956 in Tegelen), conceptual artist
- Frank Scheffer (born 1956), cinematographer and producer of documentary film
- James Intveld (born 1959), American musician, singer, songwriter, actor and film director
- Will Sanders (born 1965), classical horn player, conductor and music school professor
- Pieter Kuijpers (born 1968 in Tegelen), film director, producer and screenwriter
- Glenn Corneille (1970–2005), jazz pianist
- Saskia Linssen (born 1970), model and actress, Playboy Playmate of the Month, June 1991
- Ronald Goedemondt (born 1975 in Tegelen), comedian
- Chantal Janzen (born 1979 in Tegelen), actress, singer and TV presenter
- Boris Titulaer (born 1980), soul singer-songwriter, winner of the second season of the Dutch talent show Idols
- Lotte Verbeek (born 1982), actress, model and dancer

=== Science & business ===
- Matthieu Gerard Jaques Marie Kerbosch (1880–1973), pharmacist and botanist
- André Hellegers (1926–1979), bioethicist and founder of the Kennedy Institute of Ethics
- Cor Herkströter (1937–2026), former chairman of Royal Dutch Shell and the ING Group
- Chriet Titulaer (1943–2017), astronomer and TV personality
- Jo van Nunen (1945–2010), engineer and professor of logistics
- Ernst Homburg (born 1952), chemist and historian
- Evert Dudok (born 1959), President of EADS Astrium Space Transportation

=== Sport ===
- Bart Carlier (1929–2017), football player with over 340 club caps
- Jan Klaassens (1931–1983), football player with 707 club caps and 57 national caps
- Jeu Sprengers (1938 in Tegelen – 2008), chairman of the Royal Dutch Football Association (KNVB) 2002 to 2008
- Harry Heijnen (1940–2015), football player with over 400 club caps
- Theo van Vroonhoven (born 1940), field hockey player, competed at the 1960, the 1964 and the 1968 Summer Olympics
- Carla Beurskens (born 1952 in Tegelen), prominent long-distance runner
- Jan Versleijen (born 1955), professional football coach, last managed in South Africa
- Paul van der Sterren (born 1956), chess grandmaster
- Jos Luhukay (born 1963), football coach and former player
- Stan Valckx (born 1963 in Arcen en Velden), former professional footballer with 435 club caps
- David Strijbos (born 1967), former motocross F.I.M. world champion
- Inge Leurs (born 1975), former cricketer
- Rick Hoogendorp (born 1975), former football striker with 439 club caps
- Bernard Hofstede (born 1980 in Tegelen), footballer with 380 club caps
- Sjors Verdellen (born 1981 in Tegelen), former professional footballer with 394 club caps
- Jens Janse (born 1986), footballer with 220 club caps
- Angela Steenbakkers (born 1994), handballer with the Dutch national team
- Thierry Vermeulen (born 2002), racing driver
