= QI (Dutch game show) =

- Title card
- Genre: Comedy
- Presented by: Arthur Japin
- Starring: Thomas van Luyn; Guest panellists
- Country of origin: Netherlands
- No. of series: 1
- No. of episodes: 6

Production
- Producer: Monica Galer
- Running time: 30 minutes
- Production companies: VARA Production; Blue Circle

Original release
- Network: VARA
- Release: 27 December 2008 – 31 January 2009

Related
- QI (UK); Intresseklubben (Swedish); QI (Czech version)

QI is a Dutch panel show, which aired on the television network VARA from December 2008, based on the QI UK format. The show only lasted the first season with six episodes broadcast, and ended on 31 January 2009. The show was hosted by Arthur Japin, with Thomas van Luyn as a permanent panelist.

== Season one ==
Each episode in the season instead have different themes. Six episodes were broadcast on TV and the show was not renewed for a second series.

Episode	Title (English translation)	Contestants	Winner/s	Original Broadcast
1	Zintuigen (Senses)	Johan Glans; Ronald Goedemondt; Thomas van Luyn	Diederik van Vleuten	27 December 2008
2	Oorlog (War)	Diederik van Vleuten; Lenette van Dongen; Richard Groenendijk	Thomas van Luyn	3 January 2009
3	Liefde en lust (Love and Lust)	Ronald Goedemondt; Claudia de Breij; Thomas van Luyn	Silvester Zwaneveld	10 January 2009
4	Huis (Home)	Wim Helsen; Dolf Jansen; Thomas van Luyn	Sara Kroos	17 January 2009
5	Geloof (Faith)	Diederik van Vleuten; Ronald Goedemondt; Claudia de Breij	Thomas van Luyn	24 January 2009
6	Geld (Money)	Thomas Acda; Thomas van Luyn	Sara Kroos; Silvester Zwaneveld	31 January 2009
