= Peter P. J. Driessen =

Dutch environmental governance scholar

Peter Driessen
- Born: 4 April 1959 (age 67); Tegelen, Netherlands
- Education: Catholic University of Nijmegen (PhD, 1990)
- Known for: Modes of environmental governance; flood risk governance; Knowledge for Climate
- Scientific career
- Fields: Environmental governance, environmental policy, climate change adaptation, water governance, science–policy interactions
- Workplaces: Utrecht University
- Thesis: Landinrichting gewogen (1990)
- Doctoral advisor: K. Bouwer, H. J. M. Goverde

Peter P. J. Driessen (born 4 April 1959) is a Dutch social scientist and emeritus professor of environmental governance at the Copernicus Institute of Sustainable Development of Utrecht University. His research deals with how governments, businesses and citizens share responsibilities for the solution of environmental problems. It covers flood risk governance, water quality management, climate adaptation policy, sustainable urban development and the interaction between science and policy. From 2008 to 2014 he was one of the three directors of the Dutch national research programme Knowledge for Climate, and from 2012 to 2016 he coordinated the European research project STAR-FLOOD on flood risk governance.

== Education ==
Driessen was born in Tegelen on 4 April 1959. He studied human geography and urban and regional planning at the Catholic University of Nijmegen, now Radboud University. He obtained his doctorate in policy sciences there on 2 May 1990 with a dissertation on land consolidation policy, Landinrichting gewogen, which examined how environmental, nature and landscape interests were weighed in that policy. His supervisors were K. Bouwer and H. J. M. Goverde.

== Career ==
Driessen joined Utrecht University in 1990 and became an associate professor there in 1996. In 2002 he became head of the department of innovation and environmental sciences. He was appointed full professor in June 2004; his inaugural lecture, Sturen op kwaliteit (2005), dealt with changing ambitions and strategies in Dutch environmental and spatial policy. He later led the environmental governance group of the Copernicus Institute of Sustainable Development and served as vice-dean of the Faculty of Geosciences, including a short period as acting dean. He retired in April 2026 with a valedictory lecture on governing sustainable development as a "wicked problem".

=== Knowledge for climate ===
From 2008 to 2014 Driessen was one of the three directors of Knowledge for Climate (Kennis voor Klimaat), a Dutch national research programme on climate change adaptation. He was responsible for the social sciences part of the programme, alongside Pier Vellinga for the natural sciences and Kees van Deelen as managing director. The national government gave the programme an initial budget of 50 million euros from its economic structure fund, and participating authorities, businesses and research institutes added another 30 million euros.

The programme aimed to prepare the Netherlands for climate change by developing knowledge for adaptation strategies. Research was organised in eight themes, among them flood risk management, fresh water supply, climate-proof cities and the governance of adaptation. Regional adaptation strategies were developed with stakeholders in eight "hotspots", vulnerable areas such as the major rivers, the Rotterdam region, Mainport Schiphol and the Wadden Sea. The programme was evaluated by the Rathenau Institute in 2011 and 2015.

=== STAR-FLOOD ===
Driessen coordinated STAR-FLOOD (Strengthening and Redesigning European Flood Risk Practices Towards Appropriate and Resilient Flood Risk Governance Arrangements), a project funded under the EU's Seventh Framework Programme that ran from October 2012 to March 2016. It brought together ten partners from six countries and compared flood risk governance in Belgium, England, France, the Netherlands, Poland and Sweden. Work from the project argued that countries should diversify their flood risk strategies rather than rely on flood defences alone, a point Driessen and colleagues also made in a 2018 opinion piece in the Proceedings of the National Academy of Sciences.

== Research ==
Driessen's most cited work develops ways to analyse and evaluate "modes of environmental governance": the different arrangements in which state, market and civil society actors steer environmental policy. A 2012 article in Environmental Policy and Governance set out a conceptual framework for studying shifts between such modes, and a 2013 article in the Journal of Environmental Policy & Planning applied a related approach to governing towards sustainability. With colleagues he also wrote on public participation in environmental impact assessment, on the effectiveness of strategic environmental assessment and on ecolabels. His later work on climate adaptation and water governance looked at how responsibilities shift between governments and citizens.

He has also published on the interface between science and policy, asking under which conditions research can help to solve sustainability problems and influence policy practice. A 2014 article in the Journal of Environmental Assessment Policy and Management proposed a research agenda on productive science–policy interfaces, and a 2024 article in Environmental Science & Policy examined how researchers in transdisciplinary sustainability projects try to make their knowledge credible, salient and legitimate.

Scopus lists 178 of his publications with more than 8,000 citations and an h-index of 52; Google Scholar, which also counts citations in books and reports, gives more than 15,000 citations and an h-index of 67.

He co-edited Greening Society (2002) with Pieter Glasbergen, on the shift towards a more participatory environmental policy, and the Dutch textbook Milieubeleid: analyse en perspectief (2007) with Pieter Leroy.

== Advisory roles ==
Driessen was a member of the Netherlands Commission for Environmental Assessment (Commissie voor de milieu-effectrapportage) and was reappointed to it in 1996 and 2001. In 2005 he was appointed to the Advisory Committee on Water Management Legislation (Commissie van advies inzake de waterstaatswetgeving), which advised the government and parliament on water legislation. He was still a member in 2013, when a law abolished the committee. From 2019 to 2022 he was a member of the Waarderingskamer, a body established under the Dutch property valuation act.

He has served on the European Research Council's SH7 evaluation panel for Starting Grants, on the scientific advisory board of the Centre for Sustainability Studies at Lund University and on the advisory board of the climate change research area of the University of Graz. He is a member of the lead faculty of the Earth System Governance Project and, since 2024, of the board of trustees of University College Roosevelt. He represented Utrecht University in the founding of the Delta Climate Center in Vlissingen, a partnership of six education and research institutions.

== Selected works ==
- Driessen, P. P. J. (1990). Landinrichting gewogen: de plaats van de milieu-, natuur- en landschapsbelangen in het landinrichtingsbeleid. Zeist: Kerckebosch.
- Driessen, Peter P. J.; Glasbergen, Pieter, eds. (2002). Greening Society: The Paradigm Shift in Dutch Environmental Politics. Kluwer Academic. doi:10.1007/978-94-015-9958-0.
- Driessen, Peter; Leroy, Pieter, eds. (2007). Milieubeleid: analyse en perspectief. Bussum: Coutinho.
- Driessen, Peter P. J.; Dieperink, Carel; van Laerhoven, Frank; Runhaar, Hens A. C.; Vermeulen, Walter J. V. (2012). "Towards a conceptual framework for the study of shifts in modes of environmental governance – experiences from the Netherlands". Environmental Policy and Governance. 22 (3): 143–160. doi:10.1002/eet.1580.
- Kundzewicz, Zbigniew W.; Hegger, Dries L. T.; Matczak, Piotr; Driessen, Peter P. J. (2018). "Flood-risk reduction: structural measures and diverse strategies". Proceedings of the National Academy of Sciences. 115 (49): 12321–12325. doi:10.1073/pnas.1818227115.
