= Ted Noten =

Dutch conceptual artist

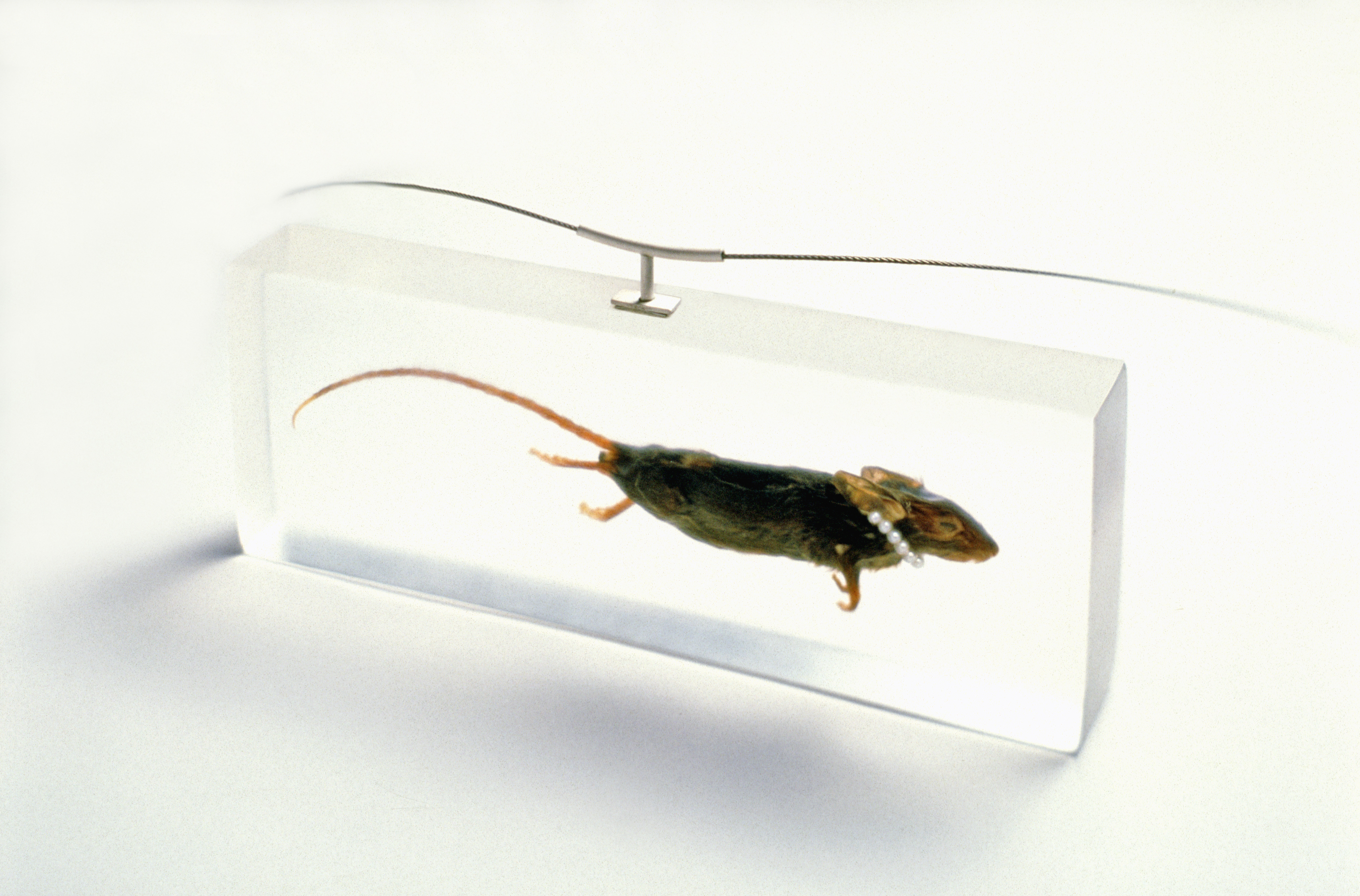
- Turbo Princess acrylic pendant (1995).
- Born: 18 December 1956 (age 69); Tegelen, Netherlands
- Education: Gerrit Rietveld Academie (1986-1990), Maastricht Academy for Applied Arts (1983-1986)
- Known for: Jewelry design, conceptual art
- Notable work: Haunted By 36 Women series (2009), A Tiara for Maxima (2002), Turbo Princess (1995)
- Awards: Herbert Hoffmann Preis
- Website: www.tednoten.com

Ted Noten (born 18 December 1956) is a Dutch conceptual artist. He is especially known for his Turbo Princess pendant featuring a mouse wearing a small pearl necklace, and his solid acrylic handbags and suitcases containing guns. A broad spectrum of galleries and museum collections all over the world represent his oeuvre. Since 2005, his design company Atelier Ted Noten, or ATN, has extended its jewellery creations towards (interior) design projects, installations and commissions for both private collectors, cultural organisations and art institutions.

== Life ==
Born in the Dutch town of Tegelen in 1956, Noten explored careers such as bricklaying and nursing at a psychiatric hospital before applying to art school. He enrolled in the Maastricht Academy for Applied Arts in the Netherlands, and in 1990 he obtained a degree from Amsterdam's Gerrit Rietveld Academie. From 2005 to 2008 Noten worked as a senior international research fellow at the Birmingham School of Jewellery of Birmingham City University in the UK. Since 2007 he teaches master classes at the Design Academy Eindhoven in the Netherlands.

== Works ==
Noten claims to be influenced by Marcel Duchamp, Francis Bacon, Damien Hurst, and Marilyn Monroe, among others.

=== Beginnings ===
A selection of Noten's early work:

- Alter Ago 3 brooch (1992) combining a piece of paper, gold wire and part of a bitter lemon soft drink can.
- Sweat With Horse ring (1992), a wooden chess piece and a golden ring loosely connect to form a wearable ring. The chess piece needs to be balanced continuously though by the wearer. There is horsehair attached to the side to absorb sweat.
- Stokpaaedje ring (1995), golden ring with black metal hobby horse on top.
- Bracelet for a Garagekeeper (1998), gold-plated aluminium bracelet composed of wrenches.

=== Turbo Princess ===
Noten's 1995 Turbo Princess pendant, featuring a little mouse cast in acrylic and wearing a small pearl necklace, started off his success. In 2011 it was commemorated by a limited edition pin.

A selection of Noten's other acrylic casts:

- If You Want To Be Beautiful, You Have To Suffer ring (1995), acrylic ring with open cup on top that is filled with a collection of pearls, diamonds and other gemstones. The wearer of the ring needs to hold the cup upright all the time to avoid losing its content.
- Meat Bag (1997), pork chop cast in acrylic with 18K gold-plated trim and leather strap.
- Survival Bag 1 (1997), mackerel cast in acrylic with second-hand handle.
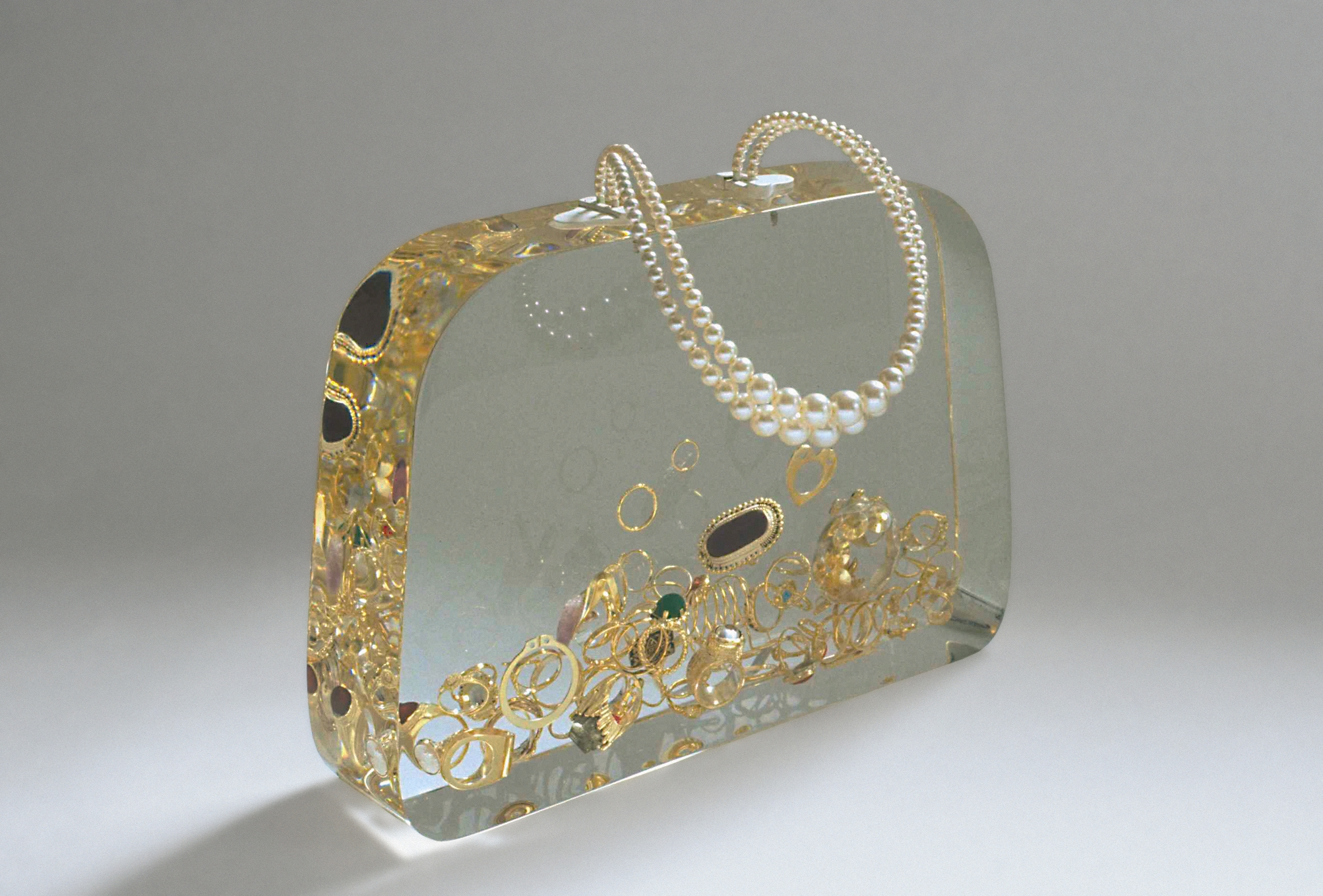
  Ageeth's Dowry bridal handbag (1999).
- Ageeth's Bruidsschat bag a.k.a. Ageeth's Dowry bag (1999), commissioned bridal handbag containing large amount of gold jewellery donated by the bride's family, with double pearl string carrying strap.
- Bitch Bag (2000), non-functional acrylic shoulderbag with single golden ring inside. In DSM collection.
- Superbitch Bag (2000), contains Walther handgun cast in acrylic with snakeskin strap.
- Salamander Bracelet (2001), shows a small salamander cast in acrylic. In the Stedelijk Museum 's-Hertogenbosch collection.
- Fly Attacks Diamond brooch (2002), fly cast in acrylic with diamond, silver trim.
- Physician's Bag (2004) with a collection of physician's instruments cast in acrylic.
- Lady-K-Bag (2004), Noten's first Lady K bag containing a gold-plated gun cast in acrylic with a fired bullet leaving the gun's muzzle, as if frozen in time.
- Paperheadring (2004) contains a tiny paper hat cast in acrylic.
- Female Knuckle Duster ring (2004) combines four acrylic rings to form a knuckle duster.
- Fabergé Revisited bag (2004) with large, broken egg and collection of gemstones cast in acrylic. Functional purse top.
- Donna Corleone's handbag (2004), contains a golden bullet, diamonds (2 ct), cocaine (1 g), and has chrome steel trim.
- Golden Pills Bag (2005), contains gold-plated pills cast in acrylic with snakeskin handle. Priced at €19,500.00.
- Icepick Bag (2005) contains icepick, golden ring, diamonds and cocaine cast in acrylic with pearl string carrying strap.
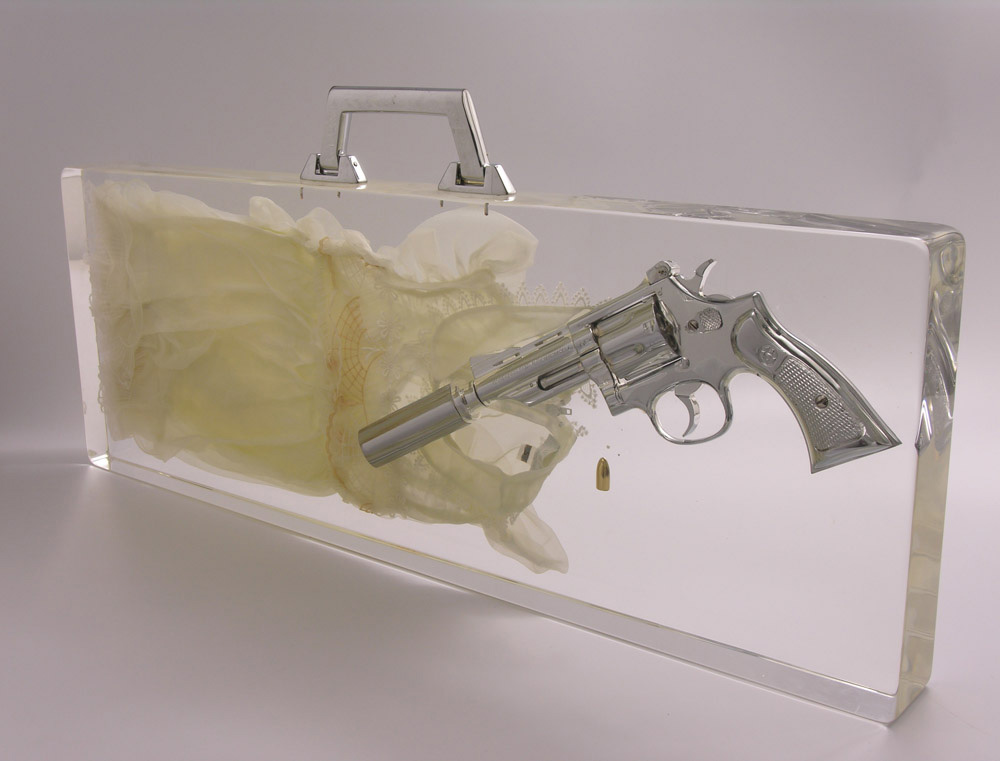
  Murdered Innocence attaché case (2005).
- Murdered Innocence attaché case (2005), containing a child's christening dress, as well as a silver-plated gun with silencer, a pearl, a diamond, and a golden bullet, all encased in acrylic with silver suitcase handle attached. In the Stedelijk Museum 's-Hertogenbosch collection.
- Love Bag (2005), based on Ageeth's Dowry (1999) this non-functional acrylic bag shows a large number of golden rings cast in acrylic with double pearl string carrying strap. Noten followed it up with a more rectangular Love Bag 2 a.k.a. Lyppens Bag.
- Love Bag 2 a.k.a. Lyppens Bag (2005) from the collection of Amsterdam-based jeweller Joost Lyppens.
- RataSmile carry-on luggage (2006), limited edition of three pieces containing large rat cast in acrylic with diamond in its mouth.
- Ice Ball necklace (2007), contains various items (i.e. cigarette butts) cast in acrylic balls with golden interconnections.
- Starling Bag (2007), black starling cast in acrylic, with long handle and rubber grip.
- Limited Edition series (2007), collection of 6 acrylic pieces (bags, cases, and a trolley). One handbag contains an artificial knee implant, another a medical pace maker, the Back up backpack shows a handgun, and the Paraphernalia case with pink strap contains a pearl necklace, 0.25K diamond, cocaine, a Kabbalah string, and a cross, reflecting the lifestyle of Madonna. The trolley A Split Second Before Imploding has Amsterdam-based fashion design duo Viktor & Rolf's Flowerbomb perfume suspended inside and is in the Stedelijk Museum Amsterdam collection.
- Wearable Art for Stars bags (2007), series of 12 unique acrylic bags, i.e. Marilyn and Sophia, except for the limited edition (8 pieces) Marriage Proposal Bag a.k.a. Tom & Katie Bag that contains two silver engagement rings, red heart with cross, yellow amethyst, and quartz crystal, all cast in acrylic with white functional top. Priced at €12,000.00.
- Lady K Bag Nr. 3 (2007), with gold-plated gun and bullet, functional top part.
- Lady K Bag Nr. 4 (2007), special Prada edition with Prada bag top part.
- I Visited the Waterside necklace (2008), contains a wide variety of found objects cast in acrylic with 18K golden interconnections.
- Beautiful by accident a.k.a. Louis Vuitton Bag (2008), a Louis Vuitton bag cast in one-piece acrylic with integrated handle.
- No Title Yet ... carry-on luggage (2008), Noten's first black acrylic suitcase with the contents (a laptop and an iPod) invisible to the naked eye. The viewer is allowed a peek inside by means of a gold-plated lightbox with an X-ray image of the suitcase.
- Choker Revisited necklace (2008), consists of six oval acrylic parts with different gem stones (including diamonds) inside, 18K gold-plated interconnections.
- Superbitch Bag Lady K (2008), a limited edition of 7 pieces of a functional handbag containing a gold-plated Walther PPK handgun engraved with flowers and cast in acrylic.
- When I used to be a kid trolley (2008), acrylic casting with wooden rubber band gun and pink plastic trim.
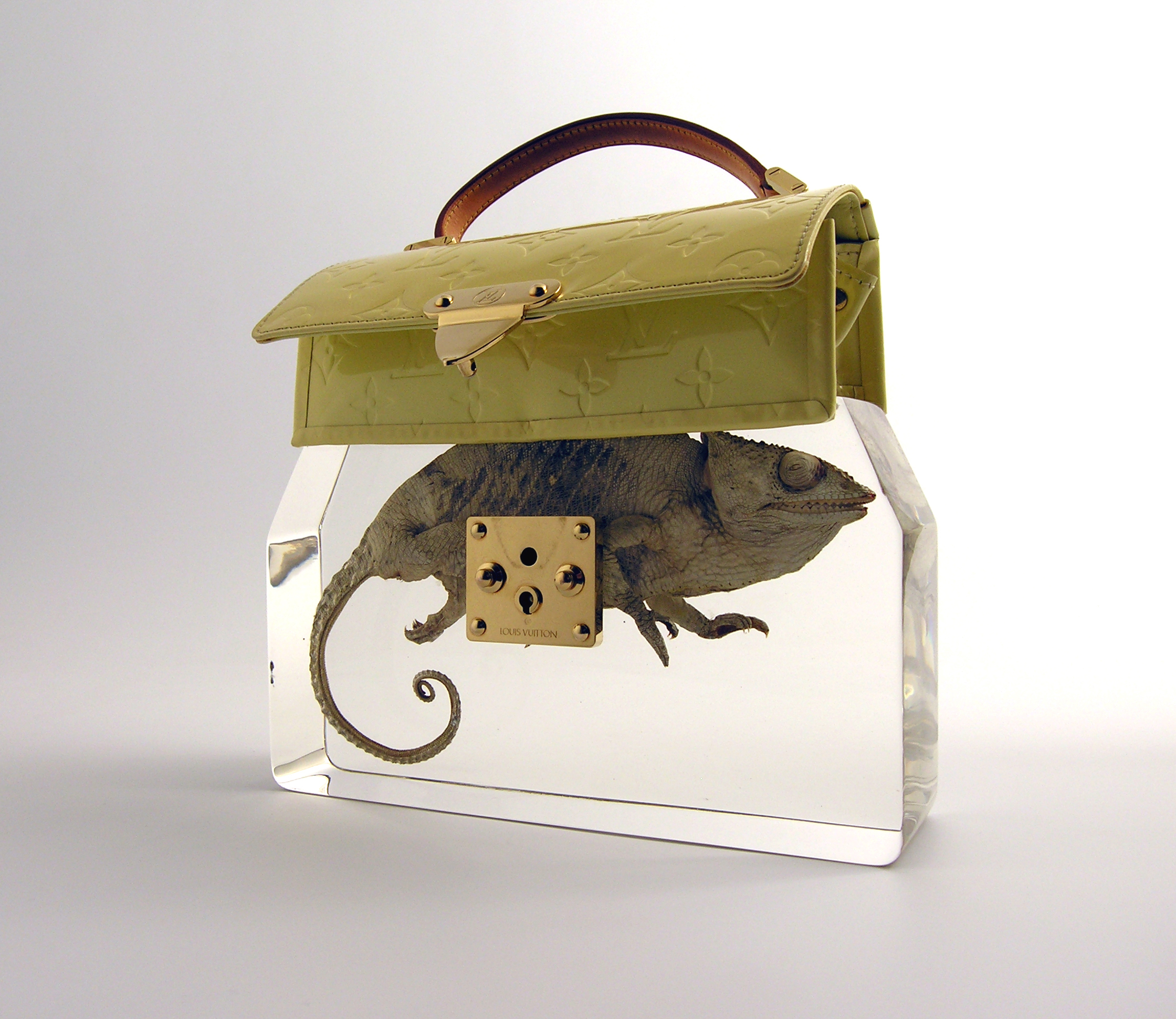
  Grandma's Bag Revisited (2009). Photography: Atelier Ted Noten.
- Grandma's Bag Revisited a.k.a. Chameleon Bag (2009), large chameleon encased in acrylic with a grin on its face, functional Louis Vuitton top part and gold-plated trim. Priced at €25,000.00.
- Al Gore Backpack (2009), a 50 kg acrylic bloc with a portable TomTom GPS navigation system inside that is set for a slowly melting glacier in Switzerland. The backpack was displayed on the Laughing Prohibited! exhibition during Dutch Design Week.
- Uzi Mon Amour attaché case (2009) with 24K gold-plated Uzi submachine gun cast in acrylic, limited edition of 5 pieces engraved with flowers and with a Chinese love poem engraved around the silencer. Priced at US$92,000.00.
- Ted meets Joost Lyppens (2010), a collaboration between Atelier Ted Noten and Joost Lyppens of Lyppens Jewellery, Amsterdam, resulting in a collection of 12 rings, 4 earrings, 3 bracelets and 3 necklaces with black, white and coloured diamonds, all cast in acrylic and with 18K golden trim. The Coco Chanel Revisited necklace and the Black Widow necklace (with black acrylic castings) are part of this project.
- 21 Necklace (2010), contains 21st century remnants (computer parts, electric components, plugs, etc.) cast in acrylic. The connecting parts are 3D-printed nylon.
- Voorheen Q.E. a.k.a. Previously owned by Queen Elizabeth bag (2011), acrylic handbag with 18K gold-plated sewing implements and an antique purse.
- This Is Not A Ring brooch, which can be worn as a ring as well by people with a mind of their own. Yellow facetted amethyst cast in acrylic with 18K goldwire and gold-plated safetylock. Unique piece priced at €850.00.

=== Chew Your Own Brooch ===
In 1998 Noten developed an ongoing project called Chew Your Own Brooch. It was first explored at the Rotterdam art museum Boijmans van Beuningen. Appr. 800 visitors, including many children, were given a piece of chewing gum and asked to "chew their own brooch". Once they were satisfied with the shape they had produced, the piece was put in a little box, marked, and judged by a panel. First, second and third-place winners were then presented with their brooches, made of their own piece of chewing gum cast respectively in 24K gold, silver and bronze. For many years now Noten has provided clients with their own chewing kit. When the client is satisfied with the shape they produced the piece of gum is returned and a replica brooch is made cast in silver or gold.

=== Wearable Gold ===
Wearable Gold a.k.a. Object (2001) consists of a pair of inconspicuous black and white sling back shoes with 24K gold insoles, allowing the wearer to walk on gold without attracting too much attention, as well as providing security in less fortunate times. Noten got inspired when he met a stranger on a train, a Jewish man who spoke of the horrors of being in Auschwitz during the Second World War, and about money, poverty and death. The man explained that gold and diamonds were the only real currency and that he still carried gold inside his shoes for security against the next rainy day. Wearable Gold 2 are 24K gold glazed porcelain pendants that are much less inconspicuous and only serve to impress the onlooker as the real value in gold is limited.

A similar concept, but now in silver, is Noten's N.T. 2011, a 5 kg 999/1000 silver bar one can carry around by its handle and shoulder strap. In a limited edition of 3 pieces.

=== I Am Being Nice to My Colleagues ===
Noten's design I Am Being Nice to My Colleagues (2001) consists of an A4 silver plate that is blank except for two indented concentric circles. This first ring is ready to wear. When the buyer wishes to have a new ring made, they can commission another designer to create another ring from the plate. Eventually only the silhouettes of previous rings will be left. Noten invites other designers to share his concept and create their own work within the concept's parameters.

=== Mercedes Brooch ===
The Mercedes Brooch is made from steel parts cut from the body of a Mercedes-Benz E-Class 210 model luxury car. Noten started this project in 2001 with his work 100 Pieces in which he took a section of a new car and divided it into 100 fragments, each unique in size and form. That way the brooch wearer could become part owner of a new Mercedes-Benz. Noten followed it up in 2003 with a different car. In 2007 and 2008 he just used the hood. The 2001 brooches are white, the 2003 red. Priced at €200.00 a piece.

=== A Tiara for Maxima ===
In 2002, Noten participated among 40 (21 in final) Dutch artists and designers in a tiara design competition honouring the marriage between Maxima Zorreguieta and the Dutch crown prince Willem-Alexander. Noten's design of a shiny chromed polo helmet with a clip-on tiara won first prize. The jury referred to it as a 'cheeky' design. Noten intended the tiara, with small portraits of all Dutch queens positioned as guardian angels on top, to be used in church during the wedding ceremony. Afterwards the princess could combine the tiara with the helmet to protect herself against paparazzi when she ventured into the city of Amsterdam (or if she felt confident enough her husband might want to wear the helmet).

=== The Pistol Saints ===
The use of guns in Noten's work came about by chance. In the past Noten had felt uneasy about the large number of people in his neighbourhood that carried guns. Whenever he could he would ask people to give him their gun or he would buy it from them. He would then throw it away or keep it in store without any particular purpose for it. After a while he had quite a collection and he thought he might just as well use these guns in his works of art. It also gave him the idea of a project he called Design Against Crime in which he collaborated with the authorities to persuade people to give up their guns in return for a work of art.

Noten's work The Pistol Saints (2003) is part of the Design Against Crime project. Whenever Noten asked people why they carried a gun they said it made them feel more secure, although most of them never actually used their gun. This inspired him to copy what he called the soul of the gun in pieces of jewellery the owner could wear instead of the gun. The Pistol Saints consists of twelve golden brooches with imprints of a gun. On the brooches the gun markings can be clearly distinguished.

The Pistol Saints received wide public attention when it was displayed at the 2004 exhibition on contemporary jewellery Geel metalliek: Goud voor Robert Smit at the Stedelijk Museum Amsterdam. This was because Noten not only then displayed the golden brooches but also, as part of the artwork, the gun he used to make the imprints with. As he had no official licence for this gun it was confiscated by the police and destroyed. Though unintended, the police action of removing the gun from the exhibition but leaving the brooches with the gun markings, contributed to the meaning of the work.

=== Mr Claw ===
At art exhibitions the visitor usually is not allowed to touch the displayed objects, not even when they clearly have a functional background like an artistic chair or jewellery. Therefore, Noten used a funfair machine he called Mr Claw to offer visitors the opportunity to actually touch works of art. Mr Claw contains plastic bubbles with small pieces of jewellery inside the visitor can attempt to grab by using the machine's remote-controlled grabber. As a special attraction Noten put a 1 kg silver bar inside as well (unfortunately this item is too heavy to be lifted by the grabber). Mr Claw was used at the Stedelijk Museum Amsterdam Geel metalliek: Goud voor Robert Smit exhibition on contemporary jewellery in 2004, and at the Icon Experiment 2008 exhibition in London, UK.

=== Unstaged ===
At a 2004 exhibition at the Amsterdam art society Arti & Amicitiae Noten used an installation with an industrial robot to show his Paperheadring that contained a tiny paper hat cast in acrylic. In the 2011 project Lady Killer Vol. 1 the concept of an automated jewellery box was further explored.

=== Golden Piles ===
In 2004, Noten collected a large amount of low-price earthenware crockery from a Dutch budget store. He arranged the crockery in piles, fixed the design and had it gold-plated as a contrast. These unique objects he called Golden Piles or Festive Table Centers. Golden Pile 9 (2004) is a stack of plates that is in the Rotterdam Museum Boijmans van Beuningen collection.

=== Global Tactile Pieces Vol. II ===
On Noten's 2004 trip from Tokyo to Amsterdam he purchased, found or swapped objects that he afterwards transformed into jewelry designs that represented cities he visited, experiences he had, and people he met. In total 16 different works, i.e. the Chinese city of Tianjin is represented by a necklace with a large red drill. The Mongolian city of Erenhot is represented by a pendant that is now in the Middlesbrough Institute of Modern Art collection.

=== St. James Cross Revisited ===
In 2005, visitors to the National Museum of Ancient Art in Lisbon, Portugal, which houses ancient art treasures from around the world, would receive a special brooch Noten designed by using the emblem of the Order of Saint James of the Sword, a famous Portuguese Order of Chivalry. Then the visitors were invited to make a picture or portrait with the brooch in their hometown and place this image on a dedicated website. That way a special bond would be created between the worldwide visitors' community and the museum.

=== The Real Love Bracelet ===
In 2005, Noten commented on Cartier's iconic Love Bracelet, that can only be unlocked by the partner, by producing The Real Love Bracelet, a silver bracelet attached to a blown glass bubble with a pair of rings inside. That way the wearer always has a pair of rings handy and only needs to break the bubble when the right moment has arrived.

=== Wedding Pills ===
As an alternative to traditional wedding rings, Noten designed a pair of golden Wedding Pills (2007). These are micro-inscribed with the names of the couple and the date of their wedding, and are to be swallowed during the marriage ceremony. Later they can be recovered from their journey through the body, and reused as a recurring ritual to strengthen the couple's bond after a marriage crisis.

=== Be nice to a girl, buy her a ring ===
In 2008 the city of Amsterdam started a project to improve the red light district in the old city centre. Noten participated with a street vending machine that sold red rings with a wide variety of designs for only €2.50. The rings were intended to be bought for the neighbourhood prostitutes by their clients. Noten called the project Be nice to a girl, buy her a ring and hoped it would improve the mutual respect between prostitutes and clients, and that it might even introduce a more romantic atmosphere in the red light district. Afterwards he offered the red rings, cased and numbered in a limited edition of 250 pieces, as true art objects for €310.00 each.

=== Messin' around with Willy ===
For the 2008 exhibition LINGAM - 121 contemporary fertility symbols artists, designers and jewellery makers from 24 countries were asked to create new lingam objects based on the ancient fertility symbol. Noten contributed with a series of porcelain dildos with miniature objects attached, i.e. a car pulling a caravan and a highway lamppost. A white porcelain dildo with miniature Delftware attached is priced at €3,000.00.

=== Periscope ===
In 2008 Atelier Ted Noten provided the renovated Rotterdam art museum Boijmans van Beuningen with a multimedia installation. It consists of a golden mobile, called Periscope, positioned in the museum's lobby. The museum's new entrance ticket is a letter that the visitor can use to display an image of an item from the museum's collection on one of the walls of the lobby. The letter changes daily, the text and images projected from Periscope change equally.

=== TEDWALK ===
On November 23, 2008, Noten was awarded with the Francoise van den Bosch award, an international prize for innovative jewellery makers, and he combined the award ceremony with a catwalk presentation of highlights from his work since 1995 for the opening of a solo-exhibition at the Stedelijk Museum 's-Hertogenbosch.

=== The Revenge of the Pearl Necklace ===
In 2009, during the fashion exhibition Gejaagd door de wind (Gone with the wind) at the Zuiderzeemuseum in Enkhuizen, Noten showed his work The Revenge of the Pearl Necklace consisting of the decomposing body of a pike that gradually exposed a pearl necklace Noten had put inside the stomach of the fish. Visitors were overwhelmed by the smell. Later during the exhibition Noten showed a video of the decomposing process together with the pike's cleaned skeleton and the necklace itself. With The Revenge Noten is referring to the Zuiderzee fishermen's loathing of pearls as these were very popular with the nobility.

=== Haunted by 36 Women ===
In 2009, Noten started, inspired by a card of Japanese artist Hokusai Katsushika (1760–1849), his ongoing Haunted by 36 Women project. Like Hokusai who created 36 drawings from the mountain he loved, Noten chose 36 archetypes of women to design jewellery for. First, a life-size sculpture is constructed, which is then transformed into a wearable art object, made out of different materials like nylon, stainless steel, titanium, silver or gold.

So far Noten has created, among others, Career Woman (a limited edition of three pieces 18K gold-plated ring decorated with a miniature office chair combined with the saddle of a racing bicycle), Iron Lady (a ring with an iPod), Femme Fatale (a ring with a miniature fencing foil attached, flexible by the use of rubber-filled nylon and priced at €225.00, also in the Stedelijk Museum 's-Hertogenbosch collection), Macha (a ring with a machinegun), Ice-cream girl (a ring and a bracelet with a pair of pointed stiletto shoes on a car tire), Chocolate Hooker (a ring with a serving dish filled with chocolates and priced at €150.00) and Kenau (a ring with a purse and a pair of boxing gloves).

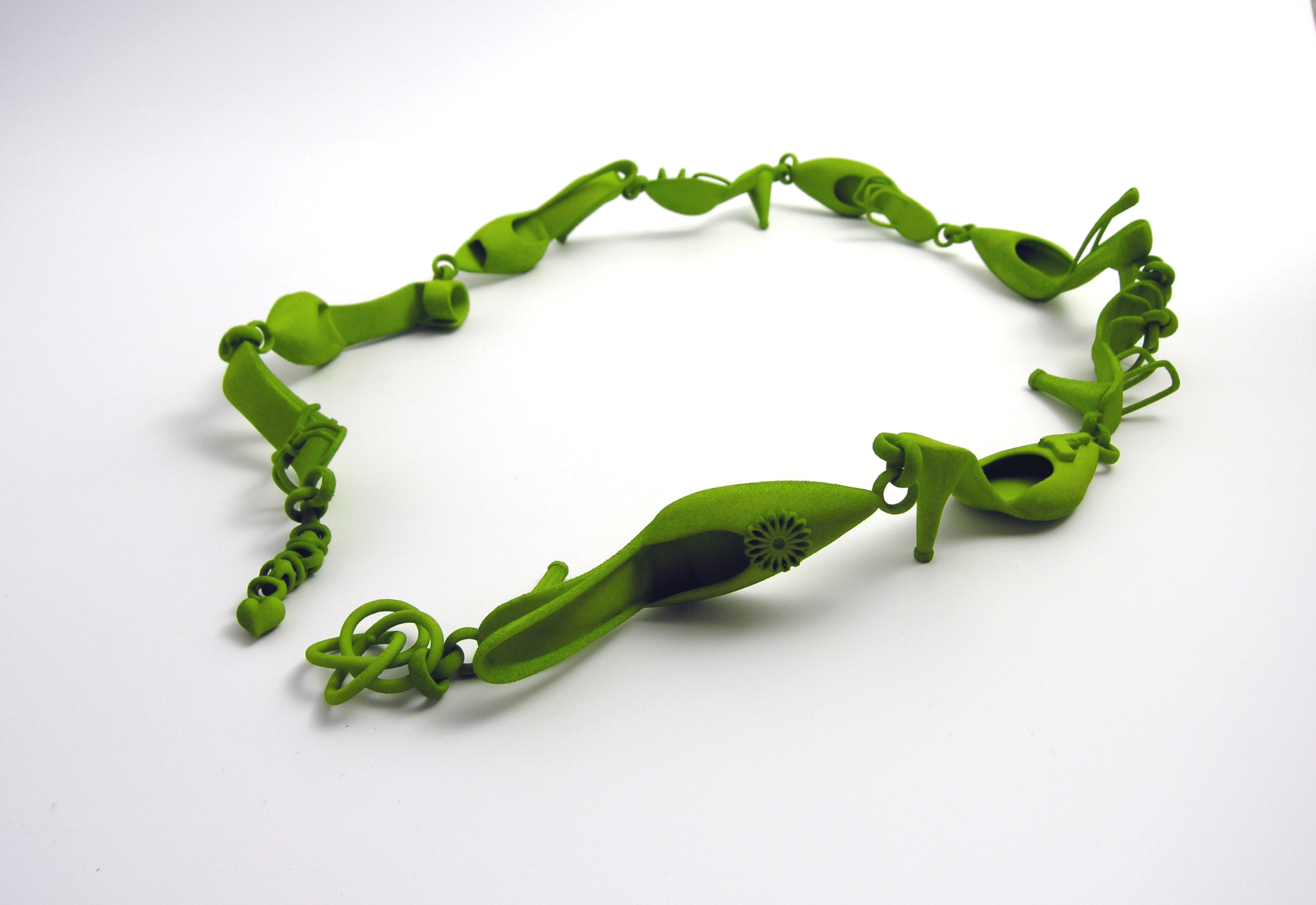
Fashionista necklace in green (2009).

The limited edition of eight pieces of the Fashionista 3D-printed glass-filled nylon necklace with miniature stiletto shoes is part of the project. The nylon necklace is priced at €1,400.00. Noten also produced a limited edition of ten unique pieces, each with a different gold element, called Fashionista Golden Girl. In addition a single edition necklace with all gold elements was made and a single edition all gold piece. Noten also produced the lacquered nylon Suffragette ring, priced at €950.00, and the 18K gold Muse ring priced at €18,500.00. The Mom brooch, of laser sintered nylon, is priced at €175.00.

A special design is Avondvlinder (translated Evening butterfly, another expression for prostitute) a.k.a. Miss Piggy (a ring with on top a piglet with a pearl necklace) that is produced in gold and titanium, as well as in nylon. It is based on Noten's 2008 Pig Bracelet made of sintered nylon. The Pig Bracelet is priced at €1,800.00 and the Avondvlinder (Miss Piggy) ring at appr. €13,000.00 (18K gold and depending on gold price), or €925.00 (titanium), or €80.00 (glassfiber-filled nylon).

=== Last Cigarette ===
Since 2010 Ted Noten offers people who have quit smoking a reminder as well as moral support by making a brooch from their last cigarette. These unique brooches are 18K gold-plated and priced at €850.00.

=== Vertical Rainbow ===
In 2010, Atelier Ted Noten participated in the exhibition Contemplating the Void that marked the 50th anniversary of the Guggenheim Museum in New York City. The museum asked for designs that would provide the visitor with an inspiring view of the large central atrium of the Guggenheim building. ATN suggested an installation design that made use of a sparkling curtain of Swarovski crystals falling from the ceiling. A special projector light on the crystals would then generate a vertical rainbow of colours across the atrium.

=== Three Stars Bomb ! ===
At first glance the Three Stars Bomb! looks like a classic bomb with long wick. But once ignited it appears to be a candle that gradually displays three bronze stars that can be worn as brooches (i.e. to imitate a three-star rank). Comes with the Swedish Three Stars Safety Matches that inspired Noten to make this design. Displayed during Milan Design Week 2010 and now in the Centraal Museum Utrecht collection. Priced at €39.95.

=== The Temptation ===
In 2010, Noten designed a life-size apple with a golden stem, topped with a small black diamond, called De Verleiding (The Temptation). The golden stem with diamond is in fact a brooch and the apple serves as a decorative stand for when the brooch is not worn. In a yellow and a black 3D-printed limited edition of ten pieces it is priced at €1,200.00.

=== Wanna Swap Your Ring ? ===
During the Tokyo Design Week of September 2010 Noten participated in the exhibition Catalysis for Life - New Language of Dutch Art & Design at the Museum of Contemporary Art, Tokyo (MOT) in Japan. He arranged 500 of his Miss Piggy rings in the shape of his gun icon on a wall to offer the visitors an interactive art installation he called Wanna Swap Your Ring ?. Many visitors then used the opportunity to swap their own ring for a Noten ring, leaving a genuine jungle of rings behind. Noten commented he did not know what to do with these visitors' rings yet but that he would surely find a purpose for them. Given the success he plans to use the Wanna Swap Your Ring installation at art exhibitions worldwide.

=== SLOW - Eleven Women and 400 Daisies ===
To celebrate the opening of the Mint Museum Uptown, the Mint Museum of Craft+Design, Charlotte, US, launched Project Ten Ten Ten on October 1, 2010. Ten innovative international artists in the fields of glass, jewelry, furniture and fiber art where commissioned, including Ted Noten, to create exclusive works for the permanent collection of the museum. Noten developed an interactive piece called SLOW - Eleven Women and 400 Daisies as an homage to the Mint Museum's Auxiliary women, as well as to all American women. SLOW consists of a golden buste, with the features of ten famous American women, that is completely covered with white 3D-printed nylon daisies. The daisies double as brooches and every new Auxiliary member will be given one to wear. That way it will take appr. 18 years before the entire bust is revealed (hence the title SLOW).

=== Pig Head Trophy ===
Each year the Design Academy Eindhoven commissions an artist to design a trophy for the academy's graduates. For the 2010 edition Noten worked with Amsterdam-based 3D-printing company Freedom Of Creation (FOC) to create his Pig Head Trophy, consisting of a sliced pig head with one slice per graduate. Not only was each and every slice different, they were also customized to show which course the student took.

=== Dutch Fashion Awards ===
In 2010 and 2011 Atelier Ted Noten teamed up with Amsterdam-based 3D-printing company Freedom Of Creation (FOC) to create the Dutch Fashion Awards. These designs consist of 3D-printed necklaces that represent each of the six prize categories. Matching badges for jury officials were also made. Special attention was given to the Mercedes sponsored award that incorporates the Mercedes star. The 2010 awards are yellow, the 2011 are red.

=== Art Rehab ===
In 2011, Noten used the large taxi driver community of the UK industrial city of Middlesbrough to promote the exhibition The Modern Jewel - In time and the mind of others at MIMA, the Middlesbrough Institute of Modern Art. He thought of working with taxi drivers after seeing the landmark bridge in the area, the Middlesbrough Transporter Bridge, that was celebrating its centenary. The transporter bridge operates very much like a ferry and during the lengthy crossing taxi drivers usually have nothing much else to do than to talk to their passenger(s).

Noten started the project with interviews, asking the taxi drivers how they felt about art, what they knew about MIMA and what they would like him, as an artist, to create for their cars. He received answers like 'I used to wear a ring for good luck', 'would like a girl on the hood', and 'I'm too busy for art'. These, sometimes puzzling, quotes were used on posters announcing the exhibition throughout the city.

Then Noten provided 300 taxi drivers with a little brooch and a slightly larger object, both the shape of a wing (referring to the godly messenger Hermes). The winged brooch was attached to the driver's jacket and the larger wing to the dashboard, functioning as a conversation piece to trigger the curiosity of customers. If the driver felt no inclination to talk about MIMA, he could use a CD to inform an inquisitive customer during the drive.

Finally, the taxi driver would provide the customer with a flyer about the exhibition with a Post-it sticker in the shape of a wing. The flyer invited the customer to write down their opinion of the exhibition on the sticker and paste it to a wall at MIMA. This wall eventually became an artwork itself, with the stickers positioned as feathers within the contours of a drawing of a large wing. The Hermes-flyers were also available at other places in town, such as waiting rooms of doctors, libraries, the town hall, etcetera. The flyer also entitled a visitor of the exhibition to a 40% discount on a winged Noten ring.

=== Lady Killer Vol. 1 ===
In 2011, Atelier Ted Noten and UK creative company Laikingland designed a modern-day jewellery box called Lady Killer Vol. 1. It is made by 3D printing techniques and comprises a robotic arm that grabs and presents a single piece of stored jewellery. The gold-plated Lady Killer ring designed for this project has on top a miniature gun with a white and a black diamond.

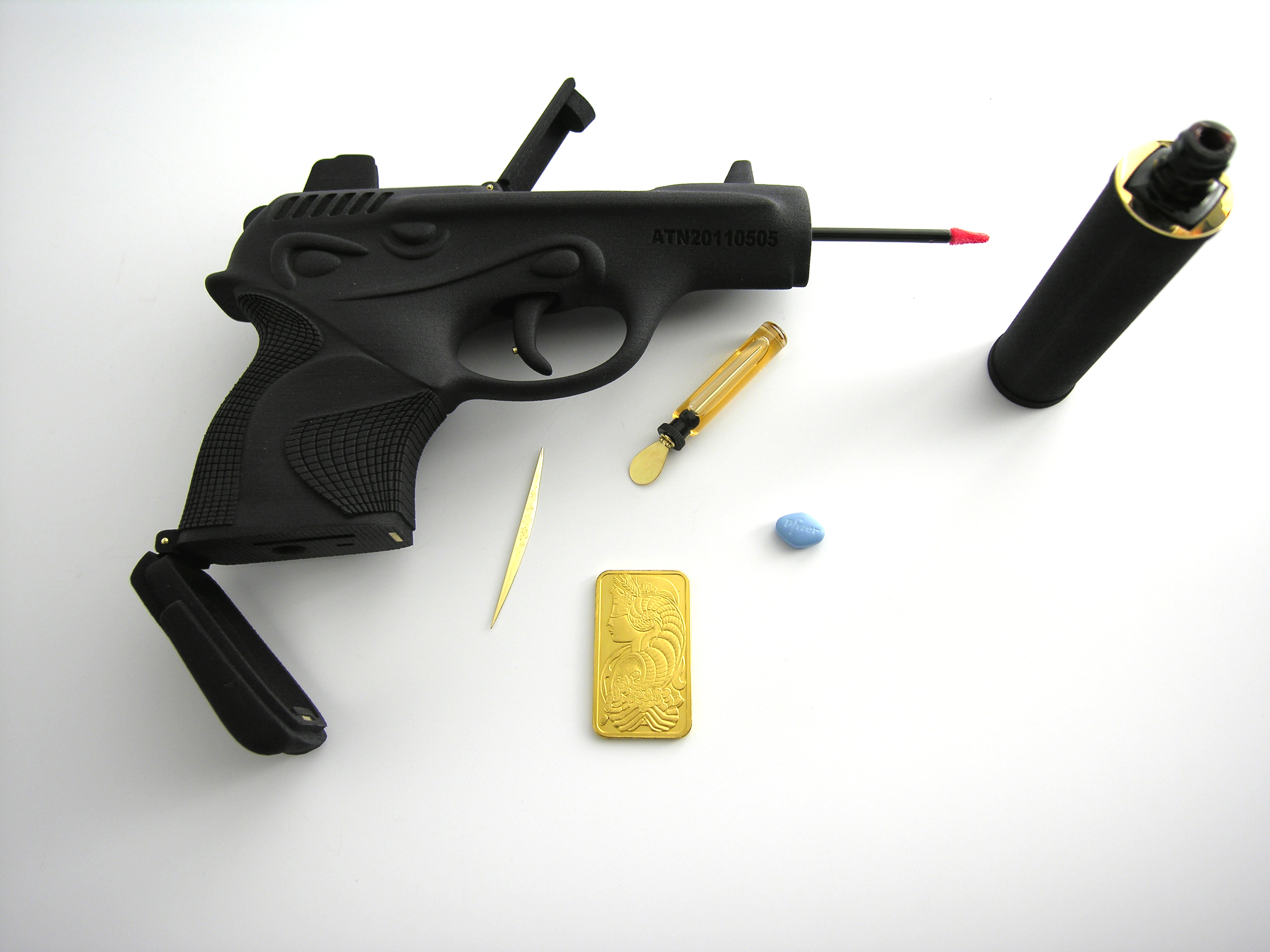
Chanel 001 gun bag in black (2011).

=== 7 Necessities for a Woman ===
In 2011, Noten also designed a white Dior 001 gun and a black Chanel 001 gun with hand-tooled 18-karat gold details, as part of a larger series entitled 7 Necessities for a Woman (to feel like a woman through the eyes of a man). The two 3D-printed nylon guns double as make-up bags with lip gloss and wand in the muzzle, the loading chamber serves as a pill compartment (complete with pills, including Viagra), 100 grams of certified silver bullion in the Dior gun clip, 50 grams of 24-karat gold in the Chanel, a toothpick and, in some models, a hairpin and a small vial of perfume. The guns also conceal a 4-gigabyte USB memory stick. Priced at US$11,500.00 (Dior gun) and over US$17,000.00 (Chanel gun) respectively.

=== Smartphone Jewels ===
Noten developed his Smartphone Jewels project as part of the contemporary jewelry exhibition Unleashed! held at the Dutch Museum voor Moderne Kunst Arnhem (MMKA) in Arnhem from November 4, 2011 until February 6, 2012. The exhibition is advertised throughout the Arnhem city center with posters that each carry a different QR-tag to be scanned by a smartphone. Each tag provides the smartphone user with additional information on jewelry related topics, i.e. the price of gold or political commentary on blood diamonds or a story about miners. When all tags are scanned the smartphone user receives an individual code that can be exchanged for a 3D-printed Noten gunring at the exhibition. Noten also designed a special 3D-printed glassfiber-filled nylon smartphone (iPhone) cover with daisies and a bicolor ring to match priced at €395.00.

== Monograph ==
In 2006, Rotterdam-based 010 publishers published Noten's 328-page monograph titled CH_{2}=C(CH_{3})C(=O)CH_{3} enclosures and other TN's (ISBN 978 90 6450 555 3). The title refers to the chemical formula of the PMMA material, much used by Noten. Created out of a pile of thousands of photographs, combined with informational as well as poetic text, the book offers compositions, associations, and narratives to illustrate Noten's work. It achieved the Best Dutch Book Design 2006 award.

== Documentaries ==
In 2007, a half-hour radio interview was aired in which Noten discusses his monograph with Brett Littman, the director of The Drawing Center art museum in New York City.

A short video interview was recorded at the Design Miami 2008 exhibition. Noten explains how some of his most famous works came about and that his intuition plays an important role in the creative process.

In 2009, the Dutch Design Fashion and Architecture (DutchDFA) group commissioned a short documentary film about Noten as part of their Dutch Profiles series on contemporary architects and graphic, product and fashion designers in the Netherlands. These documentaries are meant to be spread freely over the web and as part of lectures, exhibitions and business presentations.

In 2010, a one-hour documentary film called Goud, Zweet & Parels (Gold, Sweat & Pearls) was produced by Dutch director Simone de Vries and broadcast on Dutch television. It portrays Ted Noten, his work and his philosophy:

I make jewellery that takes some time getting used to. When you wear it, you make yourself vulnerable as it makes such a striking statement. I speak out through my jewellery and objects. I comment upon jewellery as a phenomenon, upon the industry or – like any artist – upon humanity.

— Ted Noten (1956) in 2010 documentary Goud, Zweet & Parels.

== Exhibitions and collections ==
Noten has participated in numerous exhibitions around the world and he is represented by galleries and museum collections worldwide. In 2006, Noten was a keynote speaker at the Society of North American Goldsmiths (SNAG) conference in Chicago. In 2011, Atelier Ted Noten participated in the Glasstress exhibition.

== Awards ==
In 1998, Noten was awarded the German Herbert Hoffmann Preis. Every year this award is granted to three outstanding jewelry designers who show their work at the Schmuck exhibition in Munich, Germany. Schmuck was established in 1959 by Dr. Herbert Hoffmann and is the eldest exhibition of contemporary jewellery work in the world. Noten's tiara design for Dutch crown princess Maxima won the first prize in 2002. In 2006 his monograph CH2=C(CH3)C(=O)OCH3 and other TN's published by Rotterdam-based publisher 010 won Best Dutch Book Designs. In 2008, Noten received the Dutch Françoise van den Bosch award, which recognizes an international jeweler whose work embodies exceptional quality and innovation. In 2011 Ted Noten won the Dutch Artist of the Year award.
