= Sablones =

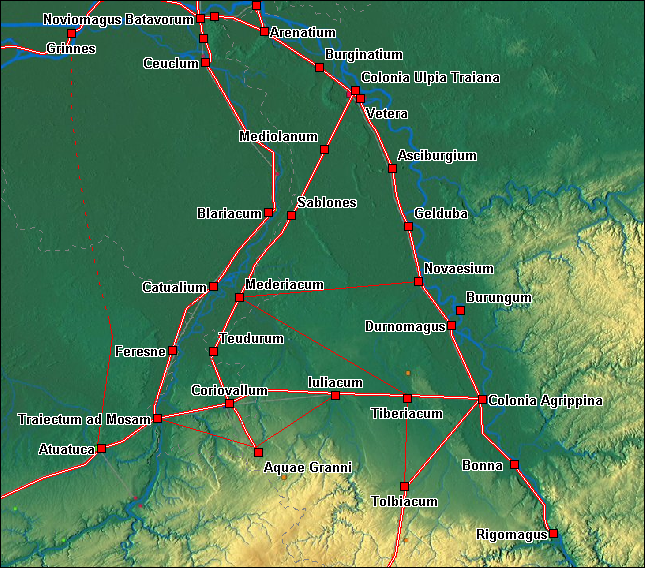
Roman roads between Tongeren, Nijmegen and Cologne

Sablones was a Roman settlement in the province of Germania Inferior (Lower Germania), probably near modern-day Kaldenkirchen in Germany, just across the border from Venlo in the Netherlands. The statio is mentioned in the Roman travel guide Antonine Itinerary (Itinerarium Antonini) between Meridacium (Melick) and Mediolanum (Germania inferior) (Pont (Geldern)) and was located on the Roman road from Coriovallum (Heerlen) to Colonia Ulpia Traiana (Xanten).

It has been conjectured that the city of Venlo now occupies the site, but without proof.

== See also ==
- List of Latin place names in Continental Europe, Ireland and Scandinavia
