= Kinabureau =

Dutch organisation that regulated the trade in cinchona bark

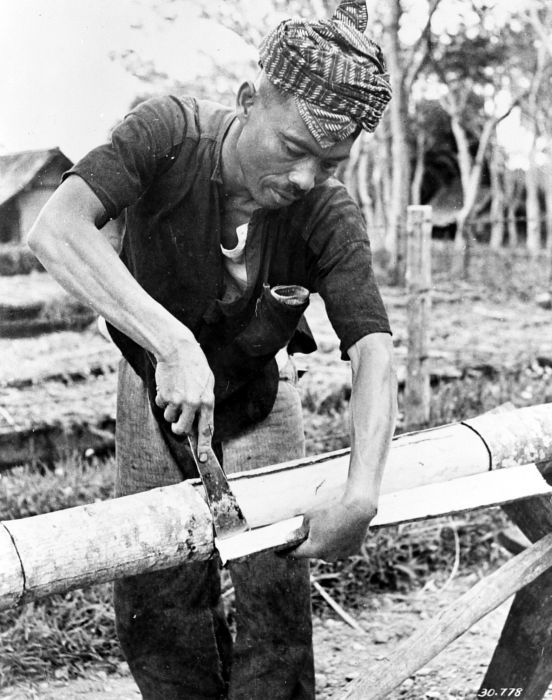
The collection of the cinchona bark on a Dutch-Indonesian plantation

The Kinabureau (or Kina Bureau) was a Dutch organization that regulated the trade in cinchona bark, founded in 1913 and headquartered in the Dutch capital of Amsterdam. Cinchona bark was mainly important for the production of quinine, at that time just about the only effective remedy against malaria. The Kinabureau was part of a cartel of producers of cinchona bark and quinine. About 90% of the cinchona bark was produced in the then Dutch East Indies, mainly on the Pengalengan plateau near Bandung. The vast majority of the cinchona producers were members of the organization, and they were obliged to deliver all their cinchona bark to the Bureau, at prices set by the Bureau. This effectively created a Dutch-Indonesian monopoly on the production of anti-malaria medicines.

== History ==
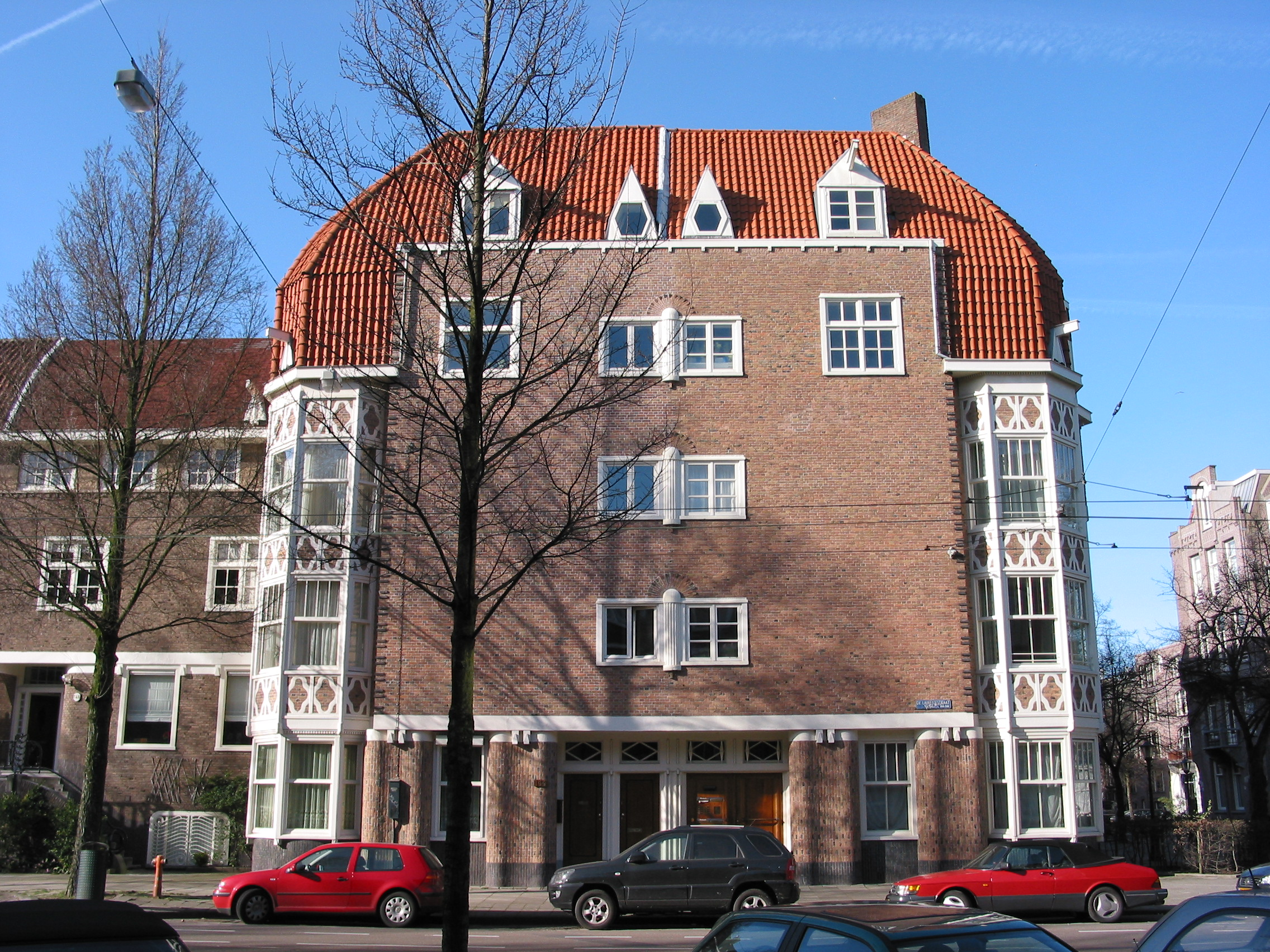
Lairessestraat 142, where the Kinabureau was later located.

The Kinabureau implemented the so-called Kina agreements, multi-year agreements in which producers of cinchona bark and manufacturers who made quinine from it made agreements about production and prices. The aim of this was to counter price fluctuations that had previously led to too much uncertainty.

In 1939, approximately 7,000 tons of cinchona bark and 180 tons of quinine were exported from the Dutch East Indies. During World War II, the Dutch East Indies were occupied by Japan and no cinchona bark or quinine was exported from there to the West. The cinchona plantations were kept intact by the Japanese, because they needed the quinine themselves. In an attempt to compensate for the loss of supply, plantations were set up in the Belgian Congo, among other places. After the war the Kinabureau tried to set up a joint arrangement with the Congolese plantations, which failed due to the unstable situation in the Congo. In 1957, the plantations in Indonesia (which had become independent of the Netherlands) were nationalized, which further reduced the importance of the Kinabureau.

== Criticism and decline ==
The organization was repeatedly criticized in the international press. It was said that production was deliberately limited in order to maintain artificially high prices, to the detriment of the southern European countries in particular that were struggling with outbreaks of malaria. In contrast, Dr. M. G. J. M. Kerbosch, director of the government cinchona plantation Tjinjiroean, argued that the demanded higher production from the Dutch East Indies was infeasible as distribution infrastructure was lacking. U.S. attempts to prosecute the Kinabureau proved unsuccessful.

The importance of cinchona production and the Kinabureau also declined due to the development of new, synthetic drugs. As early as 1928, IG Farben had found an effective synthetic antimalarial drug, but this had serious side effects. Two other synthetic drugs, primaquine and chloroquine, were developed during the Second World War. These played an important role in the fight against malaria until the 1990s.

== Industry successors ==
In 1961, the Kinabureau was dissolved. In 1959 and 1960, six European quinine manufacturers, including the Dutch Nedchem and the German Boehringer, had already quietly set up a new cartel, in which they divided the prices and the market. Among other things, Nedchem manipulated prices with the large quinine stocks that the US had built up during the Second World War and that Nedchem had purchased in the years 1961–1964. Even when new European regulations prohibited this type of cartel, they continued and were not reported to the European competition authorities. The Americans in particular were upset when this 'quinine cartel' was eventually exposed, and a Senate committee conducted an investigation. As a result, the European Commission started its own investigation, which resulted in fines for the companies that were part of the cartel in 1969. Nedchem and Boehringer were fined approximately NLG 600,000, the first fines in a European competition case under the antitrust provisions of the Treaty of Rome.
