= Johan van Lom =

Johan van Lom (or van Lomme, called Johan van Lom the Old) (before 1465 – 24 March 1538 or 1539) was a politician and philanthropist from Venlo, Netherlands. From 1499 to 1503 he was Scholtis or Richter in Venlo. From 1517 to 1538 he was Schepen of Roermond. He was burgemeester in Venlo in 1507, 1516, and 1527. He married Katharina (Katryn or Tryne), who was possibly of the house van Eijll before 1500, and then to Margaret van Vernich (Verningen, Vernych), widow of Herman Heesmans. Other than his political career, he is noted as a philanthropist of religious institutions near Roermond and Venlo.

== Family and children ==
Johan van Lom was the son of Johan van Lom and Elizabeth (Lisbeth) van Stalbergen, daughter of Gerart van Stalbergen and Aleidis van Eijll. seems to have married twice. Possibly to one Catherine van Eijll, and definitely to Margaret van Vernich, widow of Herman Heesmans. Molhuysen and Blok (1937) attribute all of his children to Catherine.

His children were:

- Johan van Lom (called Johan van Lom the Young), who married Eva van Bearle, daughter of Emont van Bearle (van Crieckenbeek) and Agnes van Eijll.
- Mechtildis van Lom, who married Dederick (Dirk) van Cruchten, son of Dederick van Cruchten and Catharina Hillen
- Catherina van Lom, who was a nun in the convent Klooster Mariëndal near Venlo, noted as procuratrix on 17 March 1540
- Gertruid van Lom
