= Matthieu Gerard Jaques Marie Kerbosch =

Dutch pharmacist and botanist (1880–1973)

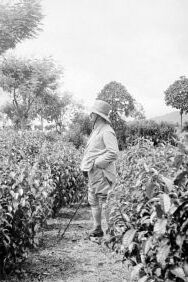
Dr. Kerbosch in a cinchona garden

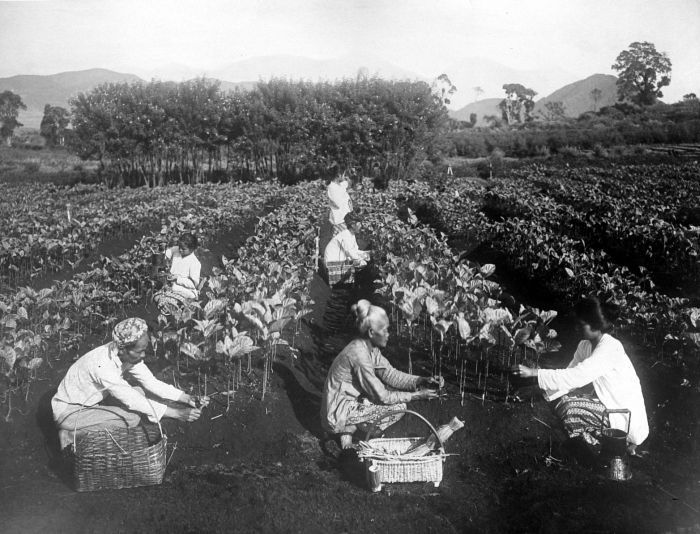
Grafting the chinchona-plant on the chinchona-plantation Tjinjiroean in the Preanger, West-Java. Photograph by M. Kerbosch

Matthieu Gerard Jaques Marie Kerbosch (1880–1973) was a Dutch pharmacist and botanist. He was known for his work on the cinchona plantations of the Dutch East Indies and for the Kinabureau.

Kerbosch was from Venlo in the Netherlands. He earned a doctorate degree in 1910 and began to work as a pharmacist. He was appointed as a government chemist in Buitenzorg. By 1914, he became the assistant director of the government cinchona plantation at Tjinjiroean. He became the director of Tjinjiroean and of the Cinchona Experiment Station at Pangalengan in 1915. Kerbosch owned a patent for obtaining rubber from Hevea latex.

Kerbosch retired in 1925. He died in 1973 in Soest, Netherlands. Roeland Kerbosch, the grandson of Kerbosch, later made a film about his life called De Heilige Familie.
