= University College Venlo =

University College Venlo, often referred to as UCV, is a bachelor programme offered at the satellite location of Maastricht University, Campus Venlo. It welcomed its first students in September 2015. UCV was ranked second at the national Elsevier ranking 2016 of all university colleges in the Netherlands. Furthermore UCV has been ranked as the #2 Liberal Arts and Sciences programme in the Dutch University Guide: Keuzegids 2020 with a score of 84 points, making it a top rated programme.

== History ==
Maastricht University, of which UCV is part, was founded in 1976, making it one of the youngest universities in the Netherlands, and as of 2014 have over 16,000 students and roughly 3,600 employees. University College Venlo itself opened in September 2015. It currently has around 250 students studying in Venlo.

== Academics ==
UCV will offer the students a Bachelor of Arts or Bachelor of Science depending on the courses in their personal curriculum. There are also two Master's programmes - Health Food and Innovation Management, Global Supply Chain Management and Change. The study is completely taught in English. Every student is, besides the courses, also doing several skill trainings and projects. UCV uses, as compared to the other studies of Maastricht University, the problem-based learning method taught in small classes. On top of that, UCV uses the research-based learning method, which provides the students with opportunities to collaborate with industry and local institutions. This provides the students with a more practical insight in their future careers.

Curriculum structure

UCV students have dependent on their chosen courses a life science, social sciences or interdisciplinary concentration. With UCM using the European Credit Transfer and Accumulation System (ECTS) a BA or BSc at UCM will comprise a total of 180 ECTS. Students subsequently enrol in a maximum of 30 ECTS per semester, or 60 ECTS for a full year, with students receiving 5 ECTS for courses and projects and 2.5 ECTS for skills trainings. Students create their own curriculum, with help of academic advisors, by choosing courses located within their respective concentration in addition to a requirement to complete a core curriculum. By choosing their own courses and concentration, students will be able to develop a good background for future jobs or for enrolment in a Master programme after they finished their Bachelor studies.

== Location & Building ==
UCV is taught at Campus Venlo, in a small building. This provides the students with a personal atmosphere and with close contact to the other Master studies and staff located at the same building. The location of Campus Venlo is close to the city centre of Venlo and is only a 5-minute walk from the Venlo Central train station. It is located at the Nassaustraat and has 28 on-campus student studios.

== Admissions and Student Population ==
UCV has two enrolment moments per year, September and February. Every prospective student has to write a motivation letter which will be followed by an interview. There are currently 250 students studying UCV. The student population is highly international with students coming from within and outside of the European Union.
