= Tegelen =

Village in Venlo, Limburg, Netherlands

Coordinates: 51°20′30″N 6°08′10″E

- Flag Coat of arms

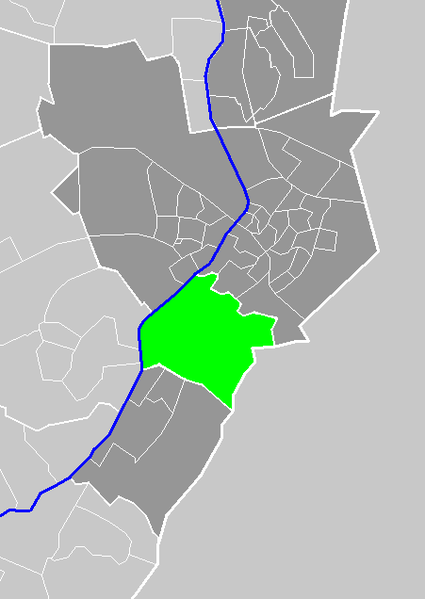
- Country: Netherlands
- Province: Limburg
- Municipality: Venlo

Area
  - Total: 1,040 ha (2,600 acres)

Population
  - Estimate (2006): c. 20,190
- Postal code: 5930-5934
- Major roads: A73

Tegelen (Limburgish: Tegele) is a village in the municipality of Venlo, situated in the province of Limburg, the Netherlands. It was an independent municipality until 2001, when it was merged into the municipality of Venlo.

== Tiglian ==
The name of the glacial stage of Tiglian (part of the Pleistocene) is derived from Tegelen because of the many fossils found there from this era in the local clay.

== History ==
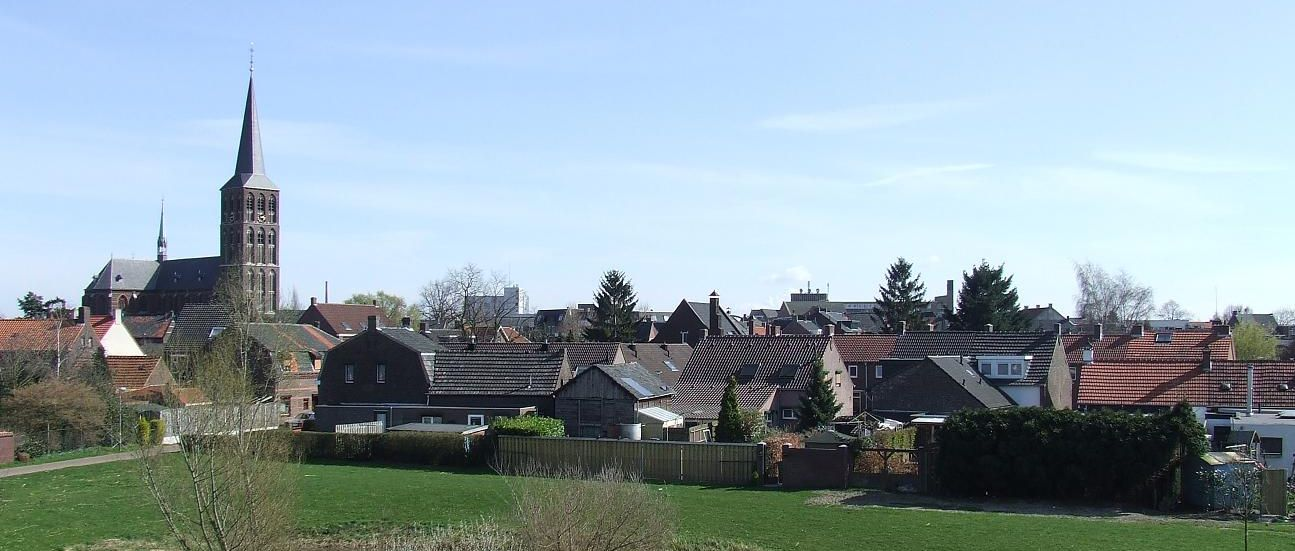
View of Tegelen

During excavations in Tegelen Roman pottery and tile ovens were found. The Sint-Martinus church is mentioned in diocesan and monasterial archives dating back to the year 800. Because of its strategic location, various castles and reinforced farms were soon established. The most important of these were the Castle of Holtmühle and the De Munt (Tegelen). During the Middle Ages, there were several battles in and around Tegelen, because of its proximity to the walled city of Venlo. Over time, a barracks was established in Venlo, and a fortification in neighbouring Blerick. As a result, from the 16th century until the 18th century Tegelen was regularly visited by plundering armies.

=== Part of Jülich ===
Coat of arms of the German municipality of Jülich

For centuries Tegelen was part of the Duchy of Jülich, while neighbouring Venlo belonged to the Duchy of Guelders. So literally, according to the people of Tegelen Venlo was "abroad" and vice versa. This explains the differences between the local dialects of the neighbouring towns and the rivalry between these parts of the city that persists to this day. The black, uncrowned lion on a golden ground, in the coat of arms and the flag of Tegelen can be found in the coat of arms of the Duchy of Jülich.

For Jülich it was very important to have access to the Meuse river. Tegelen, with its harbour at Steyl, was the most northern one, the other one being Urmond near Sittard. In Napoleonic times, the former duchy of Jülich became part of the Roer department. Tegelen, Sittard and Urmond were ceded to the United Kingdom of the Netherlands in 1815, resulting in the Netherlands finally obtaining complete control of the river from Maastricht northward.

=== Industrial activities ===
Flag of (the former municipality of) Tegelen

Early in the 19th century Tegelen developed into a regional centre of industry. At first, tile and pottery factories were established, and later that century, metallurgy and tobacco factories. After 1900 agriculture was added to the mix. Pottery and related industries were very successful in Tegelen from 1750 until World War II.

Economic and social life before that war was dominated by a small number of factory-owning families that would scratch each other's backs. One infamous episode illustrating the way they treated their work force and how they controlled their lives occurred during World War I. The producers of clay products claimed that the embargo on Germany brought them to the brink of bankruptcy, and the only way they could survive was to drastically reduce wages. The work force went on strike but soon the strike fund was depleted. The local clergy helped negotiate a settlement allowing labourers to return to work for a salary that barely exceeded subsistence levels. It later transpired that there had never been any risk of any of the producers going bankrupt, and that this drastic reduction in labour cost had allowed them to make exorbitant profits. This is still evident from the gigantic villas in which these families lived and of which a number are still standing.

After the war, the number of factories in Tegelen steadily decreased. All smelters, including Globe, known throughout the Netherlands for providing drainage covers, disappeared. There are still three operating factories producing clay products, all except Keramische Industrie Limburg, are now in foreign ownership. One chimney, previously owned by a stone cutter named Canoy Herfkens, is still standing as a reminder of Tegelen's industrial heyday.

In 2001 Tegelen was merged into the municipality of Venlo.

== Culture ==
The centuries-old expertise in ceramics and pottery is kept alive by courses held in the ceramic center of the tithe barn.

Tegelen has several theater, music and choral organisations. It is internationally famous for its Passion Play held every five years in the years that are divisible by 5, in Openluchttheater De Doolhof. These always attract many visitors. The same open air theater hosts Tegelen's Bluesrock Festival every year.

== Characters ==
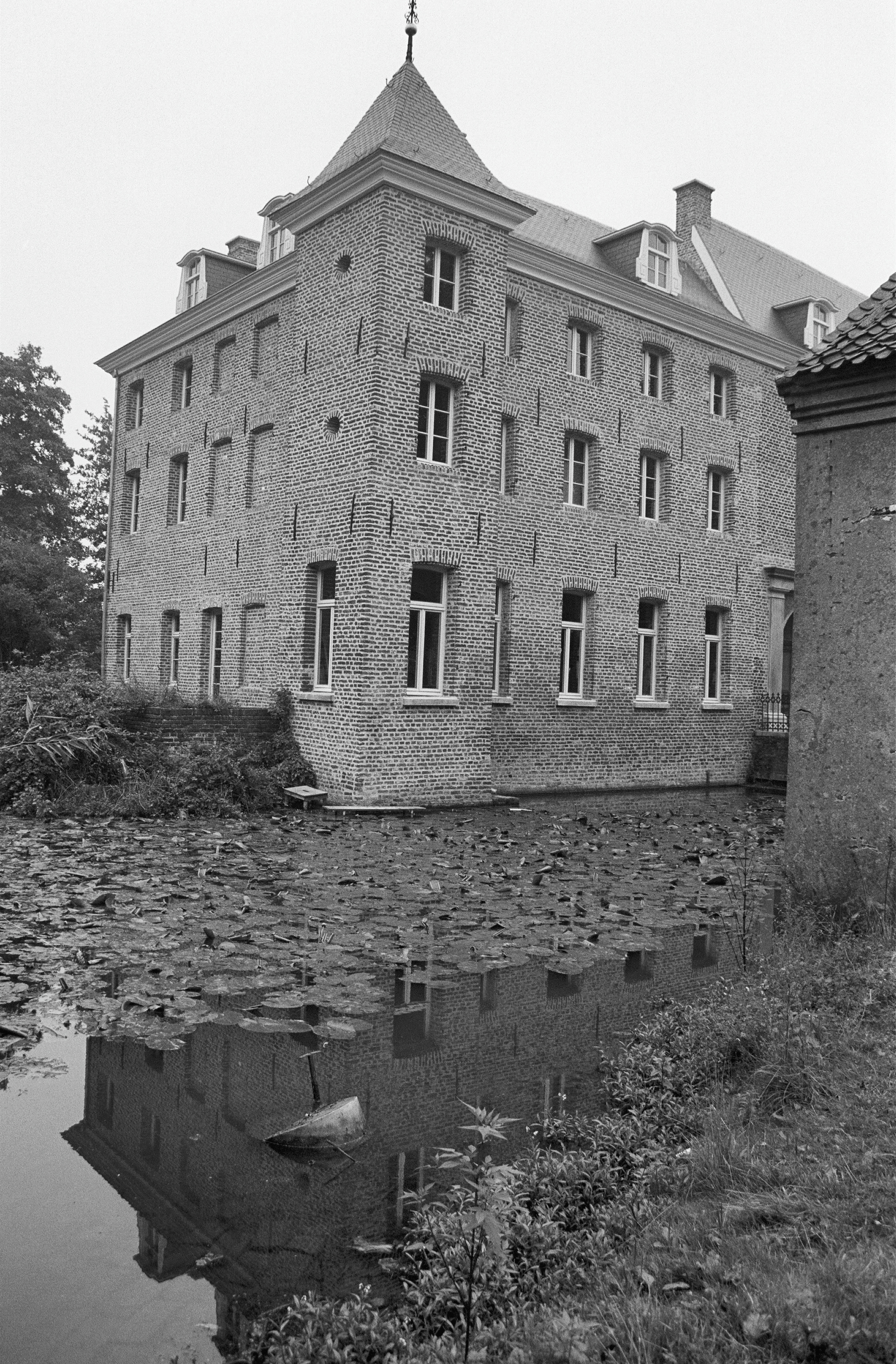
Castle of Holtmühle in 1988

Tegelen has had its fair share of colourful characters. By far the most famous of these is "Baron" Joachim Reinhold von Glasenapp, a Prussian aristocrat who inherited the castle of Holtmuhle in the 18th century. He loved the army life so much that he owned a privately financed army corps that fought in the Seven Years' War.

More locally famous, before the Second World War, were the pub owners "Joës en Petatte Nelke", Gustaaf Schreurs and Petronella Muller, who had a song written about them and a statue erected for them in the market square.

En as weej wir nao Tegele gáon,

dèn gáon weej nao Petatte-Nelke.
Dao drinke weej ’n sjöpke beer,
en hebbe weej ouch vuël plezeer!
En Joes, dae haet zô’n lollig vrouwke,
die duit t’r sôkker in, die duit t’r sôkker in.
Al in det beer, al in det beer,

die duit t’r sôkker al in det beer!

Translation:

When we to Tegele return,

We'll go and see Potato Nelke
Where we'll knock back a pint of beer
and have some good old fashioned cheer!
And Joës's lady is a joker,
She puts some sugar in, she puts some sugar in
Our pint of beer, our pint of beer,

She puts some sugar in our beer!

== Former mayors ==
- 1798-1806 G.J. Antoon Thijssen (function formerly known as Agent and after that, Maire)
- 1807 Balthasar Hasenbach
- 1807-1808 Willem Houba (Maire provisoire)
- 1808-1815 Jean Guillaume Kamp (Maire)
- 1815-1817 No mayor; Prussian
- 1817-1830 Jean Guillaume Kamp (function formerly known as Maire and after that, Schout)
- 1831-1836 Jan Josef Ronck (function is called Mayor from now on)
- 1836-1848 Peter van Leipsig
- 1848 Peter Kurstjens (acting Mayor)
- 1848-1852 Gerardus Johannes de Rijc
- 1852-1862 Louis Pierre Quillaume Hubert de Rijk
- 1862 Jan van Leipsig (acting Mayor)
- 1862-1868 Jacob Beelen
- 1888-1906 Karel de Rijk
- 1906-1921 W.R. Carel van Basten Batenburg
- 1921-1927 Martin Willem J. Coenders
- 1927-1944 Mr. Felix Marie Casper Pesch
- 1944-1945 Ortsgruppenführer Potthof
- 1945-1960 Mr. Felix Marie Casper Pesch
- 1961-1979 Mr. Eugène G.G.M. Rutten
- 1979-1981 Niek Goossens (Deputy Mayor)
- 1981-2000 Drs. Piet J.M. Visschers, final mayor

== Born in Tegelen ==
- Carla Beurskens (*1952), athlete
- Ronald Goedemondt, comedian
- Peter P. J. Driessen (born 1959), environmental governance scholar
- André van den Heuvel, actor
- Chantal Janzen (*1979), musical star and actress
- Nick Muller (*1991), vlaai manager
- Ted Noten (*1956), jewellery designer and conceptual artist
- Huub Stapel, actor
- Theo Thurlings, politician
- Ben Verbong, film director
- Sjors Verdellen, football player
- Max Warmerdam (born 2000), chess player
