= Maastricht University Campus Venlo =

Satellite university campus in the Netherlands

- Type: Problem-Based Learning & Research-Based Learning
- Established: 1999
- Address: Nassaustraat 36, Venlo, Limburg, Netherlands; 51°22′09″N 6°10′26″E
- Affiliations: Maastricht University
- Website: www.maastrichtuniversity.nl/campusvenlo

Maastricht University Campus Venlo is a satellite campus of Maastricht University located in Venlo, approximately 80 km north of Maastricht, Netherlands.

== History ==
Maastricht University opened a front-office in Venlo in 1999 to strengthen the knowledge economy of the North Limburg region. Based in the chamber of commerce of Venlo, Campus Venlo developed successful activities like a Studium Generale programme and the TEAM Venlo project. Due to the successful experiences from these projects, the decision was made to expand the Campus.

In 2009, the Campus moved to the building of Fontys University of Applied Sciences, to house its two new Master's programmes, Global Supply Chain Management and Change, and Health Food Innovation Management. Campus Venlo expanded the Campus with a bachelor's programme in September 2015. To accommodate the growing number of students, the Campus moved on 10 October to its new location on Nassaustraat.

== Location ==
The Maastricht University Campus Venlo is located on the edge of the Venlo City Centre. The location is close to the Venlo railway station, the Limburg Museum, Museum van Bommel van Dam, and CityCinema Venlo. The campus building "Raad van Arbeid" hosts 28 individual studios located on the first and second floor of the building.

== Education ==
Maastricht University offers two Master's programmes in Venlo, Global Supply Chain Management and Change, and Health Food Innovation Management and a Bachelor's programme University College Venlo. All programmes are offered exclusively in English.

=== University College Venlo ===
In November 2013, Maastricht University, the municipality of Venlo, and the Province of Limburg announced their plans to open a Bachelor's programme in September 2014, University College Venlo (UCV). This liberal arts college will allow students to obtain a Bachelor of Science or a Bachelor of Arts within three years. The course content of UCV will be strongly related to the strengths of the region Venlo: agribusiness, health food innovation, logistics, and Cradle-to-cradle design. Students are challenged to develop an innovation and valorisation mindset within this academic setting. The bachelor's programme welcomed its first students in September 2015. The Bachelor's offers enrolment in September.

=== Global Supply Chain Management and Change ===
The Global Supply Chain Management and Change Master's programme is a one-year programme offered by the Maastricht University, School of Business and Economics.

=== Health Food Innovation Management ===
The Master Health Food Innovation Management lasts two years, and is offered by Maastricht University, Faculty of Health, Medicine and Life Sciences.

== Student life ==
Venlo provides student sports, student discounts, and social activities.
