= Design Museum Den Bosch =

Museum in 's-Hertogenbosch, the Netherlands

- Design Museum Den Bosch
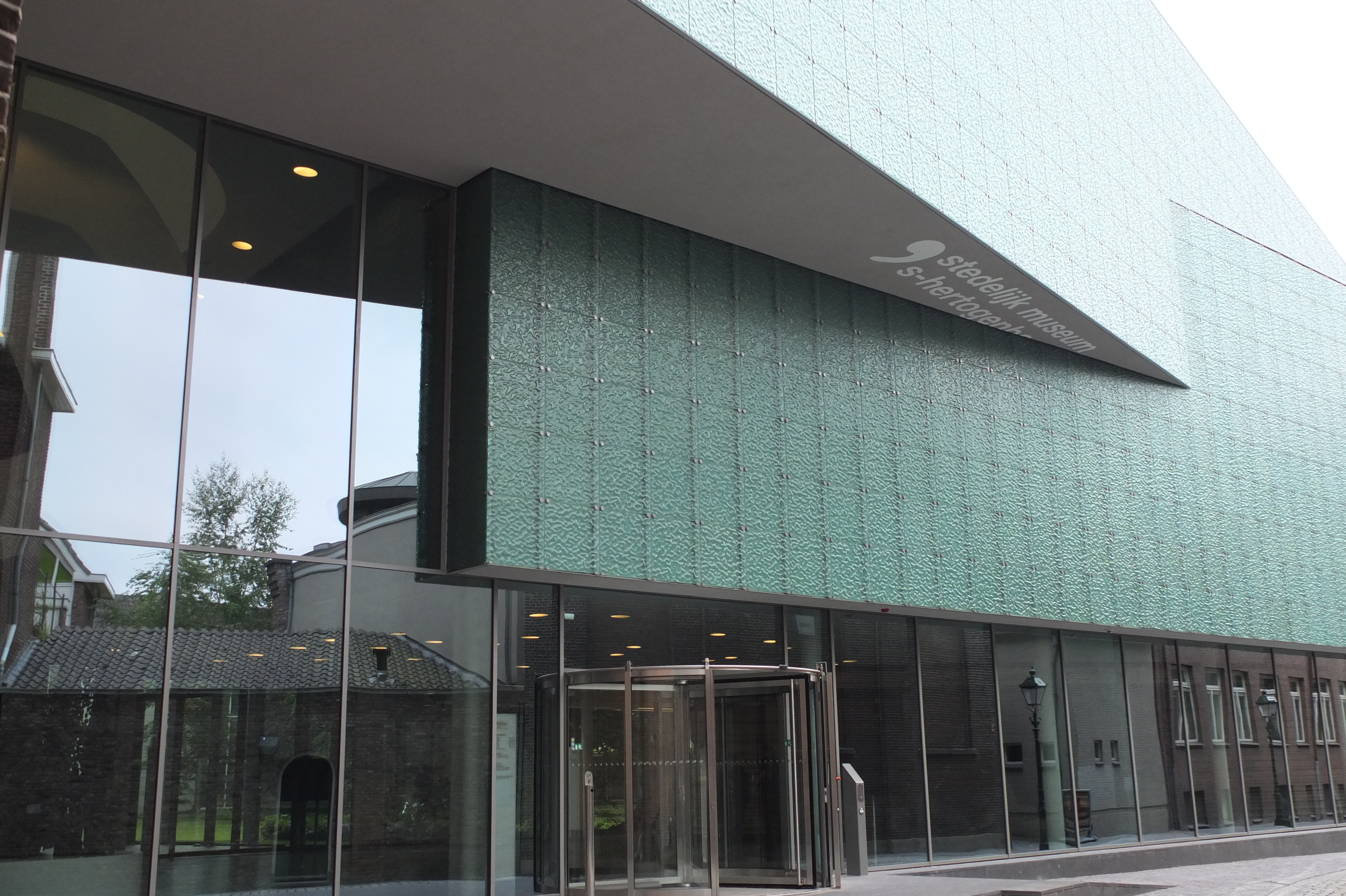
- Museum entrance in 2013

- Location within North Brabant
- Former name: Stedelijk Museum 's-Hertogenbosch
- Established: 1972
- Location: De Mortel 4 's-Hertogenbosch, Netherlands
- Coordinates: 51.686153°N 5.303792°E
- Director: Timo de Rijk
- Architect: Hubert-Jan Henket
- Website: https://designmuseum.nl/

The Design Museum Den Bosch (previously: Stedelijk Museum 's-Hertogenbosch, SM's) is a museum in 's-Hertogenbosch, The Netherlands. It focuses on the applied arts, in particular ceramics and jewellery. It is next door to the Noordbrabants Museum, which shows visual arts such as painting. In 2023, plans to move the museum to a new location outside the centre of Den Bosch were announced.

== History ==
The history of the museum starts in 1956, when the Royal Academy for Art and Design in 's-Hertogenbosch organized its first international exhibition. At about the same time, a study collection of ceramic objects was started. This led to the creation of the Municipal Exhibition Service or Gemeentelijke Tentoonstellingsdienst, which was made independent in 1972. This service was then based in the Kruithuis. The Kruithuis also came to house the 'Foundation for Visual Arts Loans', or Stichting Uitleen Beeldende Kunst. The Ceramics collection was moved to the Kruithuis, and moved into storage in1981. The name became 'Museum het Kruithuis'. In 1988 the museum started to collect jewellery. This became an international collection going back to 1950.

In 1985 the museum officially became a Museum of Contemporary Art. A process of professionalization then started. The international exhibition program became more focused and ambitious. The number of events, like guided tours, presentations and excursions increased, and so did the number of visitors.

By 1990 the Kruithuis had become too small due to the growth of the collection, and the professionalization of the organization. In 1994 the municipality of 's-Hertogenbosch then decided to expand the museum at the place where it was located. A new building was designed, which would integrate the Kruithuis. While waiting for completion, the museum and art loan moved to the Hekellaan, somewhat to the south. Many protests then succeeded in cancelling the design by architect Bořek Šípek. In 2002 the municipal government decided to cancel the plans at the Kruithuis, and to look for a location in the city center. This caused that from 2003 to 2013 the museum was located in an old commercial building in the Palace Quarter southwest of the Railway station. The Foundation for Visual Arts Loans did not move to the Palace Quarter, but moved to a building on Hinthamerstraat.

== The Design Museum Today ==
In 2013 the Design Museum moved to a new building on the current location. It was designed by Hubert-Jan Henket. The building is situated behind the Noordbrabants Museum — a corridor connects the two buildings.

In June 2018 the museum changed its name to Design Museum Den Bosch. It now focuses on the societal significance of design in the past, present, and future. In 2019–2020 it received plenty of attention with its exhibition 'Design of the Third Reich' (Design van het Derde Rijk)

The museum is a member of the International Council of Museums and the Dutch Museum Association.

== Jewellery ==
The Design Museum is one of the most important institutes to collect and present the work of Dutch jewellery designers. It has a collection of about 1,500 pieces of jewellery. The collection was started by Yvonne Joris, former director of the museum and is limited to the period from World War II till the present. It focuses on Dutch and American jewellers.

The museum maintains the archives of Gijs Bakker, Marion Herbst and Emmy van Leersum. The collection has jewellry by Arman, Jean Arp, César Baldaccini, Louise Bourgeois, Georges Braque, Alexander Calder, Jean Cocteau, André Derain, Max Ernst, Lucio Fontana, Meret Oppenheim, Pablo Picasso, Man Ray, Rob Scholte and Carel Visser.
