= Ronald Goedemondt =

Dutch comedian (born 1975)

- Born: 12 June 1975 (age 51); Tegelen, The Netherlands

Comedy career
- Years active: 1999–present
- Medium: Stand-up, television
- Website: ronaldgoedemondt.nl

Ronald Goedemondt (born 12 June 1975) is a Dutch comedian and actor.

== Biography ==
Goedemondt was born in Tegelen in Limburg, but he moved to Eindhoven after four years. His father is Dutch, while his mother is of Italian descent. He studied the HEAO communication.

In 1999, he started with stand-up comedy. He is part of a Dutch group of stand-up comedians called Comedytrain. He won both the audience award and the jury award at the Cameretten cabaret festival in 2003. In 2013, he worked with three fellow comedians on the sketch comedy show Sluipschutters (English: snipers), which was aired by BNN for more than one season.

== Programs ==
- 2025-2026: Mijn lieve achterdocht
- 2022-2024: Met knielende knikjes
- 2020: Numero Uno
- 2015–2017: Geen sprake van
- 2013–2014: R van Ronald
- 2011–2012: Binnen de lijntjes
- 2008–2009: Dedication
- 2007–2008: Ze bestaan echt
- 2004–2006: Spek

De tour van Numero Uno werd onderbroken in verband met de coronapandemie.

== Awards ==
- Cameretten 2003
- Neerlands Hoop 2008
- Edison comedy 2009
