= College of the Holy Spirit of Tarlac =

Roman Catholic college in Tarlac, Philippines

- Dalubhasaang Espiritu Santo sa Tarlak (Filipino)
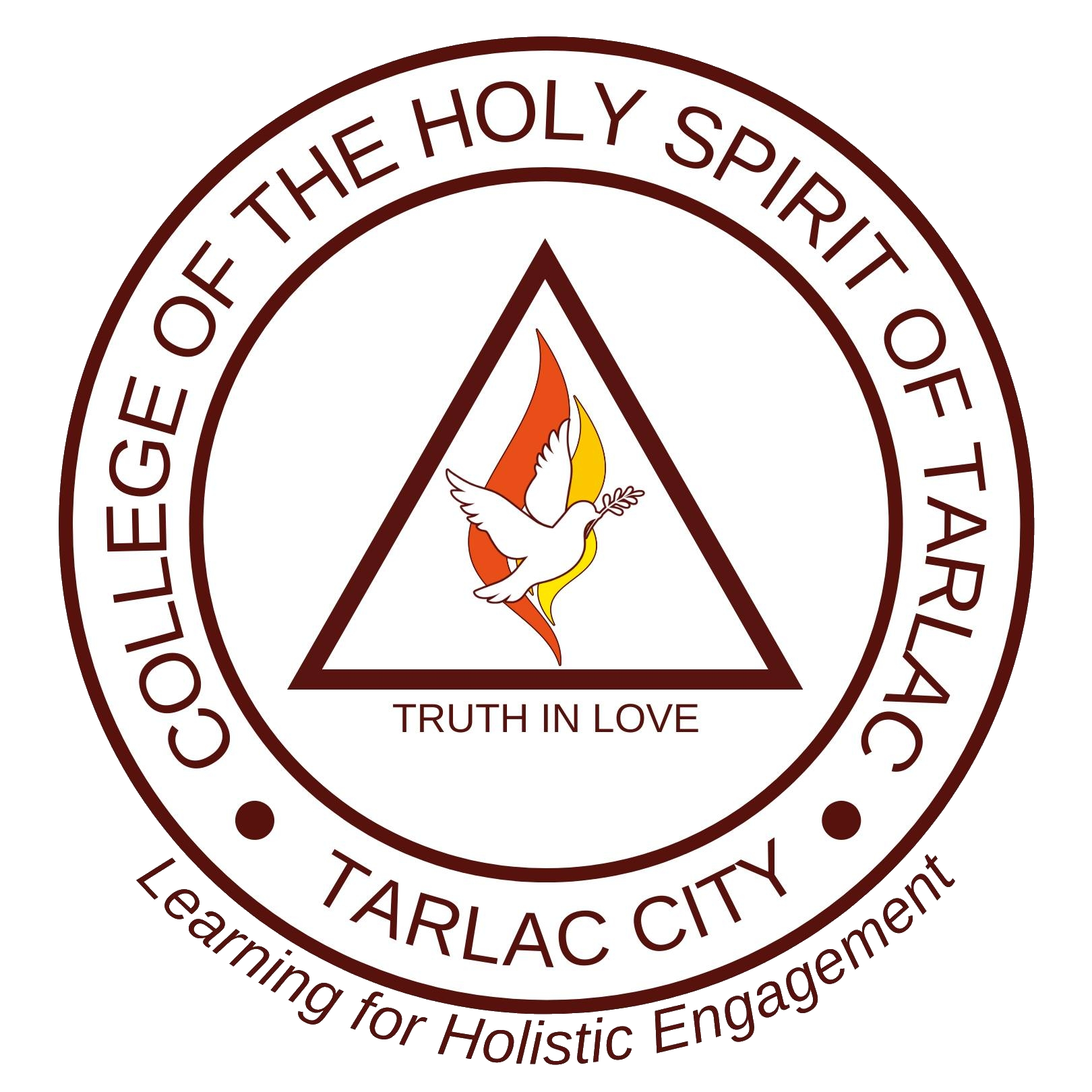
- Learning for Holistic Engagement
- Former names: List: Catholic Academy of Tarlac (1939); Holy Ghost Institute (1940-1968); Holy Spirit Academy (1940-1968)
- Motto: Veritas in Caritate (Latin); Truth in Love (English); Katotohanan sa Pagmamahal (Filipino)
- Type: Private, Roman Catholic Non-profit Coeducational Basic and Higher education institution
- Established: 1939; 87 years ago
- Religious affiliation: Roman Catholic (Holy Spirit Sisters (S.Sp.S))
- Academic affiliations: PAASCU, TCPEIA
- Principal: Sr. Genoveva R. Salva, S.Sp.S.
- Location: San Sebastian Village, Tarlac City, Tarlac, Philippines; 15°28′26″N 120°36′17″E
- Campus: Urban 3 hectares (30,000 m^{2})
- Emblem: Dove
- Patron saint: St. Arnold Janssen
- Colors: White, Maroon and Gold
- Nicknames: CHSTian (Official), Pirit (Colloquial)
- Mascot: Phoenix named Popoy
- Website: holyspirit.edu.ph
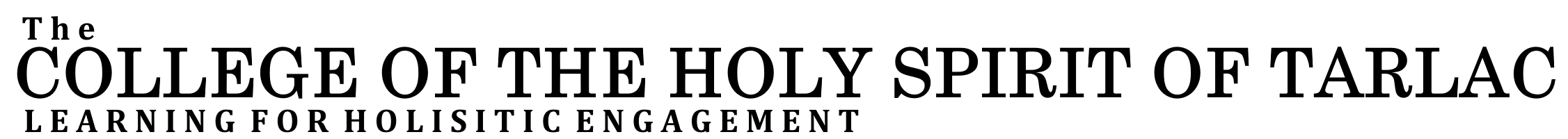

The College of the Holy Spirit of Tarlac (also referred to by its acronym CHST; colloquially, "Pirit") is a private, Catholic basic and higher education institution run by the Missionary Sisters Servants of the Holy Spirit in Tarlac, Philippines. It was established in 1939 as the Catholic Academy of Tarlac.

CHST has three buildings within Tarlac City—the primary, secondary, senior high school education departments are located in San Sebastian Village. It was originally an exclusive school for girls but in 2005, they started admitting male students, which resulted in its growing population.

At present, the college has a Level 3 Accreditation Status awarded by the Philippine Accrediting Association of Schools, Colleges and Universities (PAASCU).

== History ==
Founded by ten prominent men of Tarlac in 1939, the school was initially named as the Catholic Academy of Tarlac. In 1940, it was turned over to the Missionary Sisters Servants of the Holy Spirit (SSpS) and was later named Holy Ghost Institute and Holy Spirit Academy. The first college courses were offered in the academic year 1968. Eventually, it was renamed the College of the Holy Spirit of Tarlac.

All classes were held at its campus in Brgy. Mabini until April 1972. In July of the same year, due to its fast growing student population, a new building was constructed at the New Tarlac Heights Subdivision in San Sebastian Village for the College and High School Departments. The College Department occupied the entire building in F. Tañedo St. while another building in Brgy. San Sebastian was being constructed. Since then, the High School Department occupied the original building in San Sebastian.

S.Sp.S. was founded by Saint Arnold Janssen, a priest from Germany, as a religious-missionary community. He aimed to form a congregation of sisters who will serve as teachers to young girls, and to assist the missions of the priest.

== Historical sketch of CHST ==
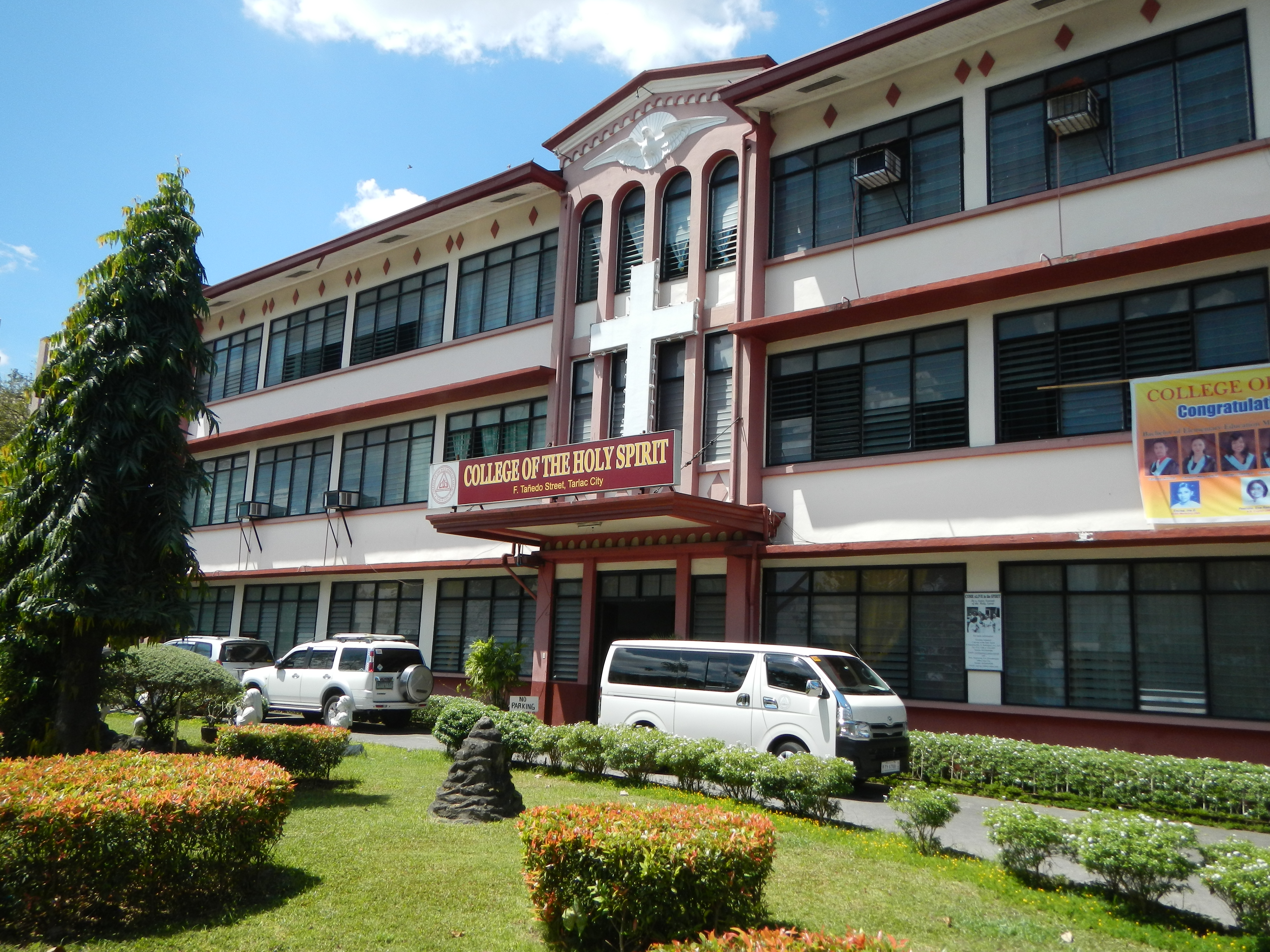
The façade of the College Department building in F. Tañedo Street, Mabini, Tarlac City.

In response to the need for foreign missionaries, a German diocesan priest named Father Arnold Janssen founded three evangelization congregations: the Society of the Divine Word (SVD) in 1875, the Missionary Sisters Servants of the Holy Spirit (SSpS) in 1889, and the Missionary Sisters Servants of the Holy Spirit of Perpetual Adoration (SSpSAP), commonly known as the Pink Sisters, in 1896. The first SSpS arrived in the Philippines in 1912 in Tayum, Abra, and then moved to Mendiola St. in Manila.

1939 – The College of the Holy Spirit of Tarlac is one of the best schools directed by the Missionary Sisters Servants of the Holy Spirit in the Philippines. Founded and named Catholic Academy of Tarlac by ten prominent men of Tarlac.

1940 – the school was turned over to the Missionary Sisters Servants of the Holy Spirit. It was thereby named Holy Ghost Institute and Holy Spirit Academy some years later.

1968 – the first college courses were offered and the school was renamed College of the Holy Spirit of Tarlac

1972 – Until April 1972, all classes were held at F. Tañedo Street in Tarlac Poblacion. In July 1972, because of lack of floor space due to the school’s fast growing population, the College and the High School departments were moved over to the new site at the New Tarlac Heights Subdivision in San Sebastian Village. The Grade School Department remained at F. Tañedo Street.

1988 – 89 – the Grade School was moved to its new site at San Sebastian Village, while the High School Department was left in the building formerly occupied both by the College and High School Departments. The College department once more occupied the building at F. Tañedo.

1986 – the Grade School Department had its first accreditation and was granted Level 1 – Deregulated Status until 1988.

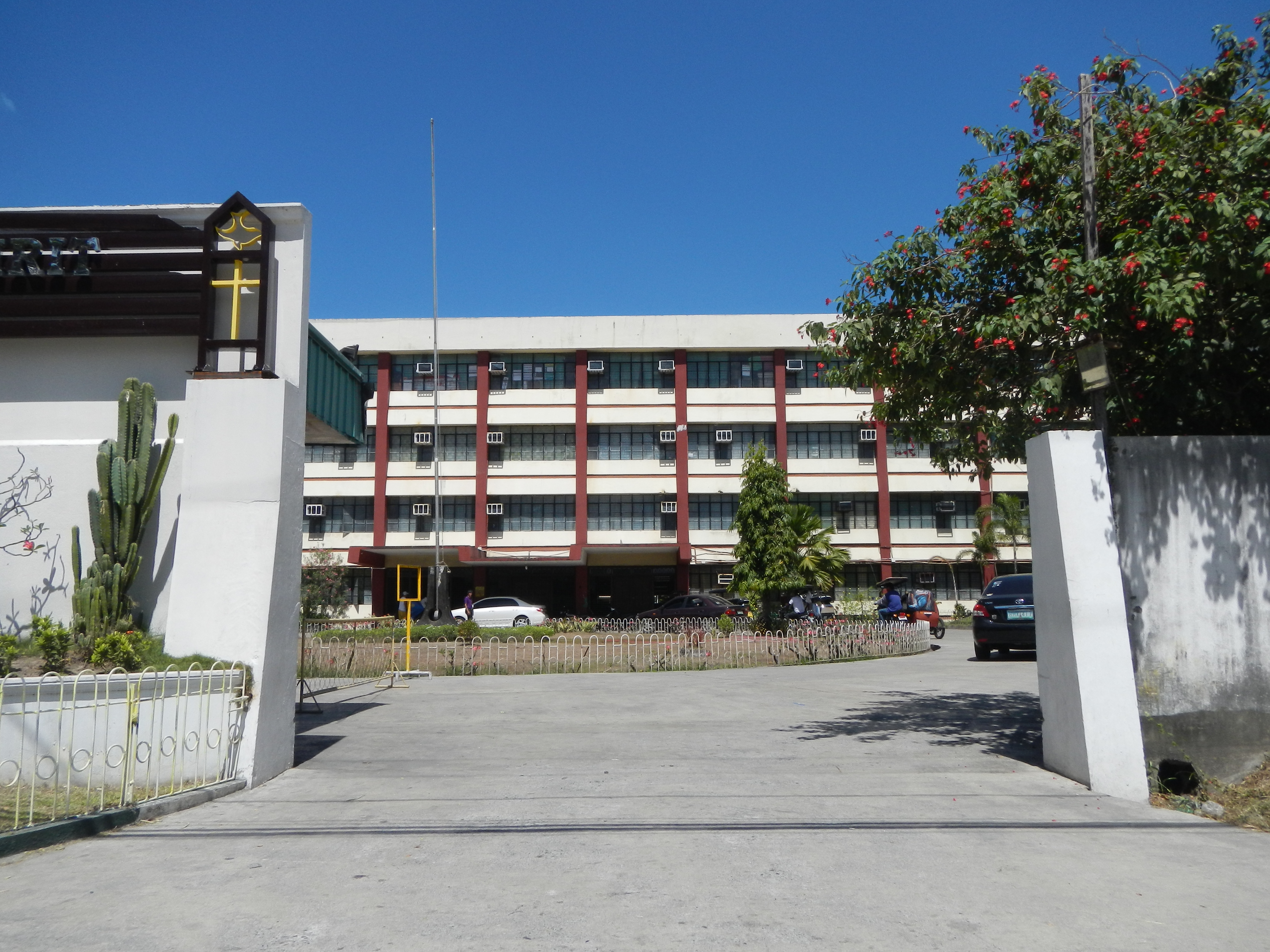
The entrance gate of the CHST Campus for primary and secondary education in San Sebastian Village, Tarlac City.

1992 – On December 11, 1992, the Philippine Accrediting Association of Schools, Colleges and Universities (PAASCU) awarded the Certificate of Accreditation of the Grade School Department for a period of three (3) years.

1996 – 2011 – It was re-accredited on January 19, 1996, and on October 19 – 20, 2000, respectively for a period of five (5) years, and another in October 2005, which granted the school another five (5) year accredited status in December 2005. The grade school has maintained its Level II status for a number of years, and awarded by the Federation of Accrediting Agencies of the Philippines (FAAP), a Level III Re-Accredited Status in December 2011 until March 2016.

1994 – 2016 – The High School Department, on the other hand, exerted serious efforts in preparing its clientele for college education. On August 31-September 1, 1994, it underwent self-survey which led to its formal accreditation by the PAASCU on October 14–15, 1996 and was awarded a Certificate of Accreditation for a period of three (3) years. On October 11 – 12, 1999 it was re-accredited for a period of five years, was revisited on November 17 – 18, 2004 and was granted another five (5) years in May 2005. It was again revisited in November 2009 and was granted another five (5) years in May 2010. The following year, in December 2011, the Federation of Accrediting Agencies of the Philippines (FAAP) awarded the High School Program a Level III Re-accredited Status until March 2015. On September 5 – 6, 2016, the Basic Education Department had its re-accreditation to maintain its Level III status and FAAP again awarded both Grade and High School Level III Re-accredited Status until 2021

2011 – 2018 – the school adopted the K to 12 educational system of the Department of Education (DepEd) which began in the SY 2011 – 2012 from the implementation of the Universal Kindergarten and continued there on from Grades One to Four and Grades Seven to Ten (Junior High School) in the SY 2015 – 2016; and fully applied in Grade Five – Six and Grade 11 – 12 from SY 2016 to 2018.

2015 – The institution opened its doors to Senior High School (SHS) which subsequently urged the administration to construct the first eco-friendly building in North Luzon named as the “Holy Trinity” building in 2015 and was completed in 2016 to house the first set of Grade 11 learners in SY 2016-2017 and the Grade 12 in SY 2017 – 2018.

2020 – The course offerings were later discontinued by the College Department. Bachelor of Secondary Education and Business Administration was the last program to finish in December 2020.

The College of the Holy Spirit of Tarlac maintains high academic standards and has formed graduates who have excelled in their respective fields of specialization, and who actively involved themselves in the religious, professional and civic activities, thus becoming assets of the communities.

The College of the Holy Spirit of Tarlac is a Catholic school that aims to Christian formation for all its students guided by Trinitarian principles of respect for uniqueness, equality, constant communication, unity and sense of mission. CHST states its mission to emphasize creating a learning environment for its student.

== See also ==
- College of the Holy Spirit of Manila
- School of the Holy Spirit of BF Homes Quezon City
- School of the Holy Spirit of Cubao Quezon City
- Holy Spirit Academy of Malolos
- Holy Spirit Academy of Irosin
- Holy Spirit School of Tagbilaran
- Holy Trinity Academy in Loay, Bohol
- Holy Spirit Academy of Laoag

== Related links ==
- Society of the Divine Word
- Missionary Sisters Servants of the Holy Spirit
- Holy Spirit Adoration Sisters
