= Hendrina Stenmanns =

German Roman Catholic co-founder of the Missionary Sisters Servants of the Holy Spirit

Blessed Hendrina Stenmanns SSpS
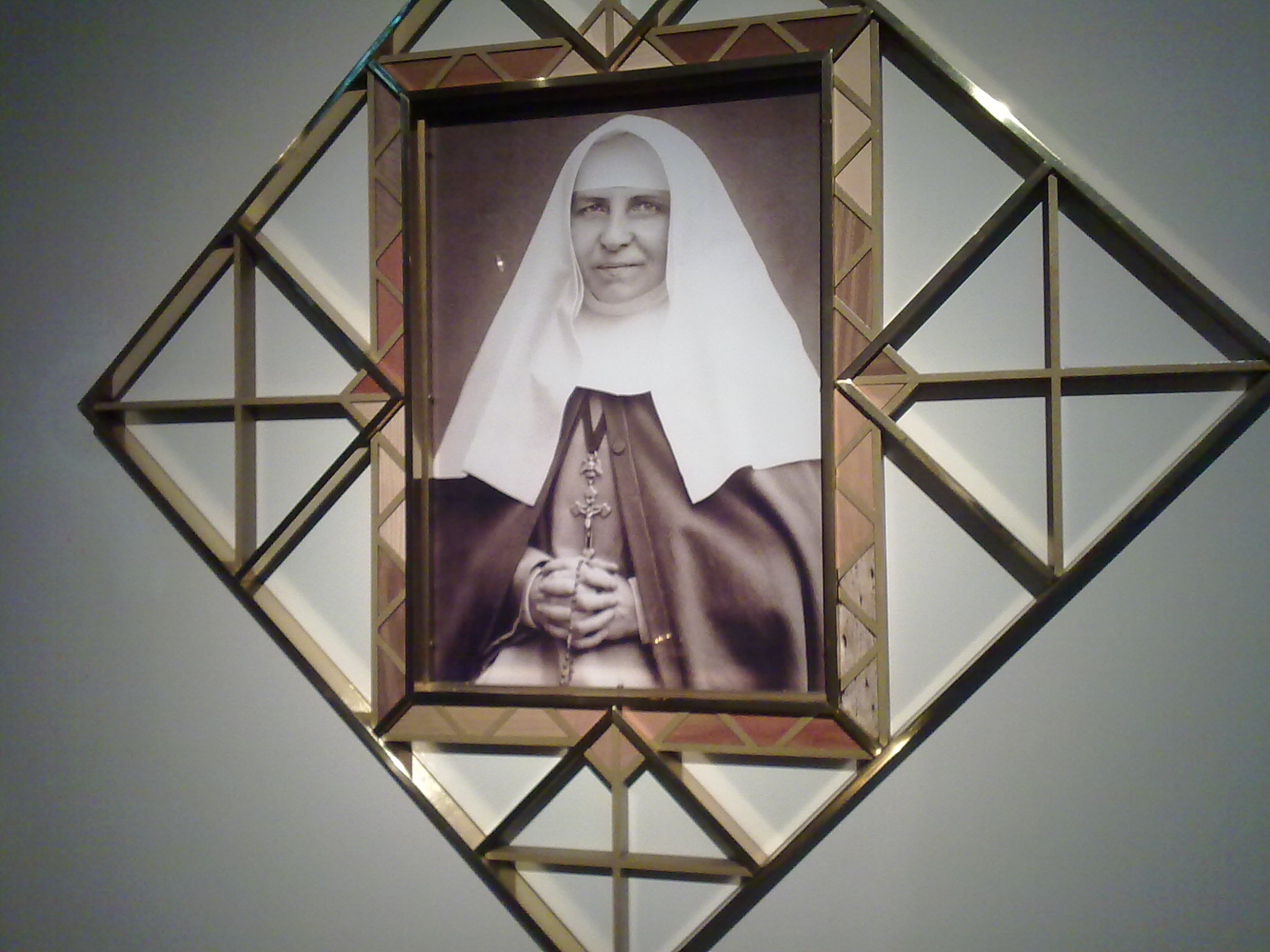

Religious
- Born: 28 May 1852; Issum, Kleve, German Confederation
- Died: 20 May 1903 (aged 50); Steyl, Limburg, Netherlands
- Venerated in: Roman Catholic Church
- Beatified: 29 June 2008, Doolhof Open-air theatre, Limburg, Netherlands by Cardinal José Saraiva Martins
- Feast: 20 May
- Attributes: Religious habit
- Patronage: Missionary Sisters Servants of the Holy Spirit

Hendrina Stenmanns, SSpS (Josefa in religion; 28 May 1852 - 20 May 1903) was a German Catholic religious sister who co-founded the Missionary Sisters Servants of the Holy Spirit, which she founded alongside Arnold Janssen and Helena Stollenwerk. She was also a professed member of the Third Order of Saint Francis since 1871. Stenmanns was beatified on 29 June 2008 in the Netherlands. Pope Benedict XVI delegated Cardinal José Saraiva Martins to preside over the celebration on his behalf.

== Life ==
Hendrina Stenmanns was born in Issum in the German Confederation in 1852 as the eldest of seven children to Wilhelm Franz Stenmanns (1821-1887) and Anna Maria Wallboom (1825-1 December 1878).

During her childhood she became concerned for poor people and for those who suffered and visited them with her mother to provide them with both spiritual and material comfort. Stenmanns worked as a silk weaver after finishing school - which she began in the spring of 1858 - in order to contribute to the household income. Stenmanns became professed as a member of the Third Order of Saint Francis in 1871 due to feeling called to live a life for the poor - but she harbored an ardent desire for the monastic life. An aunt of hers was a member of that order. The German Kulturkampf - which sought to subjugate the church to state control - made religious life impossible so she had to put her plans to become a religious on hold. She promised her dying mother that she would look after her father and siblings. This - to her - was a sure sign that she would have to renounce the religious life.

After a number of annual visits, Stenmanns relocated to the Netherlands on 12 February 1884. There she met Arnold Janssen who was in the process of establishing a house to train priests for the missions. Stenmanns felt called to support Janssen's work, and the priest accepted her request to serve at the mission house as a kitchen maid.

On 8 December 1889, she became a postulant alongside other religious and the foundations of the order she co-founded with Janssen and Helena Stollenwerk were laid. She entered the novitiate on 17 January 1892 and then received the light blue habit from Janssen in that same month. She professed her first vows in March 1894 in the new religious name of "Josepha". She later became the directress of postulants. She was appointed to succeed Helena Stollenwerk as superior in 1898. Stenmanns made her perpetual vows on 8 December 1901.

Stenmann's death in the Netherlands in 1903 was most unexpected to the congregation and the religious died of lung disease. She had suffered from dropsy and asthma attacks before her death.

== Beatification ==
The beatification process opened in 1950 in Roermond in an informative process that Bishop Jozef Hubertus Willem Lemmens inaugurated. The apostolic process commenced after the informative process concluded as a means of collecting additional evidence while theologians approved her writings as orthodox and not in contradiction of the faith. The formal introduction of her cause came on 2 April 1982 after the Congregation for the Causes of Saints approved the process. These processes received C.C.S. validation on 28 February 1983 in Rome.

The C.C.S. received the Positio from the postulation in 1985 and sent it to their consulting theologians on 23 October 1990 for their approval while the C.C.S. themselves approved the cause on 26 March 1991. Pope John Paul II proclaimed Stenmanns to be Venerable on 14 May 1991 after confirming that the late nun had lived a life of heroic virtue.

The process for investigating the miracle needed for her beatification opened in Brazil and after received C.C.S. validation on 4 February 2005. A medical board granted their approval to the miracle on 24 November 2005 while consulting theologians followed suit on 31 May 2006; the C.C.S. granted approval on 6 February 2007 while Pope Benedict XVI gave his official approval to her beatification on 1 June 2007. The miracle in question involved the 1985 cure of a Brazilian man with advanced colon cancer.

Stenmanns was beatified on 29 June 2008 in the Netherlands with Cardinal José Saraiva Martins presiding.

The current postulator to this cause is Ortrud Stegmaier.
