= Helena Stollenwerk =

German Co-Foundress of the Missionary Sisters Servants of the Holy Spirit

Blessed Helena Stollenwerk SSpS
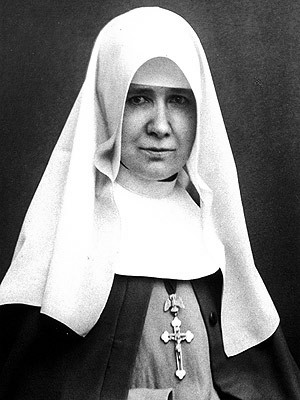

Virgin
- Born: 28 November 1852; Rollesbroich, Simmerath, Aachen, German Confederation
- Died: 3 February 1900 (aged 47); Steyl, Limburg, Netherlands
- Venerated in: Roman Catholic Church
- Beatified: 17 May 1995, Saint Peter's Square by Pope John Paul II
- Feast: 3 February, 28 November, (Diocese of Roermond)
- Patronage: Missionary Sisters Servants of the Holy Spirit

Helena Stollenwerk, SSpS (28 November 1852 - 3 February 1900) was a German Catholic religious sister who collaborated with Arnold Janssen and Hendrina Stenmanns and co-founded the Missionary Sisters Servants of the Holy Spirit.

Pope John Paul II presided over the beatification celebration for Stollenwerk in 1995 after naming her a Servant of God on 2 April 1982 and as Venerable in 1991.

== Life ==
Helena Stollenwerk was born on 28 November 1852 to Hans Peter Stollenwerk and his third wife Anna Bongard (b. 1827). Her sole sibling was Caroline (1855 – 13 August 1859). Her father died on 27 May 1859. On 24 November 1860, her mother married Hans Peter Breuer. Breuer had three daughters by his first marriage, and the youngest became a close friend of Helena.

Her childhood saw her occupied with the thought of joining the missions and going to China. She tried to find a convent that sent missionaries around the world, but her search was in vain.

In 1882 she met Arnold Janssen, who was in the Netherlands at the time, and he supported her idea of the establishment of a new religious congregation of dedicated women. For a time she served in the kitchen of Janssen's "St. Michael the Archangel Mission House" in Steyl. In 1884, she was joined by Hendrina Stenmanns.

On 8 December 1889 Stollenwerk became of postulant of a women's congregation established by Janssen, the Missionary Sisters Servants of the Holy Spirit, and on 17 January 1892 assumed the religious name Maria Virgo. She made her vows on 12 March 1894 and later became abbess on 12 August 1898. Stollenwerk also had a hand in preparing sisters that went out on missions across the globe; she sent the first missionaries in 1895 to Argentina and others to Togo in 1897. At Janssen's request she resigned from being Superior General on 8 December 1898 having been in that position since 1890.

In autumn 1899 she was diagnosed with meningitis. She died in 1900 and her final words were "Jesus: I die for You". Her remains were transferred on two occasions in 1907 and 1915 and for a final time in September 1934.

== Veneration ==
The cause for canonization commenced in 1950 in Roermond in an informative process that had been assigned the task of collecting available documents and interrogatories pertaining to her life and her time as a religious. Her writings received theological approval on 28 February 1983 from the Congregation for the Causes of Saints. The official start of the cause came on 2 April 1982 after Stollenwerk was titled as a Servant of God.

The Positio was submitted to Rome for their assessment in 1985 and the theologians voted in favor of the continuation of the cause on 23 October 1990 while the C.C.S. themselves likewise approved the cause on 26 March 1991. This allowed for Pope John Paul II to confirm her life of heroic virtue on 14 May 1991 and name Stollenwerk as being Venerable.

The miracle required for her beatification occurred in 1962 and was investigated before being sent to Rome for greater examination; the C.C.S. validated the diocesan process of the alleged miracle on 31 May 1991 and passed it to a team of medical experts for their approval on 17 June 1993. A group of theologians also approved the cause on 26 November 1993 and the C.C.S. gave their assent as well on 18 January 1994. John Paul II approved it on 26 March 1994 and beatified Stollenwerk on 7 May 1995.

The current postulator for this cause is Sister Ortrud Stegmaier.
