= Holy Spirit Adoration Sisters =

Catholic religious institute

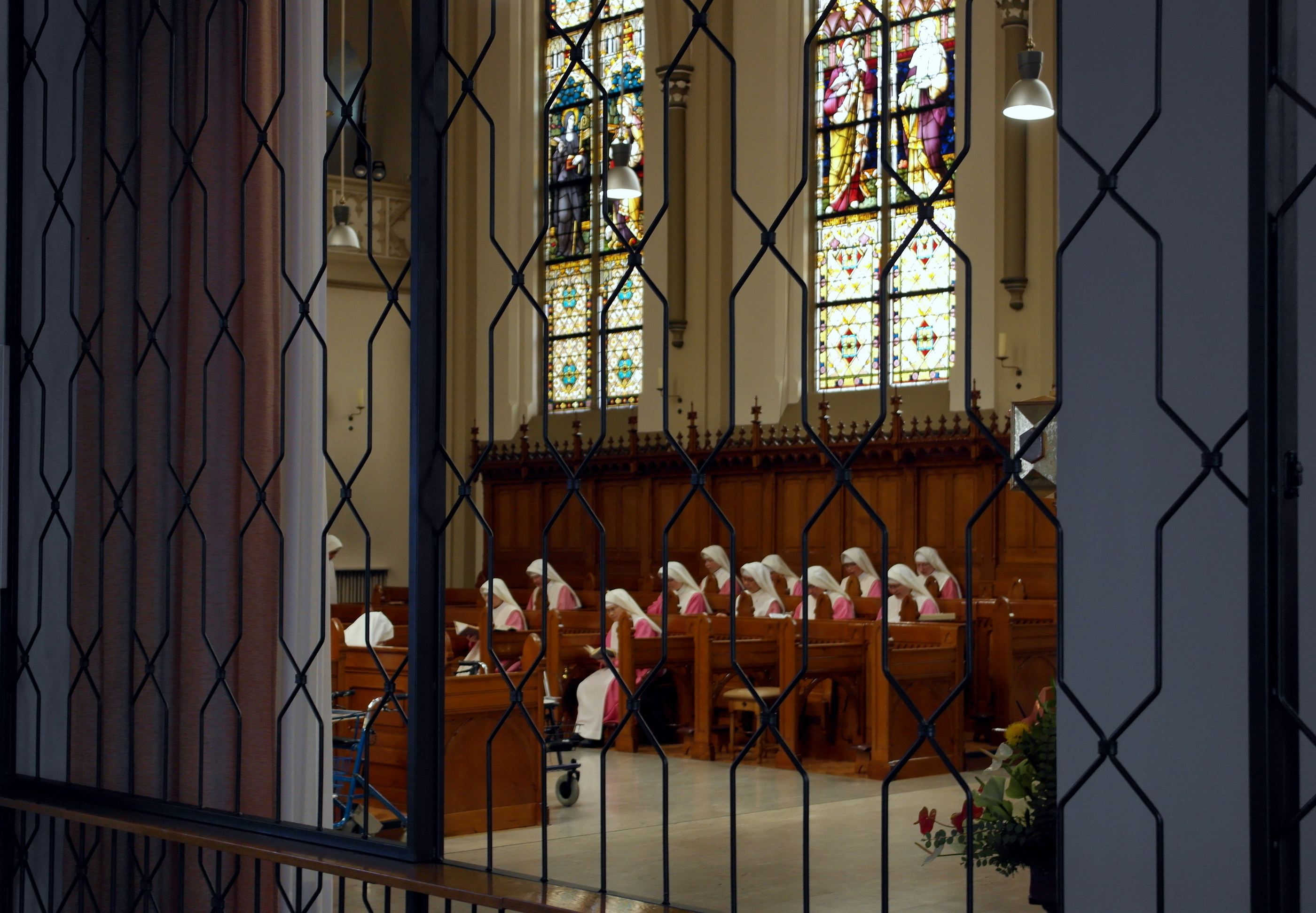
The chapel of the motherhouse in Steyl, showing the nuns in their distinctive habit.

The Holy Spirit Adoration Sisters (Latin: Servarum Spiritus Sancti de Adoratione Perpetua; SSpSAP) are a Catholic religious institute founded in 1896 in the Netherlands by Arnold Janssen. An enclosed order, the nuns lead a contemplative life focused on perpetual adoration of the Blessed Sacrament, offering intercessory prayers for the world 24 hours a day. The nuns wear rose-colored tunics as part of their habits symbolizing their joy for the Holy Spirit. From this they gained their colloquial name of the Pink Sisters.

== History ==
The congregation was founded in 1896 in the Netherlands by Arnold Janssen, a German diocesan priest who had first founded in the Society of the Divine Word in the southeastern Dutch border village of Steyl in 1875. In 1889, he founded the Missionary Sisters Servants of the Holy Spirit and later, the Holy Spirit of Perpetual Adoration congregation so that the missionaries that he had already formed could be supported by prayer. The nuns wear rose-colored tunics with their habits symbolizing their joy for the Holy Spirit; from this they gained their colloquial name of the Pink Sisters.

Mary Michael was Janssen's first Holy Spirit of Perpetual Adoration Superior of the Steyl convent. The first overseas convent was established in Philadelphia, Pennsylvania, United States in 1915 by Mary Michael (née Adolfine Tönnies, 1862–1934), upon the invitation of Edmond Francis Prendergast. Mary Michael grew the convents in many locations, where they continued to grow after her death on February 25, 1934 in Steyl. On February 25, 2015 the Holy See granted approval for the beatification process for Mary Michael. The motherhouse was later moved from Steyl to Bad Driburg, North Rhine-Westphalia, Germany.

== Presence ==
Currently, there are 22 convents located in Argentina, Brazil, Chile, Germany, India, Indonesia, the Netherlands, the Philippines, Poland, Slovakia, Togo, and the United States. They are supported solely by donations from visitors and other private parties.

== Literature ==
- Anton Freitag, Tabernakelwacht und Weltmission. Steyl 1918 (1921 2nd ed.)
- Anton Freitag, Tabernakelwacht en wereldmissie. Uden 1923.
- Burning lamps: Mother Mary Michaele: co-foundress Sister-Servants of the Holy Spirit of Perpetual Adoration, 1862-1934. St. Louis, 1968. 183 pp.
- Karl Müller SVD, Kontemplation und Mission. Steyler Anbetungsschwestern 1896-1996, Steyler Verlag: Nettetal 1996, XII + 532 pp. + Bilddokumentation, ISBN 3-8050-0374-9
- Karl Müller SVD, Contemplation and Mission. Sister Servants of the Holy Spirit of Perpetual Adoration 1896-1996, translated by Frank Mansfield SVD, 448 pp., Steyler Verlag: Nettetal (Germany) 1998, ISBN 3-8050-0419-2
- Josef Alt SVD, Journey in Faith. The Missionary Life of Arnold Janssen, Studia Instituti Missiologici SVD 78, Steyler Verlag: Nettetal 2002, XVIII + 1078 S., ISBN 3-8050-0471-0
