= Missionary Sisters Servants of the Holy Spirit =

Catholic religious congregation

Mission Congregation of the Servants of the Holy Spirit (Official Name)
- Abbreviation: SSpS (Servarum Spiritu Sancte) Latin
- Formation: Other Name: Missionary Sisters Servants of the Holy Spirit
- Established: 1889 December 8
- Founder: Saint Arnold Janssen
- Founded at: Steyl, Netherlands
- Type: Centralized Religious Institute of Consecrated Life of Pontifical Right (for Women)
- Headquarters: Rome, Italy
- Members: 2748 (2026)
- Congregational Leader: Sr. Miriam Altenhofen
- Continents Served: Africa, Europe, Asia Pacific, The Americas: Countries (40+) Communities (399)
- Affiliations: Roman Catholic
- Website: https://www.worldssps.org/
- Remarks: Ministries include education, health, pastoral care, spiritual guidance, adult education, communication, catechetics, chaplaincy work, social work, administration and interfaith dialogue

The Missionary Sisters Servants of the Holy Spirit, also known as Holy Spirit Missionary Sisters, Holy Spirit Sisters, Steyler Missionary Sisters or Steyler Sisters (Latin: Congregatio Missionalis Servarum Spiritus Sancti, SSpS) is a religious congregation within the Catholic Church. The group has 3,000 members in 46 countries. The congregation was founded by Arnold Janssen in 1889 in Steyl, the Netherlands. Janssen had previously founded in 1875 a male missionary congregation called Divine Word Missionaries. Janssen chose Maria Helena Stollenwerk, called Mother Maria (1852–1900) and Hendrina Stenmanns, called Mother Josepha (1852–1903) as co-foundresses.

This community of religious women is rooted in the Trinitarian spirituality.

== Founders ==
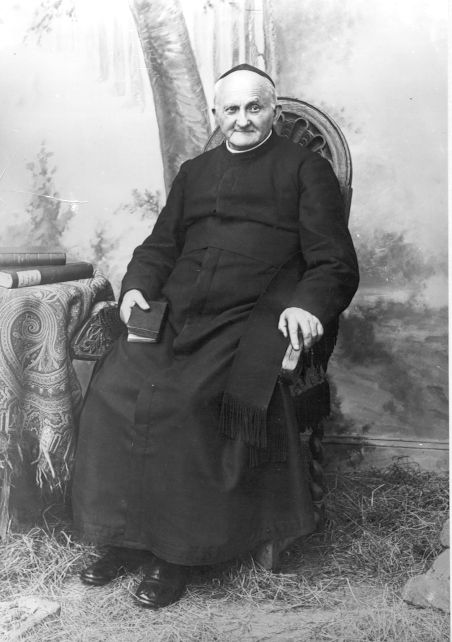
Father Arnold Janssen

Arnold Janssen (November 5, 1837 – January 15, 1909) was born in Goch, Germany, near the Dutch border and ordained a priest in 1861. In 1875 he founded in Steyl, the Netherlands "St. Michael the Archangel Mission House" to train priests for the missions. From this developed the Society of the Divine Word.

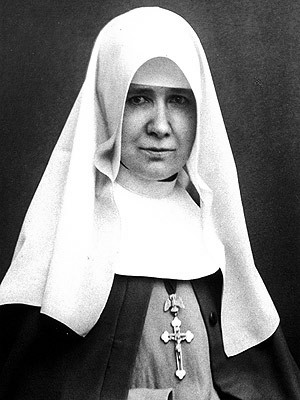
Helena Stollenwerk

Helena Stollenwerk was born on 28 November 1852. At a very young age she developed an interest in joining the missions and going to China, but was unable to find a convent that sent missionaries abroad. In 1882 she met Arnold Janssen and worked as a kitchen maid at St. Michael Mission House in Steyl. In 1884, she was joined by Hendrina Stenmanns.

Janssen perceived a need for female missionaries to complement the work of the male missionaries. On 8 December 1889 Stollenwerk became a postulant of a women's congregation established by Janssen, the Missionary Sisters Servants of the Holy Spirit, and on 17 January 1892 assumed the religious name "Maria Virgo". She made her vows on 12 March 1894 and later became abbess on 12 August 1898.

== History ==
The first missionary sisters set out in 1895 for Argentina. Others were sent to Togo in 1897.

== Ministry ==
Ministries include education, health, pastoral care, spiritual guidance, adult education, communication, catechetics, chaplaincy work, social work, administration and interfaith dialogue.

== See also ==
- Holy Spirit Adoration Sisters, the contemplative branch
