= Steyl =

Village in the Netherlands

Coordinates: 51°20′N 6°08′E

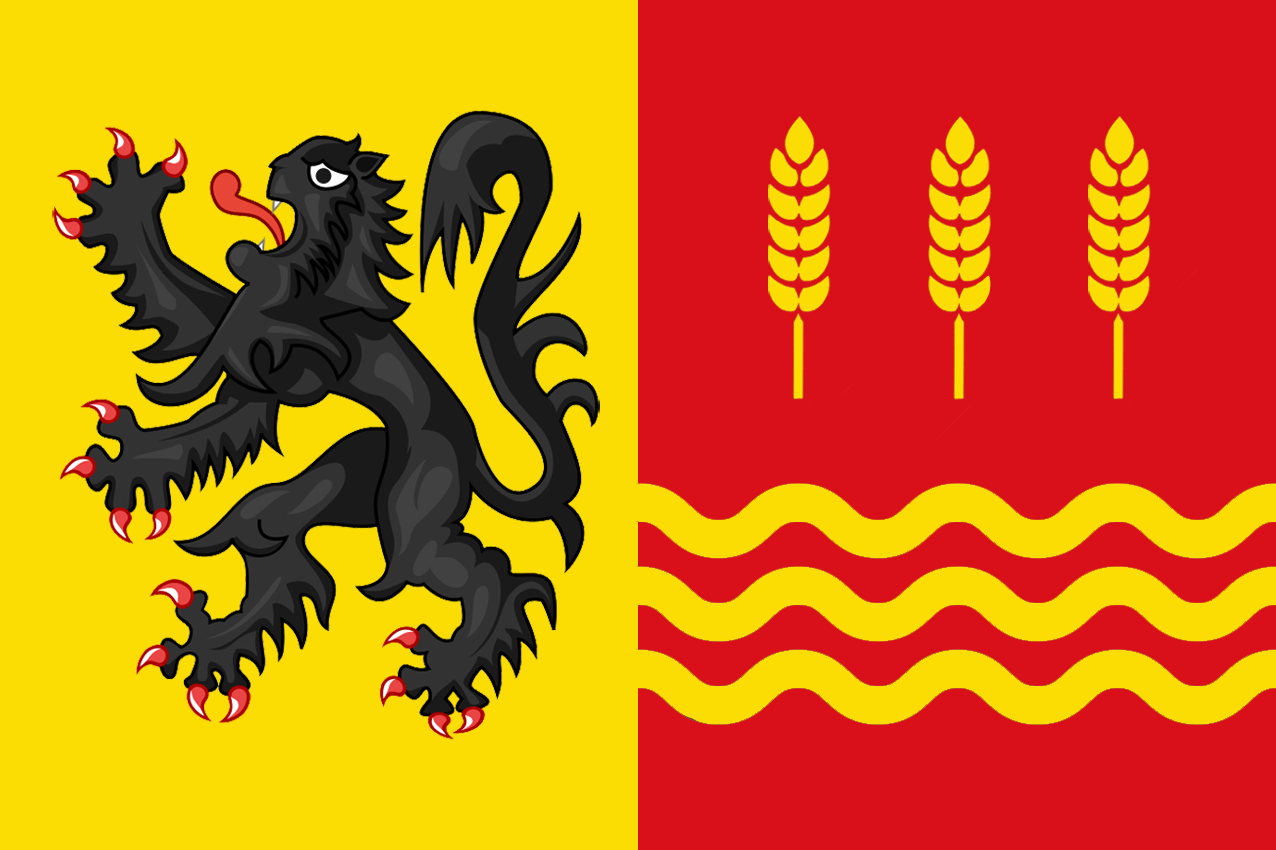
The flag of Steyl

Steyl (Dutch pronunciation: [ˈstɛil]; Limburgish: Sjteil) is a village in the Tegelen district of the municipality of Venlo, Netherlands. The village on the river Meuse is mainly known for its monasteries. In 2004, a section of the village including four monasteries was made a conservation area under protection of the Dutch heritage agency Rijksdienst voor het Cultureel Erfgoed (beschermd dorpsgezicht Steyl or kloosterdorp Steyl).

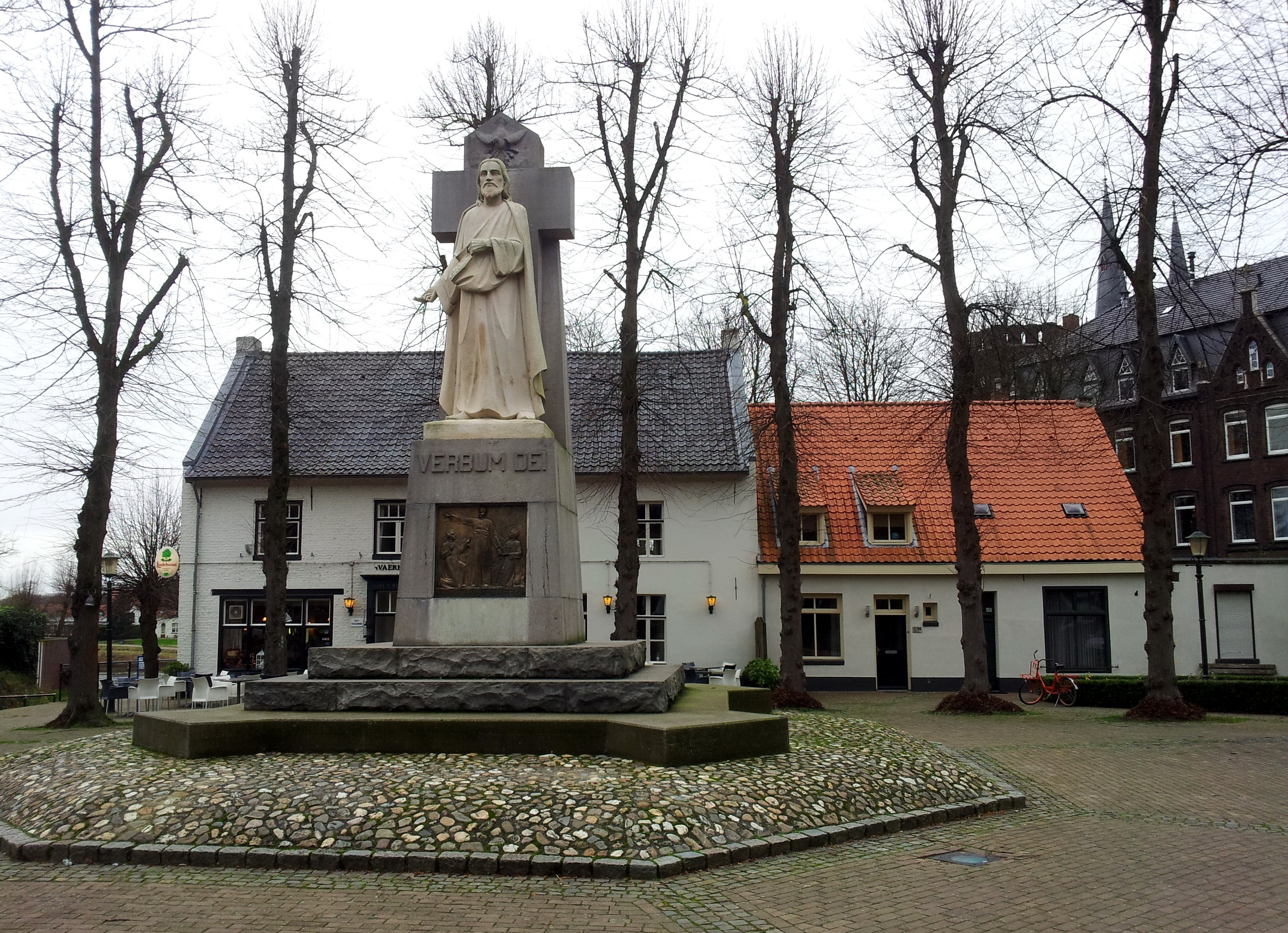
Village square with statue of Christ as Verbum Dei. To the left: the ferry and the ferry house. To the right: St. Michael's Monastery

== Location ==
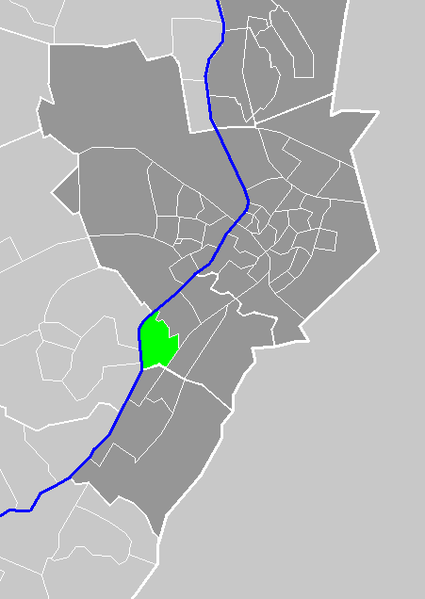
Location of Steyl in the municipality of Venlo

Steyl is situated on the right bank of the river Meuse in the northern part of the province of Limburg. It is located close to the border with Germany. A ferry connects Steyl with Baarlo. Steyl is divided into two areas:

1. Old Steyl: The old village, located west of Roermondseweg, the main road in Tegelen. Most of the old village is a conservation area.
2. New Steyl: A newer area, located east of Roermondseweg. This area is locally known as Alland.

In the past, Steyl often had to deal with floods when the river Meuse burst its banks. Major floods occurred in 1993 and 1995, when much of Old Steyl was flooded.

== History ==
=== Merchant village ===
In the late Middle Ages and modern times, Steyl was a port on the Meuse for unloading marl, wine, coal and other items for the Duchy of Julich. This brought wealth to local merchants, especially in the 18th century. Some merchants, such as the Moubis family, built mansions from the revenues earned by their trade (the Moubis estate). The port activities on the Meuse are now gone. All that remains is a small ferry service and the old ferry house, which is now a pub and restaurant. The Moubis mansion was sold in 1876 to a monastic community of German nuns from Münster, who then significantly expanded it (St. Joseph's Monastery). The Moubis wine warehouse was sold around the same time to another religious order of nuns from Essen (St. Gregory's Monastery). Thus, the merchant village of Steyl gave way to a village of monasteries.

=== Monastery village ===
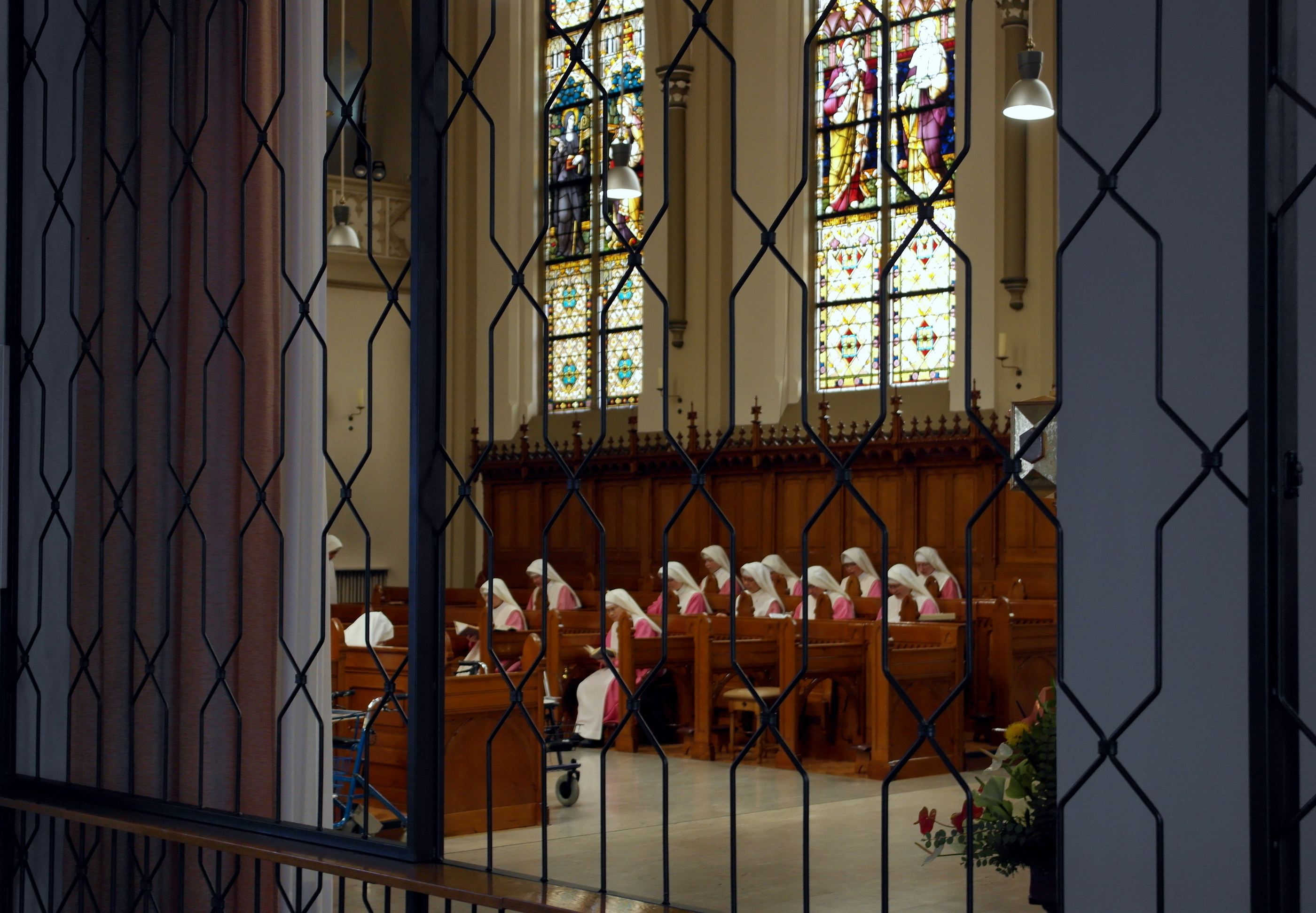
The "Pink Sisters" in the chapel of their motherhouse in Steyl

From the late 19th century, the village attracted religious institutions from five Roman Catholic congregations – each of which built their own monastery. Three of them were founded by the German priest Father Arnold Janssen. He emigrated to the Netherlands in the 1870s because the Catholic Church was put under great pressure in the newly founded German Empire of Chancellor Otto von Bismarck (see: Kulturkampf). Janssen founded in Steyl the Society of the Divine Word (Latin: Societas Verbi Divini, SVD), a worldwide catholic missionary congregation. Today the congregation is active in more than 70 countries. The monastic family founded by Janssen in Steyl includes two congregations for women, one for missionary sisters (Missionary Sisters Servants of the Holy Spirit, SSpS, or "Blue Sisters") and one contemplative order (Holy Spirit Adoration Sisters, SSpSAP, or "Pink Sisters"). Two other congregations of sisters have left Steyl, one in the late 19th, the other in the late 20th century. Father Arnold Janssen was canonized on October 5, 2003, in Rome by Pope John Paul II.

=== Parish ===
The village was a rectory until early last century. Not until 1933 was Steyl elevated to the status of an independent parish by Bishop Lemmens of the Roman Catholic Diocese of Roermond. In order to make room for the expansion of the monasteries, the parish church was rebuilt further east. Today it is no longer in use as such but houses a militia museum.

== Places of interest ==
=== Monasteries ===
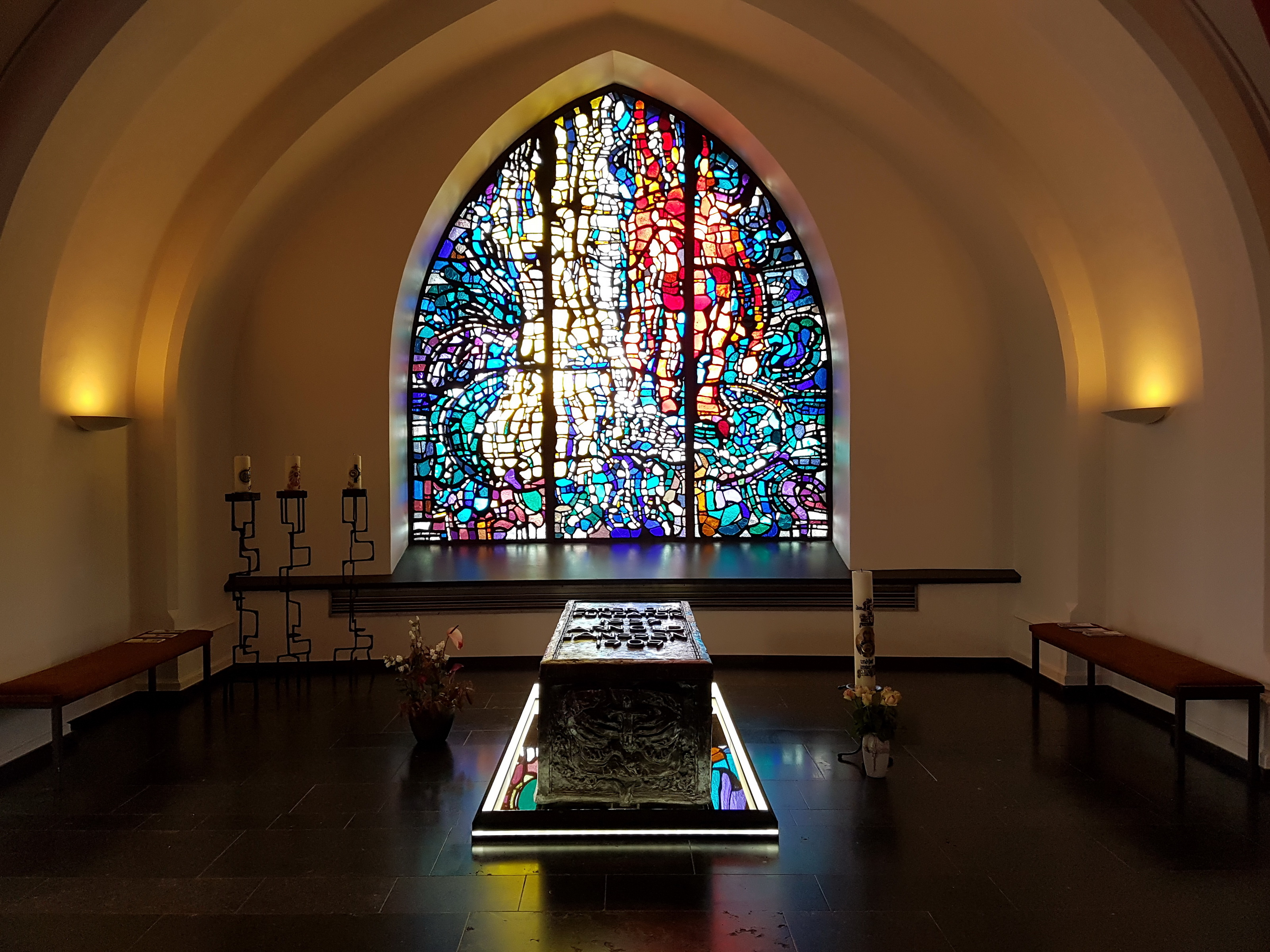
Tomb of Saint Arnold in the lower chapel of St. Michael's Monastery

The 3 monasteries founded by Arnold Janssen are still active today, all 3 functioning as motherhouses for their respective religious orders. The oldest is St. Michael's Monastery (Missiehuis St. Michaël), a large brick building begun in 1880. The tall twin towers of the double chapel can be seen from afar. The lower chapel contains the sarcophagus of Saint Arnold Janssen and is open to visitors. Two buildings formerly used by the Missionaries of Steyl, St. Gregory's Monastery and the print shops, both across the road from the main building, now house a range of museums.

The Sacred Heart Monastery is the motherhouse of the "Blue Nuns", a large brick building built in 1902–04, surrounded by gardens. The double chapel can be visited on request. The Holy Ghost Monastery was built in 1914 as the motherhouse of the "Pink Nuns". The chapel of these cloistered nuns is used for perpetual adoration of the Blessed Sacrament. It is off-bound to visitors but can be observed from an annex chapel, separated by a grid from the main chapel.

The former Monastery of Saint Joseph was partly housed in an 18th-century merchant's mansion, Villa Moubis. The Sisters of Divine Providence abandoned the monastery in 1994. It is now a residential area not open to visitors.

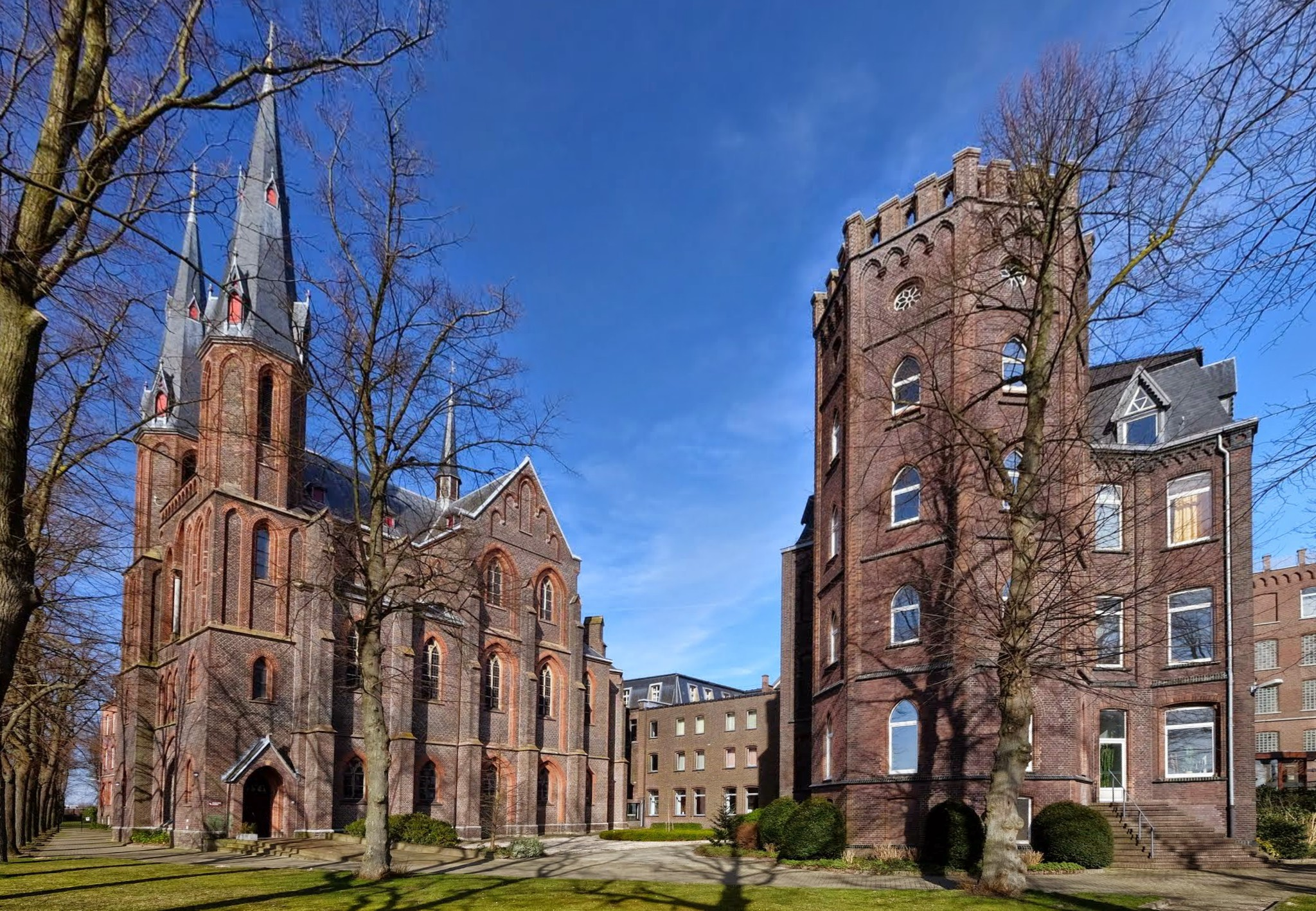
St. Michael's Monastery

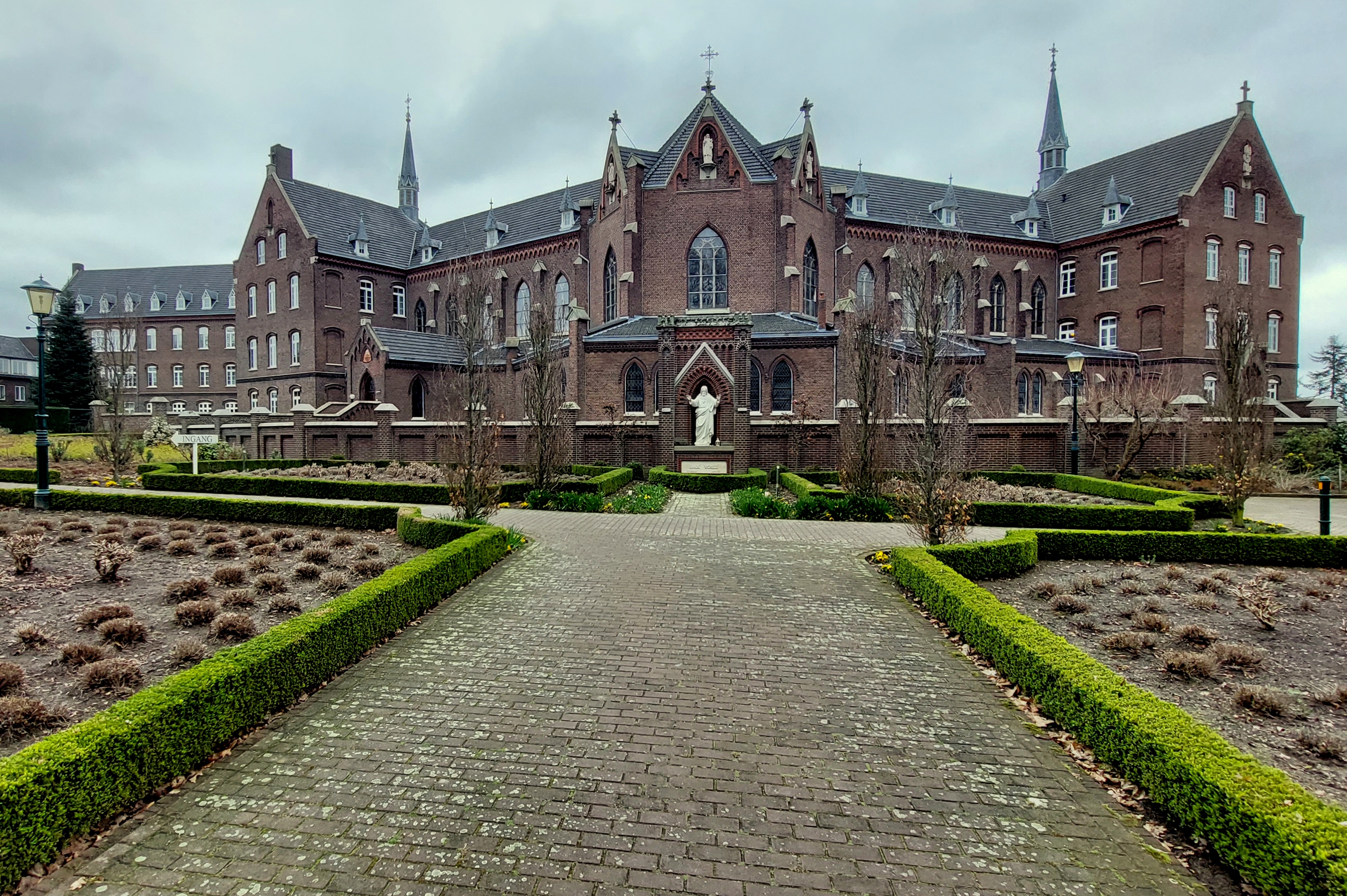
Sacred Heart Monastery

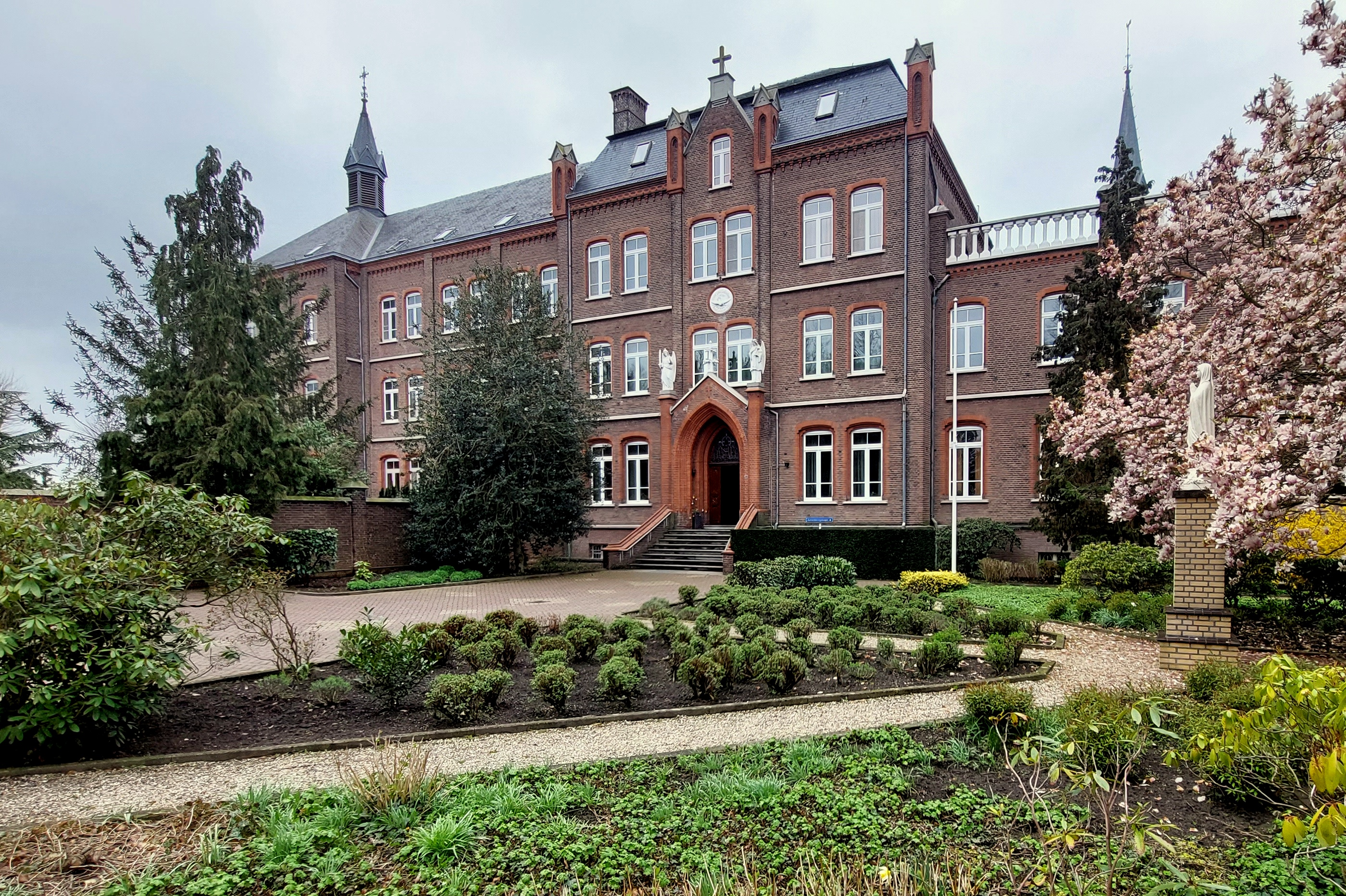
Holy Ghost Monastery

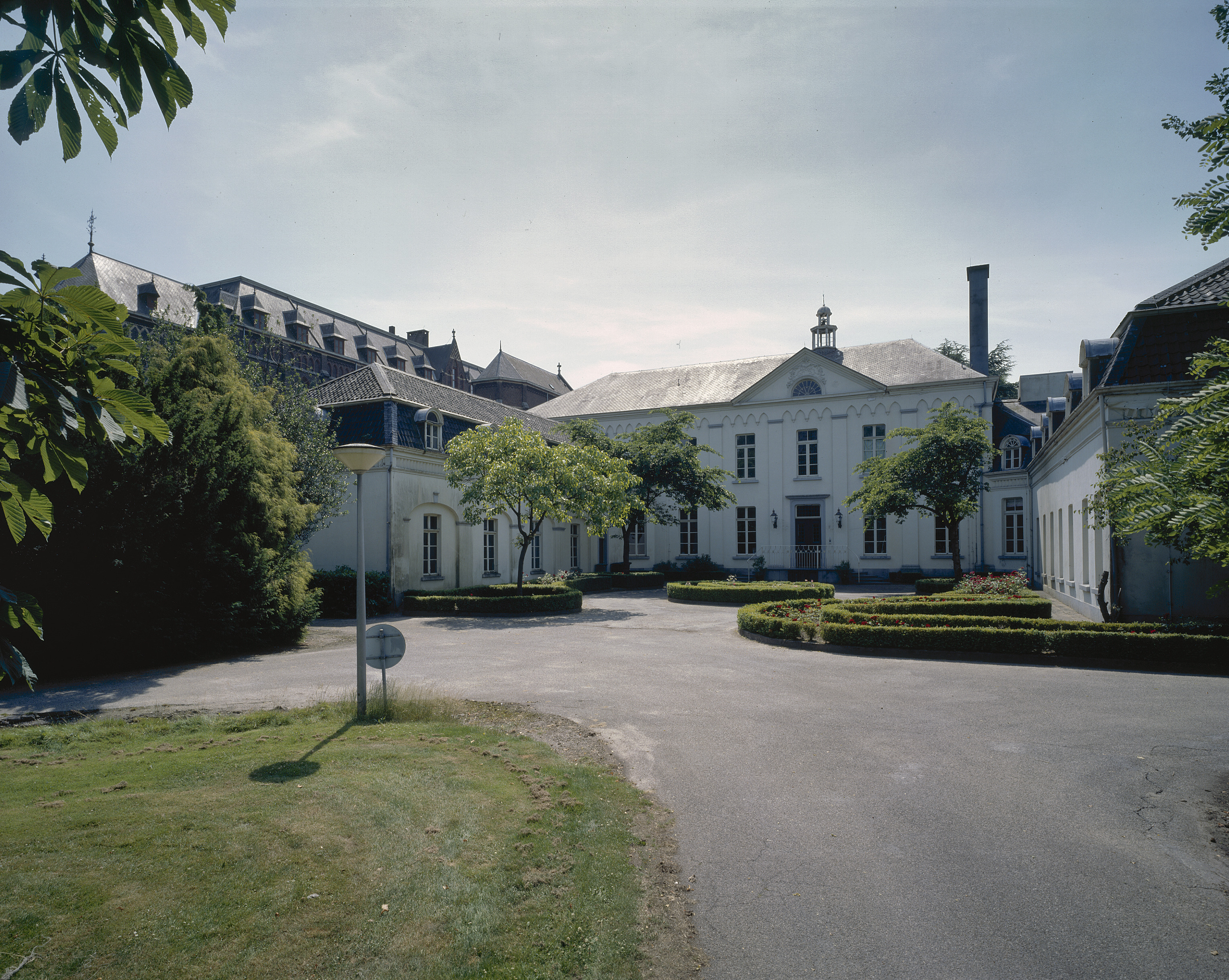
Villa Moubis

=== Gardens ===
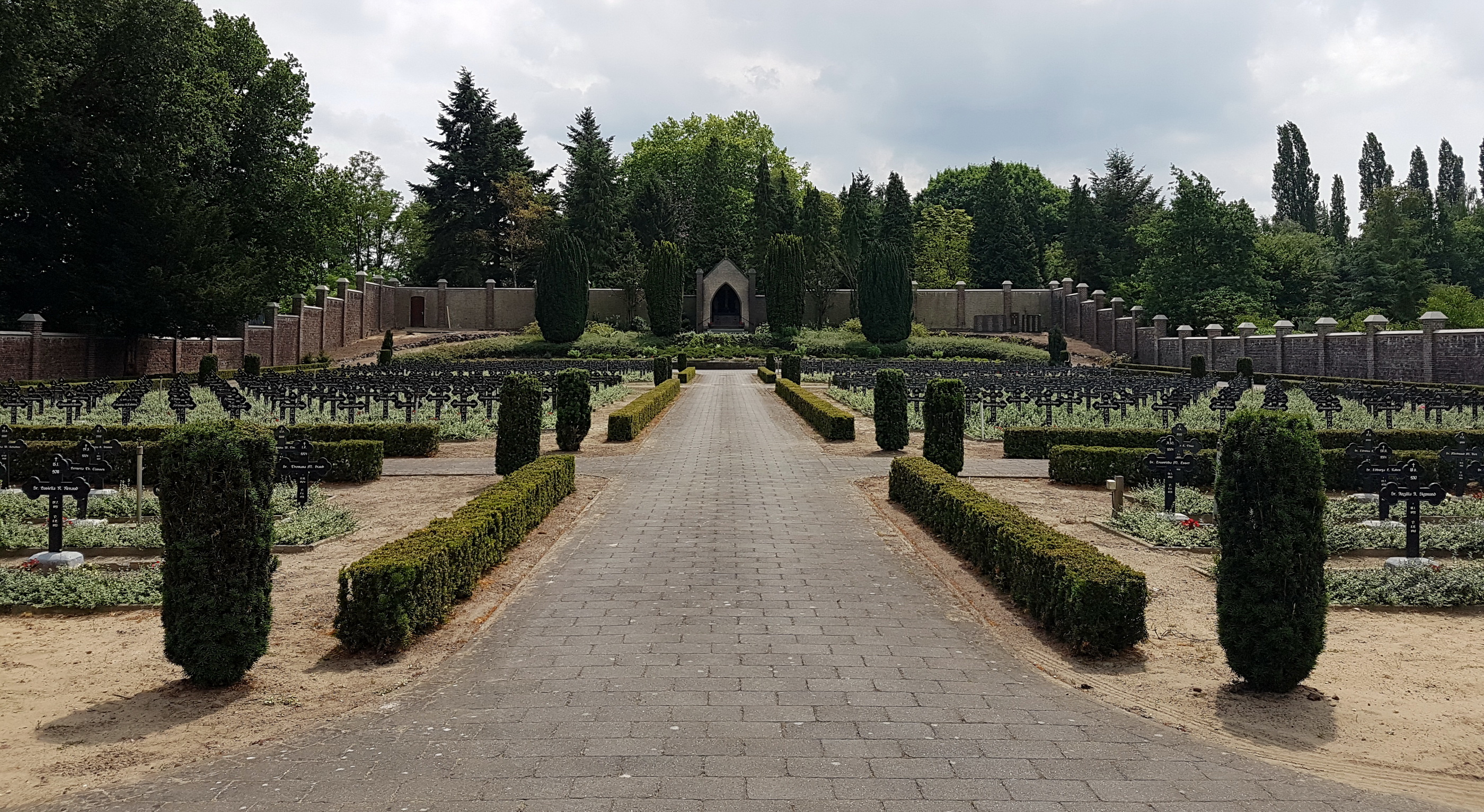
Cemetery of the "Blue Nuns" (Sacred Heart Monastery)

The monasteries in Steyl are surrounded by large gardens which are partly used as vegetable gardens and fruit orchards, including several greenhouses. Other parts of the gardens function as recreational parks with flower beds, lawns, woodlands, ponds, gazebos and park benches. In addition, all monastery gardens feature a wide range of Roman Catholic devotional elements such as Lourdes grottoes, Biblical-themed grottoes, Stations of the Cross, Calvary groups, Sacred Heart statues (5!), and various Marian shrines and statues of saints, including several portrait busts of Arnold Janssen. Each garden has its own cemetery. A large section of the gardens of St. Michael's Monastery (the section across the road from the main monastery building, south of Parkstraat) is open to the public. The gardens and cemetery of the Sacred Heart Monastery can be visited only after obtaining permission. The Holy Ghost Monastery gardens are closed to the public.

A major visitor attraction in Steyl is the botanical garden Jochumhof, named after the SVD biology teacher Father Peter Jochum. It was formerly used for teaching future SVD missionaries about tropical plants. The garden is now run by volunteers.

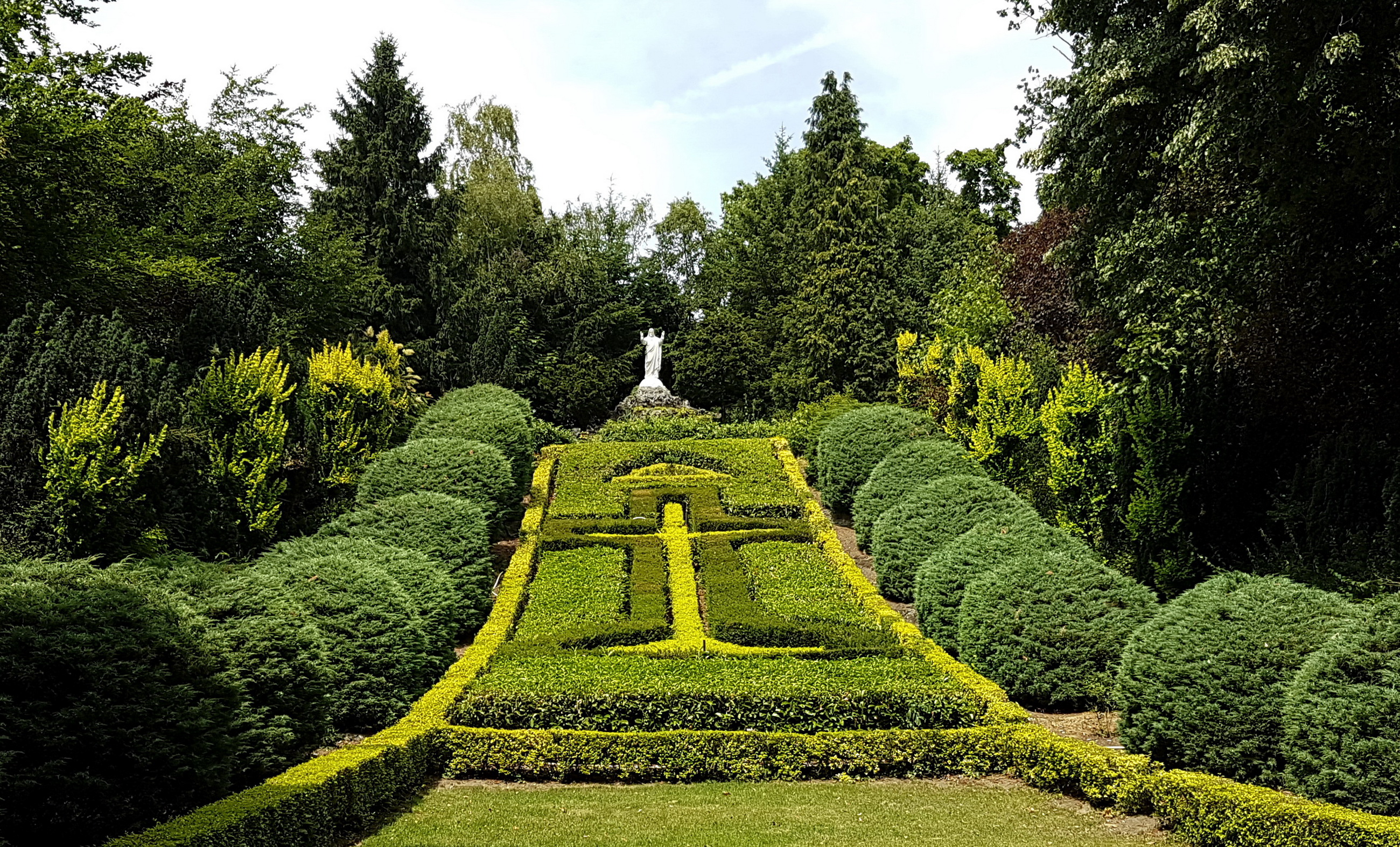
Sacred Heart Hill in St. Michael's monastery gardens

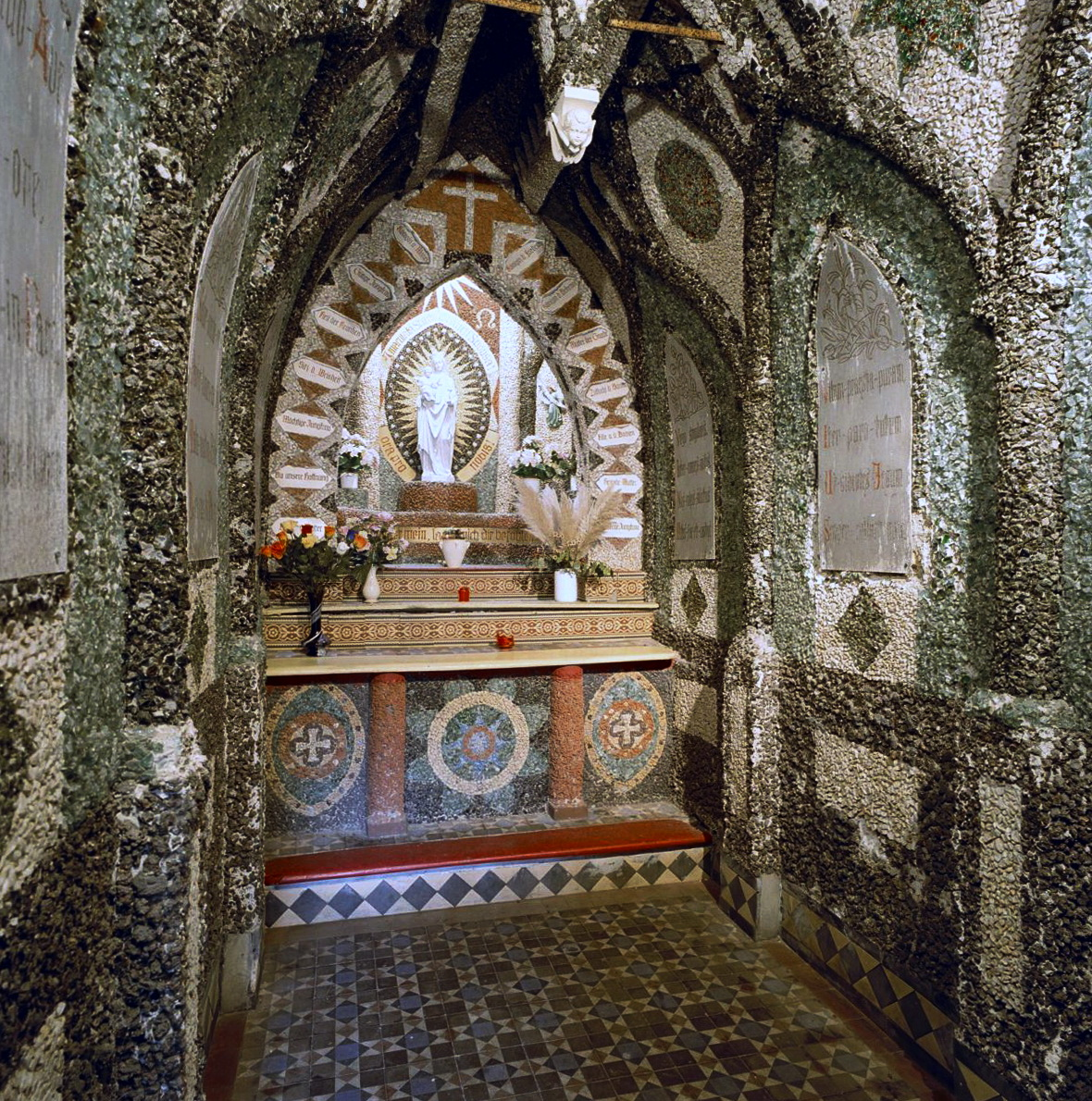
Marian grotto, St. Michael's monastery gardens

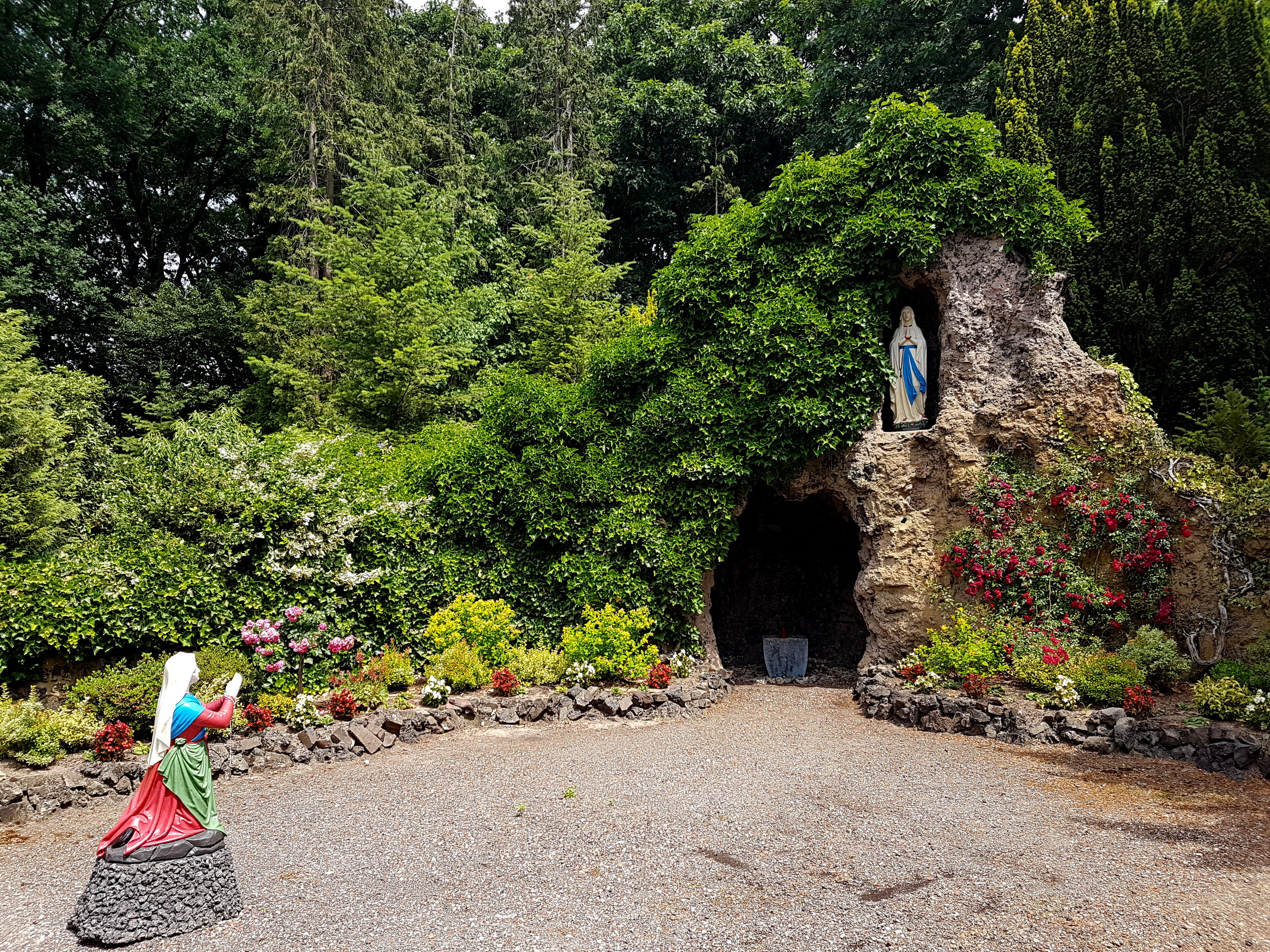
Lourdes Grotto, Sacred Heart monastery gardens

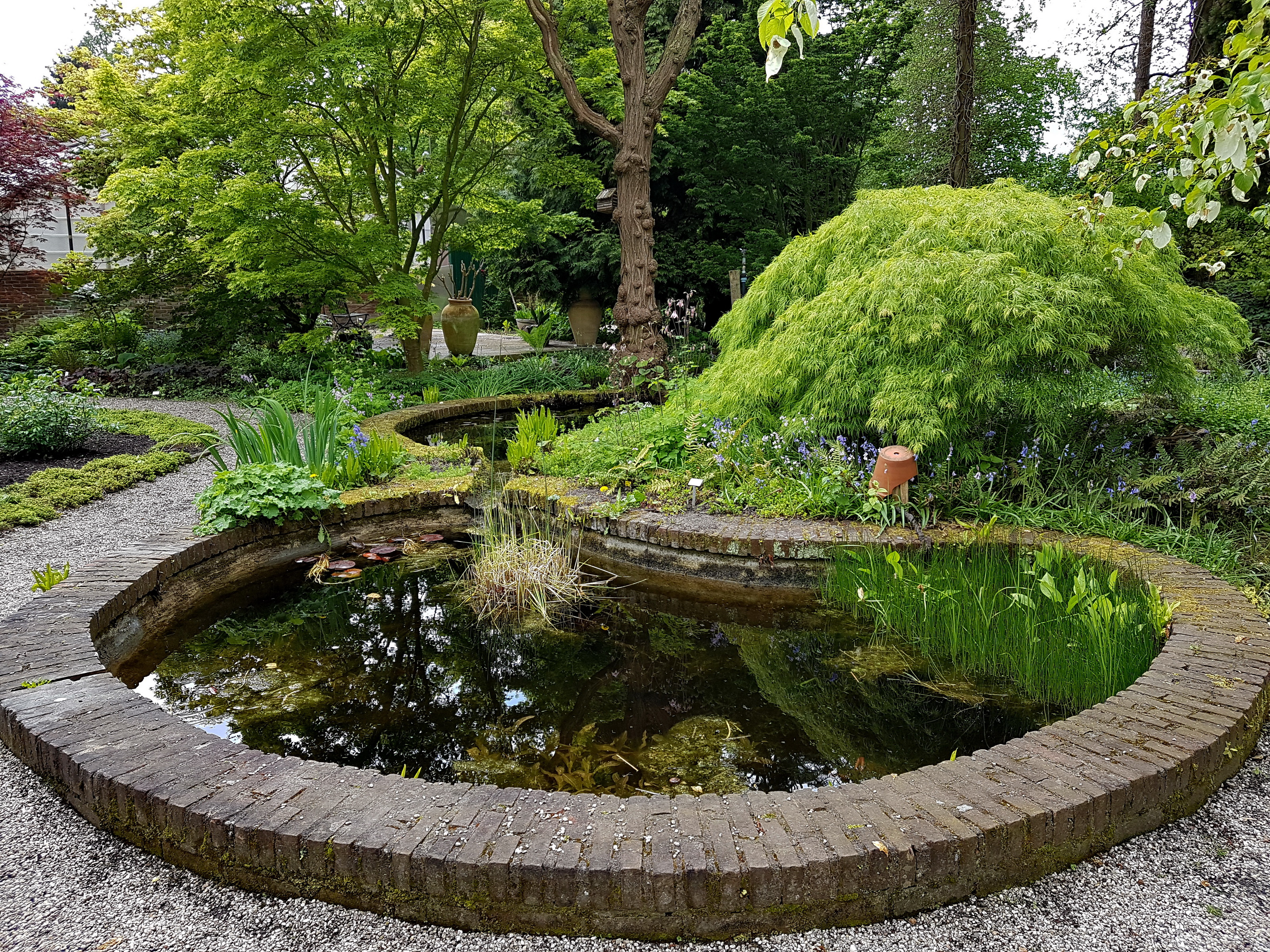
Pond in botanical garden Jochumhof

=== Museums ===
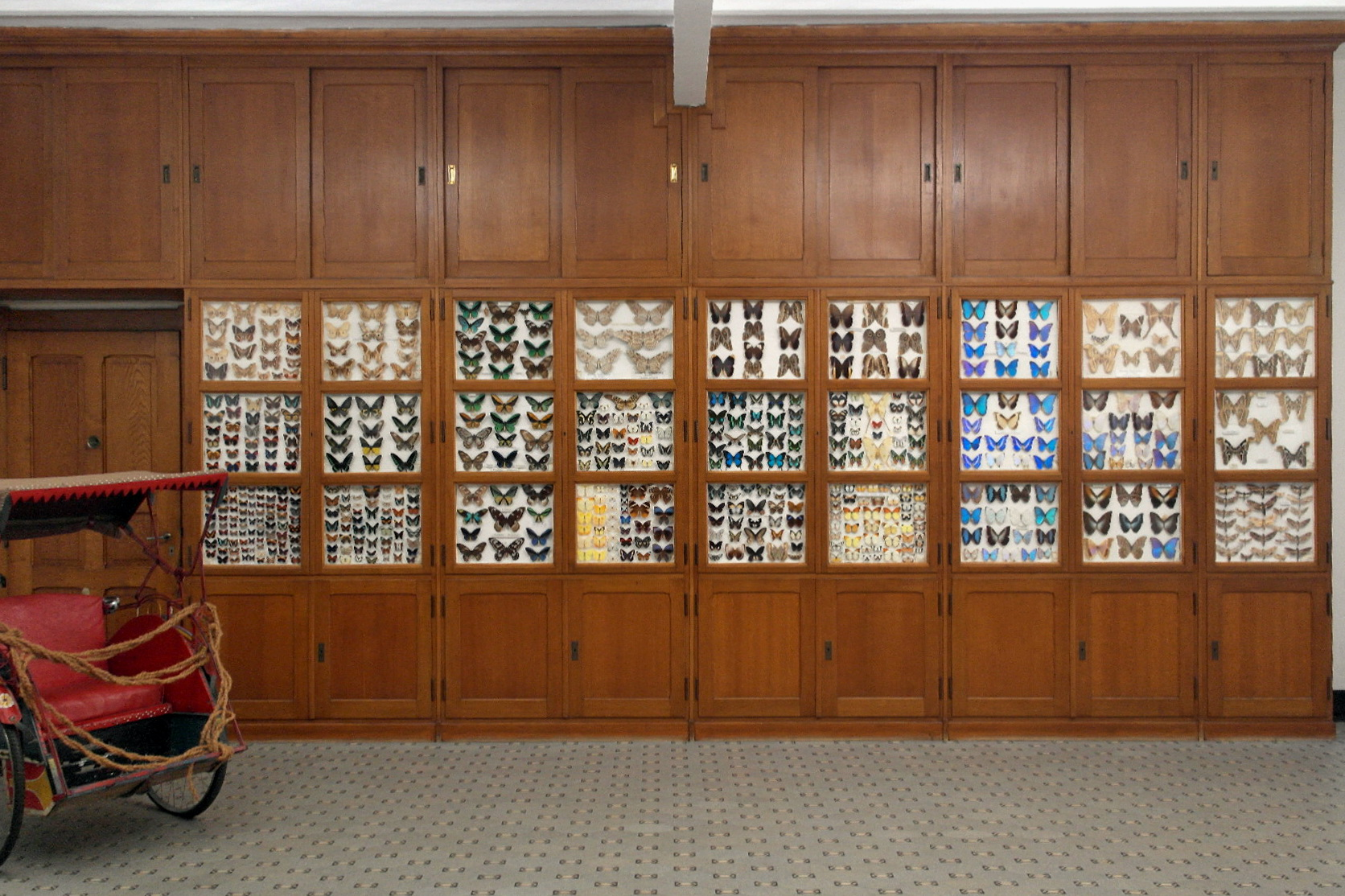
Collection of taxidermied butterflies in Missiemuseum Steyl

The Missiemuseum Steyl is the oldest museum in Venlo. From 1875 on, the SVD fathers travelled around the world and contributed to the collection. The arrangement of the collection within the museum has not been substantially changed since its inception in the early 20th century. The taxidermic collection includes local stuffed mammals, as well as animals from the polar regions and the South American jungles. A separate room is dedicated to painstakingly arranged collections of insects and arthropods. The ethnographic collection consists of artefacts from Indonesia, Papua New Guinea, China, Japan, and many other countries where SVD missionaries worked. Included are the clothes worn by two missionaries when they were killed by spear thrusts during the Boxer Rebellion (1899–1901) in China. Blood stains and holes remain visible on the clothes.

The Limburgs Schutterijmuseum is also located in Steyl. This museum shows a collection of the clothes and accoutrements of Limburg's Schutterij organisations (see: militia). The museum building, the former Sint-Gregorklooster, was struck by fire in 2008. Part of the collection was saved, but damage to the building was significant. The foundation that supports the museum continues to exhibit the collection in a former church elsewhere in the village.

Other museums include the Wereldpaviljoen ("World Pavilion"), aimed at young visitors to make them familiar with cultural diversity, and the so-called Forgiveness Museum, a pop-up museum that is based in the former premises of the Schutterijmuseum.

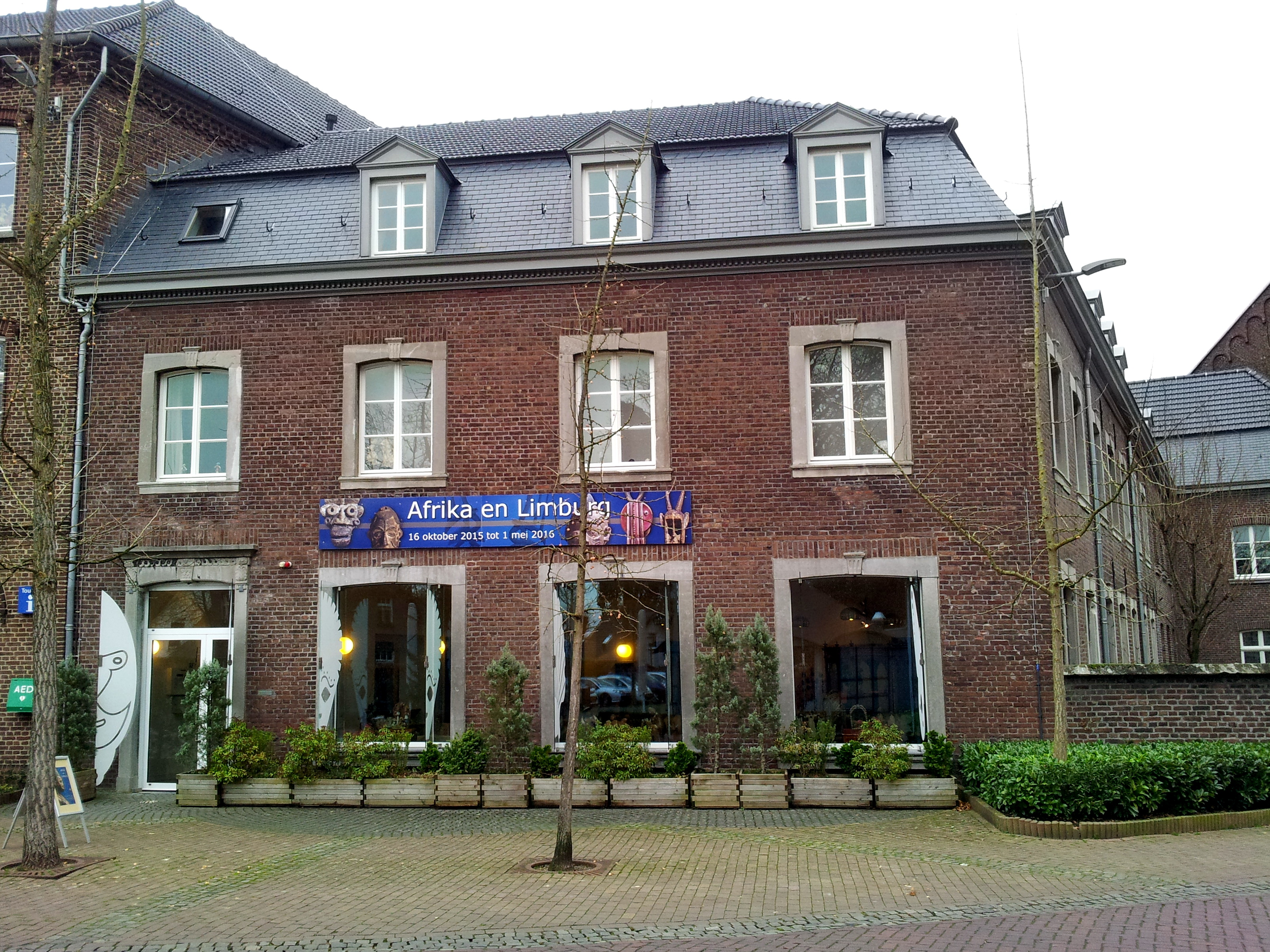
Entrance Missiemuseum

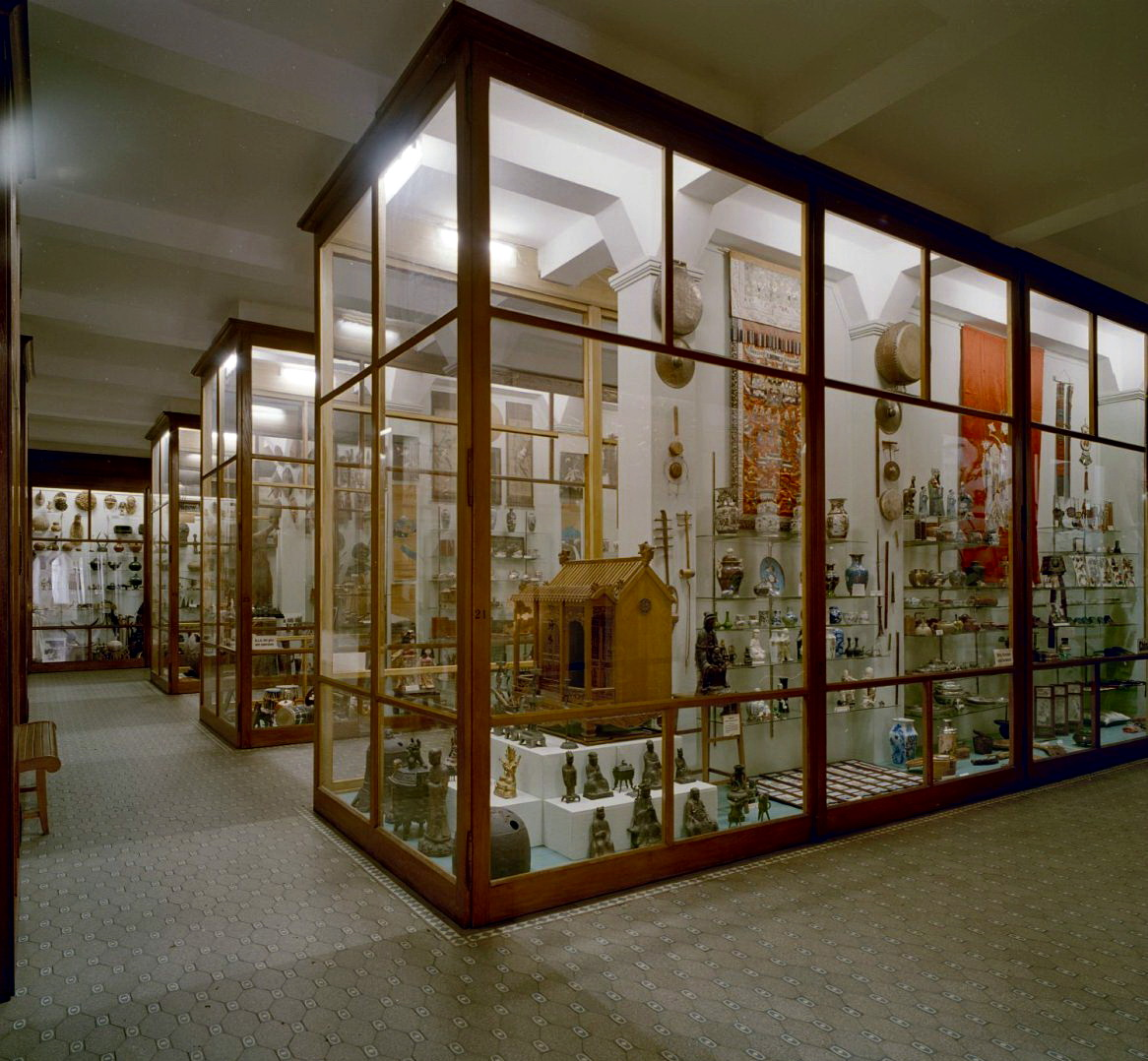
Gallery in the Missiemuseum

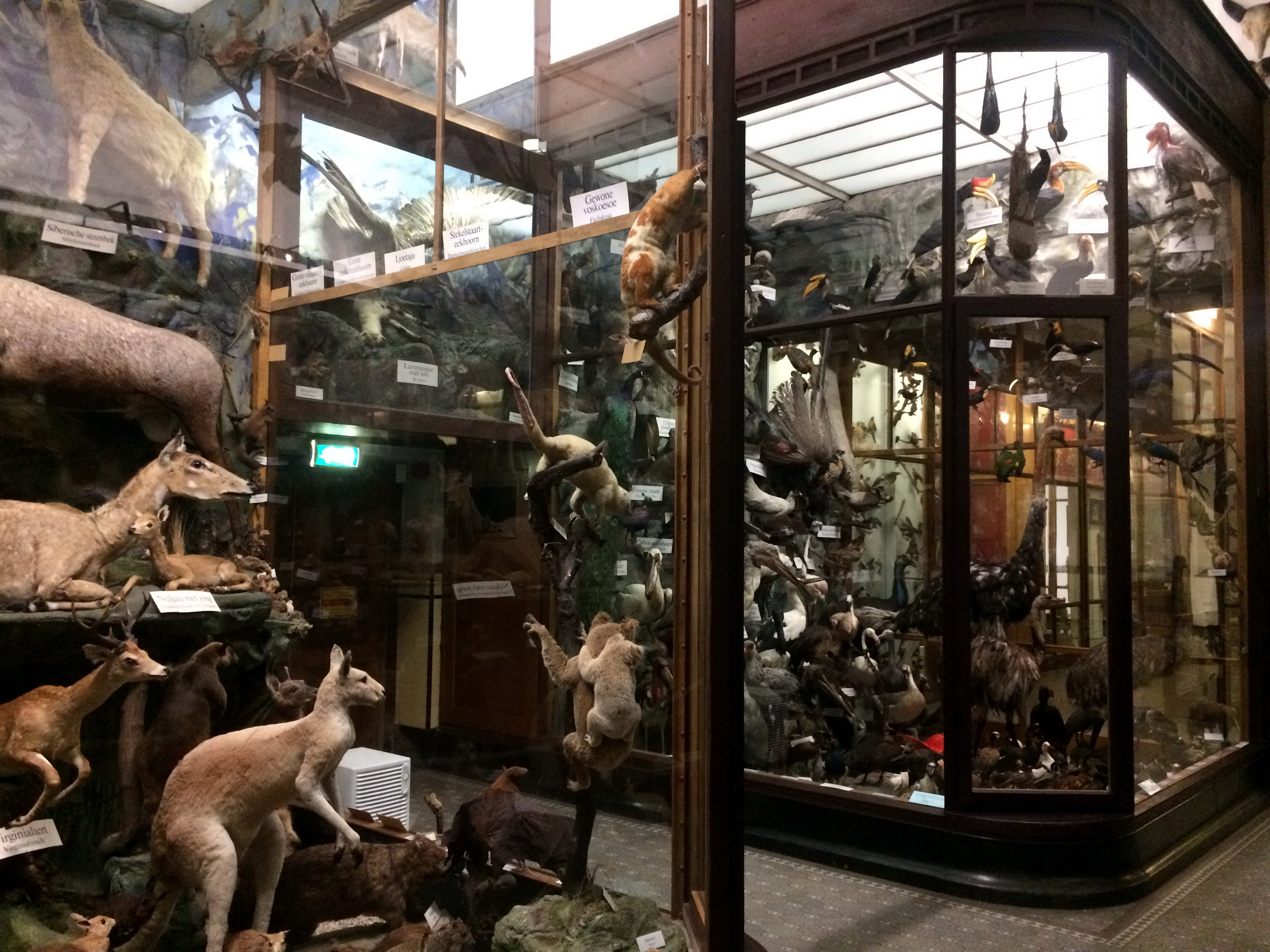
Taxidermied mammals

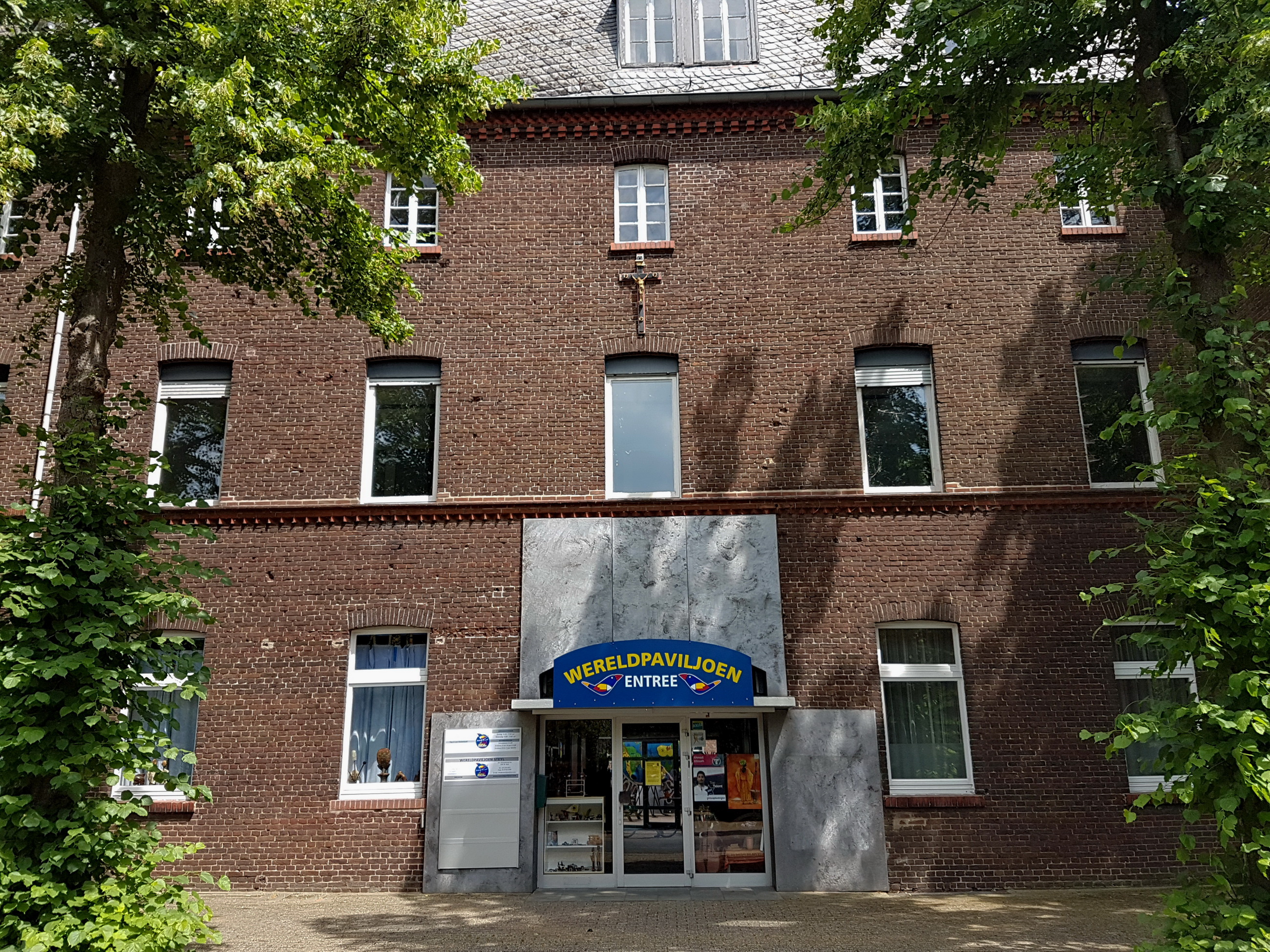
Entrance Wereldpaviljoen

== Sources ==
- Maes, B., & E. van den Dool (2005): Beschermd dorpsgezicht Steyl. Een beschrijving van de cultuurhistorisch waardevolle groenelementen. Ecologisch Adviesbureau Maes, Utrecht (http://www.ecologischadviesbureaumaes.nl/318.pdf online PDF) (in Dutch)
- Welschen, A.J. (2000–05): Course Dutch Society and Culture, International School for Humanities and Social Studies ISHSS, University of Amsterdam
- Toelichting bij het besluit tot aanwijzing van het beschermde dorpsgezicht Steyl. Rijksdienst voor de Monumentenzorg, Zeist, 2004 (online PDF) (in Dutch)
