= Arnold Janssen =

German-Dutch Catholic priest (1837–1909)

Saint Arnold Janssen SVD
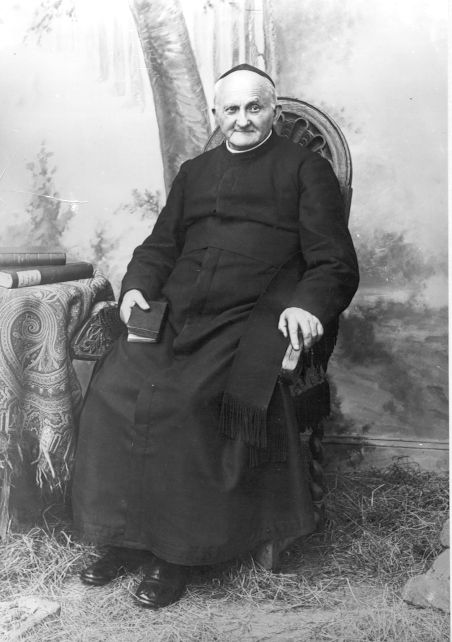
- Born: 5 November 1837; Goch, Kingdom of Prussia
- Died: 15 January 1909 (aged 71); Steyl, Netherlands
- Venerated in: Catholic Church
- Beatified: 19 October 1975, Saint Peter's Basilica, Vatican City by Pope Paul VI
- Canonized: 5 October 2003, Saint Peter's Basilica, Vatican City by Pope John Paul II
- Major shrine: St. Arnold Janssen Shrine Parish Cainta, Rizal, Philippines
- Feast: 15 January

Arnold Janssen SVD (5 November 1837 – 15 January 1909), was a German-Dutch Catholic priest and missionary who is venerated as a saint. He founded the Society of the Divine Word, a Catholic missionary religious congregation, also known as the Divine Word Missionaries, as well as two congregations for women. In 1889 he founded in Steyl, Netherlands, the Missionary Sisters Servants of the Holy Spirit and in 1896 at the same place the Holy Spirit Adoration Sisters. He was canonized on 5 October 2003, by Pope John Paul II.

== Life and work ==
Janssen was born 5 November 1837 in Goch in the Rhineland, Germany, not far from the Dutch border, one of eleven siblings. He developed a deep, simple faith. His first school was the Catholic Augustinianum High School in Gaesdonck, which is near his birthplace. He took up the study of philosophy at the Academy of Muenster, and then entered the University of Bonn. As a student in the university, Janssen entered a mathematics contest; he used the prize money to treat his father to a trip to the university and down the Rhine River; (his mother was too ill to make the trip).

Janssen was ordained to the priesthood for the diocese of Muenster on 15 August 1861. For a while he worked as a high school teacher in Bocholt, Germany, teaching physics and catechism. He devoted some years to pastoral work and the teaching of Christian doctrine, in 1873 becoming chaplain and director at the Ursuline convent of Kempen. In 1867 he became the diocesan director of the Apostleship of Prayer. This led to the founding in 1874 of the German-language journal Kleiner Herz-Jesu Bote (Little Messenger of the Sacred Heart), which looked to enlist the faithful in prayer and support for the mission.

The Kulturkampf, however, hampered his efforts, and Janssen purchased land in Steyl, the Netherlands, to begin his seminary, dedicated in 1875 as the "St. Michael the Archangel Mission House". Within a few years, many seminarians, priests and brothers were preparing there for missionary service, and the first two missionaries, Joseph Freinademetz and John Anzer, were sent to Hong Kong at the request of Bishop Giovanni T. Raimondi. The Society of the Divine Word received canonical approbation in 1901.

From the very beginning, a group of women, including Maria Helena Stollenwerk, served the community. Janssen also founded two congregations of religious nuns: The Holy Spirit Missionary Sisters (members known as "Sister Servants of the Holy Spirit") on 8 December 1889, and the Holy Spirit Adoration Sisters ("Sister Servants of the Holy Spirit of Perpetual Adoration") on 8 September 1896.

Arnold Janssen died at Steyl, Holland, on January 15, 1909.

== Veneration ==
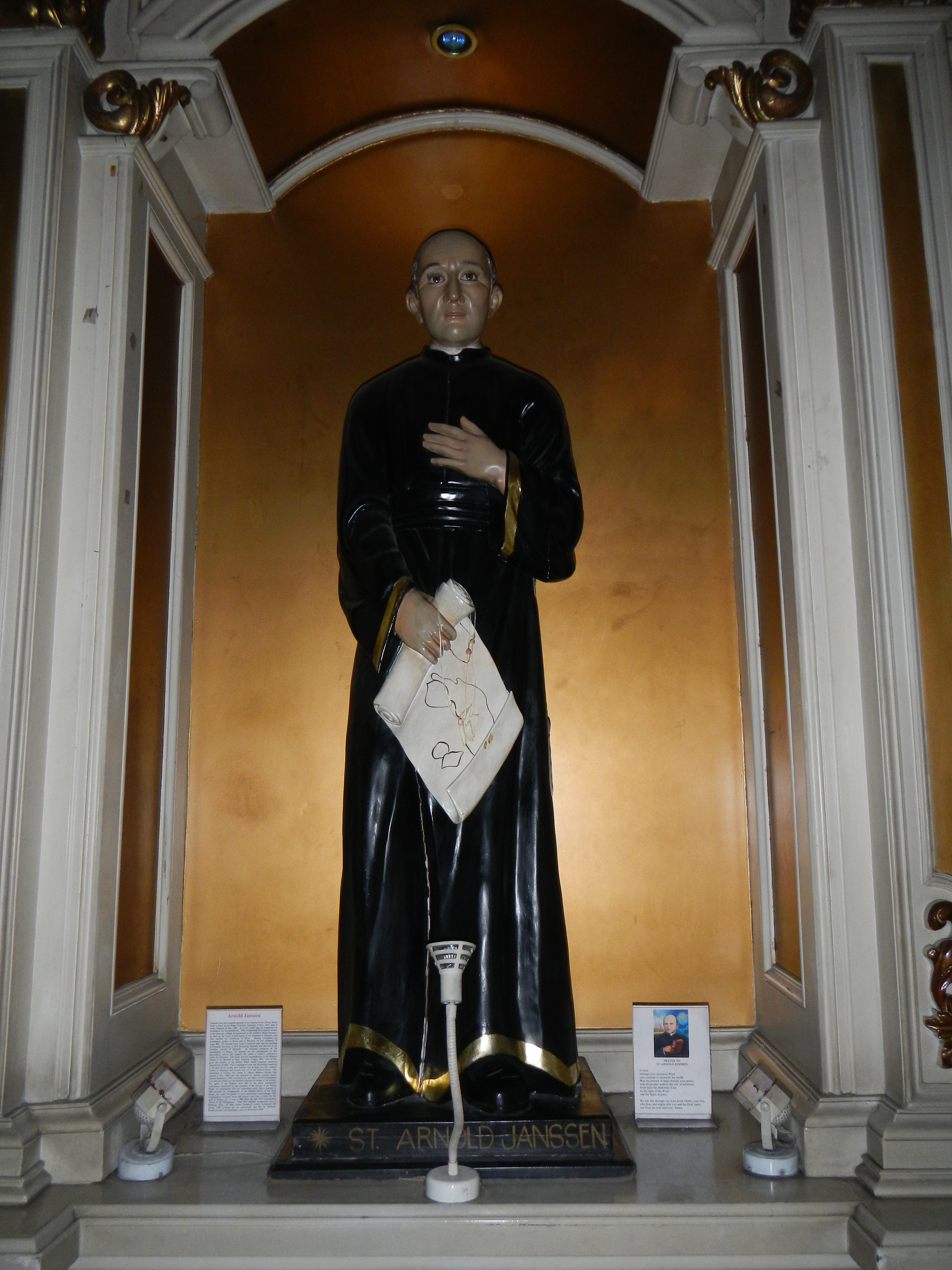
A statue of Arnold Janssen at Sacred Heart Parish Kamuning, Quezon City, Philippines.

Janssen's spiritual writings were approved by theologians on 23 November 1939 and 13 February 1942. His cause was formally opened on 10 July 1942, and he was declared a Servant of God.

Janssen and Joseph Freinademetz, along with Daniele Comboni (an important missionary in Africa) were canonised on 5 October 2003 by Pope John Paul II. Janssen was elevated to sainthood after the healing of Pamela Avellanosa, a Filipina teenager living in Baguio who fell from a bike and was not expected to recover from the resulting head injury. According to her relatives and the Catholic Church, she was healed miraculously following prayers to Janssen.

In his hometown of Goch, the Arnold-Janssen-Church and the Arnold-Janssen-Community are named after Janssen. His birthplace can be visited in the Arnold-Janssen-Street.

The St. Arnold neighborhood in Neuenkirchen, Westphalia, has an Arnold-Janssen High School. It was founded 1929 by his religious community, but since 1996 it has been administered by the Diocese of Münster. The Arnold-Janssen High School in Sankt Wendel, Saarland, is also named for him, as is the Arnold-Janssen-Hauptschule in Bocholt.

== See also ==
- Holy Spirit Adoration Sisters
- Missionary Sisters Servants of the Holy Spirit
