= Lists of Philippine television episodes =

This is a list of lists of Philippine television episodes.

== 0–9 ==
- List of 1DOL episodes
- List of 2 Good 2 Be True episodes
- List of 5 Star Specials episodes
- List of 24/7 episodes
- List of 100 Days to Heaven episodes

== A ==
- List of A1 Ko Sa 'Yo episodes
- List of Abot-Kamay na Pangarap episodes
- List of Agua Bendita episodes and chapters
- List of Alyas Robin Hood episodes
- List of And I Love You So episodes
- List of Ang Dalawang Mrs. Real episodes
- List of Ang Lihim ni Annasandra episodes
- List of Ang Probinsyano seasons
- List of Ang sa Iyo ay Akin episodes
- List of Asawa Ko, Karibal Ko episodes
- List of Asintado episodes

== B ==
- List of Bagong Umaga episodes
- List of Batang Quiapo episodes
- List of Beautiful Justice episodes
- List of Beautiful Strangers episodes
- List of Because of You episodes
- List of The Better Woman episodes
- List of Bihag episodes
- List of Bilangin ang Bituin sa Langit episodes
- List of Asawa ng Asawa Ko episodes
- List of Black Rider episodes
- List of The Blood Sisters episodes
- List of Born for You episodes
- List of Budoy episodes
- List of Buena Familia episodes
- List of Bukas na Lang Kita Mamahalin episodes

== C ==
- List of Cain at Abel episodes
- List of Can't Buy Me Love (2023) episodes
- List of Case Unclosed episodes
- List of Coffee Prince episodes
- List of Contessa episodes
- List of The Cure episodes

== D ==
- List of Dading episodes
- List of Dahil sa Pag-ibig episodes
- List of Daisy Siete episodes
- List of Mars Ravelo's Darna (2022 TV series) episodes
- List of Dear Uge episodes
- List of Descendants of the Sun episodes
- List of Destiny Rose episodes
- List of Dirty Linen episodes
- List of Doble Kara episodes
- List of Dolce Amore episodes
- List of Drag Race Philippines episodes
- List of Dragon Lady episodes
- List of Dyesebel (2014 TV series) episodes

== E ==
- List of E-Boy episodes
- List of Encantadia (2016 TV series) episodes

== F ==
- List of First Yaya episodes
- List of Forevermore episodes

== G ==
- List of The General's Daughter episodes
- List of The Gift episodes
- List of The Good Son episodes
- List of The Greatest Love episodes
- List of Guns and Roses (TV series) episodes

== H ==
- List of Hahamakin ang Lahat episodes
- List of Halik episodes
- List of Hanggang Makita Kang Muli episodes
- List of Hanggang sa Dulo ng Buhay Ko episodes
- List of Hanggang Saan episodes
- List of Haplos episodes
- List of The Haunted episodes
- List of Healing Hearts episodes
- List of Hindi Ko Kayang Iwan Ka episodes
- List of Hiram na Anak episodes
- List of History with Lourd episodes
- List of Hiwaga ng Kambat episodes
- List of Huwag Kang Mangamba episodes

== I ==
- List of I Can See Your Voice (Philippine game show) episodes
- List of Ika-5 Utos episodes
- List of Ika-6 na Utos episodes
- List of Ikaw ay Pag-Ibig episodes
- List of Imortal episodes
- List of Impostora episodes
- List of Impostora (2017) episodes
- List of Inagaw na Bituin episodes
- List of Inday Will Always Love You episodes
- List of Indio episodes
- List of Init sa Magdamag episodes
- List of Innamorata episodes
- List of Ipaglaban Mo! episodes
- List of The Iron Heart episodes

== J ==
- List of Juan dela Cruz episodes
- List of Junior MasterChef Pinoy Edition episodes

== K ==
- List of Kadenang Ginto episodes
- List of Kahit Puso'y Masugatan episodes
- List of Kambal, Karibal episodes
- List of Kapag Nahati ang Puso episodes
- List of Kara Mia episodes
- List of Karelasyon episodes
- List of The Killer Bride episodes
- List of Kokey (TV series) episodes
- List of Komiks episodes

== L ==
- List of Langit Lupa episodes
- List of Legal Wives episodes
- List of Legally Blind episodes
- List of Let the Love Begin episodes
- List of Linlang episodes
- List of Lip Sync Battle Philippines episodes
- List of Little Nanay episodes
- List of Lobo episodes
- List of Lorenzo's Time episodes
- List of Los Bastardos episodes
- List of Love & Lies episodes
- List of Love in 40 Days episodes
- List of Love of My Life episodes
- List of Love Thy Woman episodes
- List of A Love to Last episodes
- List of Love You Two episodes
- List of La Luna Sangre episodes
- List of The Wall Philippines episodes

== M ==
- List of Maalaala Mo Kaya episodes
- List of Madrasta episodes
- List of Maging Sino Ka Man (2006 TV series) episodes
- List of Maging Sino Ka Man: Ang Pagbabalik episodes
- List of Magkaibang Mundo episodes
- List of Magkaribal episodes
- List of Magpahanggang Wakas episodes
- List of Magpakailanman episodes (2002–2007)
- List of Magpakailanman episodes (2012–2019)
- List of Magpakailanman episodes (2020–present)
- List of Make It with You episodes
- List of Mara Clara (2010 TV series) episodes
- List of May Bukas Pa episodes and chapters
- List of Maynila episodes
- List of Meant to Be episodes
- List of Mga Kuwento ni Lola Basyang episodes
- List of Midnight DJ episodes
- List of Minsan Lang Kita Iibigin episodes
- List of Minute to Win It (Philippine game show) episodes and contestants
- List of Mirabella episodes
- List of Momay episodes
- List of Mulawin vs. Ravena episodes
- List of Muling Buksan ang Puso episodes
- List of Mundo Mo'y Akin episodes
- List of My BFF episodes
- List of My Dear Heart episodes
- List of My Destiny episodes
- List of My Faithful Husband episodes
- List of My Korean Jagiya episodes
- List of My Special Tatay episodes
- List of My Super D episodes

== N ==
- List of Nag-aapoy na Damdamin episodes
- List of Nang Ngumiti ang Langit episodes
- List of Nasaan Ka Elisa episodes
- List of Ngayon at Kailanman episodes
- List of Niño episodes
- List of Noah (TV series) episodes

== O ==
- List of On the Wings of Love episodes
- List of Onanay episodes
- List of Once Upon a Kiss episodes
- List of One of the Baes episodes
- List of The One That Got Away episodes
- List of One True Love episodes
- List of Owe My Love episodes

== P ==
- List of Pamilya Roces episodes
- List of Pangako Sa 'Yo (2015 TV series) episodes
- List of Parasite Island episodes
- List of Pari 'Koy episodes
- List of Pira-Pirasong Paraiso episodes
- List of Poor Señorita episodes
- List of Precious Hearts Romances Presents episodes
- List of Prima Donnas episodes
- List of The Promise of Forever episodes

== R ==
- List of Reputasyon episodes
- List of Running Man Philippines episodes (2022)
- List of Running Man Philippines episodes (2024)

== S ==
- List of Sa Piling ni Nanay episodes
- List of Sahaya episodes
- List of Sana Bukas Pa ang Kahapon episodes
- List of Sana Dalawa ang Puso episodes
- List of Sandugo episodes
- List of Second Chances episodes
- List of Senior High episodes
- List of Sherlock Jr. episodes
- List of Sine Novela episodes
- List of Sino ang Maysala?: Mea Culpa episodes
- List of Sinungaling Mong Puso episodes
- List of Someone to Watch Over Me episodes
- List of Stairway to Heaven (Philippine TV series) episodes
- List of Starla episodes
- List of The Stepdaughters episodes
- List of The Story of Us episodes
- List of Strawberry Lane episodes
- List of Super Ma'am episodes

== T ==
- List of Tadhana episodes
- List of Temptation of Wife episodes
- List of The Half Sisters episodes
- List of The Lost Recipe episodes
- List of The Millionaire's Wife episodes
- List of The Rich Man's Daughter episodes
- List of Till I Met You episodes
- List of Tubig at Langis episodes

== V ==
- List of La Vida Lena episodes

== W ==
- List of Walang Hanggang Paalam episodes
- List of Wansapanataym episodes
- List of We Will Survive episodes
- List of Wildflower episodes
- List of Wish I May episodes

== Y ==
- List of Yagit episodes
- List of Your Song episodes
