= 5 Star Specials =

- Genre: Anthology, Drama
- Created by: Associated Broadcasting Company
- Starring: Various
- Country of origin: Philippines
- No. of seasons: 3
- No. of episodes: 23 (list of episodes)

Production
- Running time: 1 hour

Original release
- Network: TV5
- Release: March 22 – September 1, 2010

5 Star Specials is a Philippine television drama anthology series broadcast by TV5. It aired from March 22, 2010 to September 1, 2010, replacing Kuwentong Talentado and was replaced by Lady Dada. The drama anthology features prime talents in their various portrayals.

== See also ==
- List of TV5 (Philippine TV network) original programming
