= List of Lobo episodes =

This is a list of episodes for the Philippine TV Series Lobo. The episodes were directed by Cathy Garcia-Molina, Jerry Lopez Sineneng and FM Reyes and produced by ABS-CBN.

== Episode list ==
No.	Title
1	"Nessa transforms into a Wolf"
The day after Emil's marriage proposal, Nessa wakes up from the same dream that has been haunting her as her 21st birthday nears. She is shocked to find herself covered with mud and asks her mother for an explanation. But what takes her aback more was the sight of the dead poultry in their backyard. Her mom could only burst into tears upon looking at her. Savannah reveals the true nature of Nessa's father Lorenzo Blancaflor, who has inherited the werewolf curse of his family. Thinking that his twin sister Eleanor was the only one who got the wolf curse when they turned 21, Lorenzo was unprepared when he suddenly turned into a beast years after and accidentally killed a human being. His parents, head of the wolf clan "Waya", who are sworn to protect humans from blood drinkers, sentenced their own son to death. Eleanor tried to save her twin but it was too late. Lorenzo then confesses that he has a family. By then, Savannah with Clara and Nessa were on their way to San Adolfo to start a new life. Nessa panics with the truth of her nature and hastily meets with Emil to break off their engagement. She rushes back home to tell her mother the sad news but as the symptoms of her 'transformation' become stronger, Nessa accidentally kills Savannah. Her half-sister Clara blames her for their mother's sudden demise. Nessa flees with Emil hot on her heels. However, as he tries to persuade Nessa to marry him, she changes into a white wolf. Surprised, Emil runs away from her.
2	"Nessa reunites with Emil"
Nessa runs away to San Sebastian. There she is raped by Nicolas Raymundo and bears a child, Lyka. Unlike Emil, Nicolas is not revolted by her transformation. His love for her enables them to start a family. Years after however, Nessa is on the run again after her secret is discovered by their neighbors. Unfortunately, Nicolas is killed before he can escape. Together with her daughter, Nessa returns to San Adolfo and her sister Clara, who was widowed and raising her step son, Anton. And as if destiny brought them together, she meets Emil again in the chapel. Meanwhile, Ulay/Lyka wanders to a place where she meets Jay-Jay. The two instantly become fast friends. Later, Nessa is reunited with Clara, who's still not willing to reconcile their differences. Nevertheless, Clara lets her stay with her child. Then Ulay/Lyka meets Clara's stepson Anton for the first time. Nessa finds Lorenzo's diary and takes it to her favorite spot. Emil's strong bond with her also leads him there. Then he tells Nessa how he had regretted turning his back on her even for a moment. Nessa admits that she loves him too but the curse stops her from putting the lives of her loved ones in danger. While both their parents are out, Jay-Jay and Ulay play by the moonlight. Anton sees them but he refuses to join their game. By this time, Nessa reveals to Emil that she merely intends to leave Ulay in Clara's care before she runs away again. However, Emil insists that she doesn't have to go for he can try formulating a cure for her.
3	"Emil tests his antidote on Nessa"
Leon wants Emil to join “Luna”, a special force of the army that aims to destroy the race of werewolves. But Emil refuses to use his brilliance as a biochemist in such endeavors for he believes that all kinds of creatures have the right to live in this world. But Leon reveals that other than recruiting him, his team is also hunting for a werewolf which is rumored to be on the loose in San Adolfo. Emil denies this as mere hearsay. That night however, Emil witnesses Nessa's transformation once again as they both meet in the forest to test the antidote he made for her, not knowing that someone is hiding on top of a tree! Worse, Ulay wakes up with her mother gone and goes out in search of her. Jay-Jay tags along while Anton trails after them. By the time the trio hear the wolf's cry, the injected cure is already taking a violent effect on Nessa while Emil struggles in its wake.
4	"Jay-Jay and Ulay fail to run away"
The incident in the forest has left a tragedy that changed the lives of Ulay and Jay-Jay. Unbeknownst to them, Nessa is still alive but a separate troop of "Luna" led by Vivian Lee has captured her for a secret experiment. On the other hand, Leon becomes Jay-Jay's legal guardian through his fake documents. He also uses this ruse to search through Emil's laboratory. Unfortunately for him, Fr. Ben has already taken the box containing Emil's confidential tests. Later, Leon tells Jay-Jay that he's bringing him to Manila. Jay-Jay then plans his escape together with Ulay. However, they are both swept by the river's strong current when they tried to flee San Adolfo. Jay-Jay wakes up in a hospital where Leon breaks the news of Ulay's death. When in truth, several men have rescued Ulay. But even Clara lies about Jay-Jay's fate. The two now only have their parents’ moonstones to remind them of each other.
5	"Jay-Jay and Ulay move on to a new life"
Both Noah (Jay-Jay) and Lyka (Ulay) never outgrew their way of wishing on the moonstones that their parents gave them. At 16, Lyka is still struggling with her Aunt Clara's cruelty while Noah is a newly-grad soldier. But until now, they continue to hold on to their special bond as kids though they believe that one of them is already dead. As more years flew by, Anton's love for Lyka paves the way for a “peaceful” relationship between her and his stepmom. She also fulfills her dream to graduate from a fashion school through Anton's financial assistance. Then Lyka lands herself a job in the ‘House of Elle’, not knowing that Lady Elle has sensed that she may be the long-lost werewolf her family is looking for. On the other hand, Noah has toughened up over the years for him to survive the military life. Then he becomes assigned to head an important operation that reunites him with Bok, his fellow mistah who's now working as an intelligence officer. At first glance, Noah seems to have led a normal life but in truth, the nightmare of the accident of his father still haunts him at night. The same thing also happens to Lyka but her dreams to date shows her mom captured in a hospital cell.
6	"Lyka meets Noah"
Operation Luna fakes a rescue mission to penetrate the House of Elle, which is said to be a front of Manolo's illegal business. But a glitch in the plan occurs when Lyka lands in the secured area as Noah is about to save Manolo from his captors. Gen. Leon later rebukes Noah about it but the latter assures him that the witness of the phony hostage has been cleared and debriefed. Lyka returns to the commercial shoot safe and sound. But all Elton rants about is that she's incapable of being his fashion assistant. In spite of that, nothing can destroy Lyka's bliss for she believes that she has actually found her destiny. She is all praise for her dashing hero while Noah is in fact complaining to Gabrielle about Lyka's ill-fated appearance in his life. Meanwhile, Lady Elle loses her temper when she learns that Manolo was kidnapped, fearing that the whole thing is just a ruse to catch them. As it is, a party for the Council of Waya nears and it seems that Lady Elle's instinctive discovery of Lyka as their missing member has a major part for the event. On the other hand, Nessa is still in the hands of Vivian's medical team and they are now looking for Lyka.
7	"Noah becomes Lyka's knight in shining armor again"
Manolo believes Noah's story about being discharged from the military. As such, he hires him to become Lady Elle's bodyguard. Noah however is unaware that his mission truly involves "Operation Luna" and not a terrorist group. As it is, his friend Gaby connives with Gen. Leon with regards to their infiltration of the House of Elle. Lyka gets fired from her job so she cheers herself up by playing billiards with Trixie. Several guys suddenly start harassing her and luckily she spots Noah passing by. Then to her amazement, he rescues her again from further trouble and even offers her a ride home. The next day, Clara gets angry when she discovers Lyka's latest dilemma. As such, Lyka immediately looks for a new job, oblivious to the eyes that follow her every move. Will Lady Elle confront Lyka soon regarding their blood ties?
8	"Both Lyka and Noah start working for Lady Elle"
Lady Elle hires Lyka again to be her personal assistant. This time, she teaches her to be strong enough to voice out what she knows is right. Elton is enraged when he sees Lyka in the office but his protests are useless in the wake of Lady Elle's authority. An instance when Lyka contradicts his fashion design in front of Lady Elle merely increases his resentment towards her. Meanwhile, Lady Elle gives in to Manolo's wish for her to have a bodyguard. However, she sets some rules for Noah to follow. Lyka homes in on him as soon as she discovers that they are working closely together for Lady Elle. And as it is, Noah becomes her certified knight in shining armor in every way. On a serious note though, Noah learns from Gaby that the ‘House of Elle’ plans to set up its own top-secret laboratory for its fabrics as a good cover to its illegal operations—and in fact, Gaby knows that the clan of ‘Waya’ is the one which will really benefit from it.
9	"Lady Elle gathers the Council of Waya"
Everyone is busy preparing for a fashion party in the House of Elle. Noah keeps a copy of the complete guest list for surveillance. Then he follows Lyka to the rooftop where he gets stuck with her alone. Lyka badgers him with slum book questions which he later ponders on. On the other hand, Lyka drops her moonstone while listening to Lady Elle's instructions for the event. The party is actually a ruse to legitimize a renowned scientist coming to work for the House of Elle. At the same time, Lady Elle secretly meets with the Council of Waya to tell them about her conviction that Lyka's the “last protector” they have been waiting for to save their clan when the next lunar eclipse occurs. As it is, some of the members are already tired of running away from their normal lives because of the curse. Unbeknownst to them, Lyka is slowly transforming into a wolf by then! After picking up her moonstone from Lady's Elle's office, she suddenly feels a searing pain in her head and body. The pain proves to be too much for her as she finally collapses on the floor. How will Lyka deal with the discovery of her true nature? Will someone witness her transformation?
10	"Lady Elle probes into Lyka’s painful attack"
Lyka's painful attack didn’t turn into a full-blown transformation yet. As such, she makes it to the party at Lady Elle's house. She falls into a pond however due to Elton's nasty prank. Lyka intends to fix herself up when she happens to see the striking portraits of Lady Elle's family. Lady Elle finds her there and inquires about what made her late. Lyka's a bit surprised with her boss's odd concern yet proceeds to describe the pain she felt earlier. This further confirms Lady Elle's instinct that she is indeed the destined protector of her clan. But the rest of the Council of Waya feels otherwise after Lyka leaves a weak impression on them.
11	"Selena is ready to do tests on Lyka"
After sharing a kiss, Noah suddenly avoids Lyka in the office. As it is, he's torn between his mission and unexpected attraction towards her. In the end, he decides to invite Lyka on a dinner date to set her straight about his real intentions. Meanwhile, Lady Elle is really worried since the council is losing fate in her plans. Selena however assures her that she will hasten her tests on Lyka so they can finally confirm whether she is the one they are looking for. Unknown to them, Operation Luna is doing more progress in unearthing the secrets behind the House of Elle. Gen. Leon learns about Selena's background as a veterinarian, hence, he is determined to find the location of her lab.
12	"Noah rejects Lyka"
On their dinner date, Noah tells Lyka that their kiss doesn’t mean anything for he was just temporarily affected by her antics before. He insists that it's better to remain professional as co-workers. Lyka agrees with him then quickly leaves the restaurant. Truth be told, Lyka is deeply hurt by his words since she was seriously attracted with him from the very start. On the other hand, Noah seems to regret what he said and becomes confused with his feelings too. As such, Lyka is baffled by his sweet gestures the following day as if he was making up for hurting her. Anton learns about Lyka's dilemma. As such, he waits up for Noah at the office, trails after him and bumps his ride! How will Clara react to her son's overprotection towards Lyka?
13	"Noah consoles Lyka"
Noah bruises his arms in the accident. When he gets home however, Gen. Leon adds to his pain by punishing him for letting his emotions rule over his mission. But in front of his comrades in Operation Luna, Gen. Leon warns them that endangering Noah's life is out of the plan—not knowing that it was an outsider who was responsible for his son's mishap. Anton, on the other hand is still enraged by Noah's involvement with Lyka, much to Clara's lasting resentment for her niece. It turns out that Lady Elle still doesn’t realize that Lyka is not only the destined savior of their clan but Lorenzo's long-lost granddaughter as well. More trouble is brewing though as more of her allies are being tracked by Luna. Together with Manolo's help, Lady Elle starts to evacuate the Wayas to a community built just for them. Meanwhile, Lyka is merely assisting Elton for his presentation when the latter suddenly tricks her into doing the whole report. Unknown to her, Elton has deleted the file before the meeting. As such, Lady Elle gets angry when she is unable to provide a concept for their summer collection. Lyka runs to the rooftop in tears while Noah, who saw the whole thing, rushes to comfort her.
14	"Noah looks after Lyka’s welfare"
Instead of feeling grateful after Noah gives her a shoulder to cry on, Lyka walks out on him for she's determined to keep their relationship professional. As it is, Noah contradicts himself by showing care to Lyka especially when she meets an accident at the office. He makes sure that she arrives home safe and even brings her car from the office to her home for her to use the next day. On the other hand, Lyka is giddy with delight as Anton buys a new house for them. As such, she refuses to burden him more with her own problems. Lady Elle fears for the professor's life as he vanished without a trace. Manolo in turn talks to Datos to further investigate on Luna's schemes. But the latter admits that it is difficult to penetrate the very secretive organization. Meanwhile, Gaby manipulates Noah to do surveillance on the warehouse of the House of Elle. What can his team possibly find there?
15	"Lyka wants Noah to back off"
Lady Elle approves Lyka's summer collection concept despite Elton's objections. As such, Elton gets even by pretending to celebrate Lyka's success only to set her up into a date rape. But before things get out of hand, Noah goes to her rescue as soon as he hears from Trixie that Lyka's in a drunken stupor once more. However, Lyka's not impressed anymore with her knight in shining armor. She is even enraged when Noah avoids discussing the real score between them. Lyka claims that she should have slapped him before for kissing her but also admits that it was also her fault to expect too much from him. That said, she then tells him to stay out of her life.
16	"Trixie reports to the Council of Waya"
Vivian demands a fresh mind in her team to further her tests on Nessa. Anton happens to fit the job but he asks for more time before accepting their generous offer. Incidentally, he's equally frustrated with his failed efforts to formulate the right antidote to prevent his own transformation. Meanwhile, Noah heads the raid on a warehouse where Choy is ultimately killed. Noah blames the futile mission to Gaby but the latter merely returns the guilt feelings on him. As it is, Gen. Leon tells the man in the shadow that he is actually grooming his son for the next crucial phase of Luna's mission. Lyka's hearing sharpens and even hears Noah talking with himself about her. She reveals this oddity to Trixie who merely dismisses it as a figment of her imagination. But in truth, Trixie happens to be a member of the Waya clan and is assigned as Lyka's caretaker! Trixie even reports to the council to strengthen Lady Elle's conviction that Lyka is their destined savior.
17	"Noah and Lyka share a magical embrace"
Trixie's revelation about Lyka's special attachment with Noah causes further disruption among the council. Lady Elle however has to end the meeting as she learns about the raid in her warehouse. She lays the blame on Luna but Manolo believes Leon's explanation that the incident was simply a military operation gone wrong. On the other hand, Gaby rants at the man in the shadow that no one was supposed to be killed in their mission. The latter however insists that it was part of the plan and reminds her that there's no room for guilt since they are working for the greater good after all. Meanwhile, Leon assures the two that he would handle Noah himself. Noah is deeply hurt by Choy's death. And even in the distance, Lyka hears his cry of pain. Lyka then rushes to comfort him but Noah rejects her offer of consolation. But eventually, he accepts her shoulder to cry on. Then he walks away after sharing a momentous hug reminiscent of Jay-Jay and Ulay's “magic embrace”. As soon as he arrives home though, Noah gets in a row with Leon, pushing him to storm out again. And surprisingly, he seeks Lyka with whom he unburdens his feelings of guilt.
18	"Lyka gets promoted"
Lady Elle deliberately entangles Noah with Lyka so she can at least enjoy life before she discovers her true nature. At the same time, Lyka is assigned to work directly with Selena to begin the top-secret tests on her. As such, Gaby becomes suspicious with Lyka's promotion and shares her doubts with Noah. But Noah refuses to believe that someone as innocent as Lyka can be involved in "drug dealings". However, Noah can’t fully dismiss Gaby's theories as he follows Lyka's every move. Lyka on the other hand is unaware of the undercurrents going on inside the House of Elle and is simply delighted that she and Noah are friends now. What's more, they are constantly together because of their new duties. A big shocker awaits the two however as Noah discovers half of his moonstone in Lyka's pouch!
19	"Noah discovers that Lyka is Ulay!"
Noah brings out his own moonstone while staring at Lyka's. He quickly hides his however as Lyka returns from Selena's lab. Then he quizzes her about how she got her moonstone and learns for sure that she is indeed Ulay! Noah longs to reveal himself to Lyka but his military mission stops him from breaking his cover. As such, he contents himself by being more affectionate with her. Danger looms however over the unexpected reunion between Jay-Jay and Ulay as Selena discovers that the potency of Lyka's man-wolf genes exceeds beyond those of Lady Elle, who happens to be the most powerful in the clan of Waya! But Selena is troubled by the fact that Lyka's body is fighting the natural course of her transformation. Meanwhile, Anton finally accepts Vivian's offer to head her top-secret lab experiment. Anton insists though that his priority is still his personal research that promises to become a significant medical breakthrough. Then Vivian lets it slip that she is very much aware of what Anton is trying to do.
20	"Noah vows to protect Lyka"
Anton is getting desperate to find a cure on his sickness. As such, he injects his untried antidote on himself before collapsing on the floor, leaving Clara and Lyka in panic. Anton later apologizes to Lyka for his lack of caution only to feel threatened again as he hears Lyka's musings on her prospective suitor. Meanwhile, Lyka starts to sense that Noah is indeed her deceased childhood friend. She dismisses such foolish thoughts however, thinking that Noah's unfeeling attitude is so far from Jay-Jay's kindness. But Lyka becomes more confused since Noah is very thoughtful lately and has even promised to protect her the way Jay-Jay would! On the other hand, Noah is alarmed when he discovers that Gaby sets out an investigation on Lyka. Hence, he forces Lyka to resign from her job so she won’t be caught in the by-bust operation.

== See also ==
- Lobo
- ABS-CBN
