= List of 5 Star Specials episodes =

5 Star Specials is a weekly drama anthology aired every Wednesday evenings on TV5 from March 22 to September 1, 2010. This is featuring the talents of the station.

== Season one ==
=== The Diamond Star (Maricel Soriano) ===
==== Ang Dalawa Kong Nanay ====
- Air Date: March 22, 2010
- Starring: Roderick Paulate, Kim Dinosaur, Aliyah de Riva & Carlos Morales
  - Directed by: Soxie Topacio, Directors Guild of the Philippines, Inc. (DGPI)

==== Putik ====
- Air Date: March 29, 2010
- Starring: Nash Aguas & Perla Bautista
  - Directed by: Rahyan Carlos

==== Dedma si Lolo ====
- Air Date: April 5, 2010
- Starring: Eddie Garcia & Jay Manalo Guest: John Manalo
  - Directed by: Mel Chionglo

==== Bigti ====
- Air Date: April 12, 2010
- Starring: Cherry Pie Picache, Edgar Allan Guzman, Jade Lopez & Marky Lopez
  - Directed by: Eric Quizon

==== Girl, Boy, Bakla, Tomboy ====
- Air Date: April 19, 2010
- Starring: Eric Quizon, Jim Pebanco, Lorie Mara, JL Dizon, Niña Jose, Allen Dizon
  - Directed by: Joel Lamangan, DGPI

== Season two ==
=== Ruffa (Ruffa Gutierrez) ===
==== For Better or For Worse ====
- Air Date: April 26, 2010
- Starring: Zoren Legaspi
  - Directed by: Eric Quizon

==== Taong Bahay ====
- Air Date: May 3, 2010
- Starring: Paolo Contis
  - Directed by: Jose Javier Reyes

==== Who's the boss ====
- Air Date: May 19, 2010
- Starring: Jomari Yllana, Carla Humphries
  - Directed by: Joel Lamangan, DGPI

==== Venganza ====
- Air Date: May 26, 2010
- Starring: Phillip Salvador, Rochelle Barrameda, Jenny Miller, Victor Basa
  - Directed by: Argel Joseph

==== Preso ====
- Air Date: June 2, 2010
- Starring: Ian de Leon, Miriam Quiambao
  - Directed by: Gina Alajar

==== Ang Bestfriend kong Kabit ====
- Air Date: June 9, 2010
- Starring: Aiko Melendez, Jon Avila
  - Directed by: Jose Javier Reyes

== Season three ==
=== JC (JC De Vera) ===
==== Tato-45 ====
- Air Date: June 16, 2010
- Starring: Gardo Versoza
  - Directed by: Giuseppe Bede Sampedro

==== Kardong Kamao ====
- Air Date: June 23, and September 1, 2010 (replay)
- Starring: Sylvia Sanchez, Soliman Cruz, Spanky Manikan
  - Directed by: Robert Quebral

==== Johnny Salamangkero ====
- Air Date: June 30 and July 7, 2010
- Starring: Carla Humphries, Joross Gamboa, Michelle Madrigal, Charee Pineda
  - Directed by: Argel Joseph

==== Gabriel Molave ====
- Air Date: July 21 and July 28, 2010
- Starring: Megan Young and Epy Quizon
  - Directed by: Eric Quizon

==== Jak en Poy ====
- Air Date: August 4, 2010
- Starring: Empoy Marquez
  - Directed by: Robert Quebral

==== Papa Rusty ====
- Air Date: August 11, 2010
- Starring: Jaime Fabregas, Giselle Sanchez, Vandolf Quizon, Stef Prescott, Candy Pangilinan, Jairus Aquino
  - Directed by: Giuseppe Bede Sampedro

==== Si Paco at ang Prinsesa ====
- Air Date: August 18, 2010
- Starring: Carmen Soo, Diane Medina
  - Directed by: Bb. Joyce Bernal

==== Si Ali, si Oli at si Tommy ====
- Air Date: August 25, 2010
- Starring: Ruffa Gutierrez, Arci Muñoz
  - Directed by: Jose Javier Reyes
