= List of Linlang episodes =

Linlang is a Philippine thriller drama television series broadcast by Kapamilya Channel. It was first released on Amazon Prime Video from October 5, 2023, to November 16, 2023. Its television version aired from January 22 to June 14, 2024, on the channel's Primetime Bida line-up replacing Can't Buy Me Love.

== Series overview ==
Season	Episodes	Originally released		
Season	Episodes	First released	Last released	Network
1	14	October 5, 2023	November 16, 2023	Amazon Prime Video
2	103	January 22, 2024	June 14, 2024	Kapamilya Channel

== Episodes ==
=== Prime Video ===
No.	Title	Original release date
1	"Episode 1"	October 5, 2023
Previously a boxer, Victor Lualhati is now a seaman. He only desires to have a complete and content family with his wife, Juliana. Victor chooses to take some time off from work to spend time with his family after being away for a while. But as the days go by, he starts to notice big changes in his wife. Then, on Juliana's phone, he finds a disturbing message from an unidentified sender.
2	"Episode 2"	October 5, 2023
Victor hears Juliana's justifications for her wicked deeds. Their daughter, Abby, is in danger as a result of the mounting home problems caused by Victor's refusal to accept her explanation. Victor is determined to put the treachery behind him, but while he does so, he makes the startling discovery of Juliana's real paramour.
3	"Episode 3"	October 12, 2023
Victor pursues his inquiries relentlessly and develops friendships with Juliana's coworkers in an effort to identify his wife's mistress. Victor passes out while practicing boxing and deftly utilizes his medical emergency to trap Juliana's boyfriend, leading to a brutal encounter. On the most significant day of her career, Amelia learns Juliana's horrible secret.
4	"Episode 4"	October 12, 2023
Authorities learn about Juliana and Alex's illicit relationship via Victor. He doesn't have the hard data, though, to back up his assertion. Even worse, Sylvia's involvement in the scenario complicates things further by clearing her husband's name. Juliana later requests an annulment, alleging Victor's mental infirmity.
5	"Episode 5"	October 19, 2023
For Abby's sake, Victor and Juliana are forced to cohabitate in the large home. Unexpectedly, their family relationship begins to resemble what it once was, which makes Alex envious. Due to her infertility issues, Sylvia is thinking of adopting a child. When Juliana learns of this, it strains their friendship and puts their affair at risk of being revealed to their families.
6	"Episode 6"	October 19, 2023
Victor, with the assistance of an unlikely ally, returns to professional boxing to support his family while Juliana prepares to sell their home to test her estranged husband. Alex joins the firm as a partner. As the stakes rise, Juliana discovers something that would forever damage her and Alex. Victor goes to whatever lengths to learn his wife's secret since he is suspicious of her behavior.
7	"Episode 7"	October 26, 2023
Kate feels betrayed after discovering her sister’s dirty secret with her own eyes. Tension escalates when Juliana receives a malicious after-party photo of Victor. Even after the DNA test proves that he is the father of Juliana's unborn child, Victor remains skeptical about the result. The uncertainty causes anxiety for everyone, and yet only one person among them already has the answer.
8	"Episode 8"	October 26, 2023
Victor keeps Juliana kept away after her failed effort to flee and forbids her from seeing Abby. Victor decides to negotiate with Juliana after seeing Abby inconsolable and makes the offer to drop the adultery allegation in exchange for custody of the child. Despite Juliana's resistance, she ultimately consents to the deal—until another cunning scheme is revealed, which only serves to further Victor's mistrust of her.
9	"Episode 9"	November 2, 2023
Victor calls Sylvia, Alex's faithful wife, the greatest witness he can get against Alex as the adultery court date approaches. Victor discovers yet another shocking truth about who he is while raising money for his legal defense. The most significant component of Alex and Juliana's relationship—their unborn child—is put in jeopardy due to their desperation.
10	"Episode 10"	November 2, 2023
Everyone is impacted by the loss of Juliana and Alex's unborn child, even Victor. Even worse, now that Victor has conclusive evidence against the illicit pair, major legal issues await them. Tragically, Sylvia's love for Alex comes to an end. Many things have changed in the last few years, and Victor's future moves will soon be made public.
11	"Episode 11"	November 9, 2023
Victor wants to make up for everything he lost, especially his bond with his daughter Abby, after serving years in prison. It's unclear whether he will be able to establish his innocence and win back the confidence of people who matter to him, though, because Juliana still has misgivings about him. Alex, meanwhile, is trying to join Emilio's business as a partner, but there is resistance from an unidentified source.
12	"Episode 12"	November 9, 2023
While Alex and Emilio's relationship is in disarray, Victor deceives his sibling into joining with a fresh boxing organization. Victor's life is beginning to come together as he begins to win back Abby's admiration and eventually marries Olivia. Alex looks into who is helping his brother, and Victor finds out that Sylvia's death was not a fake after all.
13	"Episode 13"	November 16, 2023
Victor puts together a scheme to reveal Alex's adultery and violent actions toward Juliana. Juliana feels tormented because she regrets leaving Victor. Envious of the former couple's renewed bond, Olivia chooses to step in. But her scheme to expel Juliana from her and Victor's lives takes an unexpected turn.
14	"Episode 14"	November 16, 2023
A bruised Juliana returns home to Alex as Olivia is still missing. Alex surrenders to the police in order to confess, just as Victor is about to obtain a video that may help solve Sylvia's murder. Amelia is compelled to decide between her son and her values in the interim. Victor and Alex engage in a death match, with only one Lualhati emerging triumphant.

=== Television ===
No.	Title	TV title	Original release date	AGB Nielsen Ratings (NUTAM People)
1	"Life is a Boxing Ring"	"Pasabog"	January 22, 2024	9.0%
2	"Time Apart"	"Sakripisyo"	January 23, 2024	9.9%
3	"Seeds of Doubt"	"Pagbabago"	January 24, 2024	7.8%
4	"The Better Brother"	"Kutob"	January 25, 2024	8.9%
5	"The Chase"	"Sundan"	January 26, 2024	7.6%
6	"Bloody Fist"	"Bugbog"	January 29, 2024	7.9%
7	"Meet Olivia"	"Patawad"	January 30, 2024	8.6%
8	"Missing"	"Aksidente"	January 31, 2024	8.4%
9	"Lies After Lies"	"Huli"	February 1, 2024	10.0%
10	"The Real Lover"	"Kabit"	February 2, 2024	8.8%
11	"Back to Training"	"Hiwalay"	February 5, 2024	8.5%
12	"False Positive"	"Gulong Gulo"	February 6, 2024	8.9%
13	"Lie Low"	"Boksing"	February 7, 2024	7.0%
14	"Come Clean"	"Impormasyon"	February 8, 2024	9.0%
15	"False Positive"	"Tagapagtanggol"	February 9, 2024	7.8%
16	"The Applauded Mother"	"Sampalan"	February 12, 2024	8.4%
17	"Fell on Trap"	"Uliran"	February 13, 2024	9.7%
18	"Blackmail"	"Tagpuan"	February 14, 2024	7.5%
19	"Caught in the Act"	"Taksil"	February 15, 2024	8.9%
20	"Evidence"	"Sinungaling"	February 16, 2024	9.9%
21	"Ally or Foe"	"Banat"	February 19, 2024	10.0%
22	"The Warning"	"Anak"	February 20, 2024	9.4%
23	"Barter"	"Kaso"	February 21, 2024	10.0%
24	"Summoned"	"Higanti"	February 22, 2024	9.5%
25	"Conjugal"	"Mansion"	February 23, 2024	9.7%
26	"Playhouse"	"Pamilya"	February 26, 2024	9.0%
27	"Sabotage"	"Selos"	February 27, 2024	8.4%
28	"Cuff Link"	"Pruweba"	February 28, 2024	8.9%
29	"Invitation"	"Imbitasyon"	February 29, 2024	9.7%
30	"House Blessing"	"Bendisyon"	March 1, 2024	9.3%
31	"One Up"	"Ampon"	March 4, 2024	9.8%
32	"Snatcher"	"Ebidensiya"	March 5, 2024	9.7%
33	"Tormented Grandmother"	"Huling Huli"	March 6, 2024	10.5%
34	"First Day at Work"	"Takot"	March 7, 2024	10.7%
35	"The Associate"	"Surpresa"	March 8, 2024	9.9%
36	"Underground"	"Illegal"	March 11, 2024	8.7%
37	"Signed"	"Ambisyosa"	March 12, 2024	8.8%
38	"Family Outing"	"Nahilo"	March 13, 2024	9.1%
39	"Morning Sickness"	"Panalo"	March 14, 2024	8.7%
40	"Threatened"	"Buntis"	March 15, 2024	8.2%
41	"Childhood Crush"	"Kaibigan"	March 18, 2024	11.0%
42	"Suspecting Husband"	"Check Up"	March 19, 2024	9.4%
43	"You're the Father"	"Aborsyon"	March 20, 2024	10.2%
44	"DNA Test"	"Gumugulo"	March 21, 2024	10.0%
45	"Troubled Heart"	"Galit"	March 22, 2024	9.2%
46	"The Real Father"	"Resulta"	March 25, 2024	9.1%
47	"Just Friends"	"Pagtataka"	March 26, 2024	8.1%
48	"Due Date"	"Alagaan"	March 27, 2024	8.3%
49	"Drugged"	"Patibong"	April 1, 2024	9.4%
50	"Set Up"	"Desperado"	April 2, 2024	9.7%
51	"Confrontations"	"Tiwala"	April 3, 2024	9.4%
52	"The Hidden Player"	"Nandaya"	April 4, 2024	11.1%
53	"Connivance"	"Katotohanan"	April 5, 2024	9.3%
54	"Failed Escape"	"Takas"	April 8, 2024	10.1%
55	"Banished"	"Sukdulan"	April 9, 2024	10.3%
56	"On the Run"	"Pagtago"	April 10, 2024	9.7%
57	"Deal"	"Karamay"	April 11, 2024	10.1%
58	"I See You"	"Desisyon"	April 12, 2024	8.9%
59	"Trap"	"Arestado"	April 15, 2024	9.6%
60	"Case Filed"	"Buwelta"	April 16, 2024	9.6%
61	"Court Hearing"	"Awa"	April 17, 2024	9.5%
62	"The Legitimate Son"	"Napaikot"	April 18, 2024	10.2%
63	"Out in the Open"	"Bastardo"	April 19, 2024	9.7%
64	"Unexpected Traitor"	"Palaban"	April 22, 2024	11.0%
65	"Miscarriage"	"Karma"	April 23, 2024	10.1%
66	"Pleading"	"Lumuhod"	April 24, 2024	10.0%
67	"A Woman Scorned"	"Magpatayan"	April 25, 2024	9.7%
68	"Framed Up"	"Trahedya"	April 26, 2024	10.0%
69	"The Trial"	"Kriminal"	April 29, 2024	11.0%
70	"Roles Reversed"	"Kampeon"	April 30, 2024	11.0%
71	"Released"	"Pagbabalik"	May 1, 2024	10.0%
72	"Counterpunch"	"Simula"	May 2, 2024	11.0%
73	"Pleading"	"Pakiusap"	May 3, 2024	9.0%
74	"Concerned Parents"	"Regalo"	May 6, 2024	10.8%
75	"Reunited Family"	"Nagkasundo"	May 7, 2024	10.0%
76	"Enemy Against Enemy"	"Pinalayas"	May 8, 2024	9.7%
77	"A Daughter's Discovery"	"Suspensyon"	May 9, 2024	9.5%
78	"The Backer"	"Kasabwat"	May 10, 2024	10.0%
79	"Reconciled"	"Pakinggan"	May 13, 2024	11.0%
80	"Seeds of Title"	"Malimutan"	May 14, 2024	11.4%
81	"Contract with the Devil"	"Nagulat"	May 15, 2024	10.0%
82	"Engaged"	"Papakasalan"	May 16, 2024	11.0%
83	"The Wedding Organizer"	"Salu-salo"	May 17, 2024	9.0%
84	"The Awaited Wedding"	"Pangako"	May 20, 2024	11.0%
85	"Two Different Marriages"	"Nanggulo"	May 21, 2024	11.0%
86	"Reminisce"	"Magkakasama"	May 22, 2024	8.9%
87	"The Lie"	"Pagdududa"	May 23, 2024	9.0%
88	"Once a Cheater"	"Babae"	May 24, 2024	8.2%
89	"The Stepdaughter"	"Pagbawalan"	May 27, 2024	11.0%
90	"A Winner and A Loser"	"Saktan"	May 28, 2024	9.0%
91	"Karma"	"Salarin"	May 29, 2024	8.2%
92	"Misled"	"Kasambahay"	May 30, 2024	11.3%
93	"Part of the Plan"	"Huling Huli"	May 31, 2024	9.0%
94	"Abused"	"Bugbog"	June 3, 2024	9.1%
95	"Locked Up"	"Pagsisisi"	June 4, 2024	11.0%
96	"The Jealous Wife"	"Magkakampi"	June 5, 2024	10.0%
97	"The Next Victim"	"Nawawala"	June 6, 2024	9.6%
98	"Another Discovery"	"CCTV Footage"	June 7, 2024	8.7%
99	"An Ex Wife's Redemption"	"Magpanggap"	June 10, 2024	10.2%
100	"The Second Frame Up"	"Binaligtad"	June 11, 2024	11.5%
101	"The Real Culprit"	"Pagtakbo"	June 12, 2024	10.7%
102	"Fight to the Death"	"Magkapatid"	June 13, 2024	12.0%
103	"The Last Round"	"Sagarang Pagtatapos"	June 14, 2024	12.0%
