= List of Maging Sino Ka Man (2006 TV series) episodes =

The following is a complete list of episodes from the ABS-CBN primetime drama series Maging Sino Ka Man.

The pilot episode, which introduced the main characters of the TV series, aired as a 1.5 hour special on October 6, 2006. Regular primetime broadcast began three days later on October 9.

A total of 164 episodes aired in this series. The final episode was aired on May 25, 2007. This list is ordered by the original airdates in the Philippines.

== Series overview ==
Special pilot episode

Week	Starting Airdate
1	October 9, 2006
2	October 16, 2006
3	October 23, 2006
4	October 30, 2006
5	November 6, 2006
6	November 13, 2006
7	November 20, 2006
8	November 27, 2006
9	December 4, 2006
10	December 11, 2006
11	December 18, 2006

Week	Starting Airdate
12	December 25, 2006
13	January 1, 2007
14	January 8, 2007
15	January 15, 2007
16	January 22, 2007
17	January 29, 2007
18	February 5, 2007
19	February 12, 2007
20	February 19, 2007
21	February 26, 2007
22	March 5, 2007

Week	Starting Airdate
23	March 12, 2007
24	March 19, 2007
25	March 26, 2007
26	April 2, 2007
27	April 9, 2007
28	April 16, 2007
29	April 23, 2007
30	April 30, 2007
31	May 7, 2007
32	May 14, 2007
33	May 21, 2007

== Episodes ==
All airdates for each episode are those from the Philippines.

=== Special pilot episode ===
No.	Title	Original release date
1	"Pilot"	October 6, 2006
The series begins with the cold-blooded shooting of an unknown man as he tries to escape with a crying infant in his arms. When the shooting victim falls, mortally wounded, into a nearby river, the baby he is carrying floats away in a basin. The story continues many years later. The baby, Eli, is now a grown man. He is good-hearted and works hard at multiple jobs to help his family make ends meet. The four main characters meet for the first time at a special party onboard the luxury liner: Eli - working as a waiter; JB - the heir apparent to the shipping empire; Jackie - JB's girlfriend and the daughter of a wealthy and successful banker, who always tries to be the perfect daughter and perfect girlfriend, and Celine - Jackie's cousin, who is also Jackie's exact opposite in attitude. His dad's illness and his desire to be with his wife abroad drive Eli's brother, Pong, to take part in an attempt to kidnap Jackie—with disastrous consequences.

=== Week 1 ===
In this week's episodes, the Madrigal, Magsaysay, and Berenguer families mistakenly believe that Jackie is dead. Eli hides Jackie in one of the provincial towns, while Pong tries to convince Dadoods to move away. Jackie awakens at last with no memory of what happened, and her efforts to be the 'perfect wife' lead to several uncomfortable moments for Eli. JB's attempt to find peace and serenity backfires when he and Celine end up marooned together.

No.	Title	Original release date
2	"01-1"	October 9, 2006
The Madrigal family mistakenly thinks that the charred body found at the accident site is Jackie’s corpse. JB and Celine grieve in their own ways at the news of Jackie's death. Eli carries an unconscious Jackie into a small provincial town and destroys evidence of her identity, while telling his curious neighbors that Jackie is his wife. Eli's neighbors remain nosy and persistent.
3	"01-2"	October 10, 2006
Celine escorts a half-conscious JB to his home after a night of heavy drinking, only to be insulted by his mother. Eli leaves a still-unconscious Jackie sleeping to call Pong and assure him that they'll figure a way out of this predicament. Eli panics when he returns to find Jackie awake for the first time, sitting up in bed, while their outraged neighbors are waiting for him.
4	"01-3"	October 11, 2006
Eli cannot bring himself to abandon a catatonic Jackie, despite imminent danger to his father's health. JB rejects the food that Celine brings to him at work. Eli looks after a non-responsive Jackie to the best of his ability. JB's mother urges him to move on, and says he'll find someone else—as long as it's not Celine. Celine invites JB to a get-together for Jackie, but he is noncommittal. Eli panics when "Princess" appears to become lucid for a moment during a town party. Celine tries to cheer up her Uncle Fidel, but he rejects her efforts.
5	"01-4"	October 12, 2006
Eli tries to bathe Jackie, but ends up needing a cold shower himself. Imelda (Celine's mother and Fidel's sister) advises her brother to not make rash decisions (such as selling the house) while he's still in grief. JB disapproves of the party Celine hosts in honor of Jackie's memory. Eli tries to visit Fidel at his office. Pong can't convince Dadoods to move to a new home. Eli learns that he missed an important final interview. Celine visits JB's yacht to apologize for her outburst, but instead becomes an unwitting stowaway. Jackie finally comes out of her stupor.
6	"01-5"	October 13, 2006
Eli's panic subsides when he realizes Jackie remembers nothing. The town quack blames Jackie's amnesia on a magical enchantment and promises to break the spell. JB is marooned with Celine when his yacht's engine won't start. Jackie finds Eli's cellphone and starts to read the messages. Eli struggles to answer Jackie's endless questions. Celine infuriates JB by sunbathing instead of helping. Jackie learns from the neighbors that Eli was a devoted husband while she was ill. Celine rescues JB from the sea. Eli chokes when Jackie asks for a kiss.

=== Week 2 ===
In this week's episodes, Eli battles with guilt and temptation while Jackie deals with the harsh realities of a poor, provincial life. Jackie still has many questions about her forgotten past, but she is determined to be a perfect wife to Eli. JB sees Celine in a whole new light after being marooned on an island with her. Celine resolves to move on after admitting to herself that she can't compete with Jackie's memory for JB's love, but it seems JB has new ideas of his own. Aling Bebeng's search for her own daughter brings Jackie to Manila, where Celine sees her.

No.	Title	Original release date
7	"02-1"	October 16, 2006
Celine tells JB he's been stung by a sea urchin and needs to pee on himself, only to realize that she has to be the one to do it. Jackie asks Eli why he doesn't wear a wedding ring, forcing him to feign anger to escape from more questions. Jackie wonders why she felt nothing when she kissed Eli, and concludes she needs a longer kiss. Celine is happy when she manages to start a campfire, but then realizes that JB is running a fever. In his fever-induced delirium, JB hurts Celine's feelings by calling her Jackie.
8	"02-2"	October 17, 2006
Pong fails to see Fidel because a police officer is there. Jackie doesn't know what to make of a note from Eli; the neighbors say he just misses being intimate with her. Eli starts work at a construction site. Jackie starts doing housework, but she's terrible at it. Celine constructs a makeshift roof over an unconscious JB when it rain on the beach. JB awakens to find Celine grilling a fish over the campfire. JB and Celine agree to a truce. Eli is upset when Jackie finds the letter about his scholarship interview.
9	"02-3"	October 18, 2006
Princess gets marital advice from the neighbors. JB's mother alerts the coast guard. Eli is overwhelmed with guilt when he sees cuts on Jackie's hands from doing housework. Pong's kidnapping accomplices pay him an unwelcome visit. Celine and JB enjoy a light moment. Princess tells Eli she's ready for intimacy, but Eli proves to her she's not. JB realizes he knows very little about Celine. Celine tells JB he must learn to live without Jackie. Princess dreams about her father, and wakes up crying. Eli is forced to lie when Jackie asks to see her father.
10	"02-4"	October 19, 2006
Eli tells Jackie a good family found her when she was a baby and raised her as their own; in reality he was sharing his own story. JB and Celine are rescued. Corazon furiously tells JB he was stupid to have been stranded. Celine admits that she can't compete for JB's love. Eli finds a love note in the lunch Jackie prepared for him. Jackie witnesses a fight between Mang Simo and Aling Bebeng. Eli berates Pong for not talking to Fidel. Jackie decides to accompany Aling Bebeng to Manila. Pong tells Eli he feels guilt because he's in love.
11	"02-5"	October 20, 2006
Eli tells Pong to do his job. JB thinks of calling Celine. Celine cries as she leafs through her scrapbook and makes a new entry. JB invites Celine to dinner, but she doesn't say yes. Eli works overtime to avoid seeing Jackie. Jackie accompanies Aling Bebeng to Manila. Eli panics the next day when he finds Jackie gone. JB invites Celine to lunch. Eli calls Pong and asks him to look for Jackie while he makes his way to Manila. Celine climbs the steps of JB's ship then sees Jackie walking on the docks. Jackie looks up and sees Celine waving at her.

=== Week 3 ===
In this week's episodes, Celine sees Jackie at the docks, but can't convince anyone else that her cousin is still alive. Eli struggles with Jackie's fervent wish to 'renew' their marriage vows. Eli's foreman at the quarry recognizes the pendant on his necklace, and decides not to lay him off. JB offers Celine a job, and admits he needs her by his side to inspire him in his quest for freedom. Despite her own doubts about the situation, Celine accepts JB's job offer to run the next major event for his luxury liner. JB's backstory is revealed in flashbacks from his childhood, and new tensions arise between JB and his mother.

No.	Title	Original release date
12	"03-1"	October 23, 2006
Celine tries to chase Jackie but Gio stops her, saying her guilty conscience is conjuring ghosts. When JB angrily asks Celine why she stood him up, Celine does not explain. Aling Bebeng finds her daughter. Pong does not find Jackie at the pier. JB is too angry to focus at work. Celine talks to Jackie's photo. Jackie and Aling Bebeng go back home. Eli gets to Manila but only stays long enough to have dinner with Pong and Dadoods. JB has a tense dinner with his mother. Eli picks a fight with Jackie when he gets home.
13	"03-2"	October 24, 2006
Jackie realizes that Eli truly cares for her, and forgives him for picking a fight. JB's friend asks if he has discussed their project with Celine. Celine avoids talking to JB at a bar. Jackie gives a sleeping Eli a massage that he enjoys – until he wakes up. Celine goes jogging but somehow ends up in church. Eli gives in to pressure and hears mass with Jackie and the neighbors. JB prepares a breakfast picnic and apologizes to Celine. Pong feels guilty when Dadoods misses Eli. Celine tells JB she saw Jackie at the pier.
14	"03-3"	October 25, 2006
JB says he sees Jackie every day, everywhere. The neighbors tell Jackie she's blessed to have Eli. Jackie blows Eli kisses. JB asks Celine to help him move on. Jackie is hurt when Eli rejects her suggestion to renew their marriage vows. Celine says no when JB asks her to manage his event. Celine proves to JB that he's really a "Mama's Boy". Eli tells Pong he's afraid that once Jackie is well, she will never forgive him. JB and his mother clash about his work and his father. JB broods as he remembers good times with his father, and later, his father's death.
15	"03-4"	October 26, 2006
When JB's Aunt Gloria tries to cheer him up, it's obvious that this is not the first time. Jackie gives Eli the silent treatment. JB sees Celine with a client at the driving range. Eli feels pressure from the neighborhood wives. Jackie moves out. Gio tells Celine she should accept JB's job offer and give her love a chance. Eli talks in his sleep. Jackie believes Eli is cheating on her. Celine avoids JB. Eli's foreman at the quarry recognizes his necklace and decides not to lay him off. Mang Simo gives Jackie sensible advice. Eli serenades Jackie, to no effect.
16	"03-5"	October 27, 2006
Celine finds JB waiting when she gets home. Jackie watches as couples renew their vows. JB tells Celine he needs her by his side to inspire him. Jackie tells Eli she knows their marriage is a sham. Celine tells Gio she accepted JB's proposal. Eli laughs with relief when he realizes why Jackie is upset. Jackie is moved when Eli says he wants her to remember everything before they renew their vows. Celine awakens to find roses from JB at the foot of her bed. Time passes sweetly for Eli and Jackie. JB watches with satisfaction as Celine make progress at work.

=== Week 4 ===
In this week's episodes, Eli's relationship with Jackie is strained further, until a series of events leads Jackie to believe she was unfaithful to Eli. Celine delivers exceptional results at her new job, and wins the grudging praise of Corazon. Eli brings Jackie to Manila, intending to return her to her family, but things do not go as planned. JB and Celine grow closer and JB starts to wonder if he is ready to move on.

No.	Title	Original release date
17	"04-1"	October 30, 2006
JB invites Celine to grab a bite after a long day at work. Jackie receives a gift. Celine collapses into bed and falls asleep despite Gio's phone call. Jackie confesses her love for Eli, but Eli doesn't respond the way she expects. Hurt, Jackie tries to leave but ends up needing rescue. Jackie gives Eli the silent treatment and later dreams about receiving a marriage proposal (JB's). The next day, Celine prepares to deliver her presentation to a hostile Corazon. Confronted by Jackie, Eli breaks down and confesses that everything he's ever told her is a lie.
18	"04-2"	October 31, 2006
Eli asks Jackie to forgive him, but Jackie throws him out. At Celine's presentation, JB is too quiet and Corazon walks out. JB asks Corazon to give Celine, and himself, a chance. Eli tells Mang Simo everything. Jackie learns that there was another man in her forgotten past. Celine quits the job and rejects JB's calls. Eli tells Pong they can't delay things much longer. JB visits Celine, but she's not in the mood to talk. Jackie remembers flashes of moments with JB and feels guilty. Jackie hugs Eli and asks for forgiveness when he gets home.
19	"04-3"	November 1, 2006
Eli and Jackie start anew. Jackie promises to never leave Eli. JB jumps into Celine's pool and says he stands by her. At work, JB gives Celine a stress ball; she gives him an orange. Jackie gets her neighbors' wishlists. Eli's foreman tells him he's got a job if he returns. Celine meets Corazon with stress ball in hand. Eli considers it a sign when his car starts. The barrio gathers for a despedida. JB surprises Celine by joining her when she starts singing at a bar. Eli and Jackie express their heartfelt thanks to their neighbors.
20	"04-4"	November 2, 2006
JB says Jackie introduced him to music. Someone takes photos of JB and Celine leaving the bar. Eli brings Jackie to Binondo, hoping she'll remember. Celine tells JB she's seeing Mr. Romero for lunch. Jackie enjoys a stroll on Baywalk. Mr. Romero is offended when JB tells him Celine is not for sale. Eli brings Jackie to her father's office building. Celine assures an angry Corazon that she will take care of Mr. Romero. While Eli moves the car, Jackie enters the building alone and sees Fidel Madrigal's name in the lobby.
21	"04-5"	November 3, 2006
Imelda walks past Jackie in the lobby without seeing her. Eli drives away. Celine tells JB she's meeting Mr. Romero. Dadoods calls Eli's cellphone and Jackie answers. Eli walks along Baywalk, depressed. Corazon admits to JB that she's starting to like Celine. A shocked Eli finds Jackie at home with Dadoods. JB looks at a photo of Jackie and asks if she will forgive him if he moves on and finds someone else. Jackie dreams about JB's marriage proposal. Confronted, Eli confesses to truth to Dadoods.

=== Week 5 ===
In this week's episodes, Jackie endears herself to Dadoods and Pong, and makes Eli's birthday very happy. Eli gains his father's blessing to continue deceiving Jackie. Kevin Romero pursues Celine, and demonstrates that he doesn't give up easily. Jackie continues to dream every night, and remembers a little more each time. JB struggles to make sense of his feelings for Celine, and admits to feeling jealous. Jackie and Eli return to the province. Celine decides to fight destiny, only to be disappointed.

No.	Title	Original release date
22	"05-1"	November 6, 2006
Celine turns down JB's lunch and dinner invites. Gio reminds Celine that friends can also be lovers. Eli tries but fails to speak to Fidel Madrigal. JB checks Celine's calendar. Dadoods is uneasy watching Jackie and Eli at dinner. JB finds Celine with a younger Mr. Romero. Eli tells Jackie Dadoods is ill. Jackie vows to prove herself to Dadoods. JB fumes in his car as he watches Celine with Mr. Romero. Pong makes a late-night visit. Eli tries to get medical advice for amnesia. Dadoods asks Jackie how she would feel if he tells her Eli was lying all this time.
23	"05-2"	November 7, 2006
Jackie says Eli wouldn't lie because he loves her. JB asks Celine about her date. Corazon congratulates Celine and JB for her success with the Romeros. JB surprises Celine with a congratulatory kiss. Dadoods tells Eli they should send Jackie home. Jackie dreams and remembers JB's name. Celine ignores JB's many calls as she spends her day with Kevin Romero. Dadoods tells Jackie about his late wife Eloisa. JB is pensive at dinner with Corazon and Gloria. Eli practices telling Jackie the truth. An angry JB shocks Celine by admitting that he's jealous.
24	"05-3"	November 8, 2006
JB drives away, upset. Imelda tells Celine that loving JB is like fighting destiny. Eli tries to tell Jackie the truth as Dadoods looks on. Dadoods gives Eli permission to continue living the lie. Celine decides to fight destiny. JB confesses to Gloria that he can't risk letting himself fall for Celine. Jackie dreams and remembers seeing Eli at a party; Eli tells her it was a masquerade. Celine receives a bouquet of flowers and is disappointed to learn they're from Kevin. Jackie remembers Eli's birthday and decides to go to the market alone.
25	"05-4"	November 9, 2006
Jackie tries to find ingredients that fit her budget. Eli admits to Pong that he's taking a gamble on love. Celine learns that Kevin will be her Romero contact. Dadoods tries to find Jackie but bumps into someone else. JB pulls rank and assigns Celine to another account. Piqued, Celine accepts Kevin's invitation. Jackie sees a magazine featuring the cruise ship and sees JB's name. Pong almost runs over Jackie with his cab. Celine complains to Gio about JB's mixed signals. Eli has a very happy birthday. Jackie and Eli return to the province.
26	"05-5"	November 10, 2006
Aling Bebeng and Mang Simo welcome Jackie and Eli back to their barrio. Mang Simo tells Eli that fate is keeping him and Jackie together. Celine goes island hopping with Kevin, but wards off his advances. JB and Kevin come to blows at the beach. Eli returns to work at the quarry and deals with questions from the foreman. Jackie dreams and remembers more of the party. Corazon tells Celine the Romero account is at risk. Celine berates herself for even thinking JB might love her. Kevin tells Celine she'll have her deal if he gets what he wants.

=== Week 6 ===
In this week's episodes, Celine finds the strength to deal with Kevin Romero's blackmail attempt, but Corazon is furious when the Romero account is lost. Jackie continues to remember more of her past, but is determined to focus on her present with Eli. Eli gives Jackie his pendant, and finds a way to buy Jackie a wedding ring. Imelda hints at a past relationship between Corazon and Fidel. When JB and Celine go camping to get away from it all, Celine confesses her love for JB, and he admits to needing her. Celine and Jackie bump into each other at the town market, but Jackie runs away. JB is furious when Corazon shows him photos. Upset, Celine drives too fast and doesn't see an oncoming truck until it's too late. Jackie hits her head and remembers everything when she wakes up. She boards a bus and returns to her father's home, just as Fidel looks out the window and sees her.

No.	Title	Original release date
27	"06-1"	November 13, 2006
Kevin gives Celine two days. Jackie tries to draw JB's face from memory. Corazon reprimands JB and the management team. Celine accepts Kevin's offer. Gio asks Celine if she's compromising her morals for JB. Jackie remembers Fidel calling her 'anak'. Fidel returns from his trip. Aling Bebeng tells Jackie Eli is more important than her memories. Eli promises Jackie they'll make new memories. JB and Celine share a room in Davao. Eli spends a romantic day with Jackie. Celine and JB explore the resort. JB surprises Celine with a necklace.
28	"06-2"	November 14, 2006
Celine tells JB danger makes life less ordinary. Eli feigns sleep to avoid intimacy. Mang Simo gives Eli an herbal fix. JB and Celine close the deal at the resort. When Eli has stomach pains, Mang Simo tells Jackie that he needs rest. Celine tells JB she didn't know how to deal with Kevin's threat. JB offers to get Celine a dog they can care for together. An unknown photographer takes photos of JB and Celine. Princess sees JB's face when she looks at Eli. JB tells Celine to forget the Romero account. Jackie wants to forget the man in her memories.
29	"06-3"	November 15, 2006
Eli gives Jackie his pendant. Jackie tears up her drawing of JB. Celine tells Kevin the deal is off. Corazon furiously orders JB to stop defending Celine. Jackie promises to forget the man in her past. Celine invites JB to do something crazy. Aling Bebeng promises to help Jackie get Eli a gift. JB and Celine shop for supplies. Corazon learns that JB and Celine have left the office. JB and Celine join a camping group. JB tells Celine she makes him happy, and looks ready to say more...
30	"06-4"	November 16, 2006
Celine asks JB if he's starting to like her. Imelda tells Corazon she has another source of comfort now that Fidel is back. Mang Simo advises Eli to make the most of the time left. The wives secretly bake goodies to help Jackie raise money. JB and Celine unwind with the campers. Eli asks Jackie when she was most happy. Celine confesses her love for JB. Jackie sets up her stall at the town market. JB and Celine pose for a photo. Eli looks for a ring for Jackie. Celine gets the shock of her life when she bumps into Jackie at the market.
31	"06-5"	November 17, 2006
Jackie doesn't recognize Celine and runs away. The foreman gives Eli a loan. Celine doesn't tell JB. Jackie falls and hits her head when a fire breaks out. JB is furious when Corazon shows him the photos. Celine drives too fast. Jackie awakens in the fire and remembers everything. Guada and Aling Bebeng search for Jackie. Jackie boards a bus. Eli finds an empty house when he comes home with the ring. Corazon laments to Gloria that everyone forgets her sacrifices. Eli learns of the fire. Jackie arrives at her father's house as Fidel opens a window and sees her.

=== Week 7 ===
In this week's episodes, a new chapter begins when Jackie remembers her past and returns to her father's home, with no memory of her time with Eli. Celine is heartbroken, but she tells JB she's willing to wait until he can tell Jackie about them. JB finds himself torn and uncertain about his feelings. Corazon tells JB only he can choose between Jackie and Celine. Eli is hurt when he realizes that Jackie can no longer remember him, although the news is cause for relief for Pong and Dadoods. Jackie surprises everyone with some new habits and preferences. Monique tries to speak to Jackie, but an enraged Fidel warns her to stay away. Eli can't stay away and follows Jackie to her dinner with JB.

No.	Title	Original release date
32	"07-1"	November 20, 2006
Aling Bebeng weeps as fire fighters work at the market. JB gets a call from Gio. Don Fidel and Jackie are reunited. A frantic JB learns Celine is okay. Celine tells Gio she can't let JB go when they just started. Eli is overwhelmed by his loss. Celine sees her photo on JB's phone, but sees videos with Jackie too. JB and Celine check into a hotel. Eli believes Jackie must be well for her to leave him. Jackie awakens with no memory of her time with Eli and learns of the events from Fidel. Jackie reacts when Fidel calls her 'Princess'.
33	"07-2"	November 21, 2006
Eli tells Dadoods he can't just sit and wait. Jackie asks Fidel about JB. JB tells Celine that Jackie is now a memory, and that memories fade. Jackie gives herself a pep talk. Eli follows a messenger but is blocked by guards. Jackie learns that Monique has been leaving flowers at the gate every day since her 'death'. Corazon learns that Jackie is alive. JB tells Celine he doesn't like disappointing his mother. Celine offers to resign. Corazon interrupts a moment of fun between JB and Celine. Eli and Jackie come face to face at the subdivision entrance.
34	"07-3"	November 22, 2006
Jackie does not recognize Eli. Corazon asks to speak to JB alone. Jackie visits Tatay Peping at the hospital. Eli gets into a fistfight. Fidel and Jackie visit Imelda. Eli tells Pong he saw Jackie. Corazon stuns JB by apologizing. Imelda advises Fidel to stay quiet about Jackie's amnesia. Corazon gives JB and Celine false hope. Eli mourns his loss. Fidel resists when Jackie asks to see Monique. JB and Celine arrive at JB's home only to be stunned when Jackie and Fidel walk into the living room as Corazon looks on, smiling.
35	"07-4"	November 23, 2006
Celine learns Jackie can't remember. Corazon asks JB if he will turn his back on Jackie for Celine. Jackie says she can see a difference in JB. Jackie asks Celine if she has a boyfriend. Eli wonders if Jackie would look for him if she remembers him. Jackie feels that something's missing. JB doesn't know if he loves Jackie. Monique learns that Jackie's back. Jackie tries to convince herself she's okay. Jackie surprises the househelp by making breakfast. Eli tells Dadoods he'll look for work. Celine tells JB she's tendering her resignation, but JB asks her not to leave.
36	"07-5"	November 24, 2006
Celine agrees to have dinner with JB. Fidel is surprised by changes in Jackie. JB can't back out of dinner when Jackie calls. A coconut vendor offers to help Eli. Monique sees Jackie with Fidel. Corazon tells Celine she doesn't want cheap women around her son. Fidel sends Jackie inside and angrily orders Monique to stay away. Monique meets Eli and the coconut vendor. Eli misses Jackie when she leaves to see her doctor. Eli waits outside Fidel's office. Monique drinks to drown her pain. Eli follows Jackie and finally sees her through a restaurant window.

=== Week 8 ===
In this week's episodes, JB continues to be torn between Celine and Jackie, while Celine grows impatient waiting for the right time for Jackie to learn the truth. Eli mourns the loss of his relationship with Jackie, until a visit from his mother in a dream brings him to his senses. Fidel finds it hard to say no when Jackie is determined to build a relationship with her mother, Monique. Instead, he decides to send Jackie to the US to seek treatment for her amnesia, and sends Imelda to warn Monique about attending Jackie's party.

No.	Title	Original release date
37	"08-1"	November 27, 2006
Celine waits and finally gets a text message. JB meets Jackie at the restaurant. Eli is heartbroken when he sees JB and Jackie together. Jackie remembers JB's favorites. Gio learns that Jackie is alive. JB disapproves of the changes in Jackie. Pong and Dadoods worry about a drunken Eli. Fidel gives Jackie permission to see Monique. Celine tells JB she can wait. Jackie sleeps on the floor. Fidel is confused by the changes in Jackie. Monique is shocked when Jackie arrives. Fidel watches Jackie from his car. Monique sobs as she hugs Jackie tightly.
38	"08-2"	November 28, 2006
Jackie is happy after seeing Monique. Dadoods worries about Eli as his son continues to grieve. Jackie prefers the dipper to a bubble bath. Fidel worries about the changes in Jackie. JB's dinner with Celine is interrupted. Monique tells Jackie she will forever regret the day she left her. Dadoods lies and tells Pong he's taking his meds. Eli's mother talks to him in a dream. Dadoods hides his chest pain from Eli. Celine plans a date with JB, but he joins Jackie at church instead and does not answer Celine's call.
39	"08-3"	November 29, 2006
Eli excels at his new job. A pensive JB drops Jackie off at her mom's. Celine is still upset when JB arrives. Jackie learns that her mom's not feeling well. Celine is furious when Imelda tells her not to hurt Jackie. JB admits he can't choose. Dadoods and Pong are relieved to see Eli in good spirits. Fidel is unhappy when Jackie visits Monique again. Eli sees Jackie's kidnapper. Fidel orders Jackie home after finding her doing laundry with Monique. Fidel tells Jackie he's sending her to the States. Monique learns the bad news. Celine sets up dinner with JB and Jackie.
40	"08-4"	November 30, 2006
Eli ignores the taunting of Pong's kidnapping accomplices. Monique gives Jackie a going-away gift. Eli misses Jackie. Jackie is touched by her mother's letter. At dinner, Celine makes sure Jackie suspects something between her and JB. JB tells Celine to stop acting like a jealous wife. Celine leaves the dinner upset. JB asks Jackie to trust him. Gio asks Celine what she's done now. Gloria resists taking meds from Corazon when JB arrives. Jackie asks Fidel how he learned of Monique's infidelity.
41	"08-5"	December 1, 2006
Corazon tells JB she married his father for his money. Fidel tells Jackie he's loved two women; the first didn't love him back, while the second, Monique, betrayed him. JB asks Corazon if she regrets marrying someone she didn't love. Jackie tells Fidel he still loves Monique. Celine receives flowers from JB. Celine goes to tell Jackie the truth, only to see two large bouquets arrive for her cousin. Eli leaves for the province to see Mang Simo. Imelda asks Monique not to go to Jackie's party. When Celine confronts JB, he tells her "I never... said... that I loved you."

=== Week 9 ===
In this week's episodes, flashbacks reveal how Celine and JB first met as teenagers one summer, with JB quickly falling for Celine and telling her she's the girl he'll one day marry. But Corazon intervenes and arranges for JB and Jackie to meet. Eli returns to the province to update Mang Simo, and they tell everyone that Jackie had to stay in Manila for work. JB finally remembers his past with Celine and chooses her over Jackie, just as Celine gives up on a relationship with JB and decides to go after the Romero account so she can resign "with a bang." Eli tries to prevent a crime and gets stabbed for his trouble. In the process, he meets JB and gets a hospital visit from Jackie, who still does not remember him.

No.	Title	Original release date
42	"09-1"	December 4, 2006
Celine slaps JB then escapes to her car. Flashbacks show how Celine and JB first met. Imelda tells Jackie that Celine's not in. Imelda warns Celine to say nothing about JB because they need Fidel. Monique is unaware that Fidel is watching her from his car. JB finds Celine in a good mood at the office the next day. Celine tells her secretary that she has no plans to attend any meetings before tomorrow's ManCom, when she will hand them the Romero account. Mang Simo advises Eli to shout out his feelings. Jackie wonders about the pendant's owner.
43	"09-2"	December 5, 2006
Celine rejects JB's apology and reminds him of his broken promises. Flashbacks show how Corazon opposed JB's interest in Celine and arranged for him to meet Jackie. Mang Simo assures Eli he'll take care of the neighbors. Jackie panics when she can't find Eli's pendant. Celine accuses Imelda of being insensitive. Mang Oca tells Eli to look for him in Manila. Celine gets to work. The neighbors believe Mang Simo's explanation for Jackie's absence. Eli lovingly cradles things that remind him of Jackie. Jackie hopes the pendant's owner appears at her party.
44	"09-3"	December 6, 2006
Fidel can't say no to Jackie. Celine ignores JB's call. Fidel warns JB not to hurt Jackie. Monique agrees to attend the party. JB chooses Celine. Kevin Romero meets Celine at her office. Monique tells Jackie that love will either make you whole or starve your soul. Celine does not resist when Kevin undresses her in the elevator. Eli overhears plans for another crime. Jackie asks Imelda to rent a Benz for Monique. Building security asks to see Corazon. Eli arms himself, but changes his mind at the last minute. Corazon shows Celine damaging video from the elevator.
45	"09-4"	December 7, 2006
JB walks out. Celine tells Corazon to drop the fake tears. Imelda assures Fidel that Monique will not attend the party. Imelda and Monique get into a catfight. Monique decides to not tell Jackie. Jackie leaves JB messages. JB goes drinking. Celine is drunk and dancing when Gio arrives. Eli reports a carnapping in progress. JB rushes Eli to the hospital when Eli is stabbed. Gio brings Celine home. Pong gets a call from JB. JB tells Pong he'll take care of the bills. JB tells Jackie that a man named Eli Davide helped him.
46	"09-5"	December 8, 2006
Jackie finds the name Eli familiar. Celine is too drunk to listen to Imelda. Corazon appoints a new Sales Head. JB tells Pong he and his girlfriend will visit. Pong realizes who JB is and hides in the bathroom. Jackie doesn't recognize the Davides. Eli is half-awake and calls Jackie 'Princess'. Siony's salon is closed by the police; Monique knows it's Fidel's doing. In jail, the carnappers vow revenge. Eli insists on leaving the hospital and gets a loan from Mang Oca. Eli refuses JB's money. Jackie asks Celine if anything happened between her and JB.

=== Week 10 ===
No.	Title	Original release date
47	"10-1"	December 11, 2006
Celine tells Jackie that her return ruined everything. Celine asks Imelda to take her away from it all. JB throws his phone into the pool. Gio tells Celine she should not waste her life on a man. Jackie is dismayed that JB lost Pong's number. JB realizes that Jackie is the one for him. Jackie insists on wearing Eli's pendant. Monique arrives at Jackie's party but says she can't stay. Fidel opens the party and Jackie thanks everyone. Corazon asks Fidel to dance, but they stop when Fidel sees Monique's face instead. Jackie tells JB she's no longer sure she loves him.
48	"10-2"	December 12, 2006
Corazon and Imelda trade insults. Fidel urges Jackie to marry JB. Celine tells Imelda she knew Jackie was alive. The Davides see Jackie's party on TV. Eli burns JB's business card, but fails to burn Jackie's photo. Over the next six months, Eli resumes his studies with Mang Oca's help; Fidel and Jackie seek treatment in the US; JB joins them; while Celine parties nonstop in Amsterdam. Back in Manila, Jackie is determined to start a business. Mang Oca is upset to learn that Eli's pendant is gone. Jackie searches for her mother and is shocked by what she finds.
49	"10-3"	December 13, 2006
JB fires one of the managers for stealing. Celine is with a support group at The Haven when Imelda and Jackie visit. Celine insists that she's better, but some bridges need to be burned. Fidel disapproves of Jackie's landscaping business. Eli bonds with a new friend, Kalay. JB brings his car to the shop where Eli works. Mang Oca watches as Eli and JB come face-to-face. Brian and his daughter visit Celine. Jackie sets up her office. Mang Oca secretly orders Eli's retrenchment. JB and Fidel are unhappy when Jackie is late for dinner. Dadoods suffers an attack.
50	"10-4"	December 14, 2006
Dadoods must remain in hospital. Fidel worries about JB and Jackie. Mang Oca advises Eli to seek JB's help. Eli asks JB for a job. Mang Oca remembers the night that baby Eli disappeared. Jackie meets a prospective client. JB worries about theft on his ships. JB visits Jackie; together, they visit Monique. Later he tells Jackie he can't stand adulterers. Jackie surprises Siony and Monique with a new salon. Brian is at a jeweller when JB arrives. Celine says she's not ready to leave The Haven because she longs for revenge. JB advises Brian to stay away from Celine.
51	"10-5"	December 15, 2006
JB is upset by memories of Celine. Work distracts Jackie when JB calls. Kalay finds Jackie's photo in Eli's closet. Jackie gets an urgent call from Monique. Brian gives Celine flowers and promises not to leave her. Jackie gives Monique medicine for Siony. JB tells Jackie she's changed; she tells him they can split up if he can't accept the new Jackie. Mamu G stops JB from drinking. Eli and Kalay argue. JB tells Jackie he'll do everything to keep them together. Eli's boss advises him to ignore theft at JB's warehouse. Jackie congratulates Celine on her graduation.

=== Week 11 ===
No.	Title	Original release date
52	"11-1"	December 18, 2006
Brian tells Celine he loves her. Dadoods worries about Eli. Eli overhears plans for a crime. Eli sees Jackie again for the first time. Jackie surprises JB with a packed lunch. Eli tells JB about the planned crime. Eli, JB, and the police catch the thieves red-handed. Celine's friends welcome her back. Celine gives thanks to Imelda and to Brian. JB transfers Dadoods to a better hospital. Eli is attacked on his way home; Mang Oca saves the day. Kalay teases Eli about his baby powder. Jackie follows her nose to JB's office and finds Eli.
53	"11-2"	December 19, 2006
Imelda asks Celine to be less anti-social. JB can't give Jackie irrigation advice. Eli overhears JB talking to Jackie. JB forbids Jackie from traveling alone. Jackie tells Fidel she wants Monique in her life. JB asks Eli to drive Jackie. Celine learns that a fighting fish must remain alone. Jackie stuns Eli by asking for tomatoes and eating with her hands. Jackie smells baby powder. Jackie and Eli are forced to spend the night at the artist's home. Brian rescues Celine and says people will have to go through him to hurt her. Fidel angrily warns JB to be more responsible.
54	"11-3"	December 20, 2006
Eli is attacked by a plant. A restless Celine leaves her house. JB and Jackie argue over the phone. Jackie shares her frustrations with Eli. Fidel leaves to pick up Jackie. Celine sees a homeless family looking for food. Eli is confused by what he feels. Celine finds joy in feeding the homeless family. Fidel and JB pick Jackie up. Celine feeds her fighting fish while Brian visits. Fidel orders Jackie to close her business. Celine volunteers at a women's shelter. Imelda spends the night in Celine's bedroom. Jackie notices JB's reaction to Celine at Imelda's wedding.
55	"11-4"	December 21, 2006
JB and Brian join the 'family' photo. Dadoods asks Eli if he still loves Jackie. JB and Celine are distracted; their respective partners notice. Eli assures Dadoods he no longer hopes for a relationship with Jackie. Guada shows up at Eli's house unannounced. Jackie learns that Mamu G. wants to talk to JB. Passion overwhelms JB and Celine. Eli learns Guada's plight. Jackie sees Celine running. Eli tells Guada the truth about Jackie. Brian asks Celine if she's okay. Jackie finds JB upset but misinterprets why. JB releases aggression in the boxing ring.
56	"11-5"	December 22, 2006
JB nurses bruised knuckles and tells himself to forget Celine. Shaken by the kiss, Celine runs back to The Haven, but realizes she can't hide there anymore. JB sends Engineer Eli to help Jackie with her irrigation problem. Kalay teases Eli about his boss's girlfriend. With JB's blessing, Eli agrees to work for Jackie. Mamu G. meets Eli and smiles. While at a picnic together, Brian tells Celine he loves her. Jackie plans a romantic date with JB at Baywalk, but JB keeps remembering Celine.

=== Week 12 ===
No.	Title	Original release date
57	"12-1"	December 25, 2006
JB kisses Jackie but she pushes him away. Celine breaks Brian's kiss and apologizes. Brian understands. JB and Jackie argue bitterly. Celine calls Imelda. JB is drunk when Jackie calls him. Eli helps Jackie find JB and bring him home. Eli is hurt when Jackie and JB exchange "I love you's". Flashbacks show how Jackie has always supported JB. Celine comforts a Haven graduate. Jackie and Eli share a funny moment. Celine listens to phone messages. Eli wonders if Jackie will ever remember their love. Celine slaps JB when he says their kiss meant nothing.
58	"12-2"	December 26, 2006
JB asks Mamu G. for advice. Fidel asks Jackie when she will marry JB. Jackie wonders what gift to get Monique. Celine makes a call. Eli agrees to do a favor for Jackie. Brian asks Celine if she loves him. Eli drives Jackie to Monique. Brian bids Celine goodbye. Corazon returns and is unhappy with JB's handling of business. Eli and Jackie serenade Monique for her birthday. Jackie thanks Eli with a hug. After several beers, a half-drunk Jackie asks Eli for a kiss. JB finds Eli leaning over Jackie and demands an explanation.
59	"12-3"	December 27, 2006
JB is angry that Jackie is drunk. Monique tells Eli she's always unlucky on her birthdays. Guada tells Eli there's no distance in love. Fidel tells Jackie he no longer knows her. JB reprimands Jackie for her behavior. Jackie weeps when Eli resigns. Jackie says she doesn't know whether or not to be true to herself. Jackie apologizes to Eli for her drunken behavior. Eli asks his mother to help him love another. Someone watches Fidel from a distance. Fidel picks up a prostitute. Celine calls Brian and thanks him. Jackie argues with JB about Monique.
60	"12-4"	December 28, 2006
Corazon compliments Jackie on her business sense. Imelda learns Celine hasn't returned Jackie's calls. Corazon urges JB to marry Jackie. Eli teases Pong about Guada. Eli goes to see Mang Oca. Mang Oca hides from Eli and vows vengeance. Fidel is disturbed when he sees Mang Oca. Fidel tells Jackie he won't rest until her memory returns. Eli brings Kalay to work and introduces her to Jackie. JB apologizes to Jackie and Monique. An upset Imelda drags Celine out to go drinking. Jackie insists on driving Eli and Kalay home.
61	"12-5"	December 29, 2006
Celine is trying to get a half-drunk Imelda home when JB walks in the bar and gets a few choice words from Imelda. Jackie tells Monique she wants her relationship with Celine to be fine again. Kalay notices the way Eli looks at Jackie. Eli gets flustered at work, and leaves without his cellphone. Back home, Eli asks Kalay to save him. Jackie arrives at Eli's house in time to see Kalay and Eli kiss.

=== Week 13 ===
No.	Title	Original release date
62	"13-1"	January 1, 2007
Jackie runs to her car and cries. Eli tells Kalay he wants to love again, but she tells him to think things through. Jackie worries about her feelings for Eli. Jackie is upset when Celine admits to seeing her when she was still presumed dead. Eli invites Kalay to dinner. Celine asks Jackie for a chance to talk. Guada is upset to see Eli with Kalay. Celine agrees to help Jackie find her lost past. At the provincial market, a woman tells the cousins they may find what they're looking for in a nearby barrio. Mang Simo sees Jackie at the market and starts shouting "Princess."
63	"13-2"	January 2, 2007
Mang Simo falls silent. Fidel learns that foul weather is coming. JB learns Mamu G. is missing. Jackie and Celine find an empty barrio. The storm breaks. Fidel asks Monique where Jackie might be. Eli finds Mamu G. and she seems to know him. Celine and Jackie bond. In Jackie's dream, JB becomes Eli. Eli feels he's being followed. Jackie meets Mang Simo but doesn't recognize him. Mang Simo hides the truth from Jackie. Pong gets a threatening SMS. Mang Simo gives Jackie good advice. Jackie comes home to find Fidel with Monique. Jackie tells Monique she's falling for Eli.
64	"13-3"	January 3, 2007
Mang Simo visits Eli in Manila with news. Pong says he's not ready to face the consequences should Jackie remember. Jackie insists that Celine should join her field trip the next day. Pong says Jackie is more likely to remember because Eli's always around her. Dadoods stops Pong and Eli from getting into a fistfight. Mang Oca sees Mang Simo in Eli's neighborhood and asks how he's doing. JB is surprised when Celine arrives at Jade Gardens on the morning of the trip. In the car, Celine jokes that she and Eli are a perfect match. At their destination, Celine and JB argue, and she slaps JB - twice.
65	"13-4"	January 4, 2007
JB asks Jackie why she brought Celine along. Kalay arrives at Eli's house, but Eli is at work. Celine fumes over JB's attitude. Eli and Celine look on as Jackie and JB stroll through the garden. JB and Jackie are distracted by Celine as she jokes with Eli. Dadoods thanks Kalay for being with Eli. JB and Jackie feel jealous over Celine and Eli. Dejected, Kalay walks home alone. Eli escapes to the garden when Jackie joins him and Celine. Jackie asks Eli why he's avoiding her. JB gets another slap from Celine when he calls her a slut. Celine learns that JB had been ready to choose her over Jackie.
66	"13-5"	January 5, 2007
JB tells Jackie they're leaving. Celine hides when Jackie visits. Eli realizes he forgot Kalay. JB vents to Mamu G about Corazon and the union. Jackie is pacifying a client when Kalay calls Eli. Eli leaves. Kalay tells Eli she's leaving because her mom is ill. Jackie's anger turns to guilt when she learns Kalay is gone. Eli learns Jackie plans to go back to the barrio. Striking workers call JB Corazon's puppet. At the barrio, Eli and Mang Simo watch Jackie from a distance. Eli says he's tired of pretending. JB arrives at Celine's house, grabs her, and kisses her. Celine resists at first, then starts kissing him back. They end up spending the night together.

=== Week 14 ===
No.	Title	Original release date
67	"14-1"	January 8, 2007
Jackie enters the empty kubo and feels happy. Monique rejects gifts from Fidel. Celine feels regret when she awakens next to JB. Jackie attacks the unknown man entering the kubo only to realize it's Eli. Fidel visits Monique and invites her to dinner. Eli asks Jackie why she would look for a lost love if she still intends to stay with JB. Fidel is displeased when Jackie arrives the next day with Eli. Fidel warns Eli to stay away. JB awakens to an empty house. Hours later, Celine comes home to find JB still waiting. He tells her he was stupid not to realize she's the only one in his heart.
68	"14-2"	January 9, 2007
Eli and Pong get into a fistfight. Corazon is surprised to see Monique at a fancy restaurant, only to be more surprised when Fidel arrives. JB tells Jackie he has news about Celine, but Jackie misunderstands; JB is at a loss as to how to end their relationship. Fidel pointedly asks Corazon to let him and Monique dine privately. Celine tries to convince Imelda -- and herself -- that Jackie will understand and forgive her. Corazon decides that no one can be happy if she is unhappy. Eli remembers moments with Pong. Eli tells Jackie he must leave his job at Jade Gardens.
69	"14-3"	January 10, 2007
Jackie excitedly asks Fidel if his relationship with Monique is now okay. Siony is excited for Monique. JB, Celine, and Jackie have dinner together, but Celine stops JB from telling Jackie the truth. Corazon sees JB and Celine together, but her usual tactics don't work with JB anymore. Flashbacks show how Corazon ended up marrying JB's father. Believing that no one loves her anymore, Corazon cuts her wrists. Someone pulls a gun on Eli and he barely escapes.
70	"14-4"	January 11, 2007
JB rushes Corazon to the hospital. Dadoods learns that someone tried to kill Eli. JB is guilt-stricken. Dadoods warns Eli's enemy to stay away. Eli convinces JB to leave work and return to the hospital. Eli is aloof with Jackie at the hospital. Fidel asks Monique to move back into the mansion. Corazon is bitter when she awakens. JB promises to do as Corazon asks. Corazon apologizes to Mamu G. and says everything will now be okay. At JB's birthday dinner, JB surprises everyone by proposing to Jackie. In pain and shock, Eli and Celine can only watch as Jackie answers yes.
71	"14-5"	January 12, 2007
Corazon tells JB she's proud of him for proposing to Jackie. Celine is crushed and returns to her old partying ways. Eli throws princess' ring into the water. Monique and Siony move into Fidel's home. Brian finds Celine at a club and takes her away. Eli asks Oca for a loan so he can repay his debt to JB and resign. As Eli tries to leave the office, Jackie demands an explanation. When Eli refuses to answer, Jackie asks if he's resigning because she is engaged to JB.

=== Week 15 ===
No.	Title	Original release date
72	"15-1"	January 15, 2007
Jackie chases Eli into the street. Eli avoids Jackie. Jackie says she wants to hear from Eli that he loves her, because she loves him. Jackie tries to find the necklace Eli gave her. Jackie and Eli spend the day together. Brian comforts Celine. Fidel tells Monique that they will have dinner with Corazon to prepare for the wedding. Corazon shouts at someone over the phone. Jackie returns her engagement ring to JB.
73	"15-2"	January 16, 2007
JB runs out of the office, shocked. Eli and Pong patch things up. Eli tells his family that he loves Jackie and is determined to make their relationship work. JB asks Imelda where Celine is. Celine thanks Brian for never giving up on her. JB asks Celine for forgiveness. Celine ignores JB's appeal. Brian and JB engage in a fistfight. Celine tells JB to stay away from her husband, Brian. JB drowns his sorrows in a bar. Celine and Brian tell Imelda about their civil wedding. Jackie goes to the dinner, and Corazon asks why she is not with JB.
74	"15-3"	January 17, 2007
Jackie tells Corazon, Fidel, and Monique that the wedding is off. Monique and Fidel confront each other about their past relationship. Jackie tells Monique that she loves Eli. Monique advises her to keep quiet for now. Corazon and JB get into a shouting match. JB is haunted by memories of hurting Celine. JB forces Jackie to push through with their marriage. JB warns Eli to stay away from Jackie. Dante asks Monique for help, while Corazon stalks in the background. A mysterious caller asks for Monique at the Madrigal house. JB sends Jackie flowers, but she sends them back.
75	"15-4"	January 18, 2007
Eli and Jackie promise only the best for each other. Monique gives money to Dante, not realizing she's being followed. JB forces Jackie to join him for dinner, but ends up threatening Jackie and Eli. Fidel sees photographs of Monique. Eli and Jackie plan to escape. Fidel kicks Monique out. Jackie tries to reason with Fidel, but Fidel shows her a videotape. Jackie and Fidel confront each other. Jackie is determined to fight. Eli urges his family to escape. JB bumps into Dante at the office. Bigboy and his gang, and Eli get into a brawl. Eli's family escapes. A mysterious man shoots Bigboy's gangmates. Jackie escapes to see Eli. JB and Fidel follow her and assault Eli, while Oca watches in the background.
76	"15-5"	January 19, 2007
Fidel scolds Jackie. A badly beaten Eli is brought to a field. Oca gets Eli. Heidi asks Monique for help. Monique storms to Fidel's house but gets sued for trespassing. Eli sends Jackie a message through Heidi. Celine learns that JB and Jackie's wedding will push through, but Imelda says other things are happening. Jackie fakes being ill and is sent to a hospital. Jackie asks Celine to help her. Celine talks to Eli and shows him the necklace.

=== Week 16 ===
No.	Title	Original release date
77	"16-1"	January 22, 2007
Eli and Jackie escape with Celine's help. Fidel orders a search for Jackie. Imelda and Celine visit Fidel at the Madrigal home. JB and Celine argue. Fidel tries to coerce information out of Monique but gets vilified instead. Eli and Jackie wait for Mang Oca at the barrio they stayed at when Jackie first had amnesia. Fidel's men trash Siony's salon. Celine admits to Brian that she helped Jackie escape and that she's happy seeing JB suffer. Eli and Jackie make love.
78	"16-2"	January 23, 2007
Jackie promises to love Eli regardless of his secrets. JB decides to listen to his mind over his heart. Fidel confides to Imelda his troubled past with women and vows that no one can re-enter his life or heart. Pong is identified in a television report. Eli and Jackie call Celine as she has lunch with Imelda and Fidel.
79	"16-3"	January 24, 2007
Celine ignores the call and convinces Fidel and Imelda that it was work. Eli leaves Jackie in the care of Mang Simo and Bebing as he searches for Oca. Brian asks JB to admit that he has lost. Fidel finds and attacks Dadoods and Pong when they refuse to talk. Eli finds Oca at his home, sitting by his daughter's casket. Oca reveals that he is behind the kidnap attempt on Jackie and that it is all a revenge plot against Fidel.
80	"16-4"	January 25, 2007
Flashbacks reveal Oca's past dealings with Fidel: Fidel had refused to pay Oca for job he did at a time Oca needs the money for his daughter's medical care. Pong asks Guada to watch over Dadoods in the hospital as he goes to the province to look for Eli. Jackie, while waiting for Eli, hits her head and regains all of her memories. Confronted, Eli tells her everything. Jackie, feeling angry and betrayed, tells Eli that she will keep the truth a secret to make them even, and leaves him despite his pleas that she stay.
81	"16-5"	January 26, 2007
Jackie goes to Brian and Celine's home. Imelda discovers Jackie sleeping upstairs and contacts Fidel. Eli goes to see Dadoods in the hospital. Jackie agrees to marry JB in exchange for Monique's release from prison. Eli tells Pong he is not afraid of Fidel and goes to confront him. Eli is stopped at the gate and ends up fighting JB.

=== Week 17 ===
No.	Title	Original release date
82	"17-1"	January 29, 2007
Eli is sent to jail after his fight with JB. Monique is at a loss as to how to help Jackie. Celine receives Jackie and JB's wedding invitation. Jackie accuses Celine of being jealous when Celine tries to talk her out of the marriage. Celine slaps Jackie and tells her that she no longer cares what she does. When asked about her involvement with Monique's ex, Corazon tells JB that she just wants to be happy. Dadoods, despite his worsening condition, tells Pong that he will wait for Eli. Celine bails Eli out of jail, but they arrive at the hospital too late; Dadoods has died.
83	"17-2"	January 30, 2007
Eli says goodbye to Dadoods. Fidel receives a phone call from the hospital saying that Jackie's driver is awake. The driver tells Fidel that it was a kidnapping not a car accident. Big Boy's men tell the police that Pong was their driver. Pong, Guada, and Eli bury Dadoods. Pong is arrested for kidnapping. Eli confronts Jackie and accuses her of contacting the police despite her promise that she wouldn't. In his rage, Eli wrecks the furniture at the family home and grabs a gun, before he sees his mother's picture on the floor and stops. Jackie pleads with Fidel not to prosecute Pong. Jackie promises JB anything he wants if he will help convince Fidel to leave Eli alone. JB says it's no longer in his hands and blames Jackie for everything that's happened.
84	"17-3"	January 31, 2007
Eli tries to find a lawyer for Pong. Monique goes to Fidel's home and confronts JB as he drives up. Jackie goes to the hospital and asks her driver to forget about the kidnapping, but he refuses. JB starts to consider postponing the photoshoot for the wedding. Fidel's lawyers inform him that they cannot find evidence with which to prosecute Eli. Jackie asks Celine to warn Eli about Fidel. Pong asks Eli to stop what he is doing before he gets put in jail. Eli ignores Jackie's warning and tells Celine to tell her to leave him alone. Later that night, Celine finds Eli's pendant.
85	"17-4"	February 1, 2007
Imelda panics when Celine tells her that the pendant belongs to Eli. Celine finally remembers seeing the pendant in a painting of the Roxas patriarch, and goes to see Corazon. Eli visits Fidel to plead for his brother's life and volunteers to pay his family's debt, but Fidel pushes him away and spits on him. Mang Oca tells Eli it's time he knows the truth about his lost past.
86	"17-5"	February 2, 2007
Eli asks Oca why he did not tell him the truth earlier. Oca explains that he had a daughter to take care of, but not anymore. Corazon visits Celine and asks to know about the pendant. Celine and Corazon visit Eli, only to be rejected. Celine tells Brian how good it feels to have payback. Brian confronts Celine and tries to leave her. Eli approaches Corazon and tells her that he wants to get things done.

=== Week 18 ===
No.	Title	Original release date
87	"18-1"	February 5, 2007
Eli takes a DNA test. Corazon gets the DNA test results and is shocked. Gloria tries to see the DNA test results, but Corazon stops her. Guada gets Mimay back. Guada's husband vows vengeance and decides to testify against Eli. At dinner, Fidel tells Corazon, JB, and Jackie that he now has evidence against Eli. JB tells Jackie that all this wouldn't be happening if Eli had not entered their lives. Corazon and Fidel argue about the case. Fidel remembers when they tried to abandon the baby. Fidel points a gun at Oca when the latter surprises him in his car.
88	"18-2"	February 6, 2007
Oca tells Fidel that a lot of people know the truth about Eli and his past. Fidel pulls the trigger but Oca had removed the bullets. Fidel tells his lawyers to drop the case against Eli. JB accuses Eli of manipulating Fidel. Corazon tells JB to leave Eli alone because he is his flesh and blood. Corazon and JB introduce Eli to his mother, Mamu G. Mamu G. breaks out of her depressed state and weeps as she embraces her long lost son. Corazon attempts to reconcile with Mamu G but gets a slap for her trouble. Eli tells Mamu G. that they had planned to kill him as a baby.
89	"18-3"	February 7, 2007
Gloria gets a check-up as Corazon, JB, and Eli look on. Fidel tells Jackie he decided not to prosecute Eli to prove he's not as cold-hearted as she thinks. Gloria finds the birth certificate of baby Gabriel. A flashback reveals how Gloria learned years ago that Corazon was involved in baby Gabriel's disappearance. Gloria rebuffs Corazon's attempts to talk and instead tells her sister she plans to move out. Fidel reminds Corazon of how madly in love he used to be with Gloria, and admits that he planned to kill Gabriel in retaliation for being rejected. Fidel tries to manipulate Corazon into helping him keep Eli and Gloria quiet. Eli plans to return home to see Guada. JB tries to bribe Eli into disappearing.
90	"18-4"	February 8, 2007
Gloria tells JB that she will leave the house. Gloria tells Eli that she is not ready to face Corazon in court. Oca advises Eli to act fast if he wants payback. Jackie remembers how Eli pleaded with Fidel. Gloria visits the company, reminds everyone of her controlling interest, then demands that Eli be given a position. Eli tells Corazon he wants JB's job. JB and Corazon fight over Eli's demand. Eli gets JB's position. Jackie and JB fight over dinner. JB angrily tells Jackie that Eli is the lost son of Gloria.
91	"18-5"	February 9, 2007
Gloria informs JB of her intentions to move out. Eli begins his job at the company. Corazon shows frustration with Fidel over the whole Eli situation. Gloria and Eli visit Dadoods and his Nanay's gravesite. Eli asks about his father but Gloria refuses to talk about him. Gloria buys Eli a new home and car. Eli asks Oca about his father but Oca doesn't say anything. JB visits Gloria at the home. Eli goes upstairs as he and JB can't stand to be in the same room. Gloria tries to persuade both cousins to make amends. Eli visits Celine at her home as Jackie enters the room.

=== Week 19 ===
No.	Title	Original release date
92	"19-1"	February 12, 2007
Jackie was surprised to see Eli at Celine’s. Eli volunteers to leave but Jackie was quick to her feet and goes out the door first. Celine asks them if they can be at least civil with one another. However, Eli tells her that it’s Jackie who distanced herself from him. Celine gets distracted again by her cousin’s problems and somehow Brian blames himself for restricting his wife from meddling with Jackie’s affairs. Monique has been drinking herself into a stupor nightly and Siony has had enough. He tells his friend to fight back. They find a way to see Jackie by conniving with the designer of her wedding gown, who turns out to be a friend of Siony’s. Monique scolds Jackie for allowing herself to be trapped in that situation with JB. She explains to her mom though that she has to sacrifice her happiness for every one’s welfare. JB and Eli have their share of run-ins in the office. JB’s ego was too big to have him admit defeat to his cousin. He thinks of a plan to make Eli jealous by ordering Jackie to visit him at the office. Jackie, clueless of the current situation at RSL barges in on Eli, thinking the room was still JB’s office. Jackie furiously stormed JB in his new office, placing her in such an embarrassing situation. While they fought, the two were oblivious to Eli’s presence at the doorway. He then announces that he doesn’t care if the couple gets married or not. He also tells them to shut the door if they want privacy during personal discussions.
93	"19-2"	February 13, 2007
Jackie, who is betrothed to JB, is beset by her need to fulfill the family’s wishes, and her feelings for Eli. But he overhears them talking, and tells the two that he does not care for the two’s sentiments. Jackie confides in Celine that she can’t take it anymore, and that her attempts to keep the family together are tearing her apart inside. Meanwhile, Oca also advises Eli to steady himself; lest he compromises those he loves the most. A fuming Monique rushes to Corazon, and demands an answer to why Jackie is set to marry JB. A fight between Corazon and Monique breaks out, and would probably continue if not for Siony’s interference. Later, Corazon confides in Fidel, and the latter quickly warns Monique that it would be best not to meddle in his affairs. At work, Eli asks Corazon about his true father, and she replies that all she knows is that life would be a lot better for everyone without him. While Fidel was overseeing a charity event, Oca suddenly calls him and warns that in a few moments, something grave would happen; and Fidel suddenly sees a laser target on Jackie’s head. At the same time, Eli enters his car, when suddenly an intruder from the back seat pulls a gun to his head.
94	"19-3"	February 14, 2007
Fidel surrenders to Oca and aborts his plans to have Eli killed. He has Jackie’s security tightened. But Jackie’s not touched by her father’s actions. Monique’s absence during her gown fitting was another blow for Jackie. She finds out from her Yaya Heidi that Siony and her mom has closed shop and are nowhere to be found. Celine tries to console Jackie. Fidel overhears their conversation. He gets a worried look upon hearing Jackie say she’s breathing yet she feels like she has already died. Eli plans to counter Fidel. Gloria’s wary but he tells her that it’s not only his revenge but their family’s too. She also provides security measures on Eli. Gloria then gives Fidel another warning. She then marches off to her sister and gives Corazon the same advice she gave th rich man. This prompts Corazon to give her 'cohort' a call. She tells him to stop his antics for he does not know what Gloria is capable of. Gloria’s shocks Corazon when she says that she wants all her RSL shares transferred to Eli’s name.
95	"19-4"	February 15, 2007
Corazon is at her wits end with Gloria's demand. Her lawyers seconded her sister's words, saying Gloria’s moves are all legal and there is nothing she can do about it. JB also wants his mother to give in to his aunt's wishes. Corazon then remembers the time Gloria was willing to give everything up for the sake of her freedom. She then shakily signs Gloria’s contract. JB still is annoyed at Eli, blowing his top during a stockholders' meeting, when his cousin started questioning his report. Embarrassed by her son’s actions, Corazon reprimands him, telling him to clean up his act. Oca pats Eli on the back for his superb ‘acting’. JB retaliates and brings Jackie to meet Gloria. Eli was a bit taken aback, but acts nonchalant towards the two. JB asks Jackie to send Eli and Mamu G their invitation to the wedding. Eli gives his cousin dagger looks and excuses himself from the table. Eli then bumps into Jackie, who just came from the restroom. They get into an argument and Eli states that Jackie’s marrying for the money. The young woman gives him a resounding slap and storms off. Eli visits Dadoods and Eloisa’s grave and apologizes to them for what he has become. After that he drops by RSL to give Corazon his resignation. He demands that she buy his shares in the company or else he pulls them out.
96	"19-5"	February 16, 2007
Eli decides to file his resignation from RSL and along with it, a monetary equivalent of all his shares in the company. Enraged, Corazon says she wouldn't agree to Eli's demands and remains stubborn. As she hurls expletives at her nephew, Eli says that he will reveal all of Corazon's secrets, if she wants to fight him head on. Despite everything, he says that they are still family, whether they like it or not. On his way out, JB blocks Eli's way, and insults at him as well. Eli retaliates by bluntly informing him of his resignation. A shocked JB then storms to his mother's office, telling her to give in to Eli's demands, as he will work harder to keep their company from falling apart. He adds that his marriage with Jackie will further their financial assets, which Eli overhears. Corazon storms to Gloria's house, angrily informing her sister of Eli's actions. Gloria defends her son's decision, and says that Corazon shouldn't accuse him of such things. However, Gloria talks to her son that night, and learns that he is indeed hell-bent on seeking revenge for Fidel's maltreatment of his family. Gloria reminds him that it is not right to be bitter, although it seems like her advice has fallen on deaf ears. In the Madrigal household, Fidel tries to woo his daughter for dinner, which she readily declines. Sullen, she tells him she'd rather sketch than eat or accompany him to dinner, a subtle signal for him to leave her room. Alone, Fidel is left to wonder what had happened between him and his beloved daughter, and if ever their relationship will be back to normal again.

=== Week 20 ===
No.	Title	Original release date
97	"20-1"	February 19, 2007
JB arranges a rehearsal for his upcoming wedding, something Jackie isn't looking forward to. Celine arrives together with Brian, the couple kidding around, looking happy in each other's arms. JB gets uncomfortable around Brian, and the atmosphere gets more uneasy when Celine is called to rehearse, leaving Jackie, Brian and JB alone. Soon the couple leaves, and the soon-to-be bride and groom escort them to the entrance of the church. Jackie gets wistful, and remarks that Celine and Brian look so happy together. JB responds with an assurance that they will also end up happy in the future, something Jackie is unsure of. Monique catches herself thinking of Jackie once again, and vows never to give up, as she will come back for Jackie one day. Jackie and Celine go to their favorite ice cream parlor. Celine remarks that Fidel has grown lenient on Jackie, theorizing that the previous attack on Jackie's life has something to do with it. JB looks for Jackie, irritated that he doesn't know her whereabouts. He calls her home, and is informed that Jackie's currently hanging out with Celine in the ice cream parlor they always go to. With a twist of fate, Mimay and Guada go to the same ice cream parlor. Jackie notices them, elated, and introduces them to Celine. It turns out they're with Eli, who appears shortly after. An uneasy pause follows, which Eli breaks by talking to Celine, and making it clear that he wishes to talk to her only. Celine asks him to join them, which he obligingly does. JB arrives at the scene, and Jackie excuses herself immediately. With Jackie gone, Celine asks Eli if he still has feelings for his cousin. Eli, now filled with hatred for Fidel, says he has extinguished every attachment he has for Jackie, as he cannot forgive everything that her father has done to him and his family. Meanwhile, Jackie and JB arrive at the Madrigal home, and both erupt in a heated argument. JB demands to know all of Jackie's whereabouts, and prohibits her to see Celine again, as he deems her cousin is secretly setting her up with Eli. Hurt, Jackie fights back but in the end, JB leaves her in tears.
98	"20-2"	February 20, 2007
JB orders Jackie not to meet with Celine anymore, as he deems she is a bad influence for Jackie. He then demands Jackie to look him straight in the eye, and tell him she's not in love with Eli anymore. Jackie responds with an angry stare, and tells him that she doesn't have feelings for Eli anymore. JB then storms out of Jackie's house, leaving her sobbing on the couch. Fidel stands unnoticed, witnessing JB maltreat his daughter. He retreats to his room, and reminisces good and bad memories of him and his daughter, and through it all, says that he loves his daughter very much. Meanwhile, Jackie quarantines herself in her room, and refuses to speak to anybody, even Celine, who senses it is all JB's fault. JB also secludes himself in his room, and wonders aloud how he'll make his relationship with Jackie work. He then relays his admiration to his father. JB then proceeds to go downstairs, and chances upon his mother. Corazon notices that something has gone amiss, and when JB tells her he had a fight with Fidel's daughter, Corazon orders JB to make his relationship with Jackie work. After all, their marriage is the only financial hope they have left, as Corazon has decided to finally give in to Eli's demands. Fidel tries once again to reach out to his daughter, and brings her breakfast the following day. Jackie snaps at him, and demands the reason for his sudden change of attitude. What could have been a heated argument turned into a sentimental moment for both father and daughter, as Fidel says that he only wants his daughter to be happy, even if he does not know how. Jackie responds with a surprised "thank you", much to the happiness of her father. The deal is finally sealed, and Eli goes to a bank to encash his shares in RSL. Before leaving, he talks with Oca, whom Gloria sees. She then warns her son to be careful, and says that there's something about Oca that prohibits her to trust him completely. At the bank, Eli encounters problems due to the large amount of money he wants to get. In the end, he is sent to Fidel, who happens to own the bank Eli is having problems with. Face to face, the two seem to gird their loins for battle. Threats were exchanged, and eventually Eli says he's going to bring Fidel down, as retribution for his foster father's demise, and the countless tragedies that Fidel has brought upon to his family. Upon making his point, Eli retreats, leaving a stunned Fidel, in the office.
99	"20-3"	February 21, 2007
Eli threatens to destroy Fidel's empire, leaving the banking magnate feel that it is something that should not be taken lightly. People of the bank throw into chaos, afraid that a stain in the bank's reputation will make their clients withdraw their investments. Fidel remains resolute that he will not beg for Eli's forgiveness, and vows not to let someone like Eli to destroy the company he worked so hard for. Unfortunately, Fidel is not the only one whose experiencing business problems. During his presentation, JB gets bombarded with questions and nagging doubts regarding their company's stability. Eli's pull-out sure brought quite a huge loss to their company, making the employees doubt their future with RSL. As such, JB asks for a consultation, and he's now faced with a hard decision to lay-off employees to keep the company alive. Monique stands at a distance, eagerly waiting for her daughter to appear at the parlor she frequents. She recognizes her father's efforts to reach out to her, and decides to fix her relationship with him as well. Fidel lets Jackie know how much he loves her, and even says that he's looking forward to fixing his relationship with Monique as well. Jackie says that they are going to be a picture-perfect family again, amidst her father's joyous tears.
100	"20-4"	February 22, 2007
Eli withdraws his money from Fidel's bank but the bank does not have enough funds to encash Eli's stocks. Fidel's other clients got wind of the news too, and are thinking of pulling out their money from the bank as well. He then orders his people for some damage control, and to assure their clients that the bank is more than stable, so there's no need to worry about anything. Celine asks her mother for advice, as she still ponders her mixed feelings for Brian. However, she relays that she can not help but feel guilty, as she feels that she's still not in love with him. Her mother tells her that it will be prudent to get rid of all her guilt, as she knows Brian is fully aware of Celine's feelings for JB, and for him. JB experiences some work jitters, as he was faced with the difficult choice to fire a lot of his employees. People rally against RSL. Fidel also reaches out to his contacts for some help, as his bank is in need of financial assistance. Unfortunately, his countless business meetings did not turn out the way he planned. One of his contacts turns out to be Gloria, Eli's biological mother. However, he pays her a house call not because he wants to explain his side of the story. Despite his confession of love to Gloria, and the pain he experienced because she chose another man, Gloria intercedes for her son's behalf, and eventually gets tired of Eli and Fidel's rollercoaster ride of bitterness and vengeance.
101	"20-5"	February 23, 2007
Eli ushers in Mang Simo and Aling Bebeng in his new house, and introduces them to his mother. Gloria adds that they shouldn't feel awkward around them, and thanks them for taking good care of her son. Mimay accidentally brings up a fond memory of her "ate Princess", Eli's star-crossed lover, Jackie. Gloria felt uncomfortable, because of Fidel and Eli's constant bickering. Gloria confronts her son, and again tells him to stop craving for revenge, as it won't bring him any good. Eli sticks to his own convictions, despite his mother's pleas. As Fidel's business problems continue to escalate, he gives his daughter a heart to heart talk about living one's own life, and came to the conclusion that he wants his daughter to be free and take the reins of her own life, even if that equates breaking off her marriage with JB. A surprised Jackie asks why, and Fidel replies by saying that he only wants happiness for his daughter. He apologizes for being the source of Jackie's misery, and wishes only happiness for his unica hija.

=== Week 21 ===
No.	Title	Original release date
102	"21-1"	February 26, 2007
Fidel gives Jackie the choice whether or not to marry JB. Bebeng and Guada remember the happy times of Eli and Princess. JB and Corazon worry about their financial problems. JB and Jackie are supposed to meet on a date, but Jackie rushes to Fidel's office when she sees a newspaper article. Fidel reiterates to Jackie that he is not forcing her to marry JB. Jackie tells Fidel that she will try her best to be a good wife to JB.
103	"21-2"	February 27, 2007
JB visits Jackie and assures her that everything will be alright. Siony and Monique hear news on the collapse of Fidel's bank. Jackie visits Celine. Siony tries to contact Heidi but is spotted by Fidel. JB gives a gift to Gloria and meets Eli. Eli and JB square off. Fidel apologizes to Monique but is rejected by her. Celine and Jackie visit Eli. Jackie confronts Eli. Eli threatens Jackie that he will not push through with the withdrawal if Jackie marries him. Jackie refuses. Monique tells Siony that she will not believe Fidel. Eli tells Gloria his experience with Jackie. Gloria tells Eli to let go.
104	"21-3"	February 28, 2007
Gloria tells Eli to let go. Gloria remembers Eli's father's promise to return. Fidel tells Jackie that she can see Monique. Jackie wakes up on her wedding day. JB tells himself that there is no turning back. EVeryone prepares for the wedding. Heidi tells Miriam that she pities Jackie. Jackie's car turns around the curb. Miriam informs Fidel of what's happening. JB storms to fins Jackie. JB chases the bridal car but loses it as it turns around. JB searches some more and finds an empty bridal car. Jackie calls Fidel and says she's sorry. Fidel tells Corazon that Jackie cannot marry JB. Corazon goes ballistic. Celine calls Jackie, but to no avail. Jackie marries Eli in a civil wedding ceremony.
105	"21-4"	March 1, 2007
Eli kisses Jackie on the cheek. Fidel tells Imelda that he is thankful that Jackie made her own decision not to attend the wedding. JB goes ballistic. Corazon tells JB nothing is wrong with him. Oca tells Eli not to mess up with his revenge on Fidel. Eli remembers all the suffering he went through. Eli and Jackie argue. Gloria tells Simo that she is worried about Eli. JB gets mad in a meeting. Eli tells Jackie to act properly. Jackie tells Fidel that she married Eli.
106	"21-5"	March 2, 2007
Brian tells Celine that Jackie will call at the right time. Fidel asks Monique for help to talk to Jackie. Gloria confronts Eli. Gloria tells Eli that because of his actions, the Roxas family will not be complete. JB storms Eli. A fight ensues between JB and Eli, and Corazon and Gloria. Gloria blames Jackie for what is happening. Simo asks Eli where his old self is. Eli says that that old self is gone. Simo tells him that he wishes that what he is doing is not revenge. Bebeng consoles Jackie. Oca sees the emotions of Jackie and Eli.

=== Week 22 ===
No.	Title	Original release date
107	"22-1"	March 5, 2007
Eli ignores Jackie in bed. Celine visits Jackie and Eli. Celine notices Jackies coldness towards Eli. Celine and Brian find JB in a bar. Corazon scolds JB. JB goes drinking again and remembers bad times with Eli. Monique tries to visit Jackie, but only sees Eli. JB storms Eli and points a gun at him. JB shoots Eli at the shoulders. Eli is taken to the hospital. JB is taken to jail. Oca threatens JB that he will rot in jail once Eli files a case against him.
108	"22-2"	March 6, 2007
Eli says that he will not file a case against JB. Corazon bails out JB. Jackie tries to talk to Corazon but slaps her. Eli tells Oca that he will not file a case against JB. Monique visits Jackie. JB visits Eli. JB says sorry to Celine. JB asks for forgiveness from Gloria. Gloria forgives JB. Celine finds her old scrapbook and remembers the memories. Celine burns the scrapbook. JB asks Jackie for closure. Jackie tells JB that this is the end. Pong gets a beating in jail. A police officer informs Oca that the beating is complete.
109	"22-3"	March 7, 2007
Eli sees Pong beaten up. Oca influences Eli that Fidel is behind Pong's injury. Oca calls Fidel and taunts him. Fidel gets beaten up by Eli. Fidel begs Eli to give back Jackie. Eli ignores Fidel's plea. Fidel and Jackie fight with each other because of Jackie's defense to Fidel. Pong has a traumatic breakdown. JB goes happily to work. Jackie and Eli argue after dinner. Oca influences Eli again about Fidel. Eli calls his lawyer to file a statement against PDBC. Jackie tries to see Fidel but is stopped by Eli. Fidel tries to see Oca. Oca pays back on Fidel. Fidel gets injured by falling down a flight of stairs.
110	"22-4"	March 8, 2007
Fidel is rushed to the hospital. Imelda tells Jackie to talk to Eli. Fidel gets taken care by Monique. Jackie and Eli argue over Fidel. Jackie's plea to Eli gets ignored. In a dream, Diosdado gives Eli a sign. Corazon goes to Fidel and tells him that he deserves his injury. Fidel asks for forgiveness from Corazon but is ignored. Fidel is brought home. Fidel asks for forgiveness from Monique. Gloria visits Fidel. Fidel says to Gloria that he regrets everything. Fidel thanks Monique for taking care of him. Gloria asks Eli to stop. Eli allows Jackie to see Fidel.
111	"22-5"	March 9, 2007
Jackie says farewell to Monique and Fidel. Jackie thanks Eli, but Eli says that what he is doing is for himself. Gloria thanks Eli, but Eli says that he is not happy. Gloria asks Jackie to make Eli happy. Jackie cooks breakfast, only to know that Eli is not in the house. Jackie visits Pong. Jackie and Pong apologize to each other.

=== Week 23 ===
No.	Title	Original release date
112	"23-1"	March 12, 2007
JB gives a pep talk to the company board. Celine and Brian go biking. Celine calls up Jackie. JB and Corazon receive news that the ship MV Princess of the Stars has sunk. Celine gives Brian a surprise birthday dinner. Oca visits Eli's home. Oca threatens and hurts Jackie. Eli shouts at Oca and warns him not to touch Jackie. Oca wishes Eli that their paths never cross again. Eli and Jackie argue over Oca's behavior. Celine is revealed to take birth control pills. Jackie receives a call from Monique on Fidel's warning about Oca.
113	"23-2"	March 13, 2007
Jackie finally talks to her mother after a long time, and during the conversation, Jackie discovers that Fidel repeatedly says to a name to himself: Oca. Meanwhile, news of RSL's disaster has spread nationwide, alarming Celine and Gloria respectively. As Celine's mother admonishes her daughter about her feelings towards JB and Brian, Gloria relays to Eli the trouble RSL is currently facing, and decide to help them out, even going as far as investing in the company again. However, Corazon won't accept their help, and decides to pursue with the mass layoff to keep the company afloat, despite JB's promise to the union that they won't. A heartbroken Jackie runs to Celine for refuge, as Eli shuns her more and more each day. In fact, she even considers separating from Eli, who even went as far as offending Mang Simo himself. As Celine and Brian give her tidbits of love lessons, she receives a text message from Eli, ordering her to go back home immediately.
114	"23-3"	March 14, 2007
Jackie decides to be stronger, and plays the role of a dutiful wife to Eli. Although obviously hurt, Eli tries to offend Jackie in any way he can, but it seems that the joke's on him, as Jackie really tries to make an effort to be the obedient wife he wants her to be, even going as far as waking up early in the morning to prepare the breakfast and everything he will need for work. RSL faces a four month's freeze, due to an investigation of all their ships, while members of the deceased crew ask for compensation from JB. A stressed Corazon faces them instead, and hurls insults at them, only making the gap between the company and the union worse. Later, she tells JB that she feels like the entire world's against them, but she's determined to rise through it all, and show Corazon and Eli that she can survive without their help. As the gap between the Roxas sisters widen, a stalker watches closely from a distance, preparing for his ultimate act of vengeance against the ally he had lost.
115	"23-4"	March 15, 2007
Jackie still tries to be the best wife for Eli, while he on the other hand, meets up with an associate for a business meeting. Also, Celine feels glad for her cousin, as she thinks that things are fine between Jackie and Eli. Later that night, Brian tells Celine that JB needs a friend right now with all the turmoil within RSL, so he won't prohibit Celine from going there and lending JB a hand. JB needs a shoulder to cry on, and runs to his Mamu G for moral support. She offers him a small amount as a token of help, and assures him that he's in no way a failure. Jackie runs into him uncomfortable at home, and both avoid each other awkwardly. Celine decides to do something about JB's current situation and tells Brian that she'll meet up with JB the following day. She then tells JB that she still cares for him, and will always do so. JB replies that no matter what he'll do, he can never redeem himself to her. Celine tells him that she's grateful that he became part of her life, and for making her for what she is now, getting her closure.
116	"23-5"	March 16, 2007
Things seems bleak for Jackie and Eli, as he continue to spurn his new wife. Jackie is surprised when Gloria reaches out to her, and asks to go out. JB also reminisces his moments with his dad, who told him to be strong just like his mother. At his business meeting, Eli says that he wants to open up a business that will cater to the masses, so that he can provide his services to the poor. A desperate Corazon on the other hand, meets up with her contacts for some financial help. At home, Eli talks to his mother about his dad, whom Gloria fondly recalls is good at playing the piano. He then tells her that he can't go on his life pretending everything is over, for the hurt and pain still remain deeply etched in his heart.

=== Week 24 ===
No.	Title	Original release date
117	"24-1"	March 19, 2007
Corazon borrows money from a man named Tomas Arroyo. JB and Corazon pay the families affected by the accident. After an investors meeting, JB reports to Corazon that they will be forced to sell the company. Celine invite Jackie to an outing, Jackie accepts the invitation. Eli scolds Jackie for accepting the invitation without his permission. The next day, Jackie joins Brian and Celine, but is surprised that Eli will come along.
118	"24-2"	March 20, 2007
Celine, Brian, Eli and Jackie go to the outing. Celine and Brian enjoy themselves, but Eli and Jackie are cold to each other. Bebeng, Simo, and Guada talk about Eli and Celine's relationship. Gloria is informed about Eli and Jackie's outing, but is being stalked by Oca. Eli remembers when Jackie first recovered her memories. Jackie remembers the promise made by Eli, that he will stick to her until the end.
119	"24-3"	March 21, 2007
Eli starts packing, and Jackie wakes up. Celine and Brian go out for a picnic. While Eli was sleeping, Jackie finally got Eli's cellphone out of his hands. She reads the text message from Yvette. The message said to meet her at a restaurant. Jackie gives Eli much food for breakfast on his plate, so he would be full and not be able to go out with Yvette. Jackie and Guada watch Eli walk into the restaurant he was supposed to have his meeting with Yvette. Jackie and Guada also watch Yvette get out of a cab a few minutes after Eli came.
120	"24-4"	March 22, 2007
RSL gets sold. Corazon visits Gloria, and tells her that RSL's demise marks the end of their sisterly bond, much to Gloria's sorrow. Meanwhile, Jackie trails behind Eli to check out Yvette Ramos, the girl he's constantly talking to on the phone. Unfortunately, Eli meets up with an older woman first, whom Jackie thinks is the real Yvette. So she goes home, happy and relieved, feeling stupid for trailing her husband like an overly paranoid wife. In bed, Jackie pours her heart to a sleeping Eli, as she reveals that she still loves him very much. The morning after, Jackie fixes Eli's breakfast in bed, and much to her surprise, the cold-hearted Eli greets her a good morning. Feeling guilty about his mother's current state with Corazon, Eli meets up with JB, and offers him financial assistance. However, JB refuses and tells him that he wants to get back on his own two feet, without getting help from Eli and his Mamu G. Meanwhile, Corazon receives a call from Tomas, the person she pawned her house to. He informs her that although he sympathizes with them, a business deal is a business deal, so he has no choice but to take over Corazon's house in one week if she doesn't pay off her loan.
121	"24-5"	March 23, 2007
Corazon has no choice but to sell her house to Tomas, and move into a condo unit with JB. JB tells her that he didn't get the job. Corazon and JB still try to be strong for each other, and keep their heads up despite the odds that are against them. Aling Bebeng, just like her husband, takes a blow from Eli, when she tried to settle a date for him and Jackie, and tells Mang Simo that she misses the simple life in the province. Jackie fixes up a treat for Eli and Gloria, when Yvette pays Eli an unexpected visit. The jealous Jackie finally confronts her, lets her know that she is Eli's wife, and that she will not let someone like Yvette ruin their marriage. Eli and Jackie erupt into a heated fight afterwards. Soon, Jackie tells Eli to just fire a shot to her head to finish things off, so that both of them will finally be happy.

=== Week 25 ===
No.	Title	Original release date
122	"25-1"	March 26, 2007
Eli and Jackie confronts each other in an argument, with a hurt Jackie telling Eli to just kill her, to end both their misery. Unknown to them, Gloria is in the background, and heard everything they fought about, including the true nature of their marriage. As such, she talks to her son, and informs him that Mang Simo and Aling Bebeng are now gone. She then proceeds to treat Jackie like a princess. On the other hand, Corazon bids farewell to her house, and all her furniture. Jackie then proceeds to sleep in a different room, away from Eli, who in turn, pours out his feelings to a picture of his family, and tells Dadoods that all he ever wanted was to marry the woman he really loves. Meanwhile, Eli visits Pong, and tells him that he will be leaving for a while to get his life in order.
123	"24-2"	March 27, 2007
JB and Corazon settle in their new home, and both mother and son try to make ends meet. JB gets a new job. However, things go from bad to worse in Gloria's household, as Eli decides to leave. Jackie pours out her feelings to Celine in a nearby restaurant, where Oca awaits. He then threatens Eli, even if various policemen are roving the area. Brian then contacts Eli as they deduce the two are together. Soon their husbands arrive at the scene, and quickly dragged them in the car, to avoid Oca. Jackie and Eli argue with each other in the car, but soon they stop dead in their tracks as Brian informs of them of a car that's been tailgating them ever since they left the restaurant! Soon, their car falls into a cliff, leaving the four all bloody and unconscious.
124	"25-3"	March 28, 2007
Eli, Jackie, Celine, and Bryan were in a car crash because of Oca. Everyone was rushed in the emergency room. While they were being taken care of, Oca committed suicide. On that night Celine's husband, Bryan, was dead. Only Celine found that out the next morning. It was sooner or later that Celine found out that she was a month pregnant. But because of Bryan's protection during the crash, the baby was saved. After JB saw what happened in the news, he went straight to the hospital. He visited Eli's mother, and cried in front of Celine's door. He wept in tears after he said that she will be alright, she has to be alright. They recovered thankfully and was out of the hospital the very next day.
125	"25-4"	March 29, 2007
Imelda tells Celine to let it all out. Celine remembers the time she spent with Brian. Jackie tries to call Celine, but is ignored. Bebeng comforts Jackie. JB visits Brian's grave, confessing that Brian was the best friend he's ever had and that he misses the time they spent together. He also confides to Brian that he's stupid for not seeing for himself what he saw in Celine. Celine sees JB visiting Brian's grave. She cries and asks Brian why he had to leave. Jackie asks Eli what Oca's role in the accident was. Eli tells Jackie that Oca is dead, and now there is nobody to blame. Eli says that he wants to separate from Jackie.
126	"25-5"	March 30, 2007
Eli and Jackie argue over separation, but Jackie refuses. Jackie confides in Bebeng, saying that she hopes that the old Eli will return. JB discreetly eats his own food at work. Corazon and her friend win in a casino game. Eli and Simo talk. Eli requests Guada to tell Jackie to sleep with him. Celine remembers Brian. JB visits Celine. Celine avoids JB. Jackie tucks Eli in bed. Jackie sleeps beside Eli.

=== Week 26 ===
No.	Title	Original release date
127	"26-1"	April 2, 2007
JB works at home. Corazon wishes that they were rich again. Corazon gives money to JB to pay their utilities. Jackie visits Celine. Celine blames everything to Jackie even though she didn't do anything. Celine forgives Jackie. Corazon meets Tomas in the Casino. Celine forgives Eli. Corazon witnesses Tomas play the piano. Eli's agent gives him a list of names of his possible father.
128	"26-2"	April 3, 2007
JB meets his godmother at a coffee shop. JB's godmother says that she left Corazon in the casino. JB interrogates Corazon as she gets home. JB visit Marsha and Celine. JB says to Celine that he will be there for her. Simo and Eli go to the hospital. Eli bumps into Tomas. Jackie cooks dinner. At bedtime, Jackie wishes the old Eli will come back.
129	"26-3"	April 4, 2007
Corazon loses at the casino. Celine works for sponsorships. Celine talks to her unborn baby. Celine receives an SMS message from JB. Corazon complain about dinner. Corazon asks JB for extra cash, but JB refuses. Corazon sells the condo. JB and Corazon argue, and he walks out. JB receives an SMS message from Celine. Corazon promises JB that she'll get the money back. Gloria overhears Eli and his agent's conversation. Gloria tells Eli not to ask about his father.

=== Week 27 ===
No.	Title	Original release date
130	"27-1"	April 9, 2007
JB and Corazon finally move out of their condo unit due to Corazon's frequent gambling. They settle in a middle-class neighborhood, something Corazon can barely stand. Yearning for her former lifestyle, Corazon thinks of working abroad, but lacks a social network for that to happen. She refuses to find work locally as she doesn't want to be bothered by people gossiping about her downfall. Her friend Lilian then says that her only option is Tomas, who is rich. She goes on a date with him one day. Unfortunately, she spots JB leading Celine out of a restaurant, and thinks that Celine is still in love with JB, when they only happened to meet coincidentally. She goes to Celine's house to berate and shame her, going as far as insulting Celine's relationship with Brian. An angry Celine counters that JB's life wouldn't be the way it is if not for his mother, and the two end up in a physical altercation. Unfortunately, Corazon pushes Celine to the floor, causing her to miscarry her child.
131	"27-2"	April 10, 2007
Celine loses her unborn child because of Corazon, and Imelda storms off to Corazon's house to avenge her daughter. Unfortunately, Corazon wasn't around, so she ends up slapping JB, for the child that Celine lost. A shocked JB then confronts Corazon, and his mother confesses the truth behind Eli's disappearance: She was the one who had him thrown away as a baby. She adds that if she could turn back time, she would have had Eli killed, to prevent him ruining their lives as well as RSL's downfall. A disillusioned JB calls her selfish, unable to love anybody else but herself, and that he's ashamed that she is his mother. With that, he storms out of the house, leaving Corazon in tears. Corazon gets herself drunk, and Tomas stays by her side, trying to talk some sense into her. He then tells her that he wants them to be more than friends, and immediately sends her a large bouquet of flowers the next day. Meanwhile, JB pays Celine a visit, but Celine tells him that they can't be friends if Corazon still sees Celine as nothing but a trashy woman. She is left to grieve for the child she lost, the product of her love for Brian.
132	"27-3"	April 11, 2007
JB reminisces everything that has happened to him: From his relationship with Celine, Jackie leaving him at the altar, RSL's collapse, to his latest argument with his mother, Corazon. He then clings to his late father's picture, and tells him that he's tired of his life. He stows away some of his belongings in a backpack, planning to leave. He then takes a peek at his sleeping mother on his way out. Soon, he arrives at his beloved Mamu G's house, asking her if she's okay. After he was assured that she's doing great, he proceeds to wait for Jackie, and greets her a happy birthday, which Eli notices from afar. Lastly he pays Celine a visit, and from a distance he looks at Celine, in tears. He then leaves a large bouquet of flowers by her doorstep, which Marsha notices, and later gives Celine. Content, JB leaves, his whereabouts unknown. Jackie finally confronts Eli about his apathy, and JB finally decides to talk. He tells her that try as he might, he can't still find the old Eli that Jackie used to love, and tells her that he needs to find his own self first. Jackie then tells him that when he finally discovers the old Eli, she'll really appreciate it if she's the one he'll come back to the minute he finally finds himself.
133	"27-4"	April 12, 2007
Corazon goes home to find JB gone, and angrily storms to Celine's place, thinking that her son is there. Celine does not know of JB's whereabouts, and Corazon responds by insulting her. With the loss of her husband and her child, Celine has had enough, and threatens to kill Corazon. The latter flees, scared. Meanwhile, Jackie and Eli settle in different rooms, deciding to give each other space. Corazon storms to Gloria's house, demanding her son's whereabouts, leaving Gloria in tears. Celine visits Bryan's remains, and pours out her heart to him.
134	"27-5"	April 13, 2007
A deranged Corazon thrashes about her house, as she misses her son JB. Miserable, she blames it all on Celine, with no self-awareness about her role in the events that have played out. Meanwhile, JB sets on a journey to find himself. It turns out that he's in a faraway location, and has enlisted himself as a worker in a mining site. Eli also goes on his own journey, but this time, he revisits his childhood home. As Eli is reunited with the people he grew up with, JB settles into his own work as a miner. Upon his return home, Eli finds Jackie sleeping on the sofa, seeing her in a different light. During his downtime at work, JB befriends his co-workers, and gets to know their own stories in the process. Corazon begins losing herself in alcohol, while their landlady demands their rent. Meanwhile, JB strums his guitar alone in the dark, and suddenly gets interrupted by a rustling sound. He then goes around the area to investigate, and chances upon a woman bathing in the river.

=== Week 28 ===
No.	Title	Original release date
135	"28-1"	April 16, 2007
Eli is still in search of his father. Eli suspects Tomas is his father. Corazon is still upset that JB has run away and she does not know about his whereabouts. Jackie and Gloria have a talk about how Gloria won't let Jackie ever leave her son and Jackie tells her that will never happen. Tomas visits a drunk Corazon and brings her cake. They talk about JB, etc. JB is still at his new job as miner and talks about the girl he saw in the lake with his fellow miners. Gloria asks Eli to help her find JB and make sure he is alright. Eli says yes to Gloria's request.
136	"28-2"	April 17, 2007
Eli and Tomas found themselves face to face once again. However, Eli believes Tomas and his mother had a past, as a picture in their college yearbook testifies to that. But when Eli mentioned Gloria's name to Tomas, he was disappointed that Tomas didn't register any emotion, as if Gloria didn't become a part of his life her. This leaves Eli dumbfounded, as he tells Mang Simo that his instincts tell him that Tomas may just be the father he has been looking for. Meanwhile, Gloria advises Jackie to go back to business, as she's not doing much at home anyway, and has natural talent at business management. Jackie ends up thinking the same way, when she meets Celine's clients and helps them plan an upcoming wedding. Jackie then tells Celine that she wants to be Celine's partner, and that she likes doing that kind of business. A happy Celine then tells her that she should look forward to a lot of work, and that she's really glad that she finally found someone to split her work with. Celine's preoccupation with work worries Jackie a bit, but Celine tells her that immersing herself in her work is the only way to deal with her loss, and move on with life. Meanwhile, JB spots a bar that's looking for a singer, which gets him thinking. Incidentally, he also notices a stranger, who eyes him curiously.
137	"28-3"	April 18, 2007
As Eli and the rest of the family try to find JB, he stumbles upon a bar in a rural area, and applies as a singer. There he meets Amang, the bar's proprietor. Eli sends his car, Pangga, to Tomas' shop to have it fixed. There a friendship between the two blossoms, and Eli ends up starting a car business, with Tomas as his associate. Jackie happily immerses herself with work, with Celine taunting her that she's spoiling Eli too much with all the affection she's giving him. Corazon lives the hard life, trying to evade her rent, and living life without JB.
138	"28-4"	April 19, 2007
JB gets his first wage in his new job as a singer in Amang's bar. JB returns excess amount of his wage to Amang but finds himself in the pouring rain. Gloria asks Eli to respect her will not to see his father again. Celine tells Jackie that she is just being stupid, loving Eli even though Eli does not return the same amount of love to her. Corazon finds Eli and Tomas in a bar. Eli leaves after Corazon accuses him of stealing what's hers.
139	"28-5"	April 20, 2007
Celine talks to Jackie about her marriage with Eli, and Jackie spills the truth to her cousin. But she says that she married Eli because she loves him, even if their marriage was built on an agreement to save Fidel from Eli's wrath. Jackie adds that she's still wishing the old Eli will come back, and worries over Celine, who looks terribly overworked. Eli cherishes the moments that he had with Tomas, while Jackie tries to balance her duties to Eli as a wife, and her responsibilities to Celine as her co-worker. After a long night at work, Jackie gets surprised by Eli as he brings a newly makeovered Pangga to their doorstep. Celine gets a letter from JB, but does not open it, just like the rest of his letters from him. Also, trouble strikes when Jackie fails to fulfill her responsibilities to Celine.

=== Week 29 ===
No.	Title	Original release date
140	"29-1"	April 23, 2007
Jackie thinks about the exchange with Celine. JB continues to play at the little dive bar on the beach. Sees the "mysterious" girl warming up by the campfire. (The same girl he saw bathing in the river) Jackie goes home only to break down crying thinking about the old Eli. Eli happens to see her and tries to comfort Jackie and tells her not to work so hard. Meanwhile JB reflects by the campfire thinking about his loves and has a nice talk with Amang. Episode closes with JB selling his catch for the day and the "mysterious" girl comes and is buying his catch.
141	"29-2"	April 24, 2007
Eli, Gloria, and Tomas finally meet and they joined in a dinner. Gloria gets pissed off with Eli's behavior during the dinner leading to her walkout. Tomas apologizes for letting Eli feel that he seemed like a true father to him. Tomas accommodates Corazon to his house. The mysterious girl buys fish from JB.
142	"29-3"	April 25, 2007
Eli apologizes to Gloria. Gloria then tells Eli that she is sorry to have kept secret the identity of his father. Showed on flashbacks was the identity of Eli's father, whom Gloria called Samuel. Celine wanted to be friends with Jackie again and they both hug. Tomas reconciles Eli not to feel bad for what happened in their house. Amang gives JB a pair of slippers. Corazon enjoys her first morning in Tomas' house.
143	"29-4"	April 26, 2007
Celine reveals to Jackie her plans to go to Spain along with her family. A woman entrusted by Mang Oca with a letter gives it to Eli. Mang Oca tells in the letter that he was sorry for everything he had done to Eli and to other innocent people involved. Mang Oca also stated in the letter that Eli and Jackie's marriage was void. Eli and Jackie set each other free.
144	"29-5"	April 27, 2007
Celine and Jackie leave the Philippines. Eli also leaves his house and decides to go somewhere else to start a new life for himself.

=== Week 30 ===
No.	Title	Original release date
145	"30-1"	April 30, 2007
Eli reminisces the moments he spent with Jackie. Corazon prepares dinner for Tomas. Eli and Gloria talk on the phone. Gloria says she is busy with charity works and tells Eli not to worry for her. Amang experiences bookkeeping problems in his bar. JB decides to help Amang. Eli starts a new day in the cornfield with farmers. Celine continues to grieve for Brian's death.
146	"30-2"	May 1, 2007
Eli thanks the farmers for accepting him as one of them and vows to live with them for good. While baking, Monique feels that Jackie is sad although Jackie does not admit. Monique tells Siony how she sees Jackie's sadness and how she wants her daughter to be happy. Meanwhile, Celine and Jackie, along with Siony, return to the Philippines. As they share dinner, Jackie finds out that Eli has been gone off the house for a long time. Jackie then misses Eli and cries in their then-bedroom. Celine, Jackie, and Siony leaves the house to visit a place. JB and Amang go to Manila. JB crosses path with his mother inside a restaurant.
147	"30-3"	May 2, 2007
Celine brings Jackie to Eli's place. JB and Amang eat dinner. Amang shares his plans to stay for two days in Manila. Eli welcomes Jackie, Celine, and Guada in his place. JB tries to find Corazon. JB calls Mamu G and tells her that he would not be coming back anytime soon. Jackie finds it hard to sleep and decides to go to the beach. Jackie was not able to notice that Eli was just sitting in a couch a few meters behind her. Eli wishes that everything happening right now is not a dream at all. JB and Amang return to their place. Celine gets a new bracelet which showered memories of JB.
148	"30-4"	May 3, 2007
Eli tells Jackie how happy he is to be on the island and how he might even want to grow old there. Jackie tells Celine how sad it makes her that Eli is so happy without her. Corazon shows up at Gloria's house in the car that Tomas gave her and drives away after she makes her appearance.
149	"30-5"	May 4, 2007
Jackie tours out in the farm. While she is resting in a nearby tree, ants bit her in the back and Eli came to attempt helping her. Jackie heard a carabao moo and jumped to Eli because she is scared.

=== Week 31 ===
No.	Title	Original release date
150	"31-1"	May 7, 2007
Aling Bebeng notices that Gloria is lonely because she has not seen Eli yet for a while. Jackie continues to live with Eli in the place while Celine and Guada are helping the pearl vendors.
151	"31-2"	May 8, 2007
Eli and Jackie attends a dance celebration. Celine and Guada come back from their "mission". A drunk Eli shares a passionate kiss with Jackie. Celine tries to convince Eli to do the first move and court Jackie again if he still loves her. Tomas and Corazon visits Gloria.
152	"31-3"	May 9, 2007
Jackie tries to leave but Celine was able to convince her to stay. JB gets in an encounter with a group of drunk men in Amang's bar, which led into a fight. Amang saves JB. JB notices of Amang's fists. Corazon puts the blame on JB for getting stuck in her current life. Tomas visits Gloria. Corazon gets mad when Tomas goes home late. Tomas tells Corazon to be the girl she wants her to be so that everything would be alright. The next day, Tomas accompanies Corazon to Gloria's house. Gloria and Corazon confronts each other in a cold war about their personal issues.
153	"31-4"	May 10, 2007
Jackie gets curious about Celine's box which she doesn't want to open. Eli brings a large fish but when he told that he remembered Jackie because of the size of the fish, Jackie gets pissed off with his remarks. Celine tries to convince Jackie to swim with her. Gloria still thinks about Corazon's remarks against her. Eli and Gloria talk on the phone. Gloria then entasks someone to find Eli's father. Eli and Jackie share a passionate staredown at the beach. Jackie feels happy deep within when Eli said that he would rather look at the sea and to Jackie herself than swim. Jackie even mistakenly was about to go to the beach in the wrong way. When Eli told her that the way to the beach was the opposite of where she was walking into. Jackie tells Celine that she never expected the stay they had to be memorable as what she thought. Celine teases Jackie of her feelings for Eli. JB sees Celine in the market. As Celine was about to leave, JB runs to find her but fails to catch her up.
154	"31-5"	May 11, 2007
JB performs quite awfully in Amang's bar. When asked by Amang what happened, JB says that he was not feeling well but promises to perform better the next day. He feels bothered when he saw Celine but didn't catch her up earlier in the market. As JB stares into the sea, Celine was also shown staring in the sea as she sits in a cottage far away from him (JB). Meanwhile, Jackie wakes up and finds a pearl necklace beside her bed, thinking that Eli gave it to her. As Jackie thanks Eli, Eli says that he just bought the necklace in threesome also for Celine and Guada, leading to Jackie getting pissed off again. Jackie ignores breakfast and as she leaves, Eli tells her to take care. Jackie stopped for a moment but then ignored Eli's remark. Jackie says that she wants to go back to Manila but Celine just kept on teasing her with Eli. JB tells Amang that she will not sing for the night. When Amang asked why, JB explains that he saw his "true love" (Celine). Amang wants him to sing however for the next day and reminds him that he cannot hide his heart because the time will come when he would search for the girl he truly loves. JB asks a vendor in the market about Celine's appearance. JB decides to wait for any signs of Celine in the market until the night but fails to see any.

=== Week 32 ===
No.	Title	Original release date
155	"32-1"	May 14, 2007
Eli and Jackie are friends again after some teasing made by Eli during the mass they attended. Celine tells Jackie that she would be staying in the island. Eli feels lonely during the despedida party for Jackie. Celine tells Eli how love is so sophisticated. Jackie thanks Eli for everything and Eli informs Jackie that he would be going to Manila in about a week later, which means he can't go along with Jackie to Manila. Eli and Jackie feel themselves in the midst of confusion as they say their goodbyes and take-cares in the beach before Jackie's departure.
156	"32-2"	May 15, 2007
Eli runs for Jackie as she leaves for Manila and catches her up. Eli finally tells Jackie again that he loves her. Together with Guada, they return to the island and were joyfully met by Celine. JB comes back to the market where he saw Celine and persists on looking at her again. Eli calls Gloria and tells her that they will soon be living together in the island. Jackie is happy that Eli has finally confessed his love for her. Celine and Jackie wishes for each other. Celine continues to look over the letters that JB sent her but still does not open them up. JB still fails to see Celine in the market. JB sings "Hinahanap-hanap Kita" in Amang's bar as he remembers singing the same song with Celine a long time ago. In the beach, Eli gives Jackie his necklace as a sign of his eternal love and he proposes his marriage to Jackie, in which Jackie happily accepts!
157	"32-3"	May 16, 2007
Amang tells about his past love. Showed on the flashbacks were Gloria and Amang, who turned out to be Samuel. Amang talks about how he fell in love with the girl he first and last loved. As JB was wondering about the scarf Amang was wearing, Amang tells that it reminds him that he had been in true love. Eli and Gloria talk on the phone. Gloria asks Eli if he still wants to know his father. Eli says that all he wants at the moment is for Gloria to be happy. Gloria learns that Samuel, Eli's Father (who turned out to be Amang), is residing in the Philippines. Eli buys ring for Jackie. Jackie sees JB in the market and runs to him. They both hug. Jackie was about to bring JB to where she left Celine in the market but did not found her there so she decided to find Celine. When Jackie left, JB saw Celine nearby and shared a staredown.
158	"32-4"	May 17, 2007
JB approaches Celine, who seems unhappy seeing him. They both talk about their respective present lives, with Celine seems like holding back something. Jackie feels glad finally meeting JB again. However, Celine cuts the conversation short, and tells JB that she needs to do something immediately. Celine felt troubled after seeing JB. JB and Jackie talk about each other's lives. JB then invites Eli and Jackie to go on a date at Sola de Amor, the bar where he works for. Jackie agrees for the invitation. Back home, she then invites Celine to go to the bar where JB works for, but Celine ignored her. At the bar, JB and Eli talked, and finally fixed whatever grudge they have against each other. The two shared a familial embrace, and JB congratulates Eli and Jackie for their upcoming wedding. They go on sharing that they're living their dreams now: JB, as a singer by the sea, and Eli tilling in the farm. Celine contemplates on JB and Bryan, holding her wedding ring and going through JB's letters. JB tells Jackie that he understands Celine very well, and he introduces them to Amang, and Eli feels as if Amang is someone familiar. That day, Jackie, Eli and Guada set off to Manila, with Celine left behind. As the three board to the boat away from the island, Celine prepares to leave for the Kapitolyo as well. Surprisingly, JB's boat comes speeding to the shore and invites Celine for the ride. However, Celine refuses him, and goes to the Kapitolyo alone.
159	"32-5"	May 18, 2007
JB still doesn't get too far from Celine at the Kapitolyo. Eli, Jackie, and Guada return home to Manila. Gloria gets a letter from JB. Eli talks with Monique on the phone and promises her that he will love and take care of Jackie. Monique gives Eli her blessings. Jackie talks to her dad and tells him that she's getting married again. Corazon gets furious as Tomas goes home because he missed dinner. Tomas and Corazon argue with pride. JB serenades Celine, who doesn't feel happy for his efforts. Celine tells him to stop singing and they went to talk inside about their present lives. JB tells Celine how he feels like a better person now. Celine feels glad for JB. Celine also talks about how she is rebuilding her life in this place. Celine finally tells JB that he has no hope in loving her again.

=== Week 33 ===
No.	Title	Original release date
160	"33-1"	May 21, 2007
Eli brings Corazon JB's letter. Corazon forces Eli to leave but Tomas appeared, invites Eli for lunch, and tells Corazon to cook for lunch. Corazon refuses to cook and walks away. Gloria tells Eli that the search for his father is on. Celine finally opens JB's letters for her and reads them. Celine finally confronts JB. JB asks Celine to let him love her. JB and Celine kiss and hug. Jackie serves breakfast for Eli. Jackie and Eli kiss each other but were interrupted by a distant sound. Eli, Jackie, JB, and Celine share joyful moments with each of their respective partners. Pong finally gets out of the asylum. From a distance, someone watches Eli and Jackie closely, swearing vengeance on Eli, who has supposedly wronged him.
161	"33-2"	May 22, 2007
Celine and Amang watch JB perform "Hiling" at his best in Sola de Amor. Eli and Jackie return to the island with Gloria, Mang Simo, Aling Bebeng, and Guada. JB reunites with Mamu G. Corazon reads JB's letter. The same guy who watched Eli and Jackie yesterday remembers his past criminal encounters. Tomas wakes up in bed without Corazon beside her. Tomas finds a wallet and a letter. Eli sees Amang play the piano. Gloria and Samuel (Amang) finally see each other after a long time. Gloria tells Samuel that she wants to correct her mistakes but Samuel refuses her intentions. Gloria tells Eli that his father, Samuel, is in the same place. Eli tells Samuel that he is Gloria's son but Samuel denies having a child with Gloria. Samuel tells Eli to leave him alone. JB tries to convince Samuel to change his own life but gets ignored. Corazon suddenly appears in the island and sees JB. They both hug. Samuel is quite shocked seeing Corazon. Meanwhile, Tomas arrives in the island. Behind him stands the same man hungry for vengeance on Eli.
162	"33-3"	May 23, 2007
JB apologizes to Corazon. Corazon still shows her hatred for Celine. Samuel approaches Corazon, who is revealed as his first and last love. Corazon despises Samuel. Tomas arrives and tries to drag Corazon away but was stopped by Samuel. Tomas meets Samuel after a long time. Flashbacks were shown when Tomas once shot Samuel's left hand with a gun after a confrontation involving Tomas' girl. Samuel says that his war with Tomas is not over yet. Back home, Tomas threatens to cut Corazon's hand for stealing his money and leaving without consent. Celine tells JB that she might not forgive Corazon but she wants him to forgive his mother. Celine says that if one day he has to choose between Celine and his mother, she understands if he chooses his mother because she is his mother. JB tells Celine that he doesn't need to choose and that he will never leave her no matter what. JB says that if there's one thing he has learned from all his journeys that is to simply follow his heart and that it's only now that he has learned to listen to his heart and that's the reason he's happy now. He says that his heart only beats for Celine. Then he reaches out to hold Celine's hand and kisses it. Gloria tells Samuel that she will no longer acquaint herself and Eli with him. Eli invites "Amang" for the engagement party. While Celine watches the happy couple, JB sneaks up behind her giving her quite a surprise. JB then says, "Ikaw kasi eh. You look pretty envious of them. Next time it'll be us doing this. And don't wory, I'll save up for a big engagement party like this." Celine tells him that she doesn't need a big engagement party. But JB says that it doesn't matter because he just wants to show her how much she means to him and how much he loves her. JB takes a step forward and says to Celine, "I love you Celine. I will always love you." After hearing JB say I love you to Celine, she just smiles, a bit uncomfortably, because she is still afraid to say I love you to JB. And then they hug. On the other hand, an unknown person stares at a picture of Eli. Eli finally proposes his marriage with Jackie, who happily accepted it. Just as everything seemed to turn out alright, the party was ruined when Eli was shot with a gun by his secret enemy.
163	"33-4"	May 24, 2007
At the hospital, Eli's "spirit" looks down over his comatose body in bed, wept upon by Jackie and Gloria. In his spiritual form, Eli tries to let the real world perceive him. He sits in a corner, cries, and was laid a hand by none other than Dadoods. Somewhere like a fountain, Dadoods talks to Eli (both of whom are spirits) about his journey. Eli tells Dadoods that he won't die yet and he will come back to life. Celine shows her concern for Jackie. Guada narrates Pong of what Atong, the man who shot Eli, had done and what happened to him. Jackie chooses to remain beside Eli. Celine tries to persuade Jackie to go home and get some rest and also comforts Jackie. Jackie says that she wants to stay with Eli so that every day she can tell him that she loves him very much. This made Celine think of JB because since they got back together she hasn't told him yet that she loves him because she is afraid. Along the hospital lobby, Celine shares coffee with JB, who had quite a hard time bringing it to her. While drinking his very hot cup of coffee, Celine finally says to JB "JB, if I haven't said it yet, I want to say it now. I love you." JB smiles and then they hug. Monique arrives at the hospital, who didn't expect herself to be visiting there, as she was supposed to attend her daughter's wedding. Monique tells Jackie how Fidel felt peaceful when Eli finally consoled with him, asked forgiveness for everything he had done. After 2 weeks, Eli still lies comatose in bed. Jackie is still there, taking care of him. Jackie wishes she could at least feel Eli's presence even for just a while.
164	"33-5 (Season Finale)"	May 25, 2007
Gloria sees Corazon in the hospital. Corazon gets a slap from her sister after disrespecting Eli's condition. Corazon sees JB with Celine and tells him that he lost his mother the day he walked out on her. Back home, Corazon gets a few surprises from Tomas, as well as a choke for the impatience she brought him. Dadoods advises Eli in the spirit world about love before leaving. Months passed by and Eli still laid in bed in the hospital. Before leaving for good, Eli, in his spiritual form, sends his last rites for Jackie, telling her to live and love again. Eli goes to the fountain, surrenders his soul to the Lord, and jumps down to the falls. At the exact moment, Eli's body dies. Jackie prayed hard that Eli might live again. Jackie wept in sorrow until she heard Eli's heart beat. And Eli woke up, much to Jackie's joy! Meanwhile, Tomas prohibits a battered Corazon to attend Eli and Jackie's church wedding. Samuel looks at a picture of Eli, brought to him by a smoking person and the mysterious girl who was once seen by JB. On the other hand, Eli and Jackie finally get wed in church. As the wedding ceremony ended, they walked down the aisle happily. Suddenly, they were congratulated by a woman in black robe, who appeared unknown to them. Eli asked the woman if he knew her but she said that he'll meet her soon enough! Behind her stood the mysterious girl. They congratulate the newly-weds. The woman in black robe says in mind that this story has not yet ended, and that her appearance marks the beginning of a new chapter in the lives of Eli, Jackie, Celine, and JB.

== See also ==
- Maging Sino Ka Man
