= Antonio Aquitania =

Filipino actor (born 1977)

- Born: Antonio Ford Aquitania; January 16, 1977 (age 49); Dagupan City, Pangasinan, Philippines
- Education: Holy Angel University
- Occupations: Actor; comedian; host; model
- Years active: 1994–present
- Family: Jay Aquitania (brother)

Antonio Ford Aquitania (born January 16, 1977) is a Filipino actor, comedian, host, and model. He initially pursued an acting career with ABS-CBN before gaining recognition as one of the original cast members of the comedy gag show Bubble Gang in 1995, where he remained until its revamp in 2022.

== Career ==
Aquitania made his first television appearance in 1994 as a later addition to the long-running ABS-CBN's sitcom series Palibhasa Lalake. He also appeared in guest roles in various episodes of the drama anthology Maalaala Mo Kaya on the same network. Later that year, Aquitania transferred to GMA Network and became one of the original cast members of the comedy show Bubble Gang, alongside Ogie Alcasid, Michael V., Wendell Ramos, Assunta De Rossi, and others. He left in May 2022, following the show's revamp. Aquitania appeared in the comedy gag show Ooops! with Wendell Ramos in 1996. In the same year, Aquitania made his film debut with Kabilin-Bilinan ng Lola, produced by Regal Entertainment, followed by Sex Drive in 2003, produced by Viva Entertainment—both films with Ramos.

In 2012, Aquitania was part of the cast of the Philippine remake of the Korean television drama series Temptation of Wife. In 2013, he played the role of Sebastian Monteverde in drama fantasy Kakambal ni Eliana. In 2014, he appeared in three television programs: he played Tirso in sitcom Vampire ang Daddy Ko, Benedict Corpuz in drama romance Hiram na Alaala, and Luigi in drama romance Paraiso Ko’y Ikaw. Aquitania was included in the 2015 drama film Felix Manalo alongside Dennis Trillo. In 2016, Aquitania played the role of Rod in television drama series Sa Piling ni Nanay. In 2020, he portrayed Bienvenido Garcia in drama romance action Descendants of the Sun. In 2022, he played Bong Sandejas in drama Raising Mamay. In 2023, he took on the role of Ronnie Sarmiento in drama AraBella and Jonas in drama romance action Maging Sino Ka Man. In 2024, he played Rafael "Paeng" Advincula in comedy drama Walang Matigas na Pulis sa Matinik na Misis. In 2025, he portrayed Lorenzo in drama action Incognito.

== Personal life ==
Aquitania is Karla Estrada's cousin. His cousin's son Daniel Padilla is also an actor, host and a singer. Aquitania is a member of Iglesia ni Cristo.

== Filmography ==
=== Television ===
Year	Title	Role
1994	Palibhasa Lalake	Anton
1994	Maalaala Mo Kaya	Various roles
1995	Bubble Gang	Himself (various roles)
1996	Oooops! With Wendell & Antonio	Himself (host)
1999	Maynila	Himself
2000	Kakabakaba (Episode: Bloody Wardrobe)	Himself
2000	GMA Telecine Specials	Himself
2001	GMA Love Stories	Himself
2001	Idol Ko si Kap	
2002	Magpakailanman	Himself (various roles)
2004	Love to Love: True Romance	Paco
2005	Ang Mahiwagang Baul: Kung Bakit May Korona ang Bayabas	Bai-Abas
2005	HP: To the Highest Level Na!	Caloy
2005	Encantadia	Alipato
2006	Wag Kukurap: Her Lover	Himself
2006	Hokus Pokus	Caloy
2006	Now and Forever: Linlang	Samuel
2007	Magpakailanman: The Liza Dela Cruz Story	Nester
2008	E.S.P.	Himself
2008	Obra: Misteryosa	Alex
2009	Zorro	Bernardo
2010	Pilyang Kerubin	Eugene Abalos
2011	I Heart You, Pare!	Sonny Boy
2011	Pahiram ng Isang Ina	Johnny Velasco
2012	Temptation of Wife	Leo Santos
2013	Kakambal ni Eliana	Sebastian Monteverde
2014	Vampire ang Daddy Ko	Tirso
2014	Hiram na Alaala	Benedict Corpuz
2014	Paraiso Ko'y Ikaw	Luigi
2015	Sabado Badoo	Cameo footage featured
2015	Imbestigador: Hinalay sa Loob ng Bahay	Jay-R Vergara
2015	Karelasyon Presents: Blackmail	Rodel
2016	Sa Piling ni Nanay	Rod
2017	Meant to Be	Balloon Vendor
2017	Dear Uge	Guding
2018	Dear Uge	Henry
2018	Ika-5 Utos	Benjie Manupil
2018	Tonight with Arnold Clavio	Himself
2019	Tadhana	Rico
2019	Daddy's Gurl	Himself (guest)
2019	Mars Pa More	Himself (guest)
2020	Descendants of the Sun	Colonel Bienvenido Garcia
2022	Raising Mamay	Bong Sandejas
2023	AraBella	Ronnie Sarmiento
2023	Maging Sino Ka Man	Jonas
2024	Walang Matigas na Pulis sa Matinik na Misis	Rafael "Paeng" Advincula
2025	Incognito	Lorenzo
2026	Blood vs Duty	SPO3 Patrick Marquez
2026	The Loyalty Game	Reynaldo Madrigal

=== Film ===
- Kabilin-bilinan ni Lola (1996)
- Impakto (1996)
- Banatan (1999)
- Most Wanted (2000)
- Hibla (2002)
- Nympha (2003)
- Sex Drive (2003)
- Captain Barbell (2003)
- Masikip sa Dibdib: The Boobita Rose Story (2004)
- Ispiritista: Itay, May Moomoo (2005)
- Enteng Kabisote 3: Okay Ka, Fairy Ko: The Legend Goes On and On and On (2006)
- Pasukob (Octoarts Films, 2007)
- Working Girls (2010)
- Boy Pick-Up: The Movie (2012)
- Coming Soon (2013)
- 10,000 Hours (2013)
- Felix Manalo (2015)
- Hapi ng Buhay (EBC Films, 2018)
- Ang Taran Tanods (2019)
