= List of Descendants of the Sun episodes =

Descendants of the Sun is a 2020 Philippine television drama action series broadcast by GMA Network. The series is based on a 2016 South Korean television drama series of the same title. It premiered on the network's Telebabad line up and worldwide via GMA Pinoy TV from February 10, 2020 to December 25, 2020, replacing The Gift and was replaced by the returning Love of My Life.

== Series overview ==
Season	Episodes	Originally released	
Season	Episodes	First released	Last released
1	65	February 10, 2020	December 25, 2020

== Episodes ==
No. overall	No. in season	Title	Social media hashtag	Original release date	AGB Nielsen Ratings (NUTAM People)	Timeslot rank
1	1	"World Premiere"	#DescendantsOfTheSunPH	February 10, 2020	10.5%	#2
Much to his surprise, CPT. Lucas Manalo's perspective in love suddenly changes upon meeting Dr. Maxine Dela Cruz in the most unexpected way.
2	2	"First Impression"	#DOTSPHFirstImpression	February 11, 2020	11.5%	#2
After an assaulted patient was rushed to the hospital by CPT. Lucas Manalo and TSg. Diego Ramos, the former leaves a lasting impression to Dr. Maxine to prove that he's not the type of guy she thinks he is.
3	3	"First Date"	#DOTSPHFirstDate	February 12, 2020	11.0%	#2
Big Boss bravely asks Dr. Maxine if she is willing to go out on a date with him.
4	4	"The Mission"	#DOTSPHTheMission	February 13, 2020	10.8%	#2
Despite their contrasting jobs, Cpt. Lucas Manalo gets to know Dr. Maxine better by asking her out on a first date which turns out unusual for the both of them.
5	5	"Heartbreak"	#DOTSPHHeartbreak	February 14, 2020	10.6%	#2
CPT. Lucas' secret has been exposed as LTGEN Abraham Manalo AFP mentions his real profession to Dr. Maxine. In this upsetting moment, the celebrity doctor decided to talk with Big Boss and asks him to cut all their feelings for each other.
6	6	"Moving On"	#DOTSPHMovingOn	February 17, 2020	9.5%	#2
TSg. Diego Ramos tries to keep his distance from CPT. Moira Defensor because of their indifferences but his heart still longs for her love.
7	7	"Muling Pagkikita" (transl. Meeting Again)	#DOTSPHMulingPagkikita	February 18, 2020	10.5%	#2
Dr. Maxine signs up for a medical mission not knowing that Lucas also got assigned there for a mission where they are going to work hand-in-hand.
8	8	"It's Complicated"	#DOTSPHItsComplicated	February 19, 2020	10.1%	#2
As much as Dr. Maxine's desire to hide away from Big Boss, the people in Urdan still needs her medical expertise, further prompting her to stay professional and put her true feelings aside.
9	9	"Black vs. White"	#DOTSPHBlackVsWhite	February 20, 2020	10.7%	#2
Cpt. Lucas Manalo and Dr. Maxine will try to outlast each other at the military camp as they pull off the goofiest pranks against the two of them.
10	10	"War and Love"	#DOTSPHWarAndLove	February 21, 2020	10.9%	#2
Despite their differences, Dr. Maxine and CPT. Lucas decided to stay on each other's side to fulfil their mission in Urdan.
11	11	"Shipwreck Promise"	#DOTSPHShipwreckPromise	February 24, 2020	10.1%	#2
Things are getting better between Dr. Maxine and CPT. Lucas Manalo but she is still in doubt being in a relationship with him because of his profession.
12	12	"The VIP"	#DOTSPHTheVIP	February 25, 2020	10.9%	#2
Dr. Maxine feels awkward between CPT. Moira Defensor and CPT. Lucas Manalo upon discovering that they are having an affair. Turns out, the two are only pretending to see how will she react to this.
13	13	"Crossfire"	#DOTSPHCrossfire	February 26, 2020	10.2%	#2
Alif Fayad's life is on the line after being shot by the PRG under CPT. Lucas' protection. Big Boss rushed into the medicube to let Dr. Maxine cure the dying prince until its private security halted the operation due to the king's order.
14	14	"Life and Death"	#DOTSPHLifeAndDeath	February 27, 2020	9.8%	#2
Dr. Maxine performs the biggest operation of her life when Alif Fayad was badly injured after getting shot while visiting the town of Urdan.
15	15	"Jealousy"	#DOTSPHJealousy	February 28, 2020	10.1%	#2
The success of the Alpha Team and the medical team become a good impression to Alif Fayad. To return the favor, he invited CPT. Lucas and Dr. Maxine to an intimate dinner. In the middle of the night, Big Boss bravely confesses his feelings to Doc Beauty.
16	16	"Urong Sulong" (transl. Recession)	#DOTSPHUrongSulong	March 2, 2020	10.8%	#2
Furious and disappointed about CPT. Lucas reckless decision, COL. Garcia summons TSg. Diego at the base camp of the military and pounds him with insults. Due to this painful scenario, CPT. Moira tries to comfort the latter but then resulted to officially breaking up with her.
17	17	"The Kiss"	#DOTSPHTheKiss	March 3, 2020	11.1%	#2
To be able to fight for CPT. Lucas' reputation as a soldier, Dr. Maxine goes to the military camp to talk with COL. Garcia. Instead of clearing Big Boss' name, she makes the situation worse as the penalized soldier grabs him out of the camp. After a series of argument, Doc Beauty treats herself with a wine in the middle of the night until CPT. Lucas arrives to share a kiss with her.
18	18	"Cliff Rescue"	#DOTSPHCliffRescue	March 4, 2020	10.6%	#2
While CPT. Lucas and Dr. Maxine are having their early lunch date in Denise's place, the former was bothered by a commotion outside the store and quickly responds to the Urdan residents' call for help. As Doc Beauty returns to the camp, she gets into an accident that almost cost her life. Luckily, CPT. Lucas came to the rescue to help her get off the dangerous cliff.
19	19	"Lucas vs. Rodel"	#DOTSPHLucasVsRodel	March 5, 2020	11.3%	#2
As the Alpha Team get into another encounter against the rebel group, Dr. Maxine is already inches closer to reuniting with her estranged brother Rodel when the latter's wife was rushed to the medical cube of the military camp in Urdan.
20	20	"Guilty"	#DOTSPHGuilty	March 6, 2020	11.3%	#2
The whole camp and medicube in Urdan is in panic after CPT. Lucas identifies Janet as an asset to locate the PRG. Will Dr. Maxine believes Big Boss' claim even it violates her dignity as a professional doctor?
21	21	"Kidnap"	#DOTSPHKidnap	March 9, 2020	11.4%	#2
Dr. Maxine and her medical squad are being held captive by the PRG upon entering Urdan's red zone. Will the Alpha Team led by CPT. Lucas be able to save them from harm?
22	22	"Bihag" (transl. Captive)	#DOTSPHBihag	March 10, 2020	11.8%	#2
CPT. Lucas and the Alpha Team engage into a bloody shootout encounter with the PRG. Will they be able to execute their plans against the rebel group?
23	23	"Kabayaran" (transl. Payment)	#DOTSPHKabayaran	March 11, 2020	11.5%	#2
The Alpha Team successfully eliminates 32 members of the PRG with Big Boss and Wolf's lead. On the other hand, Col. Garcia blames Dr. Maxine for all of the casualties caused by her reckless decision.
24	24	"The Apology"	#DOTSPHTheApology	March 12, 2020	11.9%	#2
Feeling anxious over the fact that his men barely survived the rebel group's attack in Urdan, Cpt. Lucas blames Dr. Maxine for all the wrongdoings she caused, provoking the latter to apologize. Will the two make amends for good?
25	25	"The Missing Rebel"	#DOTSPHTheMissingRebel	March 13, 2020	12.4%	#2
The suspected deaths of Bullet and Janet may have signified PRG's defeat but Greg continues to fight for their dignity and will take their revenge against the military. On the other hand, Big Boss and the Alpha Team undergo a secret mission to take down Urdan's rebel group.
26	26	"Social Distancing"	#DOTSPHSocialDistancing	March 16, 2020	12.8%	#1
The long battle in Urdan comes to an end as PRG leader Bullet is found dead along with his pregnant wife Janet. Big Boss and the Alpha Team then call the mission a success as they went back to the camp. Col. Garcia ordered CPT. Lucas and TSg. Diego to be immediately relieved from their post and are required to leave Urdan as part of their suspension regarding Alif Fayad's incident.
27	27	"Urdan Miners"	#DOTSPHUrdanMiners	March 17, 2020	14.5%	#2
After CPT. Lucas' departure in the camp, Dr. Maxine starts her new life with the residents of Urdan. The medical team goes yet on another mission as they provide medical needs to Urdan's miners. Without Big Boss' leadership, will they be able to manage the danger from the war-stricken place?
28	28	"Earthquake"	#DOTSPHEarthquake	March 18, 2020	14.7%	#1
The medical team's mission in Urdan has come to an end as advised by their hospital CEO. Dr. Maxine and her team bid their farewell to their friends and the military members. In the middle of their flight going back to Manila, an intense earthquake strikes Urdan that recorded multiple casualties.
29	29	"Sintas" (transl. Lace)	#DOTSPHSintas	November 5, 2020	N/A	TBA
CPT. Lucas and TSg. Diego get assigned once again in Urdan to facilitate a rescue operation after a strong earthquake struck the mining place of the province. On the other hand, Dr. Maxine and CPT. Moira joined forces to provide medical assistance to the victims of the calamity.
30	30	"Rescue"	#DOTSPHRescue	November 6, 2020	N/A	TBA
Dr. Maxine must determine who to save, Mang Norman or Mang Lito, in order to save the miners trapped inside the mining field. In this rescue mission, one wrong move, both miners will die of pain and trauma. In this life and death case, what would Dr. Maxine do?
31	31	"Harana" (transl. Serenade)	#DOTSPHHarana	November 9, 2020	14.7%	#1
After a devastating earthquake in Urdan, CPT. Lucas and the Alpha Team finally managed to execute a successful rescue operation. Meanwhile, the medical team led by Dr. Maxine is busy accommodating wounded survivors of the calamity in Urdan.
32	32	"Team GoRa"	#DOTSPHTeamGoRa	November 10, 2020	N/A	TBA
In the middle of a quiet night in Urdan, Dr. Maxine is planning to confront CPT. Lucas and determine whether she will embrace or deny his affection.
33	33	"Soldier's Love"	#DOTSPHSoldiersLove	November 11, 2020	N/A	TBA
As commanded by the PRG, Manager Ed asks Biboy to go inside the mining tunnel to retrieve his precious diamonds. While the boy gets trapped inside the tunnel, CPT. Lucas decides to rescue Biboy to avoid reporting another casualty. In the middle of his rescue operation, an unexpected aftershock strikes Urdan once again. Will he be able to survive this life-threatening mission?
34	34	"Aftershock"	#DOTSPHAfterShock	November 12, 2020	N/A	TBA
Dr. Maxine together with TSg. Diego execute a rescue operation inside the mine tunnel to save CPT. Lucas and Biboy who's experiencing seizures due to his illness. Will they be able to rescue Big Boss and Biboy right on time before another aftershock hits Urdan?
35	35	"Beauty Saves Big Boss"	#DOTSPHBeautySavesBigBoss	November 13, 2020	12.4%	#1
Wolf and Dr. Maxine split their tasks inside the mine tunnel to save CPT. Lucas and Biboy. He eventually found his escape route from the tunnel, with the aid of the Alpha Team. Dr. Maxine is trying to keep her composure when Big Boss is dying of wounds on his body.
36	36	"Blood Brothers"	#DOTSPHBloodBrothers	November 16, 2020	11.1%	#1
The medical team led by Dr. Maxine and CPT. Moira are doing their best to save CPT. Lucas from dying. Because of this, TSg. Diego decided to donate his blood to Big Boss despite his weak condition. Will he survive this life and death situation?
37	37	"Phone Confession"	#DOTSPHPhoneConfession	November 17, 2020	N/A	TBA
Now that the medical team is required to return to Manila, CPT. Lucas worries about his relationship with Dr. Maxine. After getting rejected for the nth time, he almost decided to give up until he heard a voice recording of Doc Beauty confessing her feelings for him! Dr. Maxine gets exposed!
38	38	"Aminin" (transl. Admit)	#DOTSPHAminin	November 18, 2020	13.9%	#1
Dr. Maxine and CPT. Lucas became the talk of the whole medical and military team after her mass confession via Daniel's speakers spread all over Urdan. She might have escaped the embarrassment of this incident but she will never escape her feelings with Big Boss. Will this serve as the beginning of their on-and-off love affair?
39	39	"Malaya" (transl. Free)	#DOTSPHMalaya	November 19, 2020	14.9%	#1
BGEN. Carlos finally approves CPT. Moira and TSg. Diego's relationship after witnessing the man's determination to protect her daughter. On the other hand, CPT. Lucas receives the sweetest approval from Dr. Maxine after their roller coaster love affair. As Big Boss and Wolf celebrate their success, a mysterious parcel from two mysterious women arrived in the medicube. While the parcel is on the hands of Dr. Maxine and CPT. Moira, a new love war brews in Urdan!
40	40	"Love and War"	#DOTSPHLoveAndWar	November 20, 2020	13.6%	#1
CPT. Lucas and TSg. Diego are now facing the toughest battle they will ever face - Dr. Maxine and CPT. Moira's anger. How are they going to defend their loyalty against these insane doctors?
41	41	"Soup For Lovers"	#DOTSPHSoupForLovers	November 23, 2020	13.7%	#1
To make up from their cheating incident, CPT. Lucas and TSg. Diego transform themselves into a military chef by cooking a special chicken soup for their doctor girlfriends. As Dr. Maxine and CPT. Moira taste Big Boss and Wolf's recipe, they unconsciously talked about their past love life with the same man named Trevor.
42	42	"Lost Brother"	#DOTSPHLostBrother	November 24, 2020	N/A	TBA
While CPT. Lucas focuses on their mission to take down the PRG, Dr. Maxine gets a glimpse of the composite sketch of one of the rebel members who somehow has a resemblance to her estranged brother.
43	43	"Diego's Story"	#DOTSPHDiegosStory	November 25, 2020	12.5%	#1
With the threat of PRG led by former military members Bullet and Greg, Urdan is still on the edge of danger due to the anticipated civil war. CPT. Lucas and the Alpha Team plan a counterattack to stop the powerful invasion of the rebel group. Now that Dr. Maxine and CPT. Moira are the closest target of PRG, will the special forces be able to save them without the aid of TSg. Diego?
44	44	"Special Forces Unit"	#DOTSPHSpecialForcesUnit	November 26, 2020	14.3%	#1
Bullet barely escapes the trap of the Alpha Team until the reckless PRG fires multiple gunshots to save their leader. While CPT. Lucas's team is undermanned, Greg and his rebel group grabbed the opportunity to force the military to concede.
45	45	"GoRa Over"	#DOTSPHGoraOver	November 27, 2020	N/A	TBA
TSg. Diego is more than happy to break up with CPT. Moira as vengeance for his senior military chief after learning the past story of her mother and BGEN. Carlos.
46	46	"Toxin Attack"	#DOTSPHToxinAttack	November 30, 2020	N/A	TBA
While CPT. Lucas and TSg. Diego are away from their post, a mysterious man from PRG unleashed a deadly virus that could possibly harm the whole medical team. With this, CPT. Moira becomes the main carrier and has the potential to spread the disease throughout Urdan. How will Big Boss and Wolf prevent this from happening?
47	47	"Moira's Fight"	#DOTSPHMoirasFight	December 1, 2020	13.5%	#1
CPT. Lucas orders the half of the Alpha Team to the military's landing area to collect the anti-virus medicines. As Wolf and Daniel received the medkits, an unexpected ambush occurs planned by the PRG. Will the special forces be able to defend the medicines need by the virus victims?
48	48	"Type B Beauty"	#DOTSPHTypeBBeauty	December 2, 2020	15.1%	#1
While Dr. Maxine and her team were escorted by TSg. Diego, they found an unconscious body of a mysterious man covered in blood. Will she be able to recognize her estranged brother?
49	49	"Kuya" (transl. Brother)	#DOTSPHKuya	December 3, 2020	N/A	TBA
After years of looking for her brother, Dr. Maxine finally meets Rodel, also known as Bullet - the leader of PRG. As Harry Potter recognizes the face of their enemy, he quickly called for military back-up from Big Boss to seize the wounded rebel.
50	50	"Torn"	#DOTSPHTorn	December 4, 2020	N/A	TBA
Before Dr. Maxine let Rodel escape from the hideout, the Alpha Team almost captured the former PRG leader. Once again, CPT. Lucas is fooled by his mortal enemy. Will Doc Beauty confess to Big Boss that Bullet is linked to her?
51	51	"Where is Maxine?"	#DOTSPHWhereIsMaxine	December 7, 2020	13.9%	#1
Dr. Maxine's plan on curing her brother's wounds ends up in a big revelation as she discovers the reason why Bullet, the former PRG leader, was removed from the military.
52	52	"Saving Brother"	#DOTSPHSavingBrother	December 8, 2020	13.8%	#1
Secretly violating the military protocol, Dr. Maxine goes to the other location of the PRG to cure Bullet's wound after his encounter with the Alpha Team. Meanwhile, Nurse Hazel is worried about Doc Beauty's safety so she decided to inform CPT. Lucas about her team leader's secret operation.
53	53	"PRG"	#DOTSPHPRG	December 9, 2020	13.2%	#1
After providing medical service to the PRG, Dr. Maxine becomes the hostage and asset of Bullet against the military. Due to Doc Beauty's reckless decision, Big Boss decided to secretly invade the PRG's location which is against the military protocol.
54	54	"Duda" (transl. Doubt)	#DOTSPHDuda	December 10, 2020	14.6%	#1
After a controversial rescue operation of the Alpha Team against the PRG, Dr. Maxine will now face an intense interrogation with BGEN. Carlos and COL. Garcia. What will be her sanction in Urdan?
55	55	"Moment of Truth"	#DOTSPHMomentOfTruth	December 11, 2020	14.0%	#1
Now that CPT. Lucas knows the details about the PRG's hidden location, he immediately prepares his weapons and plans a secret mission to catch Bullet. In the middle of the forest, he launches a surprise assault as he attempts to destroy the leader of the PRG before Dr. Maxine arrives to stop them from fighting.
56	56	"Alpha Team Rescue"	#DOTSPHAlphaTeamRescue	December 14, 2020	N/A	TBA
After his close encounter with his mortal enemy, CPT. Lucas let off Bullet in order to protect Dr. Maxine's feelings. Big Boss is still in awe and questions Doc Beauty's decision on hiding her connection with the former PRG leader. Will this be another reason to stop their relationship?
57	57	"Guilt"	#DOTSPHGuilt	December 15, 2020	N/A	TBA
Guilty of being the reckless medical expert in Urdan, Dr. Maxine is now willing to save CPT. Lucas's pride and dignity by exposing her connection with PRG's Bullet.
58	58	"Taking Sides"	#DOTSPHTakingSides	December 16, 2020	N/A	TBA
In order to protect CPT. Lucas, Dr. Maxine reveals her connection with Bullet and gives direction to the PRG's hidden location. As part of the military's strategy, BGEN. Defensor AFP and COL. Garcia asked Doc Beauty if she is willing to be part of the special operation against the rebels. Will she accept this risky mission?
59	59	"Caught in the Middle"	#DOTSPHCaughtInTheMiddle	December 17, 2020	N/A	TBA
Torn between two decisions, Dr. Maxine must immediately decide on accepting the role of a military asset or a PRG ally to protect her brother Bullet. Whatever her decision be, her relationship with CPT. Lucas will also come to an end.
60	60	"Bye, Lucas"	#DOTSPHByeLucas	December 18, 2020	N/A	TBA
It is a day of painful goodbyes in Urdan as Dr. Maxine bids her farewell to her brother Bullet and to her lover CPT. Lucas. While on her way to the airport, Doc Beauty gets ambushed by Pistol's rebel group.
61	61	"Hostage"	#DOTSPHHostage	December 21, 2020	N/A	TBA
Bullet, the former leader of PRG, teams up with CPT. Lucas and the Alpha Team to save Dr. Maxine. Up against a much experienced rebel and former military, will the mortal enemies be able to defeat Pistol?
62	62	"Bomb"	#DOTSPHBomb	December 22, 2020	N/A	TBA
CPT. Lucas and TSg. Diego became the casualty of a planned explosive by Pistol. As the Alpha Team begins to search for their leaders' body, they also confirmed Big Boss' and Wolf's death when their identification tags were retrieved on the restricted site.
63	63	"Never Give Up"	#DOTSPHNeverGiveUp	December 23, 2020	N/A	TBA
Following a traumatic incident in Urdan, Dr. Maxine and CPT. Moira flew back to Manila to continue their profession as doctors. While they're still waiting for a miracle, they still hope that CPT. Lucas and TSg. Diego are alive until they received the two soldiers' farewell letters.
64	64	"Surprise"	#DOTSPHSurprise	December 24, 2020	N/A	TBA
The missing Alpha Team leaders, CPT. Lucas and TSg. Diego, are both under the threatening hands of Bullet and the PRG. Surrounded by the rebels, Big Boss and Wolf both took the risk to kill the PRG members along with its leader.
65	65	"Mission Accomplished"	#DOTSPHMissionAccomplished	December 25, 2020	9.1%	#1
After a month of being held captive by the PRG, CPT. Lucas and TSg. Diego found their way back to the military camp after accomplishing their mission in Urdan. Now that everything is all set and clear, it’s time for Big Boss and Wolf to fulfill their promises for Dr. Maxine and CPT. Moira.
