= List of Strawberry Lane episodes =

Strawberry Lane is a 2014 Philippine television drama series broadcast by GMA Network. It premiered on the network's Telebabad line up from September 15, 2014 to January 2, 2015, replacing Niño.

Mega Manila ratings are provided by AGB Nielsen Philippines.

== Series overview ==
Month	Episodes	Monthly Averages
Month	Episodes	Mega Manila
September 2014	12	25.7%
October 2014	23	23.4%
November 2014	20	21.6%
December 2014	23	19.1%
January 2015	2	21.0%
Total	80	22.2%

== Episodes ==
=== September 2014 ===
Episode		Original air date	Social Media Hashtag	AGB Nielsen Mega Manila Households in Television Homes			Ref.
Episode		Original air date	Social Media Hashtag	Rating	Timeslot Rank	Primetime Rank	Ref.
1	Pilot	September 15, 2014	#StrawberryLane	28.2%	#1	#1	
2	Nasaan si Baby Amy?	September 16, 2014	#NasaanSiBabyAmy	25.6%	#1	#1	
3	A Mother's Pain	September 17, 2014	#AMothersPain	25.9%	#1	#3	
4	Ang Pagdadalaga	September 18, 2014	#AngPagdadalaga	25.7%	#1	#2	
5	Ang Bahay Bagong Pangarap	September 19, 2014	#AngBahayBagongPangarap	25.8%	#1	#4	
6	Sama-samang Mangarap	September 22, 2014	#SamaSamangMangarap	23.8%	#1	#2	
7	Hindi Inaasahang Pagkikita	September 23, 2014	#HindiInaasahangPagkikita	26.6%	#1	#1	
8	Tulungan ng Magkakaibigan	September 24, 2014	#TulunganNgMagkakaibigan	26.6%	#1	#1	
9	Test of Friendship	September 25, 2014	#TestOfFriendship	25.9%	#1	#2	
10	Ang Nawawalang Singsing	September 26, 2014	#AngNawawalangSingsing	24.5%	#1	#2	
11	Humble Hearts	September 29, 2014	#HumbleHearts	25.0%	#1	#1	
12	Compassionate Heart	September 30, 2014	#CompassionateHeart	25.3%	#1	#1	

=== October 2014 ===
Episode		Original air date	Social Media Hashtag	AGB Nielsen Mega Manila Households in Television Homes			Ref.
Episode		Original air date	Social Media Hashtag	Rating	Timeslot Rank	Primetime Rank	Ref.
13	Bagong Pag-asa	October 1, 2014	#BagongPagasa	25.8%	#1	#1	
14	Blossoming Relationships	October 2, 2014	#BlossomingRelationships	26.5%	#1	#1	
15	All About Love	October 3, 2014	#AllAboutLove	26.6%	#1	#2	
16	Family Visit	October 6, 2014	#FamilyVisit	24.1%	#1	#2	
17	Ang Pag-aalala	October 7, 2014	#AngPagAalala	24.3%	#1	#1	
18	Heavy Hearts	October 8, 2014	#HeavyHearts	25.6%	#1	#1	
19	Inaasam na Paglaya	October 9, 2014	#InaasamNaPaglaya	25.6%	#1	#1	
20	Ang Katotohanan	October 10, 2014	#AngKatotohanan	25.1%	#1	#1	
21	Ang Pagtakas	October 13, 2014	#AngPagtakas	24.6%	#1	#1	
22	Dangerous Risk	October 14, 2014	#DangerousRisk	24.0%	#1	#1	
23	Huling Hiling	October 15, 2014	#HulingHiling	25.3%	#1	#1	
24	In Deep Pain	October 16, 2014	#InDeepPain	24.7%	#1	#1	
25	Ang Pamamaalam	October 17, 2014	#AngPamamaalam	24.9%	#1	#2	
26	Muling Pagsasama	October 20, 2014	#MulingPagsasama	21.8%	#1	#2	
27	Back to the Real World	October 21, 2014	#BackToTheRealWorld	21.8%	#1	#2	
28	A New Home	October 22, 2014	#ANewHome	20.3%	#1	#3	
29	Saving the Friendship	October 23, 2014	#SavingTheFriendship	20.9%	#2	#4	
30	Threats to Happiness	October 24, 2014	#ThreatsToHappiness	21.8%	#1	#2	
31	The Secret is Out	October 27, 2014	#TheSecretIsOut	19.9%	#1	#2	
32	The Good Prevails	October 28, 2014	#TheGoodPrevails	21.7%	#1	#2	
33	True Feelings	October 29, 2014	#TrueFeelings	21.1%	#1	#2	
34	The Plan	October 30, 2014	#ThePlan	21.8%	#1	#1	
35	One for All	October 31, 2014	#OneForAll	21.0%	#1	#1	

=== November 2014 ===
Episode		Original air date	Social Media Hashtag	AGB Nielsen Mega Manila Households in Television Homes			Ref.
Episode		Original air date	Social Media Hashtag	Rating	Timeslot Rank	Primetime Rank	Ref.
36	A Day of Learning	November 3, 2014	#ADayOfLearning	23.7%	#1	#1	
37	Blaming Game	November 4, 2014	#BlamingGame	22.4%	#1	#1	
38	Unexpected Turn	November 5, 2014	#UnexpectedTurn	21.9%	#1	#1	
39	The Past Returns	November 6, 2014	#ThePastReturns	22.8%	#1	#1	
40	Nalamang Lihim	November 7, 2014	#NalamangLihim	22.6%	#1	#1	
41	Plans to Destroy	November 10, 2014	#PlansToDestroy	24.5%	#1	#1	
42	Turn of Events	November 11, 2014	#TurnOfEvents	23.1%	#1	#1	
43	Walang Iwanan	November 12, 2014	#WalangIwanan	22.7%	#1	#1	
44	Bad Karma	November 13, 2014	#BadKarma	23.0%	#1	#1	
45	I'm here for you	November 14, 2014	#ImHereForYou	22.8%	#1	#1	
46	Unexpected Turn	November 17, 2014	#UnexpectedTurn	20.4%	#2	#4	
47	Ang Pagbibintang	November 18, 2014	#AngPagbibintang	19.8%	#2	#4	
48	Sa Kabila ng Pagsubok	November 19, 2014	#SaKabilaNgPagsubok	21.0%	#2	#3	
49	Lahat ay Kakayanin	November 20, 2014	#LahatAyKakayanin	20.3%	#2	#6	
50	Clarissa, don't give up!	November 21, 2014	#ClarissaDontGiveUp	19.2%	#2	#6	
51	Facing Challenges	November 24, 2014	#FacingChallenges	19.4%	#2	#5	
52	The Forgiveness	November 25, 2014	#TheForgiveness	19.7%	#2	#7	
53	Accidental Surprise	November 26, 2014	#AccidentalSurprise	20.1%	#2	#3	
54	Strange Situation	November 27, 2014	#StrangeSituation	21.7%	#2	#3	
55	Warm Welcome	November 28, 2014	#WarmWelcome	21.5%	#2	#2	

=== December 2014 ===
Episode		Original air date	Social Media Hashtag	AGB Nielsen Mega Manila Households in Television Homes			Ref.
Episode		Original air date	Social Media Hashtag	Rating	Timeslot Rank	Primetime Rank	Ref.
56	The Mystery	December 1, 2014	#TheMystery	19.1%	#2	#6	
57	Real Purpose	December 2, 2014	#RealPurpose	17.4%	#2	#7	
58	The Danger Ahead	December 3, 2014	#TheDangerAhead	16.7%	#2	#7	
59	Planong Pagsira	December 4, 2014	#PlanongPagsira	19.0%	#2	#7	
60	The Confrontation	December 5, 2014	#TheConfrontation	18.6%	#2	#6	
61	Ang Paninindigan	December 8, 2014	#AngPaninindigan	21.2%	#2	#6	
62	Family Under Trials	December 9, 2014	#FamilyUnderTrials	20.5%	#1	#6	
63	A Mother's Instinct	December 10, 2014	#AMothersInstinct	21.8%	#2	#3	
64	Tinatagong Lihim	December 11, 2014	#TinatagongLihim	21.6%	#2	#3	
65	Painful Discovery	December 12, 2014	#PainfulDiscovery	21.0%	#1	#2	
66	The Truth	December 15, 2014	#TheTruth	20.0%	#2	#3	
67	The Real Victim	December 16, 2014	#TheRealVictim	18.5%	#2	#4	
68	At Their Mercy	December 17, 2014	#AtTheirMercy	18.4%	#2	#4	
69	New Hope	December 18, 2014	#NewHope	19.9%	#2	#3	
70	Deadly Plans	December 19, 2014	#DeadlyPlans	18.2%	#2	#4	
71	In Danger	December 22, 2014	#InDanger	18.3%	#2	#4	
72	Tunay na Maysala	December 23, 2014	#TunayNaMaySala	19.1%	#1	#3	
73	Hope in Love	December 24, 2014	#StrawberryLane	18.5%	#1	#2	
74	Reunited	December 25, 2014	#Reunited	18.7%	#1	#2	
75	It's Not Over	December 26, 2014	#ItsNotOver	20.5%	#1	#2	
76	Monique's Revenge	December 29, 2014	#StrawberryLane	20.4%	#1	#2	
77	Abducted	December 30, 2014	#StrawberryLane	19.5%	#1	#2	
78	Finding Forgiveness	December 31, 2014	#FindingForgiveness	14.1%	#1	#4	

=== January 2015 ===
Episode		Original air date	Social Media Hashtag	AGB Nielsen Mega Manila Households in Television Homes			Ref.
Episode		Original air date	Social Media Hashtag	Rating	Timeslot Rank	Primetime Rank	Ref.
79	Risky Plan	January 1, 2015	#StrawberryLane	19.2%	#1	#2	
80	Finale	January 2, 2015	#StrawberryLaneFinale	22.7%	#1	#1	
