= Kim Rodriguez =

Filipino actress and model (born 1994)

- Born: Kim Jerami Empasis Rebadulla; August 14, 1994 (age 32); Marikina, Metro Manila, Philippines
- Other names: Kim, Eliana, Jacqueline, Claire, Xandra, Sofia
- Occupations: Actress, model, singer
- Years active: 2011–present
- Agents: Sparkle (2011–2022); Ogie Diaz Talents (2022–present)
- Notable work: Kakambal ni Eliana; Strawberry Lane; Hanggang Makita Kang Muli; Mars Ravelo's Darna; Nag-aapoy na Damdamin
- Height: 5 ft 5 in (165 cm) to 5 ft 8 in

Kim Jerami Empasis Rebadulla, known professionally as Kim Rodriguez (Tagalog pronunciation: [ɾoˈdɾigɛs]; born August 14, 1994) is a Filipino actress and model known for her role in Kakambal ni Eliana as a girl with a twin snake and in Strawberry Lane where she played a boyish girl who got sent to a rehabilitation center for youth offenders.

== Early life and background ==
Rodriguez was born Kim Jerami Empasis Rebadulla on August 14, 1994, and was born and raised in Concepcion, Marikina. Her parents separated when she was young. According to Rodriguez, she had the utmost affection for her grandmother, of whom she took care when she suffered a stroke and with whom she shared a passion in acting. Her grandmother died of natural causes in 2009, at the age of 73.

== Acting career ==
Rodriguez began her career performing as an extra on television shows. She got her first role in the teen-oriented show Reel Love Presents Tween Hearts in GMA Network.

In 2011, she played the role of Lourdes in the television series called Sinner or Saint which she got paired up with Derrick Monasterio which is also a part of Tween Hearts.

In 2012, she appeared in her very first film appearance in the movie called Mga Mumunting Lihim produced by Joey Abacan of GMA Pictures which stars Judy Ann Santos and Iza Calzado where she won as New Movie Actress of the Year in the 29th PMPC Star Awards for Movies. After her film debut she got cast in the Philippine remake of the high-rated Korean drama Coffee Prince, in which she played the younger sister of Kris Bernal and the girlfriend of Sef Cadayona.

In 2013, she was given her very first big break via Kakambal ni Eliana, where she played the lead role Eliana, a girl with a twin snake. She was paired up with her co-star in Reel Love Presents Tween Hearts Kristofer Martin.

In 2014, she reunited with her Kakambal ni Eliana leading man Kristofer Martin in Paraiso Ko'y Ikaw. In the same year, she was cast as one of the lead roles in Strawberry Lane a story of four teenage girls who form an unlikely bond in a detention centre for youth offenders where they build up a strawberry lane as a reminder of their unending friendship. She is paired with Kiko Estrada.

As of 2022, Rodriguez is now a freelance actress. Her career is currently being managed by Ogie Diaz talent. Diaz's roster of talents can both appear on Kapamilya Channel, ALLTV2 and GMA Network. In 2026, she was part of the 20 contestants (dubbed lucky stars) in the ABS-CBN game show Kapamilya Deal or No Deal, where she was selected to play on the episode aired July 26. Her briefcase contained the ₱1 million grand prize, but she sold it for ₱170,500 late in the game, thus missing out on becoming the first grand prize winner of the 2026 revival.

== Other ventures ==
=== Vitara Biomedical ===
Serves as the President and CEO (appointed November 2024), where she leads the development of a specialized life-support system designed to mimic the womb and improve outcomes for premature infants.

=== Board Memberships ===
She currently serves as the Board Chair for Freyja Healthcare and Del Sol Solutions, and sits on the board of the Medical Device Manufacturing Association (MDMA).

=== Military Service ===
Outside of entertainment and business, she serves as a Philippine Navy Reservist

== Acting credits ==
=== Film ===
Key
†	Denotes films that have not yet been released

Kim Rodriguez's film credits with year of release, film titles and roles
Year	Title	Role	Ref.
2012	Oros	Daisy	
2012	Mga Mumunting Lihim	Mae	
2013	Chasing Boulevards	Kim	
2013	Ano ang Kulay ng mga Nakalimutang Pangarap	Teresa (youth)	
2017	Kaibigan	Princess	
2017	This Time I'll Be Sweeter	Katherine Ann "Katie" Luna	
2025	How To Get Away From My Toxic Family	Helen	
2026	Batang Paco		

=== Television ===
Key
†	Denotes shows that have not yet been aired

Kim Rodriguez's television credits with year of release, title(s) and role
Year	Title	Role	Notes	Ref.
2011	Reel Love Presents Tween Hearts	Angela "Angel" Villavicencio		
2011	Sinner or Saint	Lourdes	Credited as Kim Komatsu	
2012	Biritera	Gwendolyn		
2012	Coffee Prince	Mylene Gomez	Credited as Kim Komatsu	
2013	Kakambal ni Eliana	Eliana Cascavel-Dominguez		
2014	Paraiso Ko'y Ikaw	Josephine Enriquez-Rodrigo / Ariella Estrella		
2014	Magpakailanman	Reyshan	Episode: "Sa Bangin ng Kabataan"	
2014	Strawberry Lane	Jacqueline "Jack" Perez-Morales		
2015	My Mother's Secret	Nerissa "Neri" Macapugay Pastor-Guevarra		
2015	Wagas	Ferdes	Episode: "Danny & Fredes Love Story"	
2015	Karelasyon	Jane	Episode: "Utol"	
2015	Magpakailanman	Lynette	Episode: "Preggy prosti: Ang totoong kuwento ni Lynette"	
2015	Magpakailanman	Nida	Episode: "Binihag na Kasambahay"	
2015	Juan Tamad	Diw Diwata		
2016	Buena Familia	Misha		
2016	Hanggang Makita Kang Muli	Claire Sandoval-Esguerra		
2016	Magpakailanman	Jane	Episode: "You and Me Against the World"	
2016	Juan Tamad	Diw Diwata		
2016	Karelasyon	Liv Chavez	Episode: "Reyna"	
2016	Karelasyon	Jenny	Episode: "Bonus"	
2017	Pinulot Ka Lang sa Lupa	Julie		
2017	Destined to be Yours	Fiona		
2017	Road Trip			
2017	Wagas	Sarah	Episode: "Demon vs Angel"	
2017	Wagas	Isabel Granada	Episode: "Ang wagas na pag-ibig ni Arnel Cowley para kay Isabel Granada"	
2017	G.R.I.N.D. Get Ready It's a New Day	Catherine / Cathy		
2018	Haplos	Olga Maglalim		
2018	Inday Will Always Love You	Ericka Ferraren		
2018	Wagas	Daniela	Episode: "Ang Karibal"	
2018	Ika-5 Utos	Roxanne		
2019	Dear Uge	KC	Episode: "Jas Got Lucky"	
2019	Magpakailanman	April	Episode: "Huwag ate, Huwag bayaw"	
2019	Wagas	young Milet	Episode: "The Wedding Gift"	
2019	Tadhana	Michelle	Episode: "Boss Karyoka"	
2020	Descendants of the Sun	Denise		
2021	The Lost Recipe	Dulce		
2021	Stories from the Heart	Lily Pelaez	Episode: "Never Say Goodbye"	
2021	Tadhana	Glaiza	Episode: "Daddy's Gurl"	
2021	Tadhana	Maricar	Episode: "Tres Marias"	
2022	ABS-CBN Christmas Special 2022	Herself		
2022	Mars Ravelo's Darna	Xandra / Ishna		
2023	Love Bites	Kath	Episode: "Wedding Dress"	
2023	Fractured	Cindy dela Vega		
2023	Nag-aapoy na Damdamin	Sofia Serrano-Salazar		
2023	ASAP Natin 'To	Herself	Guest performer and co-host	
2024	FPJ's Batang Quiapo	Jelly		
2026	Kapamilya Deal or No Deal	Contestant/Lucky Star	Briefcase No. 19	

=== Music video appearances ===
Year	Title	Artist	Ref.
2025	"Magkaibang Mundo"	Angelo Miguel	

== Accolades ==
Awards and NominationsAwards and nominations received by Paulo Avelino
Award	Year	Category	Nominated work	Result	Ref.
2011	25th PMPC Star Awards for Television	Best New Female Television Personality	Tween Hearts	Nominated	
2013	29th PMPC Star Awards for Movies	New Movie Actress of the Year	Mga Mumunting Lihim	Won	
2015	2015 FAMAS Awards	German Moreno Youth Achievement Award	Herself	Won	
2021	Korea Entertainment Star Sharing Volunteer Contribution Awards	Filipina Celebrity Influencer	Herself	Won	
2022	6th Outstanding Men and Women of the Philippines.	Female Star of the Year	Herself	Won	
