= List of Ika-5 Utos episodes =

Ika-5 Utos (Lit: Fifth Commandment / English: Revenge) is a 2018 Philippine drama television series starring Jean Garcia, Valerie Concepcion and Gelli de Belen. The series premiered on GMA Network's GMA Afternoon Prime block and worldwide on GMA Pinoy TV from September 10, 2018 to February 8, 2019, replacing Contessa.

NUTAM (Nationwide Urban Television Audience Measurement) People in Television Homes ratings are provided by AGB Nielsen Philippines. The series ended, but its the 18th-week run, and with 116 episodes. It was replaced by Inagaw na Bituin.

== Series overview ==
Month	Episodes	Monthly averages
Month	Episodes	NUTAM
September 2018	18	5.4%
October 2018	28	5.4%
November 2018	22	6.0%
December 2018	21	
January 2019	23	
February 2019	6	5.9%

== Episodes ==
=== September 2018 ===
Episode		Original air date	Social media hashtag	AGB Nielsen NUTAM People in Television Homes			Ref.
Episode		Original air date	Social media hashtag	Rating	Timeslot rank	Whole day rank	Ref.
1	"Pilot"	Monday, September 10, 2018	#Ika5Utos	5.7%	#1	#12	
2	"Buking" (Seen)	Tuesday, September 11, 2018	#ILUBuking	5.7%	#1	#12	
3	"Kutob" (Heartbeat)	Wednesday, September 12, 2018	#ILUKutob	5.6%	#1	#13	
4	"Patty"	Thursday, September 13, 2018	#ILUPatty	6.1%	#1	#13	
5	"Luksa" (Mourn)	Friday, September 14, 2018	#ILULuksa	7.3%	#1	#13	
6	"Patawad" (Forgiveness)	Saturday, September 15, 2018	#ILUPatawad	7.2%	#1	#12	
7	"Lihim" (Secret)	Monday, September 17, 2018	#ILULihim	5.3%	#2	#16	
8	"Ganti" (Revenge)	Tuesday, September 18, 2018	#ILUGanti	5.5%	#2	#12	
9	"Ligtas" (Safe)	Wednesday, September 19, 2018	#ILULigtas	5.0%	#2	#14	
10	"Hiwalay" (Separate)	Thursday, September 20, 2018	#ILUHiwalay	5.1%	#2	#16	
11	"Bangon" (Redemption)	Friday, September 21, 2018	#ILUBangon	5.0%	#2	#17	
12	"Engkwentro" (Encounter)	Saturday, September 22, 2018	#ILUEngkwentro	5.1%	#2	#16	
13	"Ligaw" (Stray)	Monday, September 24, 2018	#ILULigaw	4.9%	#2	#14	
14	"Iwas" (Avoid)	Tuesday, September 25, 2018	#ILUIwas	4.8%	#2	#16	
15	"Selos" (Envy)	Wednesday, September 26, 2018	#ILUSelos	3.9%	#2	#18	
16	"Pagkikita" (Meeting)	Thursday, September 27, 2018	#ILUPagkikita	5.0%	#2	#17	
17	"Engaged"	Friday, September 28, 2018	#ILUEngaged	5.1%	#2		
18	"Hazing"	Saturday, September 29, 2018	#ILUHazing	5.2%	#2	#15	

=== October 2018 ===
Episode		Original air date	Social media hashtag	AGB Nielsen NUTAM People in Television Homes			Ref.
Episode		Original air date	Social media hashtag	Rating	Timeslot rank	Whole day rank	Ref.
19	"Tulong" (Help)	Monday, October 1, 2018	#ILUTulong	3.9%	#2		
20	"Suspect"	Tuesday, October 2, 2018	#ILUSuspect	4.0%	#2		
21	"Takip" (Cover)	Wednesday, October 3, 2018	#ILUTakip	3.9%	#2		
22	"Usig" (Investigate)	Thursday, October 4, 2018	#ILUUsig	4.1%	#2		
23	"Bawi" (Recover)	Friday, October 5, 2018	#ILUBawi	4.3%	#2		
24	"Tago" (Hide)	Saturday, October 6, 2018	#ILUTago	5.4%	#2		
25	"Bisto" (Caught)	Monday, October 8, 2018	#ILUBisto	5.5%	#2		
26	"Kumpisal" (Confession)	Tuesday, October 9, 2018	#ILUKumpisal	5.3%	#2		
27	"Takas" (Escape)	Wednesday, October 10, 2018	#ILUTakas	5.0%	#2		
28	"Pakiusap" (Please)	Thursday, October 11, 2018	#ILUPakiusap	4.5%	#2		
29	"Away" (Fight)	Friday, October 12, 2018	#ILUAway	4.2%	#2		
30	"Hinala" (Suspicion)	Saturday, October 13, 2018	#ILUHinala	4.0%	#2		
31	"Pabor" (Favor)	Monday, October 15, 2018	#ILUPabor	4.8%	#1		
32	"Rambol" (Rumble)	Tuesday, October 16, 2018	#ILURambol	5.6%	#1		
33	"Silakbo" (Running Out)	Wednesday, October 17, 2018	#ILUSilakbo	5.8%	#2		
34	"Huli" (Caught)	Thursday, October 18, 2018	#ILUHuli	5.6%	#2		
35	"Ligpit" (Stable)	Friday, October 19, 2018	#ILULigpit	5.2%	#2	#17	
36	"Misteryosa" (Mysterious)	Saturday, October 20, 2018	#ILUMisteryosa	6.0%	#1		
37	"Bistado" (Seen)	Monday, October 22, 2018	#ILUBistado	6.1%	#1	#14	
38	"Sabotahe" (Sabotage)	Tuesday, October 23, 2018	#ILUSabotahe	6.1%	#1		
39	"Sukol" (Defiance)	Wednesday, October 24, 2018	#ILUSukol	6.2%	#1		
40	"The Truth"	Thursday, October 25, 2018	#ILUTheTruth	6.4%	#1		
41	"Pag-amin" (Confession)	Friday, October 26, 2018	#ILUPagAmin	6.5%	#1		
42	"Takas" (Escape)	Monday, October 29, 2018	#ILUTakas	6.7%	#1		
43	"Testigo" (Witness)	Tuesday, October 30, 2018	#ILUTestigo	7.9%	#1		
44	"Hostage"	Wednesday, October 31, 2018	#ILUHostage	7.5%	#1		

=== November 2018 ===
Episode		Original air date	Social media hashtag	AGB Nielsen NUTAM People in Television Homes			Ref.
Episode		Original air date	Social media hashtag	Rating	Timeslot rank	Whole day rank	Ref.
45	"Proposal"	November 1, 2018	#ILUProposal	6.0%	#1		
46	"Engagement"	November 2, 2018	#ILUEngagement	5.5%	#2		
47	"Habol" (Chase)	November 5, 2018	#ILUHabulan	6.2%	#1		
48	"Giyera" (War)	November 6, 2018	#ILUGiyera	5.9%	#2		
49	"Patol" (Brawl)	November 7, 2018	#ILUPatol	6.0%	#1		
50	"Target"	November 8, 2018	#ILUTarget	5.8%	#2		
51	"Sagip" (Save)	November 9, 2018	#ILUSagip	6.4%	#1		
52	"Tangka" (Attempt)	November 12, 2018	#ILUTangka	6.3%	#2		
53	"Memory"	November 13, 2018	#ILUMemory	6.1%	#2		
54	"Liar"	November 14, 2018	#ILULiar	6.2%	#1		
55	"Buntis" (Pregnant)	November 15, 2018	#ILUBuntis	6.0%	#2		
56	"Kasal" (Wedding)	November 16, 2018	#ILUKasal	6.4%	#1		
57	"Bunyag" (Reveal)	November 19, 2018	#ILUBunyag	6.3%	#1		
58	"Panganib" (Danger)	November 20, 2018	#ILUPanganib	6.2%	#2		
59	"Sabunutan" (Fight)	November 21, 2018	#ILUSabunutan	6.2%	#1		
60	"Baby"	November 22, 2018	#ILUBaby	6.1%	#1		
61	"Ex"	November 23, 2018	#ILUEx	5.6%	#1		
62	"Sakal" (Choke)	November 26, 2018	#ILUSakal	5.9%	#2		
63	"Beshie"	November 27, 2018	#ILUBeshie	6.2%	#1		
64	"Ninang" (Godmother)	November 28, 2018	#ILUNinang	5.7%	#1		
65	"Tago" (Hide)	November 29, 2018	#ILUTago	6.0%	#1		
66	"Banta" (Threat)	November 30, 2018	#ILUBanta	5.8%	#2		

=== December 2018 ===
Episode		Original air date	Social media hashtag	AGB Nielsen NUTAM People in Television Homes			Ref.
Episode		Original air date	Social media hashtag	Rating	Timeslot rank	Whole day rank	Ref.
67	"Tangka" (Attempt)	December 3, 2018	#ILUTangka	5.5%	#1		
68	"Break Up"	December 4, 2018	#ILUBreakUp	5.7%	#1		
69	"Binyag" (Christening)	December 5, 2018	#ILUBinyag	5.4%	#2		
70	"Desperada" (Desperate)	December 6, 2018	#ILUDesperada	6.0%	#1		
71	"Huli" (Caught)	December 7, 2018	#ILUHuli	5.9%	#1		
72	"Simbang Gabi" (Night Mass)	December 10, 2018	#ILUSimbangGabi	6.2%	#1		
73	"Tutok" (Point)	December 11, 2018	#ILUTutok	5.7%	#1		
74	"Takbo" (Run)	December 12, 2018	#ILUTakbo	6.4%	#1		
75	"Tanan" (Elopement)	December 13, 2018	#ILUTanan	6.0%	#1		
76	"Salakay" (Raid)	December 14, 2018	#ILUSalakay	5.7%	#1		
77	"Habol" (Catch)	December 17, 2018	#ILUHabol				
78	"Ahon" (Going Up)	December 18, 2018	#ILUAhon				
79	"Rescue"	December 19, 2018	#ILURescue				
80	"Dukot" (Kidnap)	December 20, 2018	#ILUDukot				
81	"Kulong" (Jail)	December 21, 2018	#ILUKulong	6.3%	#1		
82	"Takas" (Escape)	December 24, 2018	#ILUTakas				
83	"Sikreto" (Secret)	December 25, 2018	#ILUSikreto				
84	"Savior"	December 26, 2018	#ILUSavior	6.0%	#1		
85	"Takas" (Escape)	December 27, 2018	#ILUTakas				
86	"Danger"	December 28, 2018	#ILUDanger				
87	"Ligpit" (Clean-Up)	December 31, 2018	#ILULigpit				

=== January 2019 ===
Episode		Original air date	Social media hashtag	AGB Nielsen NUTAM People in Television Homes			Ref.
Episode		Original air date	Social media hashtag	Rating	Timeslot rank	Whole day rank	Ref.
88	"Guilty"	January 1, 2019	#ILUGuilty				
89	"Suko" (Surrender)	January 2, 2019	#ILUSuko				
90	"Traydor" (Traitor)	January 3, 2019	#ILUTraydor				
91	"Sagasa" (Bump)	January 4, 2019	#ILUSagasa				
92	"Bangin" (Creek)	January 7, 2019	#ILUBangin	6.0%	#1		
93	"Saboy" (Splash)	January 8, 2019	#ILUSaboy				
94	"Alive"	January 9, 2019	#ILUAlive				
95	"Chaka"	January 10, 2019	#ILUChaka				
96	"First Birthday"	January 11, 2019	#ILUFirstBirthday				
97	"Away" (Fight)	January 14, 2019	#ILUAway	5.6%	#1		
98	"Goodbye"	January 15, 2019	#ILUGoodbye				
99	"Salarin" (Culprit)	January 16, 2019	#ILUSalarin				
100	"Usig" (Investigate)	January 17, 2019	#ILUUsig				
101	"Iwas" (Avoid)	January 18, 2019	#ILUIwas	6.2%	#1		
102	"Wedding Ring"	January 21, 2019	#ILUWeddingRing				
103	"Confession"	January 22, 2019	#ILUConfession				
104	"Sabog" (Blast)	January 23, 2019	#ILUSabog				
105	"Bulgar" (Vulgar)	January 24, 2019	#ILUBulgar				
106	"Kaso" (Case)	January 25, 2019	#ILUKaso				
107	"Utos" (Order)	January 28, 2019	#ILUUtos	5.7%	#2		
108	"Banta" (Threat)	January 29, 2019	#ILUBanta				
109	"Target"	January 30, 2019	#ILUTarget				
110	"Habol" (Chase)	January 31, 2019	#ILUHabol				

=== February 2019 ===
Episode		Original air date	Social media hashtag	AGB Nielsen NUTAM People in Television Homes			Ref.
Episode		Original air date	Social media hashtag	Rating	Timeslot rank	Whole day rank	Ref.
111	"Tunggali" (Conflict)	February 1, 2019	#ILUTunggali	5.7%	#1		
112	"Trap"	February 4, 2019	#ILUTrap	5.8%	#1		
113	"Kagat" (Bite)	February 5, 2019	#ILUKagat	5.5%	#1		
114	"Thirdy"	February 6, 2019	#ILUThirdy	6.0%	#1		
115	"'Wag Kang Papatay" (Don't Kill)	February 7, 2019	#ILUWagKangPapatay	6.2%	#1		
116	"The Shocking Finale"	February 8, 2019	#ILUTheShockingFinale	6.0%	#2	#14	
