= List of Sa Piling ni Nanay episodes =

Episodes of Philippine television drama series

Sa Piling ni Nanay is a 2016 Philippine television drama series broadcast by GMA Network. It premiered on the network's Afternoon Prime line up and worldwide via GMA Pinoy TV from June 27, 2016 to January 27, 2017, replacing The Millionaire's Wife.

Mega Manila, Urban Luzon, and NUTAM (Nationwide Urban Television Audience Measurement) ratings are provided by AGB Nielsen Philippines.

== Series overview ==
Month	Episodes	
Month	Episodes	Monthly Averages
June 2016	4	15.4%
July 2016	20	12.9%
August 2016	23	13.2%
September 2016	22	14.0%
October 2016	21	14.1%
November 2016	22	13.3%
December 2016	22	12.5%
January 2017	20	12.2%
Total	154	13.5%

== Episodes ==
=== June 2016 ===
Episode		Original air date	Social Media Hashtag	AGB Nielsen Mega Manila		Ref.
Episode		Original air date	Social Media Hashtag	Rating	Timeslot Rank	Ref.
1	Pilot	June 27, 2016	#SaPilingNiNanay	15.4%	#1	
2	Losing Maymay	June 28, 2016	#SPNLosingMayMay	14.8%	#1	
3	Ysabel's Baby	June 29, 2016	#SPNYsabelsBaby	16.1%	#1	
4	Change of Heart	June 30, 2016	#SPNChangeOfHeart	15.1%	#1	

=== July 2016 ===
Episode		Original air date	Social Media Hashtag	AGB Nielsen Urban Luzon		Ref.
Episode		Original air date	Social Media Hashtag	Rating	Timeslot Rank	Ref.
5	Manhunt	July 1, 2016	#SPNManhunt	14.4%	#1	
6	Buhay Isla	July 4, 2016	#SPNBuhayIsla	13.6%	#1	
7	Pananakot ni Rod	July 5, 2016	#SPNPananakotNiRod	14.1%	#1	
8	Help Ysabel	July 6, 2016	#SPNHelpYsabel	12.9%	#1	
9	Pagtakas	July 7, 2016	#SPNPagtakas	14.0%	#1	
10	Back to Hell	July 8, 2016	#SPNBackToHell	14.9%	#1	
11	Almost Free	July 11, 2016	#SPNAlmostFree	14.4%	#1	
12	Bihag	July 12, 2016	#SPNBihag	14.1%	#1	
13	Pagpapanggap	July 13, 2016	#SPNPagpapanggap	13.4%	#1	
14	Duda ni Rod	July 14, 2016	#SPNDudaNiRod	15.0%	#1	
15	Escape Plan	July 15, 2016	#SPNEscapePlan	13.2%	#1	
16	Motibo ni Rod	July 18, 2016	#SPNMotiboNiRod	12.1%	#2	
17	Tuloy na Takas	July 19, 2016	#SPNTuloyNaTakas	11.1%	#2	
18	Kalayaan	July 20, 2016	#SPNKalayaan	11.7%	#2	
19	Nawawala si Maya	July 21, 2016	#SPNNawawalaSiMaya	11.9%	#2	
20	Kapit sa Patalim	July 22, 2016	#SPNKapitSaPatalim	13.2%	#1	
21	Walang Kawala	July 26, 2016 (Note: Episode 21 did not air on July 25 during the 2016 State of the Nation Address live coverage.)	#SPNWalangKawala	10.7%	#2	
22	Paghihiwalay	July 27, 2016	#SPNPaghihiwalay	11.1%	#2	
23	Paglayo	July 28, 2016	#SPNPaglayo	10.7%	#2	
24	Pagbawi	July 29, 2016	#SPNPagbawi	11.0%	#2	

=== August 2016 ===
Episode		Original air date	Social Media Hashtag	AGB Nielsen Urban Luzon		Ref.
Episode		Original air date	Social Media Hashtag	Rating	Timeslot Rank	Ref.
25	Surrogacy	August 1, 2016	#SPNSurrogacy	12.7%	#1	
26	Pangamba ni Scarlet	August 2, 2016	#SPNPangambaNiScarlet	12.2%	#2	
27	Buwis-buhay	August 3, 2016	#SPNBuwisBuhay	12.2%	#1	
28	Ganti ni Scarlet	August 4, 2016	#SPNGantiNiScarlet	11.9%	#2	
29	Pangungulila ni Maya	August 5, 2016	#SPNPangungulilaNiMaya	12.1%	#1	
30	Kasamaan ni Scarlet	August 8, 2016	#SPNKasamaanNiScarlet	12.0%	#2	
31	Huwad na Ina	August 9, 2016	#SPNHuwadNaIna	13.7%	#2	
32	Pagtakas ni Maya	August 10, 2016	#SPNPagtakasNiMaya	12.4%	#2	
33	Maya is Safe	August 11, 2016	#SPNMayaIsSafe	14.0%	#1	
34	Kakampi si Jonas	August 12, 2016	#SPNKakampiSiJonas	15.3%	#1	
35	Huli sa Akto	August 15, 2016	#SPNHuliSaAkto	13.4%	#1	
36	Bagong Kasunduan	August 16, 2016	#SPNBagongKasunduan	14.3%	#1	
37	Pagpapaubaya	August 17, 2016	#SPNPagpapaubaya	14.3%	#1	
38	Napipintong Panganib	August 18, 2016	#SPNNapipintongPanganib	13.6%	#1	
39	Nakidnap si Maya	August 19, 2016	#SPNNakidnapSiMaya	13.2%	#1	
40	Pakana ni Scarlet	August 22, 2016	#SPNPakanaNiScarlet	13.2%	#1	
41	Sino si Benedict?	August 23, 2016	#SPNSinoSiBenedict	12.1%	#1	
42	Pagtumba kay Ysabel	August 24, 2016	#SPNPagtumbaKayYsabel	13.3%	#1	
43	Bagong Kaibigan	August 25, 2016	#SPNBagongKaibigan	12.9%	#1	
44	Pagbangon ni Ysabel	August 26, 2016	#SPNPagbangonNiYsabel	15.2%	#1	
45	Bagong Ysabel	August 29, 2016	#SPNBagongYsabel	13.5%	#1	
46	Destiny to Meet	August 30, 2016	#SaPilingNiNanay	—N/a		
47	Multo ng Kahapon	August 31, 2016	#SPNMultoNgKahapon	13.3%	#1	

=== September 2016 ===
Episode		Original air date	Social Media Hashtag	AGB Nielsen Urban Luzon		Ref.
Episode		Original air date	Social Media Hashtag	Rating	Timeslot Rank	Ref.
48	Nalalapit na Paghaharap	September 1, 2016	#SPNNalalapitNaPaghaharap	12.8%	#2	
49	Paranoid	September 2, 2016	#SPNParanoid	13.8%	#2	
50	Ebidensya ni Ysabel	September 5, 2016	#SPNEbidensyaNiYsabel	13.5%	#1	
51	Benedict's Game	September 6, 2016	#SaPilingNiNanay	14.2%	#1	
52	Auction	September 7, 2016	#SPNAuction	13.7%	#1	
53	The Accident	September 8, 2016	#SPNTheAccident	15.1%	#1	
54	Paninisi	September 9, 2016	#SPNPaninisi	14.7%	#1	
55	Kutob ni Scarlet	September 12, 2016	#SPNKutobNiScarlet	12.2%	#1	
56	Duda	September 13, 2016	#SPNDuda	12.8%	#1	
57	Hamunan	September 14, 2016	#SPNHamunan	15.0%	#1	
58	Kutob ni Matilda	September 15, 2016	#SPNKutobNiMatilda	13.0%	#1	
59	Buking ni Scarlet	September 16, 2016	#SPNBukingNiScarlet	13.9%	#1	
60	Ebidensya ni Matilda	September 19, 2016	#SPNEbidensyaNiMatilda	14.4%	#1	
61	Tunay na Dahilan	September 20, 2016	#SPNTunayNaDahilan	12.6%	#1	
62	Krimen ni Scarlet	September 21, 2016	#SPNKrimenNiScarlet	14.0%	#1	
63	Saved by Ysabel	September 22, 2016	#SPNSavedByYsabel	13.5%	#1	
64	Runaway Child	September 23, 2016	#SPNRunawayChild	14.6%	#1	
65	Pagsasamang Muli	September 26, 2016	#SPNPagsasamangMuli	13.8%	#1	
66	Healing	September 27, 2016	#SPNHealing	13.3%	#1	
67	Hadlang sa Mag-ina	September 28, 2016	#SPNHadlangSaMagIna	15.6%	#1	
68	Paghihigpit	September 29, 2016	#SPNPaghihigpit	15.6%	#1	
69	Suspetsa ni Katherine	September 30, 2016	#SPNSuspetsaNiKatherine	13.8%	#1	

=== October 2016 ===
Episode		Original air date	Social Media Hashtag	AGB Nielsen Urban Luzon		Ref.
Episode		Original air date	Social Media Hashtag	Rating	Timeslot Rank	Ref.
70	Katherine's Birthday	October 3, 2016	#SaPilingNiNanay	13.2%	#1	
71	Pagkilos ni Katherine	October 4, 2016	#SPNPagkilosNiKatherine	15.5%	#1	
72	Sumbat ni Scarlet	October 5, 2016	#SPNSumbatNiScarlet	14.1%	#1	
73	Maling Hinala	October 6, 2016	#SPNMalingHinala	15.3%	#1	
74	Bagong Pag-asa	October 7, 2016	#SPNBagongPagAsa	15.1%	#1	
75	Panic Mode	October 10, 2016	#SPNPanicMode	13.2%	#1	
76	Guilty Scarlet	October 11, 2016	#SPNGuiltyScarlet	14.0%	#1	
77	Santa Santita	October 12, 2016	#SPNSantaSantita	16.5%	#1	
78	Panibagong Paninira	October 13, 2016	#SPNPanibagongPaninira	14.3%	#1	
79	Maling Paratang	October 14, 2016	#SPNMalingParatang	13.1%	#1	
80	Plano ni Jonas	October 17, 2016	#SPNPlanoNiJonas	14.6%	#1	
81	Sumbat	October 18, 2016	#SPNSumbat	13.4%	#1	
82	Suspect	October 19, 2016	#SPNSuspect	14.6%	#1	
83	Frame up	October 20, 2016	#SPNFrameUp	16.5%	#1	
84	Sabotahe	October 21, 2016	#SPNSabotahe	14.6%	#1	
85	Suspetsa ni Benedict	October 24, 2016	#SPNSuspetsaNiBenedict	12.9%	#1	
86	Biktima	October 25, 2016	#SPNBiktima	12.7%	#1	
87	Inosente	October 26, 2016	#SPNInosente	14.2%	#1	
88	Angas ni Scarlet	October 27, 2016	#SPNAngasNiScarlet	14.2%	#1	
89	The Deal	October 28, 2016	#SPNTheDeal	13.3%	#1	
90	Panlalason sa Isip	October 31, 2016	#SPNPanlalasonSaIsip	10.9%	#1	

=== November 2016 ===
Episode		Original air date	Social Media Hashtag	AGB Nielsen Urban Luzon		Ref.
Episode		Original air date	Social Media Hashtag	Rating	Timeslot Rank	Ref.
91	Katherine vs. Ysabel	November 1, 2016	#SPNKatherineVsYsabel	11.7%	#1	
92	Failed Escape	November 2, 2016	#SPNFailedEscape	16.2%	#1	
93	Kriminal	November 3, 2016	#SPNKriminal	13.8%	#1	
94	Bilanggo	November 4, 2016	#SPNBilanggo	15.5%	#1	
95	Pangako ni Benedict	November 7, 2016	#SPNPangakoNiBenedict	13.2%	#1	
96	Pamamaalam	November 8, 2016	#SPNPamamaalam	11.6%	#1	
97	Lihim na Kaaway	November 9, 2016	#SPNLihimNaKaaway	12.3%	#1	
98	Kaguluhan sa Kulungan	November 10, 2016	#SPNKaguluhanSaKulungan	13.3%	#1	
99	Panganib	November 11, 2016	#SPNPanganib	12.7%	#1	
100	Karamay	November 14, 2016	#SPNKaramay	13.3%	#1	
101	Parusa	November 15, 2016	#SPNParusa	14.5%	#1	
102	Pangalawang Buhay	November 16, 2016	#SPNPangalawangBuhay	14.8%	#1	
103	Wedding Conspiracy	November 17, 2016	#SaPilingNiNanay	13.9%	#1	
104	Karma ni Scarlet	November 18, 2016	#SPNKarmaNiScarlet	14.1%	#1	
105	Scarlet in Jail	November 21, 2016	#SPNScarletInJail	13.8%	#1	
106	Pagtatapat	November 22, 2016	#SPNPagtatapat	13.4%	#1	
107	Laban kung Laban	November 23, 2016	#SPNLabanKungLaban	10.9%	#1	
108	Reyna ng Selda	November 24, 2016	#SPNReynaNgSelda	13.8%	#1	
109	Pagdurusa	November 25, 2016	#SPNPagdurusa	14.8%	#1	
				AGB Nielsen NUTAM		
110	Setup	November 28, 2016	#SPNSetup	12.0%	#1	
111	Bagong Mayora	November 29, 2016	#SPNBagongMayora	11.1%	#1	
112	Kawalan ng Pag-asa	November 30, 2016	#SPNKawalanNgPagAsa	11.1%	#1	

=== December 2016 ===
Episode		Original air date	Social Media Hashtag	AGB Nielsen NUTAM		Ref.
Episode		Original air date	Social Media Hashtag	Rating	Timeslot Rank	Ref.
113	Jonas at Benedict	December 1, 2016	#SPNJonasAtBenedict	11.3%	#1	
114	Imbestigasyon	December 2, 2016	#SPNImbestigasyon	11.8%	#1	
115	Paglaya	December 5, 2016	#SPNPaglaya	12.1%	#1	
116	Sorpresa kay Ysabel	December 6, 2016	#SPNSorpresaKayYsabel	12.9%	#1	
117	Desperadang Scarlet	December 7, 2016	#SPNDesperadangScarlet	12.0%	#1	
118	Tunay na Ina	December 8, 2016	#SPNTunayNaIna	11.7%	#1	
119	Facing the Truth	December 9, 2016	#SPNFacingTheTruth	11.6%	#1	
120	Pananakot	December 12, 2016	#SPNPananakot	11.7%	#2	
121	Ebidensya	December 13, 2016	#SPNEbidensya	13.9%	#1	
122	Lihim ni Scarlet	December 14, 2016	#SPNLihimNiScarlet	12.1%	#1	
123	Maitim na Balak	December 15, 2016	#SPNMaitimNaBalak	13.3%	#1	
124	The Truth is Out	December 16, 2016	#SPNTheTruthIsOut	13.7%	#1	
125	Sabotahe ni Scarlet	December 19, 2016	#SPNSabotaheNiScarlet	12.1%	#1	
126	Pagkukunwari	December 20, 2016	#SPNPagkukunwari	12.8%	#1	
127	Pagtatapat ni Jonas	December 21, 2016	#SPNPagtatapatNiJonas	12.2%	#1	
128	Trapped si Katherine	December 22, 2016	#SPNTrappedSiKatherine	13.2%	#1	
129	Pagtakas ni Katherine	December 23, 2016	#SPNPagtakasNiKatherine	13.8%	#1	
130	Saving Katherine	December 26, 2016	#SPNSavingKatherine	13.1%	#1	
131	Hinagpis	December 27, 2016	#SPNHinagpis	12.6%	#1	
132	Trapped	December 28, 2016	#SPNTrapped	13.6%	#1	
133	Kundisyon ni Scarlet	December 29, 2016	#SPNKundisyonNiScarlet	12.6%	#1	
134	Bulilyaso	December 30, 2016	#SPNBulilyaso	11.7%	#1	

=== January 2017 ===
Episode		Original air date	Social Media Hashtag	AGB Nielsen NUTAM		Ref.
Episode		Original air date	Social Media Hashtag	Rating	Timeslot Rank	Ref.
135	Rescue	January 2, 2017	#SPNRescue	13.3%	#1	
136	Habulan	January 3, 2017	#SPNHabulan	12.6%	#1	
137	Pagbabalik ni Rod	January 4, 2017	#SPNPagbabalikNiRod	11.5%	#1	
138	Hostage	January 5, 2017	#SPNHostage	11.8%	#2	
139	Resbak ni Rod	January 6, 2017	#SPNResbakNiRod	11.9%	#2	
140	Pagkukunwari ni Ysabel	January 9, 2017	#SPNPagkukunwariNiYsabel	11.0%	#2	
141	Benedict Misses Ysabel	January 10, 2017	#SPNBenedictMissesYsabel	12.3%	#2	
142	Tiwala	January 11, 2017	#SPNTiwala	13.7%	#2	
143	Katotohanan	January 12, 2017	#SPNKatotohanan	11.6%	#2	
144	Muling Pagtakas	January 13, 2017	#SPNMulingPagtakas	11.9%	#2	
145	Hinaing	January 16, 2017	#SPNHinaing	10.8%	#2	
146	Ysabel in Danger	January 17, 2017	#SPNYsabelInDanger	11.0%	#2	
147	Bingit ng Kamatayan	January 18, 2017	#SPNBingitNgKamatayan	12.6%	#1	
148	Dead End	January 19, 2017	#SPNDeadEnd	11.2%	#2	
149	Bwelta ni Scarlet	January 20, 2017	#SPNBweltaNiScarlet	12.2%	#1	
150	Kapit lang, Ysabel!	January 23, 2017	#SPNKapitLangYsabel	11.9%	#2	
151	Jonas to the Rescue	January 24, 2017	#SPNJonasToTheRescue	13.4%	#1	
152	Paalam, Jonas	January 25, 2017	#SPNPaalamJonas	13.1%	#1	
153	Kabayanihan	January 26, 2017	#SPNKabayanihan	11.6%	#1	
154	Pagwawakas	January 27, 2017	#SPNPagwawakas	13.9%	#1	

Episodes notes
