= Hanggang Makita Kang Muli =

2016 Philippine television drama series

- Title card
- Also known as: Until We Meet Again
- Genre: Drama
- Created by: Wiro Michael Ladera
- Written by: Christine Badillo-Novicio; Rhoda Sulit-Marino; Roan Sales; Wiro Michael Ladera
- Directed by: Laurice Guillen
- Creative director: Roy Iglesias
- Starring: Bea Binene
- Opening theme: "Hanggang Makita Kang Muli" by Aicelle Santos
- Country of origin: Philippines
- Original language: Tagalog
- No. of episodes: 93 (list of episodes)

Production
- Executive producer: Rebya V. Upalda
- Producer: Elvie J. Sicangco
- Production locations: Manila, Philippines; Quezon City, Philippines; Pangasinan, Philippines
- Cinematography: Jay Abello; Boy Arnaldo
- Camera setup: Multiple-camera setup
- Running time: 19–29 minutes
- Production company: GMA Entertainment TV

Original release
- Network: GMA Network
- Release: March 7 – July 15, 2016

Hanggang Makita Kang Muli (transl. until I see you again / international title: Until We Meet Again) is a 2016 Philippine television drama series broadcast by GMA Network. Directed by Laurice Guillen, it stars Bea Binene. It premiered on March 7, 2016 on the network's Afternoon Prime line up. The series concluded on July 15, 2016, with a total of 93 episodes.

The series is streaming online on YouTube.

== Premise ==
Due to Odessa's obsession with Larry, she will destroy Larry's relationship with Evelyn. Odessa will kidnap their child and lock the child in an abandoned warehouse. The kid, Ana will grow up with a dog causing her to act like an animal. Eventually Ana will escape from the warehouse and meet Calvin.

== Cast and characters ==
Cast

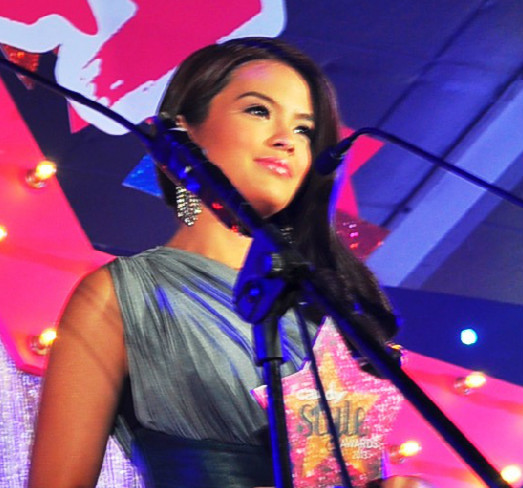
Bea Binene

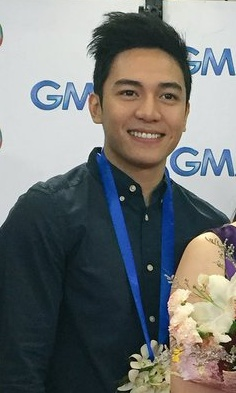
Jak Roberto

Lead cast

- Bea Binene as Ana Isabelle E. Medrano / Angela

Supporting cast

- Derrick Monasterio as Calvin Manahan
- Raymart Santiago as Larry Medrano
- Angelika Dela Cruz as Evelyn Esguerra-Medrano
- Ina Feleo as Odessa Luna / Margaret
- Kim Rodriguez as Claire Esguerra
- Rita Avila as Glenda Manahan
- Ramon Christopher Gutierrez as Francisco "Francis" Manahan
- Luz Valdez as Conching Luna
- Marco Alcaraz as Dominic Reyes
- Jak Roberto as Elmo Manahan-Villamor
- Shyr Valdez as Helen Esguerra-Borja

Recurring cast

- Frank Magalona as Bernard Vivas
- Elle Ramirez as Charmaine "Charm" Alvarez
- Coleen Perez as Myla
- Allan Paule as Lando Sandoval
- Dexter Doria as Yolanda
- Kevin Sagra as Jomar
- Avery Paraiso as Marlon Santos
- Kyle Vergara as Louie del Castillo
- Shermaine Santiago as Jelly

Guest cast

- Ar Angel Aviles as younger Odessa
- Jayzelle Suan as younger Ana
- Lawrence Marasigan as younger Calvin
- Thom Brickman as John

== Production ==
Principal photography concluded in June 2016.

== Ratings ==
According to AGB Nielsen Philippines' Mega Manila household television ratings, the pilot episode of Hanggang Makita Kang Muli earned a 13.8% rating. The final episode scored an 18.9% rating.
