= Raising Mamay =

2022 Philippine television drama series

- Title card
- Also known as: Raising Mama
- Genre: Drama
- Written by: Anna Aleta Nadela; Loi Argel Nova; Geng Delgado
- Directed by: Don Michael Perez
- Creative director: Aloy Adlawan
- Starring: Ai-Ai delas Alas
- Theme music composer: Natasha Correos
- Opening theme: "Ikaw ang Buhay Ko" by Jeniffer Maravilla
- Country of origin: Philippines
- Original language: Tagalog
- No. of episodes: 70

Production
- Executive producer: Rosie Lyn M. Atienza
- Camera setup: Multiple-camera setup
- Running time: 22–31 minutes
- Production company: GMA Entertainment Group

Original release
- Network: GMA Network
- Release: April 25 – July 29, 2022

Raising Mamay (international title: Raising Mama) is a 2022 Philippine television drama series broadcast by GMA Network. Directed by Don Michael Perez, it stars Ai-Ai delas Alas in the title role. It premiered on April 25, 2022 on the network's Afternoon Prime line up. The series concluded on July 29, 2022, with a total of 70 episodes.

The series is streaming online on YouTube.

== Cast and characters ==
Cast

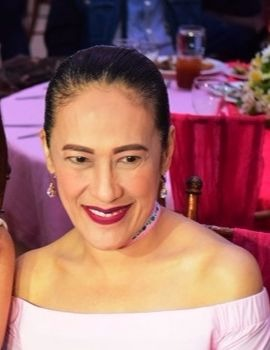
Ai-Ai delas Alas

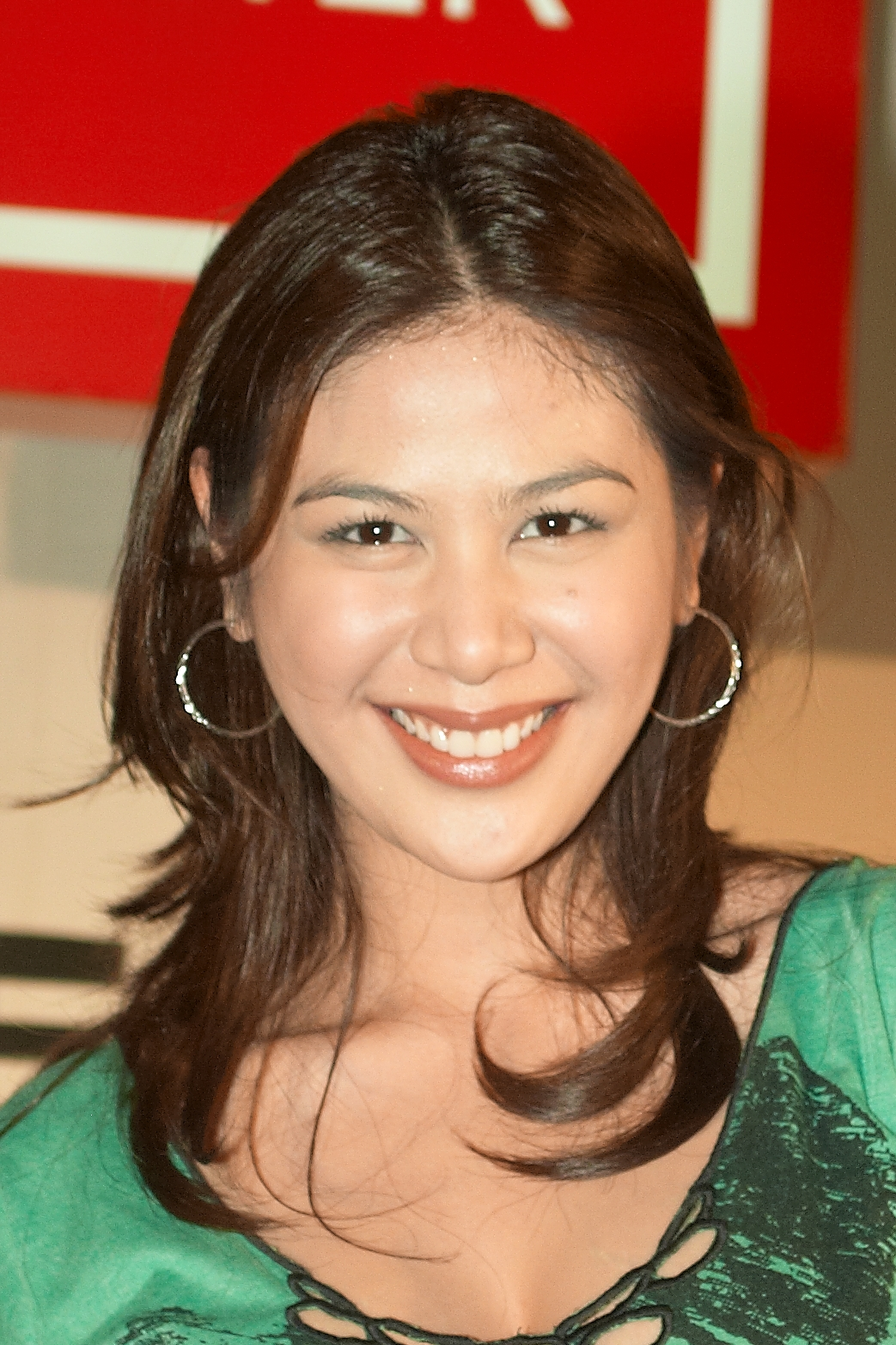
Valerie Concepcion

Lead cast

- Ai-Ai delas Alas as Leticia "Letty / Mamay" Reyes-Sandejas

Supporting cast

- Shayne Sava as Abigail "Abby" R. Sandejas
- Abdul Rahman as Paolo Ampil
- Valerie Concepcion as Sylvia Gonzales-Renancia
- Gary Estrada as Randy Renancia
- Antonio Aquitania as Bong "Daday" Sandejas
- Ina Feleo as Malou Reyes
- Joyce Ching as Arma Villasis
- Tart Carlos as Wenda Liles
- Bryce Eusebio as Christopher Renancia
- Raquel Pareño as Berna Gonzales
- Orlando Sol as Monching Cruz
- Hannah Arguelles as Dwein Liles
- Ella Cristofani as Kelly Gomez
- Lei Angela Ollet as Pam Galvez
- Joshua Zamora as SPO1 Sanchez

== Production ==
Principal photography commenced on February 25, 2022.

== Ratings ==
According to AGB Nielsen Philippines' Nationwide Urban Television Audience Measurement People in television homes, the pilot episode of Raising Mamay earned a 5.6% rating.
