= Kakambal ni Eliana =

2013 Philippine television drama series

- Title card
- Also known as: Eliana's Twin
- Genre: Fantasy drama
- Developed by: Des Garbes Severino
- Written by: Rona Sales; John Kenneth de Leon
- Directed by: Roderick Lindayag
- Creative director: Jun Lana
- Starring: Kim Rodriguez
- Theme music composer: Dodgie Simoun
- Opening theme: "Kung Alam Mo Lang" by Maricris Garcia
- Country of origin: Philippines
- Original language: Tagalog
- No. of episodes: 93

Production
- Executive producer: Jojo T. Aleta
- Cinematography: Patrick Jess Ferrer
- Camera setup: Multiple-camera setup
- Running time: 30–45 minutes
- Production company: GMA Entertainment TV

Original release
- Network: GMA Network
- Release: April 15 – August 23, 2013

Kakambal ni Eliana (transl. twin of Eliana / international title: Eliana's Twin) is a 2013 Philippine television drama fantasy series broadcast by GMA Network. Directed by Roderick Lindayag, it stars Kim Rodriguez. It premiered on April 15, 2013 on the network's Afternoon Prime line up. The series concluded on August 23, 2013, with a total of 93 episodes.

The series is streaming online on YouTube.

== Premise ==
The story revolves around the life of Eliana, a girl who was born with a black snake attached to her back. The reptile wraps itself around her hand every time she experience extreme emotions like sadness or anger. She spends her life hidden in a basement, until she manages to get away. In the process, she strives to find out the truth about herself and her family.

She will eventually discover new things and meet people that will eventually change her life. In the outside world, she meets new friends and two of them, Gabo and Julian fall in love with her. Gabo is a street-smart lad who accepts Eliana for who she is, while Julian is a fashion photographer who is bewildered by Eliana's beauty, not knowing that she has a snake twin. However, she also meets her rival, Margarita, who is Julian's model-girlfriend and unknown to everyone, her half sister.

== Cast and characters ==
Lead cast

- Kim Rodriguez as Isabella Eliana Cascavel-Dominguez

Supporting cast

- Jean Garcia as Isabel "Bel" Cascavel-Dominguez (formerly Monteverde)
- Kristoffer Martin as Gabriel "Gabo" Santillan
- Jomari Yllana as Emmanuel "Eman" Dominguez
- Chynna Ortaleza as Minerva San Beda
- Enzo Pineda as Julian de Vera
- Lexi Fernandez as Margarita "Marga" Dominguez
- Leo Martinez as Eddie Cascavel
- Eva Darren as Aurora Cascavel
- Sherwin Revister as the voice of Naja

Recurring cast

- Antonio Aquitania as Sebastian "Basti" Monteverde
- Sherilyn Reyes-Tan as Nora Dominguez
- Carlene Aguilar as Angie De Vera
- Jay-R as Nathan De Vera
- Ernie Garcia as Samuel Dominguez
- Carmen Soriano as Henrietta Monteverde
- Mosang as Tetay
- Rez Cortez as Prof. Banal
- Aicelle Santos as Kate Banal
- Sue Prado as Cora
- Anette Samin as Claire Cascavel
- Marnie Lapuz as Mrs. San Jose

== Development ==
Screenwriter, Des Garbes Severino conceptualized and developed the series in mid-2011, initially titled as Serpentina. The idea for the series was inspired from the urban myth—that has been around since the 80's—about the daughter of a mall owner who has a snake twin and dwells in a secret room of the mall.

On February 11, 2013 the four main characters underwent a "snake workshop" with two Mexican black kingsnakes. The drill required them to get familiarized with all the snake species.

== Ratings ==
According to AGB Nielsen Philippines' Mega Manila household television ratings, the pilot episode of Kakambal ni Eliana earned a 12.2% rating. The final episode scored a 17.3% rating.

== Accolades ==
Accolades received by Kakambal ni Eliana
| Year | Award | Category | Recipient | Result | Ref. |
|---|---|---|---|---|---|
| 2013 | 27th PMPC Star Awards for Television | Best Daytime Drama Series | Kakambal ni Eliana | Nominated | |
