= Sa Piling ni Nanay =

Philippine television drama series

- Title card
- Also known as: Ysabel
- Genre: Drama
- Created by: Rona Lean Sales
- Written by: Obert Villela; Jonathan Cruz; Jake Somera; Gilda Olvidado-Marcelino
- Directed by: Gil Tejada Jr.; Omar Deroca
- Creative director: Roy Iglesias
- Starring: Yasmien Kurdi; Katrina Halili; Mark Herras
- Theme music composer: John Meer Vera Perez; Adonis Tabanda
- Opening theme: "Sa Piling ni Nanay" by Jillian Ward
- Country of origin: Philippines
- Original language: Tagalog
- No. of episodes: 154 (list of episodes)

Production
- Executive producer: Joseph T. Aleta
- Producer: Marissa J. Hilario
- Production locations: Quezon City, Philippines; San Fernando, Pampanga, Philippines
- Cinematography: Lito Mempin
- Editors: Mark Sison; Juluis Castillo; Robert Pancho
- Camera setup: Multiple-camera setup
- Running time: 19–27 minutes
- Production company: GMA Entertainment TV

Original release
- Network: GMA Network
- Release: June 27, 2016 – January 27, 2017

Sa Piling ni Nanay (transl. in cluster of mother / international title: Ysabel) is a Philippine television drama series broadcast by GMA Network. Directed by Gil Tejada Jr. and Omar Deroca, it stars Yasmien Kurdi, Katrina Halili and Mark Herras. It premiered on June 27, 2016 on the network's Afternoon Prime line up. The series concluded on January 27, 2017, with a total of 154 episodes.

The series is originally titled as Womb for Hire. The series is streaming online on YouTube.

== Premise ==
Ysabel is a single mother to Maymay. Working as a personal assistant to Scarlet, who married Javier for money. Scarlet is incapable to give her husband a child and convinces Javier to get a surrogate mother, Ysabel. Scarlet knows Ysabel needs money because Maymay has leukemia. Maymay later dies while Ysabel is still pregnant who will become the kid of Scarlet and Javier, Maya. Due to sadness, Ysabel will take away Maya and she will raise her like her own daughter.

== Cast and characters ==
Cast

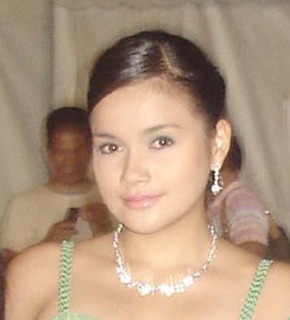
Yasmien Kurdi

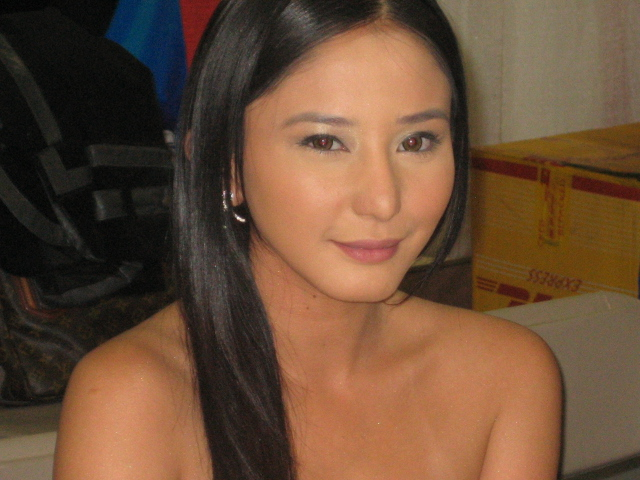
Katrina Halili

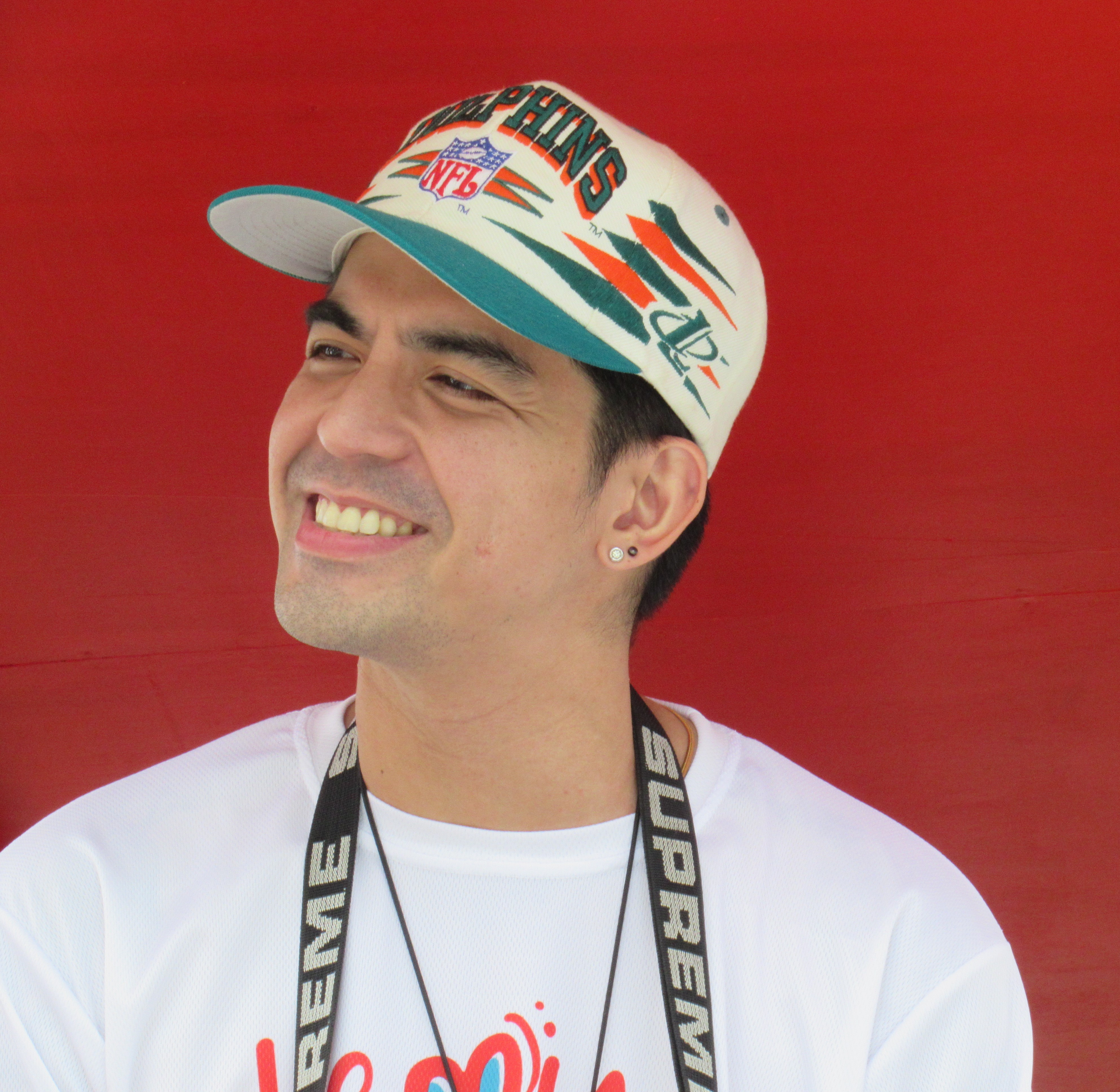
Mark Herras

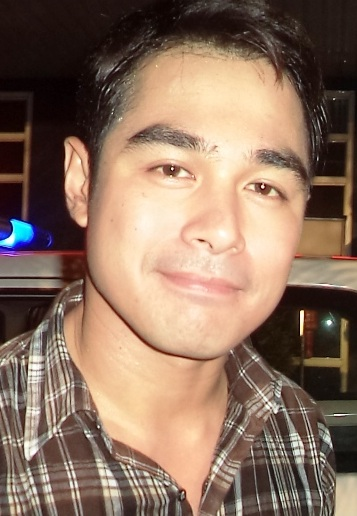
Benjamin Alves

Lead cast

- Yasmien Kurdi as Ysabel Salvacion-de Guzman / Zeny Alfonse
- Mark Herras as Jonas Ocampo
- Katrina Halili as Scarlet Morato-Mercado

Supporting cast

- Nova Villa as Matilda Mercado
- Bettina Carlos as Wanda
- Antonio Aquitania as Victor "Rod" Alfonse
- Sofia Catabay as Maya de Guzman / Katharine Mercado-Salvacion
- Benjamin Alves as Javier Mercado

Guest cast

- Chlaui Malayao as Angelica Mae "Maymay" Salvacion
- Dexter Doria as Almeda "Meding" Alfonse
- Chinggoy Riego as Juaning
- Banjo Romero as Budong
- Rap Fernandez as Diaz
- David Licauco as David Jesuitas
- Jaycee Parker as Patty Morato
- Nicole Dulalia as Denise
- Dianne Hernandez as Sofia
- Patricia Ysmael as Greta
- Milkcah Wynne Nacion as Sarah Alfonse
- Zarah Mae Deligero as younger Sarah
- Aprilyn Gustillo as Mayca Pineda
- Shermaine Santiago as Joy Villegas
- Jillian Ward as Katherine Salvacion
- Gabby Eigenmann as Benedict Corpuz
- Irma Adlawan as Remy Santel
- Diva Montelaba as Rose
- Lance Busa as Mocha
- Nikki Co as Michael
- Judie dela Cruz as Mira

== Production ==
Principal photography commenced on May 19, 2016. Filming concluded in January 2017.

== Ratings ==
According to AGB Nielsen Philippines' Mega Manila household television ratings, the pilot episode of Sa Piling ni Nanay earned a 15.4% rating. The final episode scored a 10.7% rating.

== Accolades ==
Accolades received by Sa Piling ni Nanay
Year	Award	Category	Recipient	Result	Ref.
2016	30th PMPC Star Awards for Television	Best Daytime Drama Series	Sa Piling ni Nanay	Nominated	
