= Strawberry Lane =

Philippine television drama series

- Title card
- Genre: Drama
- Created by: Gilda Olvidado
- Written by: Jules Dan Katanyag; Kit Villanueva-Langit; Ann Aleta-Nadela; John Borgy Danao; Ma. Zita Garganera; Leilani Chavez; Gilda Olvidado; Emerson Jake Somera
- Directed by: Don Michael Perez
- Creative director: Jun Lana
- Starring: Bea Binene; Joyce Ching; Kim Rodriguez; Jhoana Marie Tan
- Theme music composer: Janno Gibbs
- Opening theme: "Bagong Umaga" by Julie Anne San Jose
- Country of origin: Philippines
- Original language: Tagalog
- No. of episodes: 80 (list of episodes)

Production
- Executive producer: Kaye Atienza-Cadsawan
- Production locations: Taytay, Rizal, Philippines
- Editors: Joseph Nieva; Nikka Olayvar; Debbie Robete; Sony Custado
- Camera setup: Multiple-camera setup
- Running time: 24–44 minutes
- Production company: GMA Entertainment TV

Original release
- Network: GMA Network
- Release: September 15, 2014 – January 2, 2015

Strawberry Lane is a Philippine television drama series broadcast by GMA Network. Directed by Don Michael Perez, it stars Bea Binene, Joyce Ching, Kim Rodriguez and Jhoana Marie Tan. It premiered on September 15, 2014 on the network's Telebabad line up. The series concluded on January 2, 2015, with a total of 80 episodes.

The series is streaming online on YouTube.

== Premise ==
The story focuses on the lives of Clarissa, Jack, Dorina and Lupe who are in Bagong Bahay Pangarap, a reformation center for girls. Despite having different personalities, they share the same hope of fulfilling their dreams.

== Cast and characters ==
Cast

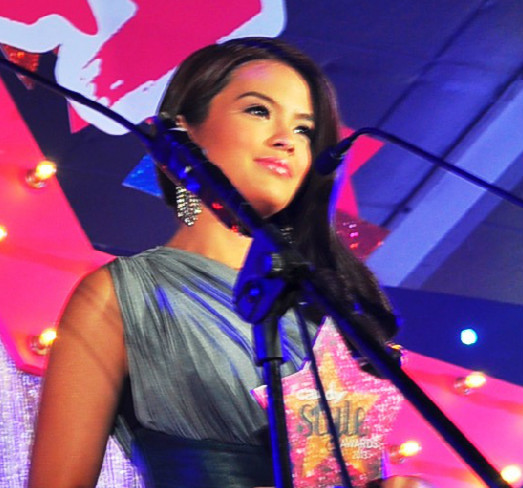
Bea Binene

Standing from L-R: Kiko Estrada, Jake Vargas and Jeric Gonzales. Sitting from L–R: Rita De Guzman, Kim Rodriguez, Bea Binene, Joyce Ching and Jhoana Marie Tan.

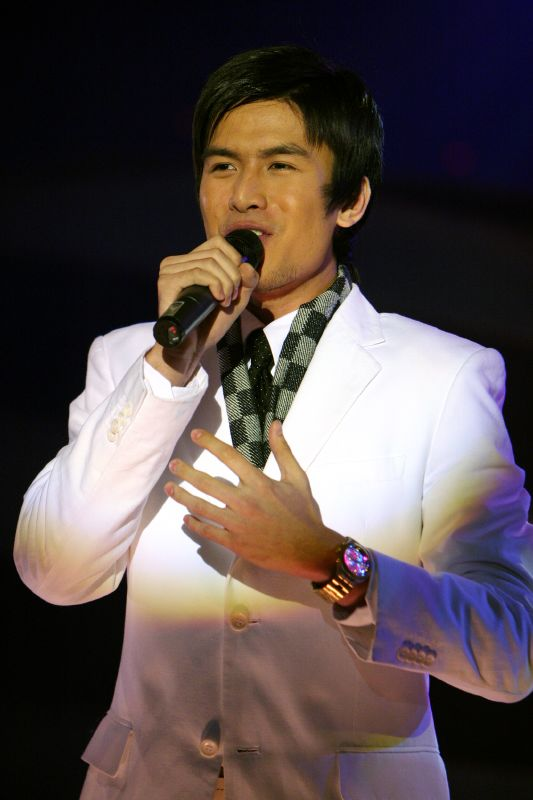
Christian Bautista

Lead cast

- Bea Binene as Clarissa Tolentino Morales-Valentino
- Kim Rodriguez as Jacqueline "Jack" Perez-Dizon
- Joyce Ching as Dorina Tolentino Morales / Amelia "Amy" Tolentino Morales / Dory Peralta
- Jhoana Marie Tan as Guadalupe "Lupe" Delgado-Bustamante

Supporting cast

- Jake Vargas as Gabriel "Gabo" Valentino
- Kiko Estrada as Paulino "Paul" Dizon
- Jeric Gonzales as George Bustamante
- Rita De Guzman as Lavinia Tolentino Bernarte
- Sunshine Dizon as Elena "Elaine" Tolentino-Morales
- Sheryl Cruz as Monique Tolentino-Bernarte
- Christian Bautista as Richard "Rich" Tolentino
- TJ Trinidad as Jonathan "Jun" Morales
- Chanda Romero as Digna Castro
- Boots Anson-Roa as Stella Tolentino

Recurring cast

- Marky Lopez as Carlyn
- Shelly Hipolito as April Jaymalin
- Tessie Tomas as Margaret Jaymalin
- Nicole Dulalia as Chloe
- Sherilyn Reyes-Tan as Marga Valentino
- Diego Castro as Mario
- Djanin Cruz as Loisa
- Ar Angel Aviles as Kachuchay

Guest cast

- Lani Mercado as Maring Javier
- Tanya Garcia as Myrna Javier / Sarah Jaymalin
- Raymond Bagatsing as Hector Rosales
- Tina Paner as Salve "Marcela" Rosales
- Jan Marini as Rebecca "Bebs" Rosales
- Dang Cruz as Esther
- Weng Fernando as Syl
- Rosemarie Sarita as Luiza
- Ashley Cabrera as younger Dorina
- Milkcah Wynne Nacion as younger Clarissa
- James Wright as Gil Villa
- Jenine Desiderio as Villa
- Jay Manalo as Christopher "Chris" Bernarte
- Aicelle Santos as Lani Delgado
- Gino Padilla as Bustamante
- Caprice Cayetano as Dorina's sister
- Carme Sanchez as Dorina's grandmother
- Ynez Veneracion as Dolores
- Art Acuña as Delphin
- Katya Santos as Helena
- Charee Pineda as Marieta

== Ratings ==
According to AGB Nielsen Philippines' Mega Manila household television ratings, the pilot episode of Strawberry Lane earned a 28.2% rating which is the series' highest rating. The final episode scored a 22.7% rating.

== Accolades ==
Accolades received by Strawberry Lane
| Year | Award | Category | Recipient | Result | Ref. |
|---|---|---|---|---|---|
| 2015 | 29th PMPC Star Awards for Television | Best Supporting Actress | Sheryl Cruz | Won | |
