= Descendants of the Sun: The Philippine Adaptation =

2020 Philippine television drama series

- Title card
- Genre: Romantic drama; Action
- Based on: Descendants of the Sun (2016) by Lee Eung-bok and Baek Sang-hoon
- Written by: John Roque; Glaiza Ramirez; Brylle Tabora; John Bedia; Liberty Trinidad
- Directed by: Dominic Zapata
- Creative director: Aloy Adlawan
- Starring: Dingdong Dantes; Jennylyn Mercado
- Theme music composer: Gaemi
- Opening theme: "You are My Everything" by Julie Anne San Jose
- Country of origin: Philippines
- Original language: Tagalog
- No. of episodes: 65 (list of episodes)

Production
- Executive producer: Winnie Hollis-Reyes
- Production locations: Fortune Island, Philippines
- Cinematography: Roman Theodossis
- Editors: Benedict Lavastida; Robert Ryan Reyes
- Camera setup: Multiple-camera setup
- Running time: 25–42 minutes
- Production company: GMA Entertainment Group

Original release
- Network: GMA Network
- Release: February 10 – December 25, 2020

Descendants of the Sun: The Philippine Adaptation is a 2020 Philippine television drama romance action series broadcast by GMA Network. The series is based on a 2016 South Korean television drama series of the same title. Directed by Dominic Zapata, it stars Dingdong Dantes and Jennylyn Mercado. It premiered on February 10, 2020 on the network's Telebabad line up. The series concluded on December 25, 2020, with a total of 65 episodes.

The series is streaming online on YouTube.

== Cast and characters ==
Cast

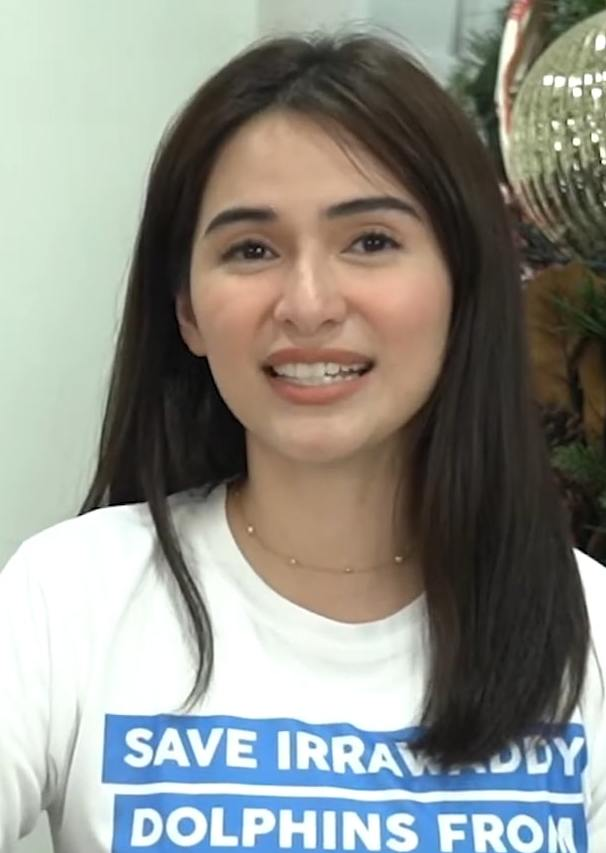
Jennylyn Mercado

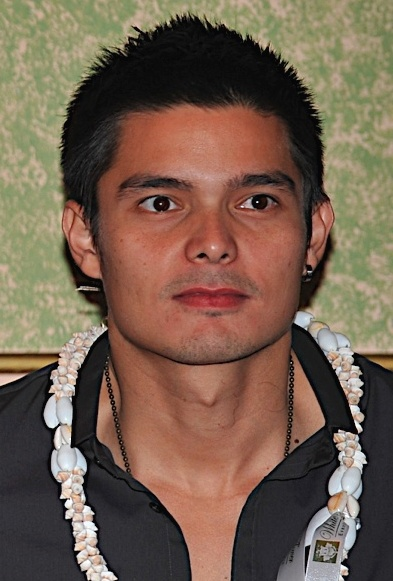
Dingdong Dantes

Lead cast

- Dingdong Dantes as Lucas Manalo
- Jennylyn Mercado as Maxine Dela Cruz

Supporting cast

- Rocco Nacino as Diego Ramos / Wolf
- Jasmine Curtis-Smith as Moira Defensor
- Andre Paras as Ralph Vergara
- Chariz Solomon as Emma Perez
- Renz Fernandez as Earl Jimeno
- Pancho Magno as Daniel Spencer
- Nicole Kim Donesa as Via Catindig
- Reese Tuazon as Sandra Delgado
- Jenzel Angeles as Hazel Flores
- Bobby Andrews as Eric Chavez
- Ricardo Cepeda as Carlos Defensor
- Paul Salas as Marty Talledo
- Lucho Ayala as Alen Eugenio / Snoopy
- Jon Lucas as Benjo Tamayo / Harry Potter
- Prince Clemente as Randy Katipunan / Picollo
- Antonio Aquitania as Bienvenido Garcia
- Neil Ryan Sese as Rodel Dela Cruz
- Ian Ignacio as Greg Abad
- Rich Asuncion as Janet Pagsisihan
- Carlo Gonzales as Val Domingo
- Roi Vinzon as Abraham Manalo
- Hailey Mendes as Judith Manalo
- Marina Benipayo as Olivia Dela Cruz

Guest cast

- Mike "Pekto" Nacua
- Tonton Gutierrez as General Cruz
- Sophie Albert as Liza Ayson
- Gabby Eigenmann as Ricardo Sintallan
- Andrew Schimmer as Jimmy
- Sue Prado as Sheila
- Kim Rodriguez as Denise
- Addy Raj as Alif Fayad
- Ronnie Henares as Ed
- Mark Herras as Orly
- Archie Adamos as Lito

== Development ==
Descendants of the Sun is a 2016 South Korean television drama series broadcast by KBS2. Written by Kim Eun-sook and Kim Won-seok and directed by Lee Eung-bok and Baek Sang-hoon, the series starred Song Joong-ki, Song Hye-kyo, Jin Goo, and Kim Ji-won. In the same year, the series was later aired in the Philippines, through GMA Network.

== Production ==
Principal photography commenced in July 2019. It was halted in March 2020 due to the enhanced community quarantine in Luzon caused by the COVID-19 pandemic. Filming was continued on September 1, 2020 and concluded on September 10, 2020. The series resumed its programming on November 5, 2020.

== Ratings ==
According to AGB Nielsen Philippines' Nationwide Urban Television Audience Measurement People in Television Homes, the pilot episode of Descendants of the Sun earned a 10.5% rating.

== Accolades ==
Accolades received by Descendants of the Sun
Year	Award	Category	Recipient	Result	Ref.
2020	15th Seoul International Drama Awards	Most Popular Foreign Drama of the Year	Descendants of the Sun	Won	
2021	34th PMPC Star Awards for Television	Best Drama Actor	Dingdong Dantes	Nominated	
2021	34th PMPC Star Awards for Television	Best Drama Actress	Jennylyn Mercado	Nominated	
2021	34th PMPC Star Awards for Television	Best Drama Supporting Actor	Rocco Nacino	Nominated	
