= List of Hanggang Makita Kang Muli episodes =

Hanggang Makita Kang Muli is a 2016 Philippine television drama series broadcast by GMA Network. It premiered on the network's Afternoon Prime line up and worldwide on GMA Pinoy TV from March 7, 2016 to July 15, 2016 replacing Buena Familia.

Mega Manila and Urban Luzon ratings are provided by AGB Nielsen Philippines.

== Series overview ==
Month	Episodes	
Month	Episodes	Monthly Averages
March 2016	17	15.7%
April 2016	21	16.0%
May 2016	22	15.3%
June 2016	22	17.1%
July 2016	11	17.5%
Total	93	16.3%

== Episodes ==
=== March 2016 ===
Episode		Original air date	Social Media Hashtag	AGB Nielsen Mega Manila Households in Television Homes			Ref.
Episode		Original air date	Social Media Hashtag	Rating	Timeslot Rank	Daytime Rank	Ref.
1	Pilot	March 7, 2016	#HanggangMakitaKangMuli	13.8%	#1	#4	
2	Delikado	March 8, 2016	#HMKMDelikado	14.1%	#1	#4	
3	Panganib	March 9, 2016	#HMKMPanganib	15.2%	#1	#4	
4	Pangungulila	March 10, 2016	#HMKMPangungulila	14.1%	#1	#5	
5	Feral Child	March 11, 2016	#HMKMFeralChild	16.8%	#1	#4	
6	Paghahanap	March 14, 2016	#HMKMPaghahanap	15.0%	#1	#4	
7	Pagdating ni Calvin	March 15, 2016	#HMKMPagdatingNiCalvin	16.2%	#1	#3	
8	Paghabol	March 16, 2016	#HMKMPaghabol	17.4%	#1	#3	
9	Pagpapaamo	March 17, 2016	#HMKMPagpapaamo	16.6%	#1	#4	
10	Pagtatanggol	March 18, 2016	#HMKMPagtatanggol	15.6%	#1	#3	
11	Nawawalang Anak	March 21, 2016	#HMKMNawawalangAnak	14.1%	#1	#5	
12	Reunited	March 22, 2016	#HMKMReunited	18.6%	#1	#2	
13	Kaguluhan	March 23, 2016	#HMKMKaguluhan	17.0%	#1	#3	
14	Hulihin si Ana	March 28, 2016	#HMKMHulihinSiAna	15.1%	#1	#4	
15	Mag-ina	March 29, 2016	#HMKMMagina	15.3%	#1	#4	
16	Balak ni Odessa	March 30, 2016	#HMKMBalakNiOdessa	15.6%	#1	#3	
17	Mama	March 31, 2016	#HMKMMama	16.2%	#1	#2	

=== April 2016 ===
Episode		Original air date	Social Media Hashtag	AGB Nielsen Mega Manila Households in Television Homes			Ref.
Episode		Original air date	Social Media Hashtag	Rating	Timeslot Rank	Daytime Rank	Ref.
18	Aruga ng Ina	April 1, 2016	#HMKMArugaNgIna	16.4%	#1	#2	
19	May Pag-asa	April 4, 2016	#HMKMMayPagasa	18.0%	#1	#2	
20	Malasakit ni Evelyn	April 5, 2016	#HMKMMalasakitNiEvelyn	16.8%	#1	#2	
21	Madamdaming Pagkikita	April 6, 2016	#HMKMMadamdamingPagkikita	17.3%	#1	#2	
22	Pagpapanggap	April 7, 2016	#HMKMPagpapanggap	16.8%	#1	#3	
23	Galit ng Ama	April 8, 2016	#HMKMGalitNgAma	16.6%	#1	#2	
24	Pahamak	April 11, 2016	#HMKMPahamak	16.8%	#1	#2	
25	Pag-agaw kay Angela	April 12, 2016	#HMKMPagAgawKayAngela	16.4%	#1	#3	
26	Hindi Makilala	April 13, 2016	#HMKMHindiMakilala	15.0%	#1	#3	
27	Nawawala si Angela	April 14, 2016	#HMKMNawawalaSiAngela	14.4%	#1	#4	
28	Paglimot	April 15, 2016	#HMKMPaglimot	14.6%	#1	#3	
29	Gantimpala	April 18, 2016	#HMKMGantimpala	16.0%	#1	#3	
30	Bagong Angela	April 19, 2016	#HMKMBagongAngela	15.3%	#1	#2	
31	Banta ni Claire	April 20, 2016	#HMKMBantaNiClaire	16.3%	#1	#2	
32	Pinagtagpong Muli	April 21, 2016	#HMKMPinagtagpongMuli	16.3%	#1	#2	
33	Tanggap ni Lorry	April 22, 2016	#HMKMTanggapNiLorry	15.8%	#1	#3	
34	Masamang Balak	April 25, 2016	#HMKMMasamangBalak	14.8%	#1	#3	
35	Pang-aapi	April 26, 2016	#HMKMPangAapi	14.9%	#1	#3	
36	Pangungulila	April 27, 2016	#HMKMPangungulila	16.1%	#1	#3	
37	Alaalang Nagbabalik	April 28, 2016	#HMKMAlaalangNagbabalik	15.9%	#1	#3	
38	Muntik Malaman	April 29, 2016	#HMKMMuntikMalaman	15.7%	#1	#3	

=== May 2016 ===
Episode		Original air date	Social Media Hashtag	AGB Nielsen Mega Manila Households in Television Homes			Ref.
Episode		Original air date	Social Media Hashtag	Rating	Timeslot Rank	Afternoon Rank	Ref.
39	Hinala	May 2, 2016	#HMKMHinala	15.7%	#1	#3	
40	Balik Feral Child	May 3, 2016	#HMKMBalikFeralChild	16.2%	#1	#3	
41	Alam na ni Odessa	May 4, 2016	#HMKMAlamNaNiOdessa	16.4%	#1	#2	
42	Masamang Plano	May 5, 2016	#HMKMMasamangPlano	16.4%	#1	#2	
43	Hindi Matandaan	May 6, 2016	#HMKMHindiMatandaan	15.6%	#1	#3	
44	Pakiusap	May 9, 2016	#HMKMPakiusap	13.7%	#1	#3	
45	Yakap	May 10, 2016	#HMKMYakap	15.6%	#1	#2	
46	Breakup	May 11, 2016	#HMKMBreakUp	16.4%	#1	#3	
47	Muntikang Halik	May 12, 2016	#HMKMMuntikangHalik	15.1%	#1	#3	
48	Angela's Party	May 13, 2016	#HMKMAngelasParty	14.1%	#1	#4	
49	Transformation	May 16, 2016	#HMKMTransformation	14.7%	#1	#2	
50	Selos pa More!	May 17, 2016	#HMKMSelosPaMore	13.5%	#1	#4	
51	Party is Over	May 18, 2016	#HMKMPartyIsOver	16.1%	#1	#2	
52	Evelyn Vs Odessa	May 19, 2016	#HMKMEvelynVsOdessa	16.1%	#1	#3	
53	Umiibig	May 20, 2016	#HMKMUmiibig	16.8%	#1	#3	
54	Pag-aalala	May 23, 2016	#HMKMPagAalala	15.0%	#1	#3	
55	Halik	May 24, 2016	#HMKMHalik	13.6%	#1	#2	
56	Paghahabol ni Claire	May 25, 2016	#HMKMPaghahabolNiClaire	13.1%	#1	#5	
57	Desisyon ni Calvin	May 26, 2016	#HMKMDesisyonNiCalvin	15.9%	#1	#3	
58	Pagpapalayas	May 27, 2016	#HMKMPagpapalayas	14.7%	#1	#4	
59	Pahamak na Pag-ibig	May 30, 2016	#HMKMPahamakNaPagIbig	15.4%	#1	#3	
60	Tanan	May 31, 2016	#HMKMTanan	16.5%	#1	#3	

=== June 2016 ===
Episode		Original air date	Social Media Hashtag	AGB Nielsen Mega Manila Households in Television Homes			Ref.
Episode		Original air date	Social Media Hashtag	Rating	Timeslot Rank	Afternoon Rank	Ref.
61	Guilty si Calvin	June 1, 2016	#HMKMGuiltySiCalvin	13.9%	#1	#3	
62	Pagbabalik	June 2, 2016	#HMKMPagbabalik	16.7%	#1	#3	
63	Biro ng Tadhana	June 3, 2016	#HMKMBiroNgTadhana	18.3%	#1	#2	
64	Reunion with Mama	June 6, 2016	#HMKMReunionWithMama	16.2%	#1	#3	
65	Nanlamig nga ba?	June 7, 2016	#HMKMNanlamigNgaBa	16.2%	#1	#3	
66	Fake Concern	June 8, 2016	#HMKMFakeConcern	16.3%	#1	#3	
67	Malasakit	June 9, 2016	#HMKMMalasakit	17.1%	#1	#3	
68	Totoo ba?	June 10, 2016	#HMKMTotooBa	17.1%	#1	#3	
69	Tuloy ang Paghahanap	June 13, 2016	#HMKMTuloyAngPaghahanap	15.7%	#1	#3	
70	Natuklasang Lihim	June 14, 2016	#HMKMNatuklasangLihim	15.7%	#1	#3	
71	Tangkang Pagtatapat	June 15, 2016	#HMKMTangkangPagtatapat	16.0%	#1	#3	
72	Nasaan si Glenda?	June 16, 2016	#HMKMNasaanSiGlenda	16.6%	#1	#3	
73	Ang Ebidensiya	June 17, 2016	#HMKMAngEbidensiya	18.5%	#1	#2	
74	Madaliin ang Kasal	June 20, 2016	#HMKMMadaliinAngKasal	15.3%	#1	#4	
75	Saklolo	June 21, 2016	#HMKMSaklolo	17.6%	#1	#3	
76	Pagsagip sa Ina	June 22, 2016	#HMKMPagsagipSaIna	17.7%	#1	#4	
77	Sagupaan Muli	June 23, 2016	#HMKMSagupaanMuli	18.1%	#1	#4	
78	Nababahala	June 24, 2016	#HMKMNababahala	19.4%	#1	#2	
79	Pagtatanong	June 27, 2016	#HMKMPagtatanong	18.4%	#1	#3	
80	Silong sa Ulan	June 28, 2016	#HMKMSilongSaUlan	17.5%	#1	#3	
81	Agaw Buhay	June 29, 2016	#HMKMAgawBuhay	19.2%	#1	#2	
82	Pagbabati	June 30, 2016	#HMKMPagbabati	18.4%	#1	#2	

=== July 2016 ===
Episode		Original air date	Social Media Hashtag	AGB Nielsen Urban Luzon Households in Television Homes			Ref.
Episode		Original air date	Social Media Hashtag	Rating	Timeslot Rank	Afternoon Rank	Ref.
83	Cellphone	July 1, 2016	#HMKMCellphone	16.1%	#1	#2	
84	Selos	July 4, 2016	#HMKMSelos	15.9%	#1	#2	
85	Yakap at Halik	July 5, 2016	#HMKMYakapAtHalik	16.0%	#1	#3	
86	Alam na ni Evelyn	July 6, 2016	#HMKMAlamNaNiEvelyn	16.3%	#1	#3	
87	Panganib kay Conching	July 7, 2016	#HMKMPanganibKayConching	16.6%	#1	#3	
88	Muling Pagtutuos	July 8, 2016	#HMKMMulingPagtutuos	18.8%	#1	#3	
89	Huling Lunes	July 11, 2016	#HMKMHulingLunes	18.0%	#1	#3	
90	Huling Martes	July 12, 2016	#HMKMHulingMartes	19.5%	#1	#1	
91	Huling Miyerkules	July 13, 2016	#HMKMHulingMiyerkules	17.8%	#1	#2	
92	Huling Huwebes	July 14, 2016	#HMKMHulingHuwebes	18.8%	#1	#2	
93	Ang Pagwawakas	July 15, 2016	#HMKMAngPagwawakas	18.9%	#1	#2	
