= Ika-5 Utos =

Philippine television drama series

- Title card
- Also known as: Revenge
- Genre: Crime drama
- Created by: Suzette Doctolero
- Written by: R.J. Nuevas; Christine Novicio; Jake Somera
- Directed by: Laurice Guillen
- Creative director: Roy C. Iglesias
- Starring: Jean Garcia; Valerie Concepcion; Gelli de Belen
- Theme music composer: Tata Betita
- Opening theme: "Huwag Kang Papatay" by Maricris Garcia
- Country of origin: Philippines
- Original language: Tagalog
- No. of episodes: 116 (list of episodes)

Production
- Executive producer: Arlene Del Rosario-Pilapil
- Editors: Noel Stamatelaky Mauricio II; Benedict Lavastida
- Camera setup: Multiple-camera setup
- Running time: 24–30 minutes
- Production company: GMA Entertainment Group

Original release
- Network: GMA Network
- Release: September 10, 2018 – February 8, 2019

Ika-5 Utos (pronounced as ika-limang utos / transl. fifth commandment / international title: Revenge) is a Philippine television drama crime series broadcast by GMA Network. Directed by Laurice Guillen, it stars Jean Garcia, Valerie Concepcion and Gelli de Belen. It premiered on September 10, 2018 on the network's Afternoon Prime and Sabado Star Power sa Hapon line up. The series concluded on February 8, 2019, with a total of 116 episodes.

The series is streaming online on YouTube.

== Premise ==
Eloisa had a perfect life due to her successful and loving husband, two nice kids and helpful friends. However Eloisa didn't expect that her friend Clarisse will destroy her peaceful life. When everything is almost gone, Eloisa runs to Kelly to start again. Years after, Eloisa is still hunted by Clarisse's sin.

== Cast and characters ==
Cast

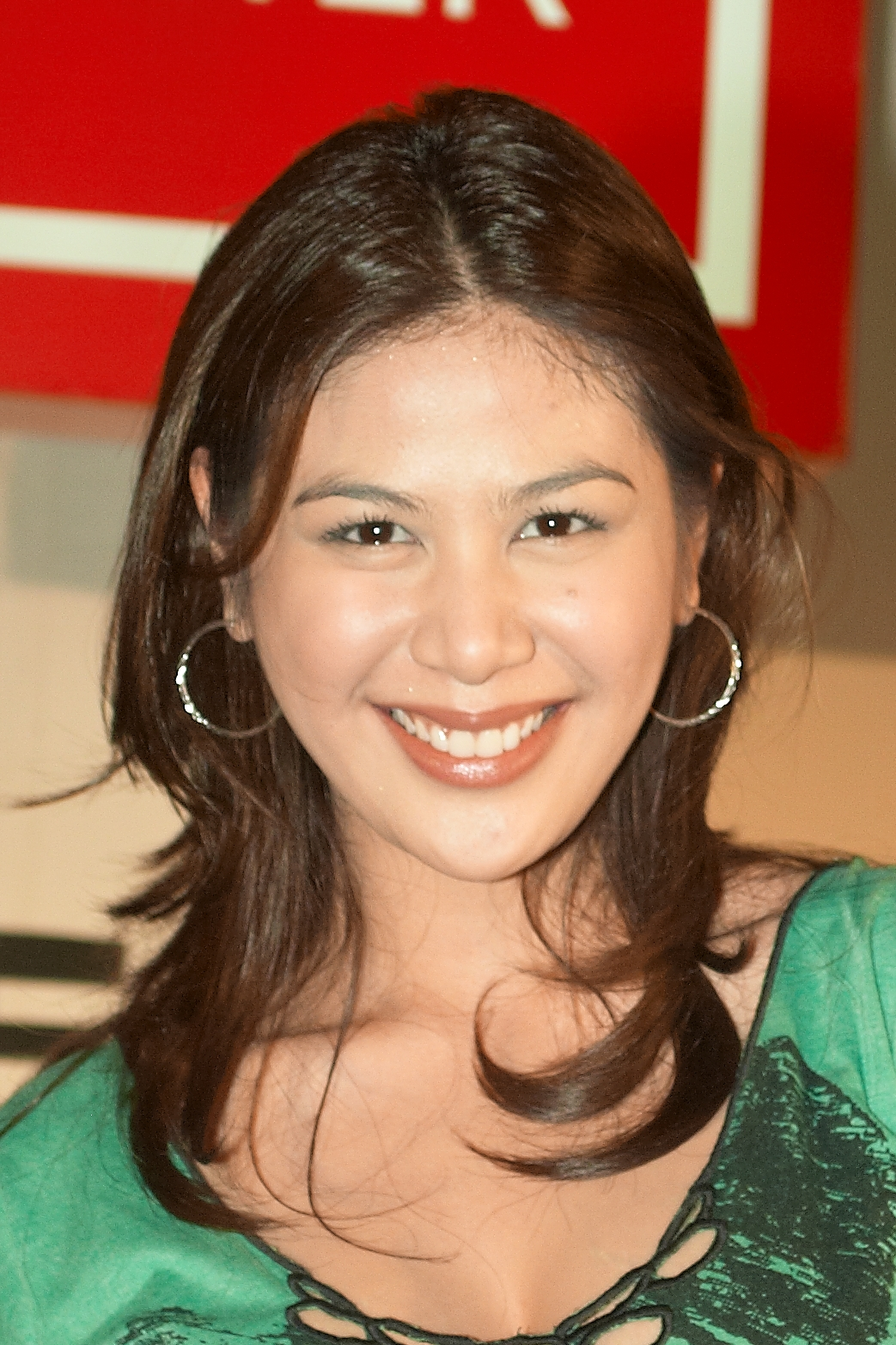
Valerie Concepcion

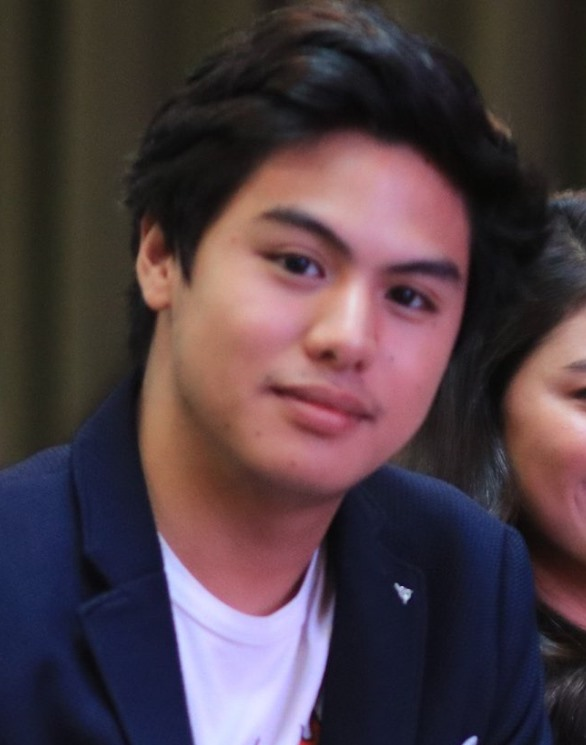
Migo Adecer

Lead cast

- Jean Garcia as Eloisa Vallejo-Buenaventura
- Valerie Concepcion as Clarisse Alfonso-Buenaventura / Cynthia Alfonso
- Gelli de Belen as Kelly San Diego-Manupil

Supporting cast

- Jeric Gonzales as Brix Lorenzo
- Tonton Gutierrez as Emilio "Emil" Buenaventura Sr.
- Migo Adecer as Francis "Frank" Buenaventura
- Klea Pineda as Candy Buenaventura
- Jake Vargas as Carlo Manupil
- Inah de Belen as Joanna Alfonso
- Antonio Aquitania as Benjie Manupil

Recurring cast

- Rez Cortez as Dado Vallejo
- Tanya Gomez as Marina Vallejo
- Louella Cordova as Sonia Alfonso
- Gigi dela Riva as Carmelle San Diego
- Ollie Espino as Mando
- Dea Formilleza as Eya
- Yasser Marta as Macky
- Kevin Sagra as Jepoy
- Prince Clemente as Rey
- Faith da Silva as Denise
- Princess Guevarra as Lisa
- Crisanta Mariano as Citadel

Guest cast

- Neil Ryan Sese as Randy Lorenzo
- Kiko Estrada as Emilio "Leo" Buenaventura Jr.
- Marco Alcaraz as Richard Dela Fuenta
- Kiel Rodriguez as Anton
- Kelvin Miranda as Zach
- Ralf King as David
- Ralph Noriega as Paul
- Divine Tetay as Ludwig
- Kim Rodriguez as Roxanne
- Franchesca Salcedo as Lara
- Lovely Abella as Emily
- Sheena Halili as Millet
- Kevin Santos as Dennis

== Production ==
Principal photography commenced on June 20, 2018. Filming concluded on February 6, 2019.

== Ratings ==
According to AGB Nielsen Philippines' Nationwide Urban Television Audience Measurement People in television homes, the pilot episode of Ika-5 Utos earned a 5.7% rating.
