= Paraiso Ko'y Ikaw =

2014 Philippine television drama series

- Title card
- Also known as: My Paradise
- Genre: Romantic drama
- Developed by: Aloy Adlawan
- Directed by: Joyce E. Bernal; Mark Reyes
- Creative director: Jun Lana
- Starring: Kim Rodriguez; Kristoffer Martin
- Theme music composer: Janno Gibbs
- Opening theme: "Paraiso Ko'y Ikaw" by Janno Gibbs
- Country of origin: Philippines
- Original language: Tagalog
- No. of episodes: 45

Production
- Executive producer: Marjorie Garcia
- Production locations: Zambales, Philippines
- Camera setup: Multiple-camera setup
- Running time: 30–45 minutes
- Production company: GMA Entertainment TV

Original release
- Network: GMA Network
- Release: January 27 – March 28, 2014

Paraiso Ko'y Ikaw (transl. my paradise is you / international title: My Paradise) is a 2014 Philippine television drama romance series broadcast by GMA Network. Directed by Joyce E. Bernal, it stars Kim Rodriguez and Kristoffer Martin. It premiered on January 27, 2014, on the network's Telebabad line up. The series concluded on March 28, 2014, with a total of 45 episodes.

== Cast and characters ==
Lead cast

- Kim Rodriguez as Josephine E. Rodrigo
- Kristofer Martin as Christopher "Topher" Ilustre Rosales / Tupe Carriedo

Supporting cast

- Phytos Ramirez as Brix Ilustre / Brix Castillo
- Joyce Ching as Francheska "Cheska" Bartolome Rodrigo
- G. Toengi as Regina Ilustre-Verdadero
- Gabby Eigenmann as Edward Rodrigo
- Jessa Zaragoza as Yvette Bartolome-Rodrigo
- Sheryl Cruz as Teresa Enriquez-Rodrigo
- Dianne Medina as Elizabeth Castillo
- Neil Ryan Sese as Roberto "Berto" Rosales
- Janno Gibbs as Salvador "Badong / Bads" Carriedo
- Maricel Morales as Celia "Cel" Carriedo
- Ynez Veneracion as Sonya Estrella
- Joey Marquez as Artemio Estrella
- Irene Celebre as Herminia Rodrigo
- Bubbles Paraiso as Alicia Rodrigo-Alfonso
- Julie Lee as Anne Enriquez

Guest cast

- Lauren Young as younger Teresa
- Yassi Pressman as younger Yvette
- Ashley Ortega as younger Regina
- Jeric Gonzales as younger Edward
- Zandra Summer as younger Elizabeth
- Arkin Del Rosario as younger Berto

== Ratings ==
According to AGB Nielsen Philippines' Mega Manila household television ratings, the pilot episode of Paraiso Ko'y Ikaw earned an 11.5% rating. The final episode scored a 12% rating.
