= Kiko Estrada =

Filipino actor (born 1992)

- Born: Jason Joseph Francis Carlos Diaz Ejercito; June 4, 1992 (age 34); Manila, Philippines
- Other name: Kiko
- Education: Colegio San Agustin; De La Salle–College of Saint Benilde
- Occupation: Actor
- Years active: 2011–present
- Agents: Sparkle (2011–2012, 2014–2018); Star Magic (2012–2014, 2019–2022); ALV Talent Circuit (2014–present); Viva Artist Agency (2022–present)
- Known for: Annaliza; Bagong Umaga; Lumuhod Ka Sa Lupa; Totoy Bato
- Parents: Gary Estrada; Cheska Diaz
- Family: Ejercito family; Paquito Diaz (grandfather); Romy Diaz (granduncle); Joko Diaz (uncle)

Jason Joseph Francis Carlos Diaz Ejercito (Tagalog pronunciation: [ʔɛˌhɛːɾ.sɪˈto]; born June 4, 1992) popularly known as Kiko Estrada, is a Filipino actor who is best known for his role in Tween Hearts on GMA Network before he transferred to ABS-CBN, where he appeared in Angelito: Ang Bagong Yugto and Annaliza. In 2014, he moved back to GMA Network, where he appeared on several television dramas.

== Early life and background ==
Estrada was born in Manila. His mother, Cheska Diaz is a former actress, and his father, Gary Estrada, is an actor who also serves as board member of Quezon Province. He is the grandson of Paquito Diaz and George Estregan.

In 2021, Estrada choose to be tattooed with a memorial butterfly in honour of his grandfather who earlier lived as dweller under a Mexico, Pampanga bridge.

His parents have separated and each remarried, and he has several younger half-siblings. Of these, he has three half-sisters—Garielle Bernice, Garianna Beatrice and Gianna Bettina—from his father's present wife, Bernadette Allyson, and he has a half-brother, Stefan, and a half-sister, Gabrielle Alexi, from his mother's present husband, Carlos Morales.

Estrada went to high school at Colegio San Agustin, he attended college at College of St. Benilde, where he enrolled in the diplomatic affairs program and he played a former college basketball team of College of St. Benilde. His parents were the main force that urged him to go into show business. He began acting lessons in ABS-CBN's Star Magic in 2010.

Estrada was in a relationship with former Kapamilya and now Kapuso actress Devon Seron, but then confirmed their split in April 2021. Also has previous relationship with Barbie Forteza. He was previously in a relationship with fellow Kapamilya actress, Heaven Peralejo.

== Acting career ==
In 2011, Estrada's first appearance was in Reel Love: Tween Hearts. He played a supporting role in the youth-oriented television series and he teamed up with Barbie Forteza. The show ended in June 2012.

In 2012, four months after Tween Hearts ended, Estrada moved to ABS-CBN for non-contractual acting. In his new station, his first acting stint was a supporting role in noontime television series, Angelito: Ang Bagong Yugto. The series ended in December 2012.

In 2013, Estrada formally signed a contract with ABS-CBN and started his time at the station by landing a role in Asia's longest drama anthology Maalaala Mo Kaya in the episode "Krus" where he was cast as the leading man of Julia Montes. He was also part of the remake of Annaliza where he played a supporting role.

In July 2013, Estrada announced his first foray into the movie world with a movie called Chasing Boulevards with co-star Kim Rodriguez and Teejay Marquez. He also appeared in Minute to Win It as a contestant joining the team of Star Magic Circle 2013.

In 2014, Estrada was originally part of the main cast of Mirabella as Julia Barretto's leading man but was later replaced by Enrique Gil and Sam Concepcion. After months of hiatus he came back and signed an exclusive contract with GMA Network via Strawberry Lane. He is paired with his Chasing Boulevard co-star Kim Rodriguez. He also played a callboy who learned about his father's true identity after his own father became his customer in Magpakailanman.

In November 2018, he became part of ABS-CBN's show Pamilya Ko a month after his contract with GMA Network expired.

In October 2020, he landed a lead role and became part of ABS-CBN's show Bagong Umaga. He was paired with fellow Kapamilya actress Michelle Vito.

== Personal life ==
Estrada is the ex-boyfriend of Devon Seron. He confirmed their breakup last April 2021. Months after their breakup, the actor confirmed that he is dating Heaven Peralejo. Estrada and Peralejo broke up this year.

On February 1, 2022, Janelle Lewis, Miss World Philippines 2021 2nd Princess, confirmed dating Estrada, a few months after the Heaven Peralejo breakup.

== Acting credits ==
=== Film ===
Key
†	Denotes films that have not yet been released

Kiko Estrada's film credits with year of release, film titles and roles
Year	Title	Role	Ref.
2013	Chasing Boulevards	Kiko Flores	
2014	Dilim	Nelson	
2016	Diyos-diyosan	—N/a	
2017	Pwera Usog	Quintin	
2018	My Fairy Tail Love Story	DJ Ethan	
2018	Walwal	Marco	
2019	Bato	Cadet Ronald	
2019	Man in My Dreams	Rafa	
2019	Promdi	Fernie	
2021	My Stepmother's Lover	Eric	
2022	Maid in Malacañang	Tommy Manotoc	
2022	Sitio Diablo	Bullet	
2022	Us x Her	Dave	
2022	Laruan	Geoff	
2023	Balik Taya	Pip	
2023	Sapul	Isidro Ticson	
2023	Bela Luna	Arnold	
2023	Panibugho	Felipe	
2024	G! LU	Carlos	
2024	40	Archie	
2025	Manila's Finest	Carmelo de Leon	

=== Television ===
Key
†	Denotes shows that have not yet been aired

Kilo Estrada's television credits with year of release, title(s) and role
Year	Title	Role	Ref.
2011–2012	Reel Love Presents: Tween Hearts	Kevin Del Mundo	
2012	Angelito: Ang Bagong Yugto	Leo Samaniego	
2012–2014; 2019–present	ASAP	Himself – Performer / co-host	
2013	Maalaala Mo Kaya: Krus	Rowell	
2013	Maalaala Mo Kaya: Telebisyon	Greg	
2013–2014	Annaliza	Bart Dimaguiba	
2014	Magpakailanman: Pinutol na Kaligayahan: The Lito and Lenly Bayabados Story	JB	
2014	Yagit	Pipo	
2014	Magpakailanman: Ang Lihim ng Aking Ama	Ram	
2014	More Than Words	Philip	
2014–2015	Strawberry Lane	Paulino "Paul" Dizon	
2015	Kailan Ba Tama ang Mali?	Martin	
2015	Magpakailanman: Kapatid sa Ina: The Jason Delgado and Alvin Fontanilla Story	Jason	
2015	Wagas: May Forever: Carding & Lilian Love Story	young Carding	
2015	My Mother's Secret	Craig De Leon	
2015	Wagas: Terry and Jonjon Love Story	Jonjon	
2015	Karelasyon: Utol	Julius	
2015	Beautiful Strangers	Charles Frestame	
2016	Princess in the Palace	Kiko Castro	
2016	That's My Amboy	Patrick Almelda	
2016	Sinungaling Mong Puso	Jason Villafuerte Aguirre	
2017	Mulawin vs. Ravena	Rafael Montenegro	
2017	Wagas: May Deadline Nga ba Ang Pag-ibig?	Jeff	
2017	Alyas Robin Hood	Iking	
2017	Magpakailanman: Nika Manika: The Possessed Doll	Jay	
2018	My Guitar Princess	Justin Garcia	
2018	Magpakailanman: Asawa Ko ang Bayaw Ko	Mark	
2018	Tadhana: Panganay	Rodel	
2018	Daddy's Gurl	Bodjie	
2018	Wagas: Nakikita ng puso: The Obet & Rowena Gorgoles Love Story	Obet	
2018–2019	Ika-5 Utos	Emilio "Leo" Buenaventura Jr.	
2019	Maalaala Mo Kaya: White Ribbon	Jason Marvin	
2019	Maalaala Mo Kaya: Kadena	Kirby Manzon	
2019	Ipaglaban Mo: Alegasyon	Michael	
2019–2020	Pamilya Ko	Bernardo "Beri" Mabunga	
2020–2021	Bagong Umaga	Daniel "Otep" Jacinto Jr.	
2022	Maalaala Mo Kaya: Singsing	Ralph Landicho	
2023	Kung Hindi Lang Tayo Sumuko	Derrick	
2023	For the Love	—N/a	
2024–2025	Eat Bulaga!	Himself / Guest	
2024–2025	Lumuhod Ka sa Lupa	Norman dela Cruz / Abraham Espiritu	
2025–2026	Totoy Bato	Totoy Bato	

== Accolades ==
Year	Association	Category	Work	Result	Ref.
2015	63rd FAMAS Awards	German Moreno Youth Achievement Award	—N/a	Won	
2017	World Class Excellence Japan Awards	Outstanding New Best Actor	Sinungaling Mong Puso	Won	
