= Bagong Umaga =

2020–21 Philippine television drama series

- Title card
- Also known as: New Beginnings
- Genre: Family drama Romance; Melodrama
- Created by: Mel Mendoza del Rosario
- Written by: Denise O'Hara; Margarette Labrador; Michael Bryan Transfiguracion; Mark Gopez; Erica Bautista
- Directed by: Carlo Po Artillaga; Paco A. Sta. Maria
- Starring: Tony Labrusca; Barbie Imperial; Kiko Estrada; Michelle Vito; Yves Flores; Heaven Peralejo
- Music by: Cesar Francis S. Concio
- Opening theme: "Bagong Umaga" by Agsunta (2020–2021); "Bagong Umaga" by KZ Tandingan (2021)
- Composer: Agsunta
- Country of origin: Philippines
- Original language: Filipino
- No. of seasons: 1
- No. of episodes: 129 (list of episodes)

Production
- Executive producers: Carlo L. Katigbak; Cory V. Vidanes; Laurenti M. Dyogi; Ruel S. Bayani
- Producers: Rizza Gonzales Ebriega; Fe Catherine DV Ancheta; Edgar Joseph Johnson Mallari; Minelle Nielo Espiritu
- Production location: Metro Manila, Philippines
- Editors: Aries Pascual; Bernie Diasanta
- Running time: 22 minutes
- Production company: RGE Drama Unit

Original release
- Network: Kapamilya Channel
- Release: October 26, 2020 – April 30, 2021

Bagong Umaga (International title: New Beginnings / transl. New Morning) is a Philippine television drama series broadcast by Kapamilya Channel. Directed by Carlo Po Artillaga and Paco A. Sta. Maria, it stars Heaven Peralejo, Tony Labrusca, Barbie Imperial, Kiko Estrada, Michelle Vito and Yves Flores. It aired on the network's Kapamilya Gold line up and worldwide on TFC from October 26, 2020, to April 30, 2021.

The series is streaming online on YouTube.

== Plot ==
Diana was overwhelmed with grief after being denied a medical operation on her newborn child, resulting in the baby's death. She then sets out to inflict those she claims to be responsible for her child's death: the Veradonas. Thus, Joanna Magbanua and Catherine Veradona were the infants switched by Diana in the nursery at Buencorazon Hospital. It is later revealed that she swapped two more infants the same night: Raphael Florentino and Eduardo Ponce.

The Magbanuas, Veradonas, and Florentinos eventually learn that their infants were switched at the hospital, changing the courses of their lives upon learning of their children's true identities.

== Cast ==
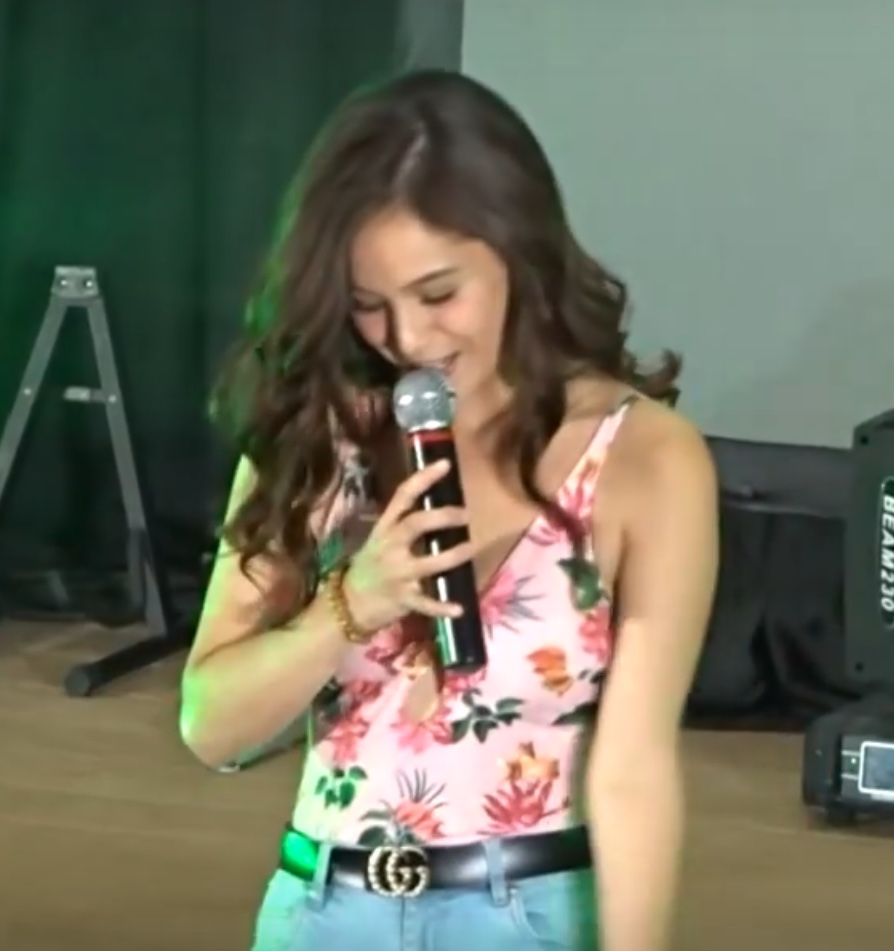
Barbie Imperial portrays Catherine "Cai" Veradona/Catherine Magbanua

=== Main cast ===
- Tony Labrusca as Raphael "Ely" Florentino / Raphael Ponce
- Barbie Imperial as Catherine "Cai" B. Veradona / Catherine Magbanua†
- Kiko Estrada as Daniel "Otep" Jacinta Jr.
- Michelle Vito as Agnes "Angge" Delos Santos / Bella Silang
- Yves Flores as Eduardo "Dodong" Ponce / Eduardo Florentino
- Heaven Peralejo as Joanna "Tisay" Magbanua / Joanna B. Veradona

=== Supporting cast ===
- Rio Locsin as Hilda Delgado-Veradona
- Glydel Mercado as Diana Silang-Jacinta†
- Sunshine Cruz as Dra. Margaret "Maggie" Buencorazon-Veradona
- Cris Villanueva as Dr. Christian "Ian" D. Veradona
- Keempee de Leon as Joselito "Jose" Magbanua
- Nikki Valdez as Monica Magbanua
- Bernadette Allyson as Irene Florentino
- Richard Quan as Matthew L. Florentino
- Ali Abinal as Gabriel "Gab" Florentino†
- Peewee O’Hara as Pepita "Lola Pet" Delos Santos
- Moi Bien as Gigi Santos

=== Guest cast ===
- Junjun Quintana as Jude M. Silang
- Jenny Miller as Jenny Ponce†
- Priscilla Meirelles as Olivia Chavez
- Johnny Revilla as Hernando Buencorazon
- Giovanni Baldisseri as Wally Ramos

== Production ==
The project was first unveiled on June 12, 2020, with a working title Cara Y Cruz. Tony Labrusca, Julia Barretto, Loisa Andalio, Ronnie Alonte and Marco Gumabao were initially cast for the leading roles.

On September 30, Julia Barretto confirmed that she was no longer part of the project after being transferred to Viva Artists Agency and she was replaced by Heaven Peralejo, along with Loisa Andalio and Ronnie Alonte, who are now co-managed by KreativDen. The series was later renamed to Bagong Umaga. From March 29–31 and April 5, 2021, the series aired replays under the title Bagong Umaga: Rewind.

Following the conclusion of this series, Bagong Umaga was the last original series to be aired on Kapamilya Gold until its revival in 2023.

== Timeslot block ==
This was the first and only series to be aired on Kapamilya Gold (on Kapamilya Channel and A2Z) in the aftermath of the ABS-CBN shutdown and franchise denial, amidst the then-lingering restrictions in response to the COVID-19 pandemic in the Philippines. This was also the only series to not be aired on TV5 following the signing of the blocktime agreement with the network in 2021 (which only covered the Primetime Bida lineup in airing ABS-CBN drama series on TV5 from March 8, 2021, until the return of the Kapamilya Gold lineup on Kapamilya Channel and A2Z and the premiere of the said afternoon lineup on TV5 on July 25, 2023)

Following its conclusion, its timeslot was eventually filled by reruns of previously aired ABS-CBN drama series (starting with Dolce Amore) until the block's return to fresh offerings on July 25, 2023, with the series, Pira-Pirasong Paraiso, a collaboration between the network and TV5 that would occupy its previous timeslot, along with Nag-aapoy na Damdamin.
