= Lumuhod Ka sa Lupa =

2024–25 Philippine television drama series

- Title card
- Genre: Action drama
- Based on: Lumuhod Ka Sa Lupa by Manuel "Fyke" Cinco
- Directed by: Albert S. Langitan; Roderick P. Lindayag
- Starring: Kiko Estrada; Heaven Peralejo; Rhen Escaño; Sid Lucero; Gardo Versoza
- Opening theme: "Lumuhod Ka Sa Lupa" by Ezro
- Composer: Jaworski Garcia
- Country of origin: Philippines
- Original language: Filipino
- No. of seasons: 4
- No. of episodes: 273

Production
- Executive producer: Vic del Rosario Jr.
- Producers: Vincent del Rosario III; Valerie S. del Rosario; Veronique del Rosario-Corpus
- Camera setup: Single-camera
- Running time: 27–37 minutes
- Production companies: Studio Viva; Sari-Sari Channel

Original release
- Network: TV5
- Release: April 8, 2024 – May 2, 2025

Lumuhod Ka Sa Lupa (transl. kneel on the ground, international title: Just Revenge) is a Philippine television drama action series broadcast by TV5. Directed by Albert S. Langitan and Roderick P. Lindayag, it stars Kiko Estrada, Sarah Lahbati, Sid Lucero, Rhen Escaño and Gardo Versoza. The series is based on the 1986 film of the same title. It aired the network's Hapon Champion line up and worldwide on Kapatid Channel from April 8, 2024 to May 2, 2025, replacing Wanted sa Radyo and was replaced by Totoy Bato.

== Plot ==
Norman Dela Cruz aims of becoming a lawyer. Norman's life takes a dramatic turn when a land dispute between his mother Tacing and her estranged brother Benito Balmores ends in tragedy. Determined to avenge his mother, Norman finds himself conflicted as he falls for Benito's daughter, Mercy Balmores, who is now married to Miguel Aguirre. As Norman, now known as the successful lawyer Abraham Espiritu, grapples with his desire for revenge and his suppressed feelings for Mercy, the boundaries between justice and love blur.

== Cast and characters ==
=== Final ===
Main cast

- Kiko Estrada as Norman dela Cruz-Balmores / Atty. Abraham Espiritu-Dela Cruz
- Rhen Escaño as Jane Rosario
- Sid Lucero as Miguel Aguirre-Balmores
- Gardo Versoza as Judge Benito Balmores

Supporting cast

- Andrew Muhlach as Robert "Obet" Aguilar
- Phoebe Walker as Rachel Santino
- Billy Villeta as Pido dela Cruz
- Althea Ruedas as Fatima Aguirre / Fatima dela Cruz / Fatima Balmores

Guest cast

- Awra Briguela as Norman Mangusin

=== Former ===
Main cast

- Sarah Lahbati as Mercy Balmores / Mercy Dela Cruz
- Heaven Peralejo as Hope Soldado
- Marco Gallo as Baste Soldado

Supporting cast

- Mark Anthony Fernandez as Brando Malvar
- Azi Acosta as Elizabeth Reyes / Elizabeth Balmores
- Rose Van Ginkel as Cherry dela Cruz / Strawberry
- Jeffrey Hidalgo as Rudy Magsino
- Bart Guingona as Mario Aguirre
- Jamilla Obispo as Nina
- Annika Co as Fatima Aguirre / Fatima Dela Cruz
- Mon Confiado as Marcus Soldado
- Andre Yllana as Tom Aguirre-Dela Cruz
- Ashley Diaz as Bernice "Bea" Magsino-Dela Cruz
- JC Tiuseco as Atoy Santos
- Ryza Cenon as Christina Maceda-Balmores
- Gene Padilla as Bobby "Kap Obet" Aguilar
- Angela Morena as Mariz
- Nor Domingo as Bentio Wong
- Francis Mata as Domingo
- Yogo Singh as Utoy
- CJ Caparas as Manny
- Manu Respall as Warden

Guest cast

- Ana Abad Santos as Tacing dela Cruz
- Joko Diaz as Abraham "Abra" Espiritu
- Jeric Raval as Governor Lucas Rodante
- Andrea del Rosario as Eunice "Mother Eu" Aguirre
- Lander de Vera-Perez as Manong
- Niño Muhlach as Bacha
- Levy Ignacio as Leonardo Uy
- Vino Gonzales as Gatsby
- Jun Nayra as Emilio Sampaga
- Mark Dionisio as Carlos Aguirre
- Dwin Araza as Stephen, Manager of Valencia Golf Club
- Heidi Arima as Rosario Business Club
- Melissa Tongol as Rosario Business Club
- Rani Caldoza as Rosario Business Club
- John Go as Oliver Gonzaga
- Allan Villafuerte as Mr. Florentino
- Floyd Tena as Voltaire Asinas
- Mario Manabat as Chairman Rodel
- Jordan Hong as Dreyfus / Alamid
- Vonz Lopez as Balat
- Joseph Ison as Yosef
- Rommel Velasquez as Jess Sta. Ana
- Yutaka Yamakawa as Doctor
- Jorel Ramirez as Rodante's Bodyguard
- Dax Augustus as Henchman
- Rhett Romero as De Castro
- Rhed Bustamante as young Christina Maceda
- Evelyn Santos as Lydia
- Dylan Menor as Young Manny

== Episodes ==
Lumuhod Ka Sa Lupa episodes
No.	Title	Original release date	AGB Nielsen Ratings (NUTAM People)
1	"Unang Laban"	April 8, 2024	1.3%
2	"Nanay Tacing"	April 9, 2024	1.3%
3	"Kabayaran"	April 10, 2024	1.7%
4	"Batas ng Puso"	April 11, 2024	1.7%
5	"Pagtatagpo"	April 12, 2024	1.4%
6	"Bilanggo"	April 15, 2024	1.2%
7	"Pag-asa"	April 16, 2024	1.5%
8	"Abraham Espiritu"	April 17, 2024	1.2%
9	"Imbitasyon"	April 18, 2024	1.7%
10	"Paghaharap"	April 19, 2024	1.3%
11	"Blind Truth"	April 22, 2024	1.6%
12	"Kutob"	April 23, 2024	1.4%
13	"Ungusan"	April 24, 2024	1.4%
14	"Takas"	April 25, 2024	1.3%
15	"Duda"	April 26, 2024	1.4%
16	"Sulyap"	April 29, 2024	1.4%
17	"Kumpisal"	April 30, 2024	1.2%
18	"Ebidensya"	May 1, 2024	1.5%
19	"Traydor"	May 2, 2024	1.2%
20	"Lantad"	May 3, 2024	1.1%
21	"Luksa"	May 6, 2024	1.2%
22	"Laban ng Babae"	May 7, 2024	1.3%
23	"Walang Takot"	May 8, 2024	1.2%
24	"Boses"	May 9, 2024	1.3%
25	"Gamitan"	May 10, 2024	1.4%
26	"Kaso"	May 13, 2024	1.4%
27	"Desperado"	May 14, 2024	1.4%
28	"Pasabog"	May 15, 2024	1.4%
29	"Operasyon"	May 16, 2024	1.3%
30	"Lihim"	May 17, 2024	1.5%
31	"Pagsiyasat"	May 20, 2024	1.1%
32	"Kumpirmasyon"	May 21, 2024	1.1%
33	"Pagtatapat"	May 22, 2024	1.2%
34	"Pagbaliktad"	May 23, 2024	1.3%
35	"Dispatsa"	May 24, 2024	1.3%
36	"Pagtakas"	May 27, 2024	1.4%
37	"Pagsamo"	May 28, 2024	1.3%
38	"Pagsubok"	May 29, 2024	N/A
39	"Test of Loyalty"	May 30, 2024	N/A
40	"Bunyag"	May 31, 2024	N/A
41	"Iringan"	June 3, 2024	N/A
42	"Balik-tanaw"	June 4, 2024	N/A
43	"Star Witness"	June 5, 2024	N/A
44	"Panibugho"	June 6, 2024	N/A
45	"Sigalot"	June 7, 2024	N/A
46	"Salakay"	June 10, 2024	N/A
47	"Puntirya"	June 11, 2024	N/A
48	"Blind Loyalty"	June 12, 2024	N/A
49	"Tirador"	June 13, 2024	N/A
50	"Hari-harian"	June 14, 2024	N/A

Lumuhod Ka Sa Lupa: Bagong Yugto episodes
No. overall	No. in season	Title	Original release date	AGB Nielsen Ratings (NUTAM People)
51	1	"Bagong Yugto"	June 24, 2024	N/A
52	2	"Mastermind"	June 25, 2024	N/A
53	3	"Annulment"	June 26, 2024	N/A
54	4	"Tunay na Ama"	June 27, 2024	N/A
55	5	"Dehado"	June 28, 2024	N/A
56	6	"Fake Hero"	July 1, 2024	N/A
57	7	"Manipula"	July 2, 2024	N/A
58	8	"Kasunduan"	July 3, 2024	N/A
59	9	"Riot"	July 4, 2024	N/A
60	10	"Pangontra"	July 5, 2024	N/A
61	11	"Bihag"	July 8, 2024	N/A
62	12	"Search Warrant"	July 9, 2024	N/A
63	13	"Search Warrant"	July 10, 2024	N/A
64	14	"Kampihan"	July 11, 2024	N/A
65	15	"Utakan"	July 12, 2024	N/A
66	16	"Sagip"	July 15, 2024	N/A
67	17	"Damdamin"	July 16, 2024	N/A
68	18	"Alinlangan"	July 17, 2024	N/A
69	19	"Kadugo"	July 18, 2024	N/A
70	20	"Power"	July 19, 2024	N/A
71	21	"Take Over"	July 22, 2024	N/A
72	22	"Pag-amin"	July 23, 2024	N/A
73	23	"Sawi"	July 24, 2024	N/A
74	24	"Panggulo"	July 25, 2024	N/A
75	25	"Buwelta"	July 26, 2024	N/A
76	26	"Bagsik"	July 29, 2024	4.8%
77	27	"Kastigo"	July 30, 2024	N/A
78	28	"Pugante"	July 31, 2024	N/A
79	29	"Pangamba"	August 1, 2024	N/A
80	30	"Kontrolado"	August 2, 2024	N/A
81	31	"Tiwala"	August 5, 2024	N/A
82	32	"Prinsipyo"	August 6, 2024	N/A
83	33	"Konsensya"	August 7, 2024	N/A
84	34	"Alyansa"	August 8, 2024	N/A
85	35	"Tindig"	August 9, 2024	N/A
86	36	"Mothering"	August 12, 2024	N/A
87	37	"Sanib Pwersa"	August 13, 2024	N/A
88	38	"Sabotahe"	August 14, 2024	N/A
89	39	"Pagkakataon"	August 15, 2024	N/A
90	40	"Paghimok"	August 16, 2024	N/A
91	41	"Paramdam"	August 19, 2024	N/A
92	42	"Lusob"	August 20, 2024	N/A
93	43	"Responde"	August 21, 2024	N/A
94	44	"Tatsulok"	August 22, 2024	N/A
95	45	"Blackmail"	August 23, 2024	N/A
96	46	"Babala"	August 26, 2024	N/A
97	47	"Pagsangga"	August 27, 2024	N/A
98	48	"Troll Farm"	August 28, 2024	N/A
99	49	"Lamat"	August 29, 2024	N/A
100	50	"Hinala"	August 30, 2024	N/A
101	51	"Pag-usig"	September 2, 2024	N/A
102	52	"Pandaraya"	September 3, 2024	N/A
103	53	"Pananakot"	September 4, 2024	N/A
104	54	"Salba"	September 5, 2024	N/A
105	55	"Pagtutuos"	September 6, 2024	N/A
106	56	"Kapit"	September 9, 2024	N/A
107	57	"Takot"	September 10, 2024	N/A
108	58	"Asintado"	September 11, 2024	N/A
109	59	"Hitman"	September 12, 2024	N/A
110	60	"Laglagan"	September 13, 2024	N/A
111	61	"Prayoridad"	September 16, 2024	N/A
112	62	"Pagtanggap"	September 17, 2024	N/A
113	63	"Hikayat"	September 18, 2024	N/A
114	64	"Mass Grave"	September 19, 2024	N/A
115	65	"Gahol"	September 20, 2024	N/A
116	66	"Protesta"	September 23, 2024	N/A
117	67	"Balat-kayo"	September 24, 2024	N/A
118	68	"Hinanakit"	September 25, 2024	N/A
119	69	"Sabwatan"	September 26, 2024	N/A
120	70	"Moralidad"	September 27, 2024	N/A
121	71	"Lihis"	September 30, 2024	N/A
122	72	"Kantian"	October 1, 2024	N/A
123	73	"Tanim"	October 2, 2024	N/A
124	74	"Sumbatan"	October 3, 2024	N/A
125	75	"Pasabog"	October 4, 2024	4.6%
126	76	"Sumbatan"	October 7, 2024	4.5%
127	77	"Eskapo"	October 8, 2024	4.6%
128	78	"Gigil"	October 9, 2024	4.8%
129	79	"Bitag"	October 10, 2024	4.0%
130	80	"Bintang"	October 11, 2024	3.0%
131	81	"Atake"	October 14, 2024	3.9%
132	82	"Salpukan"	October 15, 2024	5.23%
133	83	"Lugmok"	October 16, 2024	3.9%
134	84	"Pagkamuhi"	October 17, 2024	4.5%
135	85	"Unang Pagdating"	October 18, 2024	3.6%
136	86	"Peligro"	October 21, 2024	4.6
137	87	"Tugis"	October 22, 2024	4.7%
138	88	"Walang Iwanan"	October 23, 2024	4.1%
139	89	"Tagisan"	October 24, 2024	4.7%
140	90	"Pamilya"	October 25, 2024	4.7%
141	91	"Balik Loob"	October 28, 2024	N/A
142	92	"Engkwento"	October 29, 2024	N/A
143	93	"Katotohanan"	October 30, 2024	N/A
145	95	"Sukdulan"	October 31, 2024	N/A
146	96	"Pangarap"	November 1, 2024	N/A
147	97	"Pamamaalam"	November 4, 2024	N/A
148	98	"Hinagpis"	November 5, 2024	N/A
149	99	"Gunita"	November 6, 2024	N/A
150	100	"Desidido"	November 7, 2024	N/A
151	101	"Sariling Laban"	November 8, 2024	N/A
152	102	"Pakiramdam"	November 11, 2024	N/A
153	103	"Ngitngit"	November 12, 2024	N/A
154	104	"Paniningil"	November 13, 2024	N/A
155	105	"Pighati"	November 14, 2024	N/A
156	106	"Ikalawang Pagdating"	November 15, 2024	N/A
157	107	"Bagong Pag-Asa"	November 18, 2024	4.9%
158	108	"Kananag Kamay"	November 19, 2024	5.4%
159	109	"Abswelto"	November 20, 2024	4.3%
160	110	"Pagtakpan"	November 21, 2024	3.2%
161	111	"Human Trafficking"	November 22, 2024	N/A
162	112	"Banggaan"	November 25, 2024	N/A
163	113	"Pananabik"	November 26, 2024	N/A
163	113	"Linlang"	November 27, 2024	N/A
164	114	"Dagok"	November 28, 2024	N/A
165	115	"Angkin"	November 29, 2024	N/A
166	116	"Dalamhat"	December 2, 2024	N/A
167	117	"Tangka"	December 3, 2024	N/A
168	118	"Pagtakip"	December 4, 2024	N/A
169	119	"Panganib"	December 5, 2024	N/A
170	120	"Pusong Bato"	December 6, 2024	N/A
171	121	"Usisa"	December 9, 2024	N/A
172	122	"Paglipas"	December 10, 2024	N/A
173	123	"Hands of Power"	December 11, 2024	N/A
174	124	"Tuso"	December 12, 2024	N/A
175	125	"Kubli"	December 13, 2024	N/A
176	126	"Pigil"	December 16, 2024	N/A
177	127	"Pagtindig"	December 17, 2024	N/A
178	128	"Suspetsa"	December 18, 2024	N/A
179	129	"Palyado"	December 19, 2024	N/A
180	130	"Paglalapit"	December 20, 2024	N/A
181	131	"Galaiti"	December 23, 2024	N/A
182	132	"Parusa"	December 24, 2024	N/A
183	133	"Hadlang"	December 25, 2024	N/A
184	134	"Bagong"	December 26, 2024	N/A
185	135	"Senyales"	December 27, 2024	N/A
186	136	"Pananaw"	December 30, 2024	N/A
187	137	"Kumbinis"	December 31, 2024	N/A
188	138	"Ganti"	January 1, 2025	N/A
189	139	"Sakripisyo"	January 2, 2025	N/A
190	140	"Bistado"	January 3, 2025	N/A
191	141	"Paninindigan"	January 6, 2025	N/A
192	142	"Kontra"	January 7, 2025	N/A
193	143	"Tanong"	January 8, 2025	N/A
194	144	"Kalaban"	January 9, 2025	N/A
195	145	"Kahinaan"	January 10, 2025	N/A
196	146	"Mensahe"	January 13, 2025	3.9%
197	147	"Ganid"	January 14, 2025	4.3%
198	148	"Badya"	January 15, 2025	3.7%
199	149	"Sugod"	January 16, 2025	3.5%
199	149	"Giyera"	January 17, 2025	3.5%
200	150	"Falled Men"	January 18, 2025	5.2%
201	151	"Poot"	January 20, 2025	N/A
202	152	"Pagdating"	January 21, 2025	N/A
203	153	"Hudyak"	January 22, 2025	N/A
204	154	"Habulan"	January 23, 2025	N/A
205	155	"Proteksyon"	January 24, 2025	N/A
206	156	"Proteksyon"	January 27, 2025	N/A
207	157	"Kabutihan"	January 28, 2025	N/A
208	158	"Para sa Bayan"	January 29, 2025	N/A
209	159	"Pagkakaisa"	January 30, 2025	N/A
210	160	"Ugnayan"	January 31, 2025	N/A
209	159	"Pagkakaisa"	January 30, 2025	N/A
211	161	"Dama"	February 3, 2025	N/A
212	162	"Katulad"	February 4, 2025	N/A
213	163	"Paghahanda"	February 5, 2025	N/A
214	164	"Plan B"	February 6, 2025	N/A
215	165	"Katauhan"	February 7, 2025	N/A
216	166	"Patibong"	February 10, 2025	N/A
217	167	"Payagin"	February 11, 2025	N/A
218	168	"Banta"	February 12, 2025	N/A
219	169	"Anak"	February 13, 2025	N/A
220	170	"Pagalala"	February 14, 2025	N/A
221	171	"Kaagaw"	February 17, 2025	N/A
222	172	"Pananakop"	February 18, 2025	N/A
223	173	"Alas"	February 19, 2025	N/A
224	174	"Sugatang"	February 20, 2025	N/A
225	175	"Bawian"	February 21, 2025	N/A
226	176	"Duwelo"	February 24, 2025	N/A
227	177	"Paglisan"	February 25, 2025	N/A
228	178	"Dalamhati"	February 26, 2025	N/A
229	179	"Halaga"	February 27, 2025	N/A
230	180	"Salag"	February 28, 2025	N/A
231	181	"Habilin"	March 3, 2025	N/A
232	182	"Bangungot"	March 4, 2025	N/A
233	183	"Special Memories"	March 5, 2025	N/A
234	184	"Manman"	March 6, 2025	N/A
235	185	"Fake News"	March 7, 2025	N/A
236	186	"Byahe"	March 10, 2025	N/A
237	187	"Paraya"	March 11, 2025	N/A
238	188	"Banta"	March 12, 2025	N/A
239	189	"Sangga"	March 13, 2025	N/A
240	190	"Ana, Ina Anak"	March 14, 2025	N/A
241	191	"Rebelasyon"	March 17, 2025	N/A
242	192	"Rescue"	March 18, 2025	N/A
243	193	"Kabutihang"	March 19, 2025	N/A
244	194	"Panaghoy"	March 20, 2025	N/A
245	195	"Sugatan"	March 21, 2025	N/A
246	196	"Palit Panig"	March 24, 2025	N/A
247	197	"Whistle Blower"	March 25, 2025	N/A
248	198	"Sangang Daan"	March 26, 2025	N/A
249	199	"Cornered"	March 27, 2025	N/A
250	200	"Brothers"	March 28, 2025	N/A
251	201	"Hatol"	March 31, 2025	N/A
252	202	"Unang Halik"	April 1, 2025	N/A
253	203	"Siklab"	April 2, 2025	N/A
254	204	"Selebrasyon"	April 3, 2025	N/A
255	205	"Pagharap"	April 4, 2025	N/A
256	206	"Pardon"	April 7, 2025	N/A
257	207	"Kalayaan"	April 8, 2025	N/A
258	208	"Kasal"	April 9, 2025	N/A
259	209	"Vows"	April 10, 2025	N/A
260	210	"Kidnap"	April 11, 2025	N/A
261	211	"Tapatan"	April 14, 2025	N/A
262	212	"Panaginip"	April 15, 2025	N/A
263	213	"Pagkabuhay"	April 16, 2025	N/A
264	214	"Habilin"	April 21, 2025	N/A
265	215	"Ikot ng Mundo"	April 22, 2025	N/A
266	216	"Makaawa"	April 23, 2025	N/A
267	217	"Hibang"	April 24, 2025	N/A
268	218	"Pakumbaba"	April 25, 2025	N/A
269	219	"Pagsisisi"	April 28, 2025	N/A
270	220	"Kapatawaran"	April 29, 2025	N/A
272	222	"Pagpili"	May 1, 2025	N/A
273	223	"Huling Pasabog"	May 2, 2025	N/A

== Timeslot change ==
On June 24, 2024, after a week of hiatus, the series began airing on the network's TodoMax Primetime Singko line up at 7:30 pm, reducing Frontline Pilipinas airtime to an hour. Starting February 11, 2025, the series had another timeslot change, moving 45 minutes earlier at 7:15pm. Frontline Pilipinas moved to 6:00pm on the same day.
