= Sinungaling Mong Puso =

2016 Philippine television series

- Title card
- Also known as: Cruel Lies
- Genre: Drama thriller
- Based on: Sinungaling Mong Puso (1992) by Maryo J. de los Reyes
- Written by: Renei Dimla; Ana Levita Macapugay; Liberty Trinidad
- Directed by: Ricky Davao; Jules Katanyag; Jorron Monroy; Aya Topacio
- Creative director: Roy Iglesias
- Starring: Rhian Ramos; Rafael Rosell; Kiko Estrada
- Theme music composer: John Meer Vera Perez; Adonis Tabanda
- Opening theme: "Natatanging Pag-ibig" by Maricris Garcia
- Country of origin: Philippines
- Original language: Tagalog
- No. of episodes: 74 (list of episodes)

Production
- Executive producer: Lani Feliciano-Sandoval
- Producer: Jefflyn G. Abrea
- Production locations: Quezon City, Philippines
- Cinematography: Chiqui Soriano
- Editors: Vincent Valenzuela; Lawrence Villena; Kim Badayos
- Camera setup: Multiple-camera setup
- Running time: 19–28 minutes
- Production company: GMA Entertainment TV

Original release
- Network: GMA Network
- Release: July 18 – October 28, 2016

Sinungaling Mong Puso (transl. your liar heart / international title: Cruel Lies) is a 2016 Philippine television drama thriller series broadcast by GMA Network. The series is based on a 1992 Philippine film of the same title. Directed by Ricky Davao, it stars Rhian Ramos, Rafael Rosell and Kiko Estrada. It premiered on July 18, 2016, on the network's Afternoon Prime line up. The series concluded on October 28, 2016, with a total of 74 episodes.

The series is streaming online on YouTube.

== Premise ==
Clara and Roman will meet each other in a time when they are going through something. They will suddenly get along and marry each other. It is going to be a start of healing for Clara until she notices something different about Roman, who eventually turns out to be hard, skeptic and abusive. She will eventually meet a younger man, Jason who will give her the caring that she is looking for.

== Cast and characters ==
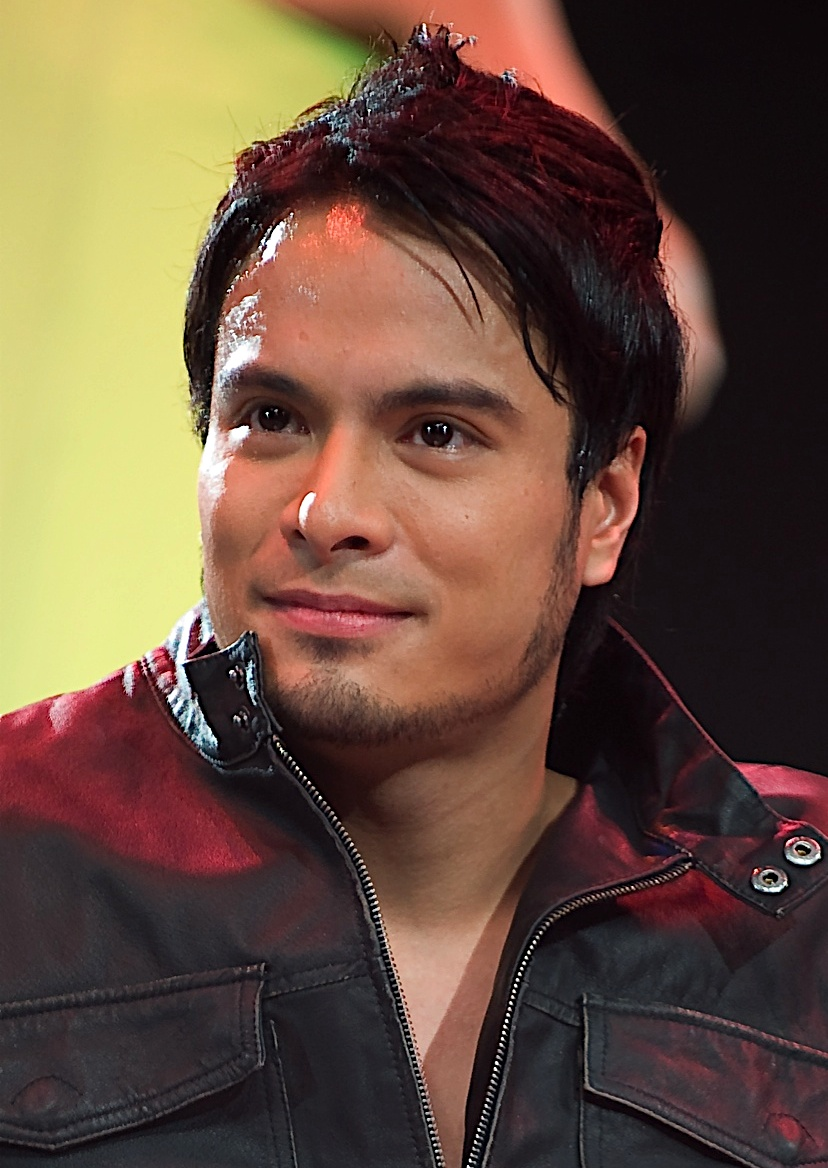
Rafael Rosell portrays Roman Aguirre.

Lead cast

- Rhian Ramos as Clara Pamintuan-Aguirre
- Rafael Rosell as Roman Labangon Aguirre
- Kiko Estrada as Jason Villafuerte Aguirre

Supporting cast

- Jazz Ocampo as Hanna Arellano-Aguirre
- Michael de Mesa as Moises Aguirre
- Glydel Mercado as Raquel Labangon-Aguirre
- Sherilyn Reyes-Tan as Liza Arellano
- Cheska Diaz as Helen Villafuerte
- JC Tiuseco as Jolo
- Gab de Leon as Vin
- Stephanie Sol as Camilla Ganzon
- Gee Canlas as Jillian

Guest cast

- Paolo Contis as Eric Salvacion
- Ryza Cenon as Leda Robles-Aguirre
- Tessbomb as Rowena "Wena"
- Kevin Sagra as Borj
- Marlann Flores as Josephine
- Karla Pambide as Lorna
- Francis Mata as Dante Ibañez
- Faith da Silva
- Nikki Co
- Beatriz Imperial
- Claire Vande as Kylie
- Ollie Espino as Larry Arellano
- Apollo Abraham
- Paolo Gamboa as Greg Villegas
- Mayen Estanero as Alma
- Afi Africa as Tony
- Wowie de Guzman as Mario Villafuerte
- Manilyn Reynes as Angelica Pamintuan
- Andrea del Rosario as Lourdes Robles
- Snooky Serna as Clara's mother
- Emilio Garcia as Clara's father
- Maey Bautista as a prisoner

== Ratings ==
According to AGB Nielsen Philippines' Mega Manila household television ratings, the pilot episode of Sinungaling Mong Puso earned a 13.4% rating. The final episode scored a 15.5% rating.

== Accolades ==
Accolades received by Sinungaling Mong Puso
Year	Award	Category	Recipient	Result	Ref.
2017	World Class Excellence Japan Awards	Outstanding New Best Actor	Kiko Estrada	Won	
