= Totoy Bato (2025 TV series) =

2025 Philippine television drama series

- Genre: Action; Drama
- Based on: Totoy Bato by Carlo J. Caparas
- Directed by: Albert Langitan; Zyro Radoc; Ambo Gonzales
- Starring: Kiko Estrada
- Opening theme: "Dagundong" by Alamat
- Country of origin: Philippines
- Original language: Filipino
- No. of seasons: 2
- No. of episodes: 252

Production
- Executive producer: Vic del Rosario
- Producers: Vincent del Rosario III; Valerie S. del Rosario; Veronique del Rosario-Corpus
- Running time: 35-50 minutes
- Production companies: MQuest Ventures; MavenPro; Sari-Sari Network, Inc.; Epik Studios; Studio Viva

Original release
- Network: TV5
- Release: May 5, 2025 – April 24, 2026

Related
- Totoy Bato (2009)

Totoy Bato is a Philippine television drama action series broadcast by TV5. The series is based on the graphic novel created by Carlo J. Caparas. Directed by Albert Langitan, Zyro Radoc, and Ambo Gonzales, it stars Kiko Estrada in the title role. It aired on the network's TodoMax Primetime Singko line up and worldwide on Kapatid Channel from May 5, 2025 to April 24, 2026, replacing Lumuhod Ka sa Lupa and was replaced by A Secret in Prague.

== Cast and characters ==
=== Final ===
Main cast

- Kiko Estrada as Alan "Totoy Bato" Monte-Perez Jr.

Supporting cast

- Claudine Barretto as Diamond Labrador
- Bea Binene as Emerald Espejo
- Diego Loyzaga as Dwayne Perez
- Cindy Miranda as Amber Castillo
- Nonie Buencamino as Father Nicolas "Nico" Monte-Perez
- Art Acuña as Don Pedro Enrique Perez-Monte
- Mon Confiado as Don Silvio Castillo
- Eula Valdez as Ruby Rocco-Perez
- Mark Anthony Fernandez as Stanley Rocco
- Joko Diaz as Alan R. Monte Sr.
- Katya Santos as Alira
- Kean Cipriano as Jasper
- Jackie Lou Blanco as Ivory Castillo
- Andrew Muhlach as Jett Javier
- Ivan Padilla as Rocky Castillo
- Billy Villeta as Dustin Donaire
- Lester Llansang as Baldo Anastacio
- Benz Sangalang as Maison Buenaflor
- Gold Aceron as Onyx Ocampo
- CJ Caparas as Alex Maningas
- Janno Gibbs as Engr. Arko Perez
- Marlo Mortel as Coby Sandoval
- Romi Sison as Emma

Guest cast

- Carlene Aguilar as Gemma Monte
- Lawrence Dela Cruz as young Totoy Bato
- Natania Guerrero as young Emerald
- Benedict Lao as young Dwayne
- Jeremiah Cruz as young Jett
- Dwayne Bialoglovski as young Dustin
- Stanley Abuloc as young Rocky

== Production ==
Principal photography commenced on April 14, 2025.
