= List of Sinungaling Mong Puso episodes =

2016 Philippine TV series

Sinungaling Mong Puso is a 2016 Philippine television drama suspense series broadcast by GMA Network. It premiered on the network's Afternoon Prime line up and worldwide on GMA Pinoy TV from July 18, 2016 to October 28, 2016, replacing Hanggang Makita Kang Muli.

Urban Luzon ratings are provided by AGB Nielsen Philippines.

== Series overview ==
Month	Episodes	Monthly Averages
Month	Episodes	Urban Luzon
July 2016	9	12.0%
August 2016	23	13.6%
September 2016	22	13.0%
October 2016	20	13.7%
Total	74	13.1%

== Episodes ==
=== July 2016 ===
Episode		Original air date	Social Media Hashtag	AGB Nielsen Urban Luzon Households in Television Homes			Ref.
Episode		Original air date	Social Media Hashtag	Rating	Timeslot Rank	Afternoon Rank	Ref.
1	Pilot	July 18, 2016	#SinungalingMongPuso	13.4%	#1	#4	
2	Gusto Kita	July 19, 2016	#SMPGustoKita	11.6%	#2	#7	
3	Umpisa ng Bangungot	July 20, 2016	#SMPUmpisaNgBangungot	12.1%	#2	#7	
4	Panganib kay Clara	July 21, 2016	#SMPPanganibKayClara	12.7%	#1	#4	
5	Bagong Kalaban	July 22, 2016	#SMPBagongKalaban	13.3%	#1	#4	
6	Sino ka, Jason?	July 26, 2016 (Note: Episode 6 did not air on July 25 during the 2016 State of the Nation Address live coverage.)	#SMPSinoKaJason	11.3%	#2	#7	
7	Simula ng Abuso	July 27, 2016	#SMPSimulaNgAbuso	11.7%	#2	#7	
8	Palaban si Clara	July 28, 2016	#SMPPalabanSiClara	11.5%	#2	#7	
9	Muling Pinagtagpo	July 29, 2016	#SMPMulingPinagtagpo	10.4%	#2	#9	

=== August 2016 ===
Episode		Original air date	Social Media Hashtag	AGB Nielsen Urban Luzon Households in Television Homes			Ref.
Episode		Original air date	Social Media Hashtag	Rating	Timeslot Rank	Afternoon Rank	Ref.
10	Tinatagong Nakaraan	August 1, 2016	#SMPTinatagongNakaraan	13.9%	#1	#4	
11	Lihim na Kaaway	August 2, 2016	#SMPLihimNaKaaway	12.5%	#2	#7	
12	Matinding Rebelasyon	August 3, 2016	#SMPMatindingRebelasyon	12.4%	#1	#5	
13	Eskandalo	August 4, 2016	#SMPEskandalo	12.1%	#1	#6	
14	Runaway Clara	August 5, 2016	#SMPRunawayClara	12.2%	#1	#5	
15	Matinding Duda	August 8, 2016	#SMPMatindingDuda	12.8%	#2	#8	
16	Banta sa Buhay	August 9, 2016	#SMPBantaSaBuhay	14.5%	#2	#8	
17	Abusadong Pagmamahal	August 10, 2016	#SMPAbusadongPagmamahal	12.4%	#2	#9	
18	Karinyo Brutal	August 11, 2016	#SMPKarinyoBrutal	13.3%	#1	#7	
19	Takas	August 12, 2016	#SMPTakas	15.1%	#1	#5	
20	Nakaw na Tingin	August 15, 2016	#SMPNakawNaTingin	14.0%	#1	#7	
21	Simula ng Ganti	August 16, 2016	#SMPSimulaNgGanti	13.8%	#1	#6	
22	Biro ng Tadhana	August 17, 2016	#SMPBiroNgTadhana	15.0%	#1	#4	
23	Kapit sa Patalim	August 18, 2016	#SMPKapitSaPatalim	14.3%	#1	#4	
24	Bugso ng Damdamin	August 19, 2016	#SMPBugsoNgDamdamin	14.2%	#1	#5	
25	Bagong Hamon	August 22, 2016	#SMPBagongHamon	13.6%	#1	#5	
26	Paghaharap	August 23, 2016	#SMPPaghaharap	12.9%	#1	#4	
27	Engkwentro	August 24, 2016	#SMPEngkwentro	13.9%	#1	#4	
28	Kalayaan	August 25, 2016	#SMPKalayaan	13.4%	#1	#5	
29	Muling Pagkikita	August 26, 2016	#SMPMulingPagkikita	14.7%	#1	#3	
30	Nasaan ka, Clara?	August 29, 2016	#SMPNasaanKaClara	14.1%	#2	#6	
31	Muling Naglalapit	August 30, 2016	#SMPMulingNaglalapit	—N/a			
32	Pag-amin ni Jason	August 31, 2016	#SMPPagAminNiJason	13.9%	#1	#4	

=== September 2016 ===
Episode		Original air date	Social Media Hashtag	AGB Nielsen Urban Luzon Households in Television Homes			Ref.
Episode		Original air date	Social Media Hashtag	Rating	Timeslot Rank	Afternoon Rank	Ref.
33	"Laban ni Clara" (Against Clara)	Thursday, September 1, 2016	#SMPLabanNiClara	12.0%	#2	#7	
34	"Kasunduan" (Agreement)	Friday, September 2, 2016	#SMPKasunduan	12.9%	#2	#8	
35	"Galit kay Roman" (Angry at Roman)	Monday, September 5, 2016	#SMPGalitKayRoman	13.1%	#1	#5	
36	"Harapang Raquel, at Ellen" (Front Raquel, and Ellen)	Tuesday, September 6, 2016	#SMPHarapangRaquelEllen	12.5%	#1	#4	
37	"Jason ay Aguirre" (Jason is Aguirre)	Wednesday, September 7, 2016	#SMPJasonAyAguirre	13.6%	#1	#5	
38	"Jason vs. Roman"	Thursday, September 8, 2016	#SMPJasonVsRoman	13.3%	#1	#6	
39	"The Good Son"	Friday, September 9, 2016	#SMPTheGoodSon	14.9%	#1	#4	
40	"Kasalanan" (Sin)	Monday, September 12, 2016	#SMPKasalanan	12.1%	#1	#7	
41	"Saving Clara"	Tuesday, September 13, 2016	#SMPSavingClara	13.4%	#1	#4	
42	"Where is Ellen?"	Wednesday, September 14, 2016	#SMPWhereIsEllen	14.5%	#1	#5	
43	"Frame Up"	Thursday, September 15, 2016	#SMPFrameUp	11.8%	#2	#8	
44	"Clearing Jason"	Friday, September 16, 2016	#SMPClearingJason	13.5%	#1	#5	
						Daytime Rank	
45	"Planong Pagtakas" (Escape Plan)	Monday, September 19, 2016	#SMPPlanongPagtakas	12.3%	#1	#6	
46	"Pagbubuniyag" (Baptism)	Tuesday, September 20, 2016	#SMPPagbubuniyag	11.3%	#1	#8	
47	"Pagtatalo" (Dispute)	Wednesday, September 21, 2016	#SMPPagtatalo	10.4%	#2	#9	
48	"Sino ang Ama?" (Who is the Father?)	Thursday, September 22, 2016	#SMPSinoAngAma	12.4%	#1	#6	
49	"Pagluluksa" (Mourning)	Friday, September 23, 2016	#SMPPagluluksa	11.7%	#1	#8	
50	"Walang Kasingsakit" (No Pain)	Monday, September 26, 2016	#SMPWalangKasingSakit	13.0%	#1	#4	
51	"Paalam, Noah" (Goodbye, Noah)	Tuesday, September 27, 2016	#SMPPaalamNoah	13.7%	#1	#4	
52	"Bagong Yugto" (New Stage)	Wednesday, September 28, 2016	#SMPBagongYugto	14.6%	#1	#6	
53	"Laban Kung Laban" (Against If Against)	Thursday, September 29, 2016	#SMPLabanKungLaban	13.1%	#1	#6	
54	"Bagong Kapalaran" (New Fate)	Friday, September 30, 2016	#SMPBagongKapalaran	14.2%	#1	#3	

=== October 2016 ===
Episode		Original air date	Social Media Hashtag	AGB Nielsen Urban Luzon Households in Television Homes			Ref.
Episode		Original air date	Social Media Hashtag	Rating	Timeslot Rank	Daytime Rank	Ref.
55	"Salisihan" (Disagreement)	Monday, October 3, 2016	#SMPSalisihan	12.7%	#1	#4	
56	"Walang Atrasan" (No turning back)	Tuesday, October 4, 2016	#SMPWalangAtrasan	13.4%	#1	#5	
57	"Sa Pananakot ni Roman" (In Roman Intimidation)	Wednesday, October 5, 2016	#SMPSaPananakotNiRoman	13.0%	#1	#5	
58	"Guilty"	Thursday, October 6, 2016	#SMPGuilty	13.2%	#1	#5	
59	"Tuloy ang Laban" (The Battle continues)	Friday, October 7, 2016	#SMPTuloyAngLaban	13.6%	#1	#6	
60	"Ganti ng Api" (Revenge of Oppression)	Monday, October 10, 2016	#SMPGantiNgApi	11.2%	#1	#4	
61	"Matinding Pag-amin" (Strong Confession)	Tuesday, October 11, 2016	#SMPMatindingPagAmin	12.9%	#1	#5	
62	"Kaguluhan" (Chaos)	Wednesday, October 12, 2016	#SMPKaguluhan	13.5%	#1	#5	
63	"Confirmed"	Thursday, October 13, 2016	#SMPConfirmed	13.5%	#1	#5	
						Afternoon Rank	
64	"Matibay na Ebidensya" (Strong Evidence)	Friday, October 14, 2016	#SMPMatibayNaEbidensya	13.0%	#1	#5	
65	"Masamang Balak" (Bad intention)	Monday, October 17, 2016	#SMPMasamangBalak	14.0%	#1	#6	
66	"Arestado" (Arrested)	Tuesday, October 18, 2016	#SMPArestado	12.8%	#1	#6	
67	"Hustisya" (Justice)	Wednesday, October 19, 2016	#SMPHustisya	13.8%	#1	#5	
68	"Huling Alas" (Last Alas)	Thursday, October 20, 2016	#SMPHulingAlas	16.2%	#1	#4	
69	"Clara Fights Back"	Friday, October 21, 2016	#SMPClaraFightsBack	14.2%	#1	#4	
70	"Panganib sa Buhay" (Risk to Life)	Monday, October 24, 2016	#SMPPanganibSaBuhay	13.6%	#1	#4	
71	"Bagong Kakampi" (New Ally)	Tuesday, October 25, 2016	#SMPBagongKakampi	14.3%	#1	#3	
72	"Buwis-buhay" (Tax-life)	Wednesday, October 26, 2016	#SMPBuwisBuhay	14.6%	#1	#3	
73	"Jason's Hell"	Thursday, October 27, 2016	#SMPJasonsHell	14.3%	#1	#3	
74	"Ang Pagwawakas" (The Termination)	Friday, October 28, 2016	#SMPAngPagwawakas	15.5%	#1	#3	

Episodes notes
