= List of Bagong Umaga episodes =

Bagong Umaga (International title: New Beginnings / transl. New Morning) is a Philippine television drama romance series broadcast by Kapamilya Channel. The series premiered on the network's Kapamilya Gold afternoon block and worldwide via The Filipino Channel from October 26, 2020 to April 30, 2021, replacing Love Thy Woman.

== Series overview ==
Season	Episodes	Originally released	
Season	Episodes	First released	Last released
1	129	October 26, 2020	April 30, 2021

- iWantTFC shows two episodes first in advance before it broadcasts on TV.

== Episodes ==
=== Season 1 ===
No. overall	No. in season	Title	Original release date	AGB Nielsen Ratings (NUTAM People)
1	1	"Simula ng Bagong Umaga"	October 26, 2020	N/A
2	2	"Hindi Patas"	October 27, 2020	N/A
3	3	"Delihensiya"	October 28, 2020	N/A
4	4	"Integrity"	October 29, 2020	N/A
5	5	"Pressure"	October 30, 2020	N/A
6	6	"Demolish"	November 2, 2020	N/A
7	7	"Imbestiga"	November 3, 2020	N/A
8	8	"Wallet"	November 4, 2020	N/A
9	9	"Birthday"	November 5, 2020	N/A
10	10	"Reporter"	November 6, 2020	N/A
11	11	"Assault"	November 9, 2020	N/A
12	12	"Tapilok"	November 10, 2020	N/A
13	13	"Spy"	November 11, 2020	N/A
14	14	"Accidental Kiss"	November 12, 2020	N/A
15	15	"Sugod"	November 13, 2020	N/A
16	16	"Divided By"	November 16, 2020	N/A
17	17	"May Something"	November 17, 2020	N/A
18	18	"Getting Closer"	November 18, 2020	N/A
19	19	"Tambayan"	November 19, 2020	N/A
20	20	"Celebration"	November 20, 2020	N/A
21	21	"Almost Kiss"	November 23, 2020	N/A
22	22	"Fishing"	November 24, 2020	N/A
23	23	"Photo Album"	November 25, 2020	N/A
24	24	"First Kiss"	November 26, 2020	1.8%
25	25	"Umasa"	November 27, 2020	N/A
26	26	"Tuliro"	November 30, 2020	N/A
27	27	"Real Talk"	December 1, 2020	N/A
28	28	"Blaming Game"	December 2, 2020	N/A
29	29	"Fake Date"	December 3, 2020	N/A
30	30	"Triple Date"	December 4, 2020	N/A
31	31	"Trust Issues"	December 7, 2020	N/A
32	32	"Hearing"	December 8, 2020	N/A
33	33	"Comfort"	December 9, 2020	N/A
34	34	"Second Chance"	December 10, 2020	N/A
35	35	"Imbitasyon"	December 11, 2020	1.7%
36	36	"Reconcile"	December 14, 2020	N/A
37	37	"Trending"	December 15, 2020	N/A
38	38	"Damage Control"	December 16, 2020	N/A
39	39	"Defend"	December 17, 2020	N/A
40	40	"Investigate"	December 18, 2020	N/A
41	41	"Take 2"	December 21, 2020	N/A
42	42	"Tension"	December 22, 2020	N/A
43	43	"Depression"	December 23, 2020	N/A
44	44	"Realizations"	December 24, 2020	N/A
45	45	"Reunite"	December 25, 2020	1.8%
46	46	"Mistake"	December 28, 2020	N/A
47	47	"Guilt"	December 29, 2020	N/A
48	48	"Bintang"	December 30, 2020	N/A
49	49	"Worried"	December 31, 2020	N/A
50	50	"Arrest"	January 1, 2021	N/A
51	51	"Frame Up"	January 4, 2021	1.8%
52	52	"Evidence"	January 5, 2021	N/A
53	53	"Tattoo"	January 6, 2021	N/A
54	54	"Prinsipyo"	January 7, 2021	N/A
55	55	"Confession"	January 8, 2021	N/A
56	56	"Paternity Test"	January 11, 2021	N/A
57	57	"Salisi"	January 12, 2021	N/A
58	58	"Burner Phone"	January 13, 2021	N/A
59	59	"Entrapment"	January 14, 2021	N/A
60	60	"Kasunduan"	January 15, 2021	N/A
61	61	"Conflict of Interest"	January 18, 2021	N/A
62	62	"Sisante"	January 19, 2021	N/A
63	63	"Rebelasyon"	January 20, 2021	N/A
64	64	"Blood Type"	January 21, 2021	N/A
65	65	"Biological Daughter"	January 22, 2021	N/A
66	66	"Daughter's Plea"	January 25, 2021	2.2%
67	67	"Katotohanan"	January 26, 2021	N/A
68	68	"Two Daughters"	January 27, 2021	N/A
69	69	"Where is Cai?"	January 28, 2021	N/A
70	70	"Comparison"	January 29, 2021	N/A
71	71	"Kidney Donor"	February 1, 2021	N/A
72	72	"Exposè"	February 2, 2021	N/A
73	73	"Switched"	February 3, 2021	N/A
74	74	"Tampuhan"	February 4, 2021	N/A
75	75	"Denial"	February 5, 2021	N/A
76	76	"Hangarin"	February 8, 2021	N/A
77	77	"Konsensya"	February 9, 2021	N/A
78	78	"Lantad"	February 10, 2021	N/A
79	79	"Becoming Better"	February 11, 2021	N/A
80	80	"DNA Test"	February 12, 2021	N/A
81	81	"Biological Son"	February 15, 2021	2.2%
82	82	"Selosan"	February 16, 2021	N/A
83	83	"Sisihan"	February 17, 2021	N/A
84	84	"Cancel Veradona"	February 18, 2021	N/A
85	85	"Sabwatan"	February 19, 2021	N/A
86	86	"Secret Donor"	February 22, 2021	N/A
87	87	"Pangungulila"	February 23, 2021	N/A
88	88	"Paninirang Puri"	February 24, 2021	N/A
89	89	"Sangkot"	February 25, 2021	N/A
90	90	"Sampalan"	February 26, 2021	N/A
91	91	"Sacrifice"	March 1, 2021	N/A
92	92	"Pakiusap"	March 2, 2021	N/A
93	93	"Paubaya"	March 3, 2021	N/A
94	94	"Change of Heart"	March 4, 2021	N/A
95	95	"Lipat Bahay"	March 5, 2021	N/A
96	96	"Testify"	March 8, 2021	N/A
97	97	"Kuntinsi"	March 9, 2021	N/A
98	98	"Paninira"	March 10, 2021	N/A
99	99	"Hatol"	March 11, 2021	N/A
100	100	"The Plan"	March 12, 2021	N/A
101	101	"Sumbatan"	March 15, 2021	1.8%
102	102	"Hit and Run"	March 16, 2021	1.9%
103	103	"Accomplice"	March 17, 2021	N/A
104	104	"Konsensya"	March 18, 2021	N/A
105	105	"Inspection"	March 19, 2021	N/A
106	106	"Kahilingan"	March 22, 2021	N/A
107	107	"New Home"	March 23, 2021	N/A
108	108	"Adjustment"	March 24, 2021	N/A
109	109	"Sakripisyo"	March 25, 2021	N/A
110	110	"Harassment"	March 26, 2021	N/A
111	111	"Kompronta"	April 6, 2021	N/A
112	112	"Quest for Truth"	April 7, 2021	N/A
113	113	"Pagbabago"	April 8, 2021	N/A
114	114	"Kumpirmado"	April 9, 2021	N/A
115	115	"Pagtatago"	April 12, 2021	N/A
116	116	"Huling Habilin"	April 13, 2021	N/A
117	117	"Paalam, Cai"	April 14, 2021	N/A
118	118	"Foul Play"	April 15, 2021	N/A
119	119	"Paghihiganti"	April 16, 2021	N/A
120	120	"Pagluluksa"	April 19, 2021	N/A
121	121	"Sumbat"	April 20, 2021	N/A
122	122	"Banta"	April 21, 2021	N/A
123	123	"Kumbinsi"	April 22, 2021	N/A
124	124	"Confirmed"	April 23, 2021	N/A
125	125	"Takas"	April 26, 2021	N/A
126	126	"Kasabwat"	April 27, 2021	N/A
127	127	"Ebidensya"	April 28, 2021	N/A
128	128	"Betrayed"	April 29, 2021	N/A
129	129	"Tagos sa Pusong Pagtatapos"	April 30, 2021	N/A

- This series aired nationally on a cable channel/pay TV which has a relatively smaller audience compared to other media broadcasters.
