= San Jose Matulid Chapel =

Roman Catholic church in Pampanga, Philippines

- Capilla de San Jose Matulid (Spanish)
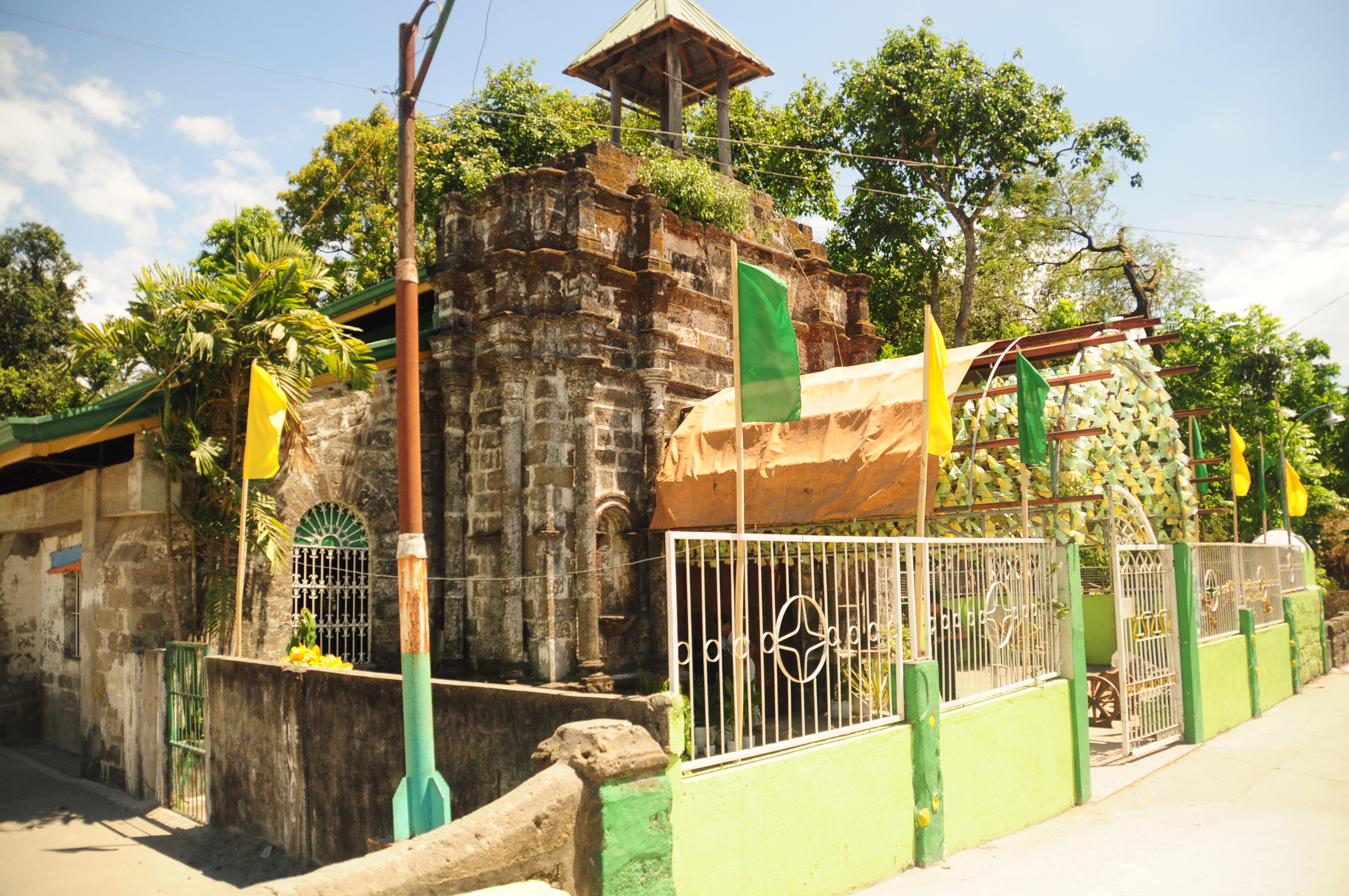
- Church facade in 2015

- Location in Luzon Location in the Philippines
- 15°02′36″N 120°43′03″E
- Location: San Jose Matulid, Mexico, Pampanga
- Country: Philippines
- Denomination: Roman Catholic

Architecture
- Functional status: Active
- Architectural type: Chapel
- Style: Baroque

Specifications
- Materials: Sand, gravel, cement, mortar, steel

Administration
- Province: Ecclesiastical Province of San Fernando
- Archdiocese: Roman Catholic Archdiocese of San Fernando

San Jose Matulid Chapel is an undated Roman Catholic chapel found at Barangay San Jose Matulid, Mexico, Pampanga, Philippines. It is under the jurisdiction of the Archdiocese of San Fernando, and is believed to be the first church of the town before the Augustinian Friars transferred to the present-day townsite of Mexico, Pampanga or now known as Barangay Parian.

== History ==
The San Jose Matulid chapel, located southwest of the town center at Barangay San Jose Matulid, is believed to be the oldest chapel of its kind in Pampanga province. Its site is also believed to be the first settlement established by the missionary friars upon their arrival into the area before transferring to its present site at Barangay Parian due to the constant flooding of the a nearby creek called Sapang Matulid. No available records tell of the exact date of construction of the chapel.

== Architecture ==
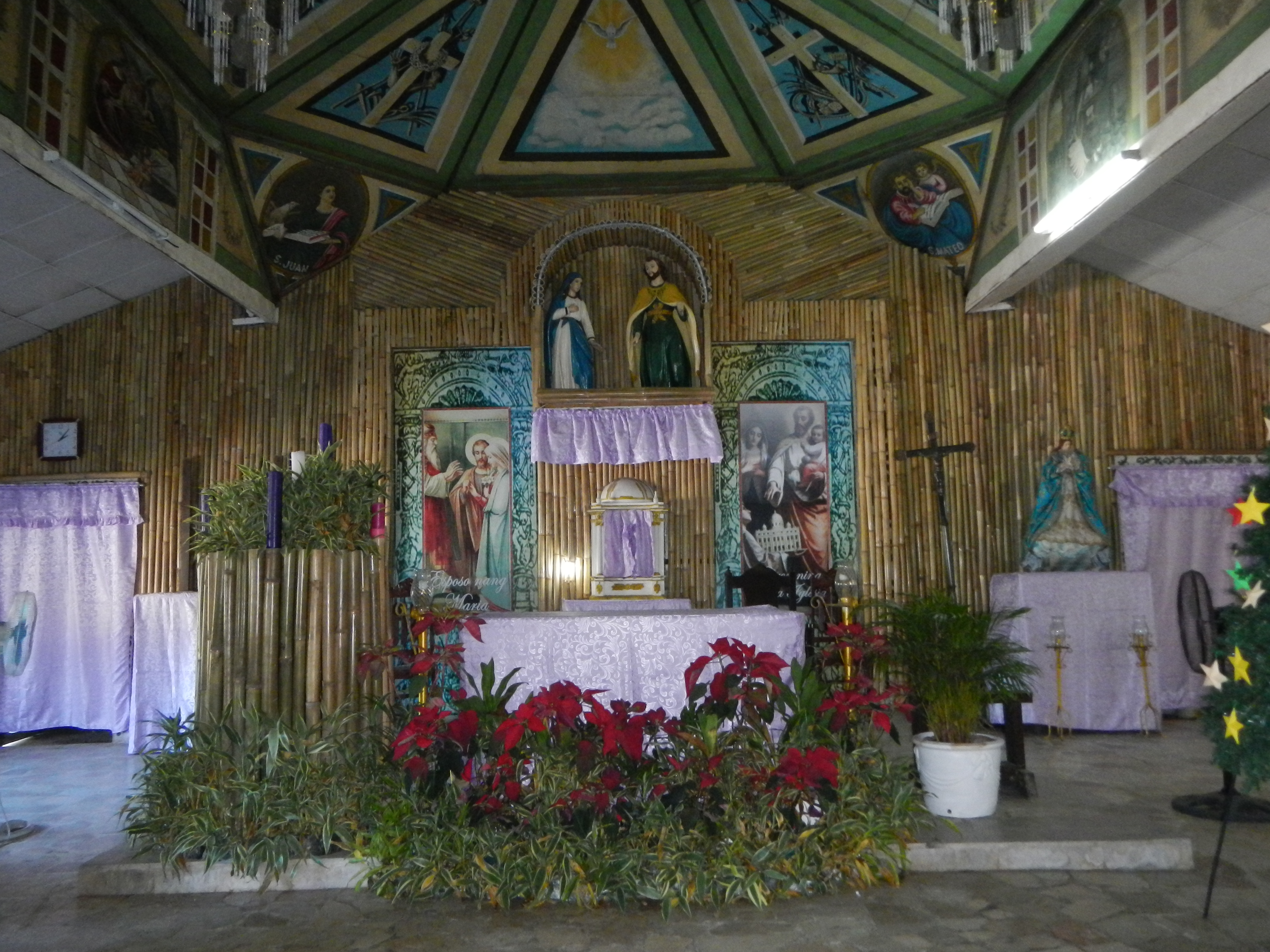
Church altar in 2015

The chapel's façade is adorned by couples of Tuscan pillars reaching into its apex. The central portion then expands horizontally with two unadorned walls with semicircular arch windows. The façade is topped by a wood and galvanized iron belfry. One of its two bells was reportedly stolen. Notable features of the chapel's interior are the ceiling art located above the main altar.

== See also ==
- Pio Chapel
