= Mexico, Pampanga =

Municipality in Pampanga, Philippines

Mexico Masiku
- Municipality
- Municipality of Mexico
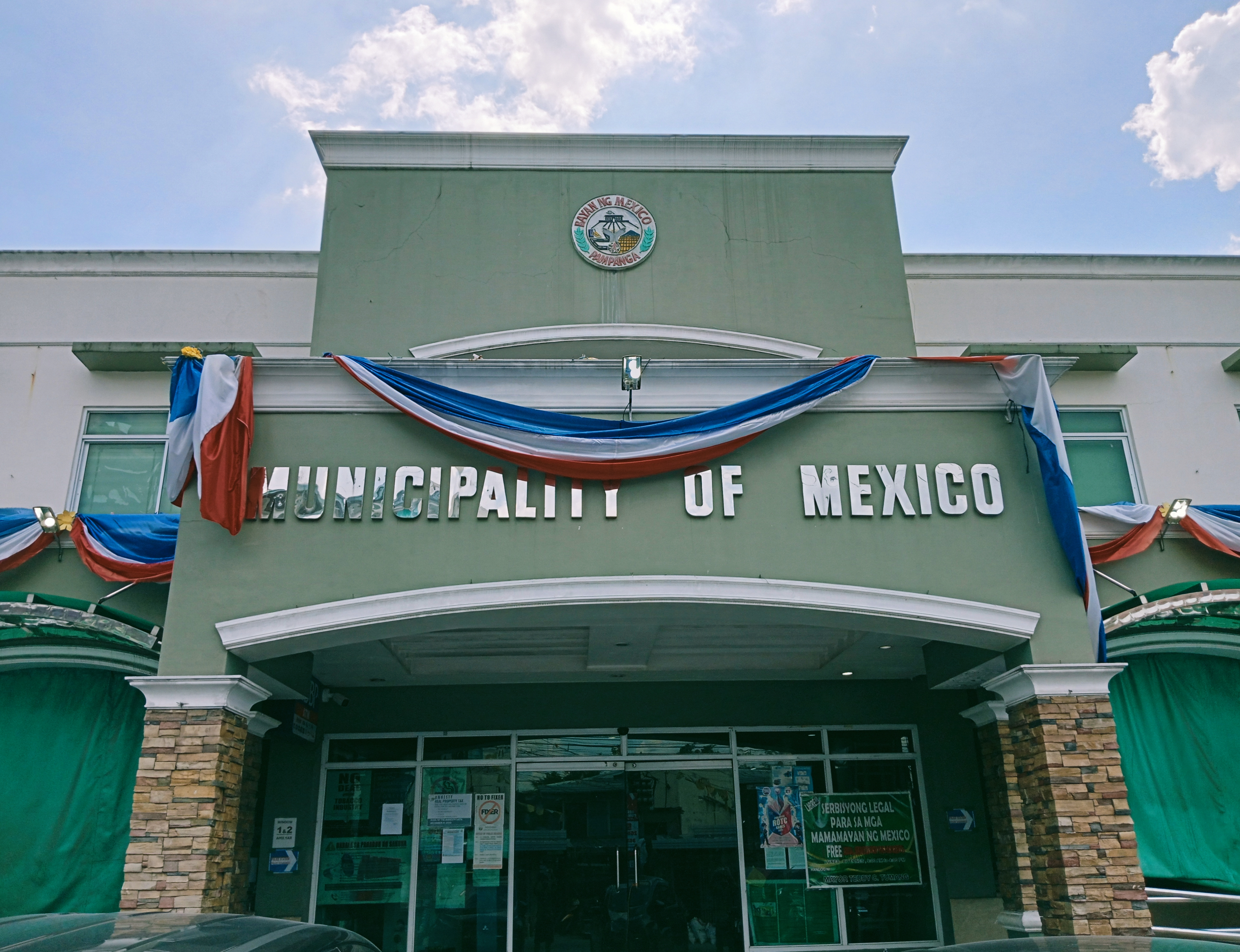
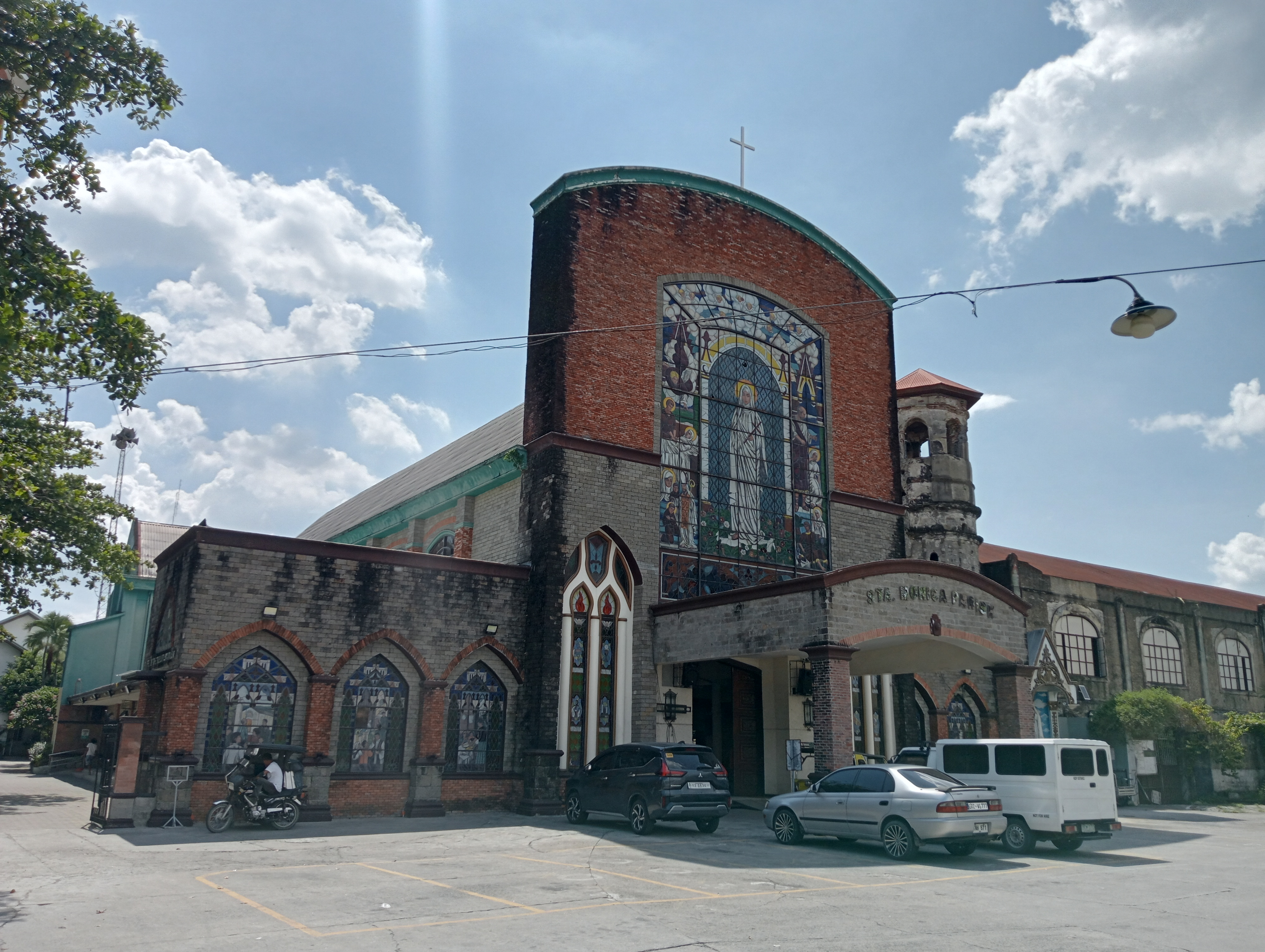
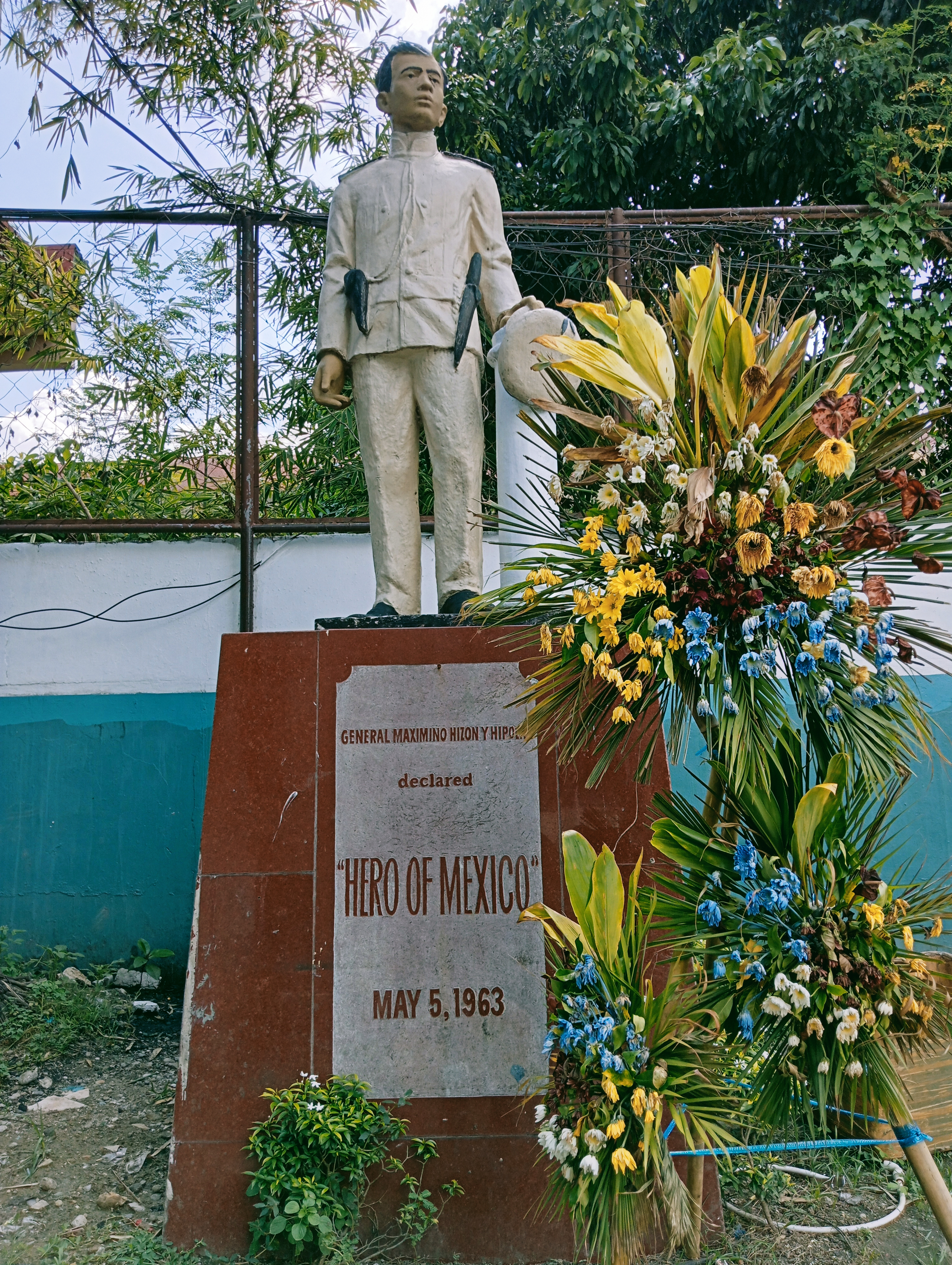
- Mexico Municipal Hall Santa Monica Parish Church General Hizon (Hero of Mexico) Monument

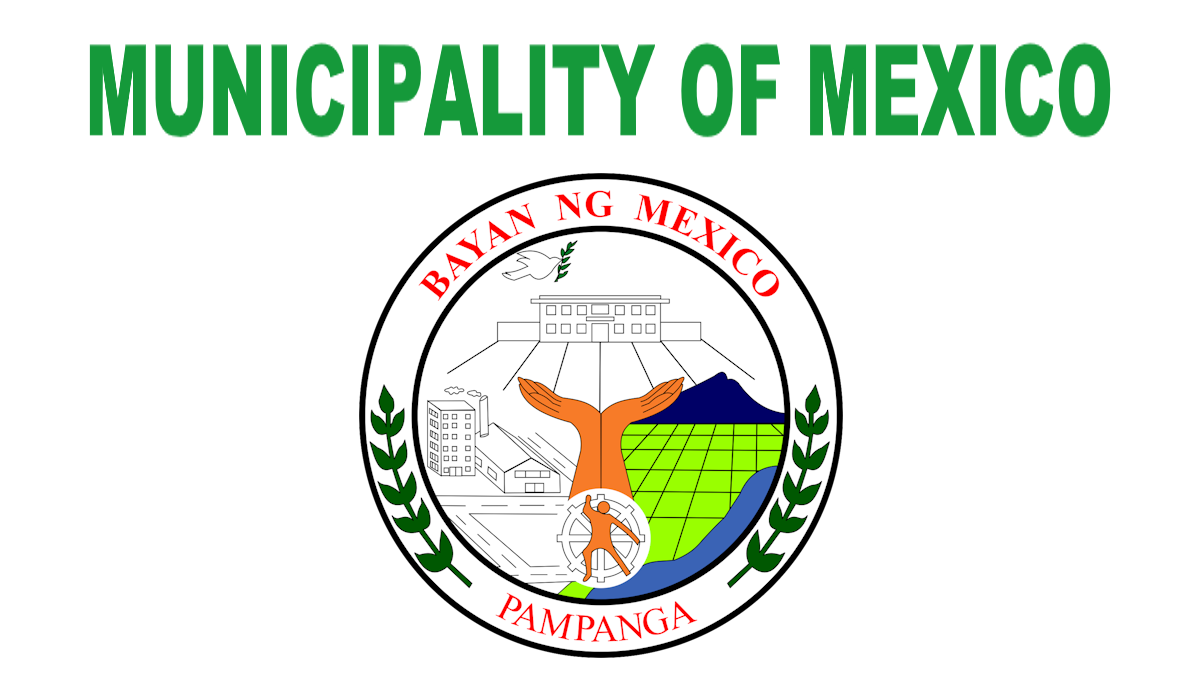
- Flag Seal

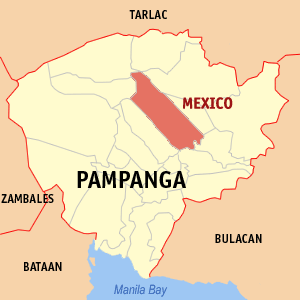
- Map of Pampanga with Mexico highlighted
- Interactive map of Mexico
- Location within the Philippines
- Coordinates: 15°03′52″N 120°43′13″E
- Country: Philippines
- Region: Central Luzon
- Province: Pampanga
- District: 3rd district
- Founded: April 24, 1581
- Named for: Mexico City
- Barangays: 43 (see Barangays)

Government
  - Type: Sangguniang Bayan
  - Mayor: Rodencio S. Gonzales
  - Vice Mayor: Jonathan R. Pangan
  - Representative: Alyssa Michaela M. Gonzales
  - Municipal Council: Members: Allaine C. Ramos; Ma. Angela B. Pangan; Tristar P. Sotto; Lourdes G. Sicat; Vince M. Balajadia; Ariel Bonus; Jaypee Gozun; Trina D. Guevarra
  - Electorate: 100,362 voters (2025)

Area
  - Total: 117.41 km^{2} (45.33 sq mi)
- Elevation: 10 m (33 ft)
- Highest elevation: 34 m (112 ft)
- Lowest elevation: 2 m (6.6 ft)

Population (2024 census)
  - Total: 187,597
  - Density: 1,597.8/km^{2} (4,138.3/sq mi)
  - Households: 40,498

Economy
  - Income class: 1st municipal income class
  - Poverty incidence: 8.1% (2023)
  - Revenue: ₱ 856.2 million (2024)
  - Assets: ₱ 1,938 million (2024)
  - Expenditure: ₱ 639.7 million (2024)
  - Liabilities: ₱ 390.1 million (2024)

Service provider
  - Electricity: Pampanga 1 Electric Cooperative, Inc. (PELCO 1) & Pampanga Rural Electric Service Cooperative (PRESCO)
- Time zone: UTC+8 (PST)
- ZIP code: 2021
- PSGC: 0305413000
- IDD : area code: +63 (0)45
- Native languages: Kapampangan, Tagalog
- Website: www.mexicopampanga.gov.ph

Mexico (also known as Masiku), officially the Municipality of Mexico (Kapampangan: Balen ning Mexico; Tagalog: Bayan ng Mexico), is a municipality in the province of Pampanga, the Philippines. According to the 2024 census, it has a population of 187,597 people.

It was also formerly known as Nuevo México during the Spanish period.

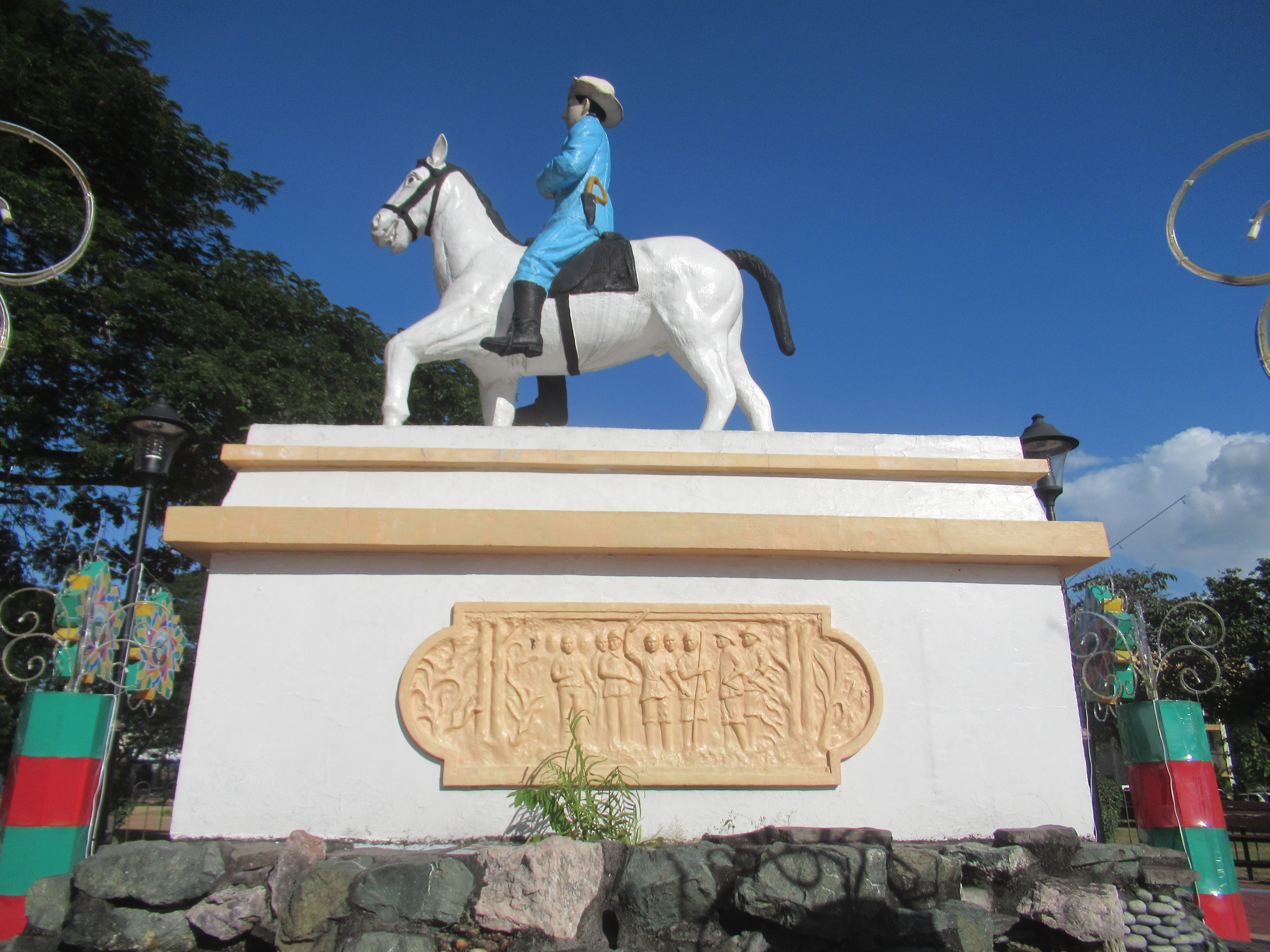
Maximino Hipolito Hizon "Bayani ng Mexico"

== Etymology ==
According to folk etymology, the original pre-Hispanic name of the village was purportedly Masicu or Maca-sicu, which the Spaniards spelled as "México". It is claimed that this was a reference to an abundance of chico trees. However chico trees are not endemic to the Philippines and were introduced by the Spaniards from what is now the country of Mexico. Another claim is that it is derived from siku ("elbow") and was a reference to the elbow-shaped bends of the nearby Abacan and Pampanga Rivers. But there are no records of the town ever being called Masicu. Instead, the origin of the latter name is believed to be simply a common mispronunciation by the locals.

== History ==
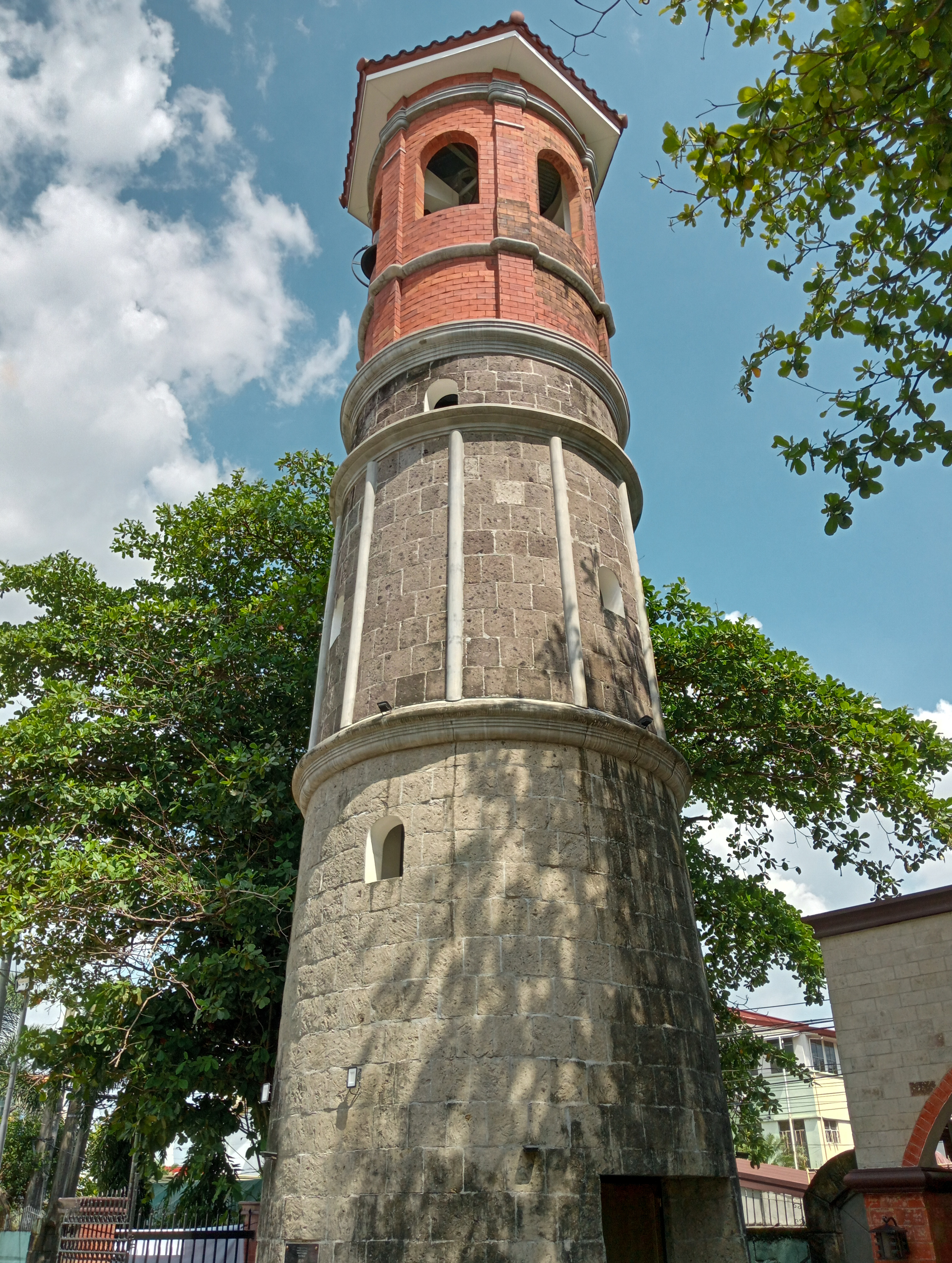
Santa Mónica Belfry Tower

According to the Augustinian records in Libros de Gobierno Eclesiástico, the town was founded as a river trading port at around 1581 and was originally named Novo México (the Old Spanish form of Nuevo México, "New Mexico") after Mexico City. Mexico, Pampanga, definitely received immigrants from Mexico since it is recorded that there were thousands of Mexican migrants to the Philippines, per year, back when the Philippines was part of Mexico-City governed Viceroyalty of New Spain. In Rafael Bernal's book México en Filipinas, it is explicitly stated that Pampanga was home to large concentrations of Mexican immigrants.

The Spanish colonists made México the capital of the newly formed Province of Pampanga. Gaspar de San Agustín wrote that being the capital, México was one of the most “beautiful and charming” centers in the province. A lavish church made of stone and tiles, the Parish of Santa Mónica, was built in 1581 with Masangsang and Matúlid serving as its visitas. Mexico also formerly included the city of San Fernando, including parts of Angeles City (formerly its barrio San Ángelo).

In 1660, Don Francisco Maniago, a native leader from México, led the Pampanga Revolt against the Spanish government. It was caused by the imposition of forced labor (polo) and rice tributes (bandala) by the Spanish colonial government. Maniago also inspired similar revolts in neighboring cities. These were suppressed in 1661 by Governor-General Sabiniano Manrique de Lara. It was during the Revolt that ancestral houses of Pampanga were built. In Mexico, the biggest Spanish-era colonial architecture composite construction is the Lazatin-Henson-Katigbak Mansion along 2nd street, Barangay Parián (Poblacion).

Spanish colonial authorities stripped México of its political importance after the Pampanga Revolt by moving the provincial capital further downstream to Bacolor. But it retained its strategic economic importance especially among the Lúsung Chinese and their mestizo descendants. México was still a regular drop off point of forest products from the upper reaches of the Ábacan River. It was also a favored destination by merchants from as far north as Pangasinan.

By the 18th century, the Chinese traders and their mestizo de sangley descendants living in México, Guagua and Malabon had formed and maintained business and social alliances with each other. Cascos and sampans maintained the flow of goods along the Malabon-Guagua-México chain. Like the Chinese section of Manila, the commercial center of México became known as the Parián.

In 1898, General Maximino Hizon rallied Kapampángans to fight the Spanish colonial troops under Emilio Aguinaldo's revolutionary banner and ordered the execution of the parish priests of México and San Fernando. When the United States of America replaced Spain as the new coloniser in 1898, Hizon soon rose up to become supreme commander of all Philippine forces in Pampanga. He was captured by the Americans in 1901 and exiled to Guam after refusing to pledge allegiance to the United States. He died in exile on September 1, 1901.

== Geography ==
Mexico is 8 kilometers (5.0 mi) from San Fernando and 74 kilometers (46 mi) from Manila.

=== Barangays ===
Mexico is politically subdivided into 43 barangays. Each barangay consists of puroks and some have sitios.

- Acli
- Anao
- Balas
- Buenavista
- Camuning
- Cawayan
- Concepcion
- Culubasa
- Divisoria
- Dolores (Piring)
- Eden
- Gandus
- Lagundi
- Laput
- Laug
- Masamat
- Masangsang (Santo Cristo)
- Nueva Victoria
- Pandacaqui
- Pangatlan
- Panipuan
- Parian (Poblacion)
- Sabanilla
- San Antonio
- San Carlos
- San Jose Malino
- San Jose Matulid
- San Juan
- San Lorenzo
- San Miguel
- San Nicolas
- San Pablo
- San Patricio
- San Rafael
- San Roque
- San Vicente
- Santa Cruz
- Santa Maria
- Santo Domingo
- Santo Rosario
- Sapang Maisac
- Suclaban
- Tangle

=== Climate ===
Climate data for Mexico, Pampanga
Month	Jan	Feb	Mar	Apr	May	Jun	Jul	Aug	Sep	Oct	Nov	Dec	Year
Mean daily maximum °C (°F)	28 (82)	29 (84)	31 (88)	33 (91)	32 (90)	31 (88)	30 (86)	29 (84)	29 (84)	30 (86)	30 (86)	28 (82)	30 (86)
Mean daily minimum °C (°F)	20 (68)	20 (68)	21 (70)	23 (73)	24 (75)	24 (75)	24 (75)	24 (75)	24 (75)	23 (73)	22 (72)	21 (70)	23 (72)
Average precipitation mm (inches)	6 (0.2)	4 (0.2)	6 (0.2)	17 (0.7)	82 (3.2)	122 (4.8)	151 (5.9)	123 (4.8)	124 (4.9)	99 (3.9)	37 (1.5)	21 (0.8)	792 (31.1)
Average rainy days	3.3	2.5	3.6	6.6	17.7	22.2	25.2	23.7	23.2	17.9	9.2	5.2	160.3
Source: Meteoblue

== Demographics ==
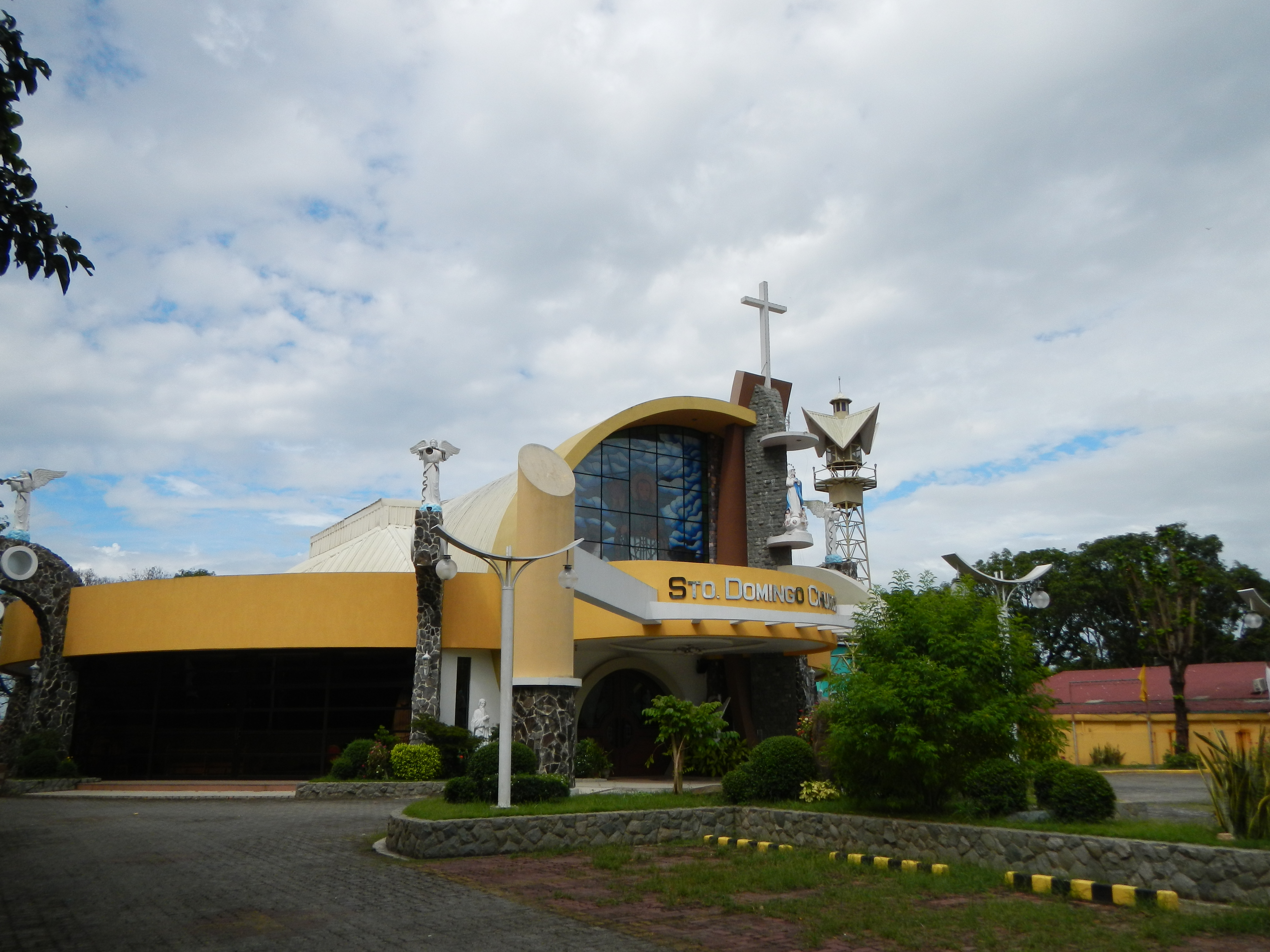
Santo Domingo de Guzman Parish

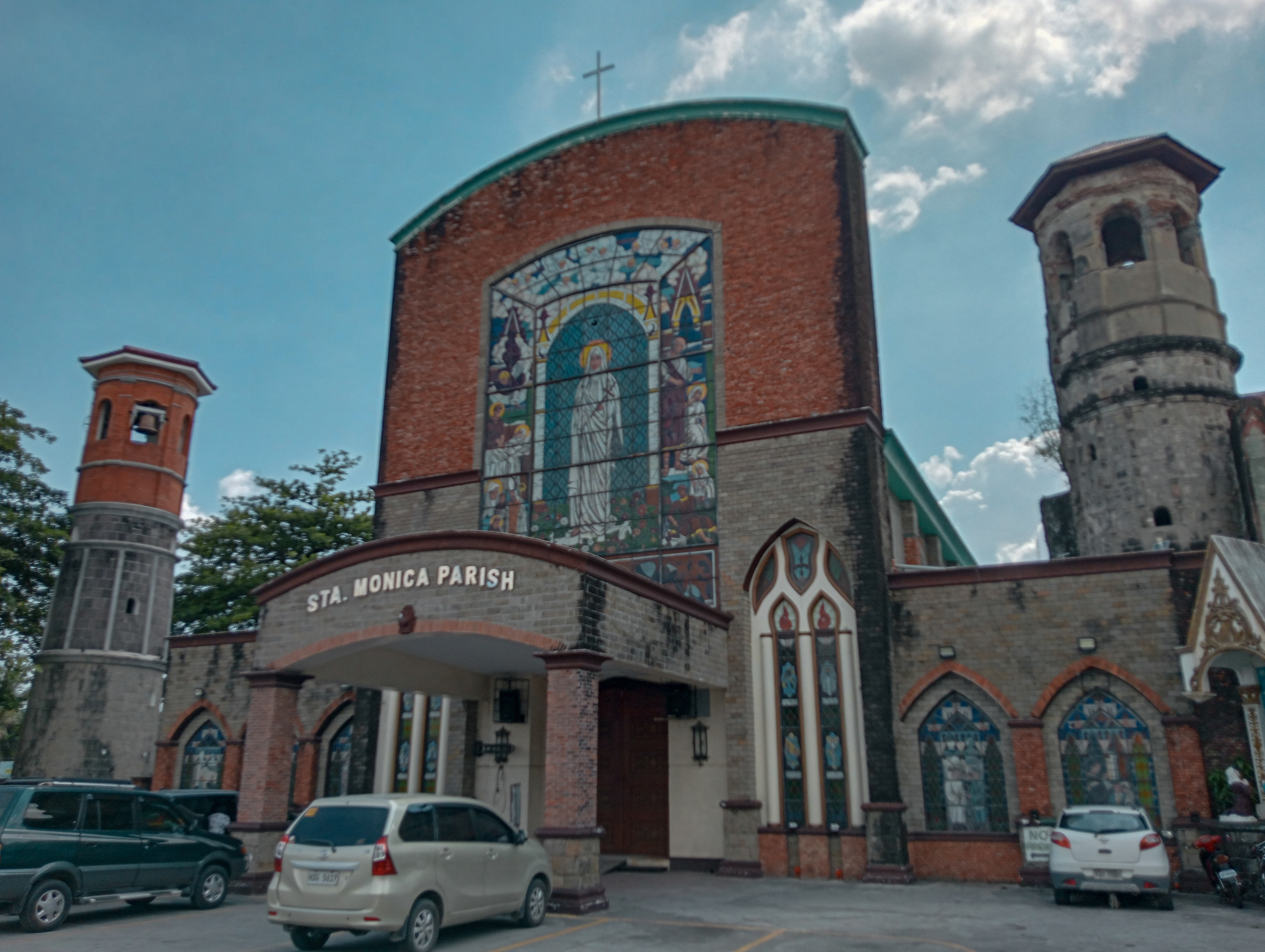
Santa Monica Parish Church

Population census of Mexico

Year	Pop.	±% p.a.
1903	13,469	—
1918	16,151	+1.22%
1939	22,341	+1.56%
1948	18,678	−1.97%
1960	29,449	+3.87%
1970	41,145	+3.40%
1975	48,805	+3.48%
1980	53,491	+1.85%

Year	Pop.	±% p.a.
1990	69,546	+2.66%
1995	91,696	+5.32%
2000	109,481	+3.87%
2007	141,298	+3.58%
2010	146,851	+1.41%
2015	154,624	+0.99%
2020	173,403	+2.44%
2024	187,597	+1.91%

Source: Philippine Statistics Authority

In the 2024 census, the population of Mexico was 187,597 people, with a density of 1,600 inhabitants per square kilometer or 4,100 inhabitants per square mile.

=== Religion ===
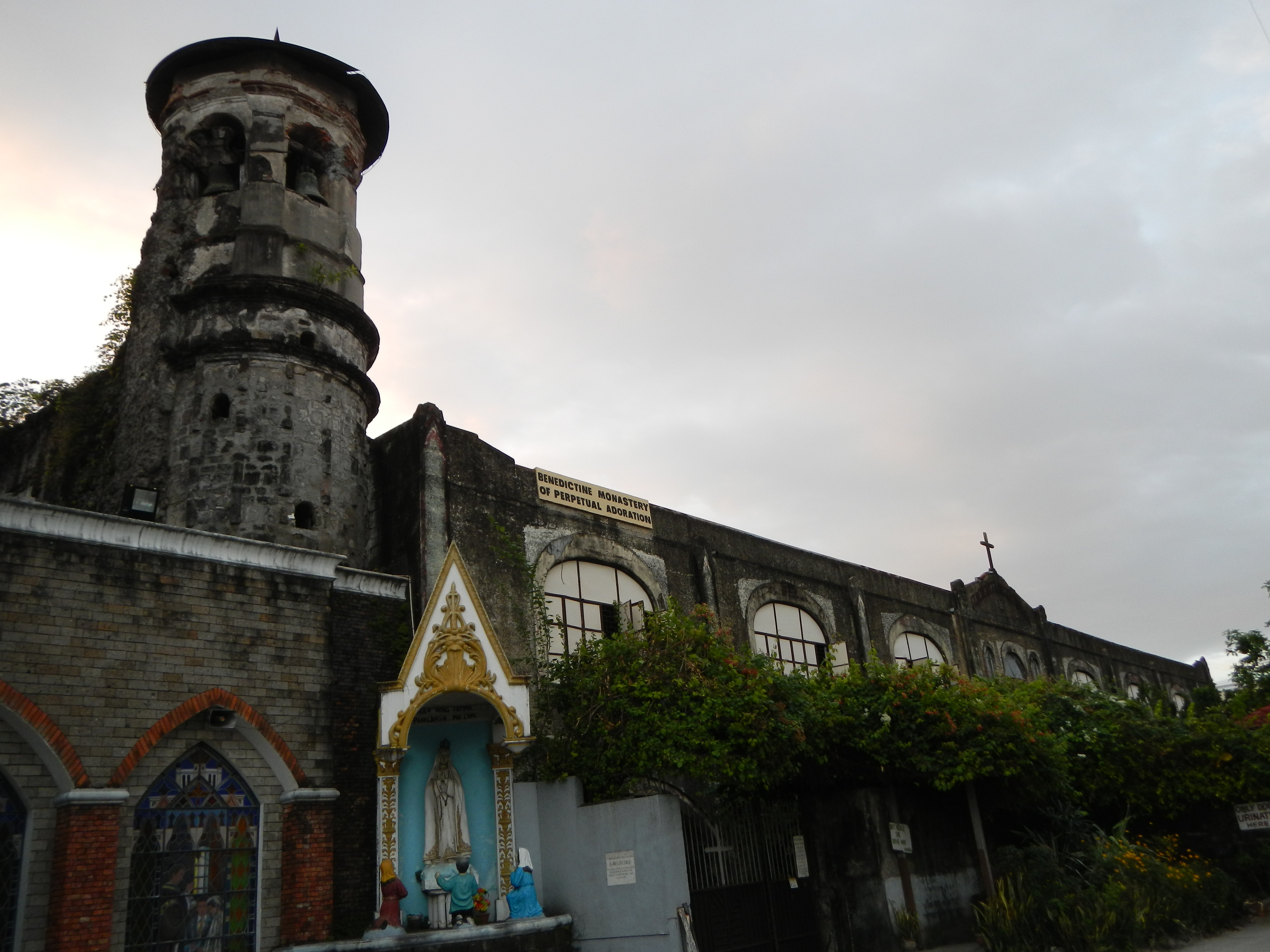
Benedictine Monastery of Perpetual Adoration

Roman Catholic parish churches and Spanish-era chapels:

- Santa Monica Parish Church and Belfry was built by Fr. Jose dela Cruz in 1665 but was destroyed during an earthquake in 1880. What remains is just the Belfry Tower of the former Augustinian-run church. Near the 17th century Belltower of Mexico, one can also find the St. Benedict's Institution de Mexico, an Augustinian convent that was constructed in time with the Santa Monica Parish Church in 1665. Although Augustinian records such as the Estado of 1612 indicates that Mexico has one convent and two priests during that time.
- Good Shepherd Parish Church, Pandacaqui Ressetlement
- Our Lord's Annunciation Parish Church, San Vicente
- San Jose Parish Church, San Jose Malino
- San Miguel de Archangel Parish Church, Anao
- Santo Domingo de Guzman Parish Church
- San Isidro Labrador Chapel, Tangle (and in Sitio Suarez)
- San Jose Matulid Chapel is believed to be the oldest chapel in Pampanga.
- Sabanilla chapel. The Our Lady of the Most Holy Rosary chapel, commonly referred to as the Sabanilla chapel (bisitas ning Sabanilla), is a stone chapel located between the fork roads of the barangay leading to rice fields. Like the San Jose Matulid chapel, no available documents tell of the exact date and history of the chapel. Notable features of the structure are the saint's niche flanked by decorative columns and carved stone blinds located on rectangular windows of the façade.

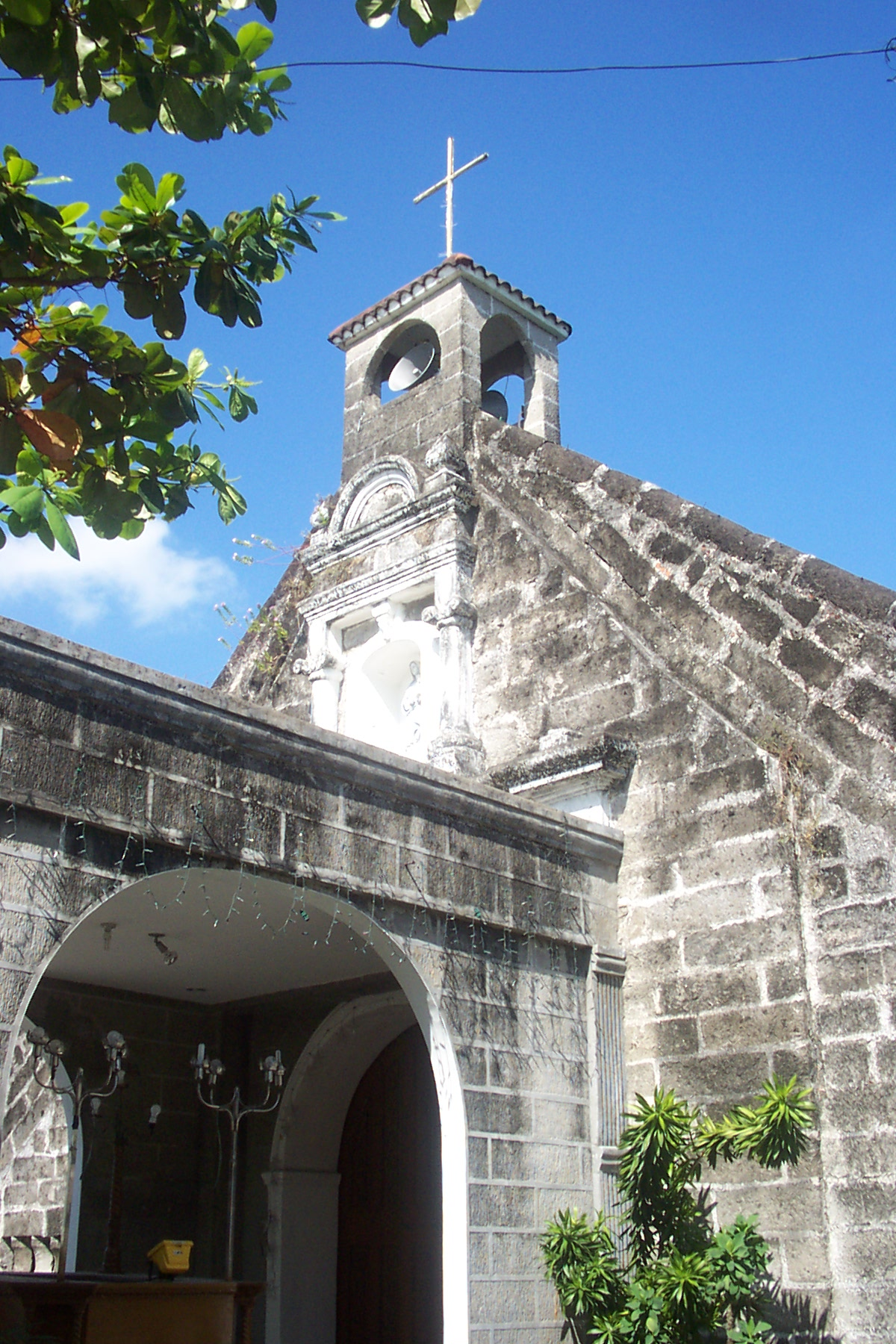
Facade of the Sabanilla chapel

==== Religious and cultural traditions ====
- Good Friday rites: The faithful remember the passion and death of Jesus by the pondering the Seven Last Words of Christ and the "Tanggal" (a re-enactment of how Jesus’ body was taken down from the cross). After the "Prusisyung Pasu at Pamangutcut" (Procession of the Scenes and Burial of Christ), the traditional "burul" (literally means: wake) where the Santo Entierro seems to be in a wake follows. In here, people visit and pray before the image, after which, in the midnight of Good Friday, there is a procession of the Virgen dela Soledad (Our Lady of Solitude). This is a ‘silent procession’ meditating and joining with the Virgin's sorrow and grief. Usually, single men and women join the procession believing that they will be blessed in their opted state of ‘single blessedness' in life.
- Easter Sunday celebration: The faithful celebrate Easter. During the day, the Filipino tradition of "Salubong/Encuentro" is done, after which the "Pacbung Judas" or the burning of Judas' effigy follows.
- April 24: This is regarded as the Mexico Day, following the date of the establishment of the town and parish on April 24, 1581. This coincides with the Feast of the Conversion of Saint Augustine. During the day, the parish organizes the Augustinian Festival as a tribute to the Augustinian forefathers of the town. A procession of different Augustinian saints and blesseds is held. Among the images joining the procession are Saint Monica, Saint Augustine, Saint Nicholas of Tolentino, Saint Rita of Cascia, Saint Thomas of Villanova, Saint John of Sahagun, San William the Hermit, Saint Magdalene of Nagasaki, Saint Ezequiel Moreno and Our Lady of Consolation and the Cincture.
- May 4: Mexico's town fiesta is celebrated in honor of its patron saint, Saint Monica (Mother of Saint Augustine).
- September 4: The people of Mexico celebrate the feast of Virgen dela Consolacion y Correa (Our Lady of Consolation and the Cincture; Patroness of the Augustinian Order) during which they receive blessed cinctures imitating the gesture of the Virgin Mary giving her own cincture to Saint Monica during her grief and sorrow at her son's misgivings.
- September 10: The Sanikulas Festival is celebrated in honor of Saint Nicolas de Tolentino. Bread/cookies (a local delicacy in the town with arrowroot as their main ingredient) are eaten. The tradition is inspired by the story of San Nicolas when he was ill for some time and his advancement to old age started to manifest. He was about to die when his superiors asked him to eat a little meat (for he was a vegetarian) to be nourished, after all he is needed by his community and the souls in purgatory, which he had been praying for. Although he wanted to follow the advice of his superiors he also acknowledged the power and value of fasting towards God's merciful love. He then sought the help of the Virgin Mary through a prayer. Moved by his prayers, she appeared with the baby Jesus in her arms. She handed Nicolas a small piece of bread and asked him to dip it in the water contained in a chalice being held by the baby Jesus. Following her advice, he immediately recovered from his illness, and had more strength than he had ever had before. From then on, Nicolas would bless little pieces of bread, which he would hand out among the people for them to be healed.
- December 15–24: Christmas is welcomed by the annual "Lubenas Pascu". During this celebration, they parade colorful lanterns and decorated carrozas. According to Tantingco, Lubenas came from the word novena, which means nine days, referring to the nine-day simbang gabi. But while the rest of the country was content with attending dawn masses for nine consecutive days, Kapampangans went a step farther by holding a procession on the eve of every simbang gabi with a procession after dinner, which means they slept late, and then woke up before dawn for the simbang gabi (or simbang bengi in Kapampangan).

== Economy ==
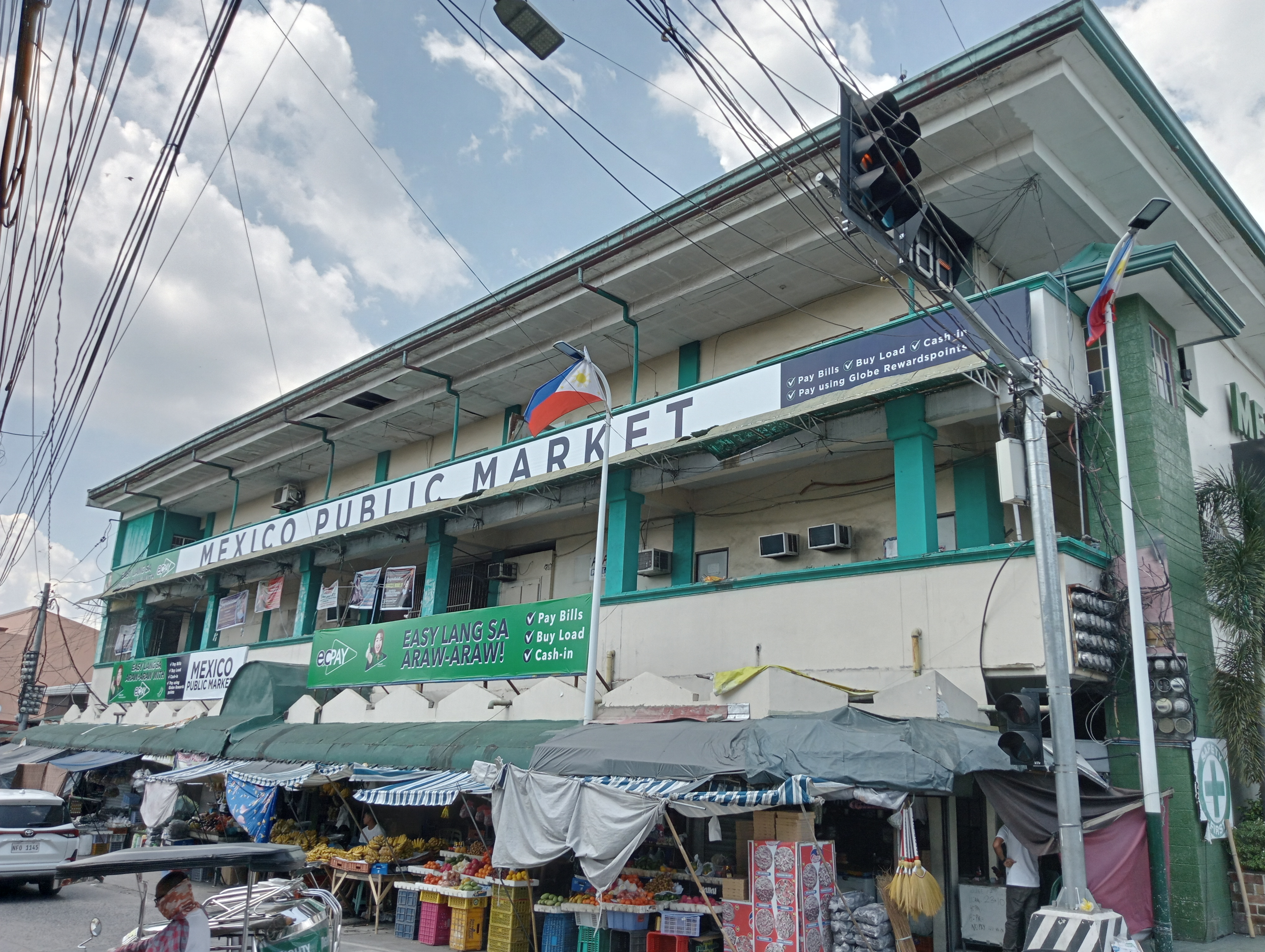
Mexico Public Market

Poverty incidence of Mexico (%)

Source: Philippine Statistics Authority

== Education ==
There are three schools district offices which govern all educational institutions within the municipality. They oversee the management and operations of all private and public, from primary to secondary schools. These are the Mexico North Schools District Office, Mexico South Schools District Office, and Mexico East Schools District Office.

=== Primary and elementary schools ===
- Acli Elementary School
- Anao Elementary School
- Basic Thoughts Learning Center
- Balas Elementary School
- Buenavista Elementary School
- Camuning Elementary School
- Cawayan Elementary School
- Concepcion Elementary School
- Culubasa Elementary School
- Divisoria Elementary School
- Dolores Elementary School
- Gandus Elementary School
- Eden Elementary School
- Lagundi Elementary School
- Laput Elementary School
- Laug Elementary School
- King James Christian Academy
- Malino Elementary School
- Masamat Elementary School
- Mexico Elementary School
- Mexico Ecumenical Development Center for Children
- Nueva Victoria Elementary School
- Our Lady of Guadalupe School Inc.
- Pandacaqui Elementary School
- Pandacaqui Resettlement Elementary School
- Pangatlan Elementary School
- Panipuan Elementary School
- Psalmers Christian School
- Sabanilla Elementary School
- San Antonio Elementary School
- San Lorenzo Elementary School
- San Jose Matulid Elementary School
- San Juan Elementary School
- San Patricio Elementary School
- San Rafael Elementary School
- San Vicente Elementary School
- Sapang Maisac Elementary School
- Springfields Christian School
- Sta. Cruz Elementary School
- Sta. Maria Elementary School
- Sto. Domingo Elementary School
- Sto. Rosario Elementary School
- Suclaban Elementary School
- San Miguel Elementary School
- Tangle Elementary School
- Upwardway Christian Learning Center

=== Secondary schools ===
- Diosdado Macapagal High School
- Divisoria High School
- Don Jesus Gonzales High School
- Gerry Rodriguez High School
- Malino National High School
- Mexico National High School
- Nicanor David Vergara High School
- San Juan High School
- St Joseph Academy

=== Higher educational institution ===
- Pampanga State University - Mexico Campus

== Books ==
- Gaspar de San Agustin, Conquistas de las Islas Filipinas 1565-1615, Translated by Luis Antonio Mañeru, 1st bilingual ed [Spanish and English], published by Pedro Galende, OSA: Intramuros, Manila, 1998
- Michael Raymon Tayag-Manaloto Pangilinan, Siuálâ ding Meángûbié.
- Gaspar de San Agustin, Conquistas de las Islas Filipinas; 1565–1615, 1st Bilingual Edition, Intramuros: 1998.
- Luciano P.R. Santiago, Laying the Foundations: Kapamangan Pioneers in the Philippine Church, 1592-2001, Angeles City: 2002.
- Mariano A. Henson, Pampanga and Its Towns (AD 1300-1965), Angeles: 1965.
- John Alan Larkin, The Pampangans: Colonial Society in a Philippine Province, Berkley, 1972.
- The Luther Parker Collection, Datos historicos de este municipio de Mexico, Provincia de la Pampanga, Islas Filipinas, translated from Spanish by Antonio Prima.
- The Historical Data Papers, Mexico, Bureau of Public Schools, 1953.
- Teresita Gimenez Maceda, Mga Tinig Mula sa Ibaba: Kasaysayan ng Partido Komunista ng Pilipinas at Partido Sosialista ng Pilipinas sa Awit, 1930–1955, QC, 1996.
- Yoshikawa Eiji, Taikóki (The History of the Life of Toyotomi Hideyoshi), Tokyo, 1967.
- Robby Tantingco, Lubenas is Pampanga's precious cultural gem. Indung Kapampangan. December 13, 2006.
