= List of Halik episodes =

Halik (International title: Betrayal / transl. Kiss) is a 2018 Philippine drama television series starring Jericho Rosales, Sam Milby, Yen Santos and Yam Concepcion. The series premiered on ABS-CBN's Primetime Bida evening block and worldwide via The Filipino Channel from August 13, 2018 to April 26, 2019, replacing Since I Found You.

== Series overview ==
Season	Episodes	Originally released	
Season	Episodes	First released	Last released
1	165	August 13, 2018	March 29, 2019
2	18	April 1, 2019	April 26, 2019

== Episodes ==
=== Season 1 (2018–19) ===
No. overall	No. in season	Title	Original release date	Kantar Media Ratings (nationwide)
1	1	"Ang Unang Halik"	August 13, 2018	18.2%
2	2	"Masarap na Halik"	August 14, 2018	19.0%
3	3	"Halik ng Pagdududa"	August 15, 2018	18.0%
4	4	"Alaala ng Halik"	August 16, 2018	16.8%
5	5	"Halik ng Pusong Sawi"	August 17, 2018	16.3%
6	6	"Pagpipigil ng Halik"	August 20, 2018	18.8%
7	7	"Nakakapagod na Halik"	August 21, 2018	19.0%
8	8	"Pambawing Halik"	August 22, 2018	19.3%
9	9	"Halik Ng Pagaalinlangan"	August 23, 2018	19.9%
10	10	"Palusot na Halik"	August 24, 2018	20.7%
11	11	"Maling Halik"	August 27, 2018	18.9%
12	12	"Halik ng Taksil"	August 28, 2018	19.5%
13	13	"Halik ng Pamilya"	August 29, 2018	19.4%
14	14	"PagmamaHALIK"	August 30, 2018	19.7%
15	15	"Halik ng Pagnanasa"	August 31, 2018	18.2%
16	16	"Bangis na Halik"	September 3, 2018	17.8%
17	17	"Nakaw na Halik"	September 4, 2018	16.9%
18	18	"Kontroladong Halik"	September 5, 2018	17.8%
19	19	"Mapanlinlang na Halik"	September 6, 2018	16.7%
20	20	"Halik ng Selosa"	September 7, 2018	17.5%
21	21	"Mamalungkot na Halik"	September 10, 2018	17.1%
22	22	"Patagong Halik"	September 11, 2018	16.8%
23	23	"Pilit na Halik"	September 12, 2018	15.5%
24	24	"Pinagtagpong Halik"	September 13, 2018	13.9%
25	25	"Hinahanap na Halik"	September 14, 2018	15.7%
26	26	"Halik ng Manloloko"	September 17, 2018	15.9%
27	27	"Walang Ganang Halik"	September 18, 2018	17.5%
28	28	"Patakas na Halik"	September 19, 2018	17.5%
29	29	"Makating Halik"	September 20, 2018	19.8%
30	30	"Mainit na Halik"	September 21, 2018	19.8%
31	31	"Palabang Halik"	September 24, 2018	19.2%
32	32	"Wasak na Halik"	September 25, 2018	21.2%
33	33	"Halik ng Nahuhulog"	September 26, 2018	21.3%
34	34	"Halik at Tukso"	September 27, 2018	19.4%
35	35	"Gigil na Halik"	September 28, 2018	18.9%
36	36	"Halik ng Nagbibintang"	October 1, 2018	18.5%
37	37	"Iniisip na Halik"	October 2, 2018	18.9%
38	38	"Halik ng Sinungaling"	October 3, 2018	18.1%
39	39	"Piling Halik"	October 4, 2018	18.1%
40	40	"Hiwalay na Halik"	October 5, 2018	17.2%
41	41	"Ganadong Halik"	October 8, 2018	20.0%
42	42	"Agawan ng Halik"	October 9, 2018	20.2%
43	43	"Halik at Oras"	October 10, 2018	20.1%
44	44	"Sorpresang Halik"	October 11, 2018	20.3%
45	45	"Pagtangkang Halik"	October 12, 2018	21.6%
46	46	"Sinaksak ng Halik"	October 15, 2018	20.5%
47	47	"Nagkataong Halik"	October 16, 2018	20.0%
48	48	"Harapang Halik"	October 17, 2018	20.9%
49	49	"Ebidensya ng Halik"	October 18, 2018	22.3%
50	50	"Handang Halik"	October 19, 2018	21.2%
51	51	"Tapatang Halik"	October 22, 2018	25.4%
52	52	"Mapanlokong Halik"	October 23, 2018	26.8%
53	53	"Halik ng Nanay"	October 24, 2018	26.0%
54	54	"Bistadong Halik"	October 25, 2018	27.1%
55	55	"Masakit na Halik"	October 26, 2018	27.5%
56	56	"Biktima ng Halik"	October 29, 2018	26.1%
57	57	"Ganting Halik"	October 30, 2018	25.0%
58	58	"Panandaliang Halik"	October 31, 2018	25.4%
59	59	"Mangaagaw ng Halik"	November 1, 2018	23.5%
60	60	"Kabadong Halik"	November 2, 2018	26.0%
61	61	"Mapangahas na Halik"	November 5, 2018	23.5%
62	62	"Halik ng Traydor"	November 6, 2018	26.2%
63	63	"Nagulantang na Halik"	November 7, 2018	25.1%
64	64	"Salpukang Halik"	November 8, 2018	29.3%
65	65	"Basang Halik"	November 9, 2018	27.2%
66	66	"Pagbabagong Halik"	November 12, 2018	28.4%
67	67	"Galit na Halik"	November 13, 2018	28.3%
68	68	"Saklolong Halik"	November 14, 2018	27.4%
69	69	"Nanlalamig Na Halik"	November 15, 2018	27.1%
70	70	"Eskandalong Halik"	November 16, 2018	27.2%
71	71	"Karmang Halik"	November 19, 2018	25.5%
72	72	"Resulta ng Halik"	November 20, 2018	26.4%
73	73	"Halik ng Kahihiyan"	November 21, 2018	26.7%
74	74	"Sugal na Halik"	November 22, 2018	25.9%
75	75	"Bumabalik na Halik"	November 23, 2018	24.9%
76	76	"Palihim na Halik"	November 26, 2018	24.9%
77	77	"Namumuong Halik"	November 27, 2018	24.9%
78	78	"Kampanteng Halik"	November 28, 2018	25.1%
79	79	"Bunga ng Halik"	November 29, 2018	27.3%
80	80	"Halik ng Katotohanan"	November 30, 2018	26.4%
81	81	"Halik ng Buntis"	December 3, 2018	25.7%
82	82	"Halik ng Desperada"	December 4, 2018	25.7%
83	83	"Tinanggihang Halik"	December 5, 2018	25.0%
84	84	"Halik at Malasakit"	December 6, 2018	25.9%
85	85	"Halik at Desisyon"	December 7, 2018	23.2%
86	86	"Halik at Aruga"	December 10, 2018	24.4%
87	87	"Malamig na Halik"	December 11, 2018	25.7%
88	88	"Inabusong Halik"	December 12, 2018	24.4%
89	89	"Bintang na Halik"	December 13, 2018	25.2%
90	90	"Sukdulang Halik"	December 14, 2018	23.1%
91	91	"Pinaglapit na Halik"	December 17, 2018	24.9%
92	92	"Balak na Halik"	December 18, 2018	24.3%
93	93	"Halik at Kalinga"	December 19, 2018	23.6%
94	94	"Mapanghusgang Halik"	December 20, 2018	23.3%
95	95	"Halik ng Pag-Aalaala"	December 21, 2018	24.3%
96	96	"Parusang Halik"	December 24, 2018	20.8%
97	97	"Pagtitiis ng Halik"	December 25, 2018	20.0%
98	98	"Realisasyon ng Halik"	December 26, 2018	25.2%
99	99	"Halik ng Kliyente"	December 27, 2018	24.6%
100	100	"Halik at Pananagutan"	December 28, 2018	23.8%
101	101	"Kabadong Halik"	December 31, 2018	19.2%
102	102	"Halik ng Ama"	January 1, 2019	21.6%
103	103	"Nakakaintrigang Halik"	January 2, 2019	24.7%
104	104	"Sagot sa Halik"	January 3, 2019	24.4%
105	105	"Kakayaning Halik"	January 4, 2019	23.5%
106	106	"Naipit na Halik"	January 7, 2019	23.9%
107	107	"Apektadong Halik"	January 8, 2019	25.1%
108	108	"Halik ng Pagkakataon"	January 9, 2019	23.8%
109	109	"Halik ng Umaasa"	January 10, 2019	23.5%
110	110	"Kastigong Halik"	January 11, 2019	23.5%
111	111	"Mabigat na Halik"	January 14, 2019	22.5%
112	112	"Pagpigil ng Halik"	January 15, 2019	24.0%
113	113	"Binugbog ng Halik"	January 16, 2019	22.8%
114	114	"Tatak ng Halik"	January 17, 2019	24.8%
115	115	"Pangalawang Halik"	January 18, 2019	23.8%
116	116	"Intensyong Halik"	January 21, 2019	23.6%
117	117	"Kahihinatnan ng Halik"	January 22, 2019	22.3%
118	118	"Komprontang Halik"	January 23, 2019	22.9%
119	119	"Mapanganib na Halik"	January 24, 2019	22.8%
120	120	"Magulong Halik"	January 25, 2019	23.4%
121	121	"Halik ng Rumeresbak"	January 28, 2019	22.4%
122	122	"Halik at Emosyon"	January 29, 2019	20.0%
123	123	"Pasabog na Halik"	January 30, 2019	22.1%
124	124	"Pigil na Halik"	January 31, 2019	23.4%
125	125	"Sapawan ng Halik"	February 1, 2019	23.5%
126	126	"Sabotaheng Halik"	February 4, 2019	24.6%
127	127	"Ipaglalaban na Halik"	February 5, 2019	22.1%
128	128	"Iniiwasang Halik"	February 6, 2019	23.6%
129	129	"Handog na Halik"	February 7, 2019	22.4%
130	130	"Paalam na Halik"	February 8, 2019	21.5%
131	131	"Nakakakabang Halik"	February 11, 2019	19.8%
132	132	"Timbangin ang Halik"	February 12, 2019	21.0%
133	133	"Inaangking Halik"	February 13, 2019	23.0%
134	134	"Inuwing Halik"	February 14, 2019	21.6%
135	135	"Naiiritang Halik"	February 15, 2019	20.6%
136	136	"Binabalaang Halik"	February 18, 2019	17.8%
137	137	"Halik at Pananabik"	February 19, 2019	21.1%
138	138	"Itinadhanang Halik"	February 20, 2019	20.9%
139	139	"Binabalak na Halik"	February 21, 2019	24.0%
140	140	"Palabang Halik"	February 22, 2019	22.6%
141	141	"Halik Bago Umalis"	February 25, 2019	24.6%
142	142	"Sinampal ng Halik"	February 26, 2019	24.2%
143	143	"Halik ng Naglayas"	February 27, 2019	22.5%
144	144	"Makasariling Halik"	February 28, 2019	23.4%
145	145	"Ngudngod na Halik"	March 1, 2019	25.1%
146	146	"Pagbawi ng Halik"	March 4, 2019	23.6%
147	147	"Nakakapraning na Halik"	March 5, 2019	23.1%
148	148	"Walang Respetong Halik"	March 6, 2019	25.7%
149	149	"Binilog na Halik"	March 7, 2019	25.6%
150	150	"Rambulang Halik"	March 8, 2019	25.2%
151	151	"Pasugod na Halik"	March 11, 2019	23.4%
152	152	"Paninindigang Halik"	March 12, 2019	24.0%
153	153	"Karapatan ng Halik"	March 13, 2019	23.6%
154	154	"Nakakabaliw na Halik"	March 14, 2019	23.3%
155	155	"Pagkakataong Halik"	March 15, 2019	24.0%
156	156	"Muling Ibalik na Halik"	March 18, 2019	24.8%
157	157	"Kasunduang Halik"	March 19, 2019	23.4%
158	158	"Tensyonadong Halik"	March 20, 2019	24.9%
159	159	"Testigong Halik"	March 21, 2019	24.5%
160	160	"Paglayo ng Halik"	March 22, 2019	22.7%
161	161	"Kaso ng Halik"	March 25, 2019	25.7%
162	162	"Eskapong Halik"	March 26, 2019	27.1%
163	163	"Arestadong Halik"	March 27, 2019	24.9%
164	164	"Kulong na Halik"	March 28, 2019	24.7%
165	165	"Halik kay CJ"	March 29, 2019	24.0%

=== Season 2 (2019) ===
No. overall	No. in season	Title	Original release date	Kantar Media Ratings (nationwide)
166	1	"Habulang Halik"	April 1, 2019	24.3%
167	2	"Pinagdasal na Halik"	April 2, 2019	24.5%
168	3	"Nakalayang Halik"	April 3, 2019	24.5%
169	4	"Banta ng Halik"	April 4, 2019	23.3%
170	5	"Ipaglalabang Halik"	April 5, 2019	25.1%
171	6	"Imbyernang Halik"	April 8, 2019	24.8%
172	7	"Nadamay sa Halik"	April 9, 2019	23.2%
173	8	"Emosyonal na Halik"	April 10, 2019	24.2%
174	9	"Labanan ng Halik"	April 11, 2019	24.6%
175	10	"Halik ng Konsensya"	April 12, 2019	24.3%
176	11	"Hatol ng Halik"	April 15, 2019	27.1%
177	12	"Kabayaran ng Halik"	April 16, 2019	26.8%
178	13	"Halik ng Kapahamakan"	April 17, 2019	25.9%
179	14	"Planadong Halik"	April 22, 2019	22.6%
180	15	"Umayaw sa Halik"	April 23, 2019	26.0%
181	16	"Patas na Halik"	April 24, 2019	25.4%
182	17	"Halik ng Batas"	April 25, 2019	27.0%
183	18	"Halik na Mamimiss Mo"	April 26, 2019	30.3%
