= Shopping (Ryan Bang song) =

Single by Ryan Bang featuring Donnalyn Bartolome

from the album Shopping
- Released: June 19, 2015
- Recorded: 2015
- Genre: P-pop/K-pop mashup
- Label: Skinny Fat Boy Productions
- Songwriter: Ryan Bang
- Producer: Viva

Ryan Bang singles chronology
"I Really Like It" (2011)	"Shopping" (2015)

Music video
- "Shopping" on YouTube

"Shopping" (Korean: 쇼핑; RR: Syopping) is a Korean-language song by South Korean comedian Ryan Bang (Bang Hyun Sung), one of the mainstays of ABS-CBN noontime show It's Showtime. The song features Donnalyn Bartolome.

== Music video ==
The song's accompanying music video was shot at the Resorts World Manila. The music video was shot in a style to Psy's singles "Gangnam Style" and "Gentleman".

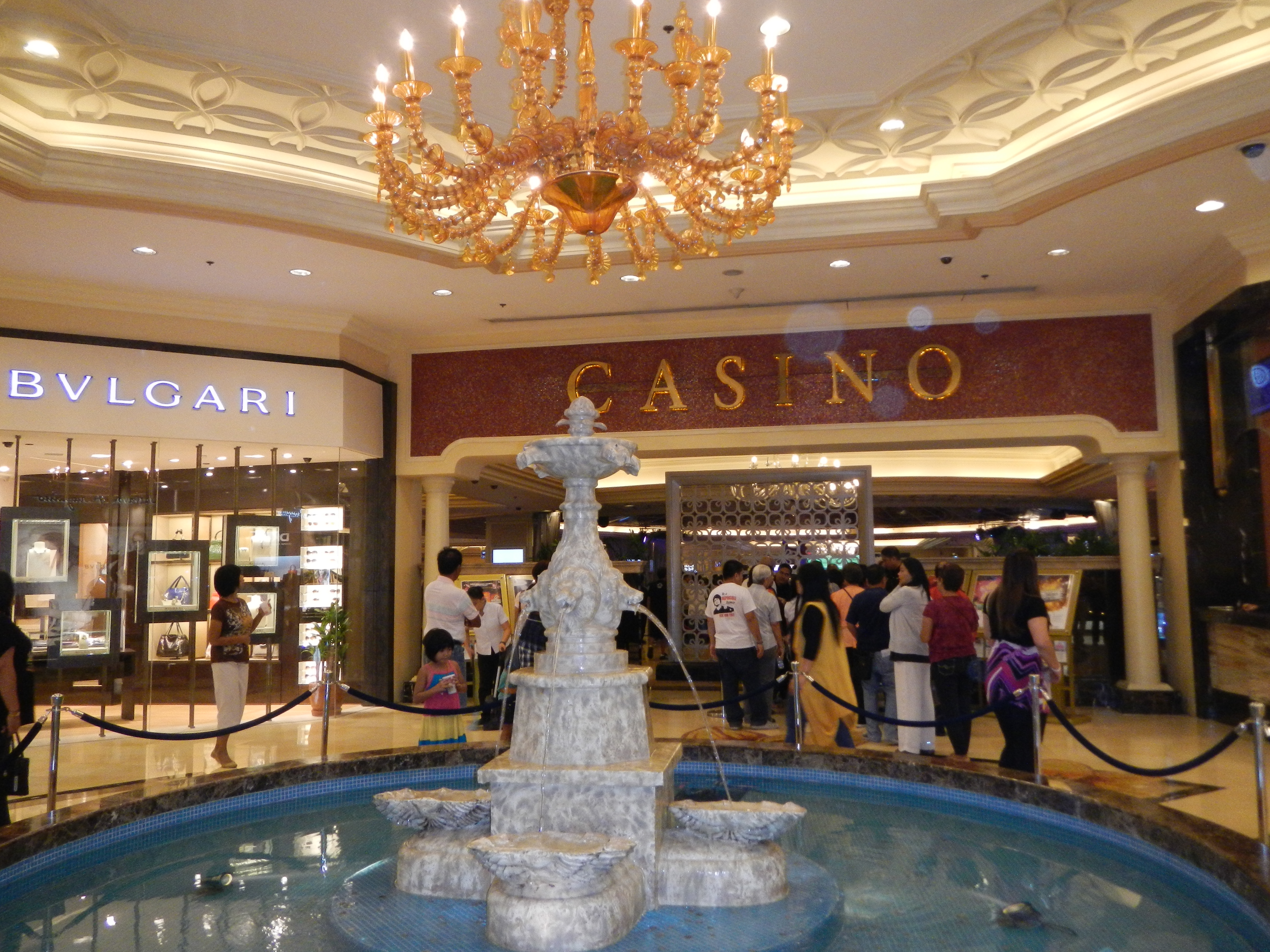
The Resorts World Manila Casino, where the music video was shot.

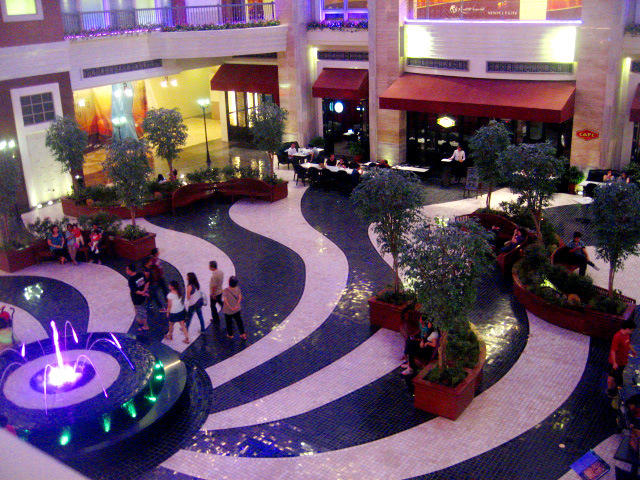
Newport City Mall atrium, where several parts of the video were also shot.

At the start of the video, a rich gambler (Jayson Gainza) plays at the Resorts World's casino slot machine, holding and inserting a bundle of US$100 notes to no success. At the adjacent machine, Bang takes out a US$2 bill from his pocket. This produces a triple-line jackpot and much money for Bang. The rest of the video sees Bang splurging his newfound wealth, dancing with lady valets (notably Girls of FHM Mayumi Yokoyama, Kristine Santamena, Donnalyn Bartolome, and Yam Concepcion), later riding on a Ferrari F430 and dancing and frolicking with fellow Pinoy Big Brother: Teen Clash 2010 housemate James Reid at the NewPort mall.

== Reception ==
Bang launched his single on June 16, 2015 (his 24th birthday) during an episode of It's Showtime, with the music video premiering on myx and YouTube. 2ne1 member Sandara Park also shared the new video via Twitter.

== Other uses ==
The song was used for a Fudgee Bar commercial with Alyssa Valdez, as Bang plays as volleyball coach.

== Notable cast ==
- Ryan Bang – protagonist
- Jayson Gainza – rich gambler
- James Reid – casino playmate
- Eruption – store owner
- Donnalyn Bartolome – valet
- Yam Concepcion – valet
- Kristine Santamena – valet
- Mayumi Yokoyama – valet
- Sunshine Garcia – dancer
- Aiko Climaco – dancer
