= Aiko Climaco =

Filipina dancer, actress and model

- Born: Aiko Climaco; 6 August 1989 (age 37); Quezon City, Philippines
- Occupations: Actress, model, singer, comedian, dancer
- Years active: 2004–present
- Height: 1.73 m (5 ft 8 in)
- Children: 2

Aiko Climaco (born 6 August 1989) is a Filipino actress, model and comedian. She was formerly known as a member of ASF dancer for Wowowee. She was a member for Banana Split Girls with former SexBomb Sunshine Garcia and Jef Gaitan, which featured in January 2014 issue of FHM Philippines, and being solo for February 2015. She also dubbed with volleyball superstar Rachel Anne Daquis as the Sexiest Twin Towers, which finally join with each other at the FHM BroCon (FHM 100 Sexiest Woman Party). Climaco with Myrtle Sarrosa led a newly formed girl group named Star Magic Angels.

== Filmography ==
=== Television ===
Year	Title	Role
2005–2010	Wowowee	Dancer
2010	Pilipinas Win na Win	Dancer
2010–2011	Willing Willie	Dancer
2012	My Binondo Girl	Lena
2013–2020	Banana Sundae	Various
2013	Gandang Gabi, Vice!	Guest
2014	Ipaglaban Mo: Ang Lahat Ng Sa Akin	Stella
2015	Ningning	Cristina Morales
2015	Kapamilya Deal or No Deal	Contestant/ Briefcase No. 10
2015	Pasion De Amor	Marga Avelino
2017	La Luna Sangre	Feliz
2018	Bagani	Bebe
2019	Jhon En Martian	Lucy
2019	Maalaala Mo Kaya: MVP	Denden
2021	I Left My Heart in Sorsogon	Aida
2021	Izla	Abi

=== Music video appearance ===
- Shopping (Ryan Bang feat. Donnalyn Bartolome, 2015 also with Yam Concepcion, James Reid and Jayson Gainza)

== Awards and recognition ==
=== FHM 100 Sexiest Woman ===
Year	Award	Category	Result	Won by	Note
2014	FHM Philippines	100 Sexiest Woman	Rank # 32	Marian Rivera (3)	Appeared for Jan. 2014 with Sunshine Garcia and Jef Gaitan
2015	FHM Philippines	100 Sexiest Woman	Rank # 20	Jennylyn Mercado	Appeared for Feb. 2015 issue

Preceded by Alice Dixson	FHM Cover Girl (January 2014) with Jef Gaitan and Sunshine Garcia	Succeeded by Phoemela Baranda
Preceded by Katrina Halili	FHM Cover Girl (February 2015)	Succeeded by Max Collins
