= Rastaman (internet personality) =

Filipino internet personality

- Plaza during an interview on Kapuso Mo, Jessica Soho in 2021
- Born: Rolando Plaza
- Other name: Rastaman
- Occupations: Technician; internet personality
- Known for: "Half-human, half-zombie" interviews
- Children: 2

Rolando Plaza, also known as Rastaman, is a Filipino internet personality and political aspirant. During the 2019 Philippine senatorial election, he described himself as "half-human, half-zombie" in an interviews. His facial tattoos and answers became popular in online memes and videos.

In a 2021 report, the Philippine Daily Inquirer reported on Plaza's popularity, citing a social media analysis by media analytics firm Isentia PH. The report linked the spread of memes about him to the use of humor during the 2022 election period and public frustration during the COVID-19 pandemic. Plaza's online popularity also led to appearances in videos with other personalities, including vlogger Donnalyn Bartolome and musician Juan Karlos Labajo.

== Life and career ==
Plaza grew up in Davao City and later lived in Bulacan. He studied to become a seaman and later worked in Saudi Arabia. He also worked as an appliance repair technician in his neighborhood.

=== Internet fame ===
Plaza gained attention during the filing of candidacies for the 2019 elections. In an interview, he responded to a question about becoming a senator with a line about his motorcycle, followed by the phrase "Half human, half zombie, yo!" His facial tattoos, including the words "Rasta" and "Man", and his bandana also became part of his online image. The interview spread online and inspired memes, edited images, and dance videos.

In 2021, the Philippine Daily Inquirer reported on Plaza's popularity, citing a social media analysis by media analytics firm Isentia PH ahead of the 2022 Philippine elections. The report linked the popularity of memes about Plaza to the use of humor during the election period. In November, singer and vlogger Donnalyn Bartolome featured Plaza in a video about his wish to experience an election campaign. In December, musician Juan Karlos Labajo shared photos with Plaza and jokingly called him his "long lost lolo".

=== Political candidacies and views ===
Plaza first ran for senator in the 2019 Philippine general election. The Commission on Elections (COMELEC) declared him a nuisance candidate and excluded him from the race. In 2021, Plaza said he had planned to run for president but could not continue after testing positive for COVID-19.

In October 2024, he filed another certificate of candidacy for senator in the 2025 Philippine general election. In November, COMELEC declared him one of the nuisance candidates for the election, excluding him from the ballot. Plaza has spoken about corruption, public services, and the country's territorial disputes with China. He said government funds should support health care and education. He also supported reproductive health, divorce, and same-sex marriage, and opposed the death penalty, martial law, political dynasties, and federalism. During his 2025 senatorial bid, Plaza also expressed support for restoring e-sabong, an online form of cockfighting that had been suspended in 2022.

== Personal life ==
According to Plaza, he had separated from his wife and had two children. He also spoke about a neighbor's daughter and linked her situation to his concerns about public services and government spending.

== Filmography ==
=== Film ===
Year	Title	Role	Ref.
2021	Kandado	Zombie	

=== Television ===
Year	Title	Role	Ref.
2021	Kapuso Mo, Jessica Soho	Himself	
