= Nightshift (2020 film) =

Philippine horror film

- Official movie poster
- Directed by: Yam Laranas
- Written by: Yam Laranas
- Produced by: Vincent del Rosario III; Veronique del Rosario-Corpus; Yam Laranas
- Starring: Yam Concepcion; Michael de Mesa
- Cinematography: Yam Laranas
- Edited by: Mae Carzon
- Music by: Oscar Fogelström
- Production companies: Aliud Entertainment; ImaginePerSecond
- Distributed by: Viva Films
- Release date: January 22, 2020
- Running time: 95 minutes
- Country: Philippines
- Language: Filipino

Nightshift is a 2020 Philippine horror film written, cinematographed, co-produced and directed by Yam Laranas. The film stars Yam Concepcion and Michael de Mesa.

== Synopsis ==
During the first few days at her new job, Jessie, a morgue assistant of Dr. Alex, a pathologist, is stuck working in a longer shift in a secluded hospital morgue on the day of typhoon. As exhaustion sets in, Jessie begins to experience terrifying visions, hearing eerie sounds and witnessing horrifying events where the corpses start to move and show signs of life.

== Cast ==
- Yam Concepcion as Jessie Pardo
- Michael de Mesa as Doctor Alex
- Mercedes Cabral as Nora
- Epy Quizon as Orderley
- Soliman Cruz as Orderley
- Ruby Ruiz as Head Nurse Bethany
- Mayen Estanero as Detective Jose
- Roman Perez Jr. as Detective Suarez
- Irma Adlawan as Jessie's Mother
- Caleb Santos as Jessie's Fiancé
- Joel Garcia as Elizabeth's Killer
- Karenina Romualdez as Doctor
- Brian Bamunuachchi as Shadow
- Jonjon Maceda as Shadow
- Maryanne Climaco as Shadow
- Lita Loresco as Mrs. Tabitha
- Sigrid Polon as Elizabeth
- Christian Villete as Billy
- Rafael Atun as Mr. Lazarus
- Jessa Mae Gajo as Nurse Gloria
- Shaider Vargas as Jairus
- Mico Akashi Dagaas as Jacob
- Antonio Adlawan as Homeless Man
- Mary Ann Tan as Woman with Miscarriage
- Liberty Galvez as Dead Chanter
- Red Musni as Dead Chanter
- Edith Monsanto as Dead Chanter
- Gerard Gevera as Jacob's Parent
- Jessica Nunez as Jacob's Parent
- Brenda Porcadilla as Crying Grandmother
- Sofia Nicole Mabalay as Daughter
- Isabel Tepase as Relative
- Regina Miano as E.R. Doctor
- Jackylyn Miano as Nurse
- Prince John Dale Pampanga as Nurse
- Coleen Que as Admin's Voice
- Lalaine Yulo as Voice at ICU Intercom
- Ariel Guevarra as Funeral Home Worker
- Albert Logacho as Funeral Home Worker

== Reception ==
Nightshift received negative reviews. Critics cite the film's low scare factor resulting from the excessive use of horror gimmicks, implausible scenes and the lack of insight of the characters played by Yam Concepcion and Michael de Mesa.
