= Amnesia Love =

2018 comedy film by Albert Langitan

- Theatrical release poster
- Directed by: Albert Langitan
- Produced by: Vicente Del Rosario III
- Starring: Paolo Ballesteros; Yam Concepcion; Polo Ravales; Vandolph; Maricel Morales
- Cinematography: Journalie Payonan
- Edited by: Mark Cyril Bautista
- Music by: Immanuel Verona
- Production company: Viva Films
- Distributed by: Viva Films
- Release date: February 28, 2018 (Philippines)
- Running time: 96 minutes
- Country: Philippines
- Language: Filipino
- Box office: ₱8.7 million

Amnesia Love is a Filipino love story comedy film written and directed by Albert Langitan, starring Paolo Ballesteros and Yam Concepcion. The film was produced by Viva Films a subsidiary of Viva Entertainment. The film was released in the Philippines on February 28, 2018.

== Plot ==
Paolo Ballesteros as a gay guy meets an accident and gets washed up in a remote island. He also trying to discover his true identity after being found unconscious in a remote island. When he wakes up he does not remember anything, including his gender orientation. He spends a few weeks in the island where he develops a romance with a barrio lass, until his boyfriend is able to locate him and everything is revealed to him.

== Cast ==
- Paolo Ballesteros as Kimmer
- Yam Concepcion as Doray
- Polo Ravales as Macky
- Vandolph as Edwin
- Chad Kinis as Buni
- Lander Vera-Perez as Lander Vera Perez
- Geleen Eugenio
- Sinon Loresca
- Alvin Maghanoy
- Shane Carrera
- Rhen Escaño as Rhen Escaño
- Debbie Garcia
- Jamilla Obispo
- Anykka Asistio
- Angelica Yap
- Echo
- Francis Rivera
- Pepita Curtis as Pepita Curtis Smith
- James Lomahan
- Rainier Morales
- Carmen Del Rosario
- Evelyn Santos
