= Yam Concepcion =

Filipino actress (born 1988)

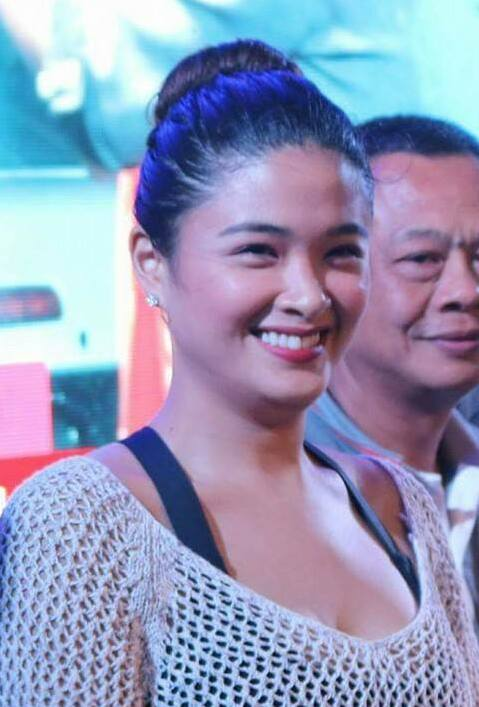
- Concepcion in 2018
- Born: Lorraine May Concepcion; May 27, 1988 (age 37)
- Other name: Yam
- Occupations: Singer, actress, model
- Years active: 2011–present
- Agent: Viva Artist Agency (2011–present)
- Height: 5 ft 4 in (163 cm) or 5 ft 2 in
- Spouse: Miguel Cuunjieng (m. 2021)
- Children: 1

Lorraine May "Yam" Concepcion-Cuunjieng (born May 27, 1988) is a Filipino actress known for her role in the erotic thriller movie Rigodon directed by Erik Matti, and she rose to fame on the 2013 daytime television series Dugong Buhay alongside Ejay Falcon and Arjo Atayde.

== Personal life ==
She graduated high school at Assumption College San Lorenzo. She finished a degree in Multimedia Arts at De La Salle-College of Saint Benilde.

On June 23, 2021, Concepcion announced her engagement with boyfriend Miguel CuUnjieng, who is living and working in New York. They married on July 25, 2021. Her first child was born in 2024.

== Filmography ==
=== Film ===
| Year | Title | Role |
|---|---|---|
| 2011 | Who's That Girl? | Cameo |
| 2011 | Won't Last a Day Without You | Anne |
| 2011 | The Unkabogable Praybeyt Benjamin | Cameo |
| 2012 | Rigodon | Sarah |
| 2013 | She's the One | Cameo |
| 2014 | The Gifted | Cameo |
| 2014 | Moron 5.2: The Transformation | Selina |
| 2015 | Nilalang | Akane |
| 2015 | Pangil sa Tubig | Elaine |
| 2016 | This Time | Annie Buhay / Ate Pards |
| 2016 | Pangil sa Tubig | |
| 2016 | Magtanggol | |
| 2016 | Bakit Lahat ng Gwapo may Boyfriend? | Fiona |
| 2017 | Fangirl Fanboy | |
| 2018 | Amnesia Love | Doray |
| 2020 | Nightshift | Jessie |

=== Television ===
| Year | Title | Role |
|---|---|---|
| 2013–2022 | ASAP | Herself / Performer |
| 2013 | Carlo J. Caparas' Dugong Buhay | Sandy De Guzman |
| 2013 | Maalaala Mo Kaya: Medalya | Daisy |
| 2014 | Maalaala Mo Kaya: Sanggol | Myra |
| 2014 | Pure Love | Kayla Santos |
| 2014 | Ipaglaban Mo: Ibigay Ang Aming Karapatan | Maribeth |
| 2014 | Maalaala Mo Kaya: Bukid | Leng |
| 2015 | Two Wives | Michelle Olasco |
| 2015 | Kapamilya, Deal or No Deal | Herself / Briefcase #5 |
| 2015 | Ipaglaban Mo: Hanggang Sa Huli | Norie |
| 2015 | All of Me | Bianca Rellosa |
| 2016 | Ipaglaban Mo: Kapitbahay | Claire |
| 2016–2017 | Langit Lupa | Priscilla "Lala" Gutierrez |
| 2017 | FPJ's Ang Probinsyano | Magdelena "Lena" Dumaguit |
| 2018–2019 | Halik | Jade Flores-Bartolome |
| 2019 | Uncoupling | Alex |
| 2020 | Love Thy Woman | Dana Wong-Chao |
| 2021 | Init sa Magdamag | Cong. Rita Macatangay-Alvarez / Rita Macatangay-Salcedo |

=== Music video appearance ===
- Sinungaling (Mayonnaise, 2013)
- Shopping (Ryan Bang, 2015, also featuring Jayson Gainza, Aiko Climaco, Donnalyn Bartolome, Kristine Santamena and Mayumi Yokoyama)

| Preceded by Melissa Ricks | FHM Cover Girl (October 2012) | Succeeded by Ritz Azul |
| Preceded by Arianny Celeste | FHM Cover Girl (September 2015) | Succeeded by Danielle Castaño, Queenie Rehmann and Cindy Miranda |
