= Halik (TV series) =

- Title card
- Also known as: Betrayal
- Genre: Melodrama; Romance; Revenge
- Created by: ABS-CBN Studios; Tanya Winona Bautista- Navarro
- Developed by: ABS-CBN Studios
- Written by: Maribel Ilag; Chie Floresca; Raymund Barcelon; Jose Ruel L. Garcia; Edeline B. Romero; Arnold Saño Galicia
- Directed by: Carlo Po Artillaga; Cathy O. Camarillo
- Starring: Jericho Rosales; Sam Milby; Yen Santos; Yam Concepcion
- Opening theme: "Halik" by Aegis
- Composer: Celso Abenoja
- Country of origin: Philippines
- Original language: Filipino
- No. of seasons: 2
- No. of episodes: 183 (list of episodes)

Production
- Executive producers: Carlo Katigbak; Cory Vidanes; Laurenti Dyogi; Ruel Bayani
- Producers: Mavic Holgado-Oducayen†; Celeste Villanueva Lumasac; Edyl Macy de los Santos; Mafe Callo; Sir Emerson Lavilla Verastigue
- Production locations: Metro Manila; Antipolo; New York City, USA
- Editor: Bernie Diasanta
- Running time: 30–45 minutes
- Production company: RSB Unit now (RSB Scripted Format)

Original release
- Network: ABS-CBN
- Release: August 13, 2018 – April 26, 2019

Related
- Two Wives (2014)

Halik (International title: Betrayal / transl. Kiss) is a Philippine television drama series broadcast by ABS-CBN. Directed by Carlo Po Artillaga and Cathy O. Camarillo, it stars Jericho Rosales, Sam Milby, Yen Santos and Yam Concepcion. It aired on the network's Primetime Bida line up and worldwide on TFC from August 13, 2018 to April 26, 2019, replacing Since I Found You and was replaced by Sino ang Maysala?: Mea Culpa.

== Premise ==
Halik begins with four people's lives are intertwined in a complicated web of love, lies, and deception. Lino (Jericho Rosales), Jacky (Yen Santos), Jade (Yam Concepcion), and Ace (Sam Milby) get entangled in an unpredictable situations where they become hapless victims of circumstance. Will they still be able to redeem themselves and escape the pit they have dug themselves into.

=== The Beginning ===
Halik is a fictional story of two marriages, marred by temptation, discontentment, misunderstandings, and other relationship problems.

This fictional teleserye follows the lives of two childhood friends, Jacky Montefalco (Yen Santos) and Lino Bartolome (Jericho Rosales), torn apart by a vengeful man and then thrust together by a cruel twist of fate, and betrayal.

Jacky is the heiress of MonteCorp Furniture, a renowned furniture establishment in the Philippines and Asia. She is the only daughter of Mauro and Loida Montefalco (Precious Lara Quigaman), prominent members of society in the country and owners of MonteCorp. Jacky learns early on that she is not the natural offspring of the man she thought was her father. Nevertheless, she longs for her adoptive father's acceptance.

Mauro Montefalco (Romnick Sarmenta) is a cruel man who kills his wife's lover in a jealous rage, and raises her daughter as his legal child. This is as far as his benevolence goes as he is extremely cruel and dismissive to his daughter. Though he keeps up with the filial appearances to save his face, he dislikes his daughter and directs his anger on her and the Bartolome family who he blames for his unhappiness.

Agustin "Gustin" Bartolome (Allan Paule) is a talented furniture designer whose pieces are much sought after. It is through Agustin that Loida meets her lover, Robert Oliva. Loida is the suffering wife of the domineering Mauro. The couple fall in love. Loida attempts to leave Mauro to join Robert but he is killed. Jacky is the fruit of their relationship.

=== MonteCorp ===
MonteCorp, originally the Ybañez Furniture of Cebu, is a well known furniture company founded by the Ybañez family, Loida's parents. Close family friend and furniture designer, Gustin Bartolome designs their furniture products, and when Mauro takes over the reins of Ybañez Furniture after his in-laws retire, he keeps Gustin in his employ.

Years later and rebranded as MonteCorp, the company expands into the Asian market, but their financial growth and success are marred by his discontented furniture workers who are underpaid and maltreated. Neither does he give credit to his designers for their creations. In a labor dispute with his workers, Gustin Bartolome is killed in a suspicious warehouse fire. Mauro steals Gustin's portfolio, a worn out sketch book containing numerous drawings of furniture that have not yet been executed, all signed by the designer and dedicated to his family. It is this sketch book that Gustin was searching for when the fire started in the factory's storage and lost his life.

Gustin's death results to a parting of ways and bitterness between the Bartolomes and the Montefalcos, and the childhood best friends and teenage sweethearts part ways.

Years pass. Agustin's son, Lino establishes a furniture design group called Dos Disenyos. His modern, fast forward designs catch the attention of the younger market and he becomes a serious contender to MonteCorp's market share. Lino is certain MonteCorp is using his father's personal sketches but is not able to prove it because of the missing portfolio. He suspects Mauro is responsible for his father's death.

Before the fire that took his father's life, Lino spent many years watching his father sketch as he explained each design details and the inspiration behind them. It is this intimate knowledge of his father's designs that Lino is able to recognize his father's personal sketches among MonteCorp's award-winning pieces.

=== Lino and Jade ===
Years later Lino falls deeply in love and marries a realty agent named Jade Flores (Yam Concepcion), and like other couples, have plans and dreams of their future together as a family. They suffer the loss of their first child from a late term miscarriage, an event that significantly impacts Jade. The loss brings Postpartum depression onto Jade, as she begins to suffer mood swings and bizarre behavior, and experiences restlessness which she blames on their home life and the extended family living with them.

Jade longs for the privacy of a house of their own, independent from her in-laws. Sharing her house with an extended family becomes a bone of contention between the couple and they argue incessantly over it.

Meanwhile, as he struggles to understand Jade, Dos Disenyos is on the brink of success, which distracts him from Jade's anxieties.

=== Jacky and Ace ===
Meanwhile, Jacky marries Ace Corpuz (Sam Milby), the eldest son of her father's business partner. Jacky is very much in love with him, despite her suspicions of his womanizing. In fact, Ace is a serial womanizer who is glib enough to get away with his philandering.

Although Ace has no qualms about his liaisons, he becomes very jealous of Lino when they all run into each other during a furniture trade exposition in Bali, Indonesia. The childhood friends had not seen each other since they broke up a decade ago. Ace's unreasonable jealousy drives him to get back at Lino and he does this the only way he knows how - pursue and seduce Lino's wife.

=== The Affair ===
By a cruel twist of fate, Lino and Jacky's lives collide once more when their spouses, Jade and Ace, are entangled in a scandalous affair. At the same time, Jacky's mother dies from a self inflicted gunshot to her chest, which Jacky refuses to believe. In fact, Jacky's suspicions are not far off when it is eventually revealed that Mauro did shoot Loida accidentally, in a fit of rage when Loida tells him she is leaving him. Mauro bribes the Coroner to fake the autopsy results.

Days before her death, she returns Gustin's missing portfolio to Lino and his family. And after years of advising her daughter to defer to her father's wishes, she gives Jacky permission to free herself from her domineering father.

Jacky is baffled by her mother's suicide but her death leaves Jacky with a larger stake in MonteCorp, a seat in the board, and a significant say in the company. This allows Jacky the freedom to resign from her father without compromising her ownership in the firm.

Meanwhile, Jacky and Lino experience the heaviest trial in their respective marriages: the devastating discovery of their spouses' affair.

As Mauro and the Corpuzes escalate their revenge against Dos Disenyos with underhanded tactics and industrial espionage, Jacky uses her clout to thwart their plans. Devastated and heartbroken over Ace's betrayal, she throws Ace out of their home.

Lino also fights back. He sues Mauro for stealing his father's designs, but the Corpuzes pay the fiscal to drop the case for lack of merit. Completely devastated over Jade's betrayal, Lino struggles to overcome his feelings for her and focuses on moving on.

=== The Aftermath ===
As more secrets and scandals are exposed, the two betrayed spouses, Lino and Jacky, join forces to reckon with their respective spouses and attempt to close the painful chapters of their past. Jacky leaves MonteCorp and joins Dos Disenyos and the duo draw in more projects and the company expands even more.

Mauro suffers a debilitating stroke, and the real enemy emerges: Paeng Corpuz. Ace and his father team up to take over MonteCorp, which turns out to be Paeng's plan from the start. They get financing from a mysterious venture capitalist Aliyah Torres who wants to purchase MonteCorp. Unknown to the Corpuzes, Aliyah has another agenda, an axe to grind against Mauro and she intends to destroy MonteCorp with him and the entire Corpuz family.

While Mauro is incapacitated, they institute board resolutions that overrules Mauro's directives despite his majority stock control. Mauro is about to lose MonteCorp to the Corpuzes.

Jacky wrestles with the dilemma: to help her father who rejected her throughout her entire life and save the company founded by her grandparents? Or does she turn her back on the people who give her so much grief? Jacky chooses to save the company founded by her grandparents and resigns from Dos Disenyos. This pleases Mauro, who has, since his stroke, a change of heart towards his daughter. Mauro realizes Jacky's value and thanks her for not giving up on him. Jacky is overwhelmed and they reconcile.

Lino and Jacky also face new challenges: a rekindling of their friendship is complicated by Jade's pregnancy and the DNA test confirming Lino is the father. Both are cautious and guarded about their feelings.

Unexpectedly, a new love interest comes into Jacky's world, giving rise to Lino's jealousy. But Jade's pregnancy is tenuous, and so he takes her in because he feels responsible for his child.

Jade, realizing her mistakes, tries her best to make up for her betrayal, but Lino tells her it is too late. When she overhears Lino tell Jacky that he no longer loves Jade as he once did, the painful realization that she lost Lino for good triggers a premature labor and birth of their son. Memories of their first child shake them up. Parenthood prevails as they try to set aside a barrage of emotions resulting from the complications of their relationship.

Meanwhile, Lino understands Jacky's decision to resign and gives his blessings but struggles to control his feelings for her, especially now that her relationship with Yohan Tanaka (Daniel Matsunaga) appears serious.

After a month in an incubator, Lino's son CJ finally comes home from the hospital and the Bartolomes welcome the newest member of the family with joyous anticipation of new beginnings. Unfortunately, happiness does not come easy. Jade once again suffers from Postpartum depression and struggles with nursing her son. Determined to win back Lino, she can't accept that he no longer loves her. Emotions run high in a household hoping the worst has past. Ill feelings create conflict within their family and additional stress on her depressed state. His friendship with Jacky gives rise to unreasonable jealousies. Try as he might, the current set up is not working well for Lino, who despite his desire to do right for his son, is unable to get Jade to understand that they are no longer a couple.

Desperate to win back Lino's affection, Jade takes measures in her own hand with disastrous results. Failing to seduce him, she runs away with baby CJ, and the infant catches the measles and ends up in hospital.

Ace is aware of the Bartolomes' movements, and brings Jade and the baby to the hospital. This is what Jacky and Nanay Dolor sees when they get to the hospital.

=== Montefalcos vs Corpuzes ===
Meanwhile, Dos Disenyos' first day without Jacky is uneventful. Basté is back as Project Manager and she easily picks up from where Jacky left off. She also shares information she obtained from her investigations.

Over at MonteCorp, Jacky and Mauro's first day back is contentious. They are advised that the Board's legal counsel is preparing to execute documents for a corporate takeover. The Montefalcos are dismayed that the additional infusion of funds from Aliyah dilutes Mauro's and Jacky's majority shares in the company. A larger share bloc composed of Aliyah and the Corpuzes now make up the majority. A Board resolution made possible because Paeng Corpuz had obtained Mauro's signed approval to sell a bloc of shares to Aliyah, while sedated in the hospital after his stroke.

A catfight ensues between Jacky and Aliyah when MonteCorp's production lead advises Jacky that the company's signature designs are being phased out by Aliyah, despite the fact that these are the company's best selling products.

Jacky has Aliyah investigated and learns her real name is Aliyah Vegafria, the only daughter of Manuel Vegafria, an up-and-coming furniture business in Davao in the early 80s who committed suicide.

Elsewhere, Aliyah visits a Columbarium where her father's ashes are inurned. She recalls the painful day her father kills himself in front of her school. In their last conversation, he warns her not to trust Mauro Montefalco. Suffering the trauma of her father's suicide, Aliyah swears her revenge on the Montefalcos.

Something about the name Manuel Vegafria is also vaguely familiar to Mauro. He pays a visit to a former employee inquiring about Manuel, who reminds him about the day the man burst into their boardroom demanding Mauro to return his family's money. It turns out that Manuel loses all his family's money from his investments in MonteCorp. Alarmed, he warns Jacky about Aliyah and promises he will update her as he gets credible information. Although Mauro barely recalls the incident, he pays Paeng Corpuz a visit to find out more information, well aware of the fact that in those early days, Paeng Corpuz handled all the trouble shooting and fixed issues.

=== Child Custody ===
Jade gives birth prematurely to her baby boy CJ, and uses this to her advantage to get close to Lino who allows her to stay in their home. Her hopes to win back Lino's heart is dashed when Jacky reveals that she is still in love with Lino. Desperate, she runs away with CJ while Lino is away in New York on a business trip. The newborn hasn't had his vaccines yet and as a result, is exposed to measles. Ace, who is stalking the Bartolomes, is notified and takes the opportunity to prey on Jade's fears and tries to win her trust. He feigns a mercy mission to bring Jade and her baby to the hospital.

Lino cuts his business trip short when he senses things aren't right back home. Furious when he learns that Jade put their son at risk, he realizes she will never change, her selfishness is a deterrent to any possibility to become a family, to regain back his trust and love he once felt for her.

While he tries to figure out their living arrangements, Jade agrees to stay with the Bartolomes and promises to not cause trouble. But despite living in a separate unit downstairs, her in laws can barely tolerate her presence. Maggie taunts Jade about Ace which leads to a physical brawl, with Auntie Fe joining in the fray. Furious, Lino finally throws Jade out of their home and files for sole custody of CJ.

Desperate, Jade seeks help from Ace who is eager to create more turmoil in Lino's life. He fakes another DNA test to disprove Lino's previous DNA results and claim his paternity. Accompanied by the local Kagawad and holding falsified DNA results at the Bartolome residence, Jade and Ace demand to take back the child. A violent altercation occurs between Ace and Lino while Jade escapes with CJ. Nanay Dolor collapses from a stroke.

=== Desperation ===
Jacky's return to MonteCorp restores their clients' confidence. Her successful exhibit showcasing MonteCorp's signature classic pieces and her new designs boosts sales for the first time since she resigned and the Corpuzes took over.

Meanwhile, Aliyah is frustrated that the Montefalcos have returned, and worse, Jacky is saving the company and regaining the Board's trust. Furious with Ace's distraction over his pursuits towards making Lino's life miserable, she decides to take matters in her hands and attempts to kill Jacky, but is unsuccessful.

As Aliyah's plans for revenge unravels, she lashes out at Ace and admits to planning for MonteCorp's downfall, including the Montefalcos and the Corpuzes. She threatens to pull out her funds from the firm.

Fearing his family's financial ruin and the failure for his own plans to destroy Lino, Ace decides to stop Aliyah from pulling the plug on the firm. He drugs Aliyah's drink with a fatal dosage of her antidepressants and sleeping pills. In a last desperate attempt to seek help, Aliyah calls Jackie to warn her. But because of the bad blood between them, and her drugged state, Jacky can't quite make sense of Aliyah's phone call. When she sends Ken and Chari to Aliyah's house the next day, they watch Aliyah's corpse being taken to the morgue, her death ruled as suicide.

Elsewhere, Basté discovers suspicious files recovered from a flash drive she mysteriously receives during the course of her own investigation of Mauro and Paeng months back after she left Dos Disenyos. The files contain land titles of various properties, and fund transfers from the company accounts to the Corpuz' alias bank accounts. She shows the files to Jacky who has Mauro look at them. Mauro confirms the illegal transactions and tells Jackey he will get additional documents to help her.

Meanwhile, Lino is desperate to get his child away from Jade who has moved in with Ace. With Gio's and Tet's help, Lino is able to keep track of his son's whereabouts and welfare. Lino's legal team presses him to file Adultery charges against Jade and Ace, arguing that this is the strongest means to get full custody. The lawyers explain that the law always defers to the mother, but Adultery is a crime punishable by jail. With Jade in jail, Lino has rights for full custody.

While Lino's lawyers prepare to file for sole custody and substantiate the adultery charges, they advise Lino to stay away from Ace and Jade, to avoid altercations between them are not used against Lino's claims to provide a safe and healthy environment for his son.

His legal team builds a strong case against Jade and Ace on the grounds of adultery, with credible testimonies from Jade's friend Tet, Basté and Dolor Bartolome. Although Lino is tempted to take his son away, he places his trust in the legal system's due process.

When the Fiscal's office find merit in Lino's charges against Jade and Ace, someone tips off Ace that a warrant of arrest is issued against them. Helen provides them two separate units in their building where they hide temporarily so they are not in Ace's unit during the police's first attempt to arrest them.

With only a matter of time before the trio are caught, Helen Corpuz devises a plan to save Ace and keep Jade away for good. Knowing full well that Jade would never let CJ out of her sight, Helen bribes Jade's sister to trick Jade with entrusting CJ to her. When Ace and Jade are finally arrested, Helen promises to have them both released on bail, after which Jade and CJ would leave the country for good to escape the Adultery trial.

The warrant is successfully served on Jade and she is arrested but to Lino's dismay, CJ is missing. His frantic search for his son leads him to Jade's sister, Ruby.

Meanwhile, Helen has Jade's bail raised, delaying Jade's plans to retrieve CJ and run away with Ace. Ruby panics, contacts Ace who brings them to another motel to hideout as they wait for Jade's release.

Gio, who is trailing Ace, tips off Lino on Ruby and CJ's new location and rescues CJ. Their joy is short-lived as Jade is released and with the law still on her side, retrieves CJ. Lino has no choice except to wait for Jade and Ace's trial for adultery.

In a new turn of events, a mysterious woman calls Jacky offering information regarding Ace, Paeng and Mauro. The caller reveals to be Aliyah, who survived the drug overdose and faked her suicide after being saved by her doctor friend. She executes her revenge on Mauro and succeeds in destroying his newly reconciled relationship with Jacky.

=== Finale ===
The court trial ends with a guilty verdict for both Jade and Ace for the crime of adultery. The emotional testimonies of Lino, Jacky, and Dolor sealed the judge's decision. The Corpuzes appeal while Ace arranges to leave the country with Jade through the back door. They plan to kidnap CJ who is safely reunited with the Bartolomes. Meanwhile, Paeng and Helen are on the run as Mauro implicates them. In a last desperate act against the Montefalcos, Paeng plants a chemical gas attack inside the warehouse almost killing its employees, including Ken and Jacky. Luckily, Lino arrives in time to save them. Jacky recognizes Paeng in the CCTV footage. After CJ's christening, Jade abducts CJ and escapes with Ace. Aliyah is waiting for them when they arrive at the private hangar, ready to kill them both. Ace outwits Aliyah and strangles her to death. As Jade witnesses the murder, she realizes her biggest mistake of depending on Ace to provide for her. She tries to escape with CJ but is confronted by Ace. He forces her to join him as he drives off to meet up with his mother, Helen.

Tracking Jade's phone, Lino and Jacky arrive at the Hangar and sees investigating authorities surrounding Aliyah's lifeless corpse. Ace and Jade are gone.

Shortly after, Jacky comes across Helen carrying CJ. Jacky tries to convince Helen to hand her the baby but Helen pushes them both into the river and escapes. Lino arrives in time to save Jacky and his son.

Meanwhile, Jade angrily stops Ace from driving, manages to get the handgun from him, and shoots him on his shoulder to stop the car. Remembering Ace's despicable deeds leading to her ruined life, she shoots at his manhood. Jade coughs up blood and collapses.

At the hospital, Lino informs Jade that she has Tuberculosis which she picked up from the inmates in prison. Jade realizes all her decisions and apologizes to Jacky. Lino promises her that he would raise CJ with no enmity towards his mother.

The Corpuzes are arrested and convicted and serve life sentences for their crimes.

Ace is raped and humiliated by his inmates. Similar harsh lives are experienced by Paeng and Helen.

Jacky visits Mauro in prison to say goodbye before she leaves for San Francisco where she lives for a good part of a decade to heal.

She decides to return home after she reads a magazine article on her father, who decides to make his life in prison worthwhile by teaching his inmates furniture making skills and gives them personal development courses. He is dubbed a renaissance man.

Gio writes Paeng, Helen, and Ace letters extending his forgiveness and assured them that he will not stop loving them. Of the three, Ace takes accountability, joins a bible group, and resumes a relationship with his brother.

Lino becomes even more successful with Dos Disenyos and faithfully visits Jade in prison with CJ. He remains true to his word that CJ will know his mother and love her in return.

Jade serves out her term and is released to reunite with an older CJ. On her first night as a free individual, she asks CJ to sleep over and Lino agrees.

Lino's annulment case against her is passed and their marriage is thus annulled.

Lino then visits Jacky who returns to the Philippines. The final part of the story ends with Gio reuniting with a reformed Ace at prison to renew their family’s relationship, Jade happily spends time with her son CJ, and both Lino and Jacky begin their relationship.

== Cast and characters ==
=== Main cast ===
- Jericho Rosales as Catalino "Lino" S. Bartolome
- Sam Milby as Ace M. Corpuz
- Yam Concepcion as Jade Flores-Bartolome
- Yen Santos as Jacqueline "Jacky" Y. Montefalco-Corpuz

=== Supporting cast ===
- Amy Austria as Dolores "Dolor" Salvador-Bartolome
- Romnick Sarmenta as Mauricio "Mauro" Montefalco
- Precious Lara Quigaman as Loida Ybañez-Montefalco†
- Cris Villanueva as Rafael "Paeng" Corpuz
- Almira Muhlach as Helen Martin-Corpuz
- Hero Angeles as Atty. Kenneth "Ken" Velasco
- Christian Bables as Barry Sebastian
- Chai Fonacier as Chari Ortiz
- Jane de Leon as Margarita "Maggie" S. Bartolome
- Niña Dolino as Marissa Callao
- Ria Atayde as Pinky "Baste" Sebastian
- Bianca King as Aliyah Torres
- Gab Lagman as Gio M. Corpuz
- Daisy Cariño as Fe Bartolome
- Crispin Pineda as Ed Bartolome
- Karla Pambid as Matutina "Tet" Rosales

=== Guest cast ===
- Allan Paule as Agustin "Gustin" Bartolome
- Sandino Martin as Gabriel "Gab" Montefalco
- Art Acuña as Al Montefalco
- Jef Gaitan as Ivory Jimenez
- Luis Hontiveros as Eric Dela Vega
- Noel Colet as Ben Seropon
- Loren Burgos as Celine Ricafort
- John Spainhour as John Ricafort
- Irma Adlawan as Myrna Toledo
- Daniel Matsunaga as Yohan Tanaka
- Bobby Andrews as Manuel Vegafria
- Malou Canzana as Ruby Flores-Patel
- Lollie Mara as Cecille Tuazon

== Production ==
=== Tentative title ===
The series was first announced on September 27, 2017 with the title Love Will Lead You Back. However, it was changed to Ang Halik Mo and later announced that the final title of the series would be Halik.

=== Premiere ===
In June 2018, announced that the series was set to premiere on June 25, 2018. The series was pushed back to August 13, 2018, and a full trailer was released on July 19, 2018.

== Broadcast ==
Halik premiered on August 13, 2018.

=== Reruns ===
The show began airing re-runs on Jeepney TV from February 22 to September 5, 2020 replacing the rerun of Nasaan Ka Nang Kailangan Kita and was replaced by the rerun of Two Wives and March 29, 2025 to January 31, 2026 replacing the rerun of Good Vibes and was replaced by the rerun of Magkaribal.

=== International broadcast ===
- Tanzania – Azam TV (February 2019)

== Ratings ==
Kantar Media National TV Ratings (9:20 PM PST)
Pilot Episode	Finale Episode	Peak	Average
18.2% August 13, 2018	30.3% April 26, 2019	30.3% April 26, 2019	TBD

== Awards and nominations ==
Year	Award giving body	Category	Recipient	Results					
2019	33rd PMPC Star Awards for TV	Best Primetime Drama Series	Halik	Nominated	2019	33rd PMPC Star Awards for TV	Best Ensemble Drama Series	Halik	{{{2}}}

== See also ==
- List of programs broadcast by ABS-CBN
- List of ABS-CBN Studios original drama series
- List of programs broadcast by Jeepney TV
