= List of Love Thy Woman episodes =

Love Thy Woman is a Philippine drama television series broadcast by Kapamilya Channel. The series premiered on ABS-CBN's Kapamilya Gold afternoon block and worldwide via The Filipino Channel from February 10 to September 11, 2020, replacing Kadenang Ginto.

== Series overview ==
Season	Episodes	Originally released		
Season	Episodes	First released	Last released	Network
1	95	February 10, 2020	September 11, 2020	ABS-CBN; Kapamilya Channel

== Episodes ==
=== Season 1 ===
No. overall	No. in season	Title	Original release date	Kantar Media Ratings (nationwide)
1	1	"The Wongs"	February 10, 2020	14.2%
2	2	"Desisyon"	February 11, 2020	12.5%
3	3	"Tadhana"	February 12, 2020	11.7%
4	4	"Sumpa"	February 13, 2020	12.0%
5	5	"Kasal"	February 14, 2020	12.7%
6	6	"Pagdamay"	February 17, 2020	13.1%
7	7	"Kidnap"	February 18, 2020	11.7%
8	8	"Pagluha"	February 19, 2020	11.6%
9	9	"Promotion"	February 20, 2020	12.1%
10	10	"Itakwil"	February 21, 2020	11.1%
11	11	"Paglayo"	February 24, 2020	13.5%
12	12	"Gising ni Dana"	February 25, 2020	12.6%
13	13	"Bagong Buhay"	February 26, 2020	12.1%
14	14	"Hinala"	February 27, 2020	13.4%
15	15	"Labanan"	February 28, 2020	12.4%
16	16	"Matatag"	March 2, 2020	13.2%
17	17	"Kapalit"	March 3, 2020	13.1%
18	18	"Kutob"	March 4, 2020	12.9%
19	19	"Pagbangon"	March 5, 2020	13.3%
20	20	"Harapan"	March 6, 2020	13.0%
21	21	"Takot"	March 9, 2020	12.3%
22	22	"Plano"	March 10, 2020	14.0%
23	23	"Magpanggap"	March 11, 2020	14.0%
24	24	"Banggaan"	March 12, 2020	14.1%
25	25	"Paghaharap"	March 13, 2020	14.4%
26	26	"Family Meeting"	March 16, 2020	N/A
27	27	"Amanda"	March 17, 2020	N/A
28	28	"Tapatan"	March 18, 2020	N/A
29	29	"Loyal"	March 19, 2020	N/A
30	30	"Konsensya"	March 20, 2020	N/A
31	31	"Pagbabalik"	June 15, 2020 (Note: The episode was originally scheduled to air on March 23, 2020, but due to the shutdown of production because of enhanced community quarantine in Luzon.)	N/A
32	32	"Denial"	June 16, 2020	N/A
33	33	"Resulta"	June 17, 2020	N/A
34	34	"Katanungan"	June 18, 2020	N/A
35	35	"Paghihinala"	June 19, 2020	N/A
36	36	"Sabotahe"	June 22, 2020	N/A
37	37	"Pagasa"	June 23, 2020	N/A
38	38	"Patunayan"	June 24, 2020	N/A
39	39	"Takasan"	June 25, 2020	N/A
40	40	"Bistado"	June 26, 2020	N/A
41	41	"Katotohanan"	June 29, 2020	N/A
42	42	"Paghahanap"	June 30, 2020	N/A
43	43	"Lumayo"	July 1, 2020	N/A
44	44	"Paraan"	July 2, 2020	N/A
45	45	"Unahan"	July 3, 2020	N/A
46	46	"Anak"	July 6, 2020	N/A
47	47	"Ipaglaban"	July 7, 2020	N/A
48	48	"Karapatan"	July 8, 2020	N/A
49	49	"Trato"	July 9, 2020	N/A
50	50	"Kasuklaman"	July 10, 2020	N/A
51	51	"Hiwalayan"	July 13, 2020	N/A
52	52	"Pagsalba"	July 14, 2020	N/A
53	53	"Alipusta"	July 15, 2020	N/A
54	54	"Determinasyon"	July 16, 2020	N/A
55	55	"Manindigan"	July 17, 2020	N/A
56	56	"Brainwash"	July 20, 2020	N/A
57	57	"Siraan"	July 21, 2020	N/A
58	58	"Bawiin"	July 22, 2020	N/A
59	59	"Hiling"	July 23, 2020	N/A
60	60	"Suspetsa"	July 24, 2020	N/A
61	61	"Hanapin"	July 27, 2020	N/A
62	62	"Kampihan"	July 28, 2020	N/A
63	63	"Demanda"	July 29, 2020	N/A
64	64	"Adam Wong"	July 30, 2020	N/A
65	65	"Dalamhati"	July 31, 2020	N/A
66	66	"Pagsubok"	August 3, 2020	N/A
67	67	"Itago"	August 4, 2020	N/A
68	68	"Last Will"	August 5, 2020	N/A
69	69	"Agawin"	August 6, 2020	N/A
70	70	"Suspek"	August 7, 2020	N/A
71	71	"Ebidensya"	August 10, 2020	N/A
72	72	"Pangako"	August 11, 2020	N/A
73	73	"Hatol"	August 12, 2020	N/A
74	74	"Protektahan"	August 13, 2020	N/A
75	75	"Burahin"	August 14, 2020	N/A
76	76	"Makisama"	August 17, 2020	N/A
77	77	"Strategy"	August 18, 2020	N/A
78	78	"Panawagan"	August 19, 2020	N/A
79	79	"Naisahan"	August 20, 2020	N/A
80	80	"Pagkalat"	August 21, 2020	N/A
81	81	"Bentahan"	August 24, 2020	N/A
82	82	"Ligtas"	August 25, 2020	N/A
83	83	"Search Warrant"	August 26, 2020	N/A
84	84	"The New CEO"	August 27, 2020	N/A
85	85	"Malasakit"	August 28, 2020	N/A
86	86	"Announcement"	August 31, 2020	N/A
87	87	"Arestado"	September 1, 2020	N/A
88	88	"Testimonya"	September 2, 2020	N/A
89	89	"Motibo"	September 3, 2020	N/A
90	90	"Paglaya"	September 4, 2020	N/A
91	91	"Pananakot"	September 7, 2020	N/A
92	92	"Itakas"	September 8, 2020	N/A
93	93	"Pagsugod"	September 9, 2020	N/A
94	94	"David Chao"	September 10, 2020	N/A
95	95	"The Last Woman"	September 11, 2020	N/A
