= Love Thy Woman =

2020 Philippine television drama series

- Title card
- Genre: Romance; Melodrama
- Created by: Rondel P. Lindayag
- Written by: Arlene Tamayo; Jayson Mondragon
- Directed by: Jeffrey R. Jeturian; Jerry Lopez Sineneng; Andoy L. Ranay; Jojo A. Saguin
- Starring: Kim Chiu; Yam Concepcion; Xian Lim
- Opening theme: "Mahal Ko o Mahal Ako" by Regine Velasquez-Alcasid
- Composer: Edwin Marollano
- Country of origin: Philippines
- Original languages: Filipino; Standard Chinese; English
- No. of episodes: 95 (list of episodes)

Production
- Executive producers: Carlo L. Katigbak; Cory Vidanes; Laurenti M. Dyogi; Roldeo T. Endrinal
- Producers: Jovelyn Aberion; Jemila Jimenez; Carlina Dela Merced
- Production locations: Metro Manila, Philippines; Singapore
- Editors: Alan Pimentel; Godwin Lucena; Zara Terrado-Vidallo; Ronald Aguila; Marcel Piñol
- Running time: 30 minutes
- Production company: Dreamscape Entertainment

Original release
- Network: ABS-CBN (2020); Kapamilya Channel (2020)
- Release: February 10 – September 11, 2020

Love Thy Woman is a 2020 Philippine television drama romance series broadcast by ABS-CBN and Kapamilya Channel. Directed by Jeffrey R. Jeturian, Jerry Lopez Sineneng, Andoy L. Ranay and Jojo A. Saguin, it stars Kim Chiu, Yam Concepcion and Xian Lim. It aired on the network's Kapamilya Gold line up and worldwide on TFC from February 10 to September 11, 2020.

The series is streaming online on YouTube.

== Premise ==
Jia Wong and Dana Wong are half-sisters and daughters of Chinese Filipino self-made billionaire Adam Wong with two different women. Jia's mother is Kai Estrella, Adam's mistress, and Dana's mother is Lucy Gongsu-Wong, Adam's legal wife. The Wong daughters are beautiful, charming and intelligent, groomed to lead and head Dragon Empire Builders, a multi-million peso real estate business established by Adam.

Adam acknowledges his relationship with Kai and his daughter Jia, who form part of the Wong immediate family, attending all family and social events. Adam's wife, Lucy, is not happy about this but swallows her resentment and accepts their constant presence in their lives.

Lucy comes from a wealthy Singaporean family, her Filipino mother was one of her father's wives. Her mother leaves and Lucy is raised by her Chinese Singaporean father who hates and mistrusts those of Filipino descent. So when Lucy falls in love with Adam, her father disowns and curses her. Lucy never sees her family again. After Adam's indiscretion with Kai, Lucy sees it as the unravelling of her father's curse. Forced to accept her husband's mistress, the two families coexist under Adam's care. Because Adam is a prominent businessman, society accepts Kai as Adam's consort with a place in the social structure.

Jia is an interior designer who remained in Manila for her studies, working at her father's company. Dana finished her degree in architecture in Singapore where she meets and falls in love with David Chao.

Dana becomes pregnant with David and the couple plans to marry. As part of a pre-wedding ritual, the families have the couple's fortune read. The seer warns them of the curse and urges them to stop the wedding. Despite Lucy's apprehensions, Adam does not believe in the curse and the wedding follows. The "Wedding of the Year" that begins like a fairy tale, ends in a tragic car accident, leaving Dana in a deep coma. Medical experts from different countries step in with modern treatments but nobody can induce Dana out of her comatose state. The Wongs and the Chaos watch over Dana for over a year. Lucy believes that the curse is at work.

It was during this emotional time that Jia and David's shared grief of possibly losing Dana, blossoms into an illicit affair which results in chaos within the family. Harsh condemnation by Adam and Lucy and Jia's regret over betraying her older sister, drive Kai and Jia to leave the Wong family to start a new life on their own in Singapore. Jia discovers she is pregnant with David's son and finds success as a furniture designer, opening a furniture store with her boss, Richie Tan. But despite her success, the curse follows her as she suffers from breast cancer and loses her son.

Meanwhile, in Manila, Dana comes out of her coma. As she recovers, she is curious about what happened during the 18 months she was asleep. No one can give her a straight answer on why Jia and Kai left. Not believing that her father banished Jia for venturing out on her own, Dana becomes suspicious of David having an affair and that Jia's disappearance is related to David's emotional distance.

While David tries to make up for his indiscretion by sticking to their marriage, Dana's obsession to get the truth drives her to maltreat David. He considers filing for an annulment. Adam and Lucy are happy about this because they have not forgiven David for his betrayal of Dana.

Amidst the turmoil in their marriage, it is revealed that Jia's son did not die. Kai's brother Harry kidnapped the baby and was given to Lucy in exchange for money for Jia's cancer treatment. Unbeknownst to everyone except Lucy, the infant is left at the gate of the Wong residence and adopted by David and Dana.

In Singapore, Jia recovers from her illness and together with Richie, opens RJ&E Design, a furniture design and manufacturing company that becomes the most sought out furniture maker in Asia.

In Manila, Dana is in line to become the next CEO of Dragon Empire Builders once Adam announces his retirement. Motivated to expand and increase their sales as VP of Operations, Dana is set on a brand alliance with RJ&E Design. After several attempts for a meeting to submit a proposal, Lucy and Dana fly to Singapore and discover that Jia is the owner. Jia turns down their proposal. After advising Adam of their unsuccessful proposal, Adam makes some inquiries of his own and discovers Jia is the owner. He flies to Singapore and they have a happy reunion. Flushed with emotions after being separated for a decade, he convinces Jia to return to Manila with the promise to protect her from Lucy and Dana. Jia admits her indiscretion to Dana, hoping to be free of the curse.

From keeping Chinese traditions and Filipino values alive to adapt with the changing times, Love Thy Woman, a family saga spanning two generations, explores love's dark side and the duplicitous polarity of betrayal. A family's journey to heal the mistakes and wounds of the past.

== Cast and characters ==
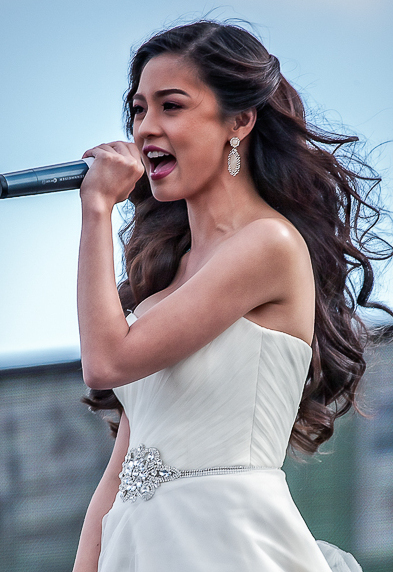
Kim Chiu portrays Jia Wong

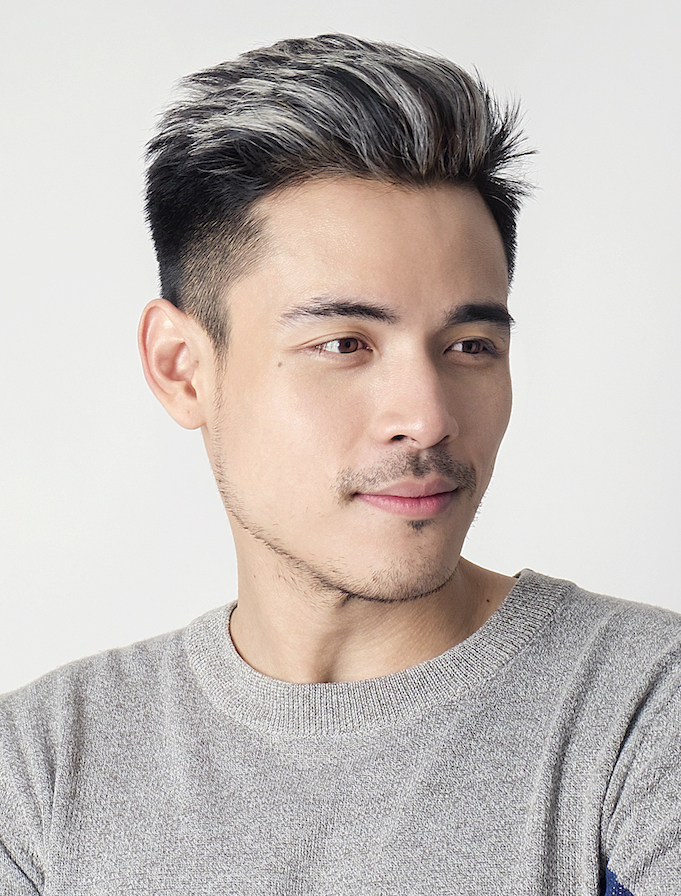
Xian Lim portrays David Chao

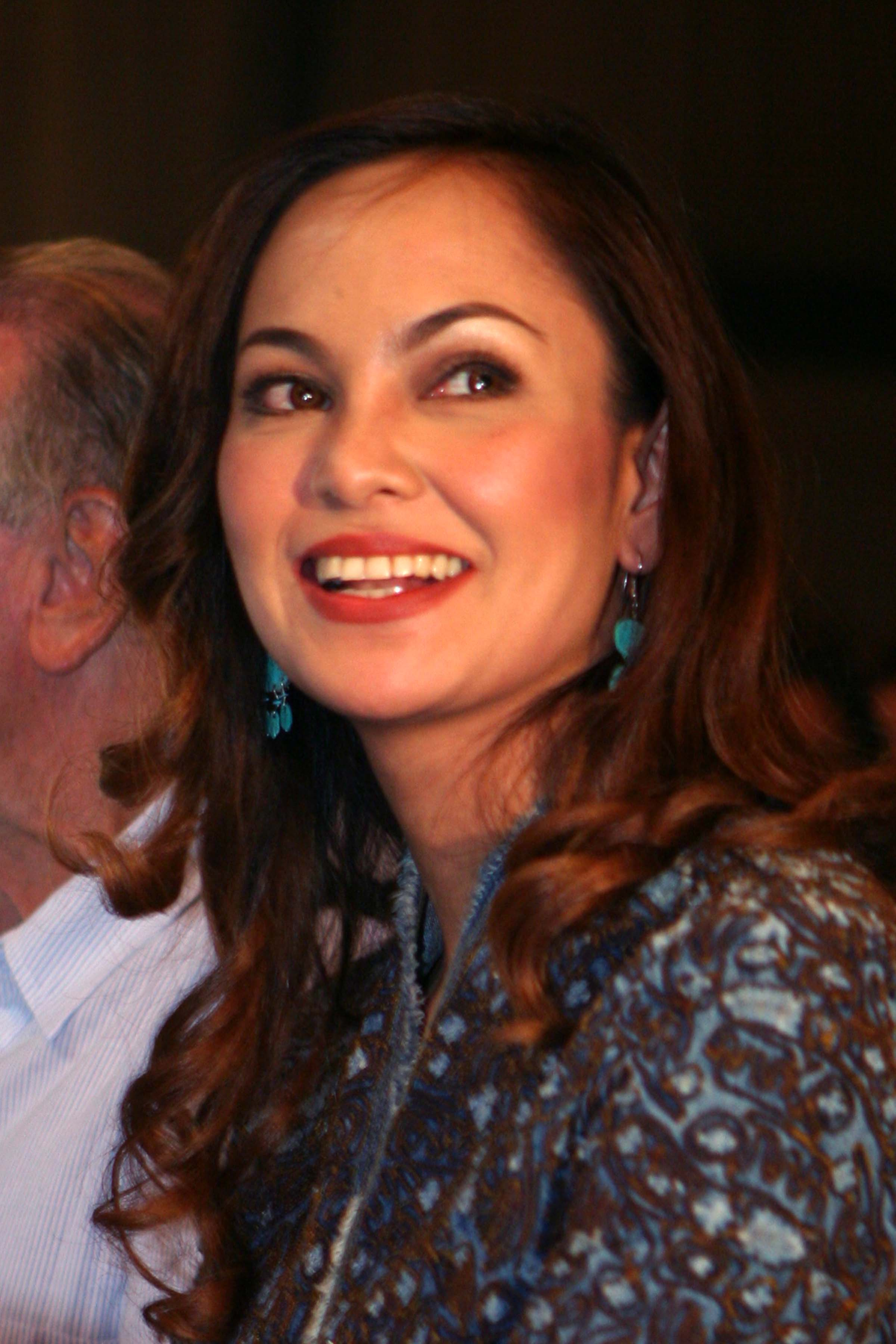
Eula Valdez portrays Lucy Wong

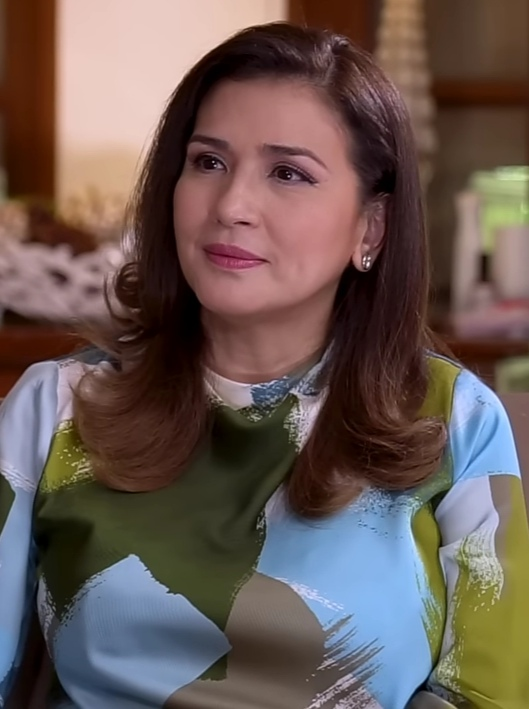
Zsa Zsa Padilla portrays Helen Chao

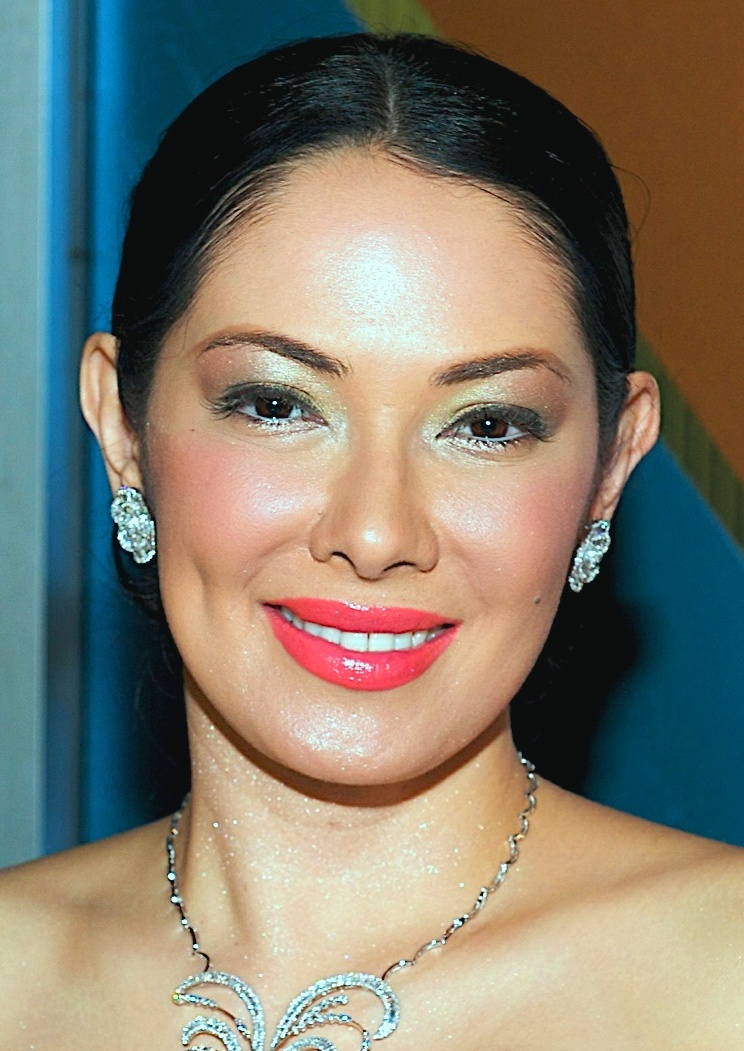
Ruffa Gutierrez portrays Amanda del Mundo

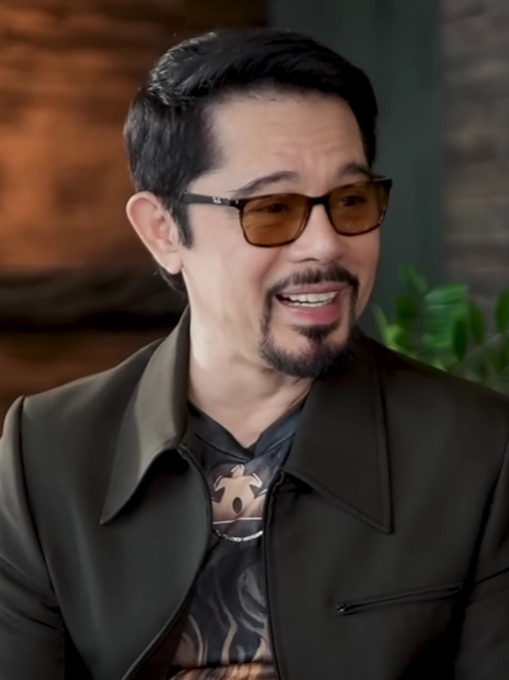
Christopher de Leon portrays Adam Wong

Main cast

- Kim Chiu as Jia E. Wong
- Yam Concepcion as Dana G. Wong-Chao
- Xian Lim as David Chao

Supporting cast

- Eula Valdez as Lucy Gongsu-Wong
- Sunshine Cruz as Rebecca "Kai" Estrella
- Zsa Zsa Padilla as Helen Chao
- Ruffa Gutierrez as Amanda del Mundo
- Christopher de Leon as Adam Wong

Recurring cast

- David Chua as Harold "Harry" Estrella
- Jennifer Sevilla as Carol Teng
- Mari Kaimo as Manny Tanchangco
- Janna Victoria as Donna Lee
- Tim Yap as Timothy "Tim" Go
- Tart Carlos as Cindy Ong
- Karl Gabriel as Gabriel "Gab" del Mundo
- Turs Daza as Patrick Matienzo
- Aurora Yumul as Kong Lin
- Olive Isidro as Shelia "Shelly" Ramos
- Shido Roxas as Jacob "Jimmy" Tanchangco
- Chienna Filomeno as Tiffany Go
- Marina Benipayo as Alicia Chua
- Lloyd Samartino as Eric Chua
- Bryan Santos as Jefferson Chua
- Richard Juan as Richard "Richie" Tan
- MJ Cayabyab as Summer Dy
- Tori Garcia as Abigail Tanchangco
- Mikee Agustin as Rosslyn "Ross" Flores
- JC Gamez as Eddie Reyes
- China Yoo as Everly Soo
- Kimberly Tan as Ellie Reyes
- Abi Kassem as Olive Chan
- JJ Quilantang as Michael W. Chao / Jianyu W. Chao
- Dominic Ochoa as Simon Cruz
- Diana Mackey as Sophie Matienzo
- Ding Dimaunahan as Macario Yalung

Guest cast

- Joonee Gamboa as Zheng Gongsu

== Production ==
=== Casting ===
Erich Gonzales was originally cast to play the role of Dana Wong, but she backed out because of creative differences. Yam Concepcion took over the role.

== Broadcast ==
=== Scheduling ===
The series aired on ABS-CBN's Kapamilya Gold afternoon block and worldwide on The Filipino Channel.

Due to the community quarantine being imposed in the country as a response to the COVID-19 pandemic in the Philippines, the series temporarily stopped filming new episodes in compliance with the guidelines set by the country's government. Despite this, the series aired 5 of its fresh, new episodes from March 16–20, 2020, along with Sandugo's finale week.

However, as the series ran out of pre-taped episodes during the said health crisis, it temporarily stopped airing the week after and its timeslot was temporarily taken over by reruns of Walang Hanggan, The Legal Wife, and Got to Believe on March 23, 2020.

Prior to the series being put on hiatus, series star Christopher de Leon tested positive for COVID-19. This caused select members of the cast to place themselves in self-quarantine.

Thereafter, the series' future would be placed in doubt after the shutdown of ABS-CBN's analog free-to-air stations following the cease and desist order issued by the National Telecommunications Commission on account of its franchise expiration. However, on June 4, 2020, it was announced that the show would make its return on June 15, 2020, on cable-and-satellite channel Kapamilya Channel.

=== Re-runs ===
The series began airing re-runs on Kapamilya Channel's Kapamilya Gold afternoon block, Kapamilya Online Live, and A2Z's Zuper Hapon from November 15, 2021, to March 25, 2022, replacing the re-runs of Dolce Amore and was replaced by the re-runs of Init sa Magdamag. It began airing re-runs on Jeepney TV from October 23, 2022, to April 2, 2023, replacing the re-runs of Budoy and was replaced by the re-runs of He's Into Her (season 1). It aired on both Jeepney TV and ALLTV from September 30, 2024, to February 7, 2025, replacing the re-runs of Tubig at Langis and was replaced by the re-runs of A Beautiful Affair.

== Ratings ==
Kantar Media National TV Ratings (2:30PM PST)
Pilot Episode	Finale Episode	Peak	Average
14.2% February 10, 2020	N/A; September 11, 2020	N/A	N/A

- This program airs nationally on a cable channel/pay TV which normally has a relatively smaller audience compared to free-to-air TV/public broadcasters (GMA, TV5, and PTV among others).

== Adaptation ==
An Indonesian adaptation titled Belenggu Dua Hati (transl. Shackles of Two Hearts) was produced by Tripar Multi Vision Plus and was aired on ANTV for 59 episodes from August 6, 2020, to October 4, 2020.
