= Since I Found You (TV series) =

- Title card
- Genre: Romance; Drama; Comedy
- Created by: ABS-CBN Studios; Reggie Amigo; Rondel P. Lindayag
- Developed by: ABS-CBN Studios
- Written by: Benedict Mique Jr.; Abi Lam-Parayno; Jayson Arvene Mondrago; Allan Cuadra; John Anthony Rodulfo; Marc Ferdinand Castañeda
- Directed by: Antoinette H. Jadaone; Andoy L. Ranay; Darnel Joy R. Villaflor
- Starring: Piolo Pascual; Arci Muñoz; JC de Vera; Alessandra de Rossi; Empoy Marquez
- Theme music composer: Russell Hitchcock; Graham Russell
- Opening theme: "Even the Nights Are Better" by Kyla
- Country of origin: Philippines
- Original language: Filipino
- No. of episodes: 85

Production
- Executive producers: Carlo L. Katigbak; Cory V. Vidanes; Laurenti Dyogi; Roldeo T. Endrinal
- Producers: Carlina D. dela Merced; Ethel Manaloto Espiritu; Mae N. Santos
- Cinematography: Herman Claravall
- Editor: Rommel Malimban
- Running time: 30–45 minutes
- Production company: Dreamscape Entertainment Television

Original release
- Network: ABS-CBN
- Release: April 16 – August 10, 2018

Related
- The Good Son; Halik; Love Thy Woman

Since I Found You is a 2018 Philippine television drama series broadcast by ABS-CBN. Directed by Antoinette H. Jadaone, Andoy L. Ranay and Darnel Joy R. Villaflor, it stars Piolo Pascual, Arci Muñoz, JC de Vera, Alessandra de Rossi and Empoy. It aired on the network's Primetime Bida line up and worldwide on TFC from April 16 to August 10, 2018, replacing The Good Son and was replaced by Halik.

== Premise ==
Nathan Capistrano (Piolo Pascual) is the 40-year-old CEO of Golden Builders, Inc. He is a straight shooter who goes after what he wants no matter the cost or the obstacles, and accepts no excuse from anybody – not even his loved ones.

Having grown up in poverty without outside support, Nathan built his wealth through determination alone. Despite his success, he struggles with the isolation that accompanies it.

This is when he meets Dani Cobarrubias (Arci Muñoz), a spunky and outspoken 20-something who Nathan eventually views as a kindred spirit. He allows himself to fall in love with her, and everything seems to be perfect between them.

== Cast and characters ==
=== Main cast ===
- Piolo Pascual as Nathaniel "Nathan" Capistrano
- Arci Muñoz as Daniella "Dani" Cobarrubias-Capistrano
- Alessandra de Rossi as Janice Punzalan
- JC de Vera as John "Gino" Corpuz
- Empoy Marquez as James Ribs

=== Supporting cast ===
- Michael de Mesa as Gary Corpuz
- Carmi Martin as Regina "Mama Reg" Cobarrubias
- Joey Marquez as Gregorio "Mang Gerry" Punzalan
- John Lapus as Kap. Ronwaldo "Watashi" Cobarrubias
- Isabel Oli-Prats as Alliya "Iya" Capistrano-Samontina
- Cholo Barretto as Justin Capistrano
- Kate Alejandrino as Lexie Capistrano
- Vivoree Esclito as AJ Punzalan
- Moi Marcampo as Morisette
- Benj Manalo as Hector
- Joel Saracho as Berto

=== Guest cast ===
- Jong Cuenco as Irwin
- Ces Quesada as Linda
- Chrome Cosio as Darwin Samontina
- Ashley Sarmiento as Princess
- Yñigo Delen as Kyle
- CK Kieron as Kiefer
- Gee Canlas as Racquel
- Miho Nishida as Maggie
- Rhed Bustamante as Gelai
- Justine Peña as Moymoy
- JV Kapunan as Simon
- Josef Elizalde as Jeff
- Adrienne Vergara as Aida
- Des Ngo as Lorna
- Phi Palmos as Yellow
- Max Celada as Bong
- Dolly de Leon as Dr. Yambao
- Lao Rodriguez as Engr. Landicho
- Dwaine Woolley as Cole
- Kyla as herself
- Angelo Acosta as Adrian

=== Special participation ===
- Charo Santos-Concio as Elvira "Elvie" Capistrano
- Iza Calzado as Pam
- Irma Adlawan as Tyang

== Reception ==
Kantar Media National TV Ratings (9:15PM PST)
Pilot Episode	Finale Episode	Peak	Average
22.1% April 16, 2018	19.6% August 10, 2018	24.5% April 17, 2018	TBD

== Re-runs ==
The show aired re-runs on Jeepney TV from June 15 to November 2, 2019 (replacing the re-runs of La Luna Sangre); February 1 to April 2, 2021 (replacing the re-runs of Mula sa Puso 2011); March 20 to July 14, 2023 (replacing the re-runs of Kahit Puso'y Masugatan); and November 9, 2026 to March 5, 2027 (replacing the re-runs of Bukas na Lang Kita Mamahalin).

== See also ==
- List of programs broadcast by ABS-CBN
- List of programs broadcast by Jeepney TV
- List of ABS-CBN Studios original drama series
