= List of Init sa Magdamag episodes =

Init sa Magdamag (International title: When Love Burns / (transl. Heat at Overnight) is a Philippine television drama broadcast by Kapamilya Channel, A2Z and TV5. It aired from April 19, 2021 to September 10, 2021 on the channel's Primetime Bida evening block, Jeepney TV, A2Z Primetime, TV5's TodoMax Primetime Singko and worldwide via The Filipino Channel, replacing Walang Hanggang Paalam.

== Series overview ==
Season	Episodes	Originally released	
Season	Episodes	First released	Last released
1	105	April 19, 2021	September 10, 2021

- Season 2: 7/5/2021-7/23/2021
- Season 3: 7/26/2021-8/20/2021
- Season 4: 8/23/2021-9/10/2021
- iWantTFC shows two episodes first in advance before its television broadcast.

== Episodes ==
=== Season 1 ===
No. overall	No. in season	Title	Original release date	AGB Nielsen Ratings (NUTAM People)
1	1	"Init ng Unang Gabi"	April 19, 2021	5.8%
2	2	"Init ng Unang Tingin"	April 20, 2021	4.8%
3	3	"Mainit na Sorry"	April 21, 2021	4.9%
4	4	"Mainit na Hinala"	April 22, 2021	5.6%
5	5	"Init ng Unang Halik"	April 23, 2021	N/A
6	6	"Init ng Choices"	April 26, 2021	3.8%
7	7	"Init ng Pait"	April 27, 2021	5.3%
8	8	"Init ng Marriage"	April 28, 2021	N/A
9	9	"Init ng Banggaan"	April 29, 2021	5.0%
10	10	"Init ng Pulitika"	April 30, 2021	4.8%
11	11	"Mainit na Marital Problems"	May 3, 2021	N/A
12	12	"Init ng Unang Basagan"	May 4, 2021	N/A
13	13	"Mainit na Desisyon"	May 5, 2021	4.5%
14	14	"Init ng Past at Present"	May 6, 2021	3.8%
15	15	"Init ni Tupe"	May 7, 2021	3.5%
16	16	"Init ng Past"	May 10, 2021	4.6%
17	17	"Mainit na Pagsasama"	May 11, 2021	4.4%
18	18	"Init ng Sigaw ng Puso"	May 12, 2021	4.5%
19	19	"Pili sa Init at Lamig"	May 13, 2021	4.6%
20	20	"Mainit na Struggle"	May 14, 2021	4.6%
21	21	"Init ng Praning"	May 17, 2021	4.7%
22	22	"Init ng Lasing"	May 18, 2021	N/A
23	23	"Mainit na Trip"	May 19, 2021	4.4%
24	24	"Init ng Donor"	May 20, 2021	N/A
25	25	"Starting Init Again"	May 21, 2021	3.9%
26	26	"Runaway Wife"	May 24, 2021	5.0%
27	27	"Finding Rita"	May 25, 2021	5.1%
28	28	"Anakan Mo ang Asawa Ko"	May 26, 2021	4.6%
29	29	"Toxic Init"	May 27, 2021	N/A
30	30	"Yes to Init"	May 28, 2021	N/A
31	31	"Sperm Donor"	May 31, 2021	4.4%
32	32	"Face Off"	June 1, 2021	4.6%
33	33	"Ex Reveal"	June 2, 2021	4.3%
34	34	"Past and Present"	June 3, 2021	4.4%
35	35	"Love Child"	June 4, 2021	4.1%
36	36	"Init ng Pitik"	June 7, 2021	4.4%
37	37	"Burning Lies"	June 8, 2021	4.0%
38	38	"Deadly Plans"	June 9, 2021	3.8%
39	39	"Hot Preggers"	June 10, 2021	3.6%
40	40	"Insecurities"	June 11, 2021	3.9%
41	41	"Gut Feels sa Init"	June 14, 2021	4.4%
42	42	"Init of Pregnancy"	June 15, 2021	N/A
43	43	"Init Cravings"	June 16, 2021	4.4%
44	44	"Dudang Duda"	June 17, 2021	N/A
45	45	"Hulihan"	June 18, 2021	N/A
46	46	"Duda"	June 21, 2021	4.5%
47	47	"Para-paraan"	June 22, 2021	4.4%
48	48	"Scheme"	June 23, 2021	N/A
49	49	"Two Faced"	June 24, 2021	4.3%
50	50	"The Good Doctor"	June 25, 2021	4.2%
51	51	"Betrayed Wife"	June 28, 2021	4.1%
52	52	"Fed Up"	June 29, 2021	N/A
53	53	"Family Feud"	June 30, 2021	4.1%
54	54	"Clash"	July 1, 2021	N/A
55	55	"Cover Up"	July 2, 2021	4.6%
56	56	"Fight For Justice"	July 5, 2021	3.8%
57	57	"Rage"	July 6, 2021	4.3%
58	58	"Downward Spiral"	July 7, 2021	4.8%
59	59	"Begin Again"	July 8, 2021	4.2%
60	60	"Rage"	July 9, 2021	4.2%
61	61	"Burning Paranoia"	July 12, 2021	4.5%
62	62	"The Battered Wife"	July 13, 2021	4.3%
63	63	"The Awakening"	July 14, 2021	N/A
64	64	"Ayawan Na"	July 15, 2021	6.2%
65	65	"Love Scars"	July 16, 2021	N/A
66	66	"Regrets"	July 19, 2021	4.6%
67	67	"Trauma"	July 20, 2021	4.7%
68	68	"Good Riddance"	July 21, 2021	3.9%
69	69	"Pinaglayo, Pinagtagpo"	July 22, 2021	4.3%
70	70	"Labor Day"	July 23, 2021	4.1%
71	71	"Baby Andrew"	July 26, 2021	4.4%
72	72	"Dalawang Ama"	July 27, 2021	3.9%
73	73	"Hallucinations"	July 28, 2021	N/A
74	74	"Recall"	July 29, 2021	5.0%
75	75	"Rightful Father"	July 30, 2021	4.8%
76	76	"Crime of Passion"	August 2, 2021	4.2%
77	77	"Hunch"	August 3, 2021	4.4%
78	78	"Battle of the Exes"	August 4, 2021	N/A
79	79	"Mother's Love"	August 5, 2021	4.7%
80	80	"Insecurity"	August 6, 2021	4.3%
81	81	"Bantay Salakay"	August 9, 2021	4.2%
82	82	"Stalker"	August 10, 2021	5.4%
83	83	"Bantay Sarado"	August 11, 2021	4.5%
84	84	"Binyagan"	August 12, 2021	4.1%
85	85	"Wounded"	August 13, 2021	4.5%
86	86	"Evidence"	August 16, 2021	5.0%
87	87	"DNA Test"	August 17, 2021	4.4%
88	88	"Guilty"	August 18, 2021	N/A
89	89	"Escape Plan"	August 19, 2021	4.0%
90	90	"Shady"	August 20, 2021	4.5%
91	91	"Busted"	August 23, 2021	N/A
92	92	"Huli Cam"	August 24, 2021	N/A
93	93	"Crazy Love"	August 25, 2021	N/A
94	94	"Deadly Yes"	August 26, 2021	N/A
95	95	"Target to Kill"	August 27, 2021	N/A
96	96	"Truth Unravelled"	August 30, 2021	N/A
97	97	"Prisoner of Love"	August 31, 2021	N/A
98	98	"Goodbyes"	September 1, 2021	N/A
99	99	"Love and Lies"	September 2, 2021	N/A
100	100	"Closer To Truth"	September 3, 2021	N/A
101	101	"Burning Proof"	September 6, 2021	N/A
102	102	"Desperado"	September 7, 2021	N/A
103	103	"The Final Chase"	September 8, 2021	N/A
104	104	"The Final Init"	September 9, 2021	N/A
105	105	"The Final Blow"	September 10, 2021	N/A

- This program airs nationally on a cable channel/pay TV which normally has a relatively smaller audience compared to free-to-air TV/public broadcasters (GMA, TV5, and PTV among others).
