= Init sa Magdamag (TV series) =

2021 Philippine television drama series

- Also known as: When Love Burns
- Genre: Melodrama; Romance; Revenge
- Created by: Henry King Quitain; Jay Fernando
- Written by: Generiza Reyes Francisco; Maan Dimaculangan-Fampulme; Mary Pearl Urtola
- Directed by: Ian D. Loreños; Raymund B. Ocampo
- Starring: Gerald Anderson; Yam Concepcion; JM de Guzman
- Music by: Jessie Lasaten
- Opening theme: "Init sa Magdamag" by Jona
- Composers: Willy Cruz; Jonathan Manalo
- Country of origin: Philippines
- Original languages: Filipino; English
- No. of seasons: 1
- No. of episodes: 105 (list of episodes)

Production
- Executive producers: Carlo L. Katigbak; Cory V. Vidanes; Laurenti M. Dyogi; Ruel S. Bayani
- Producers: Des de Guzman; Henry King Quitain; Jay Fernando; Sackey Prince Pendatun
- Production locations: Metro Manila, Philippines; Makati, Philippines; Rizal, Philippines
- Editor: Kathryn Jerry Perez
- Running time: 30 minutes
- Production company: Star Creatives

Original release
- Network: Kapamilya Channel (Note: The series is also broadcast on Cine Mo!, Jeepney TV and TFC, and through a block-time agreement with TV5 and A2Z. It is also available on-demand via iWantTFC.)
- Release: April 19 – September 10, 2021

Init sa Magdamag (International title: When Love Burns / transl. Heat at Overnight) is a Philippine television drama romance series broadcast by Kapamilya Channel. Directed by Raymund B. Ocampo and Ian D. Loreños, it stars Gerald Anderson, Yam Concepcion and JM de Guzman. It premiered on the network's Primetime Bida line up on April 19, 2021. The series concluded on September 10, 2021, with a total of 105 episodes.

== Plot ==
The story revolves around Tupe, Rita, and Peterson — and their love triangle marred with political drama and clashing dreams.

An aspiring doctor, Tupe gets falsely accused as being involved in the corrupt activities of his government official associated father, wrecking his relationship with Rita. Years after Tupe's apparent disappearance, Rita finds a new love in Peterson, who credits her for becoming a changed man as he pursues political office.

Rita and Peterson's relationship began to deteriorate after Peterson was rendered impotent due to a car accident. Believing that having a child will revive their failing marriage, Rita and Peterson decided to hire a sperm donor — in the form of Tupe, who is now a resident barrio doctor. Unbeknownst to Peterson, Tupe is Rita's greatest love. Complications will soon arise when Peterson unravels that truth behind Rita and Tupe's past, igniting his rage.

== Cast and characters ==
Cast

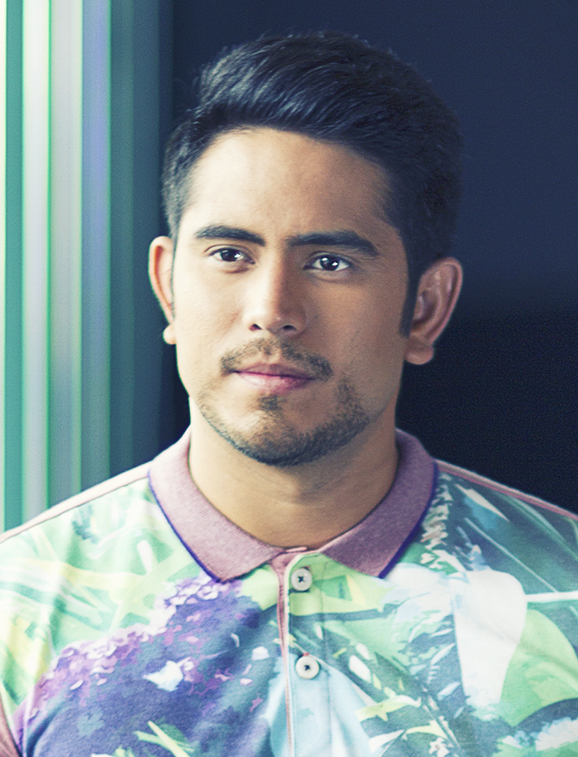
Gerald Anderson portrays Dr. Christopher "Tupe" Salcedo

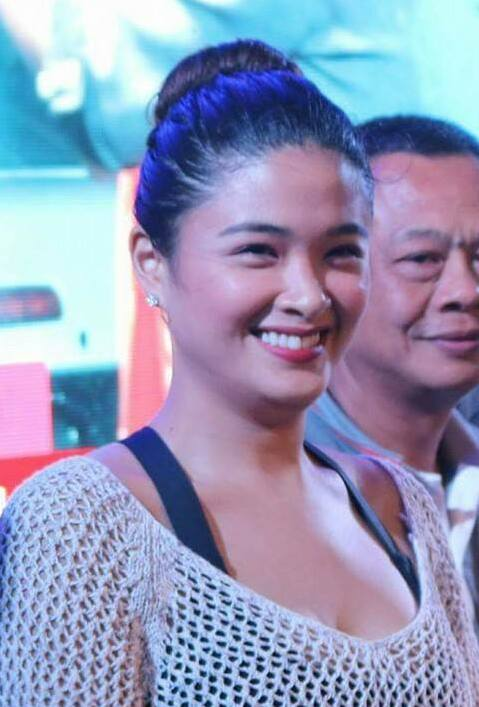
Yam Concepcion portrays Cong. Rita Macatangay-Alvarez / Rita Macatangay-Salcedo

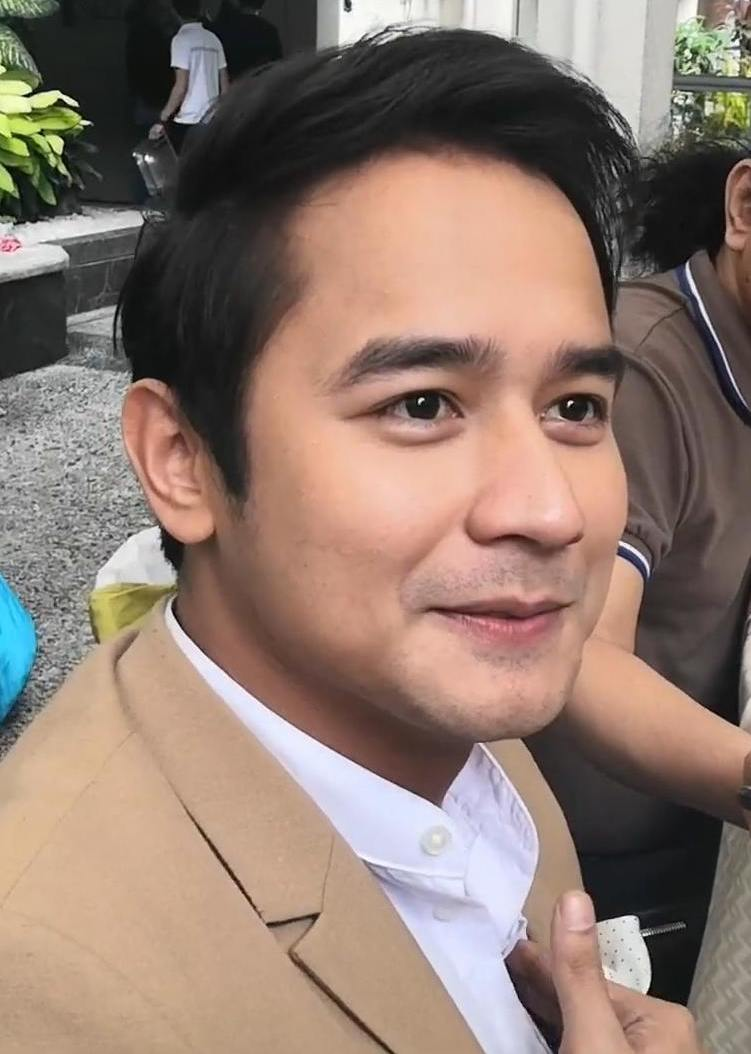
JM de Guzman portrays Peterson Alvarez

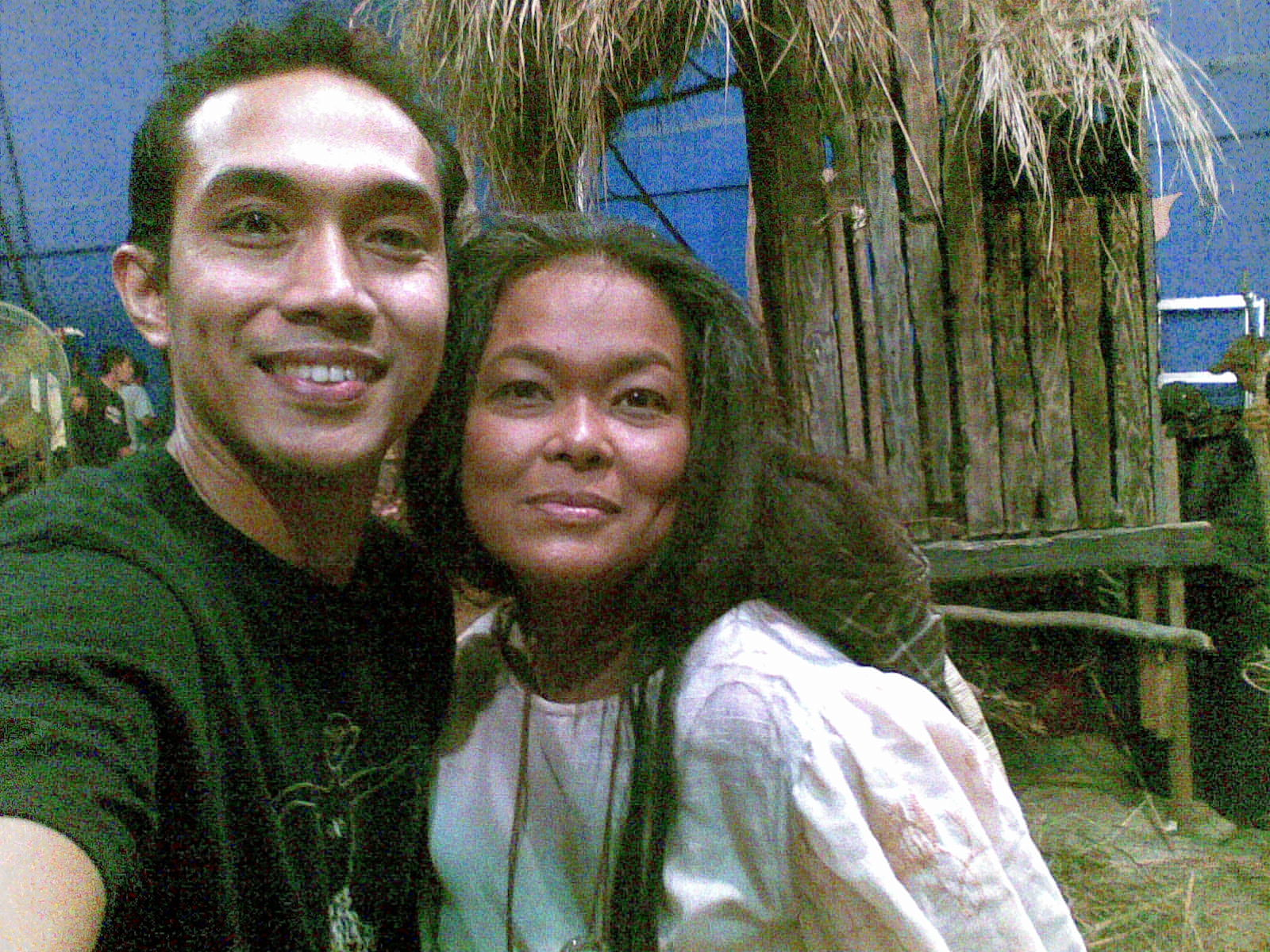
Tetchie Agbayani portrays Olivia Alvarez

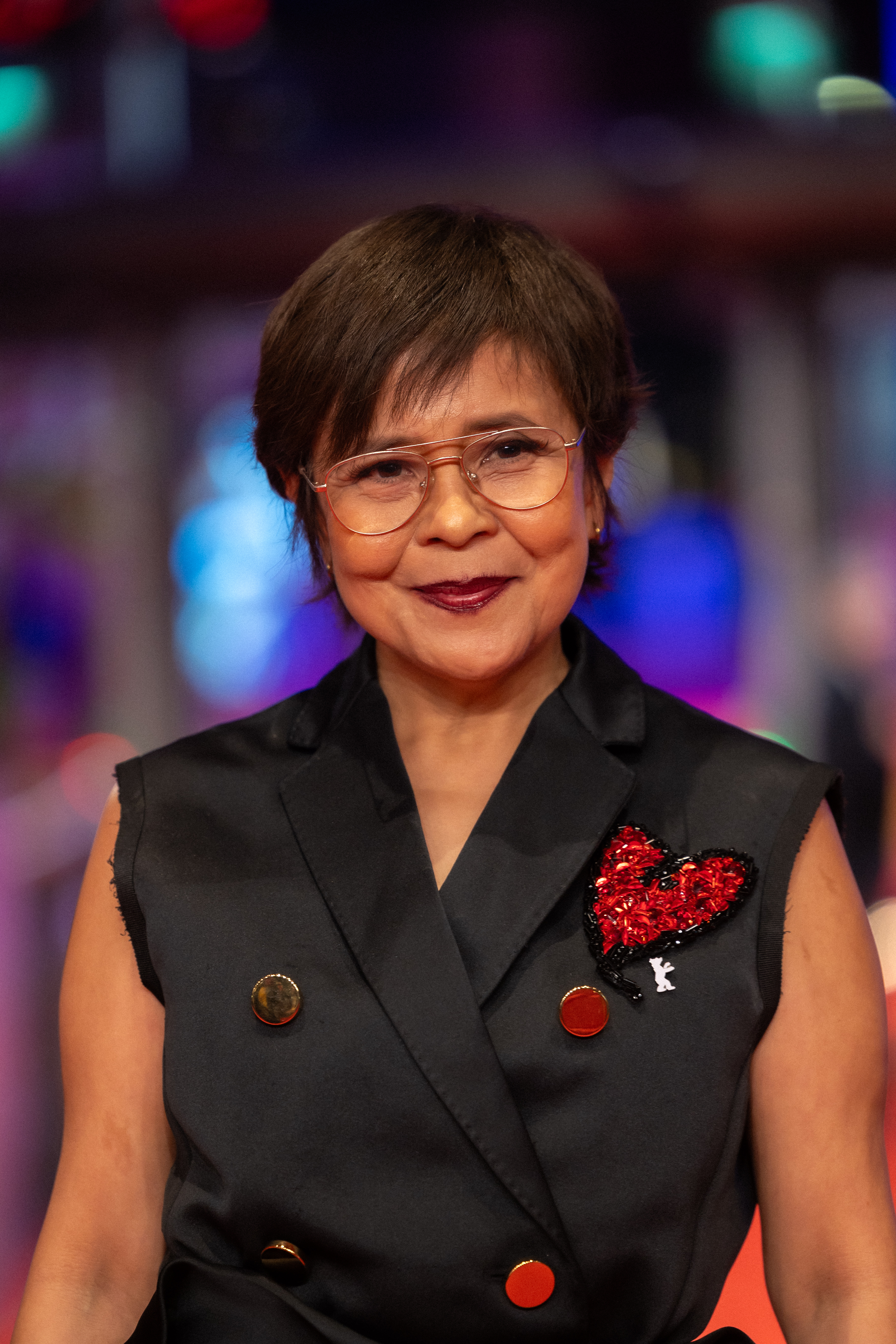
Dolly de Leon portrays Perla

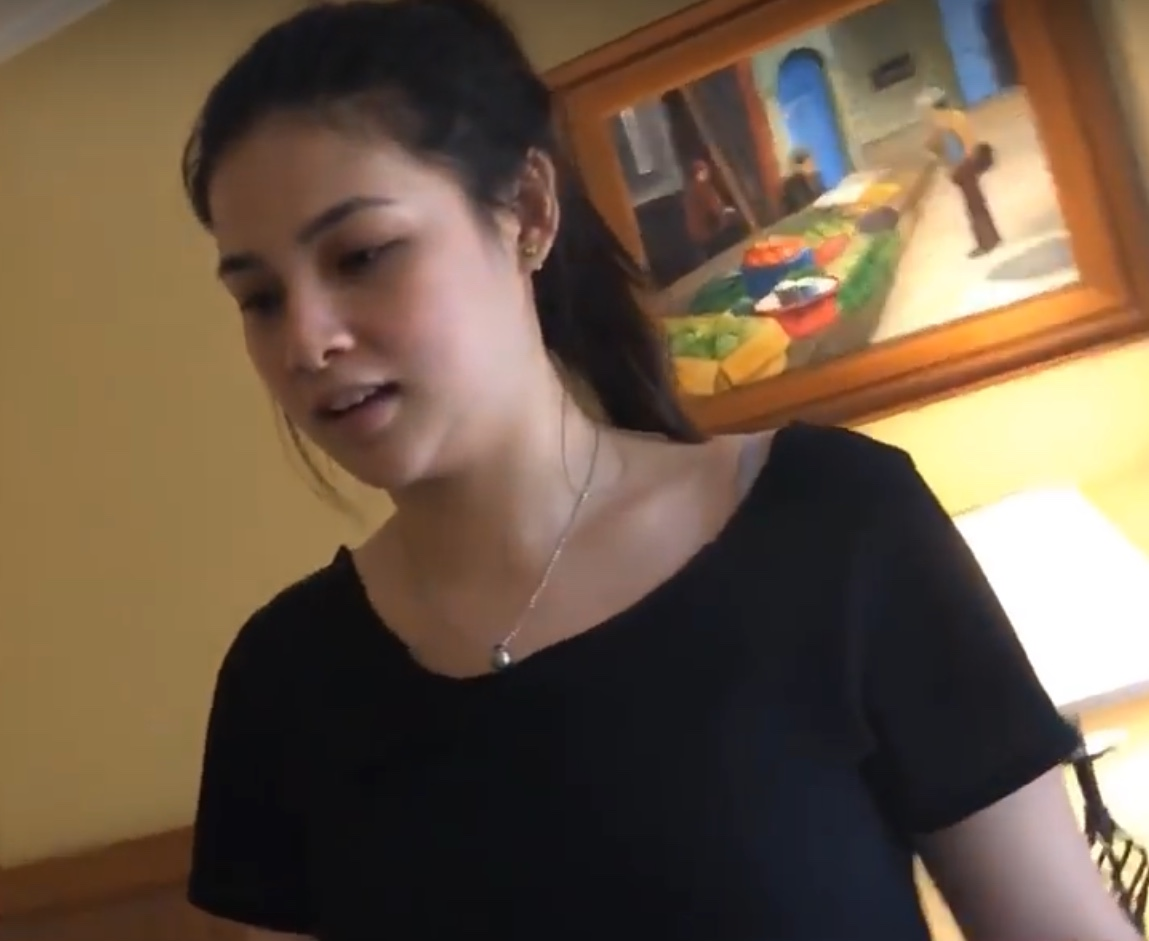
Maika Rivera portrays Sam

=== Main cast ===
- Gerald Anderson as Dr. Christopher "Tupe" Salcedo
- Yam Concepcion as Cong. Rita Macatangay-Alvarez / Rita Macatangay-Salcedo
- JM de Guzman as Peterson Alvarez

=== Supporting cast ===
- Tetchie Agbayani as Olivia Alvarez
- Rez Cortez as Victor Ruiz
- Aleck Bovick as Celia Macatangay
- Albie Casiño as Raymund
- Mica Javier as Paulina Vergara
- Alexa Ilacad as Hannah Salcedo
- Boom Labrusca as Labrador "Lab" Del Mundo
- Gab Lagman as Kiko Del Mundo
- Mark Oblea as Khyle Macatangay

=== Extended cast ===
- Dolly de Leon as Perla
- Angie Castrence as Manang Lily
- Lotlot Bustamante as Kapitana Apple
- Ayla Mendero as Limei
- Rafa Siguion-Reyna as Atty. Paolo
- Ali Khatibi as Cong. Regalado
- Hannah Ledesma as Melai
- Apey Obera as Michelle
- Benedict Campos as Bryan
- Brian Sy as Atty. Eli
- Lance Justin Carr as Jack
- Franco Daza as Kenneth
- Mabel Reyes as Fely
- Nico Gomez Alonso as Dr. Adrian
- Mark Rivera as Emman

=== Guest cast ===
- Joey Marquez as Engr. Miguel Salcedo
- Lovely Rivero as Helen Salcedo
- Maika Rivera as Sam

== Production ==
=== Casting ===
Maja Salvador was originally cast to play the titular role with the working title Ligaya back in 2018 but she turned down the role because of its infidelity-themed concept similar with her previous teleserye, The Legal Wife, and also out of consideration for her current boyfriend. Yam Concepcion took over the role.

== See also ==
- List of Kapamilya Channel original programming
- List of Kapamilya Online Live original programming
- List of A2Z (TV channel) original programming
- List of TV5 (Philippine TV network) original programming
- List of programs broadcast by ABS-CBN
- List of programs broadcast by Jeepney TV
- List of ABS-CBN Studios original drama series
