= Donnalyn Bartolome =

Filipino YouTuber, model, singer and influencer

- Born: Donnalyn Bartolome (Note: Donnalyn Bartolome was born in the Philippines. Thus, she does not possess her mother's maiden name, which is Jereos.)
- Other name: Donna
- Occupations: Singer; songwriter; rapper; model
- Years active: 2008–present
- Agent: Viva Artists Agency (2012–present)
- Partner: JM de Guzman (2024–present)

Donnalyn Bartolome is a Filipino singer-songwriter, rapper, model, vlogger, and actress.

== Personal life ==
Since May 2024, Bartolome has been in a relationship with JM de Guzman.

== Discography ==
=== Albums ===
- 2014: Kakaibabe
- 2015: Happy Break Up
- 2018: Surprise
- 2019: HBD'
- 2020: Social Media Goddess
- 2021: OMO (On My Own)
- 2022: Shawty

== Awards and honors ==
| Year | Award | Category | Notable works | Result | Ref. |
|---|---|---|---|---|---|
| 2014 | 28th PMPC Star Awards for TV | Best New Female TV Personality | SpinNation | Nominated | |
| 2014 | ASAP Pop Viewers Choice Awards | Pop YouTube Sensation | Kakaibabe | Won | |
| 2024 | Septimius Awards | Best Content Creator | Kakaibabe | Won | |
