= List of Pira-Pirasong Paraiso episodes =

Pira-Pirasong Paraiso is a Philippine drama television series broadcast by Kapamilya Channel. It aired on the network's Kapamilya Gold and Yes, Weekend! Saturday afternoon block from July 25, 2023 to January 27, 2024.

== Series overview ==
Season	Episodes	Originally released	
Season	Episodes	First released	Last released
1	47	July 25, 2023	September 16, 2023
2	66	September 18, 2023	December 2, 2023
3	48	December 4, 2023	January 27, 2024

== Episodes ==
=== Season 1 ===
No. overall	No. in season	Title	TV title	Original release date	AGB Nielsen Ratings (NUTAM People)
1	1	"The Family That Steals Together"	"Pagbubukas"	July 25, 2023	1.6%
Baby, an aspiring architect, works with her family of con artists to earn a living and provide for her mother's medical needs. Complications arise with some failures in their recent operations, one of which is in the home of the Lamadrids.
2	2	"The Bracelet"	"Huli"	July 26, 2023	1.6%
Baby leaves home to pursue her studies, but her plans are thwarted when she chances upon the Lamadrids once again. Compelled to seek her adoptive father Badong's help, Baby receives a revelation that surprises both her and Diana.
3	3	"The Con"	"Palabas"	July 27, 2023	1.7%
Urgently needing funds for Osang's worsening condition, Baby takes on one last job to pretend as Diana's long-lost sister Amy and steal from the wealthy Lamadrids. However, an eagle-eyed Julius decides to make sure that Baby is truly his wife's kin.
4	4	"Meet the Judge"	"Bulilyaso"	July 28, 2023	1.5%
Baby successfully steals the diamonds from the Lamadrids, but her much-awaited freedom gets thwarted once again when she bumps into Julius' first wife, Jacinda Sebastian. Much to Baby's trouble, her and Diana's DNA test result arrives unexpectedly.
5	5	"The Long Haul"	"Positive"	July 29, 2023	2.2%
Badong flies into a rage upon learning that Baby returned the diamonds in light of her and Diana's DNA test results. While the Abiogs' financial situation turns desperate, Baby's web of lies gets more tangled as she meets more people in Diana's life.
6	6	"Life of a Fake Princess"	"Pagkukunwari"	July 31, 2023	1.8%
Diana seizes the opportunity to make up for the lost time with Amy. Angela, a journalist with strong news sense, encounters Julius' son, Elon, as she grows determined to pursue a story about the Paraiso sisters.
7	7	"Hurdles of a Second Wife"	"Tanggol"	August 1, 2023	1.6%
Badong pressures Baby to save their family’s neck from their syndicate boss by taking what she can from Diana. After convincing her pretend sister to let her work in Lamadrid Land, Baby witnesses the tough situation Diana has to face in the company.
8	8	"Jacinda's Diamonds"	"Subukan"	August 2, 2023	1.9%
Baby’s skills come in handy when she falls victim to Roxanne and her friends’ mean schemes. Just as Xyrus uses Hilary to pressure Badong to pay his debt, Baby gets a glimpse of hope when she learns that Jacinda has not yet sold her diamonds.
9	9	"Secrets Left Untold"	"Siglap"	August 3, 2023	1.7%
Baby makes a careful plan to steal Jacinda's diamonds, while Diana recalls a glimpse of her dark past as she grows excited to celebrate Amy's birthday. Elsewhere, Angela persistently urges Elon to help her pursue the story of Diana and Amy’s reunion.
10	10	"The Heist"	"Hinala"	August 4, 2023	1.4%
Baby sets her plan to steal Jacinda's diamond in motion, only to rouse the judge's suspicions against her. Diana's act of kindness toward Osang stirs up Baby's guilt.
11	11	"The Interview"	"Sisi"	August 5, 2023	2.0%
Kano's attempt to steal a car goes awry when Jonaf catches him red-handed, until Hilary intervenes. Diana recalls her dark past as she finally agrees to sit down with Angela for an interview.
12	12	"Party Preparations"	"Kaarawan"	August 7, 2023	1.5%
Tension rises between Vlad and Julius over Diana's appointment as Lamadrid Land's new lead project manager. Kano cooks up a plan to attend Baby's birthday party when Badong forbids him and Hilary from going to the event.
13	13	"Father and Son"	"Sigalot"	August 8, 2023	1.4%
Baby becomes anxious upon discovering that Kano and Hilary infiltrated her birthday party. While she and Badong try to sort things out, a drunken Vlad gets into an altercation with Julius over a resentment that dates back to the past.
14	14	"A Night to Regret"	"Pag-intindi"	August 9, 2023	1.2%
Vlad confronts Diana about their past, prompting the latter to come clean to Amy about her dark secret. Jacinda gives Julius a piece of advice upon learning of his quarrel with their eldest son.
15	15	"Fall of the House of Lamadrid"	"Trahedya"	August 10, 2023	1.5%
Unaware that her dark past has been exposed, Diana is shaken to the core when a tragedy befalls Julius. Badong gets assigned to investigate the incident with his new partner, Jonaf.
16	16	"Heir Apparent"	"Tagapagmana"	August 11, 2023	1.3%
Jacinda threatens to throw Diana in jail as she doubts the latter's innocence in the untimely death of her former husband. Tension ensues following the announcement of Julius' heir.
17	17	"Foul Play"	"Imbestigasyon"	August 12, 2023	1.6%
Jacinda orders her private investigator to dig up dirt on Diana and her sister Amy. Jonaf receives vital Information on the murder of his father while Baby's failure to steal from the Lamadrids drives Badong desperate to pay his family's debt.
18	18	"Two-Faced"	"Dalawang Mukha"	August 14, 2023	1.4%
Much to Osang and Kano's shock, Angela and Elon show up on their doorstep in hopes of interviewing Amy's adoptive family. Baby finds herself at a loss for words when Diana discovers Hilary at their house.
19	19	"Viral Scandal"	"Bulgar"	August 15, 2023	1.2%
Diana gets bombarded with malicious news about her past. The Abiog siblings carry out a new burglary mission, but Jonaf and her friends get wind of the crime and soon arrive before they could finish their business.
20	20	"Almost Caught-Up"	"Dakpin"	August 16, 2023	1.5%
During their mission, the Abiog siblings get into a scuffle with Jonaf on their way out. In the midst of her scandal, Diana receives comforting words from Elon. Badong cooks up another sinister plot to steal money from Diana.
21	21	"Impending Plans"	"Tugunan"	August 17, 2023	1.4%
Sensing something amiss with her elusiveness, Angela figures out an unscrupulous way to score an interview with Amy. Though they share the same goal, Vlad takes issue with Jacinda's way of ousting Diana from her CEO post.
22	22	"The Conspiracy"	"Sabwat"	August 18, 2023	1.6%
Jacinda's dirty tricks against Diana manage to convince the board of Lamadrid Land to convene an election for its next CEO. An unexpected turn of events derails Badong and Kano's plan to kidnap Baby.
23	23	"The Abductor"	"Kidnap"	August 19, 2023	N/A
An anxious Diana and a determined Angela, along with Vera and Elon, follow the police as they chase Baby’s abductors. The Abiogs try to find a way to escape from Xyrus’ hands, but a twist of fate leaves them in utter shock.
24	24	"Devil in the Details"	"Imbestiga"	August 21, 2023	1.3%
Jacinda and Vlad grow convinced that Amy's foiled abduction was part of Diana's scheme to stop the ouster plots against her. To protect her sister, Diana requests a security detail headed by someone she trusts.
25	25	"Thicker than Blood"	"Kadugo"	August 22, 2023	1.3%
Baby vows to help Diana find her other sister Beth, while Angela continues digging for clues about Badong's background. Elon earns the ire of his family when he chooses Diana to become the CEO of Lamadrid Land over his brother Vlad.
26	26	"Wisdom of our Fathers"	"Pang-aral"	August 23, 2023	1.2%
Elon remembers Julius' words of wisdom as Jacinda continues to berate him for choosing Diana over his family. Baby visits Jonaf to comfort him over his father's death. Kano figures out a way to stop the nosy Angela.
27	27	"Nightmares Brought to Light"	"Nakaraan"	August 24, 2023	1.6%
Kano executes his plan against Angela, triggering the reporter's past traumatic experience to resurface. Elon, meanwhile, stumbles upon Angela's board filled with news clippings about his family.
28	28	"The Second Paraiso Sister"	"Banta"	August 25, 2023	1.7%
Baby seeks Jonaf's help in tracking down Diana's missing sister, Beth. Angela finds herself in hot water as she irks the Lamadrid Land CEO. Diana, meanwhile, learns about Jacinda's dirty tricks.
29	29	"Digging Up the Past"	"Halungkatin"	August 26, 2023	N/A
Jacinda finds out that Angela is the culprit behind the exposure of Diana’s past as an escort during Amy’s birthday party. Baby and Jonaf seek Elon’s help to get a piece of crucial information about Beth’s whereabouts.
30	30	"Truth Be Told"	"Payak"	August 28, 2023	1.9%
Diana pays Magdalena a visit to prison in hopes of finding Beth's whereabouts. As she relives her childhood trauma, Angela vows to exact retribution against Diana for selling her twenty years ago.
31	31	"Reasonable Doubt"	"Pangamba"	August 29, 2023	1.7%
Diana is filled with guilt over the possibility that Beth suffered after the former sold the latter off. Just when Angela becomes upset at Elon for helping his stepmother, Diana seeks the reporter's aid in finding the last missing Paraiso sister.
32	32	"Face Your Demons"	"Pruweba"	August 30, 2023	1.4%
Jacinda resorts to blackmail to convince Angela to work with her in destroying Diana. Angela, meanwhile, decides to face her demon upon learning that the eldest Paraiso sister recently met with Magdalena.
33	33	"The Unspoken Truth"	"Bunyag"	August 31, 2023	N/A
Jonaf rejects Hilary's love confession, triggering the heartbroken woman to unleash her pent-up emotions on Baby. Badong grows upset upon learning that Baby is devoting her time and effort to finding Beth.
34	34	"Shadow of a Doubt"	"Kutob"	September 1, 2023	1.2%
Badong orders Jonaf to halt his investigation on Beth, claiming that it could put Baby's life at risk. A glimpse of the Abiogs' painful past is revealed as Osang fears the consequences of her family's deception.
35	35	"The Secret Bracelet"	"Lihim"	September 2, 2023	N/A
Osang worries for Badong as he prepares to meet with the syndicate leader. Unaware of Jacinda's ploy, Diana confronts Angela during the investors' summit for what she did during Amy's party.
36	36	"Ultimate Betrayal"	"Traydor"	September 4, 2023	N/A
Enraged over Diana's latest scandal, Vlad asks her to step down from her CEO post. Unaware that she is being spied on, Baby sneaks into Angela's house, where she stumbles upon a familiar bracelet.
37	37	"The Truth Uncovered"	"Pagtuklas"	September 5, 2023	1.1%
Driven by her hunch about Angela's true identity, Baby convinces Jonaf that they dig into the reporter's background. Jacinda learns about Baby sneaking into Angela's place, while Elvira reaches a decision regarding Angela's future with MNN.
38	38	"Hope and Despair"	"Lunas"	September 6, 2023	1.3%
Diana tries to make amends with Angela upon confirming that the latter is her long-lost sister, Beth, only for the third Paraiso sister to fly into a rage. Elon, meanwhile, confronts the reporter for taking advantage of his connection to Diana.
39	39	"Naked Truth"	"Pamana"	September 7, 2023	N/A
Diana nominates Amy and Beth as her heirs. Angela rejects the offer and chides her sister for selling her in the past. Overhearing the plan of the Lamadrid Land CEO, Hilary reminds a reluctant Baby of their goal.
40	40	"Rage"	"Galit"	September 8, 2023	N/A
All hell breaks loose in the Abiog household when Badong finds out that Hilary has been visiting Diana's mansion frequently. Running away from home with Hilary, Kano decides to take matters into his own hands.
41	41	"Downcasted"	"Guho"	September 9, 2023	1.5%
Angela attempts to apologize to Elon for befriending him for personal gain, but to no avail. Diana begins to doubt Amy upon seeing the evidence that Jacinda gathered against her sister.
42	42	"The Wild Card"	"Kritikal"	September 11, 2023	N/A
Diana's life hangs in the balance following Kano's attack, prompting Baby to inform Beth about the situation. In his pursuit of the fleeing gunman, Jonaf learns the truth about his father's death.
43	43	"Blood for Blood"	"Sandugo"	September 12, 2023	1.5%
An altercation breaks between Jacinda and Baby following the incident that put both Vlad's and Diana's lives in danger. While Baby prays for Diana's recovery and vows to change for the better, Angela sets the past aside and helps her sister.
44	44	"The Wrong Piece"	"Maling Piraso"	September 13, 2023	1.4%
Angela strikes a blow against Jacinda as she finally forgives Diana. Paying no heed to Badong's request, a guilt-ridden Baby decides to come clean to the eldest Paraiso sister.
45	45	"Picking up the Pieces"	"Aresto"	September 14, 2023	1.5%
Badong and Osang scramble to leave for the province after Baby confessed the truth, until the police suddenly arrive. At the police station, the Abiogs are questioned about their involvement in the scheme against Diana.
46	46	"Dice Re-Roll"	"Resulta"	September 15, 2023	1.6%
Diana orders another DNA test to confirm Hilary's claim that she is the real Amy. In the unexpected turn of events, Badong and Baby get arrested for fraud when the results come out.
47	47	"Double or Nothing"	"Pagdating"	September 16, 2023	N/A
Osang recalls how her three children ended up with her family. While Hilary celebrates her new life, Badong and Baby wallow in despair in jail. Although Vlad is the new CEO of Lamadrid Land, Jacinda vows to get back at the Paraiso sisters.

=== Season 2 ===
No. overall	No. in season	Title	TV title	Original release date	AGB Nielsen Ratings (NUTAM People)
48	1	"In Sheep's Clothing"	"Pananagutan"	September 18, 2023	1.4%
After months of maltreatment and incarceration, Baby gets a fresh start and attempts to make amends with the people she hurt. Hilary is living her life as the new Amy, trying to convince Diana and Beth that she is really their sister.
49	2	"Cried Wolf"	"Pagpigil"	September 19, 2023	1.4%
Baby urges Hilary to stop pretending to be Amy, but her words fall on deaf ears. Likewise, Diana refuses to heed Baby's warnings despite her doubts about Hilary being her youngest sister. Badong receives a mysterious message inside the prison.
50	3	"Out of the Cage"	"Pagtikis"	September 20, 2023	1.4%
Jonaf dismisses Baby when she tries to warn him about Hilary. Badong settles the score with the person who wronged him as soon as he gets out of jail. Hialry crosses paths with Jacinda at Lamadrid Land.
51	4	"Leading the Pack"	"Pagkampi"	September 21, 2023	1.4%
Baby finds out that Hilary and Badong are conspiring together. Much to Jacinda's irritation, Diana returns from vacation earlier than expected. Osang tries to convince her husband to turn over a new leaf.
52	5	"Bringing Back the Spoils"	"Manmanan"	September 22, 2023	2.0%
Baby goes back to the Abiog house to help Beth prove that Hilary is not the real Amy, only to come across Jacinda's stolen money. At Lamadrid Land, Hilary tries to spy on Jacinda. Meanwhile, a mysterious person grows eager to meet Diana.
53	6	"The Returning Matriarch"	"Pinagmulan"	September 23, 2023	1.9%
Vlad and Vera try to convince Diana to meet with Lamadrid Land's new investor. Unfortunately, the eldest Paraiso sister bitterly recalls her parents' tragic fate as she comes face-to-face with her estranged grandmother, Amanda.
54	7	"Unexpected Connections"	"Koneksyon"	September 25, 2023	1.9%
Jacinda and Vlad worry that the unresolved tension between Diana and Amanda can negatively affect their planned merger. Meanwhile, Amanda unintentionally saves Baby from Badong, until she learns who the girl is.
55	8	"Reasonable Doubt"	"Alyansa"	September 26, 2023	1.5%
Vlad tries to make peace with Diana when they get entangled in a mishap. Wanting to get to know her grandmother, Beth visits and forms a bond with Amanda. Soon, Amanda receives an unexpected visit from her youngest granddaughter.
56	9	"The Ambiguity of Truth"	"Hiling"	September 27, 2023	1.8%
Beth and Baby conspire to uncover the truth about Hilary. Later, to Baby's surprise, Amanda asks her for a special favor. Meanwhile, reported sightings of Kano emerge.
57	10	"Secrets No More"	"Kasunduan"	September 28, 2023	1.3%
Beth seeks help from Jonaf and his colleagues as she continues her investigation of Hilary. Jacinda seizes an opportunity to hold Hilary in the palm of her hand, leading to an unexpected alliance between the judge and Badong.
58	11	"Profiling"	"Harang"	September 29, 2023	1.4%
Carlotta suspects that Diana is behind the death threats Amanda recently received. Beth carries out her plan to prove that Hilary is not her sister Amy, but Hilary finds a way to prevent the truth from coming out.
59	12	"It's a Prank!"	"Linlang"	September 30, 2023	N/A
Filled with anger and frustation after Hilary managed to take the DNA test results from them, Diana and Beth are convinced that a powerful person is backing her up. Hilary gets the shock of her life when a stalker reveals his identity.
60	13	"Rising Temperature"	"Hikayat"	October 2, 2023	1.7%
As she grows closer to Amanda, Baby attempts to steal Hilary's DNA test result to help the Paraisos. In a surprising turn of events, Diana defends Vlad's decision to merge with her estranged grandmother's company.
61	14	"Where There's Smoke"	"Komprontahin"	October 3, 2023	1.6%
Amanda offers Baby a job in her company, much to the latter's surprise. While Diana and Beth are unenthusiastic about the launch party of Lamadrid Land and Grand Horizons' merger, Badong tasks Hilary to use the event to gain Amanda's trust.
62	15	"Burning Bridges"	"Palaban"	October 4, 2023	1.9%
At the launch party of Lamadrid Land and Grand Horizons' merger, Amanda begins to eliminate the people who have been manipulating her grandchildren. Learning that Badong is about to meet Hilary, Baby heads to the event.
63	16	"Out of the Plan"	"Pakiusap"	October 5, 2023	2.0%
While Baby manages to escape from Badong's clutches, Diana finally snaps at Hilary for pretending to be Amy. As her eldest granddaughter confronts her anew, Amanda confesses how she moved heaven and earth just to reunite with the Paraiso sisters.
64	17	"Into the Fire"	"Bangungot"	October 6, 2023	1.8%
While Diana remains conflicted about forgiving her grandmother, Amanda receives good news about the real Amy. Baby manages to come to the launch party in hopes of stopping Badong’s wicked plans but soon discovers a bloody crime.
65	18	"Baptism by Fire"	"Paglilitis"	October 7, 2023	1.7%
The festive event for Lamadrid Land and Grand Horizons' merger turns into grief and sorrow with Amanda's death. Much to Baby's dismay, the authorities' investigation of the crime points to her as the prime suspect.
66	19	"Unraveling Lies and Pursuing Truth"	"Dalamhati"	October 9, 2023	1.5%
The Paraiso sisters mourn for their loss and visit Amanda's wake, only to be rebuffed by Carlotta. Jonaf begins to investigate a new suspect as a witness backs Baby's innocence. Beth senses something amiss with Raffy.
67	20	"The Burial Betrayal"	"Babala"	October 10, 2023	1.6%
Baby fishes for information from Osang about Badong’s involvement in Amanda’s murder but to no avail. Despite Carlotta’s rejection, the Paraiso sisters pay their respects at their grandmother’s burial.
68	21	"Twists of Inheritance"	"Mana"	October 11, 2023	1.8%
Amanda's revised last will and testament is revealed, much to her family's astonishment. Jacinda and Vlad are thrown into panic upon getting wind of Diana's inherited fortune.
69	22	"Unraveling the Threads"	"Kinalaman"	October 12, 2023	1.2%
Still unable to find evidence against Badong, Jonaf resolves to investigate the former’s syndicate boss. Soon after, Baby and Jonaf get involved in a car accident that the police suspect is an attempt to halt the investigation of Amanda’s murder.
70	23	"Intrigue and Deception"	"Kabado"	October 13, 2023	1.6%
Chief Regalado questions Badong regarding his involvement in Jonaf and Baby's accident. To ease the Abiogs' worries about Hilary's position in the Paraiso household, Jacinda makes an urgent plan for her to obtain all of Diana’s inherited wealth.
71	24	"The Sinister Bracelet"	"Bintang"	October 14, 2023	N/A
Diana gets into a tight spot when Jonaf questions her and Hilary about a bracelet found at Amanda's crime scene. After accepting Beth back to MNN, Elvira tries to convince the former to cover Amanda's murder case.
72	25	"Whispers of Deceit"	"Suspek"	October 16, 2023	1.7%
Baby grows conflicted as she and Jonaf continue to believe Diana's innocence amid the allegations against the eldest Paraiso sister. Jacinda stops at nothing to strip Diana of her rights to Julius' assets.
73	26	"Guilt-Driven Alliance"	"Palayas"	October 17, 2023	1.6%
Baby offers to let Diana and Beth stay in her boarding house after catching Jacinda driving them away from the mansion. Amidst the Paraiso sisters’ doubts about her intentions, Baby opens up about her guilt over her past misdeeds.
74	27	"Unraveling Diana's Descent"	"Ebidensya"	October 18, 2023	1.9%
Diana resolves to fight Jacinda's intimidation, only to find herself in big trouble when an alleged murder weapon is found in her office. To make matters worse, an unlikely foe comes forward to implicate her in Amanda's death.
75	28	"Doubt and Devotion"	"Kulong"	October 19, 2023	1.8%
Carlotta lashes out at Diana as the latter gets into jail for Amanda’s murder. Vlad confronts Jacinda about her involvement in Diana’s plight and soon offers his help to prove the eldest Paraiso sister's innocence.
76	29	"Uncovering the Judge's Game"	"Tiktikan"	October 20, 2023	1.5%
While Beth grows suspicious of Jacinda, Baby gains vital information that leads her and Jonaf to figure out the judge's involvement with Badong and Hilary. Osang lashes out at Baby after learning that the latter has been using her to help Diana.
77	30	"Entangled Deceptions"	"Katwiran"	October 21, 2023	N/A
Despite her initial refusal, Carlotta is compelled to heed Hilary’s request to stay in the Barramedas' mansion. Beth plans to make an intensive investigation on Jacinda after getting hold of some documents relating to the judge’s alleged corruption.
78	31	"The Pursuit of Justice"	"Pinsala"	October 23, 2023	2.0%
Driven by bitterness, Badong and Hilary plot their revenge against Baby. Pursuing Amanda's investigation, Beth gathers evidence that will strengthen the corruption and bribery claims against Jacinda.
79	32	"Surviving the Flames"	"Peligro"	October 24, 2023	1.6%
Baby’s world comes crumbling down when a fire ravages her boarding house. Jonaf questions Badong about the latter’s involvement in the incident but to no avail. A downhearted Diana recalls the sacrifices she made in searching for her sisters.
80	33	"Burning Secrets"	"Sangkot"	October 25, 2023	1.8%
Elon confronts Jacinda about the corruption allegations against her. Jonaf pays Badong a visit as the investigation reveals that someone has deliberately set Baby's home on fire.
81	34	"Undercover Shadows"	"Alanganin"	October 26, 2023	1.8%
Amid her plight, Baby gains hope after receiving help from the people around her. Beth suspects that Jacinda is involved in the arson incident in Baby's place, while Elon decides to find evidence regarding the accusations against his mother.
82	35	"Suspicions Unveiled"	"Pakana"	October 27, 2023	1.9%
After getting bailed out, Diana learns of Jacinda’s alleged corruption and alliance with Badong and Hilary. Beth and Elon secure more evidence against Jacinda after meeting a witness on the judge's past misdeed.
83	36	"Unearthing Scandal"	"Siwalat"	October 28, 2023	N/A
Jacinda burns with anger when MNN releases an article by Beth uncovering her bribery and corruption. Baby and Jonaf witness the attempted assassination of Jacinda's hitman, while Vlad starts doubting his mother.
84	37	"Hunter, Hunted"	"Tuntunin"	October 30, 2023	1.8%
Vlad and Elon's trust in their mother is shaken as Beth's informant implicates Jacinda in a past murder. Despite this development, the police investigation into Amanda's death reaches a dead end anew.
85	38	"Diversion"	"Palihis"	October 31, 2023	1.7%
Vlad tries to help Diana find a job, but Diana declines an offer upon learning that the favor came from him. Jacinda and the Abiogs plan to implicate another person in Amanda’s murder case to divert the police’s investigation from the judge.
86	39	"The Good Attorney"	"Puwersa"	November 1, 2023	1.8%
Jonaf and Baby investigate the urn that was sent to Amanda in the past, hoping to find a clue about the killer's identity. Just when she forms a pact with Jacinda, Hilary receives unexpected news from Beth.
87	40	"The Unconquerable Judge"	"Singil"	November 2, 2023	2.0%
Determined to stand on her own feet, Diana refuses Vlad's offer to work in Lamadrid Land again. Baby and Jonaf make a hasty conclusion about Amanda's death as they discover Raffy's secret.
88	41	"The Beloved Daughter"	"Lantaran"	November 3, 2023	1.8%
Raffy finds an unlikely ally and without a warning, he leaves Carlotta. Baby confronts a devastated Carlotta after learning the truth about the latter's identity.
89	42	"Last Dying Gift"	"Lapastangan"	November 4, 2023	N/A
With Raffy's arrest, Carlotta apologizes to her nieces and welcomes them back to the Barrameda mansion. While Hilary manages to obtain her DNA test result, Diana and Beth receive a last parting gift from Amanda.
90	43	"Hook, Line and Sinker"	"Rebelasyon"	November 6, 2023	2.4%
Hilary's party takes an unexpected turn when Diana and Beth confront her with the truth. Blaming Baby for ruining everything, Hilary vows to destroy her life in return. Badong seeks help from a hesitant Jacinda.
91	44	"Off the Hook"	"Pagbabanta"	November 7, 2023	1.7%
Baby eagerly seeks the truth after learning of Jonaf’s suspicion that Hilary is involved in Amanda’s murder. While the Paraisos think of a way to prove Diana’s innocence, an ally bails Hilary out of jail.
92	45	"Bycatch"	"Katibayan"	November 8, 2023	1.9%
Hilary pays no heed to Kano's warning regarding Badong. Vlad confronts Jacinda upon learning of a CCTV footage showing that someone planted the murder weapon in Diana's office. A verdict is reached in the murder trial of Amanda.
93	46	"Troubled Waters"	"Katunayan"	November 9, 2023	1.9%
Badong threatens to bring Hilary down when she reminds him of his involvement in Amanda's death. Left with no choice, a desperate Hilary turns to Jacinda for help.
94	47	"Abandon Ship"	"Dakip"	November 10, 2023	2.1%
Baby warns Osang about Badong's imminent arrest due to Hilary's confession. Meanwhile, the ex-cop turned murderer attempts to make his escape, until Jonaf and his men arrive.
95	48	"The Devil and the Sea"	"Panig"	November 11, 2023	2.2%
Badong receives an impossible demand from his mysterious boss in exchange for his life. Elon decides to stay with Vlad, intensifying Jacinda's hatred toward Diana. Baby moves back in with Osang.
96	49	"Love and Loss"	"Akusasyon"	November 13, 2023	1.8%
Diana and Carlotta get the shock of their lives upon learning that Jacinda made a hostile takeover of Grand Horizons. Jonaf professes his love for Baby. Osang receives a call from Badong.
97	50	"New Beginnings?"	"Katapatan"	November 14, 2023	2.0%
Carlotta bids goodbye to the Paraiso sisters as she leaves for the US. While Diana and Beth are determined to reclaim Grand Horizons and find Amy, Baby celebrates her graduation with the people who are close to her.
98	51	"Osang's Burden"	"Alyado"	November 15, 2023	2.1%
Osang finds herself in a tight spot when Diana and Beth ask her about Amy's bracelet, until an intoxicated Hilary suddenly arrives. Sowing a seed of doubt in Kano's mind, Hilary tries to convince him to come out of hiding.
99	52	"Hide and Seek"	"Katotohanan"	November 16, 2023	2.1%
Kano discovers a devastating truth just as Baby decides to look for their own respective families. While Badong and Jacinda forge a new plan against the Paraiso sisters, Vlad agrees to help Diana in getting Grand Horizons back.
100	53	"Love is a Battle"	"Pagtakas"	November 17, 2023	2.1%
Jonaf's recent encounter with an elusive Badong prompts Baby to make a decision about her deepening bond with the promising cop. Elon vows to fight for Beth now that they have taken their relationship to the next level.
101	54	"Unravel"	"Sakim"	November 18, 2023	2.0%
The Paraiso sisters learn that Osang recently met with Beth's kidnapper. Baby bitterly confronts her adoptive mother after Kano informed her about his discovery regarding Osang and Badong.
102	55	"Twists of Betrayal"	"Bitag"	November 20, 2023	2.0%
A guilt-ridden Baby comes clean to Jonaf about her connection with Kano and orchestrates her adoptive brother's arrest. Diana and Beth plan to talk to Osang to learn more about Amy's whereabouts.
103	56	"Kidnapped Memories"	"Kakampi"	November 21, 2023	1.9%
Kano finds himself reunited with the Abiogs after trying to escape from the hospital. While Osang wrestles with guilt about abducting children in the past, Baby grows burdened by her hunch about the youngest Paraiso sister.
104	57	"Unforgiven Bonds"	"Kapatawaran"	November 22, 2023	1.8%
Feeling deeply betrayed, Jonaf struggles to accept Baby's apologies. Diana and Beth learn that Osang and Badong are hiding together, raising their suspicions about the Abiogs' involvement in Amy's abduction.
105	58	"Undercover Tensions"	"Suspetsya"	November 23, 2023	2.0%
Jacinda and Badong strategize their next move against the Paraiso sisters. Baby discovers a newborn wristband in Osang's files, reigniting Diana's doubt about her.
106	59	"Entangled Fates"	"Pagtiwala"	November 24, 2023	1.9%
Vlad offers to help Diana in finding Amy. Osang discovers Badong's plan against the Paraiso sisters. Beth and Baby receive a suspicious call instructing them to go to Amanda's hotel.
107	60	"Deception, Secrecy and Identity"	"Mapasakamay"	November 25, 2023	N/A
While Osang grows deeply worried for her, Baby races against time to save Beth from Badong's sinister plot. Meanwhile, Beth makes a pivotal discovery as she remains trapped inside Amanda's office.
108	61	"Office Of Secrets"	"Ransom"	November 27, 2023	2.3%
Badong instills fear and panic as he asks a P50-million ransom from Diana in exchange for Beth's safety. Despite Jonaf's advice against giving in to the demand, the eldest Paraiso sister grows desperate to obtain the money.
109	62	"Prisoner of Grand Elysium"	"Gantihan"	November 28, 2023	2.4%
Diana follows Badong’s demand and brings the ransom money to Amanda’s hotel, only to find Baby in an apparent alliance with the Abiogs. A remorseful Beth prays to get through her plight and reveal her discovery about Baby.
110	63	"Trial Of Fire"	"Pagsabog"	November 29, 2023	2.2%
Jonaf comes face-to-face with Kano as the police attempt to secure the hotel. With minutes away from the bomb explosion, Beth and Baby rush to escape the impending disaster.
111	64	"Rebirth from the Ashes"	"Katapusan"	November 30, 2023	2.3%
Diana is filled with remorse upon learning that Baby is the real Amy after all. Without confirming Baby's discovery about her identity, Badong exacts his revenge on his adopted daughter for Osang's tragic demise.
112	65	"The Bloodied Princess"	"Luksa"	December 1, 2023	2.5%
Diana and Beth seek Jonaf's help in finding Baby, only to learn about his intention to leave the police force. Oblivious to Kano and Hilary's cunning plan, Badong is now living the life his family has always dreamed of.
113	66	"Deadly and Hollow"	"Pamamaalam"	December 2, 2023	1.8%
Diana decides to play Jacinda’s game and uses Vlad to seek revenge on the guileful judge. After bidding farewell to his colleagues in the police force, Jonaf travels out of the city to meet a friend.

=== Season 3 ===
No. overall	No. in season	Title	TV title	Original release date	AGB Nielsen Ratings (NUTAM People)
114	1	"Rescue and Survive"	"Pagtapat"	December 4, 2023	1.9%
In an unexpected twist of fate, Osang is revealed to have survived the explosion with Jonaf's help. Realizing that danger is still lurking around them, Amy decides against reuniting with her sisters just yet.
115	2	"Sabotage"	"Patibong"	December 5, 2023	1.8%
Diana and Beth receive an update from the police regarding the whereabouts of their sister. Amy and Jonaf sabotage Badong’s new human trafficking operations, stirring up speculations among the Abiogs.
116	3	"Connections"	"Katiyakan"	December 6, 2023	2.3%
While Amy watches Diana and Beth longingly from afar, Badong begins to suspect that his adopted daughter was the one who sabotaged his operation. Jacinda gains an ally in keeping the Paraiso sisters away from her sons.
117	4	"Break in, Breakthrough"	"Illegal"	December 7, 2023	2.4%
Amy and Jonaf continue to disrupt Badong's illegal operations, with Osang secretly observing them. Beth and Elon discover a lead in their search for the missing Paraiso sister.
118	5	"Facing Demons"	"Pagsagip"	December 8, 2023	2.8%
Jonaf secretly faces an old adversary, while Amy and Osang grow puzzled by his behavior. Despite the authorities’ doubts about Jonaf’s involvement with Amy, Beth confronts the former policeman in hopes of learning her sister’s whereabouts.
119	6	"Release"	"Paghiganti"	December 9, 2023	N/A
A guilt-stricken Osang reunites with Kano after Amy managed to dissuade Jonaf from taking matters into his own hands. Diana informs Vera about her risky plot against Jacinda.
120	7	"The Unraveling Intrigue"	"Suplong"	December 11, 2023	2.0%
With a cunning plan in mind, Osang seizes the opportunity to escape with Kano. Beth begins to suspect that Jonaf knows about Amy's whereabouts. Jacinda gets blindsided by Vlad's new business deal.
121	8	"Fatal Betrayal"	"Paglisan"	December 12, 2023	2.5%
Amy and Jonaf arrive just in time to save Osang from Kano's wrath over her betrayal, but the tense encounter between them leads to Kano’s tragic fate. Badong suspects that Amy is connected to the person responsible for Kano's death.
122	9	"Crossroads of Trust"	"Kasangga"	December 13, 2023	2.1%
Beth decides to look into Criselda's background as her father's alleged friend offers to help in the search for Amy. Elon plans a surprise birthday party for his beloved. Badong finally gets the chance to meet the syndicate's mysterious leader.
123	10	"Heartbreaking Revelation"	"Pagkilala"	December 14, 2023	2.0%
Badong and Hilary are taken aback when they come face-to-face with the syndicate's real leader. Criselda vows to get rid of the Paraiso sisters as her heartbreaking past is revealed.
124	11	"A Birthday Deception"	"Sorpresa"	December 15, 2023	2.0%
With Vlad and Diana's help, Elon pulls a surprise on Beth for her birthday. Unfortunately, Badong gets wind of the celebration and spots an opportunity to lure Amy into the open.
125	12	"A Shocking Proposal"	"Bihag"	December 16, 2023	2.4%
Beth's special day takes a turn for the worse as Badong sets his sinister plot in motion. Despite Jonaf's warning, Amy grows determined to save her sisters.
126	13	"Belly of the Beast"	"Pagtagpo"	December 18, 2023	2.1%
The Paraiso sisters manage to turn the tide against Badong, leading to their long overdue reunion. Convinced that her adoptive father will continue to pursue her family, Amy makes a heartbreaking decision.
127	14	"Refusal of Return"	"Panganib"	December 19, 2023	2.1%
Amy leaves her sisters to save them from Badong’s wrath and soon finds herself face-to-face with her enemy. Capt. Regalado suspects that the Paraiso sisters are hiding something after questioning them about the hostage-taking incident.
128	15	"Call to Action"	"Puntirya"	December 20, 2023	2.1%
Badong finds an opportunity to locate Amy's hideout when Jonaf visits the precinct to ask for an update about the syndicate. Jacinda sees red upon learning of Elon's engagement to Beth.
129	16	"Meeting the Goddess"	"Pagmamasid"	December 21, 2023	2.3%
Badong arrives at the province and begins looking for Amy. Growing suspicious of Criselda's real intentions, Diana accepts her offer in search of the missing Paraiso sister.
130	17	"Dark Night of the Soul"	"Pagdurusa"	December 22, 2023	2.3%
Unaware that Badong has taken Osang against her will, Amy grows worried for her adoptive mother. Meanwhile, the Abiog matriarch begs Hilary to help escape Badong's clutches.
131	18	"Paying the Price"	"Pahamak"	December 23, 2023	3.0%
Amy secretly meets up with her sisters to ask for help in finding Osang. Diana accepts Criselda’s aid in searching for her youngest sister, while Badong tries to win back Osang’s trust by showering her with expensive gifts.
132	19	"Playing Hide and Seek"	"Balatkayo"	December 25, 2023	1.3%
Unaware that Badong is using her as bait, Osang contacts Amy and gives her details regarding her location. Beth and Elon discover something shady about Criselda.
133	20	"Trap"	"Paalala"	December 26, 2023	2.9%
Amy tries to contact Osang, unaware that her adoptive mother is having a kidney transplant. While Badong thinks of a plan to trap Amy, Beth tries to coax Criselda into doing an interview.
134	21	"To Catch an Enemy"	"Planado"	December 27, 2023	1.9%
While Jonaf and Amy try to confirm their suspicion, Criselda entrusts Hilary with her plan against the youngest Paraiso sister. Fed up with Jacinda's meddling, Vlad makes a shocking decision.
135	22	"Checkmate"	"Proteksyon"	December 28, 2023	2.2%
Diana feels triumphant following Vlad's resignation from Lamadrid Land. Failing to trap Badong, Jonaf prepares Amy for their next encounter with the notorious syndicate member.
136	23	"Looming Darkness"	"Kapalpakan"	December 29, 2023	2.0%
Criselda threatens Badong with Osang's life, prompting the Abiog patriarch to declare war on Amy and Jonaf. Meanwhile, Vlad makes a business proposal to Diana.
137	24	"Fighting for Love"	"Pangako"	December 30, 2023	2.2%
Amy and Hilary come face-to-face as the former rushes to save a loved one from Badong’s wicked scheme. Beth tries to stop Vlad from pursuing a relationship with Diana, while Criselda uses him to get close to the eldest Paraiso sister.
138	25	"Orchestrated Betrayal"	"Sanib Pwersa"	January 1, 2024	1.9%
While Jacinda attempts to block Criselda's business agreement with her son, Diana is left with no choice but to come clean to Vlad. Badong and Osang's anniversary celebration turns sour.
139	26	"Unmasking Criselda's Secrets"	"Pugad"	January 2, 2024	2.3%
Surmising that Criselda is the mastermind behind Badong’s evil schemes, the Paraiso sisters set out on a mission to unveil her true identity and expose her secrets. Soon, Jonaf and Amy discover the Abiogs’ hideout.
140	27	"Whispers in the Shadows"	"Pagmamatyag"	January 3, 2024	2.2%
Unaware that they are being followed, Amy and Jonaf find themselves in a dangerous situation when Badong launches an ambush attack against them. Diana discovers suspicious documents regarding Criselda's illicit business scheme.
141	28	"The Veiled Deception"	"Salakayin"	January 4, 2024	2.3%
Diana and Beth surmise that Crismira Enterprise is merely a cover-up for Criselda's illicit business activities. Much to the syndicate leader's frustration, Amy and Jonaf manage to escape from a near-fatal encounter with Badong.
142	29	"Entangled Hearts"	"Pagbitag"	January 5, 2024	2.7%
Beth bravely confronts an enraged Jacinda as Diana and Vlad fall into Criselda's trap. Amid the chaos, Vlad confesses his love to Diana. Meanwhile, Amy and Jonaf follow a lead on Badong's new hideout.
143	30	"The Silent Sorrow"	"Taguan"	January 6, 2024	N/A
Diana wastes no time in reporting Criselda to the police after Amy and Jonaf rescued her from Badong's henchmen. As she remains unfazed by the accusations against her, Criselda's deep secret slowly unravels.
144	31	"Poker Face"	"Patibong"	January 8, 2024	2.9%
Criselda, Badong, and Hilary manage to trap Beth—or so they thought. While Daniel tries to escape from captivity, Amy and Jonaf sneak into the syndicate's lair.
145	32	"Ace in the Hole"	"Biktima"	January 9, 2024	2.4%
Amy unknowingly crosses paths with her father when she infiltrates Criselda’s house in search of evidence against the syndicate leader. As Criselda rushes to escape the police with Daniel, Amy discovers a momentous truth.
146	33	"Hit and Run"	"Pagtangay"	January 10, 2024	2.6%
Now that Criselda is on the run, Diana and Beth convince Amy that they should stick together upon learning the truth about their father. Jonaf interrogates Emong in hopes of finding the syndicate leader's hideout.
147	34	"Hail Mary"	"Kabayaran"	January 11, 2024	2.5%
While his daughters interrogate one of Criselda's minions, Daniel makes a desperate plea to the syndicate leader. Badong attempts to kill the Paraiso sisters in broad daylight, prompting Amy to take matters into her own hands.
148	35	"Double Cross"	"Pagsalba"	January 12, 2024	2.3%
Jonaf and Amy follow Emong in hopes of tracking down Criselda's hideout, only to be outwitted by the syndicate member. Osang apologizes to Daniel for kidnapping Amy and vows to help him escape.
149	36	"Double Down"	"Kaanib"	January 13, 2024	2.1%
Jacinda agrees to help Criselda in her plan to destroy the Paraiso sisters. Diana grows worried for Vlad as he begins to gather information about the syndicate in hopes of finding Daniel.
150	37	"Uniting Against Shadows"	"Dawit"	January 15, 2024	2.4%
Vlad finds himself in a tight spot upon obtaining a piece of evidence against Jacinda. While Daniel warns Criselda against harming his daughters, the Paraiso sisters unite to locate their father.
151	38	"Clash of Fates"	"Sagipin"	January 16, 2024	2.0%
Jacinda confronts Criselda after receiving an arrest warrant, unaware that her sons followed her into the syndicate leader’s hideout. Soon, the Paraiso sisters infiltrate Criselda's lair in hopes of rescuing Daniel and Osang.
152	39	"Paraiso Pursuit: Unveiling Deceit"	"Reunion"	January 17, 2024	3.0%
Amy, Beth, and Diana finally reunite with Daniel. However, the heartfelt moment gets interrupted when Hilary and Criselda's henchmen arrive before the Paraiso sisters can escape.
153	40	"Shattered Bonds"	"Tapusin"	January 18, 2024	2.6%
The Paraiso sisters' attempt to escape with their loved ones ends in a tragedy as Daniel's confession ignites Criselda's wrath. While Jacinda gets arrested, Diana reflects on the past moments she shared with Vlad.
154	41	"Dangerous Decisions"	"Desisyon"	January 19, 2024	1.8%
Chief Regalado proposes that the Paraisos relocate abroad in the meantime for their safety. Unbeknownst to them, Hilary gets wind of this plan and immediately reports it to Criselda.
155	42	"Twisted Plan"	"Pagsisisi"	January 20, 2024	2.4%
The Paraiso family's carefully laid plan crumbles when Criselda's henchmen ambush them on their way to the airport. Despite Daniel's pleas, Criselda insists on having him back in her arms.
156	43	"Escape"	"Habulan"	January 22, 2024	2.2%
Yearning for a family, Criselda and Hilary form a deeper connection with each other. While Diana, Beth, and Daniel remain captive, Amy manages to get away from her abductors.
157	44	"Face Off"	"Harapan"	January 23, 2024	2.2%
Despite Daniel’s pleas to spare his daughters, Criselda remains determined to kill the Paraiso sisters. Hilary and Amy get into an emotional confrontation as the former recaptures the latter.
158	45	"Criselda's Game"	"Kasamaan"	January 24, 2024	2.9%
Amy makes a last-ditch attempt to save her family from Criselda's wrath. An intense gunfight soon ensues as Jonaf and the police finally locate the Paraiso family.
159	46	"Loss and New Beginnings"	"Sakripisyo"	January 25, 2024	3.0%
Osang makes the ultimate sacrifice to save Amy from Badong. While the Paraiso family and their friends begin a new chapter in their lives, a familiar darkness looms.
160	47	"Pledge of Love"	"Eskapo"	January 26, 2024	2.9%
Just when Amy and Jonaf get engaged, Badong escapes from prison to seek his revenge. Fortunately, the Paraiso family receives help from an unlikely ally.
161	48	"The Unbreakable Paraiso Sisters"	"Huling Laro"	January 27, 2024	2.7%
Hilary and Badong seize the opportunity to finally exact their revenge against Amy. Still finding it hard to believe that they are now reunited for good, the Paraiso family makes a promise to each other.
