= Taskforce Firewall =

2026 Philippine television drama series

- Title card
- Genre: Action; Drama
- Directed by: Rico Gutierrez
- Creative director: Aloy Adlawan
- Starring: Kylie Padilla; Miguel Tanfelix; Kyline Alcantara; Jak Roberto; Buboy Villar
- Country of origin: Philippines
- Original language: Tagalog
- No. of episodes: 130

Production
- Production locations: Metro Clark, Pampanga
- Camera setup: Multiple-camera setup
- Production company: GMA Entertainment Group

Original release
- Network: GMA Network
- Release: May 25, 2026 – present

Taskforce Firewall is a 2026 Philippine television drama action series broadcast by GMA Network. Directed by Rico Gutierrez, it stars Kylie Padilla, Miguel Tanfelix, Kyline Alcantara, Jak Roberto and Buboy Villar all in the title roles. It premiered on May 25, 2026 on the network's Prime line up.

It is streaming online on YouTube.

== Premise ==
A group of individuals becomes cyber protectors against modern digital threats. Cybercrime investigations with field operations, intense combat scenes, and technologically driven missions.

== Cast and characters ==
Cast

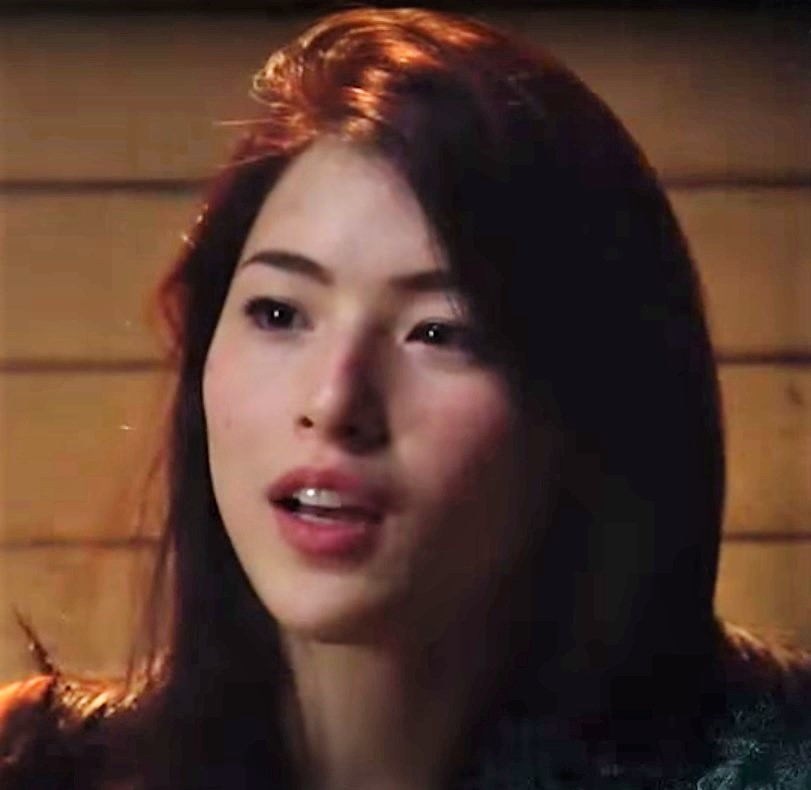
Kylie Padilla

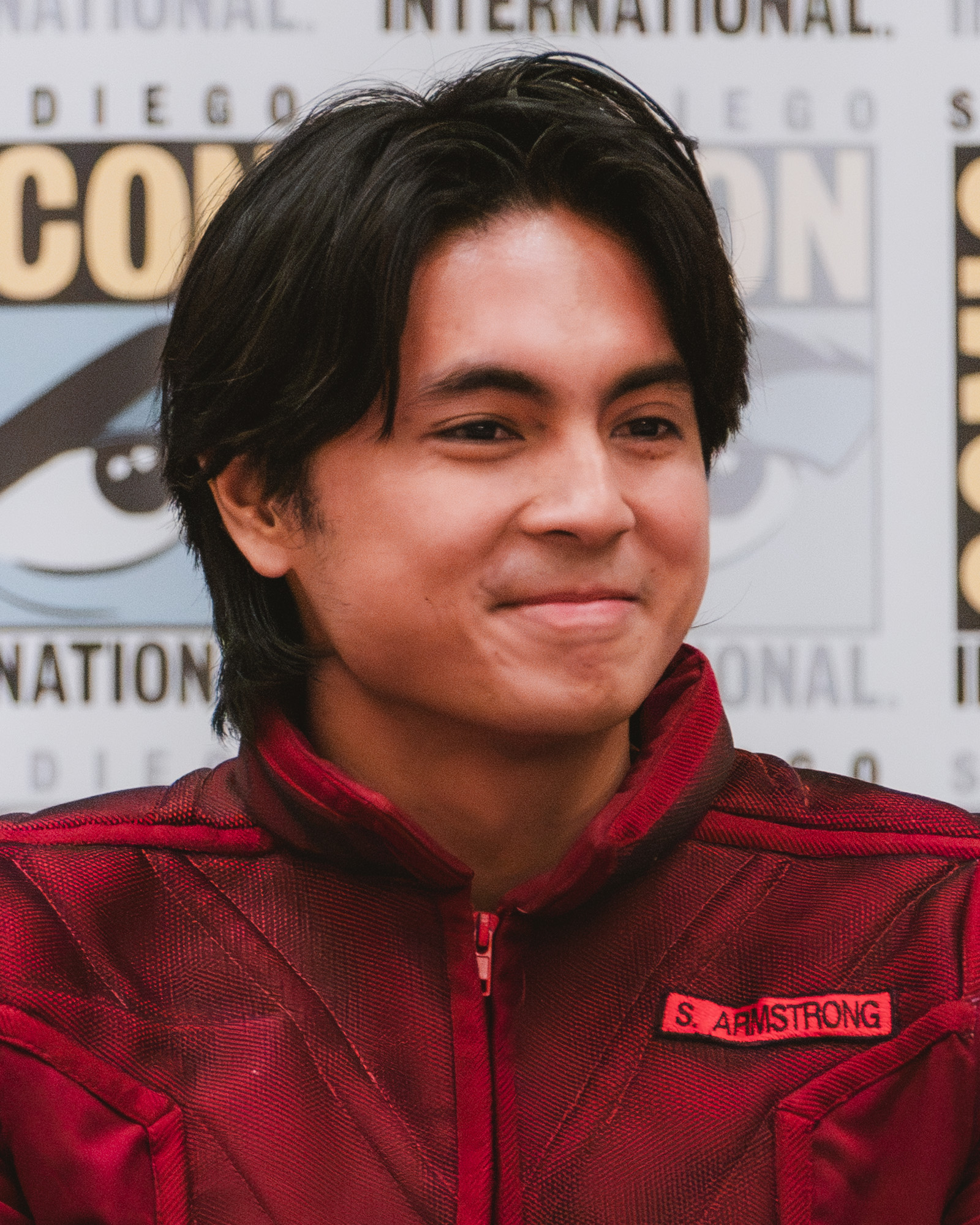
Miguel Tanfelix

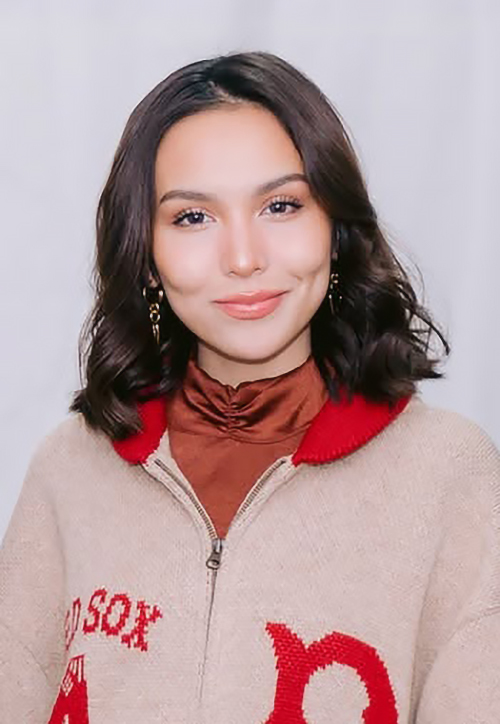
Kyline Alcantara

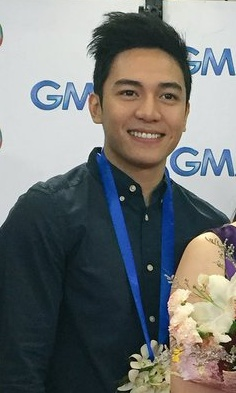
Jak Roberto

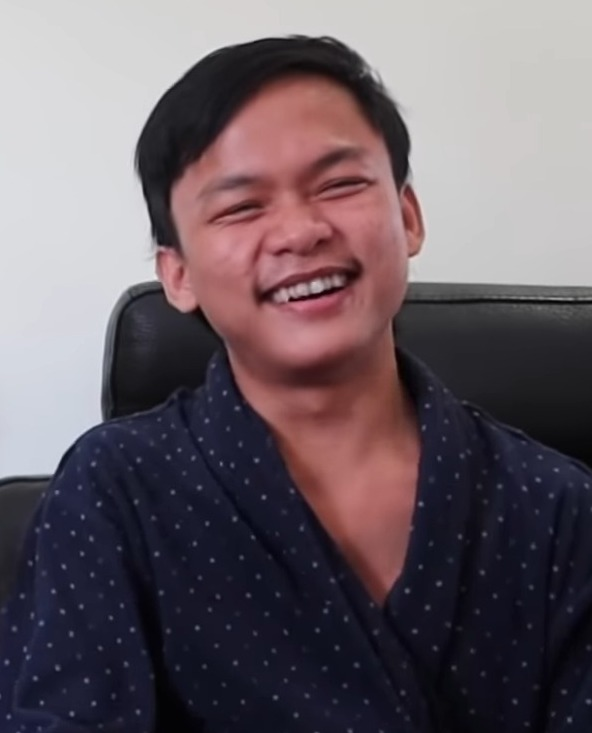
Buboy Villar

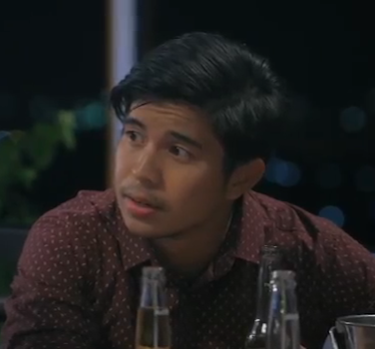
Rodjun Cruz

Lead cast

- Kylie Padilla as Isa Cervantes
- Miguel Tanfelix Galo Villareal
- Kyline Alcantara as Callie Sandoval
- Jak Roberto as Hex Silverio
- Buboy Villar Jhay-Jhay Gonzaga

Supporting cast

- Lexi Gonzales
- Cheska Fausto
- Allen Dizon as Hernan
- Dominic Ochoa as Franco
- Glenda Garcia Glo
- Rodjun Cruz
- Shayne Sava
- Anna Abad Santos
- John Vic De Guzman

Guest cast

- Yasmien Kurdi
- Mark Herras
- Luis Hontiveros as Martin
- Rhian Ramos as Cipher
- Sofia Pablo
- Iñigo Jose
- Benjamin Alves as Tan
- Zephanie as Jeni Sicat

== Development ==
The series and its cast members were announced in January 2026, with the title Firewall. In November 2026, actress Zephanie Dimaranan made an appearance as Jeni Sicat, who originated from the Philippine television musical drama series Born to Shine.

== Production ==
Principal photography commenced in March 2026. Filming took place in Metro Clark, Pampanga.

== Ratings ==
According to AGB Nielsen Philippines' Nationwide Urban Television Audience Measurement People in television homes, the pilot episode of Taskforce Firewall earned a 7.9% rating.
