= Zephanie =

Filipino singer and actress (born 2003)

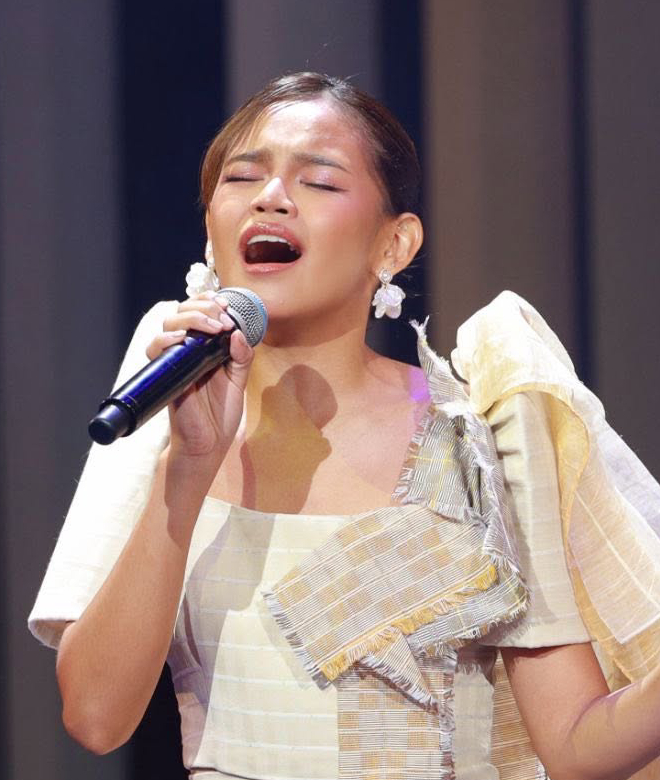
- Zephanie performing in 2025
- Born: Zephanie Odhene Liwag Dimaranan; February 14, 2003 (age 23); Biñan, Laguna, Philippines
- Occupations: Singer; songwriter; actress; host
- Agents: Cornerstone; Sparkle
- Title: This Generation's Pop Princess
- Musical career
- Genre: Pop ballad
- Instruments: Vocals, guitars
- Years active: 2012–present
- Labels: Star Music (2019–2022); Republic Records (2023–present); GMA Music (2023–present)
- Member of: Divas of the Queendom (AOS); Super Champions (AOS)
- Formerly of: New Gen Divas (ASAP)

Zephanie Odhene Liwag Dimaranan (Tagalog: [ˌsɛː.pɐˈni]; born February 14, 2003), also known mononymously as Zephanie, is a Filipino singer, actress and host. She is known as the winner of the first season of Idol Philippines. Dimaranan is dubbed as "This Generation's Pop Princess" in the country by various media outlets.

Zephanie was hailed as the "New Female Recording Artist of the Year" at the 12th PMPC Star Awards for Music and Singer of the Year in the first KUMU Livestreaming Awards. She joined the Himig 11th Edition as the interpreter of "Tinadhana Sa'Yo", which won MOR's Choice and TFC's Global Choice Awards. As of January 2022, she has surpassed 10 million all-time streams on Spotify. Her self-titled debut album “Zephanie” immediately hit No. 1 on iTunes Philippines upon release while all-tracks charted within the Top 100.

Her song "Sabihin Mo Na Lang Kasi" was listed as one of the most successful songs released in 2020 by Star Music with a combined of over a million streams. She notably was one of the 12 winners to be chosen to join the Now United bootcamp in Abu Dhabi in September 2021. Dimaranan also performed a duet with Brian McFadden, member of Irish boy band Westlife during his concert in the Philippines.

She is currently an artist under GMA Network, as a mainstay of the variety show, All-Out Sundays since 2022. In 2024, Zephanie also released a new album compilation produced by GMA Music and a music single produced by GMA Playlist in 2025.

== Early life ==
Zephanie Odhene Liwag Dimaranan was born and raised in Biñan, Laguna, third of five kids. She described her parents (her father is a pastor) as strict but according to her, she and her siblings learned so much from them.

== Career ==
=== Early beginnings ===
Prior to her participations in singing contests, Zephanie started her career as a child actress.

Her first television appearance was in 2012, via GMA Network's Biritera, which she thought it was a singing contest, turned out to be a musical drama series and ended up getting a role.

Later in 2013, Zephanie also played a minor role in a Christmas episode of ABS-CBN's fantasy anthology, Wansapanataym.

=== Journey in singing contests; Championship in Idol Philippines ===
In 2015, Zephanie joined the second season of The Voice Kids, where she was eliminated in the first week of the semifinals. The same year, The Voice Kids season 2 released their album, composed of twelve songs sung by the Semi-finalists including Zephanie with the songs Flashlight and Saan Darating Ang Umaga.

Few years after, she started to do some cover songs on her YouTube channel, one of which is 'Till I Met You, which had garnered more than a million hits since it was uploaded.

In 2018, she participated in the second season of Tawag ng Tanghalan, where she lost against the eventual champion Janine Berdin.

In May 2019, her audition on Idol Philippines was aired and immediately hit a million views on YouTube. Since then, her performances in the said TV show was one of the most viewed performances. During the last part of the Final Showdown, the 3 finalists sung their original songs, which were also released on Spotify including her song Pangarap Kong Pangarap Mo composed by record producer Jonathan Manalo. On July 28, 2019, she was hailed as the first grand winner of Idol Philippines after garnering 100 percent of the votes, earning a ₱2,000,000 cash prize, along with an all-expense trip to Taiwan, a house and lot from Camella Homes, and a contract with Star Music.

=== Breakthrough ===
In August 2019, Zephanie was launched as a new regular performer of ASAP Natin 'To and eventually became part of an all-female vocal group named "J.E.Z", together with Janine Berdin and Elha Nympha.

On September 3, 2019, Zephanie's rendition of Ebe Dancel’s “Bawat Daan” in the TV series ‘The Killer Bride,’ was heard on the teaser trailer for the September 4 episode. The song was released on September 27 in all digital music platforms together with the duet version with Ebe Dancel.

On September 28, 2019, an episode about her life story was aired in the TV Drama Anthology Series Maalaala Mo Kaya, titled "Contest". She was portrayed by Maris Racal, with Yesha Camile portraying the younger Zephanie.

On November 16 & 17, Zephanie joined former Westlife member Brian McFadden on his First Major Solo Concert in the Philippines called "Romantic Intimate Concert" at Waterfront Cebu and New Frontier Theater.

Few days after, Zephanie held her first major solo concert on November 28, 2019, at the New Frontier Theater, with Sarah Geronimo, Elha Nympha, Idol Philippines Top 4 – Lance, Lucas, Dan and Miguel, Erik Santos and Regine Velasquez (Moira Dela Torre and Janine Berdin were originally supposed to be part of the concert's special guests, but pulled out due to health issues.) as her special guests. During the concert, "Pangako Ko", was released on YouTube as a digital single and it was later released on January 24, 2020, to streaming sites.

On February 7, 2020, she released her first movie theme song "Simpleng Tao" originally sung by Gloc-9 for the movie ''James and Pat and Dave". She released another single under Star Music "Sabihin Mo Na Lang Kasi" on July 24, 2020.

In March 2020, she was launched as one of the faces of Palmolive Naturals Shampoo along with Maine Mendoza.

On July 29, 2020, Zephanie debuted as the host together with Kyle Echarri as they launched their online music variety show entitled "CSTV Presents: Artist Lab", appearing on Cornerstone Entertainment's Facebook Page with simultaneous streaming on their Official Facebook pages. The show was originally set to last for 4 consecutive weeks every Wednesday. However, the online show was suspended from August 4, 2020, after Metro Manila was placed under a modified Enhanced Community Quarantine for 2 weeks. The show returned on October 16, 2020, with a new timeslot every Fridays instead of Wednesdays. The resumed season lasted until November 6, 2020.

=== Sunday Noontime Live! stint ===
In October 2020, after not appearing on ASAP for 7 months, amidst the shutdown and franchise crisis of ABS-CBN during the COVID-19 pandemic, Zephanie became a part of "Sunday Noontime Live!", a Sunday noontime musical variety show which was produced by Brightlight Productions and Cornerstone Entertainment Studios that was aired on TV5 through a blocktime agreement between Brightlight and TV5. She was part of the segment entitled "Ultimate Vocal Showdown" with Fatima Louise Lagueras a.k.a Fana, Sassa Dagdag, Sam Mangubat and Niel Murillo of BoybandPH. The show only lasted for three months before it was cancelled on January 17, 2021, being replaced by a simulcast of ASAP Natin 'To on the said network's noontime timeslot.

She was launched as one of the 12 interpreters of Himig Handog 11th Edition with a song entitled "Tinadhana Sa'Yo", composed by SJ Gandia from the United States. The song was released on November 13, 2020, while its associated music video were released on January 2, 2021.

On October 26, 2020, she released a new single titled "Pasensya Na", an exclusive released under Cornerstone Music.

On November 6, 2020, Zephanie held her virtual concert titled Zuperstar on Kumu, she was the first streamer that held a concert on the said online platform. She was also awarded as the Kumu Superstar Streamer.

=== Final months with ABS-CBN ===
In February 2021, Zephanie returned to ABS-CBN following a 3-month stint under Brightlight Productions by appearing on It's Showtime's Hide N' Sing segment.

On March 7, 2021, Zephanie made her comeback to the ASAP stage after one year of not appearing on the said show, performing her Himig 11th Edition entry "Tinadhana Sa'yo". However, prior to her ASAP comeback, her group J.E.Z would be rebranded as the New Gen Divas after Sheena Belarmino joined the group. She later rejoined the aforementioned group after her comeback. The revived group officially debuted on April 25, 2021, with Zephanie representing the color green in the said group. However, her stint with the group was short-lived, as she was replaced in the August 2021 episodes following a temporary reshuffling of the group due to her absences, and did not return in the following episodes.

In 2021, she interpreted a cover of Yeng Constantino's song titled "Lapit" as the themesong for the TV series Niña Niño, produced by Spring Films and Cornerstone Studios. The song would later be included in her first album.

During the Himig 11th Edition Grand Finals, which was held on March 21, 2021, "Tinadhana Sa'Yo" won the MOR's Choice Award and TFC's Global Choice Award.

In August 2021, Dreamscape Entertainment announced the Official Soundtrack of the series Marry Me, Marry You which includes Zephanie's rendition of "One Day" originally sung by Angeline Quinto and it was digitally released on August 27, 2021. The said series aired its first episode on September 13.

On August 24, 2021, she was featured in another commercial of Palmolive Naturals Shampoo along with Julia Barretto and Angelina Cruz.

On August 31, 2021, it was revealed that Zephanie was among the 12 winners of the Camp Now United competition, and she flew to Abu Dhabi on September 15, 2021, to attend a bootcamp of the global pop group Now United. She, along with the other 10 bootcampers, underwent vocal training with Joseph Clarke and choreography training with Kyle Hanagami. Also, she would appear on the song "Good Days", an original song recorded for the bootcampers. She would also appear on a special performance of the group's single "Come Together" along with the other bootcampers and Now United themselves. Following the 2-week stint in the bootcamp, she returned to the Philippines on September 30, 2021.

In October 2021, during the 12th PMPC Star Awards for Music, Zephanie won the New Female Recording Artist of the Year for her first single "Pangarap Kong Pangarap Mo".

On November 8, 2021, she was launched as one of the new generation artists of Cornerstone Entertainment through their Gen C launch event and renewed her contract with the said management.

In November 2021, Zephanie was featured in another Palmolive commercial along with Julia Montes, and would release a new commercial jingle titled “BNCY”.

In December 2021, she released a Christmas song entitled "A Merry Merry Cheer", a collaboration with Singaporean music artist and producer, Zadon.

Also in the same month, she made her return to free TV by appearing on Atin Ang Paskong Ito, Kapatid!: The 2021 TV5 Christmas Celebration, in which, she performed "Lapit", the themesong of the network's TV series, Niña Niño.

In the first week of the year 2022, Zephanie finally released her self-titled debut album, which showcases her previously released singles and original songs with a carrier single “Magpakita Ka Na" composed by Miguel Mendoza III, the composer of the hit song "Isa Pang Araw", which she also has a rendition included on her album. Its music video was released on February 22.

=== Return to GMA Network; Acting debut ===
After two and a half years in ABS-CBN, Zephanie returned to her home network, GMA on March 31, 2022, as she signed a contract with their talent agency Sparkle, while remaining co-managed by Cornerstone Entertainment. 8 months after her last ASAP appearance, she made her debut on All-Out Sundays on April 3, 2022, becoming one of their performers and co-hosts.

She also performed various theme songs of the said network's drama series. Her first was "Tunay Na Minamahal" from the 2022-hit afternoon prime series, Apoy sa Langit and "Kaagapay" from Bolera.

She was also one of the 30 artists who performed in Mr. Music: The Hits of Jonathan Manalo, a concert held at the Newport Performing Arts Theater in Resorts World Manila (now Newport World Resorts Manila). During the concert, she performed her first single "Pangarap Kong Pangarap Mo" and "Pag-Ibig Na Kaya", which is a duet with Jeremy G.

In February 2023, she inked a recording deal with Republic Records, a label where international singers such as Taylor Swift and Ariana Grande are signed. She also sung the GMA's Kapuso Month 2023 Jingle entitled "Love Is Us Always and Forever" with Michael Sager.

In May 26, 2023, she released her rendition of "Since I Found You" under Universal Records, as part of Christian Bautista's 20th Anniversary Tribute Album.

October 2023, she debuted as an actress on her first TV series entitled #Frenemies, the first installment of youth-oriented anthology, Sparkle U. However, in 2024, she later reprise her respective role in its third installment #SoundTrip, together with her co-stars in the first installment.

She continued to sing various Official Soundtrack from GMA Drama series such as "Can This Be Love" for Luv Is: Caught in his Arms, "Walang Ibang Dahilan" for Arabella and "Kung Ang Puso" for Lovers & Liars.

In Disney's 100th anniversary, she is tapped to record the Filipino rendition of Ariana DeBose's song "This Wish", translated as "Aking Hiling".

In January 2024, she performed at the 28th Asian Television Awards in Ho Chi Minh, Vietnam to represent the country.

In April 2024, she released her rendition of Sabihin originally sung by Zelle under Republic Records Philippines. She also released Nagbago Ang Daigdig as the official soundtrack of Marian Rivera's comeback GMA Primetime series, My Guardian Alien and digitally released on May 3, 2024.

In the same month, she came back as an actress in Daig Kayo ng Lola Ko: Mga Hero ni Jiro as a brave girl scout with three episodes.

In July 2024, she was revealed as part of the GMA action-drama series, Mga Batang Riles, together with Miguel Tanfelix, Raheel Bhyria, Bruce Roeland, Antonio Vinzon and Kokoy De Santos. Later that month, she appeared as a guest role at the GMA historical series Pulang Araw as one of the Filipina vaudeville performers and comedienne Chicháy.

In August 2024, she was introduced as one of the lead stars of GMA Public Affairs's youth oriented series entitled Maka, along with Ashley Sarmiento and Marco Masa.

In October 2024, she digitally released her song "Ganito Ako Babangon", an official soundtrack of GMA Afternoon Prime series "Prinsesa ng City Jail" that aired in 2025.

In December 2024, she was introduced as one of the singers of the new OST of Unang Hirit for their 25th Anniversary, together with Mark Bautista and Jose Mari Chan. She also released her rendition of "Magkabilaan" with Apoc, the original theme song of MMFF 2024 entry "The Kingdom".

In January 2025, she debuted on GMA Prime as Mutya in Mga Batang Riles as Kidlat's (Miguel Tanfelix) love interest., and sung its official themesong "Batang Riles" with the rapper, Hero.

In February 2025, she still leads the GMA Public Affairs' youth-oriented show MAKA, as they entered the second season. She also starred on Sparkle's digital series "MINE" with her co-actors in MAKA Season 2, Shan Vesagas and Josh Ford.

In the same month, Zephanie sung her rendition of the hit song "Tameme", one of the soundtracks of the Marvin and Jolina comeback movie "Ex Ex Lovers".

April 2025, she released her comeback single entitled, "Kunwari Lang". And later released its music video featuring her Mga Batang Riles co-star, Miguel Tanfelix., and also became as their themesong in the series.

Later that month, she became the digital cover of Village Pipol Magazine for the month of April. And also became the main performer of VP Choice Awards in May 2025, performing her single, Kunwari Lang.

She again represented the country when she performed at the World Expo 2025 in Osaka, Japan in June 2025.

In July 2025, she recorded the newest theme song of Wish Ko Lang! for its 23rd Anniversary, which digitally released in October.

In November 2025, Zephanie landed her first-ever lead role on GMA's afternoon prime, entitled Born to Shine premiered on March 23, 2026. She portrays the role of Jeni Sicat, who become the leader of the fictional girl group, YUMI.

October 2026, she held her first fan meet, "Shine Zephanie" at SM North EDSA Skydome.

== Filmography ==
=== Television ===
Year	Title	Role	Notes
2012	Biritera		First television appearance
2013	Wansapanataym: Give Gloves on Christmas Day	Caroller	Episode role
2015	The Voice Kids (season 2)	Herself	Contestant / Semi Finalist
2015	Umagang Kay Ganda	Herself	Guest
2018	Tawag ng Tanghalan (season 2)	Herself	Contender
2019	Idol Philippines	Herself	Contestant / Grand winner
2019	Umagang Kay Ganda	Herself	Guest
2019	Magandang Buhay	Herself	Guest
2019	It's Showtime	Herself	Guest
2019	Tonight with Boy Abunda	Herself	Guest
2019	Pinoy Big Brother: Otso Big Night	Herself	Guest Performer
2019	Gandang Gabi, Vice!	Herself	Guest
2019	Minute to Win It: Last Tandem Standing	Herself	Guest Player
2019	I Can See Your Voice	Herself	Guest
2019–2020; 2021	ASAP Natin ‘To	Herself	Performer
2020	Umagang Kay Ganda	Herself	Guest
2020–2021	Sunday Noontime Live!	Herself	Performer
2021	Lunch Out Loud	Herself	Guest
2021	It's Showtime	Herself	PPE-covered singer
2021	Magandang Buhay	Herself	Guest
2021	Atin Ang Paskong Ito, Kapatid!: The 2021 TV5 Christmas Celebration	Herself	Guest Performer (Niña Niño)
2022–present	All-Out Sundays	Herself	Performer / Co-host
2022	Unang Hirit	Herself	Guest
2022	Eat Bulaga!	Herself	Guest Performer
2022	Family Feud	Herself	Guest Player
2022	NCAA Philippines	Herself	Guest Performer
2022	Mars Pa More	Herself	Guest
2022	Sarap, 'Di Ba?	Herself	Guest
2022	Shopee 9.9. Super Shopping Day TV Special	Herself	Performer
2022	TiktoClock	Herself	Guest Performer and Player
2023	Fast Talk with Boy Abunda	Herself	Guest
2023	Sparkle U: #Frenemies	Susanne "Sue" Gara	Supporting role
2023	NCAA Philippines	Herself	Guest Performer
2023	Eat Bulaga!	Herself	Guest Player
2023	Unang Hirit	Herself	Guest
2023	TiktoClock	Herself	Guest Performer and Player
2024	Sparkle U: #SoundTrip	Susanne "Sue" Gara	Main role
2024	Tahanang Pinakamasaya	Herself	Guest Performer / Duet for Love judge
2024	Daig Kayo ng Lola Ko: Mga Hero ni Jiro	Lucy	Main role
2024	Pulang Araw	Chichay	Guest role
2024	Maka	Zeph Molina	Main role
2024	NCAA Philippines	Herself	Guest Performer
2024	It's Showtime	Herself	Guest Performer
2024	Eat Bulaga!	Herself	Guest Performer
2024	Unang Hirit	Herself	Guest Performer
2024	TiktoClock	Herself	Guest Performer and Player
2025	Mga Batang Riles	Mutya Bitangcol	Supporting Role
2025	Maka (season 2)	Zeph Molina	Main role
2025	Maka Lovestream: Manifestions	Faith	Main role
2025	Maka Lovestream: Last Christmas	Erika	Main role
2026–present	Born to Shine	Jeni Reyes-Sicat/Jeni Reyes Halari	Main role
2026	Kamao	Jeni Sicat	Guest role
2026	Taskforce Firewall	Jeni Sicat	Guest role
2026	TiktoClock	Herself	Guest
2026	Fast Talk with Boy Abunda	Herself	Guest
2026	It's Showtime	Herself	Guest
TBA	My Daddy Long Legs	TBA	

== Discography ==
=== Albums ===
List of extended plays, with selected details
Title	Album details
Zephanie	Full release: January 7, 2022; Label: Star Music; Formats: Digital download, streaming; Track listing: 1. "Pangarap Kong Pangarap Mo"; 2. "Bawat Daan"; 3. "Sabihin Mo Na Lang Kasi"; 4. "Pangako Ko"; 5. "Tinadhana Sa'Yo"; 6. "Magpakita Ka Na"; 7. "Lapit"; 8. "Pag-ibig Na Kaya"; 9. "Isa Pang Araw"; 10. "Tinadhana Sa 'Yo"

=== Singles ===
Year	Song Title	Album	Composer	Company
2015	Flashlight	The Voice Kids Season 2 The Album	–	MCA Music
2015	Saan Darating Ang Umaga	The Voice Kids Season 2 The Album	–	MCA Music
2015	God Rest Ye Merry Gentlemen	My Christmas Album All Stars (Deluxe)	–	MCA Music
2019	Pangarap Kong Pangarap Mo	Idol Philippines (Originals)	Jonathan Manalo	Star Music
2019	Bawat Daan	The Killer Bride (Original Soundtrack)	Ebe Dancel	Star Music
2019	Bawat Daan duet with Ebe Dancel	The Killer Bride (Original Soundtrack)	Ebe Dancel	Star Music
2020	Pangako Ko	"Zephanie"	Rex Torremoro / Elmar Jan Bolano	Star Music
2020	Simpleng Tao	James and Pat and Dave (Original Soundtrack)	Gloc-9	Star Music
2020	Sabihin Mo Na Lang Kasi	"Zephanie"	Mandy Maderal	Star Music
2020	Pasensya Na	–	Richard Poon	CS Music
2020	Tinadhana Sa'yo	Himig 11th Edition	SJ Gandia	Star Music
2021	You're All I Need	ASOP Year 6	Jessan May Mirador	CS Music
2021	One Day	Marry Me, Marry You (Original Soundtrack)	Agatha Morallos	Star Music
2021	BNCY	–	Jonathan Manalo	Star Music
2021	A Merry Merry Cheer duet with Zadon	–	Zadon	Star Music
2022	Magpakita Ka Na	"Zephanie"	Miguel Mendoza III	Star Music
2022	Isa Pang Araw	"Zephanie"	Miguel Mendoza III	Star Music
2022	Lapit	"Zephanie"	Yeng Constantino	Star Music
2022	Pag-Ibig Na Kaya duet with Jeremy G	"Zephanie"	Kim I-na & Park Geun Cheol (Tagalized by Jonathan Manalo)	Star Music
2022	Tinadhana Sa'Yo duet with Jason Dy	"Zephanie"	SJ Gandia	Star Music
2022	Kung Ikaw Ang Kasama	Sparkle (Summer Theme song)	Natasha Correos	GMA Music / GMA Playlist
2022	Tunay na Minamahal	Apoy sa Langit (Original Soundtrack)	Natasha Correos	GMA Music / GMA Playlist
2022	Kaagapay	Bolera (Original Soundtrack)	Simon L. Tan	GMA Music / GMA Playlist
2022	Luv Is (with VXON)	Luv Is: Caught In His Arms (Original Soundtrack)	VXON members	GMA Music / GMA Playlist
2022	Ikot Ng Mundo	Ikot Ng Mundo (From "Daig Kayo ng Lola Ko")	Simon L. Tan	GMA Music / GMA Playlist
2023	Can This Be Love	(Soundtrack from Luv Is: Caught In His Arms)	Ryan Cayabyab	GMA Music / GMA Playlist
2023	Love Is Us Always and Forever (with Michael Sager)	Love Is Us Always and Forever (2023 Kapuso Month Song)	Roxanne Fabian, Emmanuel Rivera, and Jann Fayel Lopez	GMA Music / GMA Playlist
2023	Wala Nang Ibang Dahilan	Arabella (Original Soundtrack)	Roxanne Fabian	GMA Music / GMA Playlist
2023	Since I Found You	The Way You Look at Me: The Songs of Christian Bautista	Lloyd John Williams / Radney Foster	Universal Records (Philippines)
2023	Reese's (with FRANCE)	From "Five Break-Ups and a Romance" (Original soundtrack)	France Siopongco	Just Music Philippines
2023	Aking Hiling	Aking Hiling - Tagalog Single Version	Benjamin Rice, Julia Michaels	Walt Disney Records
2023	Kung Ang Puso	(Soundtrack from Lovers & Liars)	Gabriel Tagadtad	Universal Music Group/Republic Records Philippines
2024				Universal Music Group/Republic Records Philippines
2024	Miss Na Kita (with VXON Franz)	20:20	Franz Chua	Universal Music Group/Republic Records Philippines
2024	Sabihin	-	Jeazell Grutas	Universal Music Group/Republic Records Philippines
2024	Nagbago ang Daigdig	(Soundtrack from My Guardian Alien)	Rina May L. Mercado	GMA Playlist
2024	Walang Hanggan	Theme From Shining Inheritance	Ann Margaret Figueroa	GMA Playlist
2024	Ganito Ako Babangon	Prinsesa ng City Jail (Original Soundtrack)	Rina May L. Mercado	GMA Playlist
2024	Catching Feelings (with Dylan Menor)	MAKA (Volume 2)	Ann Margaret Figueroa	GMA Playlist
2024	Magkabilaan (with Apoc)	From "The Kingdom"	Joey Ayala	Cornerstone Music
2025	Batang Riles (with Hero)	From "Mga Batang Riles"	Rina May L. Mercado	GMA Playlist
2025	Kunwari Lang	From "Mga Batang Riles"	Kiko Salazar	Cornerstone Music
2025	Wish Ko Lang	Wish Ko Lang! (2025 Theme Song)	Rina May L. Mercado	GMA Playlist
2025	Puno Ng Puso Ang Paskong Pinoy	2025 GMA Christmas Station ID Jingle	Josel Baraquel	GMA Music
2026	Aking Liwanag	Original Soundtrack of Born To Shine vol. 1	Kenneth Reodica	GMA Playlist
2026	Ang Kwento Ko	Original Soundtrack of Born To Shine vol. 1	Gerimaree Morales	GMA Playlist
2026	This Is Our Time (with YUMI)	Original Soundtrack of Born To Shine vol. 1	Kenneth Reodica	GMA Playlist
2026	Ikaw Ang Dahilan (with YUMI)	Original Soundtrack of Born To Shine vol. 2	Kenneth Reodica	GMA Playlist

=== EPs ===
Year	Album	Composer	Company
2019	Pangarap Kong Pangarap Mo (EP)	Jonathan Manalo	Star Music
2024	Sparkle U Soundtrip (Official Soundtrack)	-	GMA Playlist
2024	MAKA (Original Soundtrack)	Natasha Correos/ Ann Margaret Figueroa	GMA Playlist
2024	MAKA (Volume 2)	Natasha Correos/ Ann Margaret Figueroa	GMA Playlist

=== Chart performance ===
Year	Title	Peak (iTunes PH Top 100)	Peak (MOR 101.9 Chart)	Peak (Philippines Viral 50)
2019	Pangarap Kong Pangarap Mo	2	1	22
2019	Bawat Daan (Solo Version)	4	2	14
2019	Bawat Daan with Ebe Dancel	12	-	–
2020	Pangako Ko	8	1	–
2020	Simpleng Tao	67	8	–

=== Concerts ===
Date	Title	Venue	Description	Reference
September 13, 2019	Braver	Smart Araneta Coliseum	Supporting act for Moira Dela Torre	
October 18–19, 2019	Regine Velasquez & Sharon Cuneta: Iconic	Smart Araneta Coliseum	Supporting act/Special guest with Jeremy Glinoga	
November 16–17, 2019	Brian McFadden	Waterfront Hotel Cebu, New Frontier Theater	Supporting act for Brian McFadden	
November 28, 2019	Zephanie at the New Frontier Theater	New Frontier Theater	First major concert	
February 14, 2020	Rachelle Ann Go: The Homecoming	Marriott Grand Ballroom	Supporting act/Special Guest for Rachelle Ann Go	
October 15, 2022	Mr. Music: The Hits of Jonathan Manalo	Newport World Resorts	Supporting act/Special guest	
March 17 to April 1, 2023	Moira Tour 2023	Toronto, Winnipeg, Vancouver and Calgary Canada	Supporting act/Special guest	
July 14, 2023	CS All Star Concert	San Jose, CA	Main Act	
July 15, 2023	CS All Star Concert	Seattle, WA	Main Act	
July 16, 2023	CS All Star Concert	Temecula, CA	Main Act	
June 29, 2024	OST SYMPHONY K-DRAMA IN CONCERT	Metropolitan Theater, Manila	Supporting act/Special guest	
November 8, 2024	CS All Star Concert Canada	Calgary	Main Act	
November 10, 2024	CS All Star Concert Canada	Toronto	Main Act	
September 13, 2025	TJ Monterde Sarili Nating Mundo Concert	Laguna	Surprise Guest	

== Awards and nominations ==
Name of the award ceremony, year presented, category, nominee of the award, and the result of the nomination
Award ceremony	Year	Category	Nominee / Work	Result	Ref.
Aliw Awards	2020	Best New Female Artist	Zephanie	Nominated	
Aliw Awards	2020	Best Pop Artist (Female)	Zephanie	Nominated	
Aliw Awards	2020	Best Female Performance In A Concert	Zephanie	Won	
Aliw Awards	2022	Best Female Pop Artist	Zephanie	Nominated	
Awit Awards	2020	Best Inspirational Recording	Pangarap Kong Pangarap Mo	Nominated	
Awit Awards	2021	Breakthrough Artist	Zephanie	Nominated	
Awit Awards	2021	Favorite Female Artist	Zephanie	Nominated	
Awit Awards	2021	Favorite Song	"Tinadhana Sa'yo"	Nominated	
Awit Awards	2023	Best Original Soundtrack Recording	"Luv Is" (with VXON) - Theme from Luv Is	Nominated	
Himig Handog 11th Edition	2021	MOR Entertainment Choice Award	"Tinadhana Sa'yo"	Won	
Himig Handog 11th Edition	2021	TFC's Global Choice Award	"Tinadhana Sa'yo"	Won	
Idol Philippines	2019	Grand winner	Zephanie	Won	
Idol Philippines I-poll	2019	I-vlog Idol	Zephanie	Won	
Idol Philippines I-poll	2019	Most Iconic Idol	Zephanie	Won	
Idol Philippines I-poll	2019	Most Relatable Idol	Zephanie	Won	
Idol Philippines I-poll	2019	LSS Idol	Zephanie	Won	
Kumu Livestreaming Awards	2021	Singer of the Year	Zephanie	Won	
Myx Music Award	2020	New Artist of the Year	Zephanie	Nominated	
PMPC Star Awards for Music	2021	New Female Recording Artist of the Year	Pangarap Kong Pangarap Mo	Won	
PMPC Star Awards for Music	2021	Revival Recording of the Year	"Bawat Daan"	Nominated	
PMPC Star Awards for Music	2022	Revival Recording of the Year	"Simpleng Tao"	Nominated	
PPOP Awards for Young Artists	2020	Most Favorite Pop Young Performer of the Year	Zephanie	Won	
PPOP Awards for Young Artists	2019	Pop Social Media - Solo Female Artist of the Year	Zephanie	Nominated	
PPOP Awards	2022	Pop Solo Female Artist of the Year	Zephanie	Nominated	
PPOP Awards	2023	PPop Female Soloist of the Year	Zephanie	Nominated	
Push Awards	2019	Push Original Song of the Year	"Pangarap Kong Pangarap Mo"	Nominated	
VP Choice Awards	2024	Promising Female Star of the Year	Zephanie	Nominated	
VP Choice Awards	2025	Promising Female Star of the Year	Zephanie	Nominated	
VP Choice Awards	2026	TV Supporting Actress of the Year	"Mga Batang Riles"	Nominated	

Preceded by First	Idol Philippines; Winner; Season 1 (April 2019–July 2019)	Succeeded by Khimo Gumatay
