= Luv Is =

2023 Philippine television drama series

- Title card
- Genre: Romantic drama
- Directed by: Barry Gonzales; Mark Sicat dela Cruz
- Opening theme: "Luv Is" by VXON and Zephanie
- Country of origin: Philippines
- Original language: Tagalog
- No. of episodes: 75

Production
- Executive producer: Michelle R. Borja
- Cinematography: Cesca Lee
- Camera setup: Multiple-camera setup
- Running time: 23–35 minutes
- Production companies: GMA Entertainment Group; Wattpad Webtoon Studios

Original release
- Network: GMA Network
- Release: January 16 – July 28, 2023

Luv Is is a 2023 Philippine television drama romance anthology series broadcast by GMA Network. It premiered on January 16, 2023 on the network's Telebabad line up. The series concluded on July 28, 2023, with a total of 75 episodes.

The series is streaming online on YouTube.

== Cast and characters ==
=== Caught in His Arms ===
Lead cast

- Sofia Pablo as Florencia "Florence Guinto" Dela Cruz / Celestina Almero
- Allen Ansay as Nero "Sebastian Arante" Ferell

Supporting cast

- Michael Sager as Sean "Owen Yujuico" Ferell
- Raheel Bhyria as Aldus "Raphael Soesanto" Ferell
- Sean Lucas as Troy "Alvis Uytengsu" Ferell
- Vince Maristela as Tristan "Matteo Azcona" Ferell
- Caitlyn Stave as Antonia "Scarlett Valmorida" Fuentes
- Cheska Fausto as Camille Cortez-Villarico
- Kirsten Gonzales as Linnalyn Isabelle "Lina" Tibayen-Hidalgo
- Tanya Ramos as Aira Samson-Rivera
- Ariel Ureta as Garpidio "Garp" Ferell
- Audie Gemora as Rogelio Almero
- Debraliz Valasote as Serafica
- Gio Alvarez as Federico Dela Cruz
- Boom Labrusca as Dencio
- Denise Joaquin as Lydia Dela Cruz
- Rain Matienzo as Ashley Abadiano
- Bobby Andrews as Lorenzo Almero
- Ingrid dela Paz as Alyanna Almero
- Patani Daño as Patutina
- JR Reyes as Iking
- James Marco as James
- Leo Enerio as Baste
- Maritess Joaquin as Amanda
- Dion Ignacio as Samuel Almero

=== Love at First Read ===
Lead cast

- Mavy Legaspi as Kuen Lacrosse "Kudos" Pereseo
- Kyline Alcantara as Angelika Bianca "AB" C. De Makapili

Supporting cast

- Jestoni Alarcon as Hector Pereseo
- Maricar de Mesa as Mayumi "Yumi" Calan-De Makapili
- Jackie Lou Blanco as Gertrude "Truly" Seriozo-Pereseo
- Therese Malvar as Abigail "Gail" Garcia
- Larkin Castor as Shield Rahim-Pereseo
- Bruce Roeland as Risky "Risk" Lennan-Pereseo
- Marco Masa as Dale C. De Makapili
- Josh Ford as Razille Traijin "Train" Zapusumo
- Pam Prinster as Hazel "Vixen" Mayumi / Abigail "Abby" Seriozo
- Mariel Pamintuan as Sandy Bascon
- Kiel Gueco as Psalm Meshach-Pereseo
- Gabby Gueco as Philemon Shadrach-Pereseo

== Ratings ==
According to AGB Nielsen Philippines' Nationwide Urban Television Audience Measurement People in television homes, the pilot episode of Luv Is earned an 8.8% rating.

== Accolades ==
Accolades received by Luv Is
Year	Award	Category	Recipient	Result	Ref.
2025	37th PMPC Star Awards for Television	Best New Male TV Personality	Raheel Bhyria ("Caught in the Arms")	Nominated	
