= Open 24/7 (TV series) =

Philippine television sitcom series

- Title card
- Genre: Sitcom
- Written by: Rhandy Reyes; Lawrence Nicodemus
- Directed by: JR Reyes
- Starring: Vic Sotto; Maja Salvador; Jose Manalo; Sofia Pablo; Allen Ansay
- Music by: Vince Lim
- Country of origin: Philippines
- Original language: Tagalog
- No. of episodes: 52

Production
- Executive producer: Lizzie G. Gatdula
- Producer: Vic Sotto
- Cinematography: Jay Ramirez
- Editor: Vanessa De Leon
- Camera setup: Multiple-camera setup
- Running time: 36–39 minutes
- Production companies: GMA Entertainment Group; M-Zet Productions

Original release
- Network: GMA Network
- Release: May 27, 2023 – May 25, 2024

Open 24/7 is a Philippine television sitcom series broadcast by GMA Network. Directed by JR Reyes, it stars Vic Sotto, Maja Salvador, Jose Manalo, Sofia Pablo, and Allen Ansay. It premiered on May 27, 2023 on the network's Sabado Star Power sa Gabi line up. The series concluded on May 25, 2024, with a total of 52 episodes.

== Premise ==
EZ gets suddenly in charge of the convenience store, Open 24/7. The store was started by his brother who was recently been in an accident. EZ has no choice and needs to run the store by himself.

== Cast and characters ==
Cast

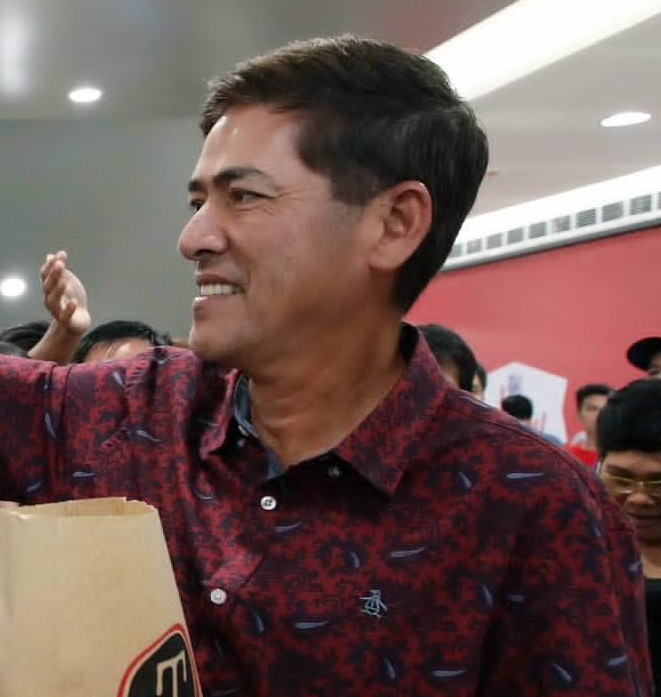
Vic Sotto

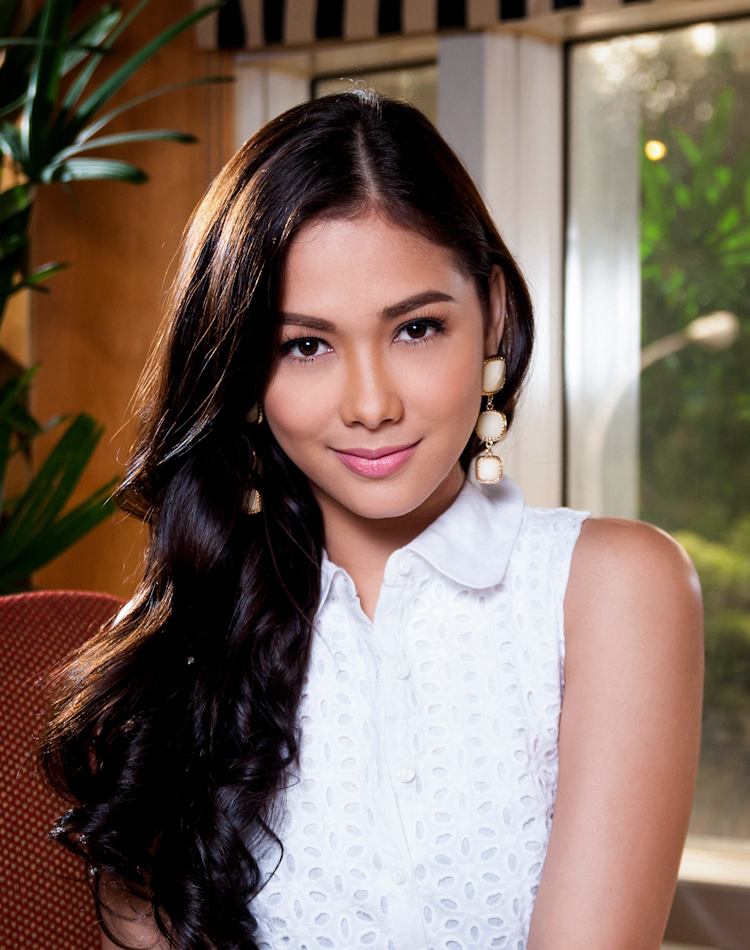
Maja Salvador

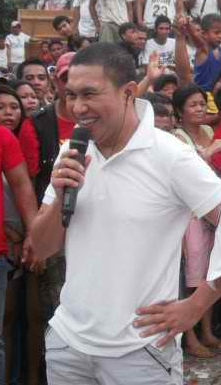
Jose Manalo

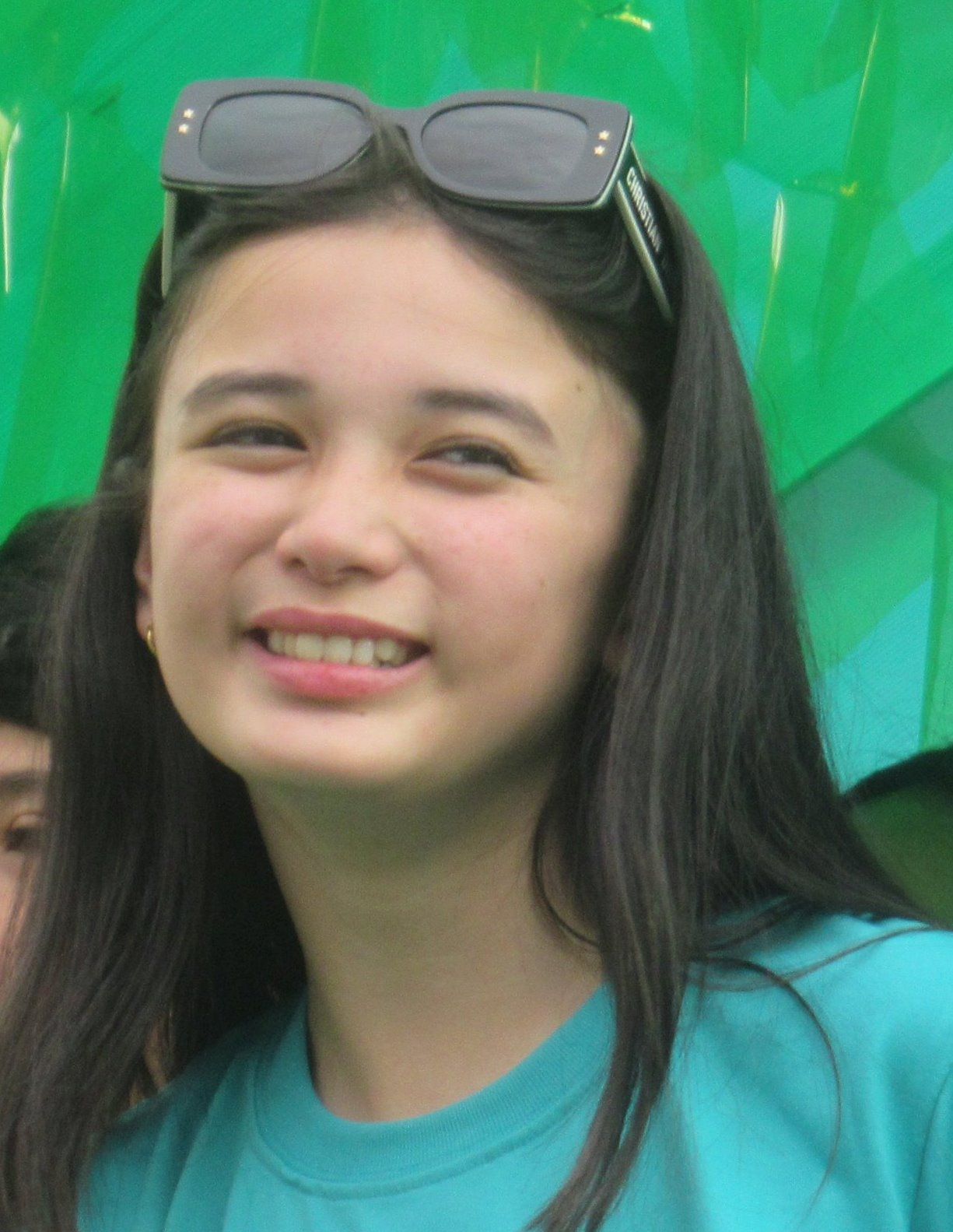
Sofia Pablo

Lead cast

- Vic Sotto as Elvis Zacharus "EZ" Fontanilla
- Maja Salvador as Mikaela/Mike Reselda
- Jose Manalo as Spark Fontanilla
- Sofia Pablo as Kitty "Kikay" Fontanilla
- Allen Ansay as Alexander "Al"

Supporting cast

- Kimson Tan as Kokoy
- Anjay Anson as Andoy
- Bruce Roeland as Doe
- Abed Green as Fred
- Muriel Lomadilla as Rebecca "Bekbek"

Guest cast

- Shaira Diaz as herself
- Rochelle Pangilinan as Konsihala
- Gerhard Acao as a bodyguard
- Tuesday Vargas as Chin-chin
- Ina Feleo as Susan
- John Vic De Guzman as Rico
- Jem Manicad as Dina
- Kakai Bautista as Juana
- Mikee Quintos as Patty
- MJ Lastimosa as Brenda
- Lala Vinzon as Gabriela Salvador
- Donna Cariaga as Piyaya Matriona Grey Bark
- Joel Olivera as Hermes
- Pekto as Pablo
- Prince Carlos as Prince Charming
- Ashley Rivera as Terry
- Empoy Marquez as Jerico
- Madel Palma as Gail
- Sunshine Garcia as Malu
- Pooh as Papu
- Althea Ablan as Mika
- Sanya Lopez as herself
- Matet de Leon as Mia
- Carlo San Juan as Hiro
- Pokwang as Gina
- Matt Lozano as Santa
- John Arcenas as Willy
- Kitkat as O
- Roxie Smith as Pretty Girl
- Jayson Gainza as Manlabo
- Lianne Valentin as Lady
- Yvette Sanchez as Eva
- Maricel Laxa as Margarita
- Mon Confiado as Yu
- Raphael Landicho as Gabgab
- Faye Lorenzo as Che
- Pauline Mendoza as Marina
- Saviour Ramos as Justin
- Candy Pangilinan as Yey
- Ashley Ortega as Kitty
- Ice Seguerra as Alibibe
- Vince Maristela as Felix Santillan
- Denise Barbacena as Daisy

== Ratings ==
According to AGB Nielsen Philippines' Nationwide Urban Television Audience Measurement People in television homes, the pilot episode of Open 24/7 earned an 8.3% rating.
