= Michael Sager =

Filipino-Canadian actor (born 2003)

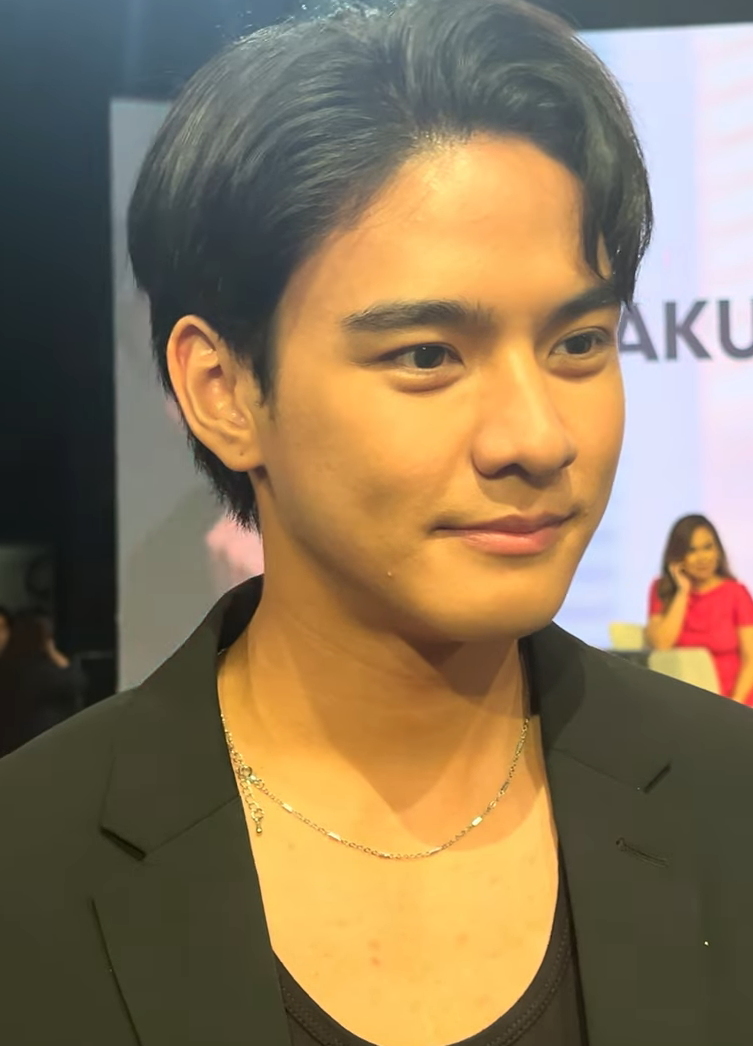
- Sager in December 2023
- Born: Michael Jericho Masangkay Sager; February 5, 2003 (age 23); Gasan, Marinduque, Philippines
- Occupations: Actor; model; singer; host; performer
- Years active: 2022–present
- Agents: Sparkle; Cornerstone
- Height: 180 cm (5 ft 11 in)
- Website: Official website

Michael Jericho Masangkay Sager (born February 5, 2003) is a Filipino-Canadian actor, model, performer, singer and host best known for being as a housemate in Pinoy Big Brother: Celebrity Collab Edition and in his other TV roles, including Shining Inheritance, My Ilonggo Girl and he currently stars opposite Zephanie Dimaranan and Olive May in the musical drama series Born to Shine.

== Early life ==
Michael Sager was born on February 5, 2003, in Gasan, Marinduque, an island province in the Philippines. At 3 years old, he migrated to Canada with his family, where he pursued his studies. At age 16, Sager began working as an ice cream scooper before becoming a sales associate in a store.

== Career ==
=== Early roles ===
Sager's first appearance on live television was as a backup dancer in the Disney Channel film Descendants. He later worked as an extra in productions for Netflix and Nickelodeon.

During the COVID-19 pandemic, Sager attempted to audition for Pinoy Big Brother: Kumunity. Although initially set to audition for the Teen Edition in 2022, he was instead selected as one of 17 artists chosen by talent manager Johnny Manahan to join Sparkada, a youth-oriented group under Sparkle GMA Artist Center. He was formally introduced on the variety program All-Out Sundays.

Sager portrayed Sean in the television series Luv Is: Caught In His Arms. He was later paired with fellow All-Out Sundays cast member Zephanie as part of a love team. Their first project together was #Frenemies, the initial installment of the anthology series Sparkle U. They reprised their roles in the third installment, #SoundTrip.

In July 2023, Sager joined the TAPE Inc. version of the noontime show Eat Bulaga! as a co-host following the departure of its original hosts. Alongside Yasser Marta, Kokoy de Santos, and Kimpoy Feliciano, he became part of the all-male group known as the "Chaleco Boys". The program was later renamed Tahanang Pinakamasaya! after TVJ Productions won a copyright infringement case.

Sager made his film debut in 2023 as Gab in Five Breakups and a Romance, starring Alden Richards and Julia Montes. In 2024, he played a main role in Shining Inheritance, the Philippine adaptation of the South Korean drama Brilliant Legacy. He later appeared in the 2025 mini-series My Ilonggo Girl alongside Jillian Ward.

In March 2025, Sager was announced as part of the initial lineup of housemates for Pinoy Big Brother: Celebrity Collab Edition, where he was given the moniker "Ang Diligent Wonder Son ng Marinduque". He was evicted on Day 49 of the competition together with fellow duo partner Emilio Daez.

In July 2025, Sager appeared in an episode of Rainbow Rumble, which aired on Kapamilya Channel, A2Z, and All TV.

In October 2026, Sager was announced to be the newest host of the third edition of "Pinoy Big Brother: Collab Edition".

== Filmography ==
Key
†	Denotes films that have not yet been released

Film
Year	Title	Role	Notes	Ref.
2015	Descendants	Back-Up dancer		
2023	Five Breakups and a Romance	Calvin Sandoval	Support role	
2025	Opposites Almost Attract	Aster	Lead role	
2026	Huwag Kang Titingin	Benjamin "Benj" Soriano	Support role	

Television
Year	Title	Role	Notes	Ref.
2022–present	All-Out Sundays	Himself	Performer / co-host	
2022	Daig Kayo ng Lola Ko: Tiki TokTok	Kap. Rey	Supporting role	
2022; 2023; 2024–present	TiktoClock	Himself	Guest (2022–2023), co-host (2024–present)	
2022; 2024	Sarap, 'Di Ba?	Himself	Guest	
2022	Daig Kayo ng Lola Ko: Carol Parol	Grant	Supporting role	
2022–2023	Unang Hirit	Himself	Segment host / UH Funliner	
2022–2023	Kapuso Countdown to 2023: Gayo Daejeon	Himself	Performer	
2023	Luv Is: Caught In His Arms	Sean Owen Yujuico Ferell	Supporting role	
2023	Fast Talk with Boy Abunda	Himself	Guest	
2023	Abot-Kamay na Pangarap	Miko de Ocampo	Recurring role	
2023–2024	Eat Bulaga!	Himself	Co-host	
2023	Sparkle U: #Frenemies	Marco Roy Ignacio	Supporting role	
2023–2024	Kapuso Countdown to 2024: The GMA New Year Special	Himself	Performer	
2024	Tahanang Pinakamasaya!	Himself	Co-host	
2024	Sparkle U: #SoundTrip	Marco Roy Ignacio	Main role	
2024	Running Man Philippines	Himself	Guest	
2024	It's Showtime	Himself	Guest	
2024–2025	Shining Inheritance	Euan dela Costa	Main role	
2025	My Ilonggo Girl	Francis Palma	Main role	
2025	Pinoy Big Brother: Celebrity Collab Edition	Himself	Housemate	
2025	Rainbow Rumble	Himself	Contestant	
2025	A Masked Billionaire Stole My Heart	Edward Licauco	Main role	
2026	Born to Shine	Nate Lim	Main role	
2026	Pinoy Big Brother: Collab 3.0	Himself	Online host	

Music video appearances
Year	Title	Artist	Ref.
2022	Luv Is	VXON ft. Zephanie	
2025	Manloloko	Zack Tabudlo	

== Discography ==
Singles
Year	Title	Featured artist	Note	Label	Ref.
2023	"Love Is Us Always and Forever"	Zephanie	GMA Network's Valentines 2023 jingle	GMA Playlist	
2024	"Alam ng Puso Ko"	Kate Valdez	Shining Inheritance OST	GMA Playlist	
2026	"May Gusto Na 'Ko Sa 'Yo		Born to Shine OST	GMA Playlist	

== Accolades ==
Year	Award	Category	Work	Result	Ref.
2023	7th Asia Pacific Luminare Awards	Most Promising and Fast-Rising Young Actor of the Year	Himself	Won	
2025	6th VP Choice Awards	Best TV Actor (Daytime) of the Year	Shining Inheritance	Won	
