= Sparkle U =

Philippine television drama series

- Title card
- Also known as: Sparkle University
- Genre: Drama
- Created by: Dode Cruz
- Written by: J-mee Katanyag; Mikee Ladera; Meryl Bunyi; Louize Al-Shehri; Mark Duane Angos; Patrick Ilagan; Renei Dimla
- Directed by: Barry Gonzales; Ralfh Manuel Malabunga
- Creative director: Aloy Adlawan
- Country of origin: Philippines
- Original language: Tagalog
- No. of episodes: 18

Production
- Executive producers: Kaye Cadsawan; Erwin Hilado
- Camera setup: Multiple-camera setup
- Running time: 28–32 minutes
- Production company: GMA Entertainment Group

Original release
- Network: GMA Network
- Release: October 1, 2023 – January 28, 2024

Sparkle U (also known as Sparkle University) is a Philippine television drama anthology series broadcast by GMA Network. It premiered on October 1, 2023 on the network's Sunday Grande sa Gabi line up. The series concluded on January 28, 2024, with a total of 18 episodes.

The series is streaming online on YouTube.

== Cast and characters ==
#Frenemies

- Shayne Sava as Rebecca "Bekang" de Dios
- Roxie Smith as Yazmine "Yazzi" Martinez
- Abdul Raman as Juan Enrique "Drake" dela Rosa III
- Zephanie as Susanne "Sue" Gara
- Michael Sager as Marco Roy Ignacio
- Anjay Anson as Wado
- Lauren King as Yarah Emmanuel
- Vanessa Peña as Yamine "Yam" Agustin
- Princess Aliyah as Raeka dela Rosa
- Matt Lozano as Basti
- Liza Lorena as Aling Matilda "Tindeng" de Dios
- Leandro Baldemor as Rebecco "Reb" de Dios
- Sue Prado as Zarah Martinez
- Geleen Eugenio as Miranda Ignacio
- Jelai Andres as Claris Lucas
- Rain Matienzo as Jen Z

#Ghosted

- Sofia Pablo as Alessi / Liane Gaspar
- Allen Ansay as Zac
- Marco Masa as Leon
- Liana Mae as Sela
- Princess Aliyah as Raeka dela Rosa
- Rufa Mae Quinto as Agnes Gaspar
- Archie Alemania as Dexter
- Debraliz as Mother Sister
- Gio Alvarez as Liam
- Rain Matienzo as Jen Z

#SoundTrip

- Zephanie as Susanne "Sue" Gara
- Michael Sager as Marco Roy Ignacio
- Althea Ablan as Alyssa Mae Geronimo
- Matthew Uy as Ethan Santiago
- Vanessa Peña as Yamine "Yam" Agustin
- Lauren King as Yarah Emmanuel
- Gaea Mischa as Sharifa Cabrido
- Gilleth Sandico as Maya Rivera
- Marlon Mance as Donald Geronimo
- Geleen Eugenio as Miranda Ignacio
- Fredmoore de los Santos as Efren Gara
- Rain Matienzo as Jen Z

== Accolades ==
Accolades received by Sparkle U
Year	Awards	Category	Recipient	Result	Ref.
2025	36th PMPC Star Awards for Television	Best Mini Series	Sparkle U	Pending	
