= Prinsesa ng City Jail =

2025 Philippine television drama series

- Title card
- Also known as: The Jailhouse Princess
- Genre: Drama
- Written by: Kenneth de Leon; Renato Custodia Jr.; Mark Duane Angos
- Directed by: Jerry Lopez Sineneng
- Creative director: Aloy Adlawan
- Starring: Sofia Pablo
- Music by: Marvin Chua
- Opening theme: "Ganito Ako Babangon" by Zephanie
- Country of origin: Philippines
- Original language: Tagalog
- No. of episodes: 129

Production
- Executive producer: Darling Pulido-Torres
- Cinematography: Rico Jacinto
- Editors: Jennalyn Sablaya; Debbie Robete; Roslany Barodi; Jerome Dispo; Mark Lazatin
- Camera setup: Multiple-camera setup
- Running time: 22–30 minutes
- Production company: GMA Entertainment Group

Original release
- Network: GMA Network
- Release: January 13 – June 21, 2025

Prinsesa ng City Jail (transl. princess of city jail / international title: The Jailhouse Princess) is a 2025 Philippine television drama series broadcast by GMA Network. Directed by Jerry Lopez Sineneng, it stars Sofia Pablo in the title role. It premiered on January 13, 2025 on the network's Afternoon Prime line up. The series concluded on June 21, 2025, with a total of 129 episodes.

The series is streaming online on YouTube.

== Premise ==
Princess grows up inside a prison due to her father working as a jail guard. Despite her "unusual" upbringing, she brings hope and inspiration for the inmates. As she helps bring light into their lives, she embarks on her own journey to find her missing mother.

== Cast and characters ==
Cast

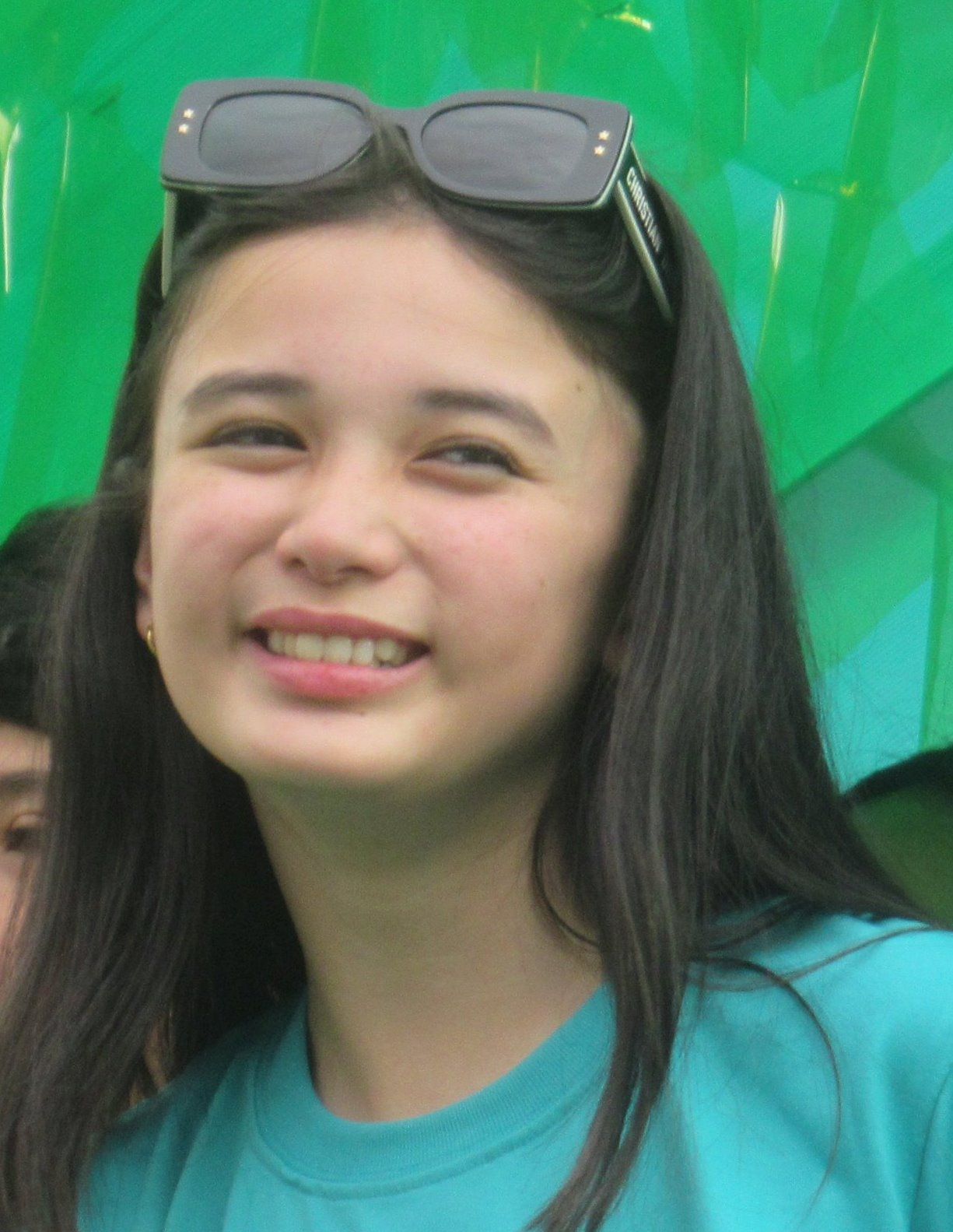
Sofia Pablo

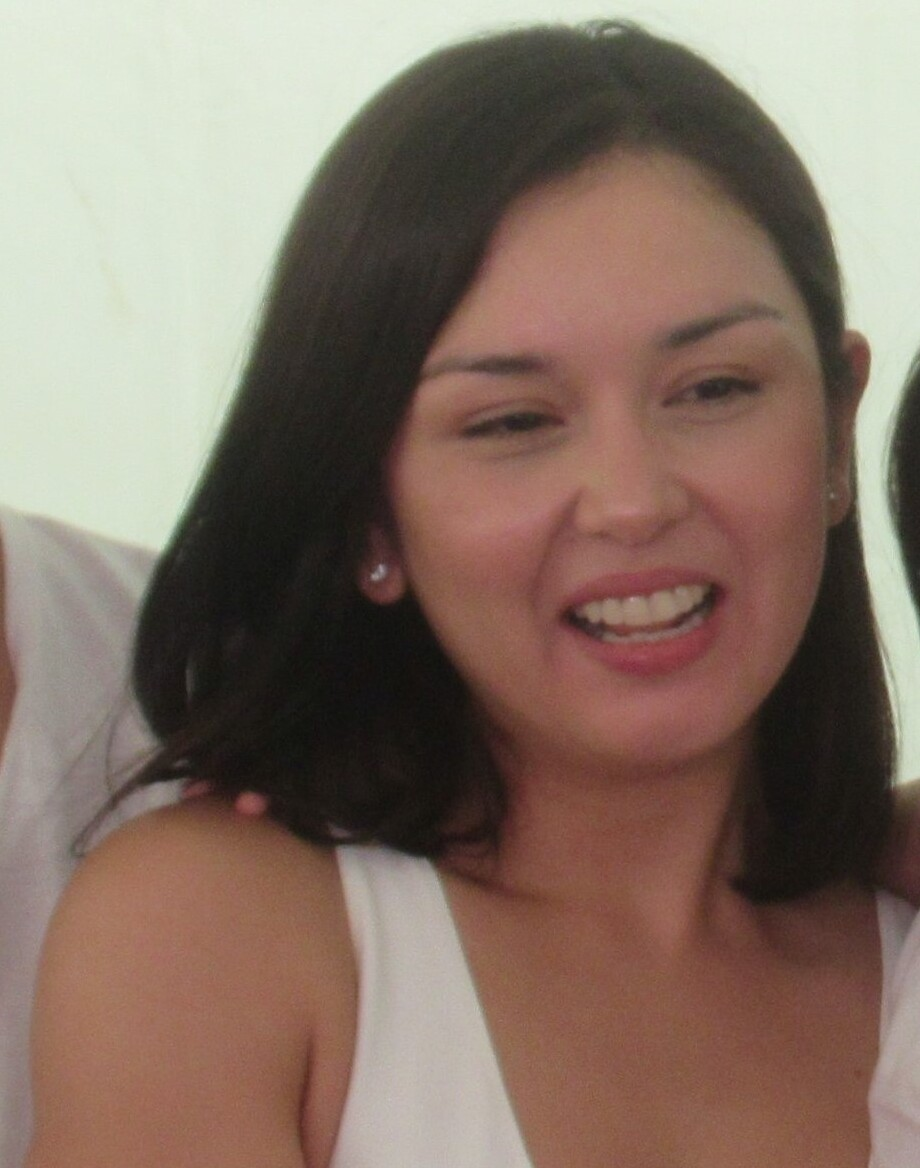
Beauty Gonzalez

Lead cast

- Sofia Pablo as Princess Pascual / Princess Torres-Cristobal

Supporting cast

- Allen Ansay as Xavier Bustamante
- Beauty Gonzalez as Sharlene Torres-Cristobal
- Pauline Mendoza as Mimi Sanchez
- Denise Laurel as Divina Williams
- Dominic Ochoa as Raymond Cristobal
- Ayen Munji-Laurel as Leilani Bustamante
- Keempee de Leon as Dado Pascual
- Jean Saburit as Sonya Cristobal
- Ina Feleo as Jenny Vivero
- Will Ashley as Onse Rivera
- Radson Flores as Justin Lozano
- Lauren King as Liberty "Libby" Cristobal
- Betong Sumaya as Policarpio "Pusoy" Vivero
- Tanya Ramos as Ava Torres
- Jett Pangan as Benhur Torres-Cristobal
- Cheska Fausto as Bernice Pascual
- Prince Clemente as Hyro Rivera

Guest cast

- Sienna Stevens as younger Princess

== Production ==
Principal photography commenced in April 2024.

== Ratings ==
According to AGB Nielsen Philippines' Nationwide Urban Television Audience Measurement People in television homes, the pilot episode of Prinsesa ng City Jail earned a 7.2% rating. The final episode scored a 7% rating.
