= Apoy sa Langit =

2022 Philippine television drama series

- Title card
- Also known as: Broken Promise
- Genre: Drama
- Created by: Liberty Trinidad-Villaroman
- Written by: J-Mee Katanyag; Liberty Trinidad-Villaroman; Brylle Tabora; Carlo Ventura; Cynthia Paz
- Directed by: Laurice Guillen
- Creative director: Aloy Adlawan
- Starring: Maricel Laxa
- Theme music composer: Natasha L. Correos
- Opening theme: "Tunay na Minamahal" by Zephanie Dimaranan
- Country of origin: Philippines
- Original language: Tagalog
- No. of episodes: 105

Production
- Executive producer: Erwin Manzano Hilado
- Camera setup: Multiple-camera setup
- Running time: 22–28 minutes
- Production company: GMA Entertainment Group

Original release
- Network: GMA Network
- Release: May 2 – September 3, 2022

Apoy sa Langit (transl. fire on heaven / international title: Broken Promise) is a 2022 Philippine television drama series broadcast by GMA Network. Directed by Laurice Guillen, it stars Maricel Laxa. It premiered on May 2, 2022 on the network's Afternoon Prime and Sabado Star Power sa Hapon line up. The series concluded on September 3, 2022, with a total of 105 episodes.

The series is streaming online on YouTube.

== Cast and characters ==
Lead cast

- Maricel Laxa as Gemma Monastrial / Gemma Hidalgo

Supporting cast

- Zoren Legaspi as Cesar Monastrial
- Mikee Quintos as Luningning "Ning" Hidalgo
- Lianne Valentin as Stella Fernandez / Stella Monastrial
- Mariz Ricketts as Blessie Atienza
- Carlos Siguion-Reyna as Edong Tayag
- Dave Bornea as Anthony "Tony" Zulueta
- Coleen Paz as Patring Benepayo
- Celine Fajardo as Iyah Legarda
- Patricia Ismael as Lucy Fuerte
- Mio Maranan as Toto Pancho

Guest cast

- Ramon Christopher as Rey Hidalgo
- Jen Rosendahl as Rona de Leon

== Production ==
Principal photography commenced on March 20, 2022.

== Ratings ==
According to AGB Nielsen Philippines' Nationwide Urban Television Audience Measurement People in television homes, the pilot episode of Apoy sa Langit earned a 5.1% rating. The final episode scored a 10% rating.
