= Raya Sirena =

2022 Philippine television drama series

- Title card
- Genre: Drama; Romantic fantasy
- Directed by: Crisanto Aquino
- Starring: Sofia Pablo
- Country of origin: Philippines
- Original language: Tagalog
- No. of episodes: 7

Production
- Camera setup: Multiple-camera setup
- Production companies: GMA Entertainment Group; Regal Entertainment

Original release
- Network: GMA Network
- Release: April 24 – June 5, 2022

Raya Sirena (transl. Raya mermaid) is a 2022 Philippine television drama romantic fantasy series broadcast by GMA Network. Directed by Cristano Aquino, it stars Sofia Pablo in the title role. It premiered on April 24, 2022 on the network's Sunday Grande sa Hapon line up. The series concluded on June 5, 2022, with a total of seven episodes.

The series is streaming online on YouTube.

== Cast and characters ==
Lead cast

- Sofia Pablo as Raya

Supporting cast

- Allen Ansay as Gavin
- Savior Ramos as Ape
- Shirley Fuentes as Helga
- Mosang as Matet
- Gerald Pesigan as Buknoy
- Shecko Apostol as Poknat
- Jana Francine Taladro as Thea
- Ayeesha Cervantes as Chriselle
- Mika Reins as Lua
- Juan Carlos Galano as Bulan
- Elias Point as Otep
- Roberta Daleon as Martina
- Ralph Ernest Francia as Roman

Guest cast

- Bernadette Allyson as Elena

== Ratings ==
According to AGB Nielsen Philippines' Nationwide Urban Television Audience Measurement People in television homes, the pilot episode of Raya Sirena earned a 3.5% rating.
