= Allen Ansay =

Filipino actor, model, and singer (born 2003)

- Born: Allen Michael Bono Ansay; November 23, 2003 (age 22); Sagñay, Camarines Sur, Philippines
- Occupations: Actor; Model; Vlogger; Singer
- Years active: 2019–present
- Agent: Sparkle GMA Artist Center (2019–present)
- Height: 1.86 m (6 ft 1 in)

Allen Michael Bono Ansay (born November 23, 2003) is a Filipino actor, model, and singer. He was born in Sagñay, Camarines Sur, Philippines. Ansay rose to fame in 2019 when he joined the reality show StarStruck where he was proclaimed runner-up to Kim De Leon.

He is known for his role as Fonzie in the television series Prima Donnas, and has appeared in the drama anthology Magpakailanman.

In 2023, Ansay played the role of Nero Sebastian Ferell in the television series Luv Is: Caught in His Arms. He was also awarded at the 6th Philippine Empowered Men & Women of the Year 2023 along with other Sparkle stars such as Sofia Pablo, Will Ashley, and Jeff Moses.

== Early life ==
Ansay was born on November 23, 2003 and raised in Sagñay, Camarines Sur. He studied for communication degree along actress Sofia Pablo at UST Angelicum College.

== Career ==
After winning the reality show StarStruck in 2019, Ansay quickly established himself as a prominent figure in the Philippine entertainment industry, thanks in large part to his talent manager. His dynamic dancing abilities captivated audiences during numerous performances across the country, showcasing his versatility and passion for the art. One of the significant milestones in his early career was his appearance on the popular Sunday variety show All-Out Sundays, where he not only entertained viewers but also solidified his status as a budding star.

In 2021, Ansay took a significant step forward in his acting career by landing the leading role of Gavin in the Regal Studio Presents: Raya Sirena. This project marked an important transition from his beginnings as a dancer to becoming a well-rounded performer.

In 2022, Ansay expanded his acting repertoire even further, taking on the role of Alfonso "Fonsie" Serrano in the afternoon drama series Prima Donnas with Jillian Ward, he was able to engage with a younger audience while also appealing to drama enthusiasts. Additionally, he reprised his role as Gavin in the Sunday drama series in Raya Sirena.

In 2023, Ansay returns to prime-time television, where he took on the played the role of Nero Sebastian Ferell in the highly anticipated series Luv Is: Caught in His Arms. Alexander "Al" played the role of Open 24/7, which was topbilled by his love team Sofia Pablo but also featured an impressive cast including established actors such as Vic Sotto and Maja Salvador.

In 2024, Ansay will be seen leading the role of John-John in the miniseries Ok Ako. This new venture promises to further elevate his career as he continues to take on diverse roles that challenge his abilities.

== Personal life ==
From 2020 to 2026, He was in a relationship with fellow actress Sofia Pablo.

== Filmography ==
=== Film ===
Year	Title	Role	Ref.
2026	Huwag Kang Titingin	Brent "Badong" Antonio	

=== Television ===
Year	Title	Role
2019	StarStruck (season 7)	Himself
2019	Sarap, 'Di Ba?	Himself
2019	Magpakailanman: StarStruck Ultimate Survivors	Himself
2020–present	All-Out Sundays	Himself / Guest (2020); Mainstay / Performer / Co-Host (since 2021)
2020	Magpakailanman: A Mother's Faith	JP
2020	Maynila: Crush Me	Anthony
2021	Magpakailanman: Rebeldeng Anak, Ulirang Ina	Matt
2021	Regal Studio Presents: Raya Sirena	Gavin
2021	Mars Pa More	Himself
2022	Prima Donnas	Alfonso "Fonsie" Serrano
2022	Regal Studio Presents: My Cheesy Cutie Guy	Lucky
2022	Raya Sirena	Gavin
2022	iBilib	Himself / Guest
2022	The Boobay and Tekla Show	Himself / Guest
2022	Regal Studio Presents: Mind the Gap	Ian
2022	Tadhana: Hanggang Kailan	Jacob
2022	Regal Studio Presents: I Like You 'Tol	Marco
2022	Daig Kayo ng Lola Ko: Carol Parol	Aaron
2022	TiktoClock	Himself / Guest
2023	Luv Is: Caught in His Arms	Nero Sebastian Arante Ferell
2023	Fast Talk with Boy Abunda	Himself / Guest
2023	Regal Studio Presents: Last Love	Basti
2023	Regal Studio Presents: The Ghosting	Anton
2023–2024	Open 24/7	Alexander "Al"
2023	Amazing Earth	Himself / Guest
2023	Daig Kayo ng Lola Ko: Be the Bes	Pip
2023	Sparkle U: #Ghosted	Zac
2024	Regal Studio Presents: Hating Kapatid	Jun
2024	Regal Studio Presents: Queer Brother	Potchi
2024	Ok Ako	John-john
2025	Prinsesa ng City Jail	Xavier Bustamante
2025	It's Showtime	Himself / Guest / Performer
2025	Regal Studio Presents: Dikit-dikit, Langit-langit	Mik-mik
2025	Sanggang-Dikit FR	Allen Matibag
2026–present	Pinoy Big Brother: Collab 3.0	Housemate

=== Online series ===
Year	Title	Role	Ref.
2023	In My Dreams	Jecoy	

== Accolades ==
Year	Award	Category	Result	Ref.
2023	6th Philippine Empowered Men & Women of the Year 2023	Empowered Teen Star – Loveteam of the Year (with Sofia Pablo)	Won	
2023	Global Trends Business Leaders Awards 2023	Most Promising Loveteam of the Year (with Sofia Pablo)	Won	

== See also ==
- Sofia Pablo
