= Pangarap Kong Pangarap Mo =

Single by Zephanie
- Language: Tagalog
- English title: "My Dream That Is Your Dream"
- Released: July 29, 2019
- Recorded: 2019
- Genre: Pop
- Length: 2:54
- Label: Star Music
- Composer(s): Jonathan Manalo
- Producer(s): Jonathan Manalo

"Pangarap Kong Pangarap Mo" (transl. My Dream That Is Your Dream) is the debut single by Filipino singer Zephanie. The song was written and produced by Jonathan Manalo.

== Background ==
The song was written and produced by Jonathan Manalo as Zephanie Dimaranan's original song in the second round of the finale of the first season of Idol Philippines. After performing the song and Ted Ito's Maghintay Ka Lamang in the finale night, Dimaranan received 100 percent of score in terms of judges scores and public votes winning the Idol Philippines title and beating Lucas Garcia of Lipa City, Batangas garnering 70.2 percent and Lance Busa of Butuan, Agusan del Norte garnering 41.89 percent. With that, she received ₱2,000,000 cash prize, along with an all-expense trip to Taiwan, a house and lot from Camella Homes, and a contract with Star Music.

== Track listing ==
Digital download
No.	Title	Length
1.	"Pangarap Kong Pangarap Mo"	2:54
