= Kamao (TV series) =

2026 Philippine television drama series

- Title card
- Also known as: In His Corner
- Genre: Sports drama
- Directed by: L.A. Madridejos; Richard Arellano
- Starring: Anton Vinzon
- Country of origin: Philippines
- Original language: Tagalog
- No. of episodes: 104

Production
- Camera setup: Multiple-camera setup
- Production company: GMA Entertainment Group

Original release
- Network: GMA Network
- Release: May 25 – October 16, 2026

Kamao (transl. fist / international title: In His Corner) is a 2026 Philippine television drama sports series broadcast by GMA Network. Directed by L.A. Madridejos and Richard Arellano, it stars Anton Vinzon in the title role. It premiered on May 25, 2026, on the network's Afternoon Prime line up. The series concluded on October 16, 2026, with a total of 104 episodes.

The series is streaming online on YouTube.

== Premise ==
Makmak is a boxer who aspires of becoming a champion. His battles happen outside the ring. He gets caught up in the lies and controversies surrounding his former boxing champ father and endures the rules of his grandfather.

== Cast and characters ==
Cast

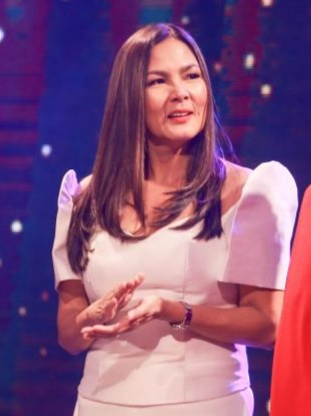
Amy Austria

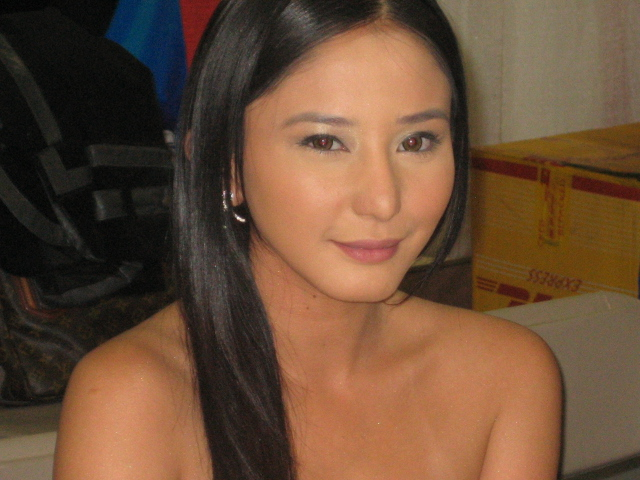
Katrina Halili

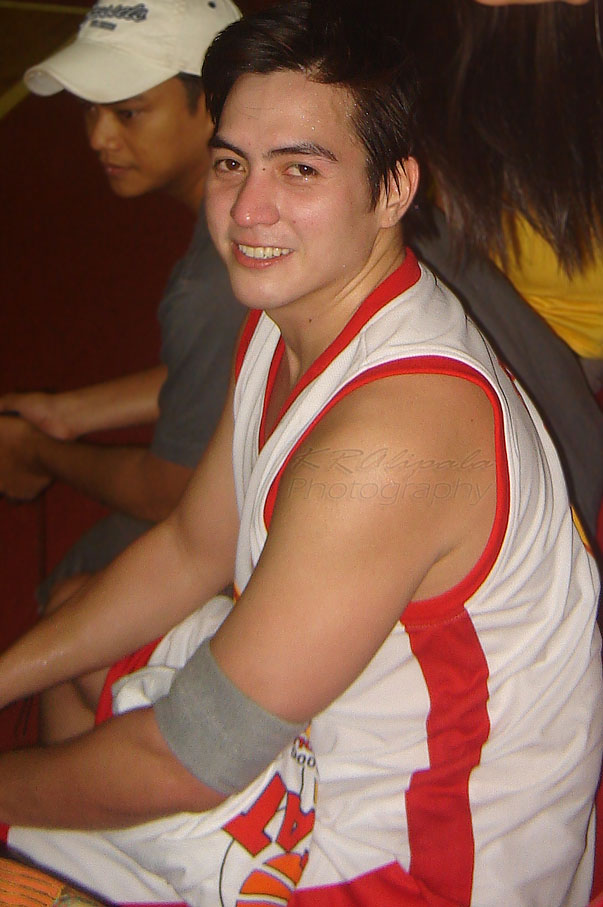
Wendell Ramos

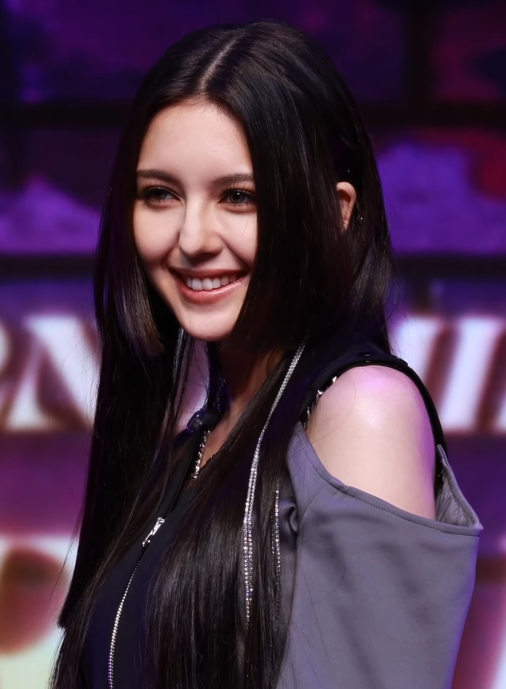
Chanty Videla

Lead cast

- Anton Vinzon as Makmak

Supporting cast

- Amy Austria as Gloria
- Roi Vinzon
- Neil Ryan Sese
- Katrina Halili as Nadia Batumbacal
- Wendell Ramos
- Bruce Roeland
- Therese Malvar
- Chanty Videla
- Matt Lozano
- David "Abdul" Domanais
- Christian "Marsy" Kimp Atip

Guest cast

- Euwenn Mikaell
- Zephanie Dimaranan as Jeni Sicat
- Raheel Bhyria as Julian "Matador" Gonzales
- Rafael Rosell as Marco “Pretty Boy” Velez

== Development ==
The series and its cast members were announced in March 2026. Vinzon trained in boxing, in preparation for his role. In July 2026, actress Zephanie Dimaranan made an appearance as Jeni Sicat, who originated from the Philippine television musical drama series Born to Shine.

== Ratings ==
According to AGB Nielsen Philippines' Nationwide Urban Television Audience Measurement People in television homes, the pilot episode of Kamao earned a 5.4% rating. The final episode scored a 4.5% rating.

== Legacy ==
In July 2026, actor Anton Vinzon and actress Therese Malvar appeared in the 2026 Philippine television musical drama series, Born to Shine.
