= Huwag Kang Titingin =

2026 horror film by Frasco Mortiz

- Theatrical release poster
- Directed by: Frasco Mortiz
- Screenplay by: Ays De Guzman
- Produced by: Nessa S. Valdellon
- Starring: Sofia Pablo; Allen Ansay; Marco Masa; Kira Balinger; Michael Sager
- Cinematography: Dom Dycaico
- Edited by: Noah Tonga; Mark Jayson Sucgang
- Music by: Francis de Veyra
- Production companies: GMA Pictures; Mentorque Productions
- Distributed by: GMA Pictures
- Release date: April 15, 2026
- Country: Philippines
- Language: Filipino

Huwag Kang Titingin (transl. Don't Look) is a 2026 Philippine horror film directed by Frasco Mortiz. The film stars Sofia Pablo, Allen Ansay, Marco Masa, Kira Balinger, and Michael Sager.

A co-production of GMA Pictures and Mentorque Productions, the film was theatrically released in cinemas on April 15, 2026.

== Premise ==
A group of friends triggers a supernatural curse through a social media trend. This involves a number of ancient, sinister forces tied to local myths.

== Cast ==
- Sofia Pablo as Selene Ramirez
- Allen Ansay as Brent "Badong" Antonio
- Marco Masa as Brian Alfreta
- Michael Sager as Benjamin "Benj" Soriano
- Sean Lucas as Seth "A-Jay" Alfreta
- Kira Balinger as Liza Bustamante
- Josh Ford as Calvin "Onat" Angeles
- Anthony Constantino as Miggy "Migz" Quirante
- Charlie Fleming as Kira Morena
- Shuvee Etrata as Diane Alfreta
- Sherilyn Reyes as Letty

== Production ==
=== Development ===
The film marks the first collaboration between GMA Pictures and Mentorque Productions.

=== Filming ===
The director, Frasco Mortiz, stated that the film was inspired by Final Destination Bloodlines. Filming was scheduled to begin in September 2025. The production planned to shoot the entire movie in Batangas.
