= GMA Entertainment Group =

Entertainment division of GMA Network Inc.

- Logo used since 2018
- Formerly: GMA Entertainment TV (2001–2017); GMA Entertainment Content Group (2017–2018)
- Type: Division
- Industry: Television; Film; Broadcast syndication; Distribution
- Predecessor: RBS/GMA Entertainment Department
- Founded: March 26, 2001; 25 years ago
- Headquarters: GMA Network Center, EDSA corner Timog Avenue, Diliman, Quezon City, Metro Manila, Philippines
- Area served: Worldwide
- Key people: Cheryl Ching-Sy (Officer-In-Charge for Entertainment Group and Vice President for Business Development Department 1 (Drama)); Janine Piad-Nacar (Vice President for Business Development Department 2 (Comedy/Infotainment/Game/Reality Productions)); Girly "Gigi" Santiago-Lara (Vice President for Business Development Department 3 (Talk/Magazine/Musical Variety/Specials/Alternative Productions)); Ali Marie N. Dedicatoria (Senior Assistant Vice President, BDD1); Helen Rose S. Sese (Assistant Vice President, BDD1); Enrilyn T. Calaycay (Assistant Vice President, BDD2); Ruth Roxanne S. Mariñas (Assistant Vice President, BDD3)
- Products: Television programs; Motion pictures; Live events; Concert tours
- Services: Television production; Film production; Film promotion; Concert production
- Parent: GMA Network Inc.
- Website: gmanetwork.com/entertainment

GMA Entertainment Group (formerly GMA Entertainment TV and GMA Entertainment Content Group) is a Philippine television, film, event production and distribution company owned by GMA Network Inc. It was founded on March 26, 2001, with Ikaw Lang ang Mamahalin as its first program.

Since 2025, the division is currently headed by its officer-in-charge Cheryl Ching-Sy.

== Production works ==
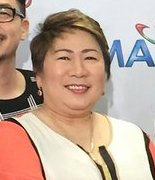
Lilybeth G. Rasonable served as the head of division.

=== Drama ===
==== Anthology ====
Year	Title	Network	Notes
2001	Larawan: A Special Drama Engagement	GMA Network	—N/a
2002–present	Magpakailanman	GMA Network	—N/a
2003–2006	Love to Love	GMA Network	—N/a
2005–2007	Ang Mahiwagang Baul	GMA Network	—N/a
2007	Magic Kamison	GMA Network	—N/a
2007	Mga Kuwento ni Lola Basyang	GMA Network	—N/a
2008	Obra	GMA Network	—N/a
2008–2010	Dear Friend	GMA Network	—N/a
2009	SRO Cinemaserye	GMA Network	—N/a
2010	Claudine	GMA Network	—N/a
2010	Love Bug	GMA Network	—N/a
2011–2012	Spooky Nights	GMA Network	—N/a
2012	Spooky Valentine	GMA Network	—N/a
2013	One Day Isang Araw	GMA Network	—N/a
2014	Seasons of Love	GMA Network	—N/a
2016	URL: Usapang Real Love	GMA Network	—N/a
2017	Case Solved	GMA Network	—N/a
2017–2019	Stories for the Soul	GMA Network	—N/a
2020–2022	I Can See You	GMA Network	—N/a
2021–2022	Stories from the Heart	GMA Network	—N/a
2023	Luv Is	GMA Network	co-production with Wattpad Webtoon Studios
2023–2024	Sparkle U	GMA Network	—N/a

==== Series ====
Year	Title	Network	Notes
2001	Ikaw Lang ang Mamahalin	GMA Network	—N/a
2001	Sa Dako Pa Roon	GMA Network	—N/a
2001	Sana ay Ikaw na Nga	GMA Network	—N/a
2001–2004	Click	GMA Network	—N/a
2002	Kung Mawawala Ka	GMA Network	—N/a
2002	Kahit Kailan	GMA Network	—N/a
2002	Ang Iibigin ay Ikaw	GMA Network	—N/a
2002	Habang Kapiling Ka	GMA Network	—N/a
2003	Ang Iibigin ay Ikaw Pa Rin	GMA Network	—N/a
2003	Narito ang Puso Ko	GMA Network	—N/a
2003	Twin Hearts	GMA Network	—N/a
2004	Te Amo, Maging Sino Ka Man	GMA Network	—N/a
2004	Hanggang Kailan	GMA Network	—N/a
2004	Marinara	GMA Network	—N/a
2004	Mulawin	GMA Network	—N/a
2004	Joyride	GMA Network	—N/a
2004	Forever in My Heart	GMA Network	—N/a
2005	Darna	GMA Network	—N/a
2005	Encantadia	GMA Network	—N/a
2005	Sugo	GMA Network	—N/a
2005	Kung Mamahalin Mo Lang Ako	GMA Network	—N/a
2005	My Guardian Abby	QTV	co-production with Telefe
2005	Etheria: Ang Ikalimang Kaharian ng Encantadia	GMA Network	—N/a
2006	Encantadia: Pag-ibig Hanggang Wakas	GMA Network	—N/a
2006	Majika	GMA Network	—N/a
2006	Noel	QTV	—N/a
2006	Fantastikids	GMA Network	—N/a
2006	I Luv NY	GMA Network	—N/a
2006	Captain Barbell	GMA Network	—N/a
2006	Posh	QTV	co-production with Viva Television
2006	Pinakamamahal	GMA Network	—N/a
2006	Bakekang	GMA Network	—N/a
2006	Atlantika	GMA Network	—N/a
2007	Asian Treasures	GMA Network	—N/a
2007	Princess Charming	GMA Network	—N/a
2007	Super Twins	GMA Network	—N/a
2007	Muli	GMA Network; TV1	co-production with RTM and Cre-Asian Productions
2007	Lupin	GMA Network	—N/a
2007	Fantastic Man	GMA Network	—N/a
2007	Sinasamba Kita	GMA Network	—N/a
2007	Pati Ba Pintig ng Puso	GMA Network	—N/a
2007	Impostora	GMA Network	—N/a
2007	Mga Mata ni Anghelita	GMA Network	—N/a
2007	Kung Mahawi Man ang Ulap	GMA Network	—N/a
2007	MariMar	GMA Network	—N/a
2007	Pasan Ko ang Daigdig	GMA Network	—N/a
2007	Zaido: Pulis Pangkalawakan	GMA Network	—N/a
2007	La Vendetta	GMA Network	—N/a
2007	My Only Love	GMA Network	—N/a
2007	Kamandag	GMA Network	—N/a
2008	Maging Akin Ka Lamang	GMA Network	—N/a
2008	E.S.P.	GMA Network	—N/a
2008	Joaquin Bordado	GMA Network	—N/a
2008	Kaputol ng Isang Awit	GMA Network	—N/a
2008	Babangon Ako't Dudurugin Kita	GMA Network	—N/a
2008	Tasya Fantasya	GMA Network	—N/a
2008	Dyesebel	GMA Network	—N/a
2008	Magdusa Ka	GMA Network	—N/a
2008	Gaano Kadalas ang Minsan	GMA Network	—N/a
2008	Ako si Kim Samsoon	GMA Network	—N/a
2008	Codename: Asero	GMA Network	—N/a
2008	Una Kang Naging Akin	GMA Network	—N/a
2008	LaLola	GMA Network	—N/a
2008	Gagambino	GMA Network	—N/a
2008	Saan Darating ang Umaga?	GMA Network	—N/a
2008	Luna Mystika	GMA Network	—N/a
2009	Ang Babaeng Hinugot sa Aking Tadyang	GMA Network	—N/a
2009	Paano Ba ang Mangarap?	GMA Network	—N/a
2009	Totoy Bato	GMA Network	—N/a
2009	Dapat Ka Bang Mahalin?	GMA Network	—N/a
2009	Zorro	GMA Network	—N/a
2009	Ngayon at Kailanman	GMA Network	—N/a
2009	Adik Sa'Yo	GMA Network	—N/a
2009	Kung Aagawin Mo ang Lahat sa Akin	GMA Network	—N/a
2009	All My Life	GMA Network	—N/a
2009	Rosalinda	GMA Network	—N/a
2009	Darna	GMA Network	—N/a
2009	Stairway to Heaven	GMA Network	—N/a
2009	Ikaw Sana	GMA Network	—N/a
2009	Kaya Kong Abutin ang Langit	GMA Network	—N/a
2009	Tinik sa Dibdib	GMA Network	—N/a
2009	Sana Ngayong Pasko	GMA Network	—N/a
2010	The Last Prince	GMA Network	—N/a
2010	Ina, Kasusuklaman Ba Kita?	GMA Network	—N/a
2010	Gumapang Ka sa Lusak	GMA Network	—N/a
2010	First Time	GMA Network	—N/a
2010	Panday Kids	GMA Network	—N/a
2010	Diva	GMA Network	—N/a
2010	Basahang Ginto	GMA Network	—N/a
2010	Langit sa Piling Mo	GMA Network	—N/a
2010	Pilyang Kerubin	GMA Network	—N/a
2010	Trudis Liit	GMA Network	—N/a
2010	Endless Love	GMA Network	—N/a
2010	Ilumina	GMA Network	—N/a
2010	Grazilda	GMA Network	—N/a
2010	Bantatay	GMA Network	—N/a
2010	Reel Love Presents Tween Hearts	GMA Network	—N/a
2010	Koreana	GMA Network	—N/a
2010	Jillian: Namamasko Po	GMA Network	—N/a
2010	Beauty Queen	GMA Network	—N/a
2011	Dwarfina	GMA Network	—N/a
2011	Alakdana	GMA Network	—N/a
2011	Machete	GMA Network	—N/a
2011	I ♥ You, Pare!	GMA Network	—N/a
2011	Nita Negrita	GMA Network	—N/a
2011	My Lover, My Wife	GMA Network	—N/a
2011	Magic Palayok	GMA Network	—N/a
2011	Captain Barbell: Ang Pagbabalik	GMA Network	—N/a
2011	Munting Heredera	GMA Network	—N/a
2011	Blusang Itim	GMA Network	—N/a
2011	Sisid	GMA Network	—N/a
2011	Amaya	GMA Network	—N/a
2011	Sinner or Saint	GMA Network	—N/a
2011	Futbolilits	GMA Network	—N/a
2011	Mistaken Identity	GMA Network	—N/a
2011	Time of My Life	GMA Network	—N/a
2011	Pahiram ng Isang Ina	GMA Network	—N/a
2011	Iglot	GMA Network	—N/a
2011	Kung Aagawin Mo ang Langit	GMA Network	—N/a
2011	Ikaw Lang ang Mamahalin	GMA Network	—N/a
2011	Daldalita	GMA Network	—N/a
2011	Kokak	GMA Network	—N/a
2012	Legacy	GMA Network	—N/a
2012	Broken Vow	GMA Network	—N/a
2012	Alice Bungisngis and Her Wonder Walis	GMA Network	—N/a
2012	Biritera	GMA Network	—N/a
2012	The Good Daughter	GMA Network	—N/a
2012	My Beloved	GMA Network	—N/a
2012	Hiram na Puso	GMA Network	—N/a
2012	Luna Blanca	GMA Network	—N/a
2012	Kasalanan Bang Ibigin Ka?	GMA Network	—N/a
2012	Makapiling Kang Muli	GMA Network	—N/a
2012	My Daddy Dearest	GMA Network	—N/a
2012	One True Love	GMA Network	—N/a
2012	Together Forever	GMA Network	—N/a
2012	Faithfully	GMA Network	—N/a
2012	Hindi Ka na Mag-iisa	GMA Network	—N/a
2012	Sana ay Ikaw na Nga	GMA Network	—N/a
2012	Aso ni San Roque	GMA Network	—N/a
2012	Magdalena: Anghel sa Putikan	GMA Network	—N/a
2012	Coffee Prince	GMA Network	—N/a
2012	Cielo de Angelina	GMA Network	co-production with GMA Films
2012	Yesterday's Bride	GMA Network	—N/a
2012	Temptation of Wife	GMA Network	—N/a
2012	Paroa: Ang Kuwento ni Mariposa	GMA Network	—N/a
2012	Pahiram ng Sandali	GMA Network	—N/a
2012	Teen Gen	GMA Network	—N/a
2013	Indio	GMA Network	—N/a
2013	Forever	GMA Network	—N/a
2013	Bukod Kang Pinagpala	GMA Network	—N/a
2013	Unforgettable	GMA Network	—N/a
2013	Mundo Mo'y Akin	GMA Network	—N/a
2013	Love & Lies	GMA Network	—N/a
2013	Kakambal ni Eliana	GMA Network	—N/a
2013	Home Sweet Home	GMA Network	—N/a
2013	Mga Basang Sisiw	GMA Network	—N/a
2013	Anna Karenina	GMA Network	—N/a
2013	Maghihintay Pa Rin	GMA Network	—N/a
2013	My Husband's Lover	GMA Network	—N/a
2013	With a Smile	GMA Network	—N/a
2013	Binoy Henyo	GMA Network	—N/a
2013	Pyra: Babaeng Apoy	GMA Network	—N/a
2013	Akin Pa Rin ang Bukas	GMA Network	—N/a
2013	Dormitoryo	GMA Network	—N/a
2013	Prinsesa ng Buhay Ko	GMA Network	—N/a
2013	Kahit Nasaan Ka Man	GMA Network	—N/a
2013	Magkano Ba ang Pag-ibig?	GMA Network	—N/a
2013	Genesis	GMA Network	—N/a
2013	Villa Quintana	GMA Network	—N/a
2013	Adarna	GMA Network	—N/a
2014	The Borrowed Wife	GMA Network	—N/a
2014	Paraiso Ko'y Ikaw	GMA Network	—N/a
2014	Carmela: Ang Pinakamagandang Babae sa Mundong Ibabaw	GMA Network	—N/a
2014	Rhodora X	GMA Network	—N/a
2014	Innamorata	GMA Network	—N/a
2014	Kambal Sirena	GMA Network	—N/a
2014	Niño	GMA Network	—N/a
2014	Ang Dalawang Mrs. Real	GMA Network	—N/a
2014	The Half Sisters	GMA Network	—N/a
2014	Dading	GMA Network	—N/a
2014	My BFF	GMA Network	—N/a
2014	My Destiny	GMA Network	—N/a
2014	Strawberry Lane	GMA Network	—N/a
2014	Hiram na Alaala	GMA Network	—N/a
2014	Ang Lihim ni Annasandra	GMA Network	—N/a
2014	Yagit	GMA Network	—N/a
2014	More Than Words	GMA Network	—N/a
2015	Once Upon a Kiss	GMA Network	—N/a
2015	Second Chances	GMA Network	—N/a
2015	Kailan Ba Tama ang Mali?	GMA Network	—N/a
2015	Pari 'Koy	GMA Network	—N/a
2015	InstaDad	GMA Network	—N/a
2015	Let the Love Begin	GMA Network	—N/a
2015	Healing Hearts	GMA Network	—N/a
2015	The Rich Man's Daughter	GMA Network	—N/a
2015	My Mother's Secret	GMA Network	—N/a
2015	Buena Familia	GMA Network	—N/a
2015	Beautiful Strangers	GMA Network	—N/a
2015	My Faithful Husband	GMA Network	—N/a
2015	MariMar	GMA Network	—N/a
2015	Destiny Rose	GMA Network	—N/a
2015	Little Nanay	GMA Network	—N/a
2015	Because of You	GMA Network	—N/a
2016	Wish I May	GMA Network	—N/a
2016	That's My Amboy	GMA Network	—N/a
2016	Hanggang Makita Kang Muli	GMA Network	—N/a
2016	The Millionaire's Wife	GMA Network	—N/a
2016	Poor Señorita	GMA Network	—N/a
2016	Once Again	GMA Network	—N/a
2016	Juan Happy Love Story	GMA Network	—N/a
2016	Magkaibang Mundo	GMA Network	—N/a
2016	Sa Piling ni Nanay	GMA Network	—N/a
2016	Sinungaling Mong Puso	GMA Network	—N/a
2016	Encantadia	GMA Network	—N/a
2016	Someone to Watch Over Me	GMA Network	—N/a
2016	Oh, My Mama!	GMA Network	—N/a
2016	Alyas Robin Hood	GMA Network	—N/a
2016	Hahamakin ang Lahat	GMA Network	—N/a
2016	Ika-6 na Utos	GMA Network	—N/a
2017	Meant to Be	GMA Network	—N/a
2017	Pinulot Ka Lang sa Lupa	GMA Network	—N/a
2017	Legally Blind	GMA Network	—N/a
2017	Destined to be Yours	GMA Network	—N/a
2017	Mulawin vs. Ravena	GMA Network	—N/a
2017	My Love from the Star	GMA Network	—N/a
2017	Impostora	GMA Network	—N/a
2017	Haplos	GMA Network	—N/a
2017	My Korean Jagiya	GMA Network	—N/a
2017	Super Ma'am	GMA Network	—N/a
2017	Kambal, Karibal	GMA Network	—N/a
2018	The One That Got Away	GMA Network	—N/a
2018	Sherlock Jr.	GMA Network	—N/a
2018	The Stepdaughters	GMA Network	—N/a
2018	Hindi Ko Kayang Iwan Ka	GMA Network	—N/a
2018	Ang Forever Ko'y Ikaw	GMA Network	—N/a
2018	Contessa	GMA Network	—N/a
2018	The Cure	GMA Network	—N/a
2018	Kapag Nahati ang Puso	GMA Network	—N/a
2018	Victor Magtanggol	GMA Network	—N/a
2018	Onanay	GMA Network	—N/a
2018	My Special Tatay	GMA Network	—N/a
2018	Ika-5 Utos	GMA Network	—N/a
2018	Pamilya Roces	GMA Network	—N/a
2018	Asawa Ko, Karibal Ko	GMA Network	—N/a
2018	Cain at Abel	GMA Network	—N/a
2019	Inagaw na Bituin	GMA Network	—N/a
2019	Kara Mia	GMA Network	—N/a
2019	Hiram na Anak	GMA Network	—N/a
2019	Dragon Lady	GMA Network	—N/a
2019	Sahaya	GMA Network	—N/a
2019	Bihag	GMA Network	—N/a
2019	Love You Two	GMA Network	—N/a
2019	Dahil sa Pag-ibig	GMA Network	—N/a
2019	The Better Woman	GMA Network	—N/a
2019	Hanggang sa Dulo ng Buhay Ko	GMA Network	—N/a
2019	Prima Donnas	GMA Network	—N/a
2019	Beautiful Justice	GMA Network	—N/a
2019	The Gift	GMA Network	—N/a
2019	Madrasta	GMA Network	—N/a
2019	Magkaagaw	GMA Network	—N/a
2020	Anak ni Waray vs. Anak ni Biday	GMA Network	—N/a
2020	Love of My Life	GMA Network	—N/a
2020	Descendants of the Sun: The Philippine Adaptation	GMA Network	—N/a
2020	Bilangin ang Bituin sa Langit	GMA Network	—N/a
2021	Babawiin Ko ang Lahat	GMA Network	—N/a
2021	First Yaya	GMA Network	—N/a
2021	Heartful Café	GMA Network	—N/a
2021	Agimat ng Agila	GMA Network	—N/a
2021	Ang Dalawang Ikaw	GMA Network	—N/a
2021	The World Between Us	GMA Network	—N/a
2021	Legal Wives	GMA Network	—N/a
2021	Nagbabagang Luha	GMA Network	—N/a
2021	To Have & to Hold	GMA Network	—N/a
2021	Las Hermanas	GMA Network	—N/a
2021	I Left My Heart in Sorsogon	GMA Network	—N/a
2022	Mano Po Legacy: The Family Fortune	GMA Network	co-production with Regal Entertainment
2022	Little Princess	GMA Network	—N/a
2022	First Lady	GMA Network	—N/a
2022	Widows' Web	GMA Network	—N/a
2022	Artikulo 247	GMA Network	—N/a
2022	Mano Po Legacy: Her Big Boss	GMA Network	co-production with Regal Entertainment
2022	Raya Sirena	GMA Network	co-production with Regal Entertainment
2022	Raising Mamay	GMA Network	—N/a
2022	Apoy sa Langit	GMA Network	—N/a
2022	False Positive	GMA Network	—N/a
2022	Bolera	GMA Network	—N/a
2022	The Fake Life	GMA Network	—N/a
2022	Return to Paradise	GMA Network	—N/a
2022	What We Could Be	GMA Network	co-production with Quantum Films
2022	Abot-Kamay na Pangarap	GMA Network	—N/a
2022	Nakarehas na Puso	GMA Network	—N/a
2022	Start-Up PH	GMA Network	co-production with Studio Dragon and CJ ENM
2022	Maria Clara at Ibarra	GMA Network	—N/a
2022	Mano Po Legacy: The Flower Sisters	GMA Network	co-production with Regal Entertainment
2022	Unica Hija	GMA Network	—N/a
2023	Underage	GMA Network	—N/a
2023	Mga Lihim ni Urduja	GMA Network	—N/a
2023	AraBella	GMA Network	—N/a
2023	Hearts on Ice	GMA Network	—N/a
2023	The Seed of Love	GMA Network	—N/a
2023	Voltes V: Legacy	GMA Network	—N/a
2023	Walang Matigas na Pulis sa Matinik na Misis	GMA Network	—N/a
2023	Royal Blood	GMA Network	—N/a
2023	Magandang Dilag	GMA Network	—N/a
2023	The Missing Husband	GMA Network	—N/a
2023	Maging Sino Ka Man	GMA Network	—N/a
2023	Love Before Sunrise	GMA Network	—N/a
2023	Stolen Life	GMA Network	—N/a
2023	Lovers & Liars	GMA Network	co-production with Regal Entertainment
2024	Love. Die. Repeat.	GMA Network	—N/a
2024	Asawa ng Asawa Ko	GMA Network	—N/a
2024	Lilet Matias: Attorney-at-Law	GMA Network	—N/a
2024	My Guardian Alien	GMA Network	—N/a
2024	Widows' War	GMA Network	—N/a
2024	Pulang Araw	GMA Network	—N/a
2024	Shining Inheritance	GMA Network	—N/a
2024	Forever Young	GMA Network	—N/a
2025	Mga Batang Riles	GMA Network	—N/a
2025	Prinsesa ng City Jail	GMA Network	—N/a
2025	Binibining Marikit	GMA Network	—N/a
2025	Mommy Dearest	GMA Network	—N/a
2025	Slay	GMA Network	—N/a
2025	Encantadia Chronicles: Sang'gre	GMA Network	—N/a
2025	My Father's Wife	GMA Network	—N/a
2025	Sanggang-Dikit FR	GMA Network	—N/a
2025	Akusada	GMA Network	—N/a
2025	Cruz vs Cruz	GMA Network	—N/a
2025	Hating Kapatid	GMA Network	—N/a
2026	House of Lies	GMA Network	—N/a
2026	Never Say Die	GMA Network	—N/a
2026	Apoy sa Dugo	GMA Network	—N/a
2026	Born to Shine	GMA Network	—N/a
2026	The Master Cutter	GMA Network	—N/a
2026	Kamao	GMA Network	—N/a
2026	Taskforce Firewall	GMA Network	—N/a
2026	Delivery Boi	GMA Network	—N/a

=== Variety ===
Year	Title	Network	Notes
2001–2007	Bongga!	GMA Iloilo	—N/a
2001–2010	SOP	GMA Network	—N/a
2001–2016	Walang Tulugan with the Master Showman	GMA Network	—N/a
2004	StarStruck: Stage 1 Live!	GMA Network	—N/a
2004–2006	SOP Gigsters	GMA Network	—N/a
2005–2008	Kuyaw!	GMA Davao	—N/a
2008	Songbird	GMA Network	—N/a
2010	Diz Iz It!	GMA Network	co-production with TAPE Inc.
2010–2013	Party Pilipinas	GMA Network	—N/a
2010–2011	Comedy Bar	GMA Network	—N/a
2010–2011	I Laugh Sabado	Q	—N/a
2013-2015	Sunday All Stars	GMA Network	—N/a
2014	Marian	GMA Network	—N/a
2015–2022	Wowowin	GMA Network	co-production with WBR Entertainment Productions
2015–2019	Sunday PinaSaya	GMA Network	co-production with APT Entertainment
2017	Full House Tonight	GMA Network	—N/a
2018–2019	Toppstar TV	GMA Network	co-production with Rebisco
2018–2019	Studio 7	GMA Network	—N/a
2020–present	All-Out Sundays	GMA Network	—N/a
2021	Flex	GTV	—N/a
2022–present	TiktoClock	GMA Network	—N/a
2024–present	It's Showtime	Kapamilya Channel; A2Z; ALLTV2; GMA Network; GTV	co-production with ABS-CBN Studios

=== Comedy ===
Year	Title	Network	Notes
2001	Kiss Muna	GMA Network	—N/a
2001–2002	Bitoy's World	GMA Network	—N/a
2001–2003	Kool Ka Lang	GMA Network	—N/a
2001–2003	Beh Bote Nga	GMA Network	—N/a
2001–2005	Idol Ko si Kap	GMA Network	—N/a
2001–present	Bubble Gang	GMA Network	—N/a
2002–2003	Daboy en Da Girl	GMA Network	—N/a
2003–2004	All Together Now	GMA Network	—N/a
2003–2007	Lagot Ka... Isusumbong Kita!	GMA Network	—N/a
2003–2008	Nuts Entertainment	GMA Network	—N/a
2004–2007	Bahay Mo Ba 'To?	GMA Network	—N/a
2004–2009	Bitoy's Funniest Videos	GMA Network	—N/a
2004–2005	Naks!	GMA Network	—N/a
2005	Bubble Gang Jr.	GMA Network	—N/a
2005–2006	Hokus Pokus	GMA Network	—N/a
2005–2006	Laugh to Laugh: Ang Kulit!	QTV	—N/a
2005–2006	Ganda ng Lola Ko	QTV	—N/a
2005–2006	O Mare Ko	QTV	—N/a
2005–2006	Project 11	QTV	—N/a
2005–2007	HP: To the Highest Level Na!	GMA Network	—N/a
2005–2007	H3O: Ha Ha Ha Over	QTV	co-production with APT Entertainment
2005–2007	Ay, Robot!	QTV	—N/a
2006	Jologs Guide	GMA Network	—N/a
2006–2007	HP: Ibang Level Na!	GMA Network	—N/a
2007	Who's Your Daddy Now?	GMA Network	—N/a
2007	Just Joking	GMA Network	—N/a
2007–2008	Boys Nxt Door	GMA Network	—N/a
2007–2009	Camera Café	GMA Network; Q	—N/a
2008–2009	Masquerade	GMA Network	—N/a
2008	Jungle TV	GMA Network	—N/a
2009	Outrageous and Courageous	GMA Network	—N/a
2009–2010	Cool Center	GMA Network	—N/a
2009–2010	Joey's Quirky World	GMA Network	—N/a
2009–2010	Wow Hayop	GMA Network	—N/a
2009-2011	Show Me Da Manny	GMA Network	—N/a
2010	Laff En Roll	GMA Network	—N/a
2010	Kaya ng Powers	GMA Network	—N/a
2010	JejeMom	GMA Network	—N/a
2010–present	Pepito Manaloto	GMA Network	—N/a
2011	Andres de Saya	GMA Network	—N/a
2012	Tweets for My Sweet	GMA Network	—N/a
2014–2016	Ismol Family	GMA Network	—N/a
2015	Sabado Badoo	GMA Network	—N/a
2016	A1 Ko Sa 'Yo	GMA Network	—N/a
2016–2017	Hay, Bahay!	GMA Network	co-production with M-Zet Productions
2016–2017	Tsuperhero	GMA Network	—N/a
2016–2022	Dear Uge	GMA Network	co-produced with Uge Productions Inc.
2018–2023	Daddy's Gurl	GMA Network	co-produced with APT Entertainment and M-Zet Productions
2021–2023	Happy Together	GMA Network	co-production with Wacky Solution Productions
2022	TOLS	GTV	—N/a
2022–2024	Jose & Maria's Bonggang Villa	GMA Network	co-production with AgostoDos Pictures and APT Entertainment
2023–2024	Open 24/7	GMA Network	co-production with M-Zet Productions

=== Talk ===
Year	Title	Network	Notes
2001–2004	Partners Mel and Jay	GMA Network	—N/a
2001–2007	S-Files	GMA Network	—N/a
2001–2010	Sis	GMA Network	—N/a
2001–2015	Startalk	GMA Network	—N/a
2002–2003	Inday Heart to Heart	GMA Network	—N/a
2002–2003	Extra Showbiz	GMA Network	—N/a
2003–2004	All About You	GMA Network	—N/a
2003–2004	Celebrity Turns with Junee and Lani/Pops	GMA Network	—N/a
2004	Partners with Mel Tiangco	GMA Network	—N/a
2004–2011	Mel & Joey	GMA Network	—N/a
2005–2007	Showbiz Stripped	GMA Network	—N/a
2005–2009	Moms	Q	—N/a
2006–2007	Gabe Me a Break	Q	—N/a
2007–2009	The Ricky Lo Exclusives	Q	—N/a
2007–2012	Showbiz Central	GMA Network	—N/a
2008	Pinoy Idol Extra	GMA Network	—N/a
2008	The Gud Nite Show	Q	—N/a
2009	Chika Minute Explosive	GMA Network	—N/a
2009	Mommy Diary	GMA Network	—N/a
2009	Full Time Moms	Q	—N/a
2009–2010	Survivor Philippines Exclusive	GMA Network	—N/a
2010–2011	Love ni Mister, Love ni Misis	GMA Network	—N/a
2011–2013	Personalan	GMA News TV	—N/a
2012	Pare & Pare	GMA Network	—N/a
2012–2013	H.O.T. TV: Hindi Ordinaryong Tsismis	GMA Network	—N/a
2012–2018	Sarap Diva	GMA Network	—N/a
2012–2019	Mars	GMA News TV	—N/a
2013	Para sa 'Yo ang Laban Na Ito	GMA Network	—N/a
2013–2015	The Tim Yap Show	GMA Network	—N/a
2013–2016	Love Hotline	GMA News TV; GMA Network	—N/a
2014	Basta Every Day Happy	GMA Network	—N/a
2015–2016	CelebriTV	GMA Network	—N/a
2016	Yan ang Morning!	GMA Network	—N/a
2018–2024	Sarap, 'Di Ba?	GMA Network	—N/a
2019–2022	Mars Pa More	GMA Network	—N/a
2019–present	The Boobay and Tekla Show	GMA Network	—N/a
2023–present	Fast Talk with Boy Abunda	GMA Network	—N/a
2024	My Mother, My Story	GMA Network	—N/a
2026-present	Gandang Gabi Vice	GMA Network; IWant	co-production with ABS-CBN Studios
2026-present	Kalurks!	GTV	—N/a
2026-present	Chika Cart	GTV	—N/a

=== Game ===
Year	Title	Network	Notes
2002–2009	All-Star K!	GMA Network	—N/a
2006–2007	Now Na!	QTV	—N/a
2006–2009	Takeshi's Castle	GMA Network	co-production with Tokyo Broadcasting System
2007	Iba Na ang Matalino: The Nutroplex Brain Challenge	Q	co-production with Unilab
2007–2008	Whammy! Push Your Luck	GMA Network	—N/a
2007–2009	Kakasa Ka Ba sa Grade 5?	GMA Network	—N/a
2008	GoBingo	GMA Network	—N/a
2008	Jungle TV	GMA Network	—N/a
2008–present	Family Feud	GMA Network	co-production with Fremantle Asia
2009	My Dad Is Better Than Your Dad	GMA Network	—N/a
2009	Family Bible Quiz Show	GMA Network	—N/a
2009	Power of 10	GMA Network	—N/a
2009–2010	Hole in the Wall	GMA Network	—N/a
2010	Wipeout: Matira Matibay	GMA Network	co-production with Endemol
2010	Wachamakulit	GMA Network	—N/a
2010	Take Me Out	GMA Network	—N/a
2010	Asar Talo Lahat Panalo!	GMA Network	—N/a
2011–2012	Manny Many Prizes	GMA Network	—N/a
2012–2018	Celebrity Bluff	GMA Network	co-production with Uge Productions Inc.
2013–2014	Bonakid Pre-School: Ready Set Laban!	GMA Network	co-production with Wyeth Philippines
2013–2014	Picture! Picture!	GMA Network	—N/a
2014	Don't Lose the Money	GMA Network	—N/a
2016	Laff Camera Action	GMA Network	—N/a
2017	People vs. the Stars	GMA Network	—N/a
2017–2018	All-Star Videoke	GMA Network	—N/a
2017–2018	Bossing & Ai	GMA Network	co-production with M-Zet Productions
2021	Game of the Gens	GTV	—N/a
2022	The Wall Philippines	GMA Network	co-production with Cignal Entertainment and Viva Television
2026–present	The People Have Spoken	GMA Network	—N/a

=== Reality ===
Year	Title	Network	Notes
2002	The Great Globe Adventure	GMA Network	co-production with Globe Telecom
2003–2013	Extra Challenge	GMA Network	—N/a
2004	Click Barkada Hunt	GMA Network	—N/a
2004–2006	Wag Kukurap	GMA Network	—N/a
2005–2006	Fam Jam	QTV	—N/a
2005–2006	Show Ko!	QTV	—N/a
2005–2007	Pop Star Kids	QTV	—N/a
2006–2007	HP: Ibang Level Na!	GMA Network	—N/a
2007–2008	Kung Ako Ikaw	GMA Network	—N/a
2008	World Records	GMA Network	—N/a
2011	Amazing Cooking Kids	GMA Network	—N/a
2022–2024	Running Man Philippines	GMA Network	co-production with Seoul Broadcasting System
2025-2026	Pinoy Big Brother: Celebrity Collab Edition	GMA Network	co-production with ABS-CBN Studios and Banijay Asia
2025–present	Stars on the Floor	GMA Network	—N/a

==== Talent-based ====
Year	Title	Network	Notes
2003–2004	Search for a Star	GMA Network	co-production with Viva Television
2003–2019	StarStruck	GMA Network	—N/a
2004	StarStruck Kids	GMA Network	—N/a
2004	30 Days	GMA Network	—N/a
2004–2007	Pinoy Pop Superstar	GMA Network	—N/a
2007	Move: The Search for Billy Crawford's Pinoy Dancers	GMA Network	—N/a
2007	Coca-Cola's Ride to Fame: Yes to Your Dreams!	GMA Network	co-production with Coca-Cola Bottlers Philippines Inc.
2007–2009	Celebrity Duets: Philippine Edition	GMA Network	—N/a
2008	Pinoy Idol	GMA Network	co-production with FremantleMedia Asia, 19 Entertainment and CKX Inc.
2009	Are You the Next Big Star?	GMA Network	co-production with Alta Productions Group
2009–2010	Bitoy's Showwwtime	GMA Network	—N/a
2010	Danz Showdown	GMA Network	co-production with FOCUS Entertainment Inc.
2011–2012	Protégé	GMA Network	—N/a
2013	Anak Ko Yan!	GMA Network	—N/a
2014	Bet ng Bayan	GMA Network	—N/a
2015	To the Top	GMA Network	co-production with GMA Public Affairs
2016	Superstar Duets	GMA Network	—N/a
2016–2017	#Like	GMA Network	—N/a
2016–2018	Lip Sync Battle Philippines	GMA Network	—N/a
2018–present	The Clash	GMA Network	—N/a
2020–2021	Centerstage	GMA Network	—N/a
2021	Catch Me Out Philippines	GMA Network	—N/a
2023	Battle of the Judges	GMA Network	—N/a
2023	The Voice Generations	GMA Network	co-production with ITV Studios
2024–present	The Voice Kids	GMA Network	co-production with ITV Studios
2026-present	The Clash Teens	GMA Network	—N/a

=== Infotainment ===
Year	Title	Network	Notes
2007–2009	Chef to Go	Q	—N/a
2007–2009	Living It Up	Q	—N/a
2007–2010	Pinoy Records	GMA Network	—N/a
2007–2011	The Sweet Life	Q	—N/a
2007–2014	Kap's Amazing Stories	GMA Network	—N/a
2008–2010	Ripley's Believe It or Not!	GMA Network	—N/a
2009–2015	Tropang Potchi	Q GMA Network	co-production with Columbia International Food Products Inc.
2010	Zooperstars	GMA Network	—N/a
2010–present	iBilib	GMA Network	—N/a
2011–2012	My Chubby World	GMA Network	co-production with Rebisco
2012	Nay-1-1	GMA Network	—N/a
2012–2013	Watta Job	GMA Network	—N/a
2012–2022	Taste Buddies	GMA News TV; GTV	—N/a
2018–present	Amazing Earth	GMA Network	—N/a

==== Cooking ====
Year	Title	Network	Notes
2009–2012	Quickfire	Q GMA News TV	—N/a
2011–2020	Idol sa Kusina	GMA News TV	—N/a
2012–2014	Chef Boy Logro: Kusina Master	GMA Network	—N/a
2021–present	Farm to Table	GTV	—N/a

=== Documentary ===
Year	Title	Network	Notes
2010-2011	Anatomy of a Disaster	GMA Network	co-production with GRB Entertainment

=== Films ===
==== 2024 ====
Title	Release date	Director	Cast	Genre(s)	Associated film production
Balota	August 3	Kip Oebanda	Marian Rivera	Drama	GMA Pictures; Film Development Council of the Philippines

=== Concerts ===
==== Headlining concerts ====
Title	Performer(s)	Date(s)	Country	Venue	Ref.
3 Stars, 1 Heart	Regine Velasquez Julie Anne San Jose Christian Bautista	January 20, 2018	Philippines	Waterfront Hotel and Casino; Cebu City	
The Sweetheart and the Balladeer	Julie Anne San Jose Christian Bautista	January 27, 2019	Philippines	Iloilo Convention Center; Iloilo City, Iloilo	
Queendom	Julie Anne San Jose Rita Daniela Jessica Villarubin Thea Astley Mariane Osabel Hannah Precillas	December 2, 2023	Philippines	Newport Performing Arts Theater; Pasay, Metro Manila	
Julie x Stell: Ang Ating Tinig	Julie Anne San Jose Stell	July 27–28, 2024	Philippines	New Frontier Theater; Araneta City, Cubao, Quezon City	
