= Bolera =

2022 Philippine television drama series

- Title card
- Also known as: Break Shot
- Genre: Sports drama
- Created by: J-mee Katanyag
- Written by: Des Garbes-Severino; J-mee Katanyag; Benson Logronio; Nehemiarey Dallego
- Directed by: Dominic Zapata; Jorron Lee Monroy
- Creative director: Aloy Adlawan
- Starring: Kylie Padilla
- Opening theme: "Ang Bolera" by Kylie Padilla
- Country of origin: Philippines
- Original language: Tagalog
- No. of episodes: 65

Production
- Executive producer: Arlene D. Pilapil
- Cinematography: Roman Theodossis
- Editors: Benedict Lavastida; Robert Ryan Reyes
- Camera setup: Multiple-camera setup
- Running time: 23–34 minutes
- Production company: GMA Entertainment Group

Original release
- Network: GMA Network
- Release: May 30 – August 26, 2022

Bolera (transl. bowling alley / international title: Break Shot) is a 2022 Philippine television drama sports series broadcast by GMA Network. Directed by Dominic Zapata and Jorron Lee Monroy, it stars Kylie Padilla in the title role. It premiered on May 30, 2022, on the network's Telebabad line up. The series concluded on August 26, 2022, with a total of 65 episodes.

The series is streaming online on YouTube.

== Cast and characters ==
Cast

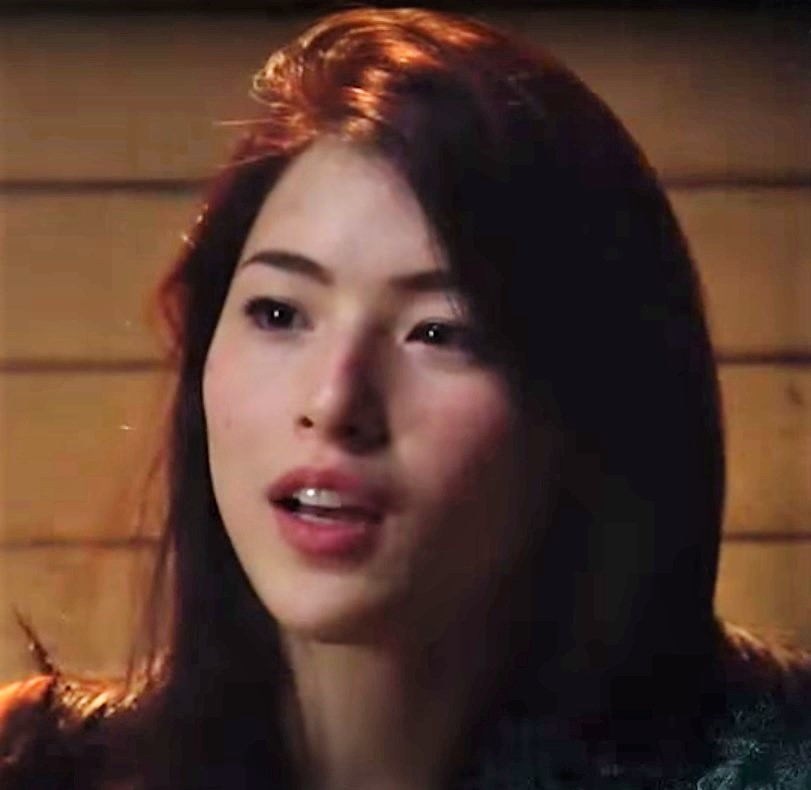
Kylie Padilla

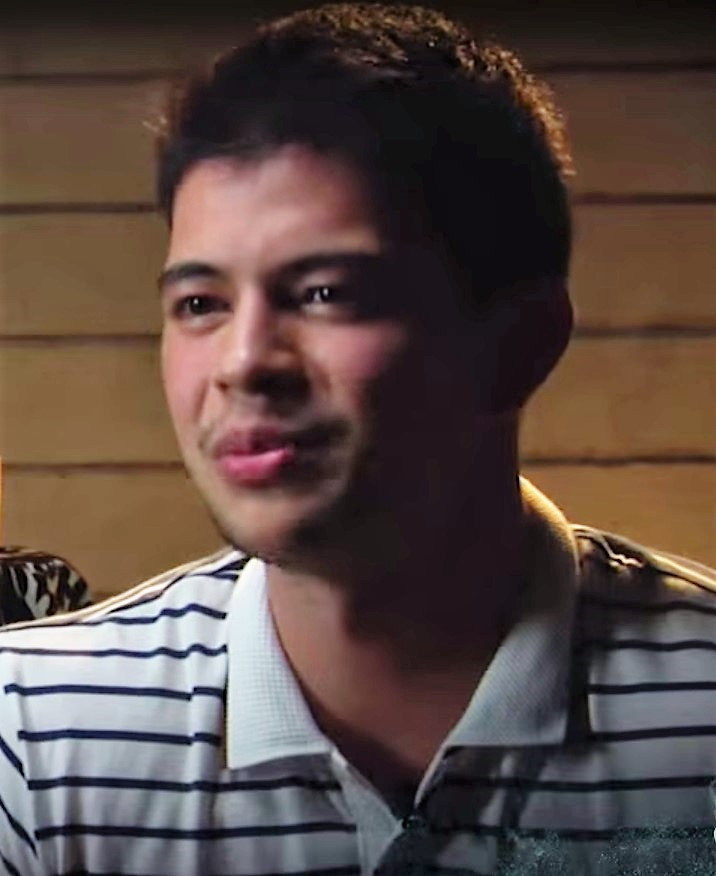
Rayver Cruz

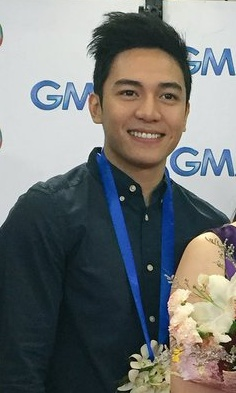
Jak Roberto

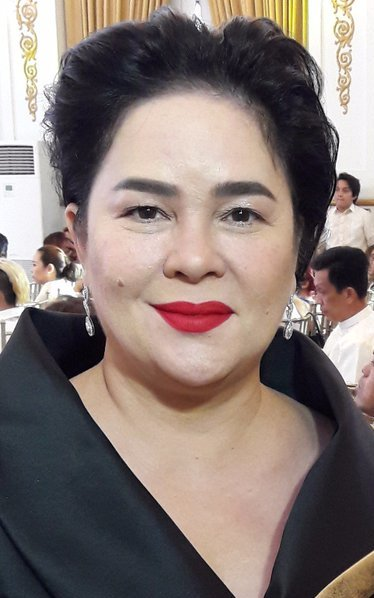
Jaclyn Jose

Lead cast

- Kylie Padilla as Jose Maria "Joni/Bolera" Fajardo Jr.

Supporting cast

- Rayver Cruz as Miguel Salvador / El Salvador
- Jak Roberto as Pepito "Toypits" Canlas
- Jaclyn Jose as Tessa Carillo-Fajardo
- Gardo Versoza as Marco "Cobrador" Alcantara
- Joey Marquez as Freddie "Scorpion" Roldan
- David Remo as Jose Maria "Tres" Fajardo III
- Via Veloso as Marla Toledo-Roldan
- Ge Villamil as Marika "Kikay" Carillo
- Luri Vincent Nalus as Pogi

Guest cast

- Al Tantay as Jose Maria "Joma/JoMaster" Fajardo Sr.
- Lauren Young as younger Tessa
- Klea Pineda as Sheena "Golden Eye" Kim
- Ina Raymundo as Floriza "White Lotus" Andal
- Julia Lee as Laura Cruz-Salvador
- Sue Prado as Romana "Roma" Canlas
- Mico Aytona as Felix "Magicman of Cebu" delos Reyes
- Elle Ramirez as Macy "Amazing Macy" delos Reyes
- Andrew Gan as Datu "Bulls Eye" Gidapawan
- Mhyca Bautista as Cynthia "Strong Heart" Mapag
- Mel Caluag as Tina
- Josh Bulot as Benjo
- Jeremy Sabido as Caloy
- Efren "Bata" Reyes as himself

== Production ==
Principal photography commenced in February 2022. Filming concluded on April 27, 2022.

== Ratings ==
According to AGB Nielsen Philippines' Nationwide Urban Television Audience Measurement People in television homes, the pilot episode of Bolera earned a 12.7% rating. The final episode scored a 16.3% rating.
