= Sofia Pablo =

Filipina actress

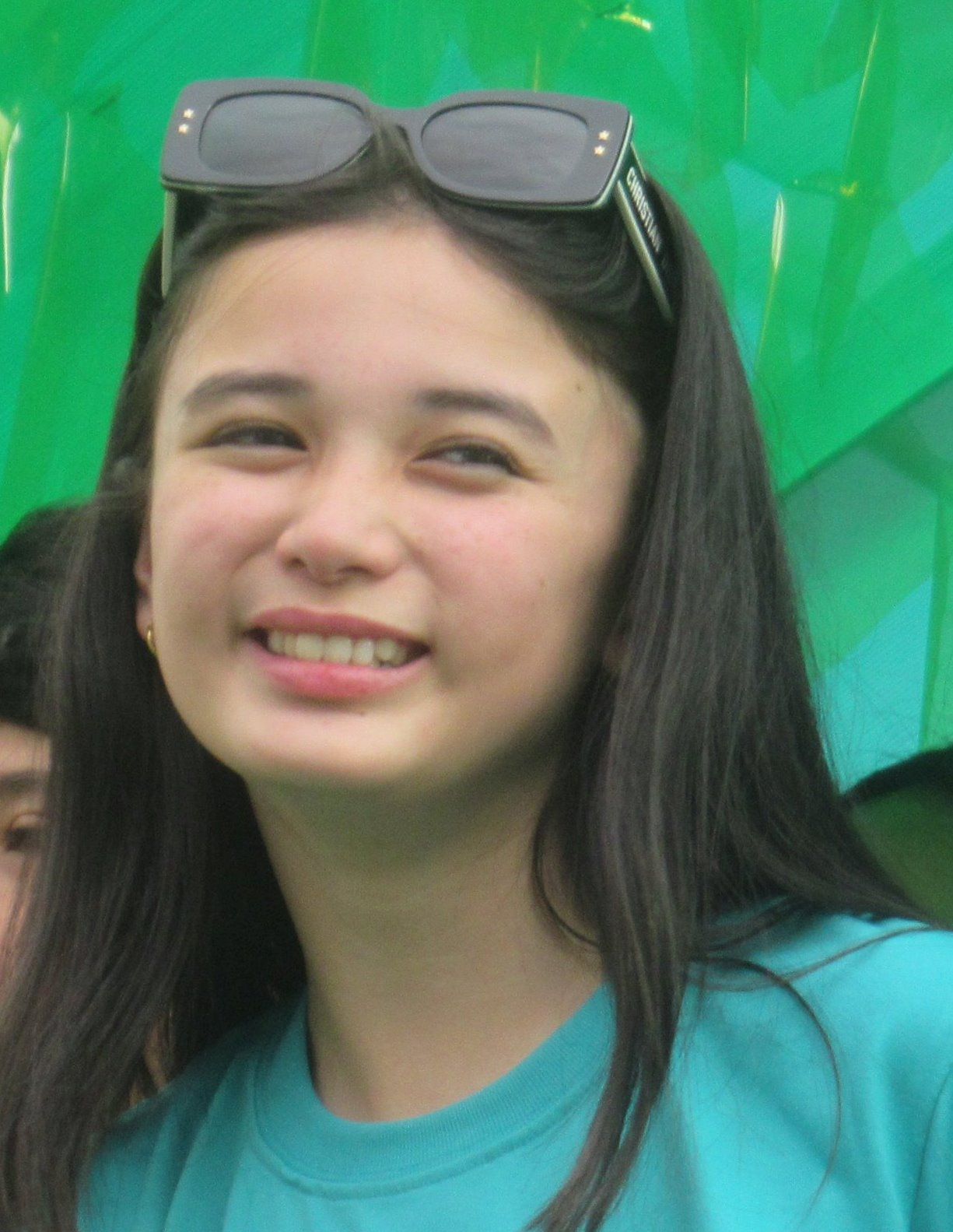
- Pablo in 2024
- Born: Sofia Beatrice Hijazi Pablo; April 10, 2006 (age 20); Quezon City, Philippines
- Occupation: Actress
- Years active: 2015–present
- Agent: Sparkle GMA Artist Center

Sofia Beatrice Hijazi Pablo (born April 10, 2006) is a Filipino actress. Pablo is a talent of Sparkle GMA Artist Center.

== Early life and education ==
Pablo was born on April 10, 2006. She is of Filipino and Spanish descent on her father's side and Chinese and Lebanese on her mother's side. She finished elementary school at O.B. Montessori Center in Greenhills, San Juan, while she finished junior and senior high school under the ABM track at UST Angelicum College in 2023 and 2025, respectively. She studied for communication degree along actor Allen Ansay at the same school.

== Career ==
She began her career in 2017, when she joined the cast of the television series, Tadhana. She is best known for her role in the television series Prima Donnas as Len-Len, Luv Is: Caught in His Arms as Florence, and Prinsesa ng City Jail as Princess. Pablo has also appeared in various television shows, including Magpakailanman, Wish Ko Lang, Dear Uge, and Pinoy Big Brother: Celebrity Collab Edition 2.0.

== Filmography ==
Key
†	Denotes films or TV productions that have not yet been released

=== Film ===
Year	Title	Role	Ref.
2024	Green Bones	Ruth Z. Pineda	
2026	Huwag Kang Titingin	Selene Ramirez	

=== Television ===
Year	Title	Role	Notes	Ref.
2015	And I Love You So	Young Trixie		
2015	Because of You	Candy Salcedo		
2016	Dear Uge	Angel	Episode: "Mother Knows Beast"	
2016	Oh, My Mama!	Nicole		
2017	Destined to be Yours	Lala		
2017	Magpakailanman	Young Judith	Episode: "Abot Kamay Ang Pangarap: The Erwin Dayrit Story"	
2017	Super Ma'am	Young Mabelle Henerala		
2018	Magpakailanman	Young Alodia Gosiengfiao	Episode: "When Love Conquers All, The Wil Dasovich & Alodia Gosiengfiao Story"	
2018	Daig Kayo ng Lola Ko	Sleepy	Episode: "Snow White & The Seven Dwarfs"	
2018	Sherlock Jr.	Caray Nunez		
2018	Onanay	Gracie Pascual Samonte		
2019	Magpakailanman	Dhine	Episode: "Arrest My Son’s Rapist"	
2019	Maynila	Jona	Episode: "My Wicked Tita"	
2019	Sunday PinaSaya	Mainstay / Performer / Various roles		
2019	Maynila	Emmy	Episode: "Friends-Ever"	
2019	TODA One I Love	Young Angela "Gelay" Dimagiba		
2019–2022	Prima Donnas	Donna Lyn "Lenlen" Madreal Claveria		
2020	Maynila: Crush Me	Merry		
2020; 2021–present	All-Out Sundays	Guest (2020); Mainstay / Performer / Co-Host (since 2021)		
2021	Regal Studio Presents	Raya	Episode: "Raya Sirena"	
2022	Raya Sirena	Raya (mermaid)		
2022	Daig Kayo ng Lola Ko	Charmelle	Episode: "Charing's Charm"	
2022	Wish Ko Lang	Lovely	Episode: "Pangarap Ni Lola"	
2022	Regal Studio Presents	Yuki	Episode: "Mind The Gap"	
2022	Tadhana	Aurora	Episode: "Hanggang Kailan"	
2022	Regal Studio Presents	Jinky	Episode: "I Like You Tol"	
2022	Daig Kayo Ng Lola Ko	Carol	Episode: "Carol Parol"	
2023	Luv Is: Caught in His Arms	Florencia "Florence" dela Cruz / Celestina Almero		
2023	In My Dreams	Sari		
2023	Regal Studio Presents	Ana	Episode: "Last Love"	
2023	Regal Studio Presents	Rose	Episode: "The Ghosting"	
2023	Daig Kayo ng Lola Ko	Tarzie	Episode: "Be The Bes"	
2023	Regal Studio Presents	Isay	Episode: "Start Again"	
2023	Sparkle U: #Ghosted	Alessi / Liane Gaspar		
2023–2024	Open 24/7	Kitty "Kikay" Fontanilla		
2024	Ok Ako	Kitty		
2024	Regal Studio Presents	Isa	Episode: "Especially For Tay"	
2025	Prinsesa ng City Jail	Princess Pascual / Princess Torres-Cristobal		
2025	It's Showtime	Guest / Performer		
2025	Regal Studio Presents	Heidi	Episode: "Dikit-dikit, Langit-langit"	
2025–2026	Pinoy Big Brother: Celebrity Collab Edition 2.0	Housemate		
2026	Barangay Love Stories	Ella	Episode: "Pangako Hanggang sa Dulo"	

== Accolades ==
Year	Award	Category	Result	Ref.
2023	6th Philippine Empowered Men & Women of the Year 2023	Empowered Teen Star – Loveteam of the Year (with Allen Ansay)	Won	
2023	Global Trends Business Leaders Awards 2023	Most Promising Loveteam of the Year (with Allen Ansay)	Won	
2023	Asia's Royalty Awards	Most Admirable and In-Demand Young Actress of the Year	Won	
