= Twisted Fate =

Twisted Fate may refer to:

- Twisted Fate, a 1993 film by Randall Frakes
- "Twisted Fate", a song on the 2010 album Into the Great Beyond
- "Twisted Fate", a 2013 episode of Japanese television series Terrace House: Boys × Girls Next Door
- Twisted Fate, a 2014 short story collection by Traci Hunter Abramson and two other authors
- "Twisted Fate", a 2017 episode of South Korean television series The Lady in Dignity
- "Twisted Fate", a 2020 episode of Philippine television series Prima Donnas
- "Twisted Fate", a 2023 episode of South Korean television series Joseon Attorney

== See also ==
- Twist of Fate (disambiguation)
