= 47th Gawad Urian Awards =

Award ceremony for Philippine films of 2023

- Date: June 8, 2024
- Site: The Verdure, Henry Sy Sr. Hall, De La Salle University, Manila, Philippines

Highlights
- Best Picture: Iti Mapukpukaw
- Most awards: Third World Romance (4)
- Most nominations: GomBurZa (12)

The 47th Gawad Urian Awards (Filipino: Ika-47 na Gawad Urian) is held on June 8, 2024. Established in 1976, the Gawad Urian Awards highlights the best of Philippine cinema as decided by the Filipino Film Critics. The best Philippine films for the year 2023 are honored in the event at the De La Salle University. For the first time in the awards-giving body's history, the Best Picture award is conferred to an animated film, Iti Mapukpukaw.

== Winners and nominees ==
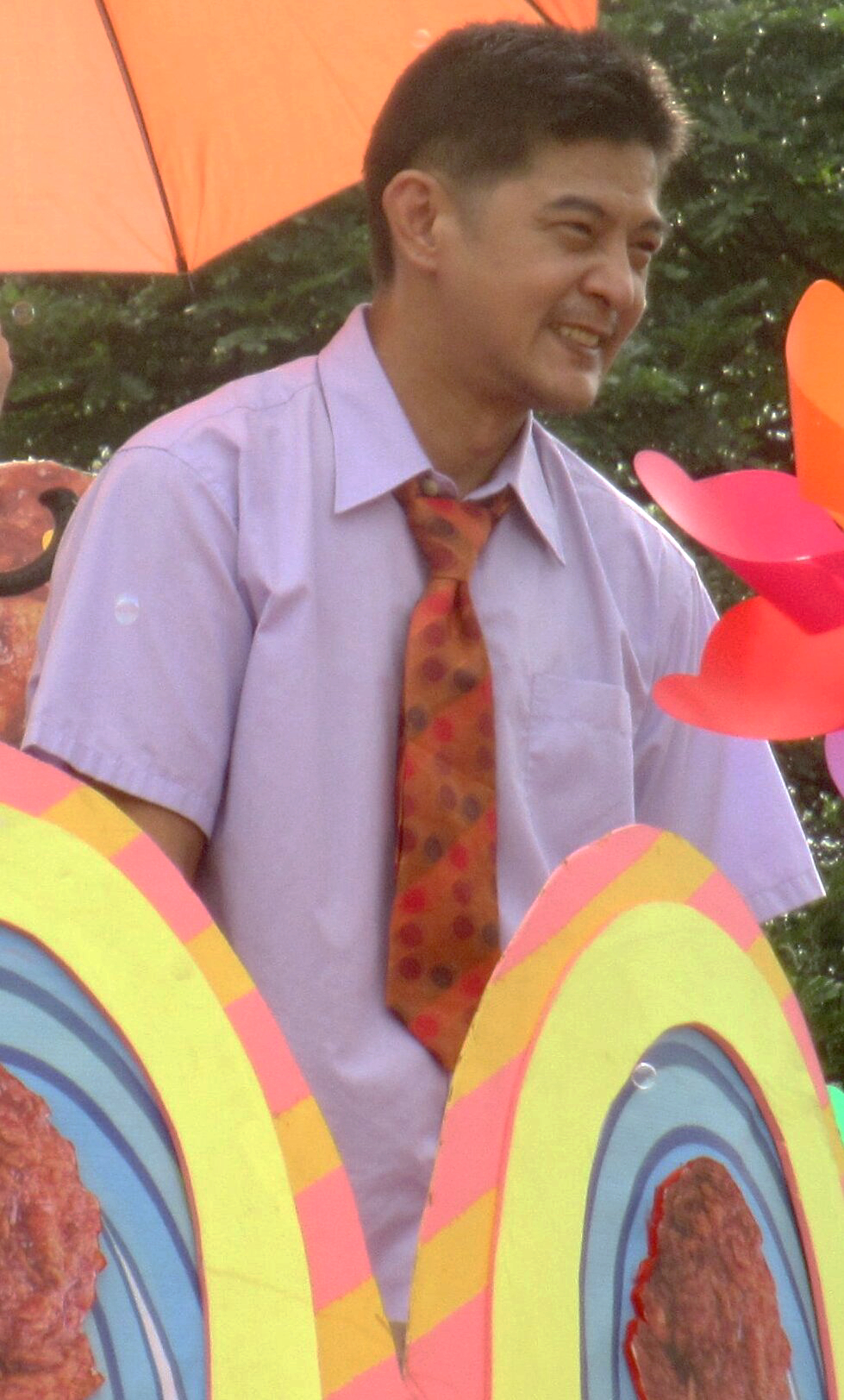
Romnick Sarmenta bags the Best Leading Actor award for his role as Ericson in About Us but Not About Us.

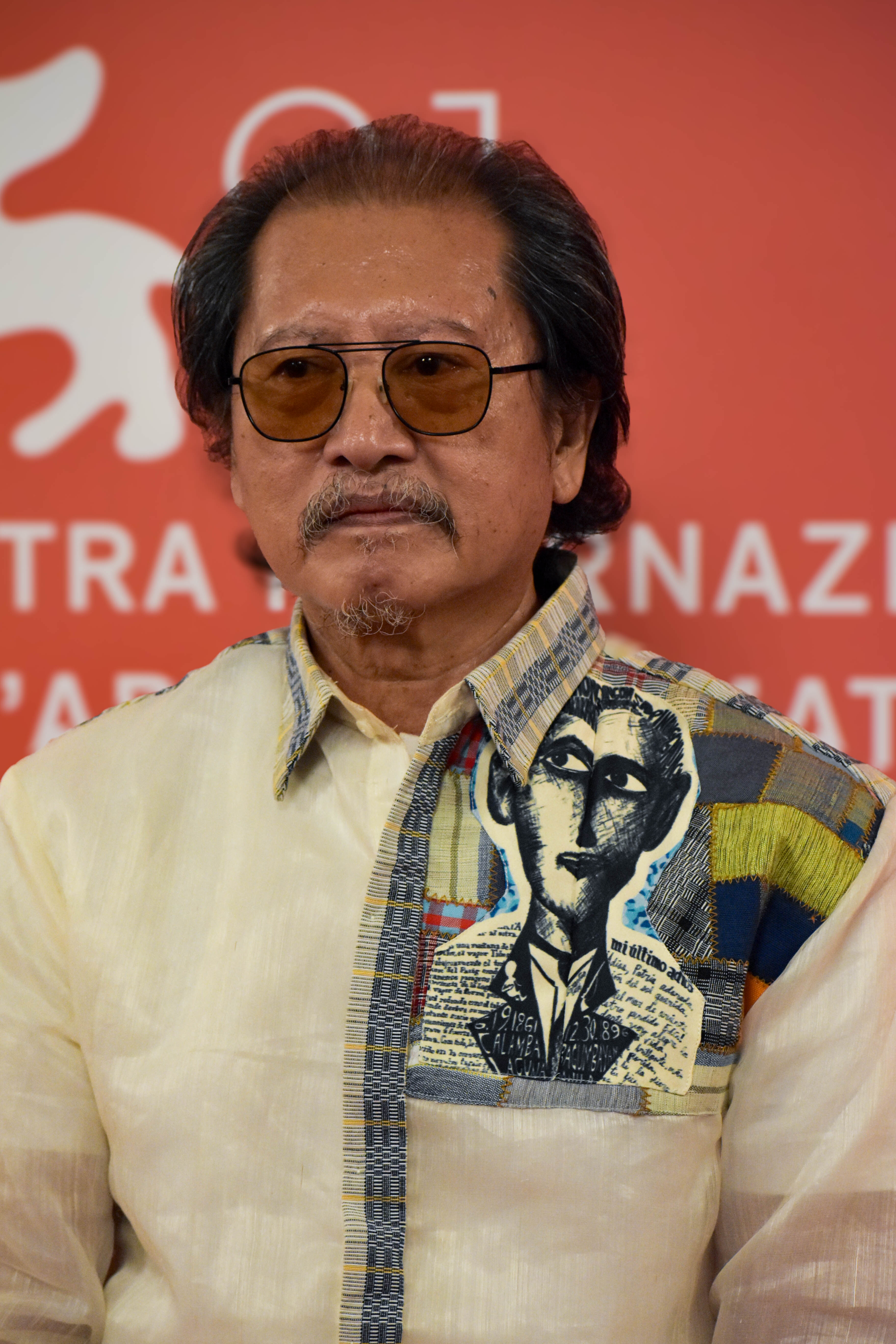
Ronnie Lazaro takes the Best Supporting Actor prize for his role as Berto in the Sheron R. Dayoc film, The Gospel of the Beast.

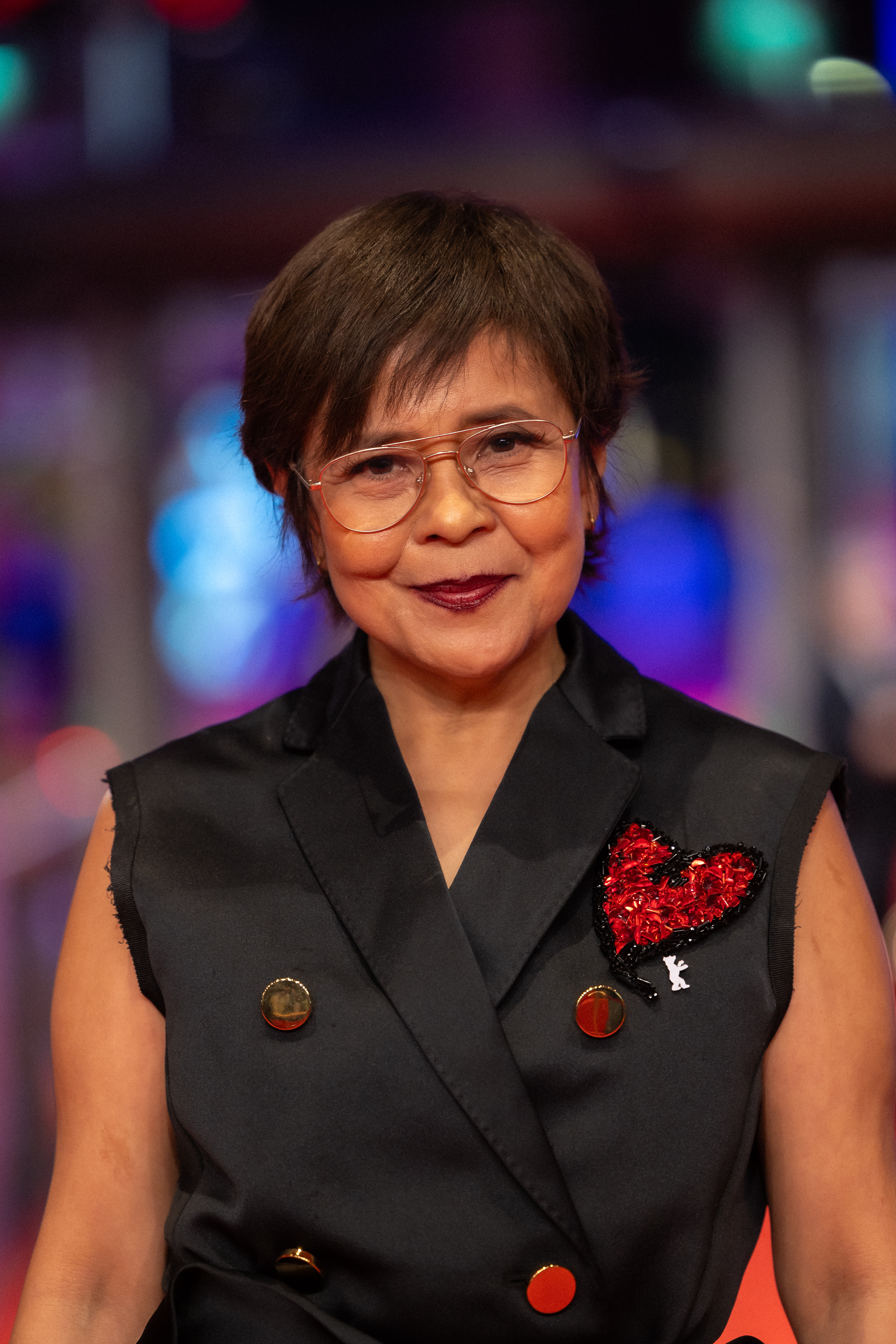
Dolly de Leon takes the Best Supporting Actress prize for her role as Jill Sebastian in the anthology film, Ang Duyan ng Magiting.

Winners are listed first and bolded.

Best Picture Pinakamahusay na Pelikula	Best Director Pinakamahusay na Direksyon
**Iti Mapukpukaw**; About Us but Not About Us; Ang Duyan ng Magiting; Firefly; GomBurZa; Third World Romance	**Dwein Baltazar – Third World Romance**; Carl Joseph Papa – Iti Mapukpukaw; Jun Lana – About Us but Not About Us; Pepe Diokno – GomBurZa; Sheron R. Dayoc – The Gospel of the Beast; Zig Madamba Dulay – Firefly
Best Actor Pinakamahusay na Pangunahing Aktor	Best Actress Pinakamahusay na Pangunahing Aktres
**Romnick Sarmenta** **– About Us but Not About Us**; Carlo Aquino – Third World Romance; Cedrick Juan – GomBurZa; Euwenn Mikaell – Firefly; Jansen Magpusao – The Gospel of the Beast; Paolo O'Hara – Ang Duyan ng Magiting	**Charlie Dizon – Third World Romance**; Gabby Padilla – Gitling; Kathryn Bernardo – A Very Good Girl; Max Eigenmann – Raging Grace
Best Supporting Actor Pinakamahusay na Pangalawang Aktor	Best Supporting Actress Pinakamahusay na Pangalawang Aktres
**Ronnie Lazaro – The Gospel of the Beast**; Dante Rivero – GomBurZa; Enchong Dee – GomBurZa; Jeffrey Quizon – Firefly; Piolo Pascual – GomBurZa	**Dolly de Leon – Ang Duyan ng Magiting**; Agot Isidro – Ang Duyan ng Magiting; Alessandra de Rossi – Firefly; Frances Ignacio – Ang Duyan ng Magiting; Jorrybell Agoto – When This Is All Over
Best Screenplay Pinakamahusay na Dulang Pampelikula	Best Cinematography Pinakamahusay na Sinematograpiya
**About Us but Not About Us**; Firefly; GomBurZa; Iti Mapukpukaw; Third World Romance	**GomBurZa**; Firefly; Gitling; Huling Palabas; The Gospel of the Beast
Best Production Design Pinakamahusay na Disenyong Pamproduksyon	Best Editing Pinakamahusay na Editing
**Third World Romance**; Ang Duyan ng Magiting; Firefly; GomBurZa; Huling Palabas; In My Mother's Skin	**The Gospel of the Beast**; About Us but Not About Us; Firefly; GomBurZa; Iti Mapukpukaw; When This Is All Over
Best Music Pinakamahusay na Musika	Best Sound Pinakamahusay na Tunog
**Third World Romance**; Firefly; GomBurZa; Iti Mapukpukaw; When This Is All Over	**Iti Mapukpukaw**; About Us but Not About Us; Ang Duyan ng Magiting; GomBurZa; Raging Grace
Best Short Film Pinakamahusay na Maikling Pelikula	Best Documentary Pinakamahusay na Dokyumentaryo
**Hito**; Abutan Man Tayo ng House Lights; Ate Bunso; Cross My Heart and Hope to Die; Karkarma; Tumatawa, Umiiyak	**Baon sa Biyahe**; Ghosts of Kalantiaw; Maria; Nitrate
Best Animated Film Pinakamahusay na Animasyon
**Iti Mapukpukaw**

== Special Award ==
=== Natatanging Gawad Urian ===
- Hilda Koronel

== Multiple nominations and awards ==
Films that received multiple nominations
Nominations	Films
12	GomBurZa
10	Firefly
7	Ang Duyan ng Magiting
7	Iti Mapukpukaw
7	Third World Romance
6	About Us but Not About Us
5	The Gospel of the Beast
3	When This Is All Over
2	Gitling
2	Huling Palabas
2	Raging Grace

Films that won multiple awards
Awards	Film
4	Third World Romance
3	Iti Mapukpukaw
2	About Us but Not About Us
2	The Gospel of the Beast
