= Jorrybell Agoto =

Filipina actress (1994–2026)

- Born: September 25, 1994; Ilocos Region, Luzon, Philippines
- Died: November 17, 2026 (aged 32)
- Education: Polytechnic University of the Philippines (BA)
- Occupation: Actress
- Years active: 2019–2026

Jorrybell Agoto (September 25, 1994 – November 17, 2026) was a Filipino actress. She was known for her roles on independent films such as When This Is All Over (2023), which earned her a Gawad Urian nomination, Tether (2023), AraBella (2023), and Filipiñana (2026).

== Early life and career ==
Agoto was born on September 25, 1994 in the Ilocos Region in the Philippines. She was fascinated with Filipino television dramas as a child and began acting at a young age, performing at a community theater. She eventually studied theater at the Polytechnic University of the Philippines, graduating with a Bachelor of Arts in Theater Arts.

She started acting on short films in 2019, and starred in the Silver Bear-winning short Filipiñana.

In 2025, Agoto was selected to participate in the Berlinale Talents development programme.

Agoto was best known for starring as Isabel, a 17-year-old golf course worker, in Rafael Manuel's feature film Filipiñana (2026). The film is an expansion of Manuel's 2020 short film of the same name, which won the Silver Bear Jury Prize (Short Film) at the 70th Berlin International Film Festival. In both the short and feature film, Agoto portrays Isabel, whose experiences on an exclusive golf course explore themes of class, power and social inequality.

== Personal life and death ==
Agoto was diagnosed with lymphoma. In September 2026, she was admitted to the intensive care unit of St. Luke's Medical Center in Quezon City. Agoto died from the illness on November 17, 2026, at the age of 32.

== Filmography ==
=== Film ===
Year	Title	Role	Notes	Ref.
2019	The Slums	Pam	Short film	
2020	Filipiñana	Isabel	Short film	
2020	Naraniag a Bulan		Short film	
2022	Ang Pangungumpisal		Short film	
2023	Spellbound	Show Crew		
2023	When This Is All Over	Rosemarie	19th Cinemalaya Independent Film Entry	
2023	Tether	Kate	19th Cinemalaya Independent Film Entry	
2023	Cross My Heart and Hope to Die	Mila	Short film	
2023	Primetime Mother		Short film	
2023	Congratulations, Dx!	Irene	Short film	
2024	Tadhana	Camille; Young Camille; Camille's Mom	Short film	
2024	Dog in Search of a Leash	Bebang	Short film	
2025	P77	Cory		
2025	Haplos sa Hangin	Cha		
2025	Ours Was a Timeless Night Burning	Mariel	Short film	
2025	Sisa	Cedes		
2025	Filipiñana	Isabel	Reprised 2020 role	
2026	The Dream	Amanda	Short film	
2026	Silenced Nights			

=== Television ===
Year	Title	Role	Notes	Ref.
2023	AraBella	Dara	78 Episodes	

== Accolades ==
Awards and NominationsAwards and nominations received by Jorrybell Agoto
Award	Year	Category	Nominated work	Result	Ref.
Gawad Urian Award	2024	Best Supporting Actress	When This Is All Over	Nominated	
Luna Awards	2026	Best Actress	Filipiñana	Pending	
Singapore International Film Festival	2023	Best Performance	Cross My Heart and Hope to Die	Nominated	
PMPC Star Awards for Movies	2024	New Movie Actress of the Year	Tether	Nominated	
