= Althea Ablan =

Filipino actress (born 2004)

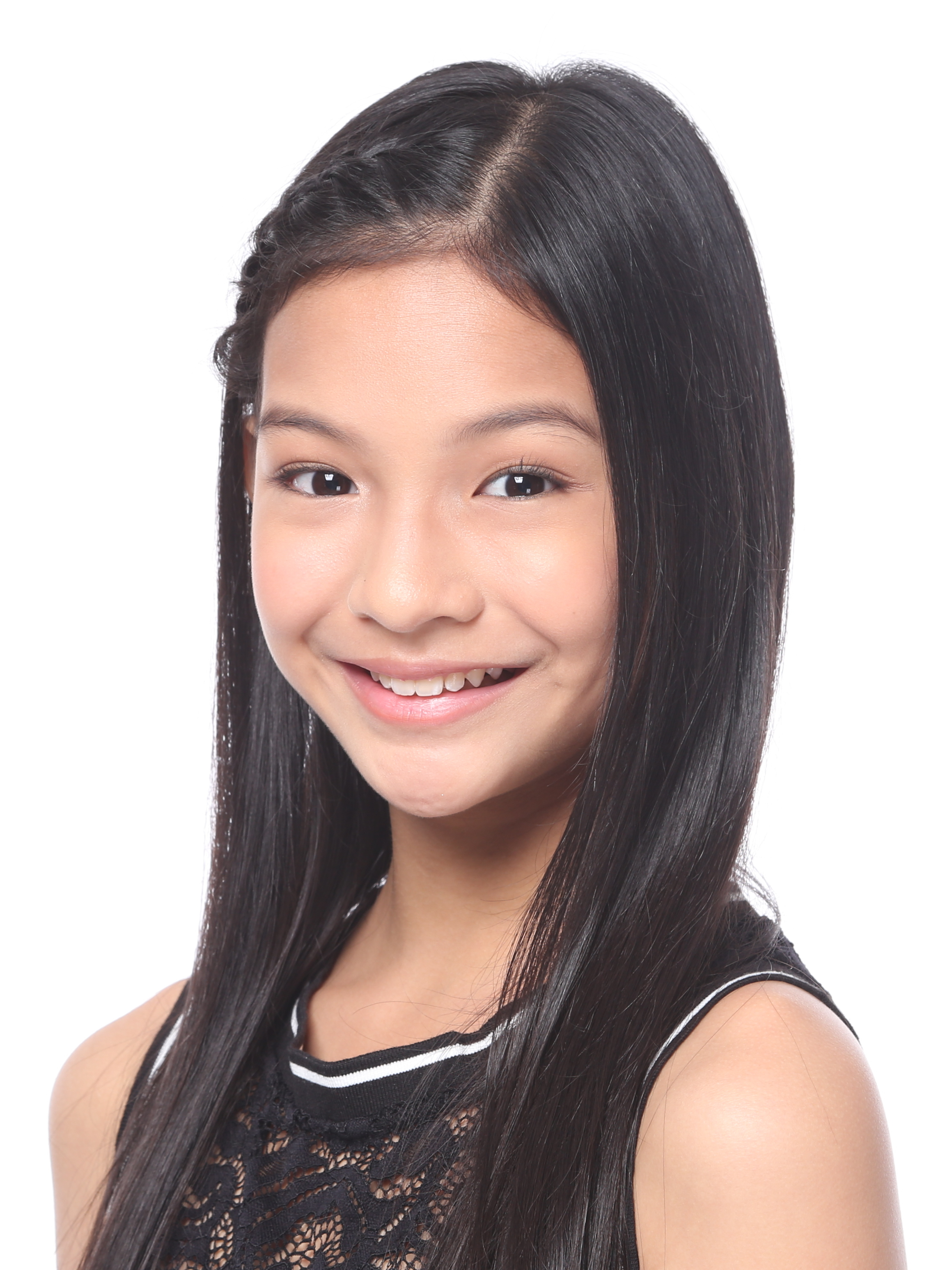
- Ablan in 2016
- Born: Maria Altheyah Sofia Olivar Ablan; October 9, 2004 (age 22)
- Other name: Thea
- Occupation: Actress
- Years active: 2015–present
- Agents: Sparkle; Viva Artists Agency
- Known for: Donna Belle in Prima Donnas

Maria Altheyah Sofia Olivar Ablan (born October 9, 2004), better known as Althea Ablan, is a Filipino actress. She is known for her main protagonist role in Prima Donnas (2019) as Donna Belle, and her anti-hero role in AraBella as Bella or Jona.

== Early life and education ==
Maria Altheyah Sofia Olivar Ablan was born on October 9, 2004. She has three brothers.

She studied junior high school at Mother Maria Maddalena Starace School in Parañaque. She finished senior high school at Don Bosco High School in Parañaque. She studied for a tourism degree at the Polytechnic University of the Philippines.

== Career ==
She first appeared in several television commercials before she played the role of young Kristine (Heart Evangelista) in the television series Beautiful Strangers. She also portrayed younger roles in Encantadia and Mulawin vs. Ravena.

In 2019, she starred in Prima Donnas wherein she was paired with actor Bruce Roeland. The two were later reunited in the anthology series Regal Studio Presents: My Boss, My Love.

In 2021, Ablan appeared in My Fantastic Pag-ibig: Fallen alongside Prince Clemente. On the following year, she then appeared in an episode of Regal Studio Presents, titled "Win a Date" opposite Yasser Marta.

In 2023, she and ABS-CBN actor Seth Fedelin were chosen by the clothing brand BNY Jeans as their ambassadors.

Along with Shayne Sava, they were topbilled in series AraBella.

In 2026, Ablan joined Viva Artists Agency after her contract with GMA expired.

== Personal life ==
Ablan confirmed her relationship with actor Prince Clemente on Fast Talk with Boy Abunda in January 2024.

== Filmography ==
=== Film ===
Key
†	Denotes films that have not yet been released

Althea Ablan's film credits with year of release, film titles and roles
Year	Title	Role	Ref.
2025	Shake, Rattle & Roll: Evil Origins	Pia	
2026	Poon	Faye	

=== Television ===
Key
†	Denotes shows that have not yet been aired

Althea Ablan's television credits with year of release, title(s) and role
Year	Title	Role	Ref.
2015	Beautiful Strangers	young Kristine	
2016	Magkaibang Mundo	young Sofie	
2016	Hahamakin ang Lahat	young Phoebe	
2016	Encantadia	young Alena	
2017	Meant to Be	Apple Dela Cruz	
2017	Haplos	young Angela	
2017	Mulawin vs. Ravena	young Lawiswis	
2017	Magpakailanman: Pinay in the Happiest Place in the World: The Lucy Navarrete-Valenzuela Story	young Lucy	
2017	Super Ma'am	Katrina "Katitay" Magbanua	
2018	Magpakailanman: Ang Babaeng Tinimbang Ngunit Sobra: The Melinda Mara Story	young Melody	
2018	Magpakailanman: Ang Batang Hindi Tumatanda: The Justin Amar Story	young Jasmin	
2018	Tadhana: Pinalayas si Inay	Hope	
2018	My Guitar Princess	Kim	
2018	Asawa Ko, Karibal Ko	young Allison Bravante	
2018–2023	Daig Kayo ng Lola Ko	Various roles	
2019	Maynila: Bubble Gum Romance	Nida	
2019	Kara Mia	Estrella "Star" Machado Lacson	
2019–2022	Prima Donnas	Donna Belle "Ella" Madreal Claveria	
2020	Maynila: Stage Mom-ager	Aubrey	
2020	Maynila: Three Little Suitors	Hanah	
2020	Magpakailanman: The Haunted Daughter	Rona	
2021	Magpakailanman: Our Abusive Father	Luna	
2021	My Fantastic Pag-ibig: Fallen	Bituin	
2021	Agimat ng Agila	young Maya	
2021	The Lost Recipe	Ham	
2022	Regal Studio Presents: My Boss, My Love	Joy	
2022	Tadhana: Ina, Anak, Asawa	young Jessica	
2022	Tadhana: Isabella	Isabella Bermudez	
2022	Regal Studio Presents: Win a Date	Kylie	
2022	Mano Po Legacy: The Flower Sisters	young Violet	
2022	Happy Together	June	
2022	Pepito Manaloto	Ely	
2023	Regal Studio Presents: Mama's Joy	Joy	
2023	Tadhana: My Golden Love	Arlene	
2023	AraBella	Jonalyn "Jona" Montecillo	
2023	AraBella	Bella Montecillo	
2023	Open 24/7	Mika	
2023	Lovers & Liars	young Via	
2024	Sparkle U: #SoundTrip	Alyssa Mae Geronimo	
2024	Forever Young	Raine Agapito	
2025	Maka	Katya Carida	
2025	Magpakailanman: Ang Inang Walang Puso	Casey	
2026	Tadhana: Perlas	Gina	
2026	Regal Studio Presents: Happy Retirement Day	Anna	
2026–present	ASAP XP	Herself / co-host / semi-regular performers	

== Accolades ==
Award	Year	Category	Nominated work	Result	Ref.
Solid Kapuso Latest Updates (SKLU) Awards	2019	Best Kapuso Actress of the Yea	Prima Donnas	Won	
35th PMPC Star Awards for Television	2023	Best Daytime Drama Series	Prima Donnas	Won	
