= Asawa Ko, Karibal Ko =

Philippine television drama series

- Title card
- Also known as: Silent Shadow
- Genre: Drama
- Created by: Marlon Miguel
- Written by: Richard "Dode" Cruz; Marlon Miguel; Renato Custodio
- Directed by: Mark Sicat dela Cruz
- Creative director: Roy C. Iglesias
- Starring: Kris Bernal; Thea Tolentino; Rayver Cruz
- Theme music composer: Francis "Kiko" Salazar
- Opening theme: "Bukas na Lang" by Kyline Alcantara
- Country of origin: Philippines
- Original language: Tagalog
- No. of episodes: 114 (list of episodes)

Production
- Executive producer: Reylie F. Manalo
- Editors: Nikka Olayvar-Unson; Lara Linsangan; Maita Dator-Causapin
- Camera setup: Multiple-camera setup
- Running time: 25–34 minutes
- Production company: GMA Entertainment Group

Original release
- Network: GMA Network
- Release: October 22, 2018 – March 2, 2019

Asawa Ko, Karibal Ko (transl. my spouse, my rival / international title: Silent Shadow) is a Philippine television drama series broadcast by GMA Network. Directed by Mark Sicat dela Cruz, it stars Kris Bernal, Thea Tolentino and Rayver Cruz. It premiered on October 22, 2018 on the network's Afternoon Prime and Sabado Star Power sa Hapon line up. The series concluded on March 2, 2019, with a total of 114 episodes.

The series is originally titled as The Betrayed Wife and later Mag-asawa, Magkaribal. The series is streaming online on YouTube.

== Premise ==
Rachel meets Nathan, a gay man who later marries her due to family's pressure. Unhappy and trapped, Nathan plots his fake death and later undergoes to a sexual reassignment and face surgery in another country. Years later, Rachel meets Gavin and falls for him. Gavin has a wife, Venus whom Rachel will eventually find out to be her former husband.

== Cast and characters ==
Cast

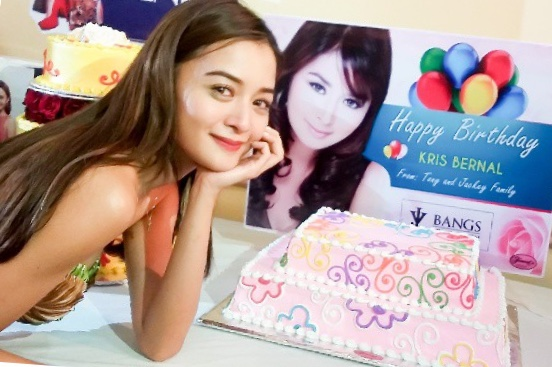
Kris Bernal

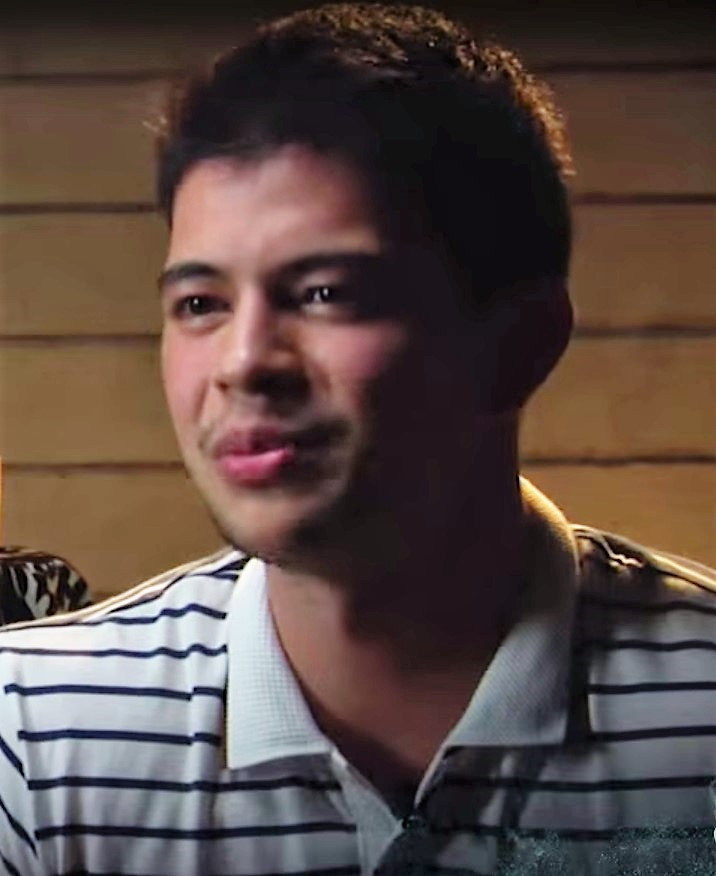
Rayver Cruz

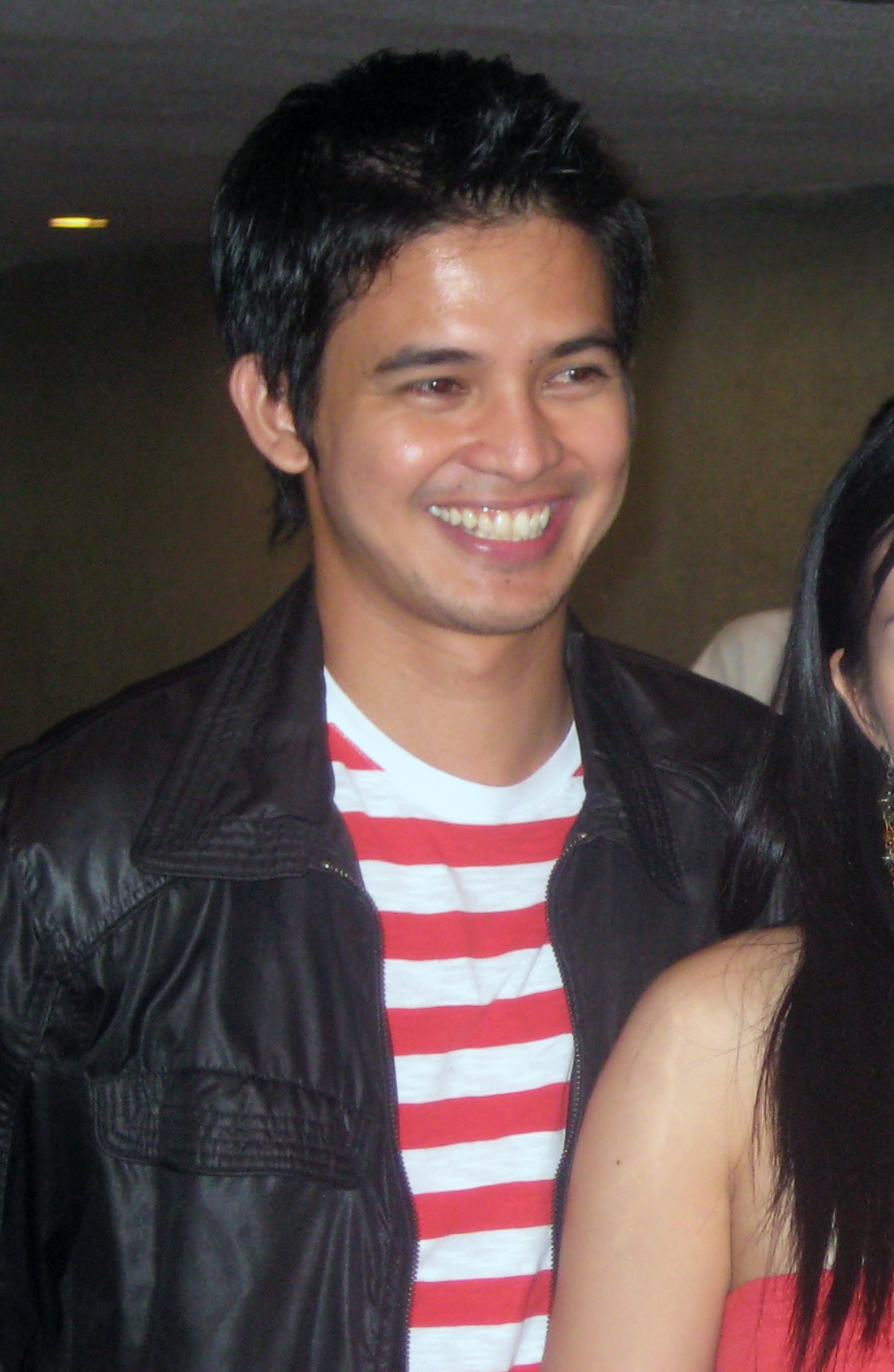
Jason Abalos

Lead cast

- Kris Bernal as Rachel Santiago-Bravante
- Thea Tolentino as Venus Hermosa-Bravante / Nathan Bravante / Catriona
- Rayver Cruz as Gavin Corpus

Supporting cast

- Lotlot de Leon as Lupita Santiago
- Devon Seron as Maya Santiago
- Jean Saburit as Veronica delos Santos-Bravante
- Ricardo Cepeda as Lorenzo Bravante
- Maricris Garcia as Allison "Alice S." Bravante
- Matthias Rhoads as Daniel Lindberg
- Phil Noble as Krissy
- Analyn Barro as Tina Santos-Santiago
- Caprice Cayetano as Nicole Belle S. Bravante

Guest cast

- Jason Abalos as Nathan Bravante / Catriona
- Rob Sy as Arnold dela Cruz
- Alma Moreno as Sarah Corpus
- Juancho Triviño as David Santiago
- Ranty Portento as Andrew
- Alvin Maghanoy as younger Nathan Bravante
- Adrian Pascual as teenage Nathan
- Ameera Johara as Janice
- Mela Habijan as Mela
- Althea Ablan as younger Allison
- Stanley Abuloc as Kyle Bravante
- Geraldine Villamil as Marie
- Xyruz Cruz as Paolo
- Chrome Prince Cosio as Frank
- David Uy as Stanley
- Rob Moya as Gio
- Andrew Gan as Julio
- Karlo Duterte as Ben
- Mike Liwag as a restaurant manager
- Kiel Rodriguez as Marasigan

== Production ==
Principal photography commenced on September 13, 2018. Filming concluded on February 20, 2019.

== Ratings ==
According to AGB Nielsen Philippines' Nationwide Urban Television Audience Measurement People in television homes, the pilot episode of Asawa Ko, Karibal Ko earned a 6.6% rating.

== Accolades ==
Accolades received by Asawa Ko, Karibal Ko
Year	Award	Category	Recipient	Result	Ref.
2019	13th UPLB Isko’t Iska Multi-media Awards!	Most Gender Transformative Program	Asawa Ko, Karibal Ko	Won	
2019	33rd PMPC Star Awards for Television	Best Daytime TV Series	Asawa Ko, Karibal Ko	Nominated	
2019	VP Choice Awards	TV Actress of the Year	Thea Tolentino	Nominated	
