= Rookie (2023 film) =

2023 film directed by Samantha Lee and Natts Jadaone

- Theatrical release poster
- Directed by: Samantha Lee
- Screenplay by: Natts Jadaone
- Produced by: Jan Pineda
- Starring: Pat Tingjuy; Aya Fernandez; Agot Isidro
- Cinematography: Choice Israel
- Edited by: Ilsa Malsi
- Music by: Len Calvo
- Production company: ANIMA Studios
- Release date: August 5, 2023
- Country: Philippines
- Language: Filipino

Rookie is a 2023 Philippine independent LGBT coming-of-age sports film directed by Samantha Lee and written by Natts Jadaone. It stars Pat Tingjuy, Aya Fernandez, and Agot Isidro. The film is about an awkward teenager who joins the volleyball team and falls for the volleyball team captain.

== Synopsis ==
On her initial day at San Lorenzo, an all-girls Catholic high school, the introverted transferee Ace (played by Pat Tingjuy) catches the attention of Coach Jules (played by Agot Isidro, San Lorenzo's volleyball team coach, who extends an invitation for her to participate in volleyball team tryouts after finding out that Ace is a talented basketball player.

Although Ace initially feels like she doesn't belong on the volleyball court, her perspective shifts when she develops feelings for Jana (played by Aya Fernandez), the team captain. However, Jana regards Ace as a rival and this alters their dynamic.

Over time, Ace forms bonds with Jana and the rest of her teammates, and thereby experiences a sense of liberation. Nevertheless, a pivotal after-game event involving the team's physical therapist Coach Kel (played by Mikoy Morales), ends up dramatically transforming Ace's life.

== Cast ==
- Pat Tingjuy as Ace
- Aya Fernandez as Jana
- Agot Isidro as Coach Jules
- Mikoy Morales as Coach Kel
- Che Ramos as Ace's mother
- Alyssa Valdez as herself (cameo role)
- Kirsten Ariana as one of the volleyball players (cameo role)

== Release ==
The film premiered at the 19th Cinemalaya Independent Film Festival on August 5, 2023, as one of the competing films under the full-length category. It went on to win three awards at the festival: Best Actress for Pat Tingjuy's performance; Audience Choice Award; and Best Editing.
