= Ryan Machado =

Filipino playwwright and film director

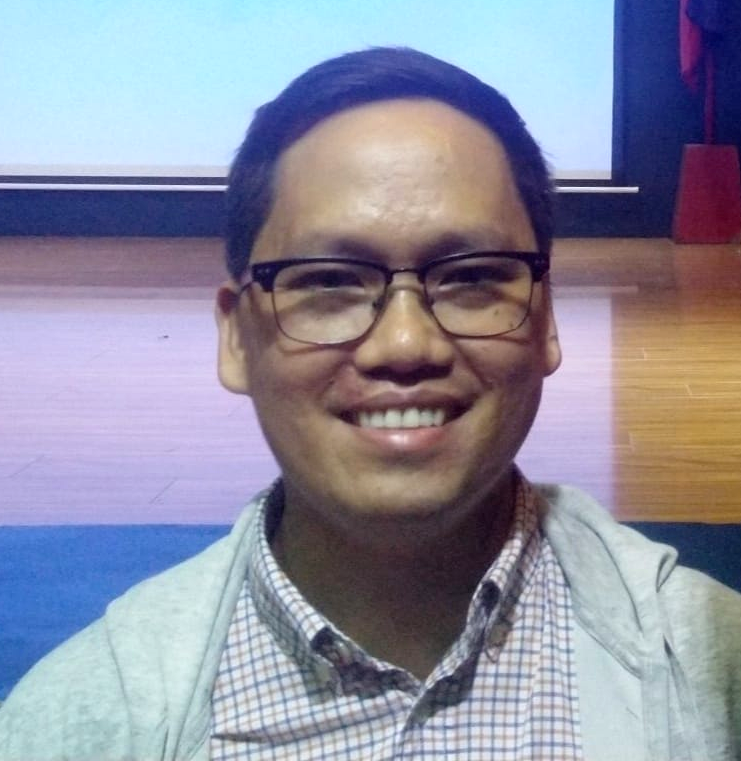
- Ryan Machado
- Born: Ryan Espinosa Machado; Romblon, Philippines
- Occupations: Film director, playwright
- Years active: 2017-present
- Known for: Huling Palabas, Rumaragasa
- Awards: Palanca Awards (2014, third prize), Cinemalaya Film Festival (2023, Best Director)

Ryan Machado is a Filipino film director. He won the 2024 Cinemalaya Best Director for "Huling Palabas".

== Biography ==
He was born and raised in the island province of Romblon.

He is a professor of Philippine Arts & Culture and Film at the University of the Philippines Manila. He is currently taking up his MFA in Creative Writing at the De La Salle University.

== Career ==
=== Theater ===
He won third prize for his one-act play "Huling Haraya nina Ischia at Emeteria" at the Don Carlos Palanca Memorial Awards for Literature. It was staged that same year at the Virgin Labfest 17 of the Cultural Center of the Philippines.

In 2025, his "Don't Meow for Me, Catriona" was staged at the 20th edition of the CCP's Virgin Labfest. The play starred veteran actress Peewee O'Hara and film actress Angelica Panganiban, in her theater debut and also her public performance in years.

=== Movies ===
He wrote and directed his first full-length movie Huling Palabas, a queer coming-of-age film, which premiered at the 19th Cinemalaya Film Festival where he won the Best Director award at the same festival. Machado has said that he intended the movie to be a tribute to the film-viewing culture in his hometown, as well as a way to feature his province. The film is also notable for being the first full-length feature film set in his native language Onhan. Huling Palabas later had its first international premiere at the 74th Berlin International Film Festival, where it competed at the Generation 14plus category.

His second film, Rumaragasa, premiered at the 21st Cinemalaya Film Festival, where it won for Best Cinematography and Best Sound. The film is based on a plane crash and a sexual abuse case which both happened in his home province. It was again selected to be in competition at the 76th Berlin International Film Festival (at the Panorama category). The movie was selected as one of the participating Filipino movies in the 23rd Asian Film Festival in Rome; in the same festival, Machado won Best Director.

== Works ==
=== Theater ===
- Huling Haraya nina Ischia at Emeteria - 2022 Don Carlos Palanca Memorial Award for Literature (3rd Place, Dulang May Isang Yugto), Virgin Labfest 17
- Don't Meow for Me, Catriona - Virgin Labfest 20 (2025)

=== Filmography ===
Year	Original title	English title	Director	Writer	Editor	Notes
2017	Engkwento	-	Yes	Yes	Yes	short film
2017	Swiss Side	-	No	Yes	Yes	short film
2023	Huling Palabas	Fin / Love and Videotapes	Yes	Yes	No	2023 Cinemalaya Film Festival
2025	Rumaragasa	Raging	Yes	Yes	Yes	2025 Cinemalaya Film Festival

== Awards ==
Organization	Year	Nominated Work	Category	Result	Ref.
FAMAS Awards	2014	Engkwento	Best Short Film	Nominated	
Don Carlos Palanca Memorial Awards for Literature	2022	Huling Haraya nina Ischia at Emeteria	Dulang May Isang Yugto	Won (Third Place)	
Berlin International Film Festival	2024	Huling Palabas	Best Film (Teddys)	Nominated	
Berlin International Film Festival	2024	Huling Palabas	Best Film (Generation 14 plus)	Nominated	
Young Critics Circle	2024	Huling Palabas	Best First Feature (tied with "Gitling")	Won	
Young Critics Circle	2024	Huling Palabas	Best Screenplay	Nominated	
Young Critics Circle	2024	Huling Palabas	Best Film	Won	
Cinemalaya Film Festival	2024	Huling Palabas	Best Director	Won	
Cinemalaya Film Festival	2024	Huling Palabas	Best Film	Nominated	
Society of Filipino Film Reviewers	2024	Huling Palabas	Best Film	Won	
Society of Filipino Film Reviewers	2024	Huling Palabas	Best Director	Nominated	
Society of Filipino Film Reviewers	2024	Huling Palabas	Best Screenplay	Won (Second Place)	
Society of Filipino Film Reviewers	2024	Huling Palabas	Best First Feature	Won (Second Place)	
Society of Filipino Film Reviewers	2025	Rumaragasa	Best Director	Nominated	
23rd Asian Film Festival (Rome)	2026	Rumaragasa	Best Director	Won	
