= AraBella (Philippine TV series) =

2023 Philippine television drama series

- Title card
- Genre: Drama
- Created by: Patrick Ilagan
- Written by: Onay Sales-Camero; Renato Custodio; Patrick Louie Ilagan; Wiro Michael Ladera
- Directed by: Adolf Alix, Jr.
- Creative director: Aloy Adlawan
- Starring: Shayne Sava; Althea Ablan
- Opening theme: "Wala Nang Ibang Dahilan" by Zephanie Dimaranan
- Country of origin: Philippines
- Original language: Tagalog
- No. of episodes: 78

Production
- Executive producer: Arlene Del Rosario-Pilapil
- Camera setup: Multiple-camera setup
- Running time: 23–32 minutes
- Production company: GMA Entertainment Group

Original release
- Network: GMA Network
- Release: March 6 – June 23, 2023

AraBella is a 2023 Philippine television drama series broadcast by GMA Network. Directed by Adolf Alix Jr., it stars Shayne Sava and Althea Ablan both in the title roles. It premiered on March 6, 2023 on the network's Afternoon Prime line up. The series concluded on June 23, 2023, with a total of 78 episodes.

The series is streaming online on YouTube.

== Cast and characters ==
Cast

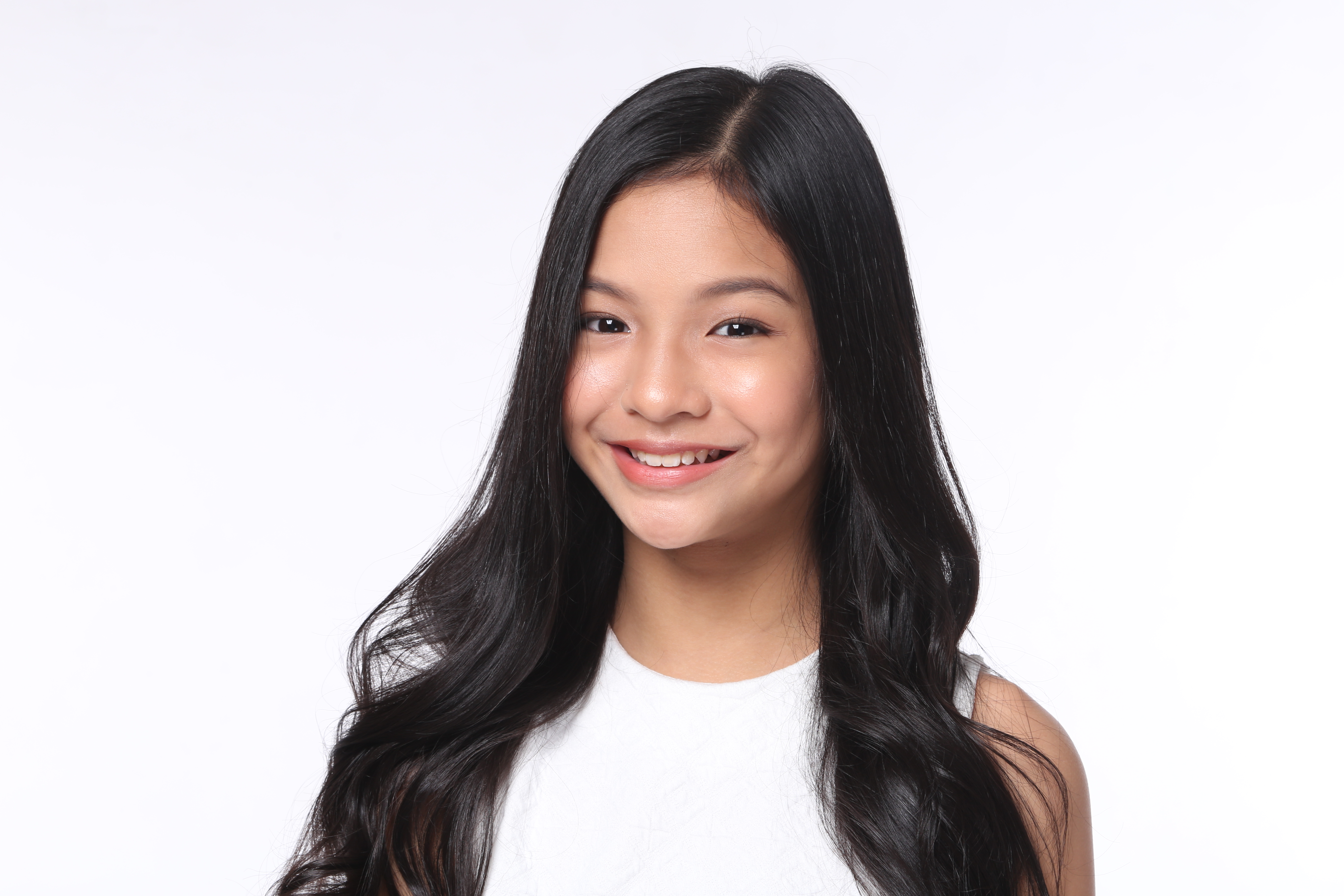
Althea Ablan

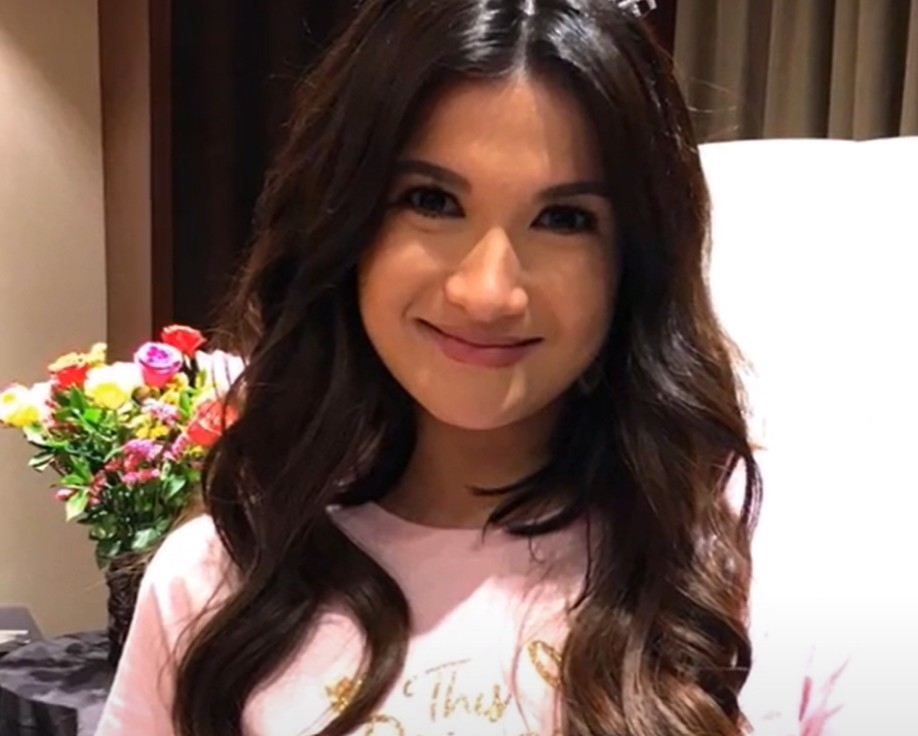
Camille Prats

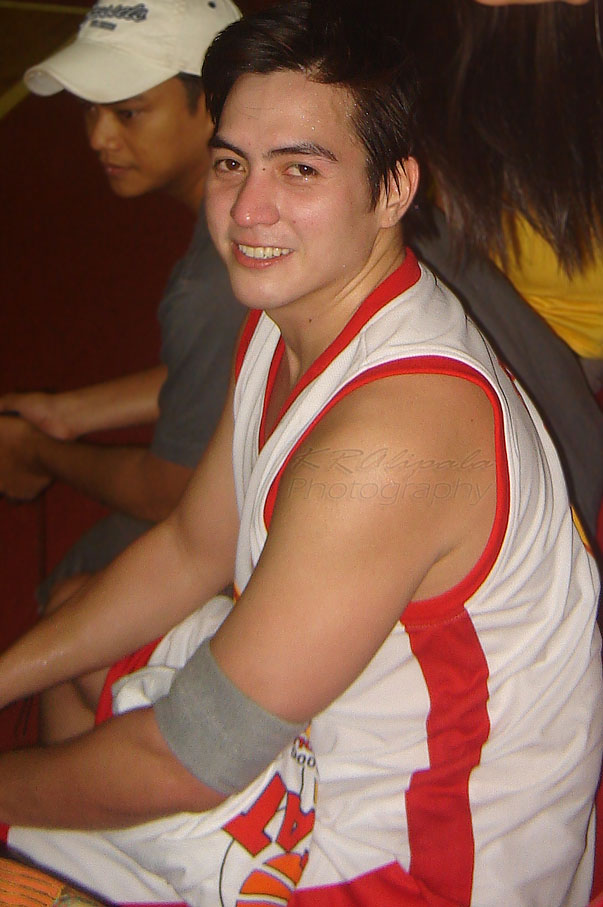
Wendell Ramos

Lead cast

- Shayne Sava as Amara "Ara" A. Montecillo / Angeline Manalo
- Althea Ablan as Jonalyn "Jona" A. Montecillo / Bella Montecillo

Supporting cast

- Camille Prats as Roselle Abad-Abarro
- Alfred Vargas as Ariel Abarro
- Klea Pineda as Gwendolyn "Gwen" V. Abad
- Wendell Ramos as Gary
- Abdul Raman as Justin
- Saviour Ramos as Ed
- Nova Villa as Madonna
- Ronnie Lazaro as Hadji
- Faye Lorenzo as Charice Decera
- Thia Thomalla as Asher
- Madelaine Nicolas as Vina
- Luis Hontiveros as Elton
- Mitzi Josh as Aicelle

Guest cast

- Ricardo Cepeda as Celso Abad
- Antonio Aquitania as Ronald "Ronnie" Sarmiento
- Brianna Advincula as younger Ara
- Juharra Asayo as younger Bella
- Luri Vincent Nalus as Jiro
- Marx Topacio as Jed
- Sherilyn Reyes-Tan as Nora Velasquez
- Seb Pajarillo as Jim
- Karennina Haniel as Lailani "Lani" Manalo
- Euleen Castro as Abba
- Jorrybell Agoto as Dara
- Aaron Hewson as John

== Production ==
Principal photography concluded in February 2023.

== Ratings ==
According to AGB Nielsen Philippines' Nationwide Urban Television Audience Measurement People in television homes, the pilot episode of AraBella earned an 8.8% rating.

== Accolades ==
Accolades received by AraBella
Year	Award	Category	Recipient	Result	Ref.
2025	37th PMPC Star Awards for Television	Best Daytime Drama Series	AraBella	Pending	
