= Twist of Faith (disambiguation) =

Twist of Faith is a 2004 American documentary film about a man who confronts the Catholic Church about the abuse he suffered as a teenager.

Twist of Faith may also refer to:

- A Twist of Faith, 1999 American film starring Andrew McCarthy
- Twist of Faith (2013 film), American Lifetime network television film
- Twist of Faith, 2007 Star Trek: Deep Space Nine novel by S.D. Perry, David Weddle and Jeffrey Lang, Keith DeCandido
- Twist of Faith: The Story of Anne Beiler, Founder of Auntie Anne's Pretzels, 2008 memoir by Anne F. Beiler with Shawn Smucker
- Twist of Faith, 2011 album by Norwegian metal band Highland Glory

== See also ==
- Twist of Fate (disambiguation)
