= Prima Donnas =

Philippine television drama series

- Season 2 title card
- Genre: Drama
- Created by: Maria Zita S. Garganera
- Written by: Luningning Interino-Ribay; Wiro Michael Ladera; John Borgy Danao; Maria Zita S. Garganera; Kuts Enriquez
- Directed by: Gina Alajar
- Creative director: Aloy Adlawan
- Starring: Jillian Ward; Althea Ablan; Sofia Pablo
- Theme music composer: Ann Margaret R. Figueroa
- Opening theme: "Huwag Kang Susuko" by Golden Cañedo; "Huwag Kang Susuko" by Jessica Villarubin
- Country of origin: Philippines
- Original language: Tagalog
- No. of seasons: 2
- No. of episodes: 311 (list of episodes)

Production
- Executive producer: Marissa Jesuitas-Hilario
- Camera setup: Multiple-camera setup
- Running time: 22–35 minutes
- Production company: GMA Entertainment Group

Original release
- Network: GMA Network
- Release: August 19, 2019 – April 30, 2022

Prima Donnas (transl. first Donnas) is a Philippine television drama series broadcast by GMA Network. Directed by Gina Alajar, it stars Jillian Ward, Althea Ablan and Sofia Pablo all in the title roles. It premiered on August 19, 2019, on the network's Afternoon Prime line up. The series concluded on April 30, 2022, with a total of two seasons and 311 episodes.

The series is streaming online on YouTube.

== Cast and characters ==
Cast

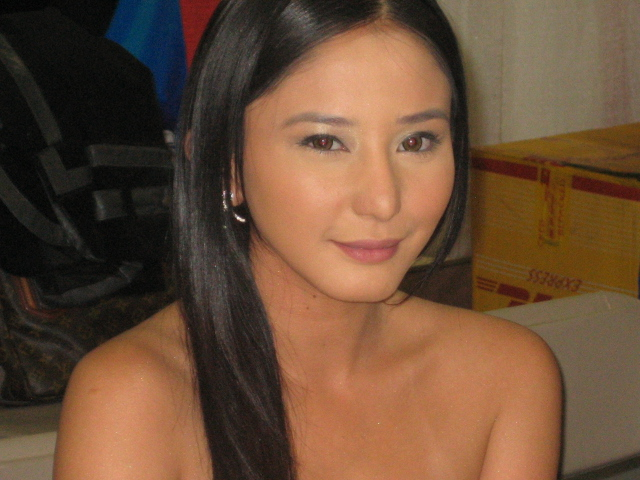
Katrina Halili

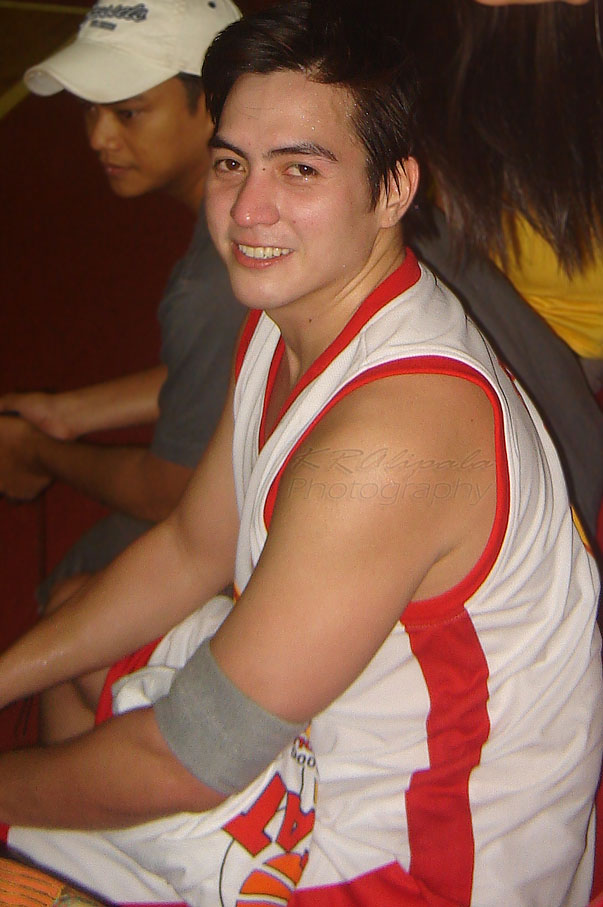
Wendell Ramos

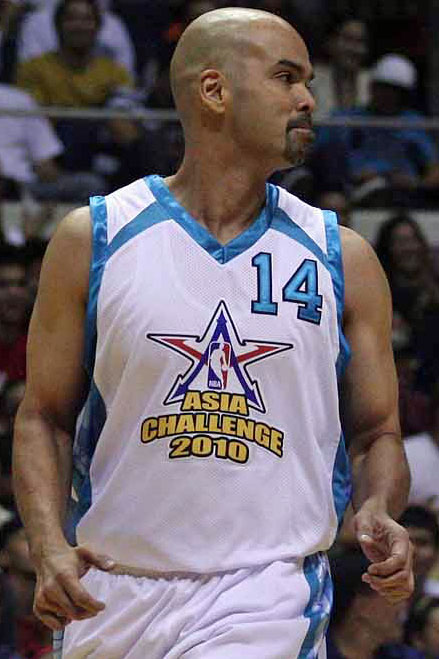
Benjie Paras

Lead cast

- Jillian Ward as Donna Marie "Mayi" M. Escalante
- Althea Ablan as Donna Belle "Ella" M. Claveria
- Sofia Pablo as Donna Lyn "Len-Len" M. Claveria

Supporting cast

- Katrina Halili as Lilian Madreal-Claveria
- Wendell Ramos as Jaime Antonio Claveria
- Chanda Romero as Lady Primarosa "Prima" Antonio-Claveria
- Benjie Paras as Agaton Salazar
- Aiko Melendez as Maria Kendra Fajardo
- Elijah Alejo as Brianna Elaine F. Dimaculangan/ Brianna Elaine M. Claveria
- James Blanco as Ruben Escalante
- Sheryl Cruz as Bethany "Betty" Fajardo-Howards / Maria Kendra Fajardo-Claveria
- Will Ashley as Nolan Dimasalang
- Vince Crisostomo as Cedric Villarazon
- Bruce Roeland as Hugo Almezen
- Allen Ansay as Alfonso "Fonsie" Serrano

Guest cast

- Glaiza de Castro as Maita Salazar-Claveria
- Irene Celebre as Irma Mendoza
- Mel Kimura as Carmencita "Mameng" Dela Cruz
- Eunice Lagusad as Judelita "Juday" Valdez
- Marcus Madrigal as Henry Dimaculangan
- Tina Paner as Aura
- Che Ramos as Darcy
- Diva Montelaba as Carla
- Renerich Ocon as Coring
- Geraldine Villamil as Anita
- Rob Sy as Edison
- Meng Canlas as Conching
- Maritess Samson as Sylvia
- Yuseff Estevez as Victor
- Angelica Ulip as younger Mayi
- Caprice Mendez as younger Ella
- Rein Adriano as younger Lenlen
- Jude De Jesus as younger Nolan
- Chrome Prince Cosio as Big Bogs
- Jemwell Ventinilla as Ziggy
- Julius Miguel as Uno
- Miggs Cuaderno as Coco
- Angelika Santiago as Jewel
- Dayara Shane as Erica
- Shanicka Arganda as Andi
- Judie Dela Cruz as Zita
- Anthony Falcon as Samuel
- Rob Sy as Edison
- Chanel Latorre as Dindi
- Sarah Carlos as Lorna/ Emerald
- Gilleth Sandico as Gwyneth

== Casting ==
On September 25, 2020, Sofia Pablo left the series due to community quarantine guidelines. She returned for the second season. Aiko Melendez left the series in October 2021, to pursue her political career in Quezon City.

== Production ==
Principal photography was halted on March 17, 2020, due to the enhanced community quarantine in Luzon caused by the COVID-19 pandemic. Filming was continued on September 28, 2020. The series resumed its programming on November 9, 2020.

Principal photography for the second season commenced on September 27, 2021.

== Ratings ==
According to AGB Nielsen Philippines' Nationwide Urban Television Audience Measurement People in television homes, the pilot episode of Prima Donnas earned a 4.9% rating. The first season's finale scored a 14.2% rating.

== Accolades ==
Accolades received by Prima Donnas
Year	Award	Category	Recipient	Result	Ref.
2020	RAWR Awards	Favorite Kontrabida	Aiko Melendez	Won	
2021	34th PMPC Star Awards for Television	Best Daytime Drama Series	Prima Donnas	Nominated	
2021	34th PMPC Star Awards for Television	Best Drama Supporting Actress	Aiko Melendez	Won	
2023	35th PMPC Star Awards for Television	Best Daytime Drama Series	Prima Donnas	Won	
