= 2023 Cinemalaya =

Filipino independent film festival

19th Cinemalaya Independent Film Festival
- Official festival poster
- Opening film: Where is the Lie? (Marupok AF) by Quark Henares
- Closing film: Third World Romance by Dwein Baltazar
- Location: Metro Manila, Philippines
- Film titles: 20
- Festival date: August 4–13, 2023
- Language: English, Filipino, Hiligaynon, Ilocano, Romblomanon, Davaoeño, etc.
- Website: www.cinemalaya.org

Cinemalaya chronology
- 2024 2022

The 19th Cinemalaya Independent Film Festival was held from August 4 – 13, 2023 in Metro Manila, Philippines with the theme being “IlumiNasyon” (illumination). A total of ten full-length features and ten short films competed. The festival was opened by the film Where is the Lie? (Marupok AF) by Quark Henares and its closing film was Third World Romance by Dwein Baltazar. This year, the festival proper was held at the Philippine International Convention Center instead of the Cultural Center of the Philippines, its annual venue, due to the latter being under renovation until 2025.

During the press launch held on July 5, 2023, it was revealed by Cinemalaya Foundation president Laurice Guillen that each director in the feature-length category received a seed grant amounting to ₱2,000,000 (US$40,000~), the largest amount given in the history of the Festival. On the other hand, the finalists of the short film category received a total of ₱100,000 (US$1,785~) each for their finished films.

== Entries ==
The winning film is highlighted with boldface and a dagger.

=== Feature films ===
Title	Director	Cast	Genre	Notes
Ang Duyan ng Magiting (The Cradle of the Brave)	Dustin Celestino	Dolly de Leon, Bituin Escalante, Agot Isidro, Miggy Jimenez, Jojit Lorenzo, Frances Makil-Ignacio, Paolo O’Hara, Joel Saracho, and Dylan Ray Talon	Drama	
As if it's True	John Rogers	Khalil Ramos, Ashley Ortega, Adrianna So, John Silverio, Angellie Sanoy, Rachel Coates, and Marnie Lapus	Romance, Drama	
Bulawan Nga Usa (Golden Deer)	Kenneth de la Cruz	Ron Matthews Espinosa and John Niel Pagntalan	Drama, Fantasy	
Gitling (Hyphen)	Jopy Arnaldo	Gabby Padilla and Ken Yamamura	Dramedy	
Fin	Ryan Espinosa Machado	Shun Mark Gomez, Bon Andrew Lentejas, Cedrick Juan, Jay Gonzaga, Serena Magiliw, and Senandra Gomez	Drama, Coming-of-Age	
**Iti Mapukpukaw** ^{†}	Carl Joseph E. Papa	Carlo Aquino, Gio Gahol, and Dolly de Leon	Animation, Drama, Queer	Iti Mapukpukaw is the first full-length animated film to compete in the history of the Cinemalaya Independent Film Festival.
Maria	Sheryl Rose M. Andes	-	Documentary	Maria is the first full-length documentary to compete in the history of the Cinemalaya Independent Film Festival.
Rookie	Samantha Lee	Pat Tingjuy, Aya Fernandez, and Agot Isidro	Coming-of-age, Romantic, Comedy, LGBTQIA+, Sports	
Tether	Gian Arre	Mikoy Morales, Jorrybell Agoto, Breech Mae Valencia, Olivia Banela, and Albert Briones	Romance, Horror	
When This Is All Over	Kevin Mayuga	Juan Karlos Labajo, Jorrybell Agoto, Ana Abad Santos, Chaye Mogg, Nour Hooshmand, Jico Umali, Aaron Maniego, Renee Dominique, Lottie Bie, and Zara Loayan	Youth Drama	

=== Short films ===
Title	Director
Ang Kining Binalaybay Kag Ambanahon Para sa Imo	Kent John Desamparado
Golden Bells	Kurt Soberano
Hinakdal	Arvin Belarmino
Hm Hm Mhm	Sam Villa-real and Kim Timan
Kokuryo: The Untold Story of Bb. Undas 2019	Diokko Manuel Dionisio
Makoko sa Baybay	Mike Cabarles
Maudi nga Arapaap	Daniel Magayon
**Sibuyas ni Perfecto** ^{†}	Januar Yap
Sota	Mae Tanagon
'Tong Adlaw nga Nag-snow sa Pinas	Joshua Caesar Medroso

== Awards ==
The awards ceremony was held on August 13, 2023, at the Philippine International Convention Center.

Under the full-length feature category, Iti Mapukpukaw won Best Film along with the special NETPAC award. Dolly de Leon also received the Best Supporting Actress award for her performance in the film. The films Rookie and When This Is All Over each won three awards, with the former receiving the Best Actress award for Pat Tingjuy's performance, the Audience Choice Award, and Best Editing, and the latter receiving Best Cinematography, Best Production Design, and Best Original Music Score.

Under the short film category, Hinakdal won the most awards with three: Audience Choice Award, Best Screenplay, and the short film counterpart of the NETPAC Award. Meanwhile, Sibuyas ni Perfecto won Best Film.

The complete list of winning films are as follows:

=== Feature films ===
- Best Film – Iti Mapukpukaw by Carl Joseph E. Papa
  - Special Jury Award – Ang Duyan ng Magiting by Dustin Celestino
  - Audience Choice Award – Rookie by Samantha Lee
- Best Direction – Ryan Espinosa Machado for Fin
- Best Actor – Mikoy Morales for Tether
- Best Actress – Pat Tingjuy for Rookie
- Best Supporting Actor – Bon Andrew Lentejas for Fin
- Best Supporting Actress – Dolly de Leon for Iti Mapukpukaw
- Best Screenplay – Jopy Arnaldo for Gitling
- Best Cinematography – Martika Ramirez Escobar for When This Is All Over
- Best Editing – Ilsa Malsi for Rookie
- Best Sound Design – Gian Arre for Tether
- Best Original Music Score – KINDRED for When This Is All Over
- Best Production Design – Kaye Banaag for When This Is All Over

=== Short films ===
- Best Film – Sibuyas ni Perfecto by Januar Yap
  - Special Jury Award – Hm Hm MhM by Sam Villa-real and Kim Timan
  - Audience Choice Award – Hinakdal by Arvin Belarmino
- Best Screenplay – Hinakdal by Arvin Belarmino
- Best Direction – Mike Cabarles for Makoko Sa Baybay

=== Special awards ===
- NETPAC Full-length Feature Award: Iti Mapukpukaw by Carl Joseph E. Papa
- NETPAC Short Film Award: Hinakdal by Arvin Belarmino
