= List of Asawa Ko, Karibal Ko episodes =

Philippine television series

Asawa Ko, Karibal Ko (international title: Silent Shadow / transl. My Spouse, My Rival) is a 2018 Philippine drama television series starring Kris Bernal, Rayver Cruz and Thea Tolentino. The series premiered on GMA Network's GMA Afternoon Prime and Sabado Star Power sa Hapon block and worldwide via GMA Pinoy TV from October 22, 2018, to March 2, 2019, replacing The Stepdaughters, which aired on Ika-5 Utos timeslot.

NUTAM (Nationwide Urban Television Audience Measurement) People in Television Homes ratings are provided by AGB Nielsen Philippines. The series ended, but its the 19th-week run, and with a total of 114 episodes. It was replaced by Dragon Lady.

== Series overview ==
Season	Episodes	Originally released	
Season	Episodes	First released	Last released
1	114	October 22, 2018	March 2, 2019

== Episodes ==
=== October 2018 ===
Episode		Original air date	Social media hashtag	AGB Nielsen NUTAM People			ProdCode	Ref.
Episode		Original air date	Social media hashtag	Audience Share	Timeslot rank	Whole day rank	ProdCode	Ref.
1	"Pilot"	October 22, 2018	#AsawaKoKaribalKo	6.6%	#1		101 - A	
2	"Secret Identity"	October 23, 2018	#AKKKSecretIdentity	5.5%	#2		102 - B	
3	"Pagtatago" (Secret)	October 24, 2018	#AKKKPagtatago	5.9%	#1		103 - C	
4	"Lipstick"	October 25, 2018	#AKKKLipstick	6.2%	#1		104 - D	
5	"Baby"	October 26, 2018	#AKKKBaby	6.3%	#1		105 - E	
6	"Walang Kawala" (No Escape)	October 27, 2018	#AKKKWalangKawala	6.8%	#1		106 - F	
7	"Katotohanan" (Truth)	October 29, 2018	#AKKKKatotohanan	6.7%	#1		108 - H	
8	"Susi" (Key)	October 30, 2018	#AKKKSusi	6.9%	#1		107 - G	
9	"Hiwalayan" (Separation)	October 31, 2018	#AKKKHiwalayan	6.6%	#1		109 - I	
Average				6.4%				

=== November 2018 ===
Episode		Original air date	Social media hashtag	AGB Nielsen NUTAM People in Television Homes			ProdCode	Ref.
Episode		Original air date	Social media hashtag	Rating	Timeslot rank	Whole day rank	ProdCode	Ref.
10	"Pagtakas" (Escape)	November 1, 2018	#AKKKPagtakas	5.8%	#1		110 - J	
11	"Habulin si Nathan" (Chase Nathan)	November 2, 2018	#AKKKHabulinSiNathan	5.6%	#2		111 - K	
12	"Mapait na Kapalaran" (Bitter Fate)	November 3, 2018	#AKKKMapaitNaKapalaran	5.9%	#1		113 - M	
13	"Buntis" (Pregnant)	November 5, 2018	#AKKKBuntis	5.8%	#2		112 - L	
14	"Nathan to Catriona"	November 6, 2018	#AKKKNathanToCatriona	6.0%	#1		114 - N	
15	"Episode 15"	November 7, 2018	#AsawaKoKaribalKo	6.2%	#1		115 - O	
16	"Moving On"	November 8, 2018	#AKKKMovingOn	6.4%	#1		116 - P	
17	"Pagtatagpo" (Encounter)	November 9, 2018	#AKKKPagtatagpo	6.3%	#2		117 - Q	
18	"Bagong Mundo" (New World)	November 10, 2018	#AKKKBagongMundo	5.9%	#2		118 - R	
19	"Gavin Meets Rachel"	November 12, 2018	#AKKKGavinMeetsRachel	5.7%	#2		119 - S	
20	"Paglalapit" (Approach)	November 13, 2018	#AKKKPaglalapit	6.1%	#2		120 - T	
21	"Rachel and Venus"	November 14, 2018	#AKKKRachelAndVenus	6.4%	#1		122 - V	
22	"Venus in the Philippines"	November 15, 2018	#AKKKVenusInThePhils	6.0%	#2		121 - U	
23	"Unexpected"	November 16, 2018	#AKKKUnexpected	5.9%	#2		123 - W	
24	"Struggle"	November 17, 2018	#AKKKStruggle	6.4%	#1		124 - X	
25	"Ang Paghaharap" (The Confrontation)	November 19, 2018	#AKKKAngPaghaharap	6.2%	#2		125 - Y	
26	"Stalker"	November 20, 2018	#AKKKStalker	5.8%	#2		126 - Z	
27	"Belle"	November 21, 2018	#AKKKBelle	5.7%	#2		127 - AA	
28	"Finding Belle"	November 22, 2018	#AKKKFindingBelle	5.8%	#1		128 - BB	
29	"Real Mom"	November 23, 2018	#AKKKRealMom	5.5%	#1		129 - CC	
30	"Kampihan" (Take Part)	November 24, 2018	#AKKKKampihan	6.4%	#1		130 - DD	
31	"Bravantes"	November 26, 2018	#AKKKBravantes	6.1%	#2		131 - EE	
32	"Showdown"	November 27, 2018	#AKKKShowdown	5.8%	#2		133 - GG	
33	"Selosan" (Enviousness)	November 28, 2018	#AKKKSelosan	5.9%	#1		132 - FF	
34	"Set Up"	November 29, 2018	#AKKKSetUp	6.3%	#1		134 - HH	
35	"Patibong" (Trap)	November 30, 2018	#AKKKPatibong	6.5%	#1		135 - II	
Average				6.0%				

=== December 2018 ===
Episode		Original air date	Social media hashtag	AGB Nielsen NUTAM People			ProdCode	Ref.
Episode		Original air date	Social media hashtag	Audience Share	Timeslot rank	Whole day rank	ProdCode	Ref.
36	"Kasabwat" (Accomplice)	December 1, 2018	#AKKKKasabwat	5.6%	#2		136 - JJ	
37	"Heartbreak"	December 3, 2018	#AKKKHeartbreak	5.0%	#2		137 - KK	
38	"Huli" (Caught)	December 4, 2018	#AKKKHuli	5.5%	#2		138 - LL	
39	"Pagtalikod" (Turning Away)	December 5, 2018	#AKKKPagtalikod	5.6%	#1		139 - MM	
40	"Obligasyon" (Obligation)	December 6, 2018	#AKKKObligasyon	5.8%	#2		140 - NN	
41	"Buking" (Caught)	December 7, 2018	#AKKKBuking	6.0%	#1		142 - PP	
42	"Cornered"	December 8, 2018	#AKKKCornered	5.7%	#2		141 - OO	
43	"Pagtatagpo" (Encounter)	December 10, 2018	#AKKKPagtatagpo	6.4%	#1		143 - QQ	
44	"Yakap" (Hug)	December 11, 2018	#AKKKYakap	5.6%	#1		144 - RR	
45	"Rebelasyon" (Revelation)	December 12, 2018	#AKKKRebelasyon	6.0%	#1		145 - SS	
46	"Episode 46"	December 13, 2018	#AsawaKoKaribalKo	5.7%	#1		146 - TT	
47	"Bloodmatch"	December 14, 2018	#AKKKBloodmatch	5.3%	#1		147 - UU	
48	"Sacrifice"	December 15, 2018	#AKKKSacrifice	6.0%	#1		149 - WW	
49	"Pangliligaw" (Courtship)	December 17, 2018	#AKKKPangliligaw				148 - VV	
50	"Ganti" (Revenge)	December 18, 2018	#AKKKGanti				150 - XX	
51	"Fake"	December 19, 2018	#AKKKFake				151 - YY	
52	"Apektado" (Affected)	December 20, 2018	#AKKKApektado				152 - ZZ	
53	"Daniel is Back"	December 21, 2018	AKKKDanielIsBack				153 - AAA	
54	"Multo ni Catriona" (Catriona's Ghost)	December 22, 2018	#AKKKMultoNiCatriona				154 - BBB	
55	"Rachel Confronts Daniel"	December 24, 2018	#AKKKRachelConfrontsDaniel				156 - DDD	
56	"Venus Beastmode"	December 25, 2018	#AKKKVenusBeastmode				155 - CCC	
57	"Paranoid"	December 26, 2018	#AKKKParanoid				157 - EEE	
58	"Daniel's Decision"	December 27, 2018	#AKKKDanielsDecision				158 - FFF	
59	"Pagmamakaawa" (Supplication)	December 28, 2018	#AKKKPagmamakaawa				159 - GGG	
60	"The Confession"	December 29, 2018	#AKKKTheConfession				160 - HHH	
61	"Lumiliit na Mundo" (Small World)	December 31, 2018	#AKKKLumiliitNaMundo				161 - III	
Average								

=== January 2019 ===
Episode		Original air date	Social media hashtag	AGB Nielsen NUTAM People in Television Homes			Ref.
Episode		Original air date	Social media hashtag	Rating	Timeslot rank	Whole day rank	Ref.
62	"Bagong Kasinungalingan" (New Lies)	January 1, 2019	#AKKKBagongKasinungalingan				
63	"Suspicious Connections"	January 2, 2019	#AKKKSuspiciousConnections				
64	"Under Pressure"	January 3, 2019	#AKKKUnderPressure				
65	"Wagi" (Winner)	January 4, 2019	#AKKKWagi				
66	"Engaged"	January 5, 2019	#AKKKEngaged				
67	"Pagharang" (Blocking)	January 7, 2019	#AKKKPagharang	5.5%	#1		
68	"Hostage"	January 8, 2019	#AKKKHostage	5.7%	#2		
69	"Pagtatangka" (Attempt)	January 9, 2019	#AKKKPagtatangka	5.8%	#1		
70	"Takbo, Daniel, Takbo" (Run, Daniel, Run)	January 10, 2019	#AKKKTakboDanielTakbo	6.0%	#1		
71	"Ako si Nathan" (I'm Nathan)	January 11, 2019	#AKKKAkoSiNathan	6.3%	#1		
72	"Ebidensya" (Evidence)	January 12, 2019	#AKKKEbidensya	6.0%	#1		
73	"Daniel"	January 14, 2019	#AKKKDaniel	5.3%	#2		
74	"Suspek" (Suspect)	January 15, 2019	#AKKKSuspek				
75	"Scapegoat"	January 16, 2019	#AKKKScapegoat				
76	"Hustisya" (Justice)	January 17, 2019	#AKKKHustisya				
77	"Bakas" (Trace)	January 18, 2019	#AKKKBakas				
78	"Alibi"	January 19, 2019	#AKKKAlibi	7.0%	#1		
79	"Pagbawi" (Recovery)	January 21, 2019	#AKKKPagbawi	6.8%	#1		
80	"Proteksyon" (Protection)	January 22, 2019	#AKKKProteksyon	6.1%	#1		
81	"Cornered"	January 23, 2019	#AKKKCornered	5.7%	#1		
82	"Home Care"	January 24, 2019	#AKKKHomeCare	5.4%	#2		
83	"Call for Help"	January 25, 2019	#AKKKCallForHelp	6.1%	#1		
84	"Saksi" (Witness)	January 26, 2019	#AKKKSaksi	5.8%	#1		
85	"Takbo, Sarah" (Run, Sarah)	January 28, 2019	#AKKKTakboSarah	5.9%	#1		
86	"Secret Reveal"	January 29, 2019	#AKKKSecretReveal				
87	"Danger"	January 30, 2019	#AKKKDanger	6.1%	#1		
88	"Sukdulan" (Extremity)	January 31, 2019	#AKKKSukdulan				
Average							

=== February 2019 ===
Episode		Original air date	Social media hashtag	AGB Nielsen NUTAM People			Ref.
Episode		Original air date	Social media hashtag	Audience Share	Timeslot rank	Whole day rank	Ref.
89	"Paalam" (Goodbye)	February 1, 2019	#AKKKPaalam	7.5%	#1		
90	"Alarmed"	February 2, 2019	#AKKKAlarmed	7.6%	#1		
91	"Paranoia"	February 4, 2019	#AKKKParanoia	6.4%	#1		
92	"Explosion"	February 5, 2019	#AKKKExplosion	7.4%	#1		
93	"Unlock"	February 6, 2019	#AKKKUnlock	6.4%	#1		
94	"Pagbawi" (Recovery)	February 7, 2019	#AKKKPagbawi	6.0%	#1		
95	"Clues"	February 8, 2019	#AKKKClues	5.8%	#1		
96	"Anklet"	February 9, 2019	#AKKKAnklet	7.0%	#1		
97	"Confirmation"	February 11, 2019	#AKKKConfirmation	5.7%	#1		
98	"Mother's Instinct"	February 12, 2019	#AKKKMothersInstinct	6.2%	#1		
99	"Desperada" (Desperate)	February 13, 2019	#AKKKDesperada	6.4%	#1		
100	"DNA"	February 14, 2019	#AKKKDNA	6.4%	#1		
101	"Dead End"	February 15, 2019	#AKKKDeadEnd	6.7%	#1		
102	"Pagbawi" (Recovery)	February 16, 2019	#AKKKPagbawi	7.5%	#1		
103	"Family"	February 18, 2019	#AKKKFamily	7.6%	#1		
104	"Meltdown"	February 19, 2019	#AKKKMeltdown	7.0%	#1		
105	"Goodbye"	February 20, 2019	#AKKKGoodbye	6.9%	#1		
106	"Wedding Countdown"	February 21, 2019	#AKKKWeddingCountdown	7.1%	#1		
107	"Gender Issue"	February 22, 2019	#AKKKGenderIssue	7.3%	#1		
108	"Itigil ang Kasal" (Stop the Wedding)	February 23, 2019	#AKKKItigilAngKasal	8.0%	#1		
109	"Consequences"	February 25, 2019	#AKKKConsequences	8.3%	#1		
110	"Nathan is Venus"	February 26, 2019	#AKKKNathanIsVenus	8.2%	#1		
111	"Banta ni Venus" (Venus' Threat)	February 27, 2019	#AKKKBantaNiVenus	8.0%	#1		
112	"Amok" (Rage)	February 28, 2019	#AKKKAmok	7.9%	#1		
Average				7.1%			

=== March 2019 ===
Episode		Original air date	Social media hashtag	AGB Nielsen NUTAM People			Ref.
Episode		Original air date	Social media hashtag	Audience Share	Timeslot rank	Whole day rank	Ref.
113	"Kabayaran" (Payback)	March 1, 2019	#AKKKKabayaran	6.6%	#1		
114	"Finale"	March 2, 2019	#AKKKFinale	6.8%	#2		
Average				6.7%			
