= Twist of Fate =

Twist of Fate may refer to:

== Film and television ==
- Twist of Fate (1954 film), British-American mystery
- Twist of Fate, 1998 Canadian-American thriller, a/k/a Psychopath, with Mädchen Amick
- Twist of Fate (1989 TV series), British drama TV miniseries
- Twist of Fate (2011 TV series), American documentary
- Twist of Fate (2016 TV series), Indian English-language soap opera
- Twist of Fate, international name of 2014 Indian television series Kumkum Bhagya
- "Twist of Fate" (Atlantis), a 2013 television episode

== Music ==
- "Twist of Fate" (Olivia Newton-John song), 1983
- "Twist of Fate" (Emilia Rydberg song), 1998
- "Twist of Fate" (Siobhán Donaghy song), 2003
- A Twist of Fate, 2003 EP by John Arch
- Twist of Fate, a 2010 single by Bad Lieutenant also featured on the 2009 album Never Cry Another Tear

== Other ==
- Twist of Fate, professional wrestling move variation of cutter, popularized by The Hardy Boyz, consisting of Jeff Hardy and Matt Hardy

== See also ==
- A Simple Twist of Fate, 1994 American comedy-drama vehicle for Steve Martin
- Twist of Faith (disambiguation)
