= Fin (2023 film) =

2023 Philippines mystery drama film

- Theatrical release poster
- Filipino: Huling Palabas
- Literally: Last Show
- Directed by: Ryan Machado
- Written by: Ryan Machado
- Produced by: Cris Bringas; Jalz Zarate
- Starring: Shun Mark Gomez; Bon Andrew Lentejas; Cedrick Juan
- Cinematography: Theo Lozada
- Edited by: Cyril Bautista; Kurt Abrahan
- Music by: Erwin Fajardo
- Production companies: Tilt Studios; Terminal Six Post; WAF Studios; Studio Pulô
- Distributed by: Pluto Film
- Release dates: 5 August 2023 (Cinemalaya); 17 February 2024 (Berlinale)
- Running time: 97 minutes
- Country: Philippines
- Languages: Filipino; Onhan

Fin (Filipino: Huling Palabas) is a 2023 Philippine mystery drama film written and directed by Ryan Machado in his directorial debut. The film starring Shun Mark Gomez, Bon Andrew Lentej, and Cedrick Juan is about a 16-year-old boy in 2001 who, while searching for his father in the most unlikely of places, becomes mystified by two movie-like characters who appear in his small town.

It was selected in the Generation 14plus section at the 74th Berlin International Film Festival, where it has its International premiere on 17 February and compete for Crystal Bear for the Best Film.

== Synopsis ==
In search for his long-lost father, sixteen-year-old Andoy sees every film he watches as a potential clue to life's biggest mysteries—namely, the identity of his father and his own place in the world. Yet no matter how many imagined plots he spins, none lead to real answers. His search takes a curious turn when two enigmatic figures appear in his quiet hometown: Ariel, a magnetic hairdresser with an allure that draws young men, and Isidro, a shadowy, long-haired stranger with a prized VCD player. Captivated by both, Andoy is drawn into the unsettling orbit of their lives. As fiction and reality blur, he faces a pivotal choice—whether to bring his long pursuit of the truth to a dramatic close, or let it quietly fade.

== Cast ==
- Shun Mark Gomez as Andoy
- Bon Andrew Lentejas as Pido
- Cedrick Juan as Isidro
- Serena Magiliw as Ariel
- Jay Gonzaga as Julio
- Senanda as Fe
- Adelyn Fabon as Mrs. Tirol
- Glenn Mas as Mr. Rufon

== Release ==
Fin had its premiere at 19th Cinemalaya Independent Film Festival in Full-Length Features on 5 August 2023.

It had its International premiere on 17 February 2024, as part of the 74th Berlin International Film Festival, in Generation 14plus.

In February 2024, Pluto Film Film acquired the international sales rights of the film.

== Reception ==
Lida Bach reviewing in Movie Break rated the film 3.5/10 and giving negative review wrote, "The amateurish camera and scene design, the cramped acting and the visibly overwhelmed extras make the title a program."

== Accolades ==
Award	Date	Category	Recipient	Result	Ref.
Cinemalaya Independent Film Festival	13 August 2023	Best Director	Ryan Espinosa Machado	Won	
Cinemalaya Independent Film Festival	13 August 2023	Best Supporting Actor	Bon Andrew Lentejas	Won	
Berlin International Film Festival	25 February 2024	Generation 14plus Crystal Bear for Best Feature Film	Ryan Machado	Nominated	
Berlin International Film Festival	25 February 2024	Teddy Award for Best Feature Film	Ryan Machado	Nominated	
