= When This Is All Over =

2023 film directed by Kevin Mayuga

- Theatrical release poster
- Directed by: Kevin Mayuga
- Screenplay by: Abbey Mayuga-de Guia; Benedict O. Mendoza
- Produced by: Jan Pineda
- Starring: Juan Karlos Labajo
- Cinematography: Martika Ramirez-Escobar
- Edited by: Maria Estela Paiso
- Music by: Jorge Juan B.
- Production company: ANIMA
- Release date: August 4, 2023
- Country: Philippines
- Language: Filipino

When This Is All Over is a 2023 Philippine Independent coming-of-age drama film directed by Kevin Mayuga and written by Abbey Mayuga-de Guia and Benedict O. Mendoza. It stars Juan Karlos Labajo, Jorrybell Agoto, Ana Abad Santos. The film is about a disconnected young man, known as The Guy, who forges a deal with a group of privileged misfits to plan a secret party at the height of a global pandemic, for a chance to escape his reality.

== Plot ==
A young man known only as "The Guy" (Juan Karlos Labajo), who is confined to his upscale condominium in Manila during strict lockdown protocols. Disconnected and yearning to reunite with his mother in the United States, he turns to selling recreational drugs to affluent residents in his building to fund his escape.

The Guy's routine takes a turn when he is approached by Tanya (Nourijune Hooshmand) and Taylor (Chaye Mogg), two privileged residents eager to throw an illegal party to escape the monotony of quarantine life. Learning that Taylor has connections to the U.S. Embassy, The Guy offers to help organize the party in exchange for assistance with his visa application.

While scouting for a venue, The Guy frequently visits the building's rooftop to smoke, where he encounters Rosemarie (Jorrybell Agoto), a diligent and kind-hearted staff member. Despite initial friction, they develop a friendship that offers The Guy a sense of connection and grounding amidst the chaos.

As preparations for the clandestine party progress, The Guy becomes increasingly entangled in the hedonistic world of his wealthy clients. The event itself is a sensory overload, depicted through psychedelic visuals and a pulsating soundtrack that mirror The Guy's own drug-induced experiences. However, the aftermath is sobering, the party is discovered, leading to repercussions for the building's staff, including Rosemarie, who faces disciplinary action.

Confronted with the fallout of his actions and the stark disparities between the privileged residents and the hardworking staff, The Guy undergoes a period of introspection. He grapples with feelings of guilt and the realization that his pursuit of escape has come at the expense of others' well-being. In a poignant moment, he seeks out Rosemarie to apologize, only to find her expressionless, leaving the resolution of their relationship ambiguous.

== Cast ==
- Juan Karlos Labajo
- Jorrybell Agoto
- Ana Abad Santos
- Chaye Mogg
- Nour Hooshmand
- Jico Umali
- Aaron Maniego
- Renee Dominique
- Lottie Bie
- Zara Loayan

== Release ==
The film was released and premiered at the 19th Cinemalaya Independent Film Festival on August 4, 2023.

== Reception ==
Adie Pieraz of Wonder.ph praised the film and its humor and wrote: The humor of When This Is All Over is one we all know and can appreciate: conyo humor. Those phrases we’ve all made fun of (Sheesh!), the accent that is still—even in 2023—an accepted way to tell the Philippines, “Yes, I grew up different from you. We are not the same. I deserve to be treated better.”

Ryan Capili of Sinegang.ph gave the film 3½ stars out of 5 stars and wrote: When This Is All Over by Kevin Mayuga may occasionally be confused at times, but it still takes you on a visual feast experience that makes for a wild ride, showing how you can transform an intimate story of a son who just wants to reunite with his mother into a one big trip. Trainwrecktim of Letterboxd also gave the film 3½ stars and wrote: Some great moments here and there but doesn’t really hit the mark on any of the various points it wants to make. Martika Ramirez Escobar is a LEGEND for that cinematography though.

=== Accolades ===
Year	Awards	Category	Recipient	Result	Ref.
2024	4th Pinoy Review Awards	Best Cinematography	Martika Ramirez-Escobar	Won	
2024	4th Pinoy Review Awards	Best Editing	Maria Estela Paiso	Nominated	
2024	4th Pinoy Review Awards	Best Ensemble Performance	When This Is All Over	2nd Place	
2024	4th Pinoy Review Awards	Best Film Score	Jorge Weineke	2nd Place	
2024	4th Pinoy Review Awards	Best First Feature	Kevin Mayuga	Nominated	
2024	4th Pinoy Review Awards	Best Production Design	Kaye Banaag	Nominated	
2024	4th Pinoy Review Awards	Best Supporting Performance	Jorrybell Agoto	2nd Place	
2024	Udine Far East Film Festival	White Mulberry Award	Kevin Mayuga	Nominated	
2023	19th Cinemalaya Independent Film Festival	Best Cinematography	Martika Ramirez-Escobar	Won	
2023	19th Cinemalaya Independent Film Festival	Best Film	When This Is All Over	Nominated	
2023	19th Cinemalaya Independent Film Festival	Best Original Music Score	When This Is All Over	Won	
2023	19th Cinemalaya Independent Film Festival	Best Production Design	Kaye Banaag	Won	
