= List of Prima Donnas episodes =

Prima Donnas is a Philippine television drama series broadcast by GMA Network. Its first season aired on the network's Afternoon Prime line up and worldwide via GMA Pinoy TV from August 19, 2019 to February 19, 2021 replacing Bihag. Its second season aired from January 24 to April 30, 2022 replacing Las Hermanas.

NUTAM (Nationwide Urban Television Audience Measurement) People in Television Homes ratings are provided by AGB Nielsen Philippines.

== Series overview ==
Season	Episodes	Originally released	
Season	Episodes	First released	Last released
1	231	August 19, 2019	February 19, 2021
2	80	January 24, 2022	April 30, 2022

== Episodes ==
=== Season 1 (2019–2021) ===
No. overall	No. in season	Title	Social media hashtag	Original release date	Prod. code	AGB Nielsen Ratings (NUTAM People)	Timeslot rank
1	1	"Season 1 World Premiere"	#PrimaDonnas	August 19, 2019	1001 - A	4.9%	#2
2	2	"Pagsilang" (transl. Birth)	#PrimaDonnasPagsilang	August 20, 2019	1002 - B	5.2%	#2
3	3	"Mga Munting Prinsesa" (transl. The Little Princesses)	#PDMgaMuntingPrinsesa	August 21, 2019	1003 - C	5.9%	#2
4	4	"Sa Hirap at Ginhawa" (transl. Through Bad and Good Times)	#PDSaHirapAtGinhawa	August 22, 2019	1004 - D	5.3%	#2
5	5	"Ang Pagdadalaga" (transl. The Adolescence)	#PrimaDonnasAngPagdadalaga	August 23, 2019	1005 - E	5.9%	#2
6	6	"Pagdurusa" (transl. Suffering)	#PrimaDonnasPagdurusa	August 26, 2019	1007 - G	5.8%	#2
7	7	"Paghahanap" (transl. Finding)	#PrimaDonnasPaghahanap	August 27, 2019	1006 - F	6.0%	#2
8	8	"The Search"	#PrimaDonnasTheSearch	August 28, 2019	1008 - H	6.1%	#2
9	9	"Poser"	#PrimaDonnasPoser	August 29, 2019	1009 - I	5.9%	#2
10	10	"Escape"	#PrimaDonnasEscape	August 30, 2019	1010 - J	5.7%	#2
11	11	"Separated"	#PrimaDonnasSeparated	September 2, 2019	1011 - K	5.3%	#2
12	12	"Tagapagmana" (transl. Heir)	#PrimaDonnasTagapagmana	September 3, 2019	1012 - L	5.8%	#2
13	13	"Liar Liar"	#PrimaDonnasLiarLiar	September 4, 2019	1014 - N	6.0%	#2
14	14	"Triplets' Problems"	#PDTripletsProblems	September 5, 2019	1015 - O	6.3%	#2
15	15	"Bully"	#PrimaDonnasBully	September 6, 2019	1013 - M	6.5%	#2
16	16	"Wag Kang Susuko" (transl. Don't Give Up)	#PDWagKangSusuko	September 9, 2019	1016 - P	6.0%	#2
17	17	"Prima Donnas' Dream"	#PrimaDonnasDream	September 10, 2019	1018 - R	6.4%	#2
18	18	"Buhay si Lilian" (transl. Lilian is Alive)	#PDBuhaySiLilian	September 11, 2019	1019 - S	6.0%	#2
19	19	"Fake Friend"	#PrimaDonnasFakeFriend	September 12, 2019	1017 - Q	6.4%	#2
20	20	"Like Mother, Like Daughter"	#PDLikeMotherLikeDaughter	September 13, 2019	1020 - T	6.2%	#2
21	21	"Pa-Fall" (transl. Pretending to Fall)	#PrimaDonnasPaFall	September 16, 2019	1022 - V	6.7%	#2
22	22	"Prima Donnas' Birthday"	#PrimaDonnasBirthday	September 17, 2019	1021 - U	6.8%	#2
23	23	"Brianna's Fake Birthday"	#PDBriannasFakeBirthday	September 18, 2019	1023 - W	6.1%	#2
24	24	"Gatecrasher"	#PrimaDonnasGatecrasher	September 19, 2019	1024 - X	7.0%	#2
25	25	"Palaban" (transl. Aggressive)	#PrimaDonnasPalaban	September 20, 2019	1026 - Z	6.0%	#2
26	26	"Pa-Victim" (transl. Posey Victim)	#PrimaDonnasPaVictim	September 23, 2019	1025 - Y	6.1%	#2
27	27	"Pag-asa or Paasa" (transl. Hope or Illusion)	#PDPagAsaOrPaasa	September 24, 2019	1027 - 001 - AA	7.3%	#2
28	28	"Malaya Na" (transl. Freed)	#PrimaDonnasMalayaNa	September 25, 2019	1029 - 003 - CC	6.7%	#2
29	29	"No to Bullying"	#PDNoToBullying	September 26, 2019	1028 - 002 - BB	7.2%	#2
30	30	"Sumbungera" (transl. Complainant)	#PrimaDonnasSumbungera	September 27, 2019	1030 - 004 - DD	7.8%	#2
31	31	"The Proposal"	#PrimaDonnasTheProposal	September 30, 2019	1032 - 006 - FF	7.7%	#2
32	32	"Kendra's Nightmare"	#PDKendrasNightmare	October 1, 2019	1034 - 008 - HH	7.9%	#2
33	33	"Away Pamilya" (transl. Family Feud)	#PDAwayPamilya	October 2, 2019	1033 - 007 - GG	7.7%	#2
34	34	"Prima Donnas' Reunion"	#PrimaDonnasReunion	October 3, 2019	1031 - 005 - EE	6.6%	#2
35	35	"Puslit Paslit" (transl. Smuggled Child)	#PrimaDonnasPuslitPaslit	October 4, 2019	1036 - 010 - JJ	7.9%	#2
36	36	"Brianna Maldita" (transl. Rude Brianna)	#PDBriannaMaldita	October 7, 2019	1036 - 011 - KK	6.0%	#2
37	37	"Pabebe" (transl. Acting Like a Baby)	#PrimaDonnasPabebe	October 8, 2019	1035 - 009 - II	6.6%	#2
38	38	"Kendra & Lilian, Face to Face"	#PDKendraLilianFaceToFace	October 9, 2019	1040 - 014 - NN	7.5%	#2
39	39	"Daddy Jaime"	#PrimaDonnasDaddyJaime	October 10, 2019	1039 - 013 - MM	7.1%	#2
40	40	"Brianna Bruhilda"	#PDBriannaBruhilda	October 11, 2019	1038 - 012 - LL	7.9%	#2
41	41	"Walang Iwanan" (transl. No Parting)	#PrimaDonnasWalangIwanan	October 14, 2019	1043 - 017 - QQ	7.0%	#2
42	42	"Masamang Balak" (transl. Evil Plan)	#PDMasamangBalak	October 15, 2019	1041 - 015 - OO	8.0%	#2
43	43	"Bintang" (transl. Blame)	#PrimaDonnasBintang	October 16, 2019	1042 - 016 - PP	7.7%	#2
44	44	"Mga Prinsesang Palaboy" (transl. The Vagrant Princesses)	#PDMgaPrinsesangPalaboy	October 17, 2019	1046 - 020 - TT	7.3%	#2
45	45	"Nanay Lilian" (transl. Mother Lilian)	#PrimaDonnasNanayLilian	October 18, 2019	1044 - 018 - RR	7.8%	#2
46	46	"Pagkikita" (transl. Meeting)	#PrimaDonnasPagkikita	October 21, 2019	1047 - 021 - UU	8.3%	#1
47	47	"Panganib" (transl. Danger)	#PrimaDonnasPanganib	October 22, 2019	1045 - 019 - SS	8.2%	#1
48	48	"Face to Face"	#PrimaDonnasFaceToFace	October 23, 2019	1048 - 022 - VV	8.3%	#1
49	49	"Pekeng Heredera" (transl. Fake Heiress)	#PDPekengHeredera	October 24, 2019	1050 - 024 - XX	7.9%	#1
50	50	"Mother-Daughter Tag Team"	#PDMotherDaughterTagTeam	October 25, 2019	1049 - 023 - WW	7.8%	#2
51	51	"Pagdududa" (transl. Doubting)	#PrimaDonnasPagdududa	October 28, 2019	1051 - 025 - YY	6.2%	#2
52	52	"Pretty Little Liar"	#PrimaDonnasPrettyLittleLiar	October 29, 2019	1053 - 001 - AAA	7.1%	#2
53	53	"Face Off"	#PrimaDonnasFaceOff	October 30, 2019	1052 - 026 - ZZ	7.8%	#2
54	54	"Backstabber"	#PrimaDonnasBackstabber	October 31, 2019	1055 - 003 - CCC	7.1%	#2
55	55	"Digital Karma"	#PrimaDonnasDigitalKarma	November 1, 2019	1054 - 002 - BBB	7.4%	#2
56	56	"Necklace"	#PrimaDonnasNecklace	November 4, 2019	1056 - 004 - DDD	6.4%	#2
57	57	"Hanapin si Nanay Lilian" (transl. Find Mother Lilian)	#PDHanapinSiNanayLilian	November 5, 2019	1057 - 005 - EEE	7.2%	#1
58	58	"Rude Much?"	#PrimaDonnasRudeMuch	November 6, 2019	1059 - 007 - GGG	7.4%	#2
59	59	"Great Pretender"	#PrimaDonnasGreatPretender	November 7, 2019	1061 - 009 - III	7.8%	#1
60	60	"Jealous Much?"	#PrimaDonnasJealousMuch	November 8, 2019	1058 - 006 - FFF	7.6%	#1
61	61	"Sunog" (transl. Fire)	#PrimaDonnasSunog	November 11, 2019	1060 - 008 - HHH	6.6%	#2
62	62	"Sabwatan" (transl. Conspiracy)	#PrimaDonnasSabwatan	November 12, 2019	1062 - 010 - JJJ	6.6%	#2
63	63	"Best Actress"	#PrimaDonnasBestActress	November 13, 2019	1064 - 012 - LLL	6.4%	#2
64	64	"Pag-asa" (transl. Hope)	#PrimaDonnasPagAsa	November 14, 2019	1063 - 011 - KKK	7.0%	#2
65	65	"Much Awaited Reunion"	#PDMuchAwaitedReunion	November 15, 2019	1065 - 013 - MMM	7.7%	#1
66	66	"Moment of Truth"	#PDMomentOfTruth	November 18, 2019	1067 - 015 - OOO	7.6%	#1
67	67	"Paghaharap" (transl. Confrontation)	#PrimaDonnasPaghaharap	November 19, 2019	1066 - 014 - NNN	7.4%	#1
68	68	"Qiqil Much" (transl. Thrilled Much)	#PrimaDonnasQiqilMuch	November 20, 2019	1070 - 018 - RRR	7.7%	#1
69	69	"Fake Friend"	#PrimaDonnasFakeFriend	November 21, 2019	1068 - 016 - PPP	7.8%	#1
70	70	"Blackmail"	#PrimaDonnasBlackmail	November 22, 2019	1069 - 017 - QQQ	8.0%	#1
71	71	"Tulong" (transl. Help)	#PrimaDonnasTulong	November 25, 2019	1072 - 020 - TTT	7.1%	#2
72	72	"Stalker"	#PrimaDonnasStalker	November 26, 2019	1071 - 019 - SSS	7.1%	#2
73	73	"Stranger Danger"	#PrimaDonnasStrangerDanger	November 27, 2019	1074 - 022 - VVV	7.8%	#1
74	74	"Bahay ng Lagim" (transl. House of Gloom)	#PDBahayNgLagim	November 28, 2019	1073 - 021 - UUU	7.4%	#1
75	75	"Laban" (transl. Fight)	#PrimaDonnasLaban	November 29, 2019	1075 - 023 - WWW	7.5%	#1
76	76	"Wag Kang Susuko" (transl. Don't Give Up)	#PrimaDonnasWagKangSusuko	December 2, 2019	1077 - 025 - YYY	8.4%	#1
77	77	"Rescue"	#PrimaDonnasRescue	December 3, 2019	1076 - 024 - XXX	9.9%	#1
78	78	"Buhay o Kwintas" (transl. Life or Necklace)	#PrimaDonnasBuhayOKwintas	December 4, 2019	1078 - 026 - ZZZ	8.5%	#1
79	79	"Rebelasyon" (transl. Revelation)	#PrimaDonnasRebelasyon	December 5, 2019	1080 - 102 - b	7.6%	#1
80	80	"Kami ang Tunay na Prima Donnas" (transl. We're the Real Prima Donnas)	#KamiAngTunayNaPrimaDonnas	December 6, 2019	1079 - 101 - a	8.3%	#1
81	81	"Maniwala Ka, Jaime" (transl. Believe Her, Jaime)	#PrimaDonnasManiwalaKaJaime	December 9, 2019	1081 - 103 - c	8.0%	#1
82	82	"Sinungaling" (transl. Liar)	#PrimaDonnasSinungaling	December 10, 2019	1082 - 104 - d	8.0%	#1
83	83	"Ebidensya" (transl. Evidence)	#PrimaDonnasEbidensya	December 11, 2019	1083 - 105 - e	7.7%	#1
84	84	"Caroling"	#PrimaDonnasCaroling	December 12, 2019	1087 - 109 - i	7.3%	#1
85	85	"Takas" (transl. Escape)	#PrimaDonnasTakas	December 13, 2019	1085 - 107 - g	8.1%	#1
86	86	"Pagbabalik" (transl. Return)	#PrimaDonnasPagbabalik	December 16, 2019	1084 - 106 - f	7.8%	#1
87	87	"DNA"	#PrimaDonnasDNA	December 17, 2019	1086 - 108 - h	8.7%	#1
88	88	"Sampal kay Brianna" (transl. Slap for Brianna)	#PDSampalKayBrianna	December 18, 2019	1089 - 111 - k	8.9%	#1
89	89	"Huli ka, Brianna!" (transl. You're Caught, Brianna!)	#PDHuliKaBrianna	December 19, 2019	1088 - 110 - j	8.8%	#1
90	90	"Prima Donnas' Christmas Rumble"	#PrimaDonnasChristmasRumble	December 20, 2019	1090 - 112 - l	9.1%	#1
91	91	"May Pag-asa" (transl. There's Hope)	#PrimaDonnasMayPagAsa	December 23, 2019	1092 - 114 - n	8.0%	#1
92	92	"Tuloy ang DNA" (transl. DNA Pushes Through)	#PDTuloyAngDNA	December 24, 2019	1091 - 113 - m	7.2%	#1
93	93	"Paskong Prima Donnas" (transl. Christmas of the Prima Donnas)	#PaskongPrimaDonnas	December 25, 2019	1093 - 115 - o	6.9%	#1
94	94	"Kapit Lang" (transl. Hold On)	#PrimaDonnasKapitLang	December 26, 2019	1095 - 117 - q	8.3%	#1
95	95	"Dugo at Laman" (transl. Blood & Flesh)	#PDDugoAtLaman	December 27, 2019	1094 - 116 - p	8.4%	#1
96	96	"Plano ni Kendra" (transl. Kendra's Plan)	#PDPlanoNiKendra	December 30, 2019	1097 - 119 - s	7.5%	#1
97	97	"DNA Results"	#PrimaDonnasDNAResults	December 31, 2019	1096 - 118 - r	7.2%	#1
98	98	"Paano Na?" (transl. What Now?)	#PrimaDonnasPaanoNa	January 1, 2020	1099 - 121 - u	6.6%	#1
99	99	"Windang si Kendra" (transl. Kendra is Ripped)	#PDWindangSiKendra	January 2, 2020	1098 - 120 - t	9.4%	#1
100	100	"Back Fire"	#PrimaDonnasBackFire	January 3, 2020	1100 - 122 - v	9.5%	#1
101	101	"Unstoppable"	#PrimaDonnasUnstoppable	January 6, 2020	1101 - 123 - w	9.8%	#1
102	102	"Official Results"	#PDOfficialResults	January 7, 2020	1104 - 126 - z	9.4%	#1
103	103	"Unexpected Announcement"	#PDUnexpectedAnnouncement	January 8, 2020	1102 - 124 - x	10.1%	#1
104	104	"Twisted Fate"	#PrimaDonnasTwistedFate	January 9, 2020	1103 - 125 - y	9.0%	#1
105	105	"Sisters For Life"	#PDSistersForLife	January 10, 2020	1105 - 127 - aa	9.0%	#1
106	106	"Harsh Truth"	#PrimaDonnasHarshTruth	January 13, 2020	1107 - 129 - cc	9.8%	#1
107	107	"You Are Not Our Sister"	#PDYouAreNotOurSister	January 14, 2020	1106 - 128 - bb	9.3%	#1
108	108	"Don't Lose Hope"	#PDDontLoseHope	January 15, 2020	1119 - 141 - oo	8.4%	#1
109	109	"Unbreakable"	#PrimaDonnasUnbreakable	January 16, 2020	1109 - 131 - ee	8.7%	#1
110	110	"Galawang Kendra" (transl. Kendra's Moves)	#PDGalawangKendra	January 17, 2020	1108 - 130 - dd	8.1%	#1
111	111	"Shocking Discovery"	#PDShockingDiscovery	January 20, 2020	1110 - 132 - ff	8.3%	#1
112	112	"Lost and Found"	#PrimaDonnasLostAndFound	January 21, 2020	1111 - 133 - gg	8.0%	#1
113	113	"Hindi Kita Anak" (transl. You're Not My Child)	#PDHindiKitaAnak	January 22, 2020	1113 - 135 - ii	8.4%	#1
114	114	"Storytelling A Lie"	#PDStoryTellingALie	January 23, 2020	1112 - 134 - hh	8.8%	#1
115	115	"Laban Para Kay Mayi" (transl. Fight For Mayi)	#PDLabanParaKayMayi	January 24, 2020	1120 - 142 - pp	9.1%	#1
116	116	"Prima Donnas' Special Request"	#PrimaDonnasSpecialRequest	January 27, 2020	1115 - 137 - kk	8.2%	#1
117	117	"Buhay Prinsesa" (transl. Life of a Princess)	#PrimaDonnasBuhayPrinsesa	January 28, 2020	1114 - 136 - jj	8.9%	#1
118	118	"Out of Place"	#PrimaDonnasOutOfPlace	January 29, 2020	1116 - 138 - ll	8.4%	#1
119	119	"Rags To Riches"	#PDRagsToRiches	January 30, 2020	1117 - 139 - mm	8.8%	#1
120	120	"Sana All" (transl. Hoping All)	#PrimaDonnasSanaAll	January 31, 2020	1118 - 140 - nn	8.7%	#1
121	121	"Saturday"	#PrimaDonnasSaturday	February 1, 2020	1122 - 144 - rr	7.7%	#1
122	122	"Prima Donnas' Dream Come True"	#PrimaDonnasDreamComeTrue	February 3, 2020	1121 - 143 - qq	8.6%	#1
123	123	"Lilian Vs. Kendra"	#PDLilianVsKendra	February 4, 2020	1123 - 145 - ss	8.4%	#1
124	124	"The Kiss"	#PrimaDonnasTheKiss	February 5, 2020	1124 - 146 - tt	8.4%	#1
125	125	"Kutob ni Kendra" (transl. Kendra's Feeling)	#PDKutobNiKendra	February 6, 2020	1125 - 147 - uu	8.8%	#1
126	126	"Prima In Danger"	#PDPrimaInDanger	February 7, 2020	1128 - 150 - xx	8.7%	#2
127	127	"Laban, Lady Prima" (transl. Fight, Lady Prima!)	#PDLabanLadyPrima	February 8, 2020	1126 - 148 - vv	N/A	TBA
128	128	"Magbabayad Ang Maysala" (transl. The Offender Will Pay)	#PDMagbabayadAngMaysala	February 10, 2020	1127 - 149 - ww	8.9%	#1
129	129	"Pagbibintang" (transl. Blame)	#PrimaDonnasPagbibintang	February 11, 2020	1129 - 151 - yy	8.3%	#1
130	130	"Wrong Accusation"	#PDWrongAccusation	February 12, 2020	1130 - 152 - zz	8.6%	#1
131	131	"Inside Job"	#PrimaDonnasInsideJob	February 13, 2020	1131 - 153 - aaa	8.3%	#1
132	132	"Prima Donnas vs. Brianna"	#PrimaDonnasVSBrianna	February 14, 2020	1132 - 154 - bbb	8.5%	#1
133	133	"Lumayas Kayo!" (transl. Go Away!)	#PDLumayasKayo	February 15, 2020	1133 - 155 - ccc	7.7%	#1
134	134	"May Gusto Ka Ba Kay Lilian?" (transl. Do You Love Lilian?)	#PDMayGustoKaBaKayLilian	February 17, 2020	1134 - 156 - ddd	8.2%	#1
135	135	"Iwas Gulo" (transl. Avoid Trouble)	#PrimaDonnasIwasGulo	February 18, 2020	1135 - 157 - eee	8.7%	#1
136	136	"Umamin Ka Na" (transl. Admit It)	#PDUmaminKaNa	February 19, 2020	1136 - 158 - fff	8.4%	#1
137	137	"Kasalan No More" (transl. No More Wedding)	#PDKasalanNoMore	February 20, 2020	1137 - 159 - ggg	8.5%	#1
138	138	"Bawal na Pag-ibig" (transl. Forbidden Love)	#PDBawalNaPagIbig	February 21, 2020	1138 - 160 - hhh	8.6%	#1
139	139	"Lilian o Kendra?" (transl. Lilian or Kendra?)	#PDLilianOKendra	February 22, 2020	1139 - 161 - iii	7.7%	#1
140	140	"Tuliro" (transl. Puzzled)	#PrimaDonnasTuliro	February 24, 2020	1141 - 163 - kkk	8.8%	#1
141	141	"Sampal ng Katotohanan" (transl. Slap of Truth)	#PDSampalNgKatotohanan	February 25, 2020	1140 - 162 - jjj	10.2%	#1
142	142	"Kendra Traydora" (transl. Kendra the Traitor)	#PDKendraTraydora	February 26, 2020	1142 - 164 - lll	8.8%	#1
143	143	"Sabotage"	#PrimaDonnasSabotage	February 27, 2020	1144 - 166 - nnn	8.3%	#1
144	144	"Cedric To The Rescue"	#PDCedricToTheRescue	February 28, 2020	1143 - 165 - mmm	8.3%	#1
145	145	"Paninira ni Kendra" (transl. Kendra's Destruction)	#PDPaniniraNiKendra	February 29, 2020	1145 - 167 - ooo	8.4%	#1
146	146	"Mastermind"	#PrimaDonnasMastermind	March 2, 2020	1147 - 169 - qqq	7.4%	#1
147	147	"The Innocent Suspect"	#PDTheInnocentSuspect	March 3, 2020	1146 - 168 - ppp	7.5%	#1
148	148	"Rehas ang Pagitan" (transl. Break the Gap)	#PDRehasAngPagitan	March 4, 2020	1148 - 170 - rrr	8.1%	#1
149	149	"Naudlot Na Tulong" (transl. Delayed Help)	#PDNaudlotNaTulong	March 5, 2020	1150 - 172 - ttt	8.0%	#1
150	150	"Reyna ng Selda" (transl. Queen of the Prison Cell)	#PDReynaNgSelda	March 6, 2020	1149 - 171 - sss	8.2%	#1
151	151	"Unang Pagtatagpo" (transl. First Meeting)	#PDUnangPagtatagpo	March 7, 2020	1151 - 173 - uuu	8.2%	#1
152	152	"The Whistle Blower"	#PDTheWhistleBlower	March 9, 2020	1152 - 174 - vvv	8.1%	#1
153	153	"Wrong Decision"	#PDWrongDecision	March 10, 2020	1153 - 175 - www	8.3%	#1
154	154	"Patawad, Lilian" (transl. Sorry, Lilian)	#PDPatawadLilian	March 11, 2020	1155 - 177 - yyy	8.6%	#1
155	155	"Mag-ingat Kay Kendra" (transl. Beware of Kendra)	#PDMagIngatKayKendra	March 12, 2020	1154 - 176 - xxx	8.4%	#1
156	156	"Kendra Exposed"	#PDKendraExposed	March 13, 2020	1156 - 178 - zzz	9.9%	#1
157	157	"Totoong Mastermind" (transl. Real Mastermind)	#PDTotoongMastermind	March 14, 2020	1157 - 179 - aaaa	N/A	TBA
158	158	"Magtago Ka Na" (transl. You Better Hide)	#PDMagtagoKaNa	March 16, 2020	1159 - 181 - cccc	10.3%	#1
159	159	"Dream Come True"	#PDDreamComeTrue	March 17, 2020	1158 - 180 - bbbb	10.8%	#1
160	160	"Last Chance"	#PDLastChance	March 18, 2020	1160 - 182 - dddd	10.3%	#1
161	161	"Wanted: Lilian"	#PDWantedLilian	November 13, 2020	PD-1161	8.2%	#1
162	162	"The Wedding"	#PDTheWedding	November 16, 2020	PD-1163	9.3%	#1
163	163	"Goodbye, Lilian"	#PDGoodbyeLilian	November 17, 2020	PD-1162	N/A	TBA
164	164	"Ella vs. Brianna"	#PDEllaVsBrianna	November 18, 2020	PD-1164	8.9%	#1
165	165	"Laban, Lilian" (transl. Fight, Lilian)	#PDLabanLilian	November 19, 2020	PD-1165	10.9%	#1
166	166	"Evil Kendra"	#PDEvilKendra	November 20, 2020	PD-1168	9.3%	#1
167	167	"Gone Girls"	#PDGoneGirls	November 23, 2020	PD-1167	9.3%	#1
168	168	"Masked Criminal"	#PDMaskedCriminal	November 24, 2020	PD-1166	N/A	TBA
169	169	"Wag Kang Susuko" (transl. Don't Give Up)	#PDWagKangSusuko	November 25, 2020	PD-1169	9.7%	#1
170	170	"Killer Kendra"	#PDKillerKendra	November 26, 2020	PD-1173	9.9%	#1
171	171	"Pasabog" (transl. Explosion)	#PDPasabog	November 27, 2020	PD-1170	N/A	TBA
172	172	"Heartbreak"	#PDHeartbreak	November 30, 2020	PD-1171	N/A	TBA
173	173	"Second Life"	#PDSecondLife	December 1, 2020	PD-1172	9.6%	#1
174	174	"Fake News"	#PDFakeNews	December 2, 2020	PD-1174	10.6%	#1
175	175	"Saklolo" (transl. Help)	#PDSaklolo	December 3, 2020	PD-1175	N/A	TBA
176	176	"Jaime and Lilian"	#PDJaimeAndLilian	December 4, 2020	PD-1177	N/A	TBA
177	177	"Two Faced Brianna"	#PDTwoFacedBrianna	December 7, 2020	PD-1176	11.1%	#1
178	178	"Fake Letter"	#PDFakeLetter	December 8, 2020	PD-1180	10.2%	#1
179	179	"Remember Me, Lilian"	#PDRememberMeLilian	December 9, 2020	PD-1179	10.6%	#1
180	180	"The One That Got Away"	#PDTheOneThatGotAway	December 10, 2020	PD-1178	10.8%	#1
181	181	"Para Kay Mayi" (transl. For Mayi)	#PDParaKayMayi	December 11, 2020	PD-1181	10.3%	#1
182	182	"Wedding Bells"	#PDWeddingBells	December 14, 2020	PD-1182	N/A	TBA
183	183	"Ex ni Lilian" (transl. Lilian's Ex)	#PDExNiLilian	December 15, 2020	PD-1183	N/A	TBA
184	184	"Walang Makakapigil" (transl. Unstoppable)	#PDWalangMakakapigil	December 16, 2020	PD-1184	N/A	TBA
185	185	"Konsensya" (transl. Conscience)	#PDKonsensya	December 17, 2020	PD-1186	N/A	TBA
186	186	"Lagot Ka, Kendra!" (transl. You're In Trouble, Kendra!)	#PDLagotKaKendra	December 18, 2020	PD-1187	N/A	TBA
187	187	"Officially Mrs. Claveria"	#PDOfficiallyMrsClaveria	December 21, 2020	PD-1185	N/A	TBA
188	188	"Pag-amin ni Lilian" (transl. Lilian's Confession)	#PDPagAminNiLilian	December 22, 2020	PD-1190	N/A	TBA
189	189	"Real Parents"	#PDRealParents	December 23, 2020	PD-1188	N/A	TBA
190	190	"Nanay ni Mayi" (transl. Mayi's Mother)	#PDNanayNiMayi	December 24, 2020	PD-1189	N/A	TBA
191	191	"Ruben and Lilian"	#PDRubenAndLilian	December 25, 2020	PD-1191	7.3%	#1
192	192	"Maling Akala" (transl. Wrong Assumption)	#PDMalingAkala	December 28, 2020	PD-1193	N/A	TBA
193	193	"Blood Donor"	#PDBloodDonor	December 29, 2020	PD-1192	N/A	TBA
194	194	"Magkadugo" (transl. Siblings)	#PDMagkadugo	December 30, 2020	PD-1194	N/A	TBA
195	195	"Walang Takas" (transl. No Escape)	#PDWalangTakas	December 31, 2020	PD-1197	N/A	TBA
196	196	"Fake DNA"	#PDFakeDNA	January 1, 2021	PD-1195	N/A	TBA
197	197	"Confirmed"	#PDConfirmed	January 4, 2021	PD-1196	10.1%	#1
198	198	"Throwback"	#PDThrowback	January 5, 2021	PD-1200	11.1%	#1
199	199	"Hanapin si Mayi" (transl. Find Mayi)	#PDHanapinSiMayi	January 6, 2021	PD-1199	N/A	TBA
200	200	"Mayi, I am Your Father"	#MayiIamYourFather	January 7, 2021	PD-1198	N/A	TBA
201	201	"Tunay Na Pamilya" (transl. Real Family)	#PDTunayNaPamilya	January 8, 2021	PD-1201	10.7%	#1
202	202	"The Proposal"	#PDTheProposal	January 11, 2021	PD-1202	10.8%	#1
203	203	"Selos Much!" (transl. Jealous Much!)	#PDSelosMuch	January 12, 2021	PD-1203	11.7%	#1
204	204	"Sisters Forever"	#PDSistersForever	January 13, 2021	PD-1204	10.6%	#1
205	205	"Pride ni Ella" (transl. Ella's Pride)	#PDPrideNiElla	January 14, 2021	PD-1205	10.9%	#1
206	206	"Shookt si Kendra" (transl. Kendra is Shookt)	#PDShooktSiKendra	January 15, 2021	PD-1206	10.6%	#1
207	207	"Stronger Lilian"	#PDStrongerLilian	January 18, 2021	PD-1207	11.4%	#1
208	208	"She is Back"	#PDSheIsBack	January 19, 2021	PD-1208	10.0%	#1
209	209	"Lilian and Kendra's Face Off"	#PDLilianKendraFaceOff	January 20, 2021	PD-1209	12.0%	#1
210	210	"Muling Pagkikita" (transl. Meeting Again)	#PDMulingPagkikita	January 21, 2021	PD-1210	10.5%	#1
211	211	"The Comeback"	#PDTheComeback	January 22, 2021	PD-1211	10.9%	#1
212	212	"Kapit, Ruben" (transl. Hold On, Ruben)	#PDKapitRuben	January 25, 2021	PD-1212	11.0%	#1
213	213	"Sugod" (transl. Attack)	#PDSugod	January 26, 2021	PD-1214	N/A	TBA
214	214	"Queen vs. Queen"	#PDQueenVsQueen	January 27, 2021	PD-1213	N/A	TBA
215	215	"Pagtatapat" (transl. Face Off)	#PDPagtatapat	January 28, 2021	PD-1215	N/A	TBA
216	216	"The Fake Daughter"	#PDTheFakeDaughter	January 29, 2021	PD-1216	N/A	TBA
217	217	"DNA Test Again"	#PDDNATestAgain	February 1, 2021	PD-1217	10.9%	#1
218	218	"Hindi Kita Anak" (transl. You're Not My Child)	#PDHindiKitaAnak	February 2, 2021	PD-1218	11.6%	#1
219	219	"Buking Ka Na" (transl. You're Busted)	#PDBukingKaNa	February 3, 2021	PD-1219	11.6%	#1
220	220	"Umamin Ka Na, Brianna!" (transl. Admit It, Brianna!)	#PDUmaminKaNaBrianna	February 4, 2021	PD-1230	13.4%	#1
221	221	"The Fake Daughter"	#PDTheFakeDaughter	February 5, 2021	PD-1221	12.8%	#1
222	222	"Secret is Out"	#PDSecretIsOut	February 8, 2021	PD-1222	N/A	TBA
223	223	"Takot ni Brianna" (transl. Brianna's Fear)	#PDTakotNiBrianna	February 9, 2021	PD-1223	13.7%	#1
224	224	"Huli Cam" (transl. Caught on Cam)	#PDHuliCam	February 10, 2021	PD-1225	N/A	TBA
225	225	"Tunay na Kulay" (transl. True Colors)	#PDTunayNaKulay	February 11, 2021	PD-1224	14.2%	#1
226	226	"Lumayas Ka, Kendra!" (transl. Leave, Kendra!)	#PDLumayasKaKendra	February 12, 2021	PD-1226	N/A	TBA
227	227	"Mag-isa Ka Na, Brianna" (transl. You're Alone Now, Brianna)	#PDMagisaKaNaBrianna	February 15, 2021	PD-1229	N/A	TBA
228	228	"The Real Heiress"	#PDTheRealHeiress	February 16, 2021	PD-1228	N/A	TBA
229	229	"Jaime, Lilian & Ruben"	#PDJaimeLilianRuben	February 17, 2021	PD-1231	13.6%	#1
230	230	"Ang Huling Pasabog" (transl. The Final Explosion)	#PDAngHulingPasabog	February 18, 2021	PD-1220	N/A	TBA
231	231	"The Grand Finale"	#PrimaDonnasTheGrandFinale	February 19, 2021	PD-1227	13.5%	#1

=== Season 2 (2022) ===
No. overall	No. in season	Title	Social media hashtag	Original release date	AGB Nielsen Ratings (NUTAM People)	Timeslot rank
232	1	"Season 2 World Premiere"	#PrimaDonnas2	January 24, 2022	6.4%	#1
233	2	"Kendra and Betty"	#PDKendraAndBetty	January 25, 2022	6.4%	#1
234	3	"Lady Prima vs. Kendra"	#PDLadyPrimaVsKendra	January 26, 2022	6.4%	#1
235	4	"Kendra on the Loose"	#PDKendraOnTheLoose	January 27, 2022	5.9%	#1
236	5	"Para Kay Lenlen" (transl. For Lenlen)	#PDParaKayLenlen	January 28, 2022	5.8%	#1
237	6	"Brianna's Plea"	#PDBriannasPlea	January 29, 2022	4.9%	#1
238	7	"Welcome Back, Donna Lyn"	#PDWelcomeBackDonnaLyn	January 31, 2022	6.0%	#1
239	8	"Trauma ni Donna Lyn" (transl. Donna Lyn's Trauma)	#PDTraumaNiDonnaLyn	February 1, 2022	5.5%	#1
240	9	"Kendra, Nakakawala" (transl. Kendra on the Loose)	#PDKendraNakakawala	February 2, 2022	5.8%	#1
241	10	"Accidental Encounter"	#PDAccidentalEncounter	February 3, 2022	6.0%	#1
242	11	"Panic Mode"	#PDPanicMode	February 4, 2022	6.0%	#1
243	12	"Tagapagligtas" (transl. Saviour)	#PDTagapagligtas	February 5, 2022	5.1%	#1
244	13	"Mother's Love"	#PDMothersLove	February 7, 2022	6.2%	#1
245	14	"Donnas Reunited"	#PDDonnasReunited	February 8, 2022	5.9%	#1
246	15	"Sumbat ni Kendra" (transl. Kendra's Blame)	#PDSumbatNiKendra	February 9, 2022	6.1%	#1
247	16	"Kendra and Brianna"	#PDKendraAndBrianna	February 10, 2022	5.3%	#1
248	17	"Laban, Lilian!" (transl. Fight, Lilian!)	#PDLabanLilian	February 11, 2022	6.4%	#1
249	18	"Huli Ka, Brianna!" (transl. Caught You, Brianna!)	#PDHuliKaBrianna	February 12, 2022	N/A	TBA
250	19	"Promise Ring ni Kendra" (transl. Kendra's Promise Ring)	#PDPromiseRingNiKendra	February 14, 2022	5.9%	#1
251	20	"Konsensya" (transl. Conscience)	#PDKonsensya	February 15, 2022	5.7%	#1
252	21	"Bethany vs. Kendra"	#PDBethanyVsKendra	February 16, 2022	5.5%	#1
253	22	"Change of Plans"	#PDChangeOfPlans	February 17, 2022	6.3%	#1
254	23	"Goodbye, Kendra"	#PDGoodbyeKendra	February 18, 2022	6.1%	#1
255	24	"Bagong Mukha ng Kasamaan" (transl. New Face of Evil)	#PDBagongMukhaNgKasamaan	February 19, 2022	5.0%	#1
256	25	"Moving On"	#PDMovingOn	February 21, 2022	5.7%	#1
257	26	"Bagong Bethany" (transl. New Bethany)	#PDBagongBethany	February 22, 2022	6.5%	#1
258	27	"Brianna's True Colors"	#PDBriannasTrueColors	February 23, 2022	5.9%	#1
259	28	"Kendra's Revenge"	#PDKendrasRevenge	February 24, 2022	5.8%	#1
260	29	"Suporta kay Bethany" (transl. Support for Bethany)	#PDSuportaKayBethany	February 25, 2022	5.3%	#1
261	30	"Trying Hard to be Good"	#PDTryingHardToBeGood	February 26, 2022	4.9%	#1
262	31	"Halata Ka, Bethany" (transl. You've Been Noticed, Bethany)	#PDHalataKaBethany	February 28, 2022	5.3%	#1
263	32	"Truth Revealed"	#PDTruthRevealed	March 1, 2022	5.6%	#1
264	33	"Akting Aktingan" (transl. Act)	#PDAktingAktingan	March 2, 2022	5.8%	#1
265	34	"Youth for Peace"	#PDYouthForPeace	March 3, 2022	6.0%	#1
266	35	"Bethany's Trap"	#PDBethanysTrap	March 4, 2022	6.2%	#1
267	36	"Tension"	#PDTension	March 5, 2022	N/A	TBA
268	37	"Fake Friend"	#PDFakeFriend	March 7, 2022	5.9%	#1
269	38	"Mayi's Choice"	#PDMayisChoice	March 8, 2022	5.6%	#1
270	39	"Give Fonsie a Chance"	#PDGiveFonsieAChance	March 9, 2022	5.7%	#1
271	40	"Make Up or Break Up?"	#PDMakeUpOrBreakUp	March 10, 2022	5.9%	#1
272	41	"Best Cheater Award"	#PDBestCheaterAward	March 11, 2022	5.3%	#1
273	42	"Demolition Job"	#PDDemolitionJob	March 12, 2022	4.9%	#1
274	43	"Food Fight"	#PDFoodFight	March 14, 2022	5.0%	#1
275	44	"Viral Video"	#PDViralVideo	March 15, 2022	4.7%	#1
276	45	"Traydor Ka, Bethany!" (transl. Bethany, You Traitor!)	#PDTraydorKaBethany	March 16, 2022	5.3%	#1
277	46	"Pananamantala ni Bethany" (transl. Bethany's Exploitation)	#PDPananamantalaNiBethany	March 17, 2022	5.1%	#1
278	47	"Sakripisyo ni Jaime" (transl. Jaime's Sacrifice)	#PDSakripisyoNiJaime	March 18, 2022	5.9%	#1
279	48	"Ruben and Bethany Team Up"	#PDRubenBethanyTeamUp	March 19, 2022	4.4%	#1
280	49	"Set Up"	#PDSetUp	March 21, 2022	4.7%	#1
281	50	"Double Victory"	#PDDoubleVictory	March 22, 2022	5.1%	#1
282	51	"Marupok Ka, Jaime" (transl. You're Weak, Jaime)	#PDMarupokKaJaime	March 23, 2022	5.3%	#1
283	52	"Asar Talo" (transl. Stubborn)	#PDAsarTalo	March 24, 2022	5.3%	#1
284	53	"Tamang Duda" (transl. Real Doubt)	#PDTamangDuda	March 25, 2022	5.0%	#1
285	54	"Girls' Night Out"	#PDGirlsNightOut	March 28, 2022	5.1%	#1
286	55	"Drinking Challenge"	#PDDrinkingChallenge	March 29, 2022	5.5%	#1
287	56	"Liwanag sa Dilim" (transl. Light in the Dark)	#PDLiwanagSaDilim	March 30, 2022	5.7%	#1
288	57	"Challenge Winner"	#PDChallengeWinner	March 31, 2022	4.8%	#1
289	58	"Catch Me If You Can"	#PDCatchMeIfYouCan	April 1, 2022	5.0%	#1
290	59	"Back at You, Bethany"	#PDBackAtYouBethany	April 2, 2022	4.8%	#1
291	60	"Wag Susuko, Mayi" (transl. Don't Give Up, Mayi)	#PDWagSusukoMayi	April 4, 2022	4.9%	#1
292	61	"Shookt to Go"	#PDShooktToGo	April 5, 2022	5.3%	#1
293	62	"Truth Hurts"	#PDTruthHurts	April 6, 2022	5.8%	#1
294	63	"Hiwalayan" (transl. Separation)	#PDHiwalayan	April 7, 2022	5.4%	#1
295	64	"Regrets"	#PDRegrets	April 8, 2022	5.5%	#1
296	65	"Mag-ingat sa Magnanakaw" (transl. Beware of Thieves)	#PDMagIngatSaMagnanakaw	April 9, 2022	5.2%	#1
297	66	"Fake Account"	#PDFakeAccount	April 11, 2022	5.3%	#1
298	67	"Hulihan" (transl. Catch)	#PDHulihan	April 12, 2022	5.8%	#1
299	68	"Ako ang Nagwagi" (transl. I won)	#PDAkoAngNagwagi	April 13, 2022	5.0%	#1
300	69	"Payback"	#PDPayback	April 18, 2022	5.1%	#1
301	70	"Digital Karma"	#PDDigitalKarma	April 19, 2022	5.3%	#1
302	71	"Triple Victory"	#PDTripleVictory	April 20, 2022	5.5%	#1
303	72	"Duda ni Lenlen" (transl. Lenlen's Doubt)	#PDDudaNiLenlen	April 21, 2022	5.4%	#1
304	73	"Sikreto ni Bethany" (transl. Bethany's Secret)	#PDSikretoNiBethany	April 22, 2022	5.5%	#1
305	74	"Secret Keeper"	#PDSecretKeeper	April 23, 2022	4.6%	#1
306	75	"Whistle Blower"	#PDWhistleBlower	April 25, 2022	5.3%	#1
307	76	"One Million Peso Secret"	#PDOneMillionPesoSecret	April 26, 2022	5.6%	#1
308	77	"Kendra Revealed"	#PDKendraRevealed	April 27, 2022	5.8%	#1
309	78	"Call for Help"	#PDCallForHelp	April 28, 2022	6.1%	#1
310	79	"Rebelasyong Pasabog" (transl. Surprising Revelation)	#PDRebelasyongPasabog	April 29, 2022	6.7%	#1
311	80	"Finale Fit for Royalty"	#PrimaDonnasFinale	April 30, 2022	6.5%	#1
