= Deception (disambiguation) =

Deception is the hiding or distorting of the truth.

Deception or The Deception may also refer to:

- Deception (criminal law), a legal term

== Places ==
- Deception Glacier, Antarctica
- Deception Island, Antarctica
- Deception Plateau, Antarctica
- Deception River, New Zealand
- Deception Pass, Washington, U.S., a strait

== Film ==
- The Deception (film), a 1909 film directed by D. W. Griffith
- Deception (1920 film) or Anna Boleyn, a film starring Emil Jennings and Henny Porten
- Deception (1932 film), an American Pre-Code sports drama
- Deception (1946 film), a film noir starring Bette Davis, Paul Henreid and Claude Rains
- Deception (1975 film) or End of the Game, a German thriller
- Deceptions, a 1990 drama starring Nicollette Sheridan and Harry Hamlin
- Deception (1992 film) or Ruby Cairo, starring Liam Neeson
- Deception (2000 film) or Reindeer Games, a film starring Ben Affleck
- Deception (2003 film), a film starring Debi Mazar
- Deception (2004 film), a film starring Dina Meyer
- Deception (2008 film), a film starring Hugh Jackman and Ewan McGregor
- Deception (2013 Australian/Canadian film) or Absolute Deception, a film starring Cuba Gooding Jr
- Deception (2013 Italian film) or The Best Offer, a film starring Geoffrey Rush, Jim Sturgess, Sylvia Hoeks and Donald Sutherland
- Deception (2021 film), a French film starring Denis Podalydès

== Television ==
=== Episodes ===
- "Deception", Apoy sa Langit episode 14 (2022)
- "Deception", A.T.O.M. season 2, episode 1 (2006)
- "Deception", Beautiful Justice episode 8 (2019)
- "Déception", Bibi et Geneviève season 3, episode 49 (1990)
- "Deception", Blondie (1957 TV series) episode 16 (1957)
- "Deception", Blue Heelers season 5, episode 17 (1998)
- "Deception", Bronk episode 12 (1975)
- "Deception", Casualty series 25, episode 35 (2011)
- "Deception", Dallas (1978 TV series) season 12, episode 8 (1989)
- "Deception", Dick Powell's Zane Grey Theatre season 4, episode 28 (1960)
- "Deception", Holby City series 6, episode 39 (2004)
- "Deception", Homicide: Life on the Street season 5, episode 19 (1997)
- "Deception", House season 2, episode 9 (2005)
- "Deception", Kambal, Karibal season 2, episode 33 (2018)
- "Deception", Law & Order: Special Victims Unit season 4, episode 2 (2002)
- "Deception", Legend of the Seeker season 1, episode 17 (2009)
- "Deception", Motive season 2, episode 4 (2014)
- "Deception", NCIS season 3, episode 13 (2006)
- "Déception", Pour être libre episode 31 (1997)
- "Deception", Rookie Blue season 4, episode 11 (2013)
- "Deception", Silverwing episode 8 (2003)
- "Déception", Sophie et Virginie season 1, episode 10 (1990)
- "Deception", Star Wars: The Clone Wars season 4, episode 12 (2012)
- "Deception", Stolen Life episode 29 (2023)
- "Deception", Teen Titans season 3, episode 1 (2004)
- "Deception", That One Word – Feyenoord episode 7 (2021)
- "Deception", The 20th Century Fox Hour season 1, episode 12 (1956)
- "Deception", The Better Woman season 1, episode 23 (2019)
- "Deception", The Ford Television Theatre season 6, episode 28 (1955)
- "Deception", The Missing Husband episode 68 (2023)
- "Deception", The New Adventures of Black Beauty episode 24 (1991)
- "Deception", The Oval season 4, episode 15 (2023)
- "Deception", Unica Hija episode 71 (2023)
- "Deception", Within These Walls series 3, episode 3 (1975)
- "The Deception", Mystic series 2, episode 2 (2021)
- "The Deception", Planet of the Apes episode 8 (1974)
- "The Deception", The Legend of Prince Valiant season 2, episode 4 (1992)
- "The Deception", V: The Series episode 4 (1984)

=== Series ===
- Deception (2013 American TV series), prime time soap opera
- Deception (2018 TV series), American crime procedural drama
- Deception (Irish TV series), prime time television drama airing on TV3
- Deception (Ugandan TV series), Ugandan drama

== Games ==
- Deception (video game series), a series of PlayStation games
  - Tecmo's Deception: Invitation to Darkness or simply Deception, the first game in the series
- Mortal Kombat: Deception, a 2004 game in the Mortal Kombat series
- Deception (board game), a 2015 detective game

== Books ==
=== Fiction ===
- The Deception, the alternative title of Helping with Enquiries, a 1979 novel by Celia Dale
- Deception, a 1980 novel by Margaret Pargeter
- Deceptions, a 1982 novel by Judith Michael
- The Deception, a 1983 novel by Catherine Coulter
- Deceptions, a 1984 novel by Francine Pascal, the fourteenth installment in the Sweet Valley High series
- Deceptions, a 1986 novel by Annette Broadrick
- Deception, a 1988 novel by Joan Aiken
- Deception (novel), a 1990 novel by Philip Roth
- Deception, a 1991 novel by David Bischoff, the second installment in The UFO Conspiracy trilogy
- Deceptions, a 1991 short story collection by Marcia Muller
- Deception, a 1993 novel by Amanda Quick
- Deception, a 1993 novel by Ruth Ryan Langan
- The Deception, a 1996 novel by Marion Chesney, the third installment in The Daughters of Mannerling series
- Deception, a 1996 novel by Sophie Weston
- The Deception, a 1996 novel by Joan Wolf
- The Deception, a 1997 novel by Barry Reed
- Deception, a 1998 novel by Donna Hill
- Deceptions, a 1998 Star Trek novel by Bobbi J.G. Weiss and David Cody Weiss, the fourteenth installment in the Starfleet Academy YA novel series
- The Deception (Animorphs), a 2000 novel by K.A. Applegate, the 46th installment in the Animorphs series
- Deceptions, a 2001 novel by Sharon Green, the second installment in The Blending Enthroned series
- Jedi Apprentice: Deceptions, a 2001 Star Wars novel by Jude Watson, the first of two "Special Edition" installments and the overall 19th installment in the Jedi Apprentice YA novel series
- Deception, the American alternative title of Sanctum, a 2002 novel by Denise Mina
- Deceptions, a 2002 novel by Susan Sizemore, the fourth installment in the Laws of the Blood series
- Deception, a 2003 novel by John Altman
- Deception, a 2003 novel by Claire Lorrimer
- Deception, a 2004 novel by June Considine
- Deception, a 2005 novel by Sara Volger and Jan Burchett, the fourth installment in the Lady Grace Mysteries series
- Deception, a 2009 novel by Selena Montgomery
- Deceptions, a 2010 novel by Rebecca Frayn
- Deception, a 2010 novel by Jonathan Kellerman
- Mass Effect: Deception, a 2012 novel by William C. Diet, the fourth novel set in the Mass Effect universe
- Deception, a 2012 novel by Carolyn Haines

=== Non-fiction ===
- Deception: The Invisible War Between the KGB & the CIA, a 1989 book by Edward Jay Epstein
- Deception: Pakistan, the United States, and the Global Nuclear Weapons Conspiracy, a 2007 book by Adrian Levy and Catherine Scott-Clark
- Deception: The Great Covid Cover-Up, a 2023 book by US senator Rand Paul

== Music ==
- Deception (album), a 1987 album by The Colourfield
- The Deception (album), a 2011 album by The Dogg
- "Deception", a song by Blackalicious from A2G
- "The Deception", a song by I Like Trains from Elegies to Lessons Learnt

== See also ==
- Deception in animals, deception by non-human animals
- Military deception, misleading the enemy during warfare
- Deceit (disambiguation)
- Deceived, a 1991 film starring Goldie Hawn
- Deceiver (disambiguation)
- Decepticon, a race of robots in the Transformers universe
- Deceptive Records, a UK record label
