= Decepticon (disambiguation) =

A Decepticon is a faction in Transformers.

Decepticon may also refer to:

== Transformers ==
- Decepticon Hideout, a Transformers book
- Decepticons at the Pole, a Transformers book
- Transformers Decepticons, a video game
- Transformers: Revenge of the Fallen: Decepticons, a video game

== Other ==
- Decepticons (gang), a 1980s street gang based in Brooklyn, New York, United States
- Pheidole decepticon, a species of ant

== See also ==
- Deception (disambiguation)
- Deceptacon (disambiguation)
- Deceptikonz, a New Zealand hip hop group
