= Boesky =

Boesky is a surname. Notable people with the surname include:

- Amy Boesky (fl. 1991), American author and professor
- Ivan Boesky (1937–2024), American stock trader
- Marianne Boesky (fl. 1996), founder of the Marianne Boesky Gallery in New York City
