= Beautiful Justice =

Philippine television drama series

- Title card
- Genre: Action drama; Crime
- Created by: Loi Argel Nova
- Written by: Des Garbes-Severino; Lobert Villela; Glaiza Ramirez
- Directed by: Mark A. Reyes V
- Creative director: Aloy Adlawan
- Starring: Yasmien Kurdi; Gabbi Garcia; Bea Binene
- Country of origin: Philippines
- Original language: Tagalog
- No. of episodes: 100 (list of episodes)

Production
- Executive producer: Mona Coles-Mayuga
- Camera setup: Multiple-camera setup
- Running time: 23–43 minutes
- Production company: GMA Entertainment Group

Original release
- Network: GMA Network
- Release: September 9, 2019 – January 24, 2020

Beautiful Justice is a Philippine television drama action crime series broadcast by GMA Network. Directed by Mark A. Reyes V, it stars Yasmien Kurdi, Gabbi Garcia and Bea Binene. It premiered on September 9, 2019, on the network's Telebabad line up. The series concluded on January 24, 2020, with a total of 100 episodes.

The series is streaming online on YouTube.

== Premise ==
The lives of Alice, Brie and Kitkat will change when their loved ones who are Philippine Drug Enforcement Agency agents get involved in a bloody operation, leading them three to get close to each other and look for justice.

== Cast and characters ==
Cast

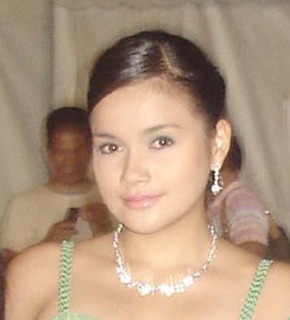
Yasmien Kurdi

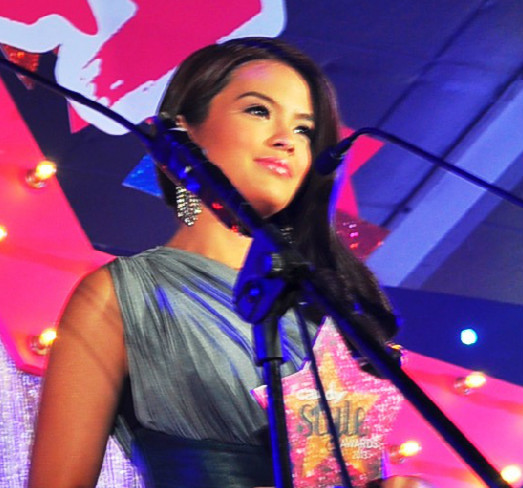
Bea Binene

Lead cast

- Yasmien Kurdi as Alicia "Alice" Santos-Vida
- Gabbi Garcia as Sabrina "Brie" Cuevas-Ocampo
- Bea Binene as Katrina "Kitkat" Bernardo

Supporting cast

- Gil Cuerva as Vincent "Vin" Ocampo
- Derrick Monasterio as Lance Decena / Brutus
- Victor Neri as Antonio "Tony" Bautista
- Valeen Montenegro as Miranda "Lady M" Samonte / Red Lotus
- Bing Loyzaga as Charmaine “Ninang” Tan / Chantal Cuevas
- Ian de Leon as Roman Bernardo
- Lilet as Marilen Bernardo
- Shyr Valdez as Ellen Vida
- Therese Malvar as Hershey Bernardo
- Phillip Lazaro as Queena

Guest cast

- Carlos Agassi as Adam Balagtas
- Vincent Magbanua as Dennis Bernardo
- Gabby Eigenmann as Ronnie Vida
- Kiel Rodriguez as Scott Reyes
- Kevin Santos as Kyle
- Mirriam Manalo as Bebeth
- Juan Rodrigo as Pocholo Cuevas
- Richard Reynoso as Aldrin Ocampo
- Clara del Rosario as a receptionist
- Miguel Faustman as an auctioneer
- Lovi Poe as herself
- Dang Cruz as Lolly
- Gino Ilustre as Aurelio Vida
- Michael Roy Jornales as Dudut
- Franchesco Maafi as Ronron Vida
- Ping Medina as Jiggs
- Dexter Doria as Lorna Chua
- Nikki Co as Gino Chua
- Kleif Almeda as Ana Chua
- Jojit Lorenzo as Enzo
- Angela Alarcon as Chloe
- Zara Lopez as Greta
- Brent Valdez as a PDEA agent
- Erin Ocampo as Aleli
- Robbie Packing as Jack Chua
- Jeremy Marquez as Rex Chua / Lazarus
- Kim Last as Denver Jacinto
- Elle Ramirez as Suarez
- Angeli Bayani as Analyn Esteban
- Mia Pangyarihan as Lovely
- Gelli de Belen as Patty
- Angelika Dela Cruz as Katrina Vijandre
- Will Devaughn as Smokey
- Carlo Gonzales as Lander Mercader
- Francis Mata as Richard Buenaseda
- Eliza Sarmiento as an attorney
- Shanicka Arganda as Ann-Ann
- Jeff Carpio as Calvin
- Allen Cecilio as a PDEA agent
- Jay Garcia as Denver
- Noa Hyun as a PDEA agent
- Rosemarie Sarita as a chairman
- Jackie Rice as Apple
- Bryan Benedict as a drug seller
- Denise Barbacena as Shine
- Glaiza de Castro as Roxy
- Diana Zubiri as Athena "Queen A" Vergara
- Louise Bolton as Mia Bermudez
- Bobby Andrews as Daryl Oliva
- Mega Unciano as Happy
- Alice Dixson as Black Rose
- Sanya Lopez as Thea Vasquez
- Diva Montelaba as Melanie
- Michael Flores as Osmond
- Cherie Gil as Diorella Peñareyes
- Chanel Morales as Dani
- Rey Soldevilla, Jr.
- Vince Vandorpe

== Production ==
Principal photography commenced on July 25, 2019.

== Ratings ==
According to AGB Nielsen Philippines' Nationwide Urban Television Audience Measurement People in television homes, the pilot episode of Beautiful Justice earned a 10% rating.

== Accolades ==
Accolades received by Beautiful Justice
Year	Award	Category	Recipient	Result	Ref.
2021	34th PMPC Star Awards for Television	Best New Female TV Personality	Angela Alarcon	Nominated	
