= List of Sweet Valley High books =

This is a list of books in the Sweet Valley High series, created by Francine Pascal. There are 181 books in total.

== Books ==
#	Title	Author	Publisher	Publishing date
1	Double Love	Francine Pascal	Random House	1983 (reissued: 2008/2011)
In the first book of the series, Elizabeth Wakefield develops a relationship with Todd Wilkins, but her twin sister Jessica also becomes interested in him and begins competing for his attention. Jessica’s interference creates tension between the sisters and complicates Elizabeth and Todd’s growing relationship. At the same time, rumours circulate at Sweet Valley High about Marianna West, a lawyer working at Mr. Wakefield’s law firm, leading to gossip and speculation among the students. As the misunderstandings are cleared up, Elizabeth and Todd’s relationship is tested, and the rivalry between the twins is established as a central conflict of the series.
2	Secrets	Francine Pascal	Random House	1983 (reissued: 2008/2011)
Elizabeth’s best friend Enid has a secret that she fears will end her relationship with her boyfriend, Ronnie. When Jessica spreads a rumour about Enid, Ronnie breaks up with her. Elizabeth attempts to repair the damage, and the situation shifts when Todd learns one of Jessica’s own secrets from Cara. Meanwhile, Lila Fowler, jealous of her father George’s relationship with French teacher Nora Dalton, starts a rumour about Nora. At the school dance, Enid tells Elizabeth that she has realised Ronnie was not right for her and that the incident helped her see him more clearly. Enid also reconciles her friendship with George. By the end of the book, both Jessica and Lila face consequences for their actions.
3	Playing With Fire	Kate William	Random House	1983 (reissued: 2008/2011)
At long last, Jessica is finally dating Bruce Patman! Unfortunately, she is changing her whole personality to fit in with what Bruce wants. Liz worries about this and also that Bruce is too fast. However when Jessica discovers Bruce cheating on her with another girl, she gets her revenge on him by throwing pizza on both his and his date's clothes. Meanwhile, could Sweet Valley High's own rock band, The Droids, be headed for the big time?
4	Power Play	Francine Pascal	Random House	1983 (reissued: 2008)
Chubby Robin Wilson wants to join SVH sorority Pi Beta Alpha and Liz nominates her, but furious Jessica and her conniving friends do everything they can to keep her out while Liz does her best to get her in. But when Robin gets blackballed, she realized the only person who cared about her as a friend was Liz. So she gets her revenge on the Pi Betas by not only losing weight, but also taking the Homecoming queen nomination from Jessica. Jessica is furious and attempts revenge on Robin. Jessica humiliates her by revealing the truth: that no one wanted her to join the Pi Betas because of her former obesity and the embarrassment they'd face from others. She demands that Robin give back the Homecoming queen title back to her, but this only turns everyone against her, having now seen how selfish and conniving she is. Also, wealthy Lila Fowler tries to get her absentee father's attention by shoplifting. When Liz finds out about Jessica being arrested for shoplifting and confronts Lila, she learns the truth about Lila's strained relationship with her parents, along with the fact that she considers Liz her true friend because she always put others before herself. When Liz asks about Jessica, Lila admits her dislike for the latter for how she mistreats others and how bad she felt for Robin when Jess blackballed her. Mr. Fowler shows up to clarify everything. Liz is given a good article on her good deeds by Mr. Fowler. The next day, Jessica endures humiliation after an article in The Oracle exposes her terrible deeds to Robin
5	All Night Long	Francine Pascal	Random House	1984 (reissued: 2008)
Jessica starts dating experienced college student Scott Daniels. After their late night she pleads with Liz to take a test for her, which infuriates her and gets her into a fight with Todd.
6	Dangerous Love	Francine Pascal	Random House	March 1st, 1984 (reissued: 2008)
Todd gets a motorcycle and Liz's parents forbid her to ride on it with him because of her cousin's motorcycle-related death. She disobeys-with disastrous consequences.
7	Dear Sister	Francine Pascal	Random House	1984
Liz wakes up from a coma following her accident and has turned into ... Jessica. She dumps Todd and starts flirting madly and indiscriminately with other guys. Jessica desperately wants her twin back.
8	Heartbreaker	Francine Pascal	Random House	1984
Jessica loves leading on Bill Chase, who once turned her down for a date, but is now falling for her, and Jessica's dazzle blinds him to DeeDee Gordon's genuine crush on him. Liz helps DeeDee out by exposing Jessica to Bill and leading him to dump her.
9	Racing Hearts	Francine Pascal	Random House	1984
Roger Barrett is a great runner, and when he wins a school competition, Lila Fowler shows interest. Jessica gets a job in her father's law firm.
10	Wrong Kind of Girl	Francine Pascal	Random House	1984
Annie Whitman wants to join the cheerleading squad, but Jessica doesn't want "easy" Annie anywhere near; her reputation might affect the squad. So when Annie nearly attempts suicide and Liz reprimands her, Jessica grudgingly agrees to let Annie join.
11	Too Good To Be True	Francine Pascal	Random House	1984
Suzanne Devlin, the daughter of one of Mr. Wakefield's college friends, has come to stay at the Wakefields' while Jessica goes to New York to stay with the Devlins. She manages to charm everybody, except English teacher Roger Collins and Elizabeth (who suspected her devious side). When she hits on Mr. Collins and he doesn't respond, she lets her truly diabolical side rule and accuses him of assault. Liz must expose her treachery and help save Mr. Collins' reputation. She succeeds with the help of Winston Egbert, who tricks Suzanne into making a video tape confession of her scheme. This humiliates Suzanne and she is sent home to New York to face proper punishment by her parents.
12	When Love Dies	Francine Pascal	Random House	October 1, 1984
Steven Wakefield discovers why his girlfriend Tricia Martin has seemed distant lately. Jessica tries again to get him interested in her friend Cara, but Elizabeth warns her to behave herself. The twins are candy-stripers at the local hospital.
13	Kidnapped!	Francine Pascal	Random House	October 1, 1984
A disturbed orderly named Carl kidnaps Liz from the hospital. Meanwhile, Max Dellon of Sweet Valley High's own band, The Droids, is arrested for the crime and everyone is pinning the blame on him. However, Jessica believes in his innocence and puts her scheming ways to good use by posing as Elizabeth. Her plan works well as she attends work as her sister. When Carl sees her as Liz, he is fooled into believing he had wrongly kidnapped Jessica. After he is caught by the police, Liz and Max show their gratitude towards her.
14	Deceptions	Francine Pascal	Random House	1984
Jessica has fallen for Nicholas Morrow, but he has eyes for Liz - who is already spoken for.
15	Promises	Francine Pascal	Random House	December 1, 1984
After Tricia Martin dies, her troubled, dropout sister Betsy stays with the Wakefields, to Jessica's dismay. Winston Egbert tries to break a pizza-eating record.
16	Rags to Riches	Francine Pascal	Random House	January 1, 1985
Roger Barrett is a Patman! It turns out Roger's father was Bruce's uncle Paul. When Roger's mother dies, Roger goes to live with the Patmans. His uncle Henry welcomes him, but Bruce and his mother snub him. Meanwhile, Jessica tries to get between Roger and his girlfriend Olivia. Ghostwritten by Amy Boesky.
17	Love Letters	Francine Pascal	Random House	February 1, 1985
Gossipy Caroline Pearce wants to be accepted, so she invents love letters to prove that she's got a boyfriend, and she actually stirs up others' interest in her relationship - too bad it's fake! Meanwhile, the twins think their parents want to move to San Francisco. Elizabeth then discovers that Caroline is lonely and has no friends at school, being continuously shunned. After befriending her, Liz encourages her to be herself. Caroline changes her ways for the better due to Elizabeth's friendship.
18	Head Over Heels	Francine Pascal	Random House	March 1, 1985
Bruce Patman and Regina Morrow fall in love. Regina, deaf since birth, learns of a treatment that may restore her hearing - but she'd have to stay in Switzerland for a year. She is finally happy with her Sweet Valley life, but what if she could actually hear?
19	Showdown	Francine Pascal	Random House	April 1, 1985
Frenemies Jessica and Lila clash over the mysterious Jack.
20	Crash Landing!	Francine Pascal	Random House	May 1, 1985
Enid and her boyfriend George are involved in a plane accident; Enid's injury - paralysis from the waist down - halts George from breaking up with her. Meanwhile, Jessica and Lila take a cooking course, mainly to drool over the scrumptious French chef. Ghostwritten by Amy Boesky.
21	Runaway	Francine Pascal	Random House	June 1, 1985
Jessica is fed up with coming second to her twin and decides to run away with Nicky Shephard to San Francisco. Meanwhile, Elizabeth's friend Ricky Capaldo is dealing with his parents' divorce: his mother won't let his father's parents spend time with him and his little sister.
22	Too Much In Love	Francine Pascal	Random House	August 1, 1985
Bill and DeeDee clash over her clinginess. Elizabeth plans a talent show and gets the shock of her life.
23	Say Goodbye	Francine Pascal	Random House	September 1, 1985
Todd Wilkins is moving to Vermont and Liz dreads their farewell. Jessica gets a job at a dating agency and tries to find matches for her brother Steven.
24	Memories	Francine Pascal	Random House	October 1, 1985
Steven Wakefield and Cara Walker take steps toward falling in love, but Tricia Martin's sister Betsy tries to sabotage it. Elizabeth sees Cara in a more favorable light and they become friends, which strains Cara's friendship with Jessica.
25	Nowhere to Run	Francine Pascal	Random House	December 1, 1985
Mr. Wakefield's parents visit, and Emily Mayer turns to the Wakefield family for help coping with her impossible stepmother, whose side her father seems to be taking over hers.
26	Hostage!	Francine Pascal	Random House	January 1, 1986
Regina and her parents are held hostage; Liz, Nicholas and Bruce try to rescue them.
27	Lovestruck	Francine Pascal	Random House	February 1, 1986
Ken Matthews is in love with stuck-up, snobby Suzanne Hanlon and will do anything to keep her happy, even change his whole personality.
28	Alone In the Crowd	Francine Pascal	Random House	April 1, 1986
Painfully-shy Lynne Henry is a talented songwriter. She could possibly win a competition to write a song for The Droids - if she could be encouraged to enter.
29	Bitter Rivals	Francine Pascal	Random House	June 1, 1986
Liz's old best friend Amy Sutton moves back to Sweet Valley from Connecticut. Liz is psyched, but Amy and Enid don't get along. Amy becomes close friends with Jessica when Liz makes one of her hardest decisions to remain friends with Enid.
30	Jealous Lies	Francine Pascal	Random House	August 1, 1986
Sandra Bacon and Jean West's friendship is strained when Jeannie wants to pledge Pi Beta Alpha, which Sandy thinks is the only thing she has that "perfect" Jeannie doesn't, causing her to try to keep Jeannie out. Meanwhile, Steven alarms his family by considering leaving college.
31	Taking Sides	Francine Pascal	Random House	September 01, 1986
Lila and Enid are after the same guy, newcomer Jeffrey French. Jessica and Elizabeth become pimps for their respective friends, and when Jessica realizes that Jeffrey only has eyes for Elizabeth, she does whatever she can to sabotage Liz's chances with Jeffrey. The twins' cousin Jenny picks this time to visit. Jenny catches on Jessica's plans and uses her conniving ways against her. After Liz and Jeffrey learn the truth, Ned and Alice gets involved and ground Jessica.
32	The New Jessica	Francine Pascal	Random House	November 01, 1986
After being mistaken for Liz too many times, Jessica aspires to a more sophisticated image, dyes her hair black, and pursues a modeling career (as "Jessa Fields"). Liz is hurt and scared that she'll lose her best friend. When the modeling agency hires Liz to be their new model, Jessica decides it's better to be herself and dyes her hair back to its natural blonde color.
33	Starting Over	Francine Pascal	Random House	December 01, 1986
Dana Larson's cousin Sally moves in with her family. The Wakefields might also have a new addition.
34	Forbidden Love	Francine Pascal	Random House	January 01, 1987
Maria Santelli and Michael Harris are in love, but their families are definitely against their relationship. To show their parents that they're serious, they become engaged.
35	Out of Control	Francine Pascal	Random House	February 1, 1987
Aaron Dallas has problems dealing with his parents' divorce, and his anger alienates him from everyone in his life. Meanwhile, Jessica attempts to make some fast cash by selling Tofu-Glo cosmetics.
36	Last Chance	Francine Pascal	Random House	April 1, 1987
Amy Sutton falls for Peter DeHaven, who looks pretty good to Julie Porter's dropout older sister Johanna - good enough that she might consider dropping back into school.
37	Rumors	Francine Pascal	Random House	May 1, 1987
Jealous Lila Fowler spreads a vindictive rumor about the mysterious Susan Stewart, who lives with a guardian and knows nothing of her biological parents.
38	Leaving Home	Francine Pascal	Random House	July 1, 1987
Elizabeth considers going to a prestigious writing school in Switzerland, and Jessica and Steven connive to keep her in California.
39	Secret Admirer	Francine Pascal	Random House	August 1, 1987
Penny Ayala, Liz's friend and editor of The Oracle, decides to put a personal ad in the paper. It is answered by a guy who finds her interesting, but was actually pressured to respond as a joke by nasty Kirk Anderson and other guys. Kirk's scheme angers Elizabeth enough to strike back with a plan that would have made Jessica proud.
40	On the Edge	Francine Pascal	Random House	September 1, 1987
Regina thinks she and Bruce are happy, but scheming Amy Sutton has other ideas. Regina learns of Amy's betrayal at a party at the Wakefields' and storms off after confronting Amy, Bruce, and Liz. Feeling rejected, she turns to a new crowd who are into hard drugs....
41	Outcast	Francine Pascal	Random House	October 1, 1987
Ever since Regina's death, people have been ostracizing Molly Hecht, blaming her for what happened. Even Liz finds not blaming Molly difficult. Eventually Liz and Molly's "only" friend Justin try to save Molly from making a terrible mistake.
42	Caught in the Middle	Francine Pascal	Random House	December 1, 1987
Sandra Bacon is in love with Manuel Lopez but her parents are narrow-minded racists. When Manuel is accused of being at the scene of an incident, Sandra is reluctant to provide him with an alibi as it will mean her parents will find out about her and Manuel.
43	Hard Choices	Francine Pascal	Random House	January 1, 1988
Enid's grandmother moves in with Enid and her mother.
44	Pretenses	Francine Pascal	Random House	March 1, 1988
Cara and Steven's relationship suffers through another unbelievable Jessica-engineered misunderstanding; Abbie Richardson, a former friend of Jessica's, becomes friends with Liz.
45	Family Secrets	Francine Pascal	Random House	April 1, 1988
Jess and Liz's cousin Kelly visits and deals with angst from her parents' divorce.
46	Decisions	Kate William	Random House	June 1, 1988
When Robin Wilson's aunt offers to pay for her to attend college in New York, Robin is torn between being able to afford college and wanting to stay near Sweet Valley with George and go to a school where she can pursue her swimming.
47	Troublemaker	Francine Pascal	Random House	July 1, 1988
Bruce Patman has become his nasty self again and starts tormenting Phi Epsilon pledge Josh Bowen, which infuriates his friend Julie Porter.
48	Slam Book Fever	Francine Pascal	Random House	August 1, 1988
Soon after the slam book is introduced to Sweet Valley, there's 137 different kinds of confusion as to who's dating whom. Liz is worried that boyfriend Jeffrey wants to go out with her friend Olivia Davidson. Jess is falling for the new boy but Liz's reckless behavior may ruin it.
49	Playing for Keeps	Francine Pascal	Random House	September 1, 1988
Jessica must enter a fashion show to compete with a nasty girl named Pamela Janson who threatens to steal boyfriend A.J. from her.
50	Out of Reach	Francine Pascal	Random House	October 1, 1988
Jade Wu wants to dance, but her strict traditionalist father disapproves.
51	Against the Odds	Francine Pascal	Random House	December 1, 1988
Ronnie Edwards has a gambling problem. Jessica tries her hand at selling homemade jewelry.
52	White Lies	Francine Pascal	Random House	January 1, 1989
John Pfeifer goes out with Jennifer Mitchell.
53	Second Chance	Francine Pascal	Random House	February 1, 1989
Tennis pro Kristin Thompson has a hard time dealing with her life choices.
54	Two-Boy Weekend	Francine Pascal	Random House	March 1, 1989
Since boyfriend A.J. is out of town for the weekend, Jessica sees no problem with going out with handsome Chris. But never underestimate karma - Jessica has trouble shaking Chris off after A.J. returns.
55	Perfect Shot	Francine Pascal	Random House	April 1, 1989
Shelley Novak is great at basketball, but dating ... not so much. Her longtime crush hardly notices her. Maybe school photographer can change her focus.
56	Lost at Sea	Francine Pascal	Random House	May 1, 1989
Jessica and Winston get stranded after a class trip.
57	Teacher Crush	Francine Pascal	Random House	July 1, 1989
Olivia Davidson develops a crush on her art teacher, Stuart Bachman.
58	Broken Hearted	Francine Pascal	Random House	August 1, 1989
Todd Wilkins returns from Vermont and throws Liz's life into a tailspin.
59	In Love Again	Francine Pascal	Random House	September 1, 1989
Todd leaves his snotty private school, which Jessica considers attending, and returns to SVH. He and Elizabeth rekindle their romance.
60	That Fatal Night	Francine Pascal	Random House	October 1, 1989
After being blinded in an accident, Ken Matthews gets dumped by shallow Amy Sutton, who just can't deal with a handicapped boyfriend. Ken eventually turns to football-team statistician Terri Adams.
61	Boy Trouble	Francine Pascal	Random House	December 1, 1989
Patty Gilbert is having a relationship problem with her boyfriend Jim. Will the two of them get back together?
62	Who's Who?	Francine Pascal	Random House	January 1, 1990
Deciding that the boys she's been dating are all the same, Jessica signs up with a dating agency and creates two drastically different identities. This attracts two different guys, but doesn't keep her from making dates with both of them for the same night....
63	The New Elizabeth	Francine Pascal	Random House	February 1, 1990
To shake off her stodgy image, Elizabeth decides to try surfing.
64	The Ghost of Tricia Martin	Francine Pascal	Random House	March 1, 1990
Steven meets a girl who is eerily like his late girlfriend Tricia, to the dismay of his current girlfriend Cara.
65	Trouble at Home	Francine Pascal	Random House	April 1, 1990
Alice and Ned Wakefield are having problems in their marriage. Elizabeth's attempts to help only make matters worse. Jessica starts using a teen chat telephone line.
66	Who's to Blame?	Francine Pascal	Random House	June 1, 1990
Mr. Wakefield is running for mayor of Sweet Valley, but has moved out of the family home. Elizabeth feels to blame for her parents' separation, and is so disillusioned with love that she even breaks up with Todd. Annoyed that Elizabeth is dating around, Jessica cruelly blames Liz for their parents' separation. Liz thinks the only solution is for her to leave home. Angered, Steven and Cara points out that it will be Jessica's fault if she continues her current behavior. She stays at Enid's for one night, and returns home to the reassurance that it was not her fault.
67	The Parent Plot	Francine Pascal	Random House	1990
While Liz schemes to reunite the Wakefield parents, Jessica thinks the best way forward is for them to start dating other people. She even sets Alice Wakefield up on a date with Mr. Collins. Liz discovers that there are corrupt businessmen involved in Ned Wakefield's mayoral campaign (some of whom were involved with Jessica). She reveals this to her father and he publicly pulls out of the campaign and reunites with the twins' mother. Meanwhile, Steven tells Alice about Jessica's schemes in breaking her and Ned up just to be known as the mayor's daughter. Infuriated, she and Ned confronts Jessica for her actions and she is grounded.
68	The Love Bet	Francine Pascal	Random House	August 1, 1990
Liz and Todd try to get Dana Larson and Aaron Dallas together, even when both of them "don't believe in love".
69	Friend Against Friend	Francine Pascal	Random House	September 1, 1990
Best friends Andy and Neil are really close. Then racist bully Charlie Cashman targets Andy because he's black. Attempting to cope with this, Andy starts pushing Neil away. Then one night Neil betrays Andy in a shocking way.
70	Ms. Quarterback	Francine Pascal	Random House	October 1, 1990
Claire Middleton becomes the star quarterback of the football team to the guys' dismay - which turns to admiration.
71	Starring Jessica!	Francine Pascal	Random House	December 1, 1990
Jessica and Lila become rivals again when vying to appear on Eric Parker's TV talk show. Lila's sometime rival Bruce aids her, having his own score to settle with Jessica. Can Elizabeth's own trickery hold back Lila and Bruce?
72	Rock Star's Girl	Francine Pascal	Random House	1991
Andrea Slade hides the fact that her father, Jamie Peters, is a rock star so people will like her for who she is...of course, Lila and Jessica will stop at nothing to find out her connection to Jamie. When Liz discovers this, she makes an attempt to defend Andrea's needs to protect her privacy even if it means being just as conniving in order to stop Jess and Lila from ruining her reputation.
73	Regina's Legacy	Francine Pascal	Random House	February 1, 1991
Mrs. Morrow gives Liz Regina's old camera as a keepsake. Liz takes an incriminating photo and finds her life on the line.
74	The Perfect Girl	Francine Pascal	Random House	March 1, 1991
Robin Wilson is so scared that her boyfriend George Warren will leave her for Vicky that she starves herself, thinking he won't leave her if she's slimmer.
75	Amy's True Love	Francine Pascal	Random House	April 1, 1991
Amy goes after top tennis player Tom McKay. He eventually comes out as gay, but she finds her true love in his friend, Barry Rork.
76	Miss Teen Sweet Valley	Francine Pascal	Random House	May 1, 1991
Feminist Liz and traditionalist Jess clash over Jess becoming Miss Teen Sweet Valley.
77	Cheating to Win	Francine Pascal	Random House	June 1, 1991
When Tony Esteban starts taking steroids, his girlfriend Annie Whitman tries to get him off them.
78	The Dating Game	Francine Pascal	Random House	August 1, 1991
Jessica starts dropping guys— then she sends a break-up text to Todd by mistake.
79	The Long-Lost Brother	Francine Pascal	Random House	September 1, 1991
Elizabeth's friend Sara Eastbourne's brother comes home after being in Connecticut.
80	The Girl They Both Loved	Francine Pascal	Random House	October 1, 1991
Artie Western and Michael Harris relentlessly compete over fellow motorbike enthusiast April Dawson. Jessica meets Sam Woodruff.
81	Rosa's Lie	Francine Pascal	Random House	December 1, 1991
Rose Jameson is hiding her Mexican heritage (and real name, Rosa) from everyone at school because she just moved to Sweet Valley; she wants a fresh start and thinks she can be anyone she wants to be.
82	Kidnapped by the Cult!	Francine Pascal	Random House	January 1, 1992
Grounded for her poor math grades, Jessica feels that nobody cares about her plight. She gets taken in by a group of people called The Good Friends, but by the time she realizes what they really are, it might be too late....
83	Steven's Bride	Francine Pascal	Random House	February 1, 1992
Cara Walker is moving to London, and a devastated Steven proposes so they can stay together. Elizabeth and Cara have become close friends— will they be sisters now?
84	The Stolen Diary	Francine Pascal	Random House	March 1, 1992
During a temporary breakup with Todd, Elizabeth dates a new guy, Kris, but when she rejects him, he gets his hands on her journal and spreads a lot of rumors about her. Can an infuriated twin restore Liz's good reputation?
85	Soap Star	Francine Pascal	Random House	April 1, 1992
Jessica and a very reluctant Elizabeth get parts on a soap whose star cruelly attempts to break Jessica's heart, but she uses her character's role to break up with him and exact revenge at the same time.
86	Jessica Against Bruce	Francine Pascal	Random House	June 1, 1992
Deciding things are getting too dull around Sweet Valley, Bruce starts the secret, men-only "Club X." Infuriated by this chauvinistic declaration, Jessica decides to prove that girls are as tough as boys, if not tougher than! What follows is a series of dares and pranks throughout the school and town, a display that disrupts a visiting delegation of foreign teachers, for which Liz is a student guide.
87	My Best Friend's Boyfriend	Francine Pascal	Random House	August 1, 1992
When a guy phoning the teen hotline for which she is volunteering asks to meet her in person, Ginny Belasca is worried that her looks will disappoint him and so she asks her prettier friend Denise to meet him. She does - and develops feelings for him too. Meanwhile, Jess enlists Liz's help in investigating a sexual harassment claim.
88	Love Letters for Sale	Francine Pascal	Random House	September 1, 1992
Jessica and Elizabeth start a letter-writing business and Jessica reads a letter from Shelley Novak, who has fallen for Todd Wilkis and wants them to write him a letter to ask him out. Not realizing what she's doing, Elizabeth writes the letter—and it works! Will Todd and Elizabeth stay together, or will the two basketball stars fall in love?
89	Elizabeth Betrayed	Francine Pascal	Random House	October 1, 1992
Ron, Olivia's boyfriend, plagiarizes Elizabeth's writings, almost ruining Elizabeth's job at The Oracle and her friendship with Olivia.
90	Don't Go Home With John	Francine Pascal	Random House	December 1, 1992
Lila goes on a date with John Pfeifer. He attempts to rape her and then torments her when many of her classmates don't believe her. When another girl he almost raped steps forward and exposes John, everyone shuns him and his friends tell him he needs to get help.
91	In Love With a Prince	Francine Pascal	Random House	January 1, 1993
Dana, lead singer of the band The Droids, falls in love with Prince Arthur, the twins' friend.
92	She's Not What She Seems	Francine Pascal	Random House	February 1, 1993
Jessica befriends sophomore Paula Perrine, who briefly overtakes her with her own brand of stealthy conniving. However, Elizabeth gets the last laugh with her own conniving and manipulation that would make Jessica proud.
93	Stepsisters	Francine Pascal	Random House	March 1, 1993
Annie Whitman's mom is getting remarried and Annie is thrilled to be getting a new stepsister as well. When she discovers that Cheryl is black, she invites all the black and Asian kids from school although she doesn't know half of them, in a misguided but well-meaning attempt to prove her open-mindedness.
94	Are We In Love?	Francine Pascal	Random House	April 1, 1993
Cheryl and Steven are really good friends, but in a series of misunderstandings, they end up as a couple, which some people have a problem with as they're an interracial couple.
95	The Morning After	Francine Pascal	Random House	June 1, 1993
The aftermath of the tragic prom, including the death of Jessica's boyfriend Sam Woodruff.
96	The Arrest	Francine Pascal	Random House	July 1, 1993
Elizabeth is arrested for manslaughter in the drunk-driving crash that killed Sam. Jessica seeks revenge by stealing Todd from Elizabeth. However, guilt starts to set in when Jessica starts to be haunted by nightmares in what she did to spike Elizabeth's drink.
97	The Verdict	Francine Pascal	Random House	August 1, 1993
Elizabeth is acquitted of manslaughter. She figures out that Jessica spiked her punch with alcohol and did nothing to stop her from leaving the prom, and the twins are torn apart. And they're not the only ones.
98	The Wedding	Francine Pascal	Random House	September 1, 1993
Lila's divorced parents remarry. Liz and Todd fight about where they stand, as do Jess and Todd.
99	Beware the Baby-Sitter	Francine Pascal	Random House	October 1, 1993
Margo is ever closer to Sweet Valley, but must contend with Josh, who is determined to stop her.
100	The Evil Twin	Francine Pascal	Random House	November 1, 1993
Margo arrives in Sweet Valley and begins her plan to become Elizabeth. It culminates at Lila's New Year's Eve bash, when Margo plans to murder Elizabeth and assume her identity. Jessica intervenes just in time, and Margo dies instead of Liz when Josh pushes her to her death. The traumatic situation bonds Liz and Jess all over again as Liz also discovers how she got drunk the night of Jungle Prom.
101	The Boyfriend War	Francine Pascal	Random House	December 1, 1993
Lila tricks Jessica into being a counselor in Kiddie Club Paradise and Mick, the sexy windbreaker at the camp, has to choose between them.
102	Almost Married	Francine Pascal	Random House	January 1, 1994
Elizabeth and Bruce believe that Alice Wakefield and Hank Patman, who had once been engaged, are having an affair, and forge a truce to try to end the situation. Although, in her parents' absence, Elizabeth is trying out living with Todd, she starts to have romantic feelings for Bruce.
103	Operation Love Match	Francine Pascal	Random House	February 1, 1994
Liz, Jessica, and Bruce's plot to reunite Hank and Marie Patman hits many obstacles. First, Jessica accidentally sends a letter to Marie meant to be for her boyfriend and is arrested when she is caught pilfering the mailboxes for the letter.
104	Love and Death in London	Kate William	Random House	March 1, 1994
Liz and Jessica begin their scariest adventures as interns in London.
105	A Date With a Werewolf	Kate William	Random House	April 1, 1994
Liz falls for a dark, handsome English stranger named Luke, who has a dark secret.
106	Beware the Wolfman	Francine Pascal	Random House	May 1, 1994
The London story is wrapped up as Liz's friend Luke is discovered to be the werewolf and she is devastated by his death.
107	Jessica's Secret Love	Francine Pascal	Random House	June 1, 1994
Jessica falls in love with an older man: Jeremy, the fiance of her house guest Sue.
108	Left At the Altar	Francine Pascal	Random House	July 1, 1994
Sue and Jeremy's beachfront wedding is demolished by Hurricane Jessica; Elizabeth and Todd reveal what they did when they were apart.
109	Double Crossed	Francine Pascal	Random House	September 1, 1994
Jeremy cheats on his new fiancee Jessica with his OLD fiancee Sue!
110	Death Threat	Francine Pascal	Random House	October 1, 1994
Sue's life is on the line and the twins suspect who might be behind the scheme.
111	A Deadly Christmas	Francine Pascal	Random House	1994
Jeremy's scheme to steal Sue's fortune is exposed and he is arrested.
112	Jessica Quits the Squad	Francine Pascal	Random House	December 1, 1994
Jessica finds herself in a rivalry with Heather Mallone, who becomes the new co-captain. Jessica also becomes romantically involved with Ken Matthews. And could Elizabeth have a secret desire for him too?
113	The Pom-Pom Wars	Francine Pascal	Random House	January 1, 1995
Jessica forms her own cheerleading squad, which includes Elizabeth. Elizabeth betrays Jessica and Todd to discover the truth about her feelings for Ken. Todd discovers Elizabeth and Ken's secret romance.
114	"V" For Victory	Francine Pascal	Random House	February 1, 1995
The two squads vie for victory. Heather Mallone's past isn't perfect and her cool demeanor crumbles. When Todd, Ken, and Winston come to cheer on the Sweet Valley High girls' squad, they become cheerleaders themselves!
115	The Treasure of Death Valley	Francine Pascal	Random House	April 1, 1995
A handful of students are selected to go on a hike through Death Valley: Liz, Jess, Todd, Ken, Bruce, and Heather. While hiking, they stumble upon a treasure map that promises to lead them to great fortune, but following the map means leaving the planned trail, which could be dangerous. Meanwhile, a dangerous group stalks them through the desert...
116	Nightmare In Death Valley	Francine Pascal	Random House	May 1, 1995
The group finds the treasure but are soon attacked by the convicts. How will they escape? Will they get to keep the gold or be forced to leave it behind?
117	Jessica the Genius	Francine Pascal	Random House	August 1, 1995
Jessica is accused of cheating on the SATs, and Elizabeth sets out to prove her twin's innocence.
118	College Weekend	Francine Pascal	Random House	September 1, 1995
Jessica and Elizabeth visit Steven at Sweet Valley University.
119	Jessica's Older Guy	Francine Pascal	Random House	October 1, 1995
When Jessica and Elizabeth decide to stay at SVU, their friends plot to bring them home.
120	In Love With the Enemy	Francine Pascal	Random House	December 1, 1995
The rivalry between SVH and Palisades High becomes a bitter feud as Jessica falls for Palisades student Christian Gorman, betraying her boyfriend Ken Matthews in the process. A gang war starts and nobody can stop it. On the lighter side, Jessica and Lila bet on Jessica's chances of winning a surfing contest.
121	The High School War	Francine Pascal	Random House	January 1, 1996
Jessica and Christian aim to make their relationship work, in spite of the anger and animosity at both schools.
122	A Kiss Before Dying	Francine Pascal	Random House	February 1, 1996
The feud between Palisades and SVH reaches a deadly conclusion when Christian Gorman is accidentally killed. The surfing contest also happens.
123	Elizabeth's Rival	Francine Pascal	Random House	April 1, 1996
Elizabeth is reunited with middle-school bestie Maria Slater at a special summer camp for the arts, but they must endure Maria's current best friend's scheming antics. Meanwhile, Jessica meets someone who might be able to help her recover from Christian's tragic death.
124	Meet Me at Midnight	Francine Pascal	Random House	May 1, 1996
Elizabeth falls for a camp counselor, while Jessica frets over her fiery relationship with Paul.
125	Camp Killer	Francine Pascal	Random House	June 1, 1996
A scary camp legend proves true when a crazy mountain man near the camp kidnaps and tries to kill a camper and one of the twins.
126	Tall, Dark and Deadly	Francine Pascal	Random House	August 1, 1996
Newcomer Jonathan Cain is tall, dark, handsome, and mysterious...and sudden deaths occur at his entrance. SVH students follow him like adoring fans, and Jessica Wakefield feels a supernatural pull to him. The only student who adamantly distrusts and dislikes Jonathan is Elizabeth, who finds him disturbing. Jessica seems unable to entice Jonathan, despite how sure she is of their destiny. Elizabeth's past summer fling threatens her future with Todd. Maria Slater returns to Sweet Valley, joining Elizabeth at Sweet Valley High, and Enid is jealous.
127	Dance of Death	Francine Pascal	Random House	September 1, 1996
Jessica and Jonathan appear to be moving forward, or at least Jessica thinks so, as her classmates continue to be obsessed with Jonathan. Amy's cousin Katrina's visit to Sweet Valley ends horrifically. Enid brags about her exploits with Jonathan, much to Jessica's fury and Elizabeth's concern. The Sweet Valley High guys plan a wild party at Jonathan's house. Joey and Elizabeth begin moving forward, as Todd and Elizabeth disintegrate. The path of murders continues.
128	Kiss of a Killer	Francine Pascal	Random House	October 1, 1996
After Katrina's death at Jonathan Cain's house, Elizabeth investigates his past, becoming ever more shocked and terrified by her finds. Jonathan takes Jessica to his favorite hangout - which happens to be where the murderer took his victims. Jessica plans to depart with Jonathan as she falls into his trance. Jonathan puts Enid in a coma, but shows remorse and spares her life. The Sweet Valley High fans become less adoring and more suspicious and finally discover the truth. Joey and Elizabeth finds themselves incompatible. Todd and Elizabeth become romantically involved again. Elizabeth spares Jonathan and Jonathan departs, which lifts the curse he'd had over Sweet Valley.
129	Cover Girls	Francine Pascal	Random House	February 10, 1997
The twins get internships at a fashion magazine. Elizabeth aims to learn about journalism while Jessica aims to become a supermodel. When Todd's the one who gets discovered and becomes a model, Jessica sees green and red...which Elizabeth sees when she finds him in the arms of another woman.
130	Model Flirt	Francine Pascal	Random House	March 10, 1997
Elizabeth's new mentor at the fashion magazine steals her idea for a column and attempts to murder her to keep her secret. Jessica gets closer to achieving her goal.
131	Fashion Victim	Francine Pascal	Random House	April 7, 1997
Elizabeth and Jessica team up to get their revenge on those who have wronged them.
132	Once Upon a Time	Francine Pascal	Random House	May 12, 1997
Elizabeth and Jessica travel to France to be au pairs for a royal family. Elizabeth falls for Prince Laurent and Jessica falls for jewel thief Jacques.
133	To Catch a Thief	Francine Pascal	Random House	July 7, 1997
Elizabeth and Jessica are on the run after being falsely accused of stealing Antonia's diamond necklace and the Countess' emerald pendant. Meanwhile, Jacques feels guilty for his mistake and must atone for them.
134	Happily Ever After	Francine Pascal	Random House	August 11, 1997
The twins' names are cleared. Prince Laurent refuses to marry Antonia and proposes to Elizabeth. She refuses and returns to Sweet Valley where she reconciles with Todd. Jacques admits to the theft and is arrested. Prince Laurent helps Jacques and his father escape.
135	Lila's New Flame	Francine Pascal	Random House	October 6, 1997
Lila ends her relationship with Bo and her mansion catches fire. She awakens in the hospital with the twins by her side. No one is able to locate her parents, as they are taking a second honeymoon and are unreachable on their remote island. The investigation report finds the fire at Fowler Crest to be an act of arson due to the traces of gasoline all over the estate. The DA suspects Lila as the arsonist as a cry for attention. Steven Wakefield and longtime girlfriend Bille end their relationship and Steven begins his internship at the DA's office. As the DA's suspicion in Lila grows, so do Steven's romantic feelings for her. Devon Whitelaw has just lost both his parents and tries to find other relatives he can trust.
136	Too Hot To Handle	Francine Pascal	Random House	November 10, 1997
Devon Whitelaw heads to Las Vegas to find a long-lost uncle. Lila and Steven continue their romance while Steven looks for clues about who destroyed Fowler Crest.
137	Fight Fire With Fire	Francine Pascal	Random House	December 1, 1997
John's attempt to destroy Lila ends up destroying him. Jessica and Elizabeth must pay for their assumptions when Lila and Steven confront them. Devon finds an old nanny who reveals the truth of his parents' sordid past and neglect.
138	What Jessica Wants...	Francine Pascal	Random House	February 9, 1998
Devon Whitelaw is the new student at Sweet Valley High; Jessica wants him but he falls for Elizabeth.
139	Elizabeth is Mine	Francine Pascal	Random House	March 9, 1998
Elizabeth Wakefield never planned on straying from her longtime boyfriend, Todd Wilkins. But she'd never met anyone like Devon Whitelaw. He's devastatingly sexy, brilliant, and impossible for her to resist. When he rejects Jessica, she attempts to seduce Todd for revenge. Elizabeth tries to break up with Todd gently, but the more she pushes him away, the tighter he clings. Can Elizabeth make Todd understand that she no longer loves him without breaking his heart?
140	Please Forgive Me	Francine Pascal	Random House	April 6, 1998
Elizabeth Wakefield's heart is being ripped to shreds. The rivalry between her longtime boyfriend Todd Wilkins and the mysterious Devon Whitelaw has erupted into violence. Forget choosing between them - a disgusted Elizabeth ditches them both. Unless they can both grow up, she'll never speak to either one of them again! Horrified and feeling guilty that he flew off the handle, Todd understands why Elizabeth will have nothing to do with him. But he's not about to give up without a fight. When a dance that Elizabeth is organizing doesn't go as planned, Todd seizes the opportunity to prove how far he'll go to win her forgiveness. But will his desperate effort push him over the edge?
141	A Picture-Perfect Prom?	Francine Pascal	Random House	May 11, 1998
Elizabeth needs to make a decision fast. She told both of her ex-boyfriends, devoted Todd and sexy Devon, that she needed time to stand on her own. But now she's totally alone, without a prom date! Will she be able to figure out who her dream guy is...before he asks someone else? Meanwhile Jessica attempts to ask Devon out herself, but he refuses, having seen her for the selfish, conniving and manipulative person she is. Ghostwritten by J. E. Bright.
142	The Big Night	Francine Pascal	Random House	June 8, 1998
Elizabeth is walking on air. She can't wait to attend the prom on the arm of her sexy date, Devon Whitelaw. But when Todd wants to be alone with her one last time. Will Elizabeth be swept away by a flood of romantic memories?
143	Party Weekend	Francine Pascal	Random House	July 6, 1998
It's the weekend after the prom, and Sweet Valley High has entered a talent contest at the countrywide battle of the junior classes! Olivia Davidson is in charge of the SVH team and she's ready for some friendly, fun-filled competition. But when the rivalry escalates to a violent level, Olivia may be caught in the crossfire. In true school spirit, Jessica Wakefield is ready to do anything to make sure SVH's team is victorious...until things start to get out of control. Jessica is suddenly haunted by images of Christian Gorman, the love she lost forever in a tragic inter-school confrontation. Has Christian's spirit returned to remind Jessica of what's really important? Note: This is the first appearance of Tia Ramirez.

=== Super Editions ===
#	Title	Author	Publisher	Date
1	Perfect Summer	Francine Pascal	Random House	July 1, 1985
The first Super Edition in the series. Liz and Jessica go on a coastal bicycle trip with their friends and two teachers. Feuds run rampant on the trip until a forest fire, set deliberately by a fellow cyclist, brings them all together.
2	Special Christmas	Francine Pascal	Random House	November 1, 1985
Suzanne Devlin returns to Sweet Valley to a predictably chilly reception. Can she fulfill her important mission?
3	Spring Break	Francine Pascal	Random House	March 1, 1986
Jessica and Elizabeth enjoy their time in Cannes.
4	Malibu Summer	Francine Pascal	Random House	July 1, 1986
Elizabeth, Lila, and Jessica are au pairs in Malibu.
5	Winter Carnival	Francine Pascal	Random House	November 1, 1986
As a winter celebration nears, Liz fights resentment toward Jessica's flippant attitudes.
6	Spring Fever	Francine Pascal	Random House	March 1, 1987
Elizabeth and Jessica visit relatives in a charming Midwestern town and find much more excitement than they'd anticipated.
7	Falling for Lucas	Francine Pascal	Random House	January 1, 1996
Jessica's ski vacation goes from fun to fantastic when she takes lessons with ski instructor Lucas King. Unfortunately, Lila has fallen for him too. Jessica's determined to keep Lucas out of Lila's clutches, no matter what she must risk. Meanwhile, Elizabeth joins the rescue team seeking Todd in an avalanche.
8	Jessica Takes Manhattan	Francine Pascal	Random House	January 1, 1997
Jessica and Lila jet off to New York City.
9	Mystery Date	Francine Pascal	Random House	January 12, 1998
Olivia falls in love with a guy in an internet chat room. Sweet Valley High is torn apart by tension between the various cliques (the jocks, the brains, the nerds etc.).
10	Last Wish	Francine Pascal	Random House	August 10, 1998
Jessica and Elizabeth Wakefield are turning 17 at the biggest party in Sweet Valley High history! But when tragedy strikes, the Sweet Valley High you know and love will never be the same, and one of your favorite characters may be lost forever.
11	Earthquake	Francine Pascal	Random House	October 13, 1998
An earthquake rocks Sweet Valley, and the Wakefields move in with the Fowlers, solidifying a friendship between the two families.
12	Aftershock	Francine Pascal	Random House	November 10, 1998
The victims' lives are celebrated. Jessica's friendship with Lila and Amy suffers as well as her own relationship with Elizabeth. However, Annie and Jade stand by Jessica. Elizabeth's friendship with Enid also suffers. Ghostwritten by J. E. Bright.

=== Super Thrillers ===
#	Title	Author	Publisher	Date
1	Double Jeopardy	Francine Pascal	Random House	December, 1987
The twins' lives are in jeopardy when Jessica is the only witness to a murder and the murderer thinks Elizabeth is Jessica.
2	On the Run	Francine Pascal	Random House	May 1, 1988
Elizabeth falls for a boy named Eric, who is hiding his true identity as a member of the Witness Protection Program.
3	No Place to Hide	Francine Pascal	Random House	November 1, 1988
Nicholas Morrow has fallen for the beautiful, mysterious Barbara. She warns him to stay away, but he doesn't. Meanwhile, the twins find a shocking secret about one of the men running for mayor, who has a connection to Barbara. Can the twins and Nicholas find out his plan and save Barbara before it's too late?
4	Deadly Summer	Francine Pascal	Random House	June 1, 1989
The twins get summer internships at the local paper. An insane bomber mistakenly believes Elizabeth is the girl who humiliated him many years ago. Meanwhile, Eliza tries to keep her secret about her brother but she might have to reveal the truth to save Liz.
5	Murder on the Line	Francine Pascal	Random House	December 1, 1992
6	Murder In Paradise	Francine Pascal	Random House	March 1, 1995
Alice Wakefield wins a trip to a luxurious spa run by a former college classmate who desires her face.
7	A Stranger In the House	Francine Pascal	Random House	June 1, 1995
8	A Killer on Board	Francine Pascal	Random House	July 1, 1995
9	"R" for Revenge	Francine Pascal	Random House	September 8, 1997
Elizabeth must eventually save Jessica and the cheerleading squad when they are kidnapped by their new advisor.

=== Super Stars ===
#	Title	Author	Publisher	Date
1	Lila's Story	Francine Pascal	Random House	January 1st, 1989
Lila tries to stop her father's wedding to a gold-digger who has an equally scheming daughter.
2	Bruce's Story	Francine Pascal	Random House	May 1, 1990
Bruce and Roger are put into a competition, but their bond allows them to help each other.
3	Enid's Story	Francine Pascal	Random House	November 1, 1990
Enid deals with her parents' stormy relationship again, and almost falls back into the drug scene.
4	Olivia's Story	Francine Pascal	Random House	November 1, 1991
Olivia's cousin arrives and almost turns Olivia's world upside down.
5	Todd's Story	Francine Pascal	Random House	January 1, 1992
Todd lands a job as a counselor at a summer camp in Secca Lake along with his girlfriend and many of his friends. He's shocked to find Kevin Holmes is working there too. Kevin will do anything to get back at Todd. Everyone believes Kevin is amazing. Will they discover the truth, or will Todd be doomed forever?

=== Magna Editions ===
#	Title	Author	Publisher	Date
1	The Wakefields of Sweet Valley	Francine Pascal	Random House	January 1, 1991
The story of the twins' relatives.
2	The Wakefield Legacy: The Untold Story	Francine Pascal	Random House	May 1, 1992
The twins' father's relatives' stories are told.
3	A Night to Remember	Francine Pascal	Random House	January 5, 1993
Jessica and Elizabeth have an idea for a jungle-themed prom. Both want to be crowned Queen, and become so angry that they rarely speak in the days leading up to prom. Fearing that Elizabeth will win, Jessica sweet-talks some party-crashers into giving her some of the alcohol they'd brought. She spikes Elizabeth's punch, gets crowned Queen, then watches Elizabeth leave with Sam - Jessica's own boyfriend. She's unable to stop them and there is a deadly crash. Realizing what she has done, Jessica feels remorse for the first time.
4	Elizabeth's Secret Diary	Francine Pascal	Random House	January 1, 1994
Elizabeth's adventure after Todd Wilkins moved away. Reviews events from Sweet Valley High books 20-30.
5	Jessica's Secret Diary	Francine Pascal	Random House	August 1, 1994
Events from Sweet Valley High books 30-40 are seen from Jessica's viewpoint.
6	Return of the Evil Twin	Francine Pascal	Random House	January 1, 1995
Margo's twin sister Nora seeks revenge on Jessica and Elizabeth for her twin's death. She discovers that her sister was alive, in hiding, the whole time. Nora then discovers how evil Margo truly is and had planned to murder her. Elizabeth discovers that Margo is alive and had kidnapped Jessica in her latest attempt to impersonate her. When she returns to the school to confront Margo and save Jessica, Elizabeth finds Nora there in her place. Remorseful, Nora confesses to her wrongdoing, claiming she thought Jessica was Margo who had betrayed her and that she had murdered her own evil sister. Despite Liz feeling sympathy for her, Nora is arrested for her crimes.
7	Elizabeth's Secret Diary Volume II	Francine Pascal	Random House	July 1, 1996
Elizabeth Wakefield has never felt so panicked! She's supposed to be completely in love with Todd, but all she can think about is Jeffrey. She broke up with Jeffrey because Todd moved back from Vermont and she wanted to give their love another chance. Elizabeth loves Todd, but she can't keep pretending that her feelings for Jeffrey have stopped. When Elizabeth sees a forlorn Jeffrey at the Dairi Burger, she MUST talk to him. What will happen? And what if Todd finds out?
8	Jessica's Secret Diary Volume II	Francine Pascal	Random House	July 1, 1996
Romance blooms between Todd and Jessica while Todd is still in Vermont, and Jessica is still seeing others. She spends the summer planning a surprise party for Lila and wondering who she should be with. One night after a fight between Liz and Todd, Jessica considers the two of them together again...
9	Elizabeth's Secret Diary Volume III	Francine Pascal	Random House	June 9, 1997
Sam Woodruff + Elizabeth = A secret fling down the drain.
10	Jessica's Secret Diary Volume III	Francine Pascal	Random House	June 9, 1997
A movie director offers Jessica the starring role in a movie!
11	The Fowlers of Sweet Valley	Francine Pascal	Random House	November 1, 1996
The story of Lila Fowler's ancestors.
12	The Patmans of Sweet Valley	Francine Pascal	Random House	December 1, 1996
The story of Bruce and Roger Patman's ancestors.
