= Deceit (disambiguation) =

Deceit is the propagation of beliefs that are not true.

Deceit may also refer to:

== Books ==
- Deceit, c. 1920 book of cartoons by Harry Furniss
- Deceit (1993, by Peter Darvill-Evans), the eighth of the Virgin New Adventures series of Doctor Who novels
- Deceit, 1993 novel by Clare Francis
- Deceit, 2006 novel by James Siegel

== Film and television ==
- Deceit (1923 film), a drama directed by Oscar Micheaux
- Deceit (1932 film), a drama directed by Albert Ray
- Deceit (1952 film), an Italian drama film directed by Guido Brignone
- Deceit, the first working title of Family Plot, a 1976 detective film directed by Alfred Hitchcock
- Deceit (1989 film), a science fiction film directed by Albert Pyun
- Deceit (1999 film), an Italian mystery film
- Deceit (2004 film), a crime drama directed by John Sacret Young
- Deceit, a 2006 film with Matt Long
- Deceit (2009 film), a short film by Gary Brockette
- Deceit (2017 film), the UK title of US film Where Is Kyra? directed by Andrew Dosunmu
- Deceit (2000 miniseries), a mystery television serial
- Deceit (2021 miniseries), a drama about a 1992 police honeytrap operation in the UK

== Games ==
- Deceit (video game), a game released in 2016

== Music ==
- Deceit (album), a 1981 album by This Heat
- "Deceit", song by Suffocation from Souls to Deny 2004

== Other uses ==
- Deceit (horse), a racehorse
- Tort of deceit, a type of legal injury
- Deceit, an island and an islet in the Hermite Islands archipelago

== See also ==
- Cape Deceit
