= Kambal, Karibal =

Philippine television drama series

- Title card
- Also known as: Heart & Soul
- Genre: Horror drama
- Created by: Borgy Danao
- Written by: Des Garbes-Severino; Onay Sales; Kutz Enriquez
- Directed by: Don Michael Perez
- Creative director: Roy Iglesias
- Starring: Bianca Umali; Miguel Tanfelix; Pauline Mendoza; Kyline Alcantara
- Theme music composer: Vehnee Saturno
- Opening theme: "Kanlungan" by Hannah Precillas
- Country of origin: Philippines
- Original language: Tagalog
- No. of episodes: 178 (list of episodes)

Production
- Executive producer: Joy Lumboy-Pili
- Camera setup: Multiple-camera setup
- Running time: 24–48 minutes
- Production company: GMA Entertainment Content Group

Original release
- Network: GMA Network
- Release: November 27, 2017 – August 3, 2018

Kambal, Karibal (transl. twin, rival / international title: Heart & Soul) is a Philippine television drama horror series broadcast by GMA Network. Directed by Don Michael Perez, it stars Bianca Umali, Miguel Tanfelix, Pauline Mendoza and Kyline Alcantara. It premiered on November 27, 2017 on the network's Telebabad line up. The series concluded on August 3, 2018, with a total of 178 episodes.

The series is originally titled as Santa Santita. It is streaming online on YouTube.

== Premise ==
The story centers on twins Crisanta and Criselda. Criselda dies due to a rare SCID disease and later retains her spirit that is only visible to her sister Crisanta. Their bond starts to fall apart when they both fall in love with Diego. The rivalry between them builds up when their mother's affections are focused on Crisanta. When Criselda's emotions consume her and her soul finds another person's body to inhabit, she returns to take both her mother's affection and Diego's love.

== Cast and characters ==
Cast

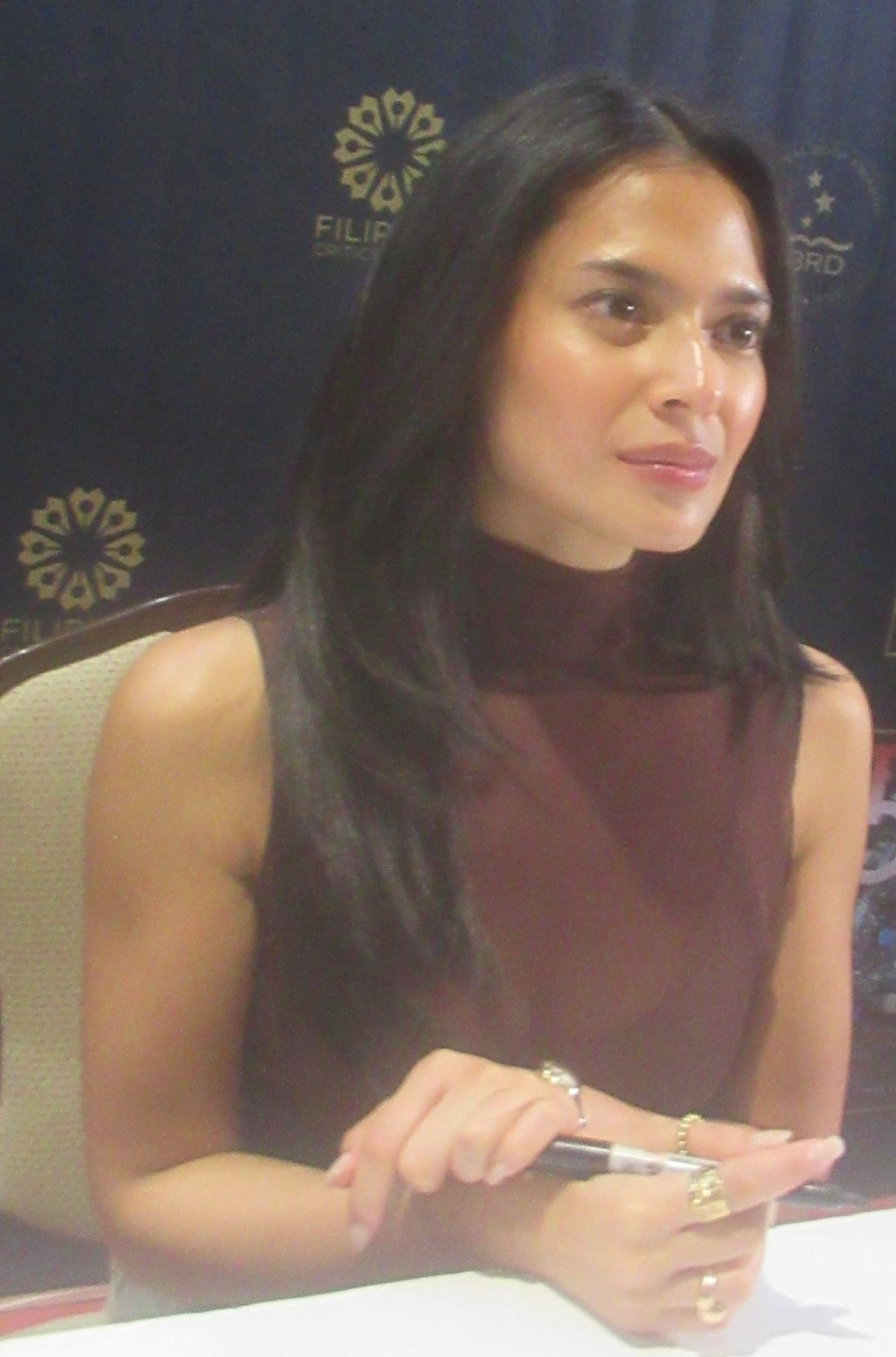
Bianca Umali

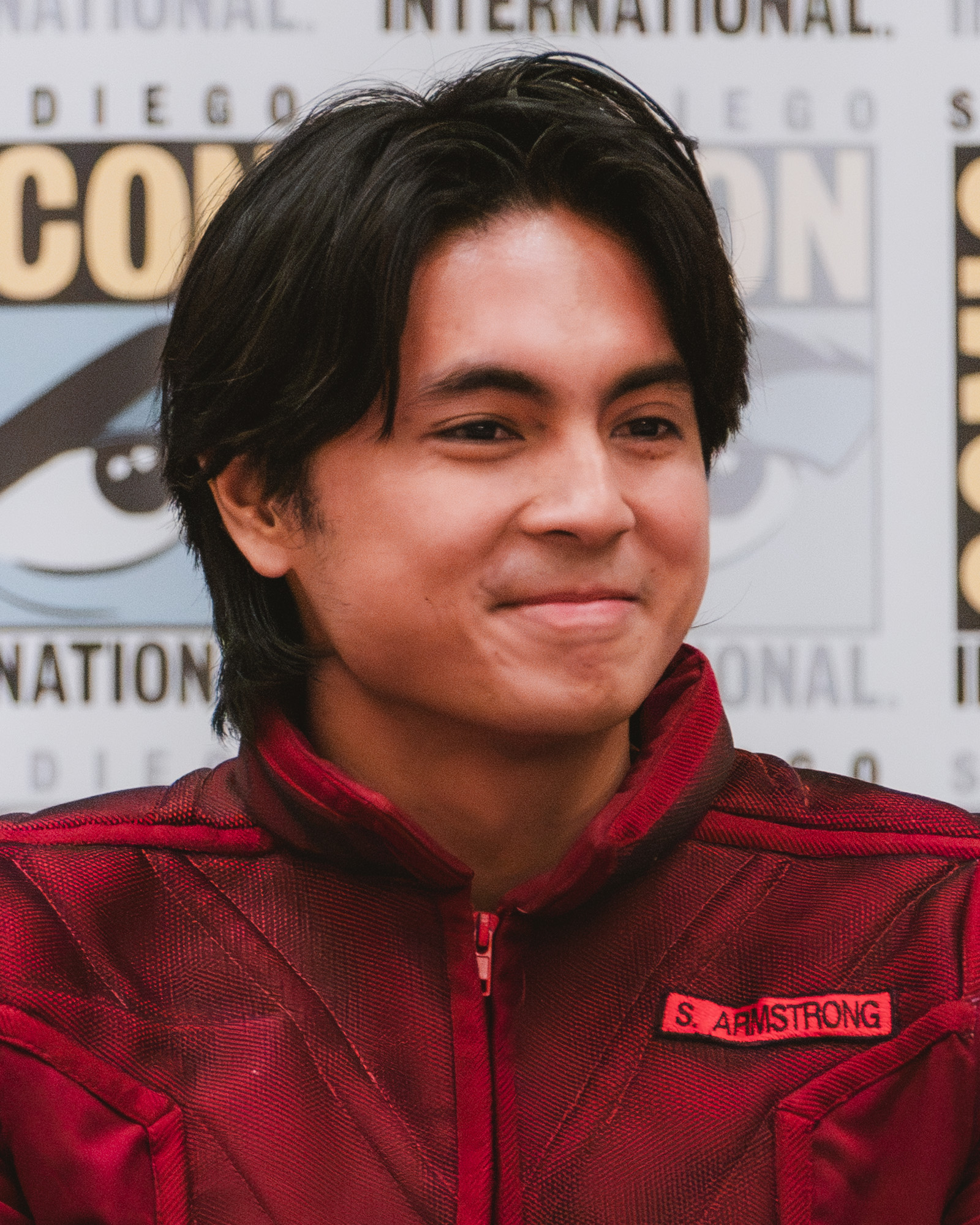
Miguel Tanfelix

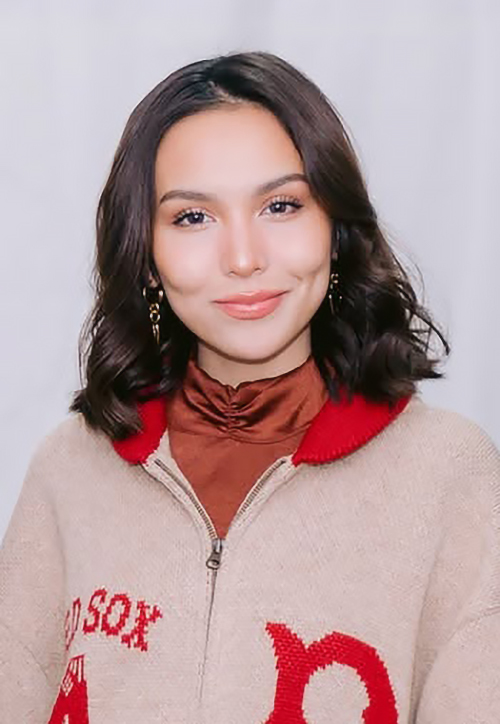
Kyline Alcantara

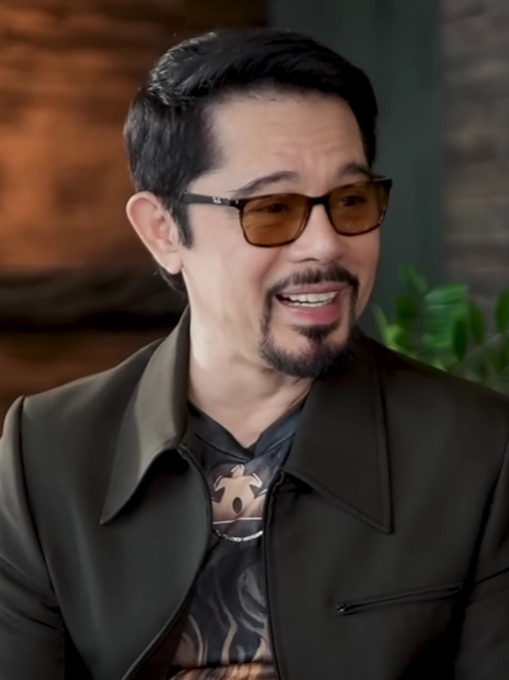
Christopher de Leon

Lead cast

- Bianca Umali as Crisanta "Crisan" Enriquez Magpantay / Victoria Enriquez Magpantay
- Miguel Tanfelix as Diego Ocampo de Villa
- Pauline Mendoza as Criselda "Crisel" Enriquez Magpantay / Amanda Enriquez Magpantay
- Kyline Alcantara as Francheska "Cheska" Enriquez de Villa / Grace Akeem Nazar

Supporting cast

- Jean Garcia as Teresa Abaya
- Marvin Agustin as Raymond de Villa / Samuel Calderon
- Alfred Vargas as Allan Magpantay
- Carmina Villarroel as Geraldine Enriquez
- Gloria Romero as Maria Anicia Enriquez
- Christopher de Leon as Emmanuel "Manuel" de Villa
- Jeric Gonzales as Michael Roy "Makoy" Claveria
- Franchesca Salcedo as Norilyn "Nori" Salcedo / Frenny
- Rafa Siguion-Reyna as Vincent De Jesus
- Sheree Bautista as Lilian Ocampo
- Raquel Monteza as Mildred Abaya

Guest cast

- Gardo Versoza as Noli Bautista
- Katrina Halili as Nida Generoso
- Amalia Rosales as Dolores Amelia
- Rez Cortez as an exorcist
- Robert Ortega as a priest
- Froilan Sales as Jericho
- Mike Lloren as Delfin Claveria
- Miggs Cuaderno as James Martinez
- Tina Paner as Azon Martinez
- Lynn Ynchausti-Cruz as Victoria Magpantay
- Juan Rodrigo as Tomas Magpantay
- Kelvin Miranda as John "Tembong" Enriquez
- Brent Valdez as Jolo
- Angela Evangelista as Olive Enriquez
- Princess Guevarra as Madel Gutierrez
- Tanya Gomez as Edna Gutierrez
- Gerald Madrid as Dado
- Jenny Miller as Lerma
- Elle Ramirez as Jane
- Lou Sison as Luisa
- Angie Ferro as Editha
- Diva Montelaba as Linda
- Arra San Agustin as younger Geraldine
- Therese Malvar as younger Teresa
- Empress Schuck as younger Anicia
- Ashley Cabrera as younger Cheska
- Jazz Yburan as younger Crisan
- Caprice Mendez as younger Crisel and Cristiana Enriquez Magpantay
- Seth dela Cruz as younger Diego
- Marc Justine Alvarez as younger Makoy
- Roence Santos as Ganeva “Black Lady”
- Eliza Pineda as Patricia Gonzales
- Sheila Marie Rodriguez as Jenny Ginez
- Ana Capri as Clara
- Kenken Nuyad as Bugoy
- Lollie Mara as Celia
- Hannah Precillas as Manilyn
- Maureen Larrazabal as Strong Beauty
- Scarlet Petite as Suzy
- Inah de Belen as Phoebe
- Kevin Santos as Xander Liwanag
- Jake Vargas as Darren Olivar
- Maricar de Mesa as Valerie Olivar
- Lianne Valentin as Madeline
- Yasser Marta as Andre
- Sunshine Dizon as Maricar Akeem Nazar
- Ping Medina as Obet
- Tart Carlos as Gladys
- Andrew Gan as Dalton
- Pekto as Olsec
- Dave Bornea as Claudio Calderon
- Luz Fernandez as Magda Liwanag
- Faith da Silva as Maila

== Ratings ==
According to AGB Nielsen Philippines' Nationwide Urban Television Audience Measurement People in television homes, the pilot episode of Kambal, Karibal earned an 8.5% rating. The final episode scored a 13% rating.

== Accolades ==
Accolades received by Kambal, Karibal
Year	Award	Category	Recipient	Result	Ref.
2018	32nd PMPC Star Awards for Television	Best Primetime Drama Series	Kambal, Karibal	Nominated	
2018	32nd PMPC Star Awards for Television	Best Drama Supporting Actress	Kyline Alcantara Pauline Mendoza	Won	
2018	32nd PMPC Star Awards for Television	Best Drama Supporting Actress	Kyline Alcantara Pauline Mendoza	Nominated	
2018	1st Asian Academy Creative Awards	Best Actor in a Leading Role (National)	Miguel Tanfelix	Won	
2018	1st Asian Academy Creative Awards	Best Actress in a Supporting Role (National)	Kyline Alcantara	Won	
2018	4th LionhearTV RAWR Awards	Bet na Bet na Teleserye	Kambal, Karibal	Nominated	
2019	6th Paragala Central Luzon Media Awards	Best Television Actress	Kambal, Karibal	Nominated	
