= List of Kambal, Karibal episodes =

Kambal, Karibal (International title: Heart & Soul / transl. Twin Rival) is a 2017 Philippine television drama series starting Bianca Umali and Miguel Tanfelix. The series premiered on GMA Network's GMA Telebabad evening block and worldwide on GMA Pinoy TV on November 27, 2017 to August 3, 2018, replacing the second season of Alyas Robin Hood.

NUTAM (Nationwide Urban Television Audience Measurement) People in Television Homes ratings are provided by AGB Nielsen Philippines. The series ended, but its the 35th-week run, and with a total of 178 episodes. It was replaced by Onanay.

== Series overview ==
Kambal, Karibal is divided into two seasons. The first season features the original story, and ends with a teaser revealing that it was Raymond who had ended up on the island, and Allan and Geraldine find their twins. The second season included the new characters of Selya, Darren and Valerie. As a result, the following week though shows otherwise. Now, since this extension was only until May, we actually see a conclusion or semi-closure towards the characters. The series was then extended for the 3rd time, adding the twist of Cheska's return and the addition of Cheska's real mother, Maricar. This is where the second season starts. According to GMA, if the series wasn't extended for the 3rd time (when season 2 starts), the ending of the series would have been a body swap between Crisan and Crisel, living happily together, starting over a new life But due to the series' extension, a new twist was added.

Season	Episodes	Originally released	
Season	Episodes	First released	Last released
1	118	November 27, 2017	May 11, 2018
2	60	May 14, 2018	August 3, 2018

=== Season 1 (2017-2018) ===
==== November 2017 ====
No. overall	No. in season	Episode	Original air date	Social media hashtag	AGB Nielsen NUTAM People in Television Homes			Ref.
No. overall	No. in season	Episode	Original air date	Social media hashtag	Rating	Timeslot rank	Whole day rank	Ref.
1	1	"Pilot"	November 27, 2017	#KambalKaribal	8.5%	#2		
2	2	"Stolen Twins"	November 28, 2017	#KKStolenTwins	8.8%	#2		
3	3	"SCID"	November 29, 2017	#KKSCID	9.0%	#2		
4	4	"New Life"	November 30, 2017	#KKNewLife	9.0%	#2		
Average					8.9%			

==== December 2017 ====
No. overall	No. in season	Episode	Original air date	Social media hashtag	AGB Nielsen NUTAM People in Television Homes			Ref.
No. overall	No. in season	Episode	Original air date	Social media hashtag	Rating	Timeslot rank	Whole day rank	Ref.
5	5	"Only Hope"	December 1, 2017	#KKOnlyHope	9.4%	#2	#4	
6	6	"Father's Love"	December 4, 2017	#KKFathersLove	9.2%	#2	#6	
7	7	"Paalam" (Farewell)	December 5, 2017	#KKPaalam	9.1%	#2	#6	
8	8	"Goodbye"	December 6, 2017	#KKGoodbye	9.9%	#2	#6	
9	9	"Crisel's Ghost"	December 7, 2017	#KKCriselsGhost	9.4%	#2	#6	
10	10	"Pagtatagpo" (Encounter)	December 8, 2017	#KKPagtatagpo	9.3%	#2	#6	
11	11	"Pakiusap" (Please)	December 11, 2017	#KKPakiusap	9.0%	#2	#6	
12	12	"Pagsubok" (Trial)	December 12, 2017	#KKPagsubok	8.9%	#2	#6	
13	13	"Pageant"	December 13, 2017	#KKPageant	9.2%	#2	#4	
14	14	"Pagtatagpo" (Coming Together)	December 14, 2017	#KKPagtatagpo	8.8%	#2	#6	
15	15	"Confrontation"	December 15, 2017	#KKConfrontation	8.0%	#2	#6	
16	16	"Selos" (Envy)	December 18, 2017	#KKSelos	9.5%	#2	#4	
17	17	"Pagbabalik" (Return)	December 19, 2017	#KKPagbabalik	9.6%	#2	#4	
18	18	"Moving On"	December 20, 2017	#KKMovingOn	8.8%	#2	#4	
19	19	"Mother's Love"	December 21, 2017	#KKMothersLove	8.9%	#2	#4	
20	20	"Malikmata" (Illusion)	December 22, 2017	#KKMalikmata	8.5%	#2	#6	
21	21	"Twenty-First Episode"	December 25, 2017'	#KambalKaribal	6.7%	#2	#6	
22	22	"Haunting"	December 26, 2017	#KKHaunting	8.0%	#2	#6	
23	23	"Bistado" (Seen)	December 27, 2017	#KKBistado	8.4%	#2	#6	
24	24	"Palusot" (Reason)	December 28, 2017	#KKPalusot	9.0%	#2	#5	
25	25	"Yakap" (Hug)	December 29, 2017	#KKYakap	8.9%	#2	#4	
Average					8.9%			

==== January 2018 ====
No. overall	No. in season	Episode	Original air date	Social media hashtag	AGB Nielsen NUTAM People in Television Homes			Ref.
No. overall	No. in season	Episode	Original air date	Social media hashtag	Rating	Timeslot rank	Whole day rank	Ref.
26	26	"Lihim" (Secret)	January 1, 2018	#KKLihim	7.8%	#2	#6	
27	27	"Accident"	January 2, 2018	#KKAccident	9.0%	#2	#6	
28	28	"Nagpakita" (Showed)	January 3, 2018	#KKNagpakita	9.1%	#2	#6	
29	29	"DNA Result"	January 4, 2018	#KKDNAResult	10.0%	#1	#4	
30	30	"Sanib" (Possess)	January 5, 2018	#KKSanib	9.1%	#2	#5	
31	31	"Run Away"	January 8, 2018	#KKRunAway	10.1%	#2	#6	
32	32	"Alone"	January 9, 2018	#KKAlone	9.2%	#2	#6	
33	33	"Rejected"	January 10, 2018	#KKRejected	8.6%	#2	#5	
34	34	"Muling Pagsapi" (Possess Again)	January 11, 2018	#KKMulingPagsapi	9.6%	#2	#6	
35	35	"Duda" (Doubt)	January 12, 2018	#KKDuda	10.0%	#1	#2	
36	36	"Cheska"	January 15, 2018	#KKCheska	10.5%	#1	#2	
37	37	"Pinagtagpo" (Meet)	January 16, 2018	#KKPinagtagpo	11.0%	#1	#3	
38	38	"Malasakit" (Concern)	January 17, 2018	#KKMalasakit	9.7%	#1	#3	
39	39	"Pagtataka" (Wondering)	January 18, 2018	#KKPagtataka	10.6%	#2	#4	
40	40	"Pagtatapat" (Adduction)	January 19, 2018	#KKPagtatapat	9.5%	#1	#3	
41	41	"Cheska at 18"	January 22, 2018	#KKCheskaAt18	9.8%	#1	#2	
42	42	"Pag-amin" (Confession)	January 23, 2018	#KKPagAmin	10.5%	#1	#2	
43	43	"Hinala" (Suspicion)	January 24, 2018	#KKHinala	10.2%	#1	#2	
44	44	"Makaawa" (Mercy)	January 25, 2018	#KKMakaawa	10.1%	#1	#2	
45	45	"Suspetsa" (Suspect)	January 26, 2018	#KKSuspetsa	10.2%	#1	#3	
46	46	"Pagsubok kay Cheska" (Trial for Cheska)	January 29, 2018	#KKPagsubokKayCheska	10.0%	#2	#4	
47	47	"Crisel's Fear"	January 30, 2018	#KKCriselsFear	10.4%	#1	#2	
48	48	"Pangamba" (Fear)	January 31, 2018	#KKPangamba	9.8%	#2	#4	
Average					9.7%			

==== February 2018 ====
No. overall	No. in season	Episode	Original air date	Social media hashtag	AGB Nielsen NUTAM People in Television Homes			Ref.
No. overall	No. in season	Episode	Original air date	Social media hashtag	Rating	Timeslot rank	Whole day rank	Ref.
49	49	"Panic"	February 1, 2018	#KKPanic	9.8%	#2	#4	
50	50	"Pagtatakip sa Kasalanan" (Covering Sins)	February 2, 2018	#KKPagtatakipSaKasalanan	10.1%	#2	#4	
51	51	"Sumbong" (Complaint)	February 5, 2018	#KKSumbong	9.3%	#2	#3	
52	52	"Galit" (Anger)	February 6, 2018	#KKGalit	9.6%	#2	#4	
53	53	"Mapagpanggap" (Pretentious)	February 7, 2018	#KKMapagpanggap	9.0%	#2	#4	
54	54	"Paghaharap" (Confrontation)	February 8, 2018	#KKPaghaharap	10.8%	#1	#2	
55	55	"Katotohanan" (Truth)	February 9, 2018	#KKKatotohanan	10.4%	#2	#2	
56	56	"Banta" (Threat)	February 12, 2018	#KKBanta	9.9%	#1	#3	
57	57	"Tulong" (Favor)	February 13, 2018	#KKTulong	9.7%	#2	#3	
58	58	"Plano" (Plan)	February 14, 2018	#KKPlano	9.5%	#2	#3	
59	59	"Pagpaalis" (Expulsion)	February 15, 2018	#KKPagpaalis	10.0%	#2	#3	
60	60	"Hindi Bibitiw" (Will not Give up!)	February 16, 2018	#KKHindiBibitiw	9.0%	#2	#3	
61	61	"Maangmaangan" (hypocritical)	February 19, 2018	#KKMaangmaangan	9.5%	#2	#4	
62	62	"Matatag" (Stable)	February 20, 2018	#KKMatatag	9.5%	#2	#4	
63	63	"Diskarte" (Strategy)	February 21, 2018	#KKDiskarte	9.7%	#2	#3	
64	64	"Bangayan" (Wrangle)	February 22, 2018	#KKBangayan	10.2%	#2	#3	
65	65	"Hindi Susuko" (Not Giving Up)	February 23, 2018	#KKHindiSusuko	8.9%	#2	#4	
66	66	"Takas" (Escape)	February 26, 2018	#KKTakas	10.0%	#2	#3	
67	67	"Lola Anicia" (Grandma' Anicia)	February 27, 2018	#KKLolaAnicia	9.3%	#2	#5	
68	68	"Dalamhati" (Grief)	February 28, 2018	#KKDalamhati	10.4%	#2	#3	
Average					9.7%			

==== March 2018 ====
No. overall	No. in season	Episode	Original air date	Social media hashtag	AGB Nielsen NUTAM People in Television Homes			Ref.
No. overall	No. in season	Episode	Original air date	Social media hashtag	Rating	Timeslot rank	Whole day rank	Ref.
69	69	"Pagpaparaya" (Letting Go)	March 1, 2018	#KKPagpaparaya	9.6%	#2	#4	
70	70	"Kasunduan" (Agreement)	March 2, 2018	#KKKasunduan	8.7%	#2	#4	
71	71	"Alok" (Offer)	March 5, 2018	#KKAlok	8.5%	#2	#3	
72	72	"Pagkainggit" (Jealousy)	March 6, 2018	#KKPagkainggit	9.1%	#2	#3	
73	73	"Crisan on Fire"	March 7, 2018	#KKCrisanOnFire	9.3%	#2	#4	
74	74	"Kampihan" (Teaming Up)	March 8, 2018	#KKKampihan	10.3%	#2	#3	
75	75	"Aksidente" (Accident)	March 9, 2018	#KKAksidente	10.0%	#2	#3	
76	76	"Pagdidiin" (Emphasize)	March 12, 2018	#KKPagdidiin	10.3%	#2	#3	
77	77	"Revelation"	March 13, 2018	#KKRevelation	10.6%	#1	#2	
78	78	"Agawan" (Rivalry)	March 14, 2018	#KKAgawan	10.8%	#2	#3	
79	79	"Bagong Katawan" (New Body)	March 15, 2018	#KKBagongKatawan	11.6%	#1	#2	
80	80	"Face Off"	March 16, 2018	#KKFaceOff	11.1%	#2	#3	
81	81	"Sibling Rivalry"	March 19, 2018	#KKSiblingRivalry	—N/a			
82	82	"Matinding Pagtatalo" (Intense Dispute)	March 20, 2018	#KKMatindingPagtatalo	—N/a			
83	83	"Bintang" (Imputation)	March 21, 2018	#KKBintang	—N/a			
84	84	"Frame Up"	March 22, 2018	#KKFrameUp	—N/a			
85	85	"In Danger"	March 23, 2018	#KKInDanger	10.1%	#2	#3	
86	86	"Captive"	March 26, 2018	#KKCaptive	11.2%	#2	#3	
87	87	"Walang Iwanan" (Without Leaving)	March 27, 2018	#KKWalangIwanan	12.3%	#1	#2	
88	88	"Habulan" (Chase)	March 28, 2018	#KKHabulan	12.3%	#1		
Average					10.4%			

==== April 2018 ====
No. overall	No. in season	Episode	Original air date	Social media hashtag	AGB Nielsen NUTAM People in Television Homes			Ref.
No. overall	No. in season	Episode	Original air date	Social media hashtag	Rating	Timeslot rank	Whole day rank	Ref.
89	89	"Pagtataksil" (Betrayal)	April 2, 2018	#KKPagtataksil				
90	90	"Pinagkaisahan" (Consensus)	April 3, 2018	#KKPinagkaisahan	11.6%	#1		
91	91	"Wanted"	April 4, 2018	#KKWanted				
92	92	"Pagtatago" (Hiding)	April 5, 2018	#KKPagtatago				
93	93	"Salisihan" (To Avoid)	April 6, 2018	#KKSalisihan				
94	94	"Pangungulila" (Desolation)	April 9, 2018	#KKPangungulila				
95	95	"Paghabol" (Chasing)	April 10, 2018	#KKPaghabol				
96	96	"Welcome Darren"	April 11, 2018	#KKWelcomeDarren				
97	97	"Apology"	April 12, 2018	#KKApology				
98	98	"New Friend"	April 13, 2018	#KKNewFriend				
99	99	"Pagdududa" (Doubt)	April 16, 2018	#KKPagdududa				
100	100	"Pagligtas" (Saving)	April 17, 2018	#KKPagligtas	11.1%	#2		
101	101	"Getting Closer"	April 18, 2018	#KKGettingCloser				
102	102	"Pagtutuos" (Reckoning)	April 19, 2018	#KKPagtutuos				
103	103	"Prime Suspect"	April 20, 2018	#KKPrimeSuspect				
104	104	"Arestado" (Arrested)	April 23, 2018	#KKArestado				
105	105	"Liar"	April 24, 2018	#KKLiar				
106	106	"Muling Paghaharap" (Reconfrontation)	April 25, 2018	#KKMulingPaghaharap				
107	107	"Raymond's Revenge"	April 26, 2018	#KKRaymondsRevenge	12.8%	#1		
108	108	"Proposal"	April 27, 2018	#KKProposal	12.2%	#1		
109	109	"Agaw Buhay" (Dying)	April 30, 2018	#KKAgawBuhay				
Average								

==== May 2018 ====
No. overall	No. in season	Episode	Original air date	Social media hashtag	AGB Nielsen NUTAM People in Television Homes			Ref.
No. overall	No. in season	Episode	Original air date	Social media hashtag	Rating	Timeslot rank	Whole day rank	Ref.
110	110	"Pagkumpirma" (Confirmation)	May 1, 2018	#KKPagkumpirma				
111	111	"Third Eye"	May 2, 2018	#KKThirdEye				
112	112	"Pagmulat" (Awake)	May 3, 2018	#KKPagmulat	12.6%	#1		
113	113	"Crisan"	May 4, 2018	#KKCrisan	12.6%	#1		
114	114	"Galit ni Crisel" (Crisel's Anger)	May 7, 2018	#KKGalitNiCrisel				
115	115	"Higanti" (Revenge)	May 8, 2018	#KKHiganti				
116	116	"Panganib" (Risk)	May 9, 2018	#KKPanganib	12.0%	#1		
117	117	"In Danger"	May 10, 2018	#KKInDanger	12.0%	#1		
118	118	"Soul Switching"	May 11, 2018	#KKSoulSwitching				
Average								

=== Season 2 (2018) ===
==== May 2018 ====
No. overall	No. in season	Episode	Original air date	Social media hashtag	AGB Nielsen NUTAM People in Television Homes			Ref.
No. overall	No. in season	Episode	Original air date	Social media hashtag	Rating	Timeslot rank	Whole day rank	Ref.
119	1	"Bagong Buhay" (New Life)	May 14, 2018	#KKBagongBuhay				
120	2	"Hinagpis" (Resentment)	May 15, 2018	#KKHinagpis				
121	3	"Flatline"	May 16, 2018	#KKFlatline	12.3%	#1		
122	4	"Bagong Pagsubok" (New Trial)	May 17, 2018	#KKBagongPagsubok				
123	5	"Paniningil" (Payback)	May 18, 2018	#KKPaniningil	11.6%	#1		
124	6	"Pagsulsol" (Seduction)	May 21, 2018	#KKPagsulsol				
125	7	"Pagtatakpan" (Cover)	May 22, 2018	#KKPagtatakpan	10.9%	#2		
126	8	"Discovery"	May 23, 2018	#KKDiscovery				
127	9	"Betrayal"	May 24, 2018	#KKBetrayal				
128	10	"Pagtatanggol" (Defending)	May 25, 2018	#KKPagtatanggol	11.6%	#1		
129	11	"Matinding Galit" (Wrath)	May 28, 2018	#KKMatindingGalit				
130	12	"Paghahanap" (Searching)	May 29, 2018	#KKPaghahanap				
131	13	"Pagtugis" (Pursuit)	May 30, 2018	#KKPagtugis	10.9%	#1		
132	14	"Last Hope"	May 31, 2018	#KKLastHope	12.3%	#1		
Average								

==== June 2018 ====
No. overall	No. in season	Episode	Original air date	Social media hashtag	AGB Nielsen NUTAM People in Television Homes			Ref.
No. overall	No. in season	Episode	Original air date	Social media hashtag	Audience Share	Timeslot rank	Whole day rank	Ref.
133	15	"Peligro" (Risk)	June 1, 2018	#KKPeligro				
134	16	"Kapahamakan" (Disaster)	June 4, 2018	#KKKapahamakan				
135	17	"Pananakot" (Intimidation)	June 5, 2018	#KKPananakot				
136	18	"Crisan's Temptation"	June 6, 2018	#KKCrisansTemptation				
137	19	"Patibong" (Trap)	June 7, 2018	#KKPatibong	12.1%	#1		
138	20	"Guilt"	June 8, 2018	#KKGuilt	11.8%	#1		
139	21	"Deadline"	June 11, 2018	#KKDeadline				
140	22	"Cheska's Mother"	June 12, 2018	#KKCheskasMother				
141	23	"The Search"	June 13, 2018	#KKTheSearch				
142	24	"Harapan" (Facade)	June 14, 2018	#KKHarapan				
143	25	"Pagtatangka" (Attempt)	June 15, 2018	#KKPagtatangka	12.5%	#1		
144	26	"Paliwanag" (Explanation)	June 18, 2018	#KKPaliwanag				
145	27	"Panggugulo" (Trouble)	June 19, 2018	#KKPanggugulo				
146	28	"Pagsaklolo" (Helping)	June 20, 2018	#KKPagsaklolo				
147	29	"Tampuhan" (Displeasure)	June 21, 2018	#KKTampuhan				
148	30	"Desperate Moves"	June 22, 2018	#KKDesperateMoves				
149	31	"Pagsagip" (Rescue)	June 25, 2018	#KKPagsagip				
150	32	"Pagtawag" (Calling)	June 26, 2018	#KKPagtawag				
151	33	"Deception"	June 27, 2018	#KKDeception				
152	34	"Affection"	June 28, 2018	#KKAffection				
153	35	"Pasabog" (Petard)	June 29, 2018	#KKPasabog				
Average								

==== July 2018 ====
No. overall	No. in season	Episode	Original air date	Social media hashtag	AGB Nielsen NUTAM People in Television Homes			Ref.
No. overall	No. in season	Episode	Original air date	Social media hashtag	Audience Share	Timeslot rank	Whole day rank	Ref.
154	36	"Anger"	July 2, 2018	#KKAnger				
155	37	"Pagtakas" (Escaping)	July 3, 2018	#KKPagtakas				
156	38	"Payback"	July 4, 2018	#KKPayback				
157	39	"Chase"	July 5, 2018	#KKChase				
158	40	"Compromise"	July 6, 2018	#KKCompromise				
159	41	"Pagtaboy" (Departure)	July 9, 2018	#KKPagtaboy				
160	42	"Ganti" (Revenge)	July 10, 2018	#KKGanti				
161	43	"Envy"	July 11, 2018	#KKEnvy				
162	44	"Death"	July 12, 2018	#KKDeath				
163	45	"Tagapagmana" (Heiress)	July 13, 2018	#KKTagapagmana				
164	46	"Bagong Panganib" (New Danger)	July 16, 2018	#KKBagongPanganib	11.0%	#1		
165	47	"Pinsan" (Cousin)	July 17, 2018	#KKPinsan	9.8%	#1		
166	48	"Nakaambang Panganib" (New Risk)	July 18, 2018	#KKNakaambangPanganib	10.0%	#1		
167	49	"Halik" (Kiss)	July 19, 2018	#KKHalik	9.6%	#1		
168	50	"Sorpresa" (Surprise)	July 20, 2018	#KKSorpresa	10.7%	#1		
169	51	"Pakana" (Scheme)	July 23, 2018	#KKPakana	9.7%	#1		
170	52	"Scheme"	July 24, 2018	#KKScheme	11.3%	#1		
171	53	"Trapped"	July 25, 2018	#KKTrapped	10.5%	#2	#4	
172	54	"Eskapo" (Escape)	July 26, 2018	#KKEskapo	10.9%	#1		
173	55	"Misteryo" (Mystery)	July 27, 2018	#KKMisteryo	11.2%	#1		
174	56	"Other World"	July 30, 2018	#KKOtherWorld	11.3%	#1		
175	57	"Power"	July 31, 2018	#KKPower	12.6%	#1	#3	
Average								

==== August 2018 ====
No. overall	No. in season	Episode	Original air date	Social media hashtag	AGB Nielsen NUTAM People in Television Homes			Ref.
No. overall	No. in season	Episode	Original air date	Social media hashtag	Rating	Timeslot rank	Whole day rank	Ref.
176	58	"Kaguluhan" (Chaos)	August 1, 2018	#KKKaguluhan	10.8%	#1	#2	
177	59	"On Board"	August 2, 2018	#KKOnBoard	11.9%	#1	#2	
178	60	"Undying Finale"	August 3, 2018	#KKUndyingFinale	13.0%	#1	#2	
Average					12.0%			
