= Deceptacon (disambiguation) =

Decepticon (possibly misspelled as Deceptacon) is a faction in Transformers.

Deceptacon may also refer to:

- "Deceptacon", a song by Le Tigre from Le Tigre
- "Deceptacon", a song by Robbie Williams from Reality Killed the Video Star
- "Deceptacons", a song by One Be Lo from S.O.N.O.G.R.A.M.
