= Deceit (video game) =

Online multiplayer horror video game

- Developer: World Makers
- Publisher: World Makers
- Series: Deceit
- Engine: Cry Engine
- Platform: Personal computer
- Release: Oct 4, 2016
- Genres: Social deduction, Horror, Survival

Deceit was a free-to-play online social deduction, FPS, horror video game developed and published by World Makers. It first released on PC on October 4th 2016. The second game is Deceit 2. The game's servers shut down on November 6, 2025.

== Gameplay ==
A 6-player group must survive a night in a handful of different locations. Two of the players in the group are monsters that must attempt to murder the other four survivors before escaping. However, no group members appear to be monsters, and the two secret monsters are the only ones who know that they are the actual monsters.
