= List of Beautiful Justice episodes =

Beautiful Justice is a 2019 Philippine television drama series action broadcast by GMA Network. It premiered on the network's Telebabad line up and worldwide on GMA Pinoy TV from September 9, 2019 to January 24, 2020, replacing Sahaya.

== Series overview ==
Season	Episodes	Originally released	
Season	Episodes	First released	Last released
1	40	September 9, 2019	November 1, 2019
2	60	November 4, 2019	January 24, 2020

== Episodes ==
No. overall	No. in season	Title	Social media hashtag	Original release date	Prod. code	AGB Nielsen Ratings (NUTAM People)	Timeslot rank
1	1	"Pilot"	#BeautifulJustice	September 9, 2019	1001 - 01 - A	10.0%	#2
2	2	"Pasabog" (transl. Explosion)	#BJPasabog	September 10, 2019	1002 - 02 - B	10.1%	#2
3	3	"Pagluluksa" (transl. Mourning)	#BJPagluluksa	September 11, 2019	1003 - 03 - C	10.5%	#2
4	4	"Cover Up"	#BJCoverUp	September 12, 2019	1004 - 04 - D	10.4%	#2
5	5	"Bugbog Sarado" (transl. Beaten Up)	#BJBugbogSarado	September 13, 2019	1006 - 06 - F	11.0%	#2
6	6	"Undercover"	#BJUndercover	September 16, 2019	1005 - 05 - E	10.9%	#2
7	7	"Missing Key"	#BJMissingKey	September 17, 2019	1007 - 07 - G	10.3%	#2
8	8	"Deception"	#BJDeception	September 18, 2019	1008 - 08 - H	10.8%	#2
9	9	"Shookt"	#BJShookt	September 19, 2019	1009 - 09 - I	10.4%	#2
10	10	"Alyas Lovi Poe" (transl. Alias Lovi Poe)	#BJAlyasLoviPoe	September 20, 2019	1010 - 10 - J	10.8%	#2
11	11	"Real Lovi Poe"	#BJRealLoviPoe	September 23, 2019	1012 - 12 - L	11.0%	#2
12	12	"Painful Goodbye"	#BJPainfulGoodbye	September 24, 2019	1013 - 13 - M	12.0%	#2
13	13	"New Mission"	#BJNewMission	September 25, 2019	1011 - 11 - K	11.1%	#2
14	14	"Akyat Bahay" (transl. Housebreaker)	#BJAkyatBahay	September 26, 2019	1014 - 14 - N	10.8%	#2
15	15	"Caught in the Act"	#BJCaughtInTheAct	September 27, 2019	1015 - 15 - O	11.7%	#2
16	16	"Breathless"	#BJBreathless	September 30, 2019	1016 - 16 - P	9.1%	#2
17	17	"Solo Fight"	#BJSoloFight	October 1, 2019	1017 - 17 - Q	9.9%	#2
18	18	"Naked Truth"	#BJNakedTruth	October 2, 2019	1018 - 18 - R	10.1%	#2
19	19	"Facing the Enemy"	#BJFacingTheEnemy	October 3, 2019	1019 - 19 - S	9.8%	#2
20	20	"Pasabog Friday" (transl. Explosive Friday)	#BJPasabogFriday	October 4, 2019	1020 - 20 - T	11.2%	#2
21	21	"Round Two"	#BJRoundTwo	October 7, 2019	1021 - 21 - U	8.4%	#2
22	22	"Truth or Lie"	#BJTruthOrLie	October 8, 2019	1022 - 22 - V	10.5%	#2
23	23	"Vin vs. Lance"	#BJVinVsLance	October 9, 2019	1023 - 23 - W	10.8%	#2
24	24	"Deep Truth Uncovered"	#BJDeepTruthUncovered	October 10, 2019	1024 - 24 - X	10.1%	#2
25	25	"One Million"	#BJOneMillion	October 11, 2019	1025 - 25 - Y	9.2%	#2
26	26	"Planted"	#BJPlanted	October 14, 2019	1026 - 26 - Z	9.9%	#2
27	27	"Inosente Ako" (transl. I'm Innocent)	#BJInosenteAko	October 15, 2019	1027 - 27 - AA	10.1%	#2
28	28	"Reyna ng Selda" (transl. Queen of the Prison Cell)	#BJReynaNgSelda	October 16, 2019	1028 - 28 - BB	9.0%	#2
29	29	"Riot, Walang Matutulog" (transl. Sleepless Riot)	#BJRiotWalangMatutulog	October 17, 2019	1029 - 29 - CC	9.8%	#2
30	30	"Jailhouse Rumble"	#BJJailhouseRumble	October 18, 2019	1030 - 30 - DD	9.9%	#2
31	31	"Round Three: Alice vs. Miranda"	#BJRoundThreeAliceVsMiranda	October 21, 2019	1033 - 33 - GG	9.5%	#2
32	32	"Ayaw Paawat" (transl. Daring)	#BJAyawPaawat	October 22, 2019	1031 - 31 - EE	9.8%	#2
33	33	"Sagupaan" (transl. Clash)	#BJSagupaan	October 23, 2019	1032 - 32 - FF	9.8%	#2
34	34	"Walang Kawala" (transl. No Escape)	#BJWalangKawala	October 24, 2019	1034 - 34 - HH	9.5%	#2
35	35	"Palaban" (transl. Tough)	#BJPalaban	October 25, 2019	1035 - 35 - II	9.8%	#2
36	36	"Dinukot" (transl. Kidnapped)	#BJDinukot	October 28, 2019	1036 - 36 - JJ	9.4%	#2
37	37	"Rescue Mission"	#BJRescueMission	October 29, 2019	1037 - 37 - KK	9.5%	#2
38	38	"Di Nakahinga" (transl. Can't Breathe)	#BJDiNakahinga	October 30, 2019	1038 - 38 - LL	9.1%	#2
39	39	"Traitor"	#BJTraitor	October 31, 2019	1039 - 39 - MM	9.4%	#2
40	40	"Zombie Mode"	#BJZombieMode	November 1, 2019	1040 - 40 - NN	9.0%	#2
41	41	"Assault"	#BJAssault	November 4, 2019	1042 - 42 - PP	9.4%	#2
42	42	"Maling Hudas" (transl. Wrong Devil)	#BJMalingHudas	November 5, 2019	1041 - 41 - OO	9.1%	#2
43	43	"Beast Mode"	#BJBeastMode	November 6, 2019	1043 - 43 - QQ	9.9%	#2
44	44	"Patakas" (transl. Escape)	#BJPatakas	November 7, 2019	1044 - 44 - RR	9.0%	#2
45	45	"Trauma"	#BJTrauma	November 8, 2019	1045 - 45 - SS	9.0%	#2
46	46	"First Time"	#BJFirstTime	November 11, 2019	1046 - 46 - TT	9.9%	#2
47	47	"Bawal Sumabit" (transl. No Lodging)	#BJBawalSumabit	November 12, 2019	1047 - 47 - UU	9.8%	#2
48	48	"Massacre"	#BJMassacre	November 13, 2019	1048 - 48 - VV	9.0%	#2
49	49	"Hulihin ang Hudas" (transl. Catch the Devil)	#BJHulihinAngHudas	November 14, 2019	1050 - 50 - XX	9.1%	#2
50	50	"Kasal o Sakal?" (transl. Wedding or Choking?)	#BJKasalOSakal	November 15, 2019	1051 - 51 - YY	9.3%	#2
51	51	"Shocking Reality"	#BJShockingReality	November 18, 2019	1049 - 49 - WW	8.8%	#2
52	52	"Torn"	#BJTorn	November 19, 2019	1052 - 52 - ZZ	8.9%	#2
53	53	"No to Body Shaming"	#BJNoToBodyShaming	November 20, 2019	1053 - 53 - AAA	8.3%	#2
54	54	"Pagalingan" (transl. Competition)	#BJPagalingan	November 21, 2019	1054 - 54 - BBB	8.7%	#2
55	55	"Exposed"	#BJExposed	November 22, 2019	1055 - 55 - CCC	9.0%	#2
56	56	"Bugbog Sarado" (transl. Unconscious)	#BJBugbogSarado	November 25, 2019	1056 - 56 - DDD	8.7%	#2
57	57	"Ganti ng Sindikato" (transl. Syndicate's Revenge)	#BJGantiNgSindikato	November 26, 2019	1057 - 57 - EEE	9.1%	#2
58	58	"Revenge"	#BJRevenge	November 27, 2019	1058 - 58 - FFF	9.8%	#2
59	59	"Galit" (transl. Anger)	#BJGalit	November 28, 2019	1059 - 59 - GGG	9.1%	#2
60	60	"Wrong Move"	#BJWrongMove	November 29, 2019	1060 - 60 - HHH	9.2%	#2
61	61	"Wag Papahuli" (transl. Don't Get Caught)	#BJWagPapahuli	December 2, 2019	1062 - 62 - JJJ	10.3%	#2
62	62	"The Real Enemy"	#BJTheRealEnemy	December 3, 2019	1061 - 61 - III	10.1%	#2
63	63	"Pagtakas" (transl. Escape)	#BJPagtakas	December 4, 2019	1063 - 63 - KKK	10.0%	#2
64	64	"Desperado" (transl. Desperate)	#BJDesperado	December 5, 2019	1064 - 64 - LLL	9.2%	#2
65	65	"Bayad Utang" (transl. Owe)	#BJBayadUtang	December 6, 2019	1065 - 65 - MMM	9.3%	#2
66	66	"Galit ni Alice" (transl. Alice's Anger)	#BJGalitNiAlice	December 9, 2019	1066 - 66 - NNN	9.2%	#2
67	67	"Kitchen Wars"	#BJKitchenWars	December 10, 2019	1067 - 67 - OOO	9.1%	#2
68	68	"Unexpected"	#BJUnexpected	December 11, 2019	1069 - 69 - QQQ	9.0%	#2
69	69	"Black Rose"	#BJBlackRose	December 12, 2019	1071 - 71 - SSS	8.8%	#2
70	70	"Agaw Buhay" (transl. Dying)	#BJAgawBuhay	December 13, 2019	1068 - 68 - PPP	8.7%	#2
71	71	"Hulihin si Ninang" (transl. Catch Ninang)	#BJHulihinSiNinang	December 16, 2019	1070 - 70 - RRR	9.7%	#2
72	72	"Karma ni Miranda" (transl. Miranda's Karma)	#BJKarmaNiMiranda	December 17, 2019	1072 - 72 - TTT	9.4%	#2
73	73	"Pagpapalabas" (transl. Release)	#BJPagpapalabas	December 18, 2019	1073 - 73 - UUU	8.1%	#2
74	74	"Revelation"	#BJRevelation	December 19, 2019	1075 - 75 - WWW	8.7%	#2
75	75	"Reconciliation"	#BJReconciliation	December 20, 2019	1074 - 74 - VVV	8.9%	#2
76	76	"Ina-Anak" (transl. Godchild)	#BJInaAnak	December 23, 2019	1076 - 76 - XXX	8.6%	#2
77	77	"Sana Ngayong Pasko" (transl. Hopefully This Christmas)	#BJSanaNgayongPasko	December 24, 2019	1077 - 77 - YYY	7.1%	#2
78	78	"Christmas Elves"	#BJChristmasElves	December 25, 2019	1079 - 79 - a	8.0%	#2
79	79	"Pasabog sa Pasko" (transl. Christmas Surprise)	#BJPasabogSaPasko	December 26, 2019	1078 - 78 - ZZZ	8.4%	#2
80	80	"Miranda's Revenge"	#BJMirandasRevenge	December 27, 2019	1080 - 80 - b	8.5%	#2
81	81	"Hidden Location"	#BJHiddenLocation	December 30, 2019	1081 - 81 - c	8.3%	#2
82	82	"Most Wanted"	#BJMostWanted	December 31, 2019	1082 - 82 - d	8.0%	#2
83	83	"Lock and Load"	#BJLockAndLoad	January 1, 2020	1084 - 84 - f	7.9%	#2
84	84	"Target"	#BJTarget	January 2, 2020	1085 - 85 - g	7.9%	#2
85	85	"Episode 85"	#BeautifulJustice	January 3, 2020	1083 - 83 - e	7.9%	#2
86	86	"Brie vs. Kitkat"	#BJBrieVSKitkat	January 6, 2020	1086 - 86 - h	9.7%	#2
87	87	"Choice"	#BJChoice	January 7, 2020	1087 - 87 - i	9.1%	#2
88	88	"Asar Talo" (transl. Irritable)	#BJAsarTalo	January 8, 2020	1088 - 88 - j	10.2%	#2
89	89	"Gulatan" (transl. Surprise)	#BJGulatan	January 9, 2020	1089 - 89 - k	10.1%	#2
90	90	"Betrayed"	#BJBetrayed	January 10, 2020	1090 - 90 - l	9.9%	#2
91	91	"Pagsisisi" (transl. Regret)	#BJPagsisisi	January 13, 2020	1091 - 91 - m	10.0%	#2
92	92	"Red Lotus"	#BJRedLotus	January 14, 2020	1092 - 92 - n	9.6%	#2
93	93	"Ubusan Ng Lahi" (transl. Consumption of Race)	#BJUbusanNgLahi	January 15, 2020	1094 - 94 - p	10.1%	#2
94	94	"Aftermath"	#BJAftermath	January 16, 2020	1096 - 96 - r	10.3%	#2
95	95	"Hindi Pa Tapos Ang Laban" (transl. The Fight is Not Yet Over)	#BJHindiPaTaposAngLaban	January 17, 2020	1097 - 97 - s	9.0%	#2
96	96	"Matira Matibay" (transl. Survival of the Fittest)	#BJMatiraMatibay	January 20, 2020	1094 - 94 - o	10.2%	#2
97	97	"Unstoppable"	#BJUnstoppable	January 21, 2020	1096 - 96 - q	9.9%	#2
98	98	"Huli Ka" (transl. You're Caught)	#BJHuliKa	January 22, 2020	1098 - 98 - t	9.4%	#2
99	99	"Sagad Na" (transl. To The Limit)	#BJSagadNa	January 23, 2020	1099 - 99 - u	9.9%	#2
100	100	"Happy Ending"	#BJHappyEnding	January 24, 2020	1100 - 100 - v	10.2%	#2
