= Amy Boesky =

American writer

Amy Boesky is an American author and a professor of English at Boston College.

== Life ==
Born in Detroit, Boesky studied her undergraduate degree at Harvard College before completing a M.Phil in Renaissance English at the University of Oxford. After completing her master's degree and returning to the United States, Boesky worked as an editorial assistant and also began work as one of the principal ghostwriters for the Sweet Valley High series originated by Francine Pascal. Boesky's first contribution to the series was the sixteenth novel, Rags to Riches; she would go on to write fifty books for the Sweet Valley franchise while completing a PhD at Harvard University. Boesky finished ghostwriting after earning an assistant professorship.

She currently is a professor at Boston College, where she has taught and researched the history of adolescent fiction and 17th-century English literature and culture, including the history of timepieces and temporal forms. She has written and published widely in this area, from a scholarly book on Renaissance utopias to articles on gifts of timepieces to Queen Elizabeth. She has also published articles on early modern literature and culture on topics such as technologies of timekeeping; early modern museums; Milton and sunspots; Milton’s heaven as dystopia; and elegy, mourning and memory in journals such as ELH, Modern Philology, Milton Studies, and SEL. Her current research interests include genetic subjectivity and narrative.

In addition to her scholarly and ghostwriting work, Boesky has also written a book in verse for children, Planet Was (1990) and What We Have, a creative nonfiction memoir.

Boesky lives in Chestnut Hill with her husband, Jacques, and her two daughters, Sacha and Libby.

== Select publications ==
- Autobiography -- What We Have, Amy Boesky, Gotham; First Edition (August 5, 2010), ISBN 978-1-59240-551-0
- Newspaper commentary -- Genetic testing questions, Amy Boesky, Boston Globe. Boston, Mass., Section: Opinion: Jul 9, 2010. p. A.13, ISSN 0743-1791
- Solving the Crime of Modernity: Nancy Drew in 1930, Amy Boesky, Studies in the Novel Spring 2010 42(1/2) 185
- Milton and the New World in Milton in Context, Amy Boesky, ed. Stephen B. Dobranski, Cambridge Univ Press, 2010
- Sport, Politics, and Literature in the English Renaissance, Amy Boesky, Renaissance Quarterly Summer 2005 58(2) 727
- Aspects of Subjectivity: Society and Individuality from the Middle Ages to Shakespeare and Milton, Amy Boesky, Renaissance Quarterly Fall 2004 57(3) 1150
- Drama and Politics in the English Civil War, Amy Boesky, Renaissance Quarterly Summer 2000 53(2) 608
- Renaissance Utopias and the Problem of History, Amy Boesky, Modern Philology Aug 2000 98(1) 32
- Form and Reform in Renaissance England: Essays in Honor of Barbara Kiefer Lewalski, Amy Boesky, Ed., with Mary Thomas Crane, 2000
- Double time: Women, Watches, and the Gift of Eternity, The Double Voice: Gendered Writing in Early Modern England, Amy Boesky, 2000
- The Maternal Shape of Mourning: A Reconsideration of "Lycidas, Amy Boesky, Modern Philology May 1998 95(4) 463
- Milton, Galileo and Sunspots: Optics and Certainty in Paradise Lost, Amy Boesky, Milton Studies, Vol. 34, Winter 1997, 23-42.
- Writing the New World: Imaginary Voyages and Utopias of the Great Southern Land, Amy Boesky, Renaissance Quarterly Summer 1997 50(2) 581
- The Rest Is Silence, Amy Boesky, JEGP. Journal of English and Germanic Philology Jan 1997 96(1) 122
- Milton's heaven and the model of the English utopia, Amy Boesky, SEL: Studies in English Literature 1500–1900 Winter 1996 36(1) 91
- Nation, miscegenation: Membering utopia in Henry Neville's The Isle of Pines, Amy Boesky, Texas Studies in Literature and Language Summer 1995 37(2) 165
- Reviews -- An Empire Nowhere: England, America, and Literature from Utopia to The Tempest by Jeffrey Knapp, Amy Boesky, Renaissance Quarterly Spring 1995 48(1) 168
- "Outlandish-Fruits": Commissioning Nature for the Museum of Man, Amy Boesky, ELH Summer 1991 58(2) 305
- Fiction: Planet Was, Amy Boesky and illustrated by Nadine Bernard Westcott, School Library Journal Jan 1991 37(1) 68
