= Kelvin Miranda =

Filipino actor, model, and singer (born 1999)

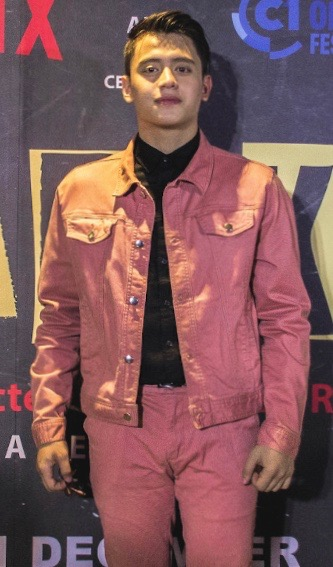
- Miranda in November 2019 at the premiere of Dead Kids.
- Born: Kelvin Manalili Miranda; January 8, 1999 (age 27); Caloocan, Philippines
- Occupations: Actor; model; singer
- Years active: 2016–present
- Agent: GMA Artist Center (2017–present)

Kelvin Manalili Miranda (born January 8, 1999) is a Filipino actor, model and singer. He is best known for his role as Mark Sta. Maria in the Netflix original film Dead Kids (2019) and the lead role in the GTV series The Lost Recipe (2021).

== Early and personal life ==
Miranda was born on January 8, 1999, in Caloocan, Metro Manila, Philippines. He attended Caloocan High School, where he showed signs of becoming a future actor through his participations in school events. He was also looked up to by his schoolmates for his talents in singing, dancing, playing music instruments, and writing poems.

Due to his introversion, Miranda initially faced difficulties trying his luck in the entertainment industry, an idea of his sister.

On 23 December 2021, Miranda dated commercial model Roselle Vytiaco, until they broke up on December 11, 2022, 12 days before their first anniversary.

== Career ==
=== 2016–2018: Career beginnings ===
Miranda's film debut was in the 2016 Star Cinema film Vince and Kath and James, where he appeared in an uncredited role as Kelvin. In 2017 he signed under GMA Artist Center, the talent agency of GMA Network.

For the next few years Miranda would have small parts in a number of GMA television shows, such as Kambal, Karibal, Tadhana, and Magpakailanman. Miranda's film career, meanwhile, was a combination of roles in independent films and various films with Regal Entertainment, such as Haunted Forest, The Hopeful Romantic, and Walwal.

=== 2019–2020: Breakthrough ===
After a series of supporting roles, in 2019, Miranda had a breakthrough role as the lead in the film Dead Kids, the first-ever Netflix original film from the Philippines. Miranda played Mark Santa Maria, a withdrawn teen known to classmates as a "dead kid" — a wallflower and wet blanket; the brainiest yet the poorest in school. The film received positive reviews from critics and Miranda was praised for his lead performance.

=== 2021–present: Rising popularity ===
In 2021, Miranda had his first lead role in television, for the GTV show The Lost Recipe, where he starred opposite Mikee Quintos. He then was later partnered with Beauty Gonzalez in the top-rating afternoon series Stories from the Heart: Loving Miss Bridgette, a forbidden love story of a student and a teacher.

== Filmography ==
=== Film ===
Year	Title	Role	Notes	Ref.
2016	Vince and Kath and James	Kelvin	Uncredited	
2017	Jose Bartolome: Guro	Student	Independent film, bit part	
2017	Haunted Forest	Abner	Bit part	
2018	Accidental Idols (a.k.a. Simplicity, the Movie)	Brett Primo	Independent film; credited but cut from final film	
2018	The Hopeful Romantic	James	Bit part	
2018	Walwal	Tony	Bit part	
2018	Fieldtrip		Independent film, supporting role	
2018	Class of 2018	Ishmael		
2019	One Hugot Away: Beauty and the Hypebeast	Joe	Digital short film	
2019	The Fate	Karl	Independent film	
2019	Ang Henerasyong Sumuko Sa Love	Kerwin	Supporting role	
2019	Dead Kids	Mark Sta. Maria		
2020	D'Ninang	Buchoy		
2023	Ang Mga Kaibigan Ni Mama Susan	Louie		
2023	Missed Connections	Norman	Lead role	
2024	Chances Are, You and I	Soleil Sikat	Lead role	
2025	Everyone Knows Every Juan	Jacob Bukal		
2026	Poon †			
TBA	Sa Tamang Oras at Panahon †			

Year	Title	Role	Notes	Ref.
2016	Vince and Kath and James	Kelvin	Uncredited	
2017	Jose Bartolome: Guro	Student	Independent film, bit part	
2017	Haunted Forest	Abner	Bit part	
2018	Accidental Idols (a.k.a. Simplicity, the Movie)	Brett Primo	Independent film; credited but cut from final film	
2018	The Hopeful Romantic	James	Bit part	
2018	Walwal	Tony	Bit part	
2018	Fieldtrip		Independent film, supporting role	
2018	Class of 2018	Ishmael		
2019	One Hugot Away: Beauty and the Hypebeast	Joe	Digital short film	
2019	The Fate	Karl	Independent film	
2019	Ang Henerasyong Sumuko Sa Love	Kerwin	Supporting role	
2019	Dead Kids	Mark Sta. Maria		
2020	D'Ninang	Buchoy		
2023	Ang Mga Kaibigan Ni Mama Susan	Louie		
2023	Missed Connections	Norman	Lead role	
2024	Chances Are, You and I	Soleil Sikat		
2025	Everyone Knows Every Juan	Jacob Bukal		
2026	Poon †			
TBA	Sa Tamang Oras at Panahon †			

=== Television ===
Year	Title	Role
2017	Kambal, Karibal	Julio Magpantay / John "Tembong" Enriquez
2018	Ang Forever Ko'y Ikaw	Raki
2018	Contessa	Ely's Friend
2018	Ika-5 Utos	Zach
2018–2019	Tadhana	Various roles
2018–2019	Dear Uge	Various roles
2018–2020	Maynila	Various roles
2018–2025	Magpakailanman	Various roles
2019	Stories for the Soul	Pol
2019–2020	Madrasta	Barry Segundo
2020	Daig Kayo ng Lola Ko	Gerald
2021	The Lost Recipe	Harvey Napoleon/Marcelo
2021	Stories from the Heart: Loving Miss Bridgette	Marcus Villareal
2021–2024	Regal Studio Presents	Various roles
2022	Mano Po Legacy: Her Big Boss	Nestor Lorenzo
2022	TOLS	Uno Macaspac
2022–2023	Unica Hija	Ralph Vergara
2023	Walang Matigas na Pulis sa Matinik na Misis	Gary
2025	Happy Crush	Migs
2025–2026	Encantadia Chronicles: Sang'gre	Adamus
2025	Bubble Gang	Guest/Various Roles
2026	Pinoy Big Brother: Celebrity Collab Edition 2.0	Houseguest
2026	Barangay Love Stories: 'Di Ko Maiwasan	Nicko

=== Music videos ===
Year	Title	Artist	Ref.
2020	"Nakikinig Ka Ba Sa Akin"	Ben&Ben	

== Awards and nominations ==
Accolades received by Kelvin Miranda
Award	Year	Category	Nominated Work	Result	Ref.
FAMAS Awards	2025	Best Actor	Chances Are, You and I	Nominated	
PMPC Star Award for Television	2018	Best New Male TV Personality	Bubble Gang	Nominated	
Urduja Film Festival	2019	Best Actor	The Fate	Won	
Urduja Film Festival	2020	Best Actor	Dead Kids	Won	
