= Anak ni Waray vs. Anak ni Biday =

Philippine television drama series

- Title card
- Also known as: Hidden Lies
- Genre: Drama
- Based on: Anak ni Waray vs. Anak ni Biday (1984) by Maryo J. de los Reyes
- Written by: Renato Custodio; Liberty Trinidad; Tina Samson-Velasco; Erwin Bravo; Wiro Michael Ladera
- Directed by: Mark Sicat dela Cruz
- Creative director: Aloy Adlawan
- Starring: Barbie Forteza; Kate Valdez
- Opening theme: "Tayong Dalawa" by Golden Cañedo
- Country of origin: Philippines
- Original language: Tagalog
- No. of episodes: 62

Production
- Executive producer: Arlene del Rosario-Pilapil
- Cinematography: Apollo Anao
- Editors: Robert Ryan Reyes; Noel Mauricio II
- Camera setup: Multiple-camera setup
- Running time: 25–34 minutes
- Production company: GMA Entertainment Group

Original release
- Network: GMA Network
- Release: January 27, 2020 – March 12, 2021

Anak ni Waray vs. Anak ni Biday (transl. child of Waray vs. child of Biday / international title: Hidden Lies) is a Philippine television drama series broadcast by GMA Network. The series is based on a 1984 Philippine film of the same title. Directed by Mark Sicat dela Cruz, it stars Barbie Forteza and Kate Valdez. It premiered on January 27, 2020 on the network's Telebabad line up. The series concluded on March 12, 2021, with a total of 62 episodes.

The series is streaming online on YouTube.

== Cast and characters ==
Cast

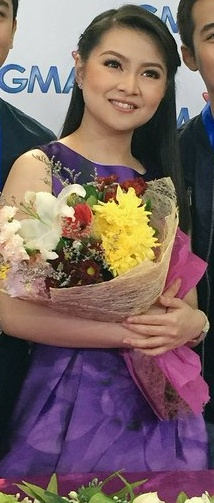
Barbie Forteza

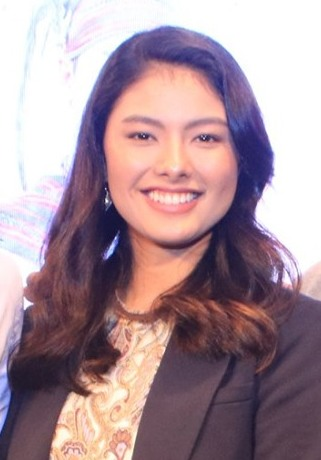
Kate Valdez

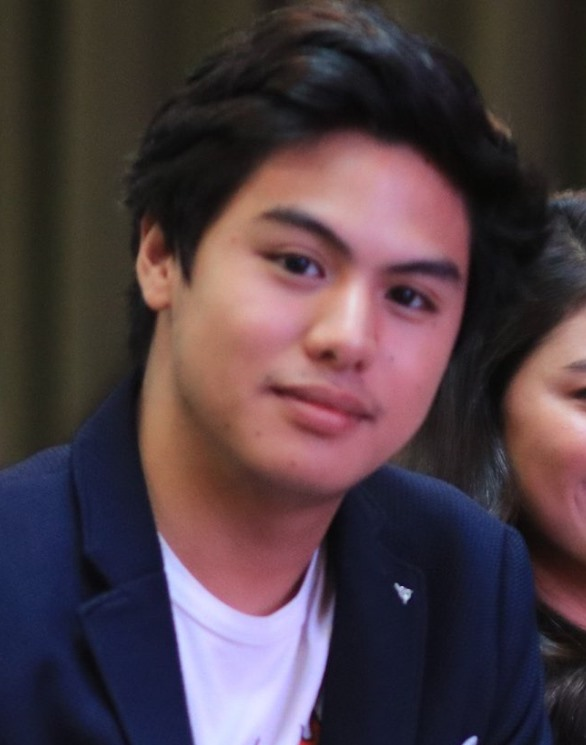
Migo Adecer

Lead cast

- Barbie Forteza as Ginalyn Agpangan Escoto
- Kate Valdez as Caitlyn Malatamban Escoto/Maria Cristina Escoto

Supporting cast

- Snooky Serna as Amelia "Amy" Malatamban
- Dina Bonnevie as Susanna "Sussie" Agpangan
- Migo Adecer as Francisco "Cocoy" Tolentino
- Jay Manalo as Joaquin Escoto
- Jean Saburit as Vanessa Tolentino
- Teresa Loyzaga as Dorcas Escoto-Ñedo
- Faith da Silva as Agatha Escoto Ñedo
- Tanya Montenegro as Glenda Odon
- Benedict Cua as Benedict "Benny" Vargas

Guest cast

- Lovi Poe as younger Sussie
- Max Collins as younger Amy
- Jason Abalos as younger Joaquin
- Pinky Amador as younger Zenaida
- Yana Asistio as younger Glenda
- Pekto as Randy
- Franco Gray Nerona as Joni
- Elle Ramirez as younger Leng
- Karenina Haniel as Beverly
- Ashley Ortega as Alison
- Cai Cortez as Ezra
- Mark Malana as Tony
- Ralph Noriega as Lander
- Jay Arcilla as Luis
- Shermaine Santiago as Lucy
- Celia Rodriguez as Zenaida
- Gladys Guevarra as Leng

== Production ==
Principal photography was halted in March 2020 due to the enhanced community quarantine in Luzon caused by the COVID-19 pandemic. Filming was continued in September 2020. The series resumed its programming on February 8, 2021.

== Ratings ==
According to AGB Nielsen Philippines' Nationwide Urban Television Audience Measurement People in television homes, the pilot episode of Anak ni Waray vs. Anak ni Biday earned a 10.2% rating. The final episode scored a 19.6% rating.
