= Destiny Rose =

Philippine television drama series

- Title card
- Genre: Drama
- Created by: Kutz Enriquez; Wiro Michael Ladera
- Written by: Luningning Interino-Ribay; Christine Novicio; Kenneth Enriquez; Wiro Michael Ladera
- Directed by: Don Michael Perez; Jun Lana; Gina Alajar
- Creative director: Roy Iglesias
- Starring: Ken Chan
- Opening theme: "Ako'y Mahalin" by Maricris Garcia
- Country of origin: Philippines
- Original language: Tagalog
- No. of episodes: 130 (list of episodes)

Production
- Executive producer: Joy Lumboy-Pili
- Cinematography: Carlo Montano
- Editors: Benedict Lavastido; Robert Ryan Reyes
- Camera setup: Multiple-camera setup
- Running time: 23–30 minutes
- Production company: GMA Entertainment TV

Original release
- Network: GMA Network
- Release: September 14, 2015 – March 11, 2016

Destiny Rose is a Philippine television drama series broadcast by GMA Network. Directed by Don Michael Perez, it stars Ken Chan in the title role. It premiered on September 14, 2015 on the network's Afternoon Prime line up. The series concluded on March 11, 2016, with a total of 130 episodes.

The series is streaming online on YouTube.

== Premise ==
Joey Flores-Vegara is a woman trapped in a man's body who dreams and hopes to be the best for her parents. She struggles in life yet continues to be patient and understanding. Joey becomes a stronger person in her new life as Destiny Rose as she faces more challenges in her journey to becoming a renowned writer and a full-fledged woman.

== Cast and characters ==
Lead cast

- Ken Chan as Joselito "Joey" Flores Vergara Jr. / Destiny Rose Vergara-Antonioni

Supporting cast

- Fabio Ide as Gabriele Antonioni
- Manilyn Reynes as Daisy Flores-Vergara
- Michael De Mesa as Rosauro Armani Vitto
- Katrina Halili as Jasmine Vergara Flores
- Sheena Halili as April Rose Flores Vergara
- Jackie Lou Blanco as Maria Dahlia Vergara Flores
- Jeric Gonzales as Vince
- Joko Diaz as Joselito "Lito" Vergara Sr.
- Irma Adlawan as Bethilda Vitto-Jacobs
- JC Tiuseco as Lance
- Ken Alfonso as Aris

Guest cast

- Melissa Mendez as Yvonne Antonioni
- Kate Valdez as Violet Vitto Jacobs
- Sig Aldeen as Mario Capello
- Bryan Benedict as Stephen
- Tony Lapeña as Elvie
- Rene Salud as Salvatore
- Lander Vera Perez as Hector Tobias
- Mimi Juareza as Lady Edelweiss
- Tonio Quiazon as Anton
- Miggs Cuaderno as younger Joey
- Ar Angel Aviles as younger April
- Milkcah Wynne Nacion as younger Jasmine
- Andrea Torres as herself
- Mike Tan as himself
- Yasmien Kurdi as herself

== Production ==
Principal photography concluded on March 2, 2016.

== Ratings ==
According to AGB Nielsen Philippines' Mega Manila household television ratings, the pilot episode of Destiny Rose earned a 14.8% rating. The final episode scored a 17.2% rating.

== Accolades ==
Accolades received by Destiny Rose
Year	Award	Category	Recipient	Result	Ref.
2016	Box Office Entertainment Awards	Most Promising Male Star	Ken Chan	Won	
2016	30th PMPC Star Awards for Television	Best Daytime Drama Series	Destiny Rose	Nominated	
2016	30th PMPC Star Awards for Television	Best Drama Actor	Ken Chan	Nominated	
2016	30th PMPC Star Awards for Television	Best Drama Supporting Actress	Manilyn Reynes	Nominated	
