= Dead Kids (film) =

Filipino thriller film

- Film release poster
- Directed by: Mikhail Red
- Written by: Nikolas Red
- Produced by: Pauline Zamora
- Starring: Kelvin Miranda; Vance Larena; Khalil Ramos; Jan Silverio; Sue Ramirez; Markus Paterson
- Edited by: Nikolas Red
- Production companies: Globe Studios; Pelikula Red; Asmik Ace
- Distributed by: Netflix
- Release dates: November 17, 2019 (Cinema One Originals Film Festival); December 1, 2019
- Running time: 94 minutes
- Country: Philippines
- Language: Filipino

Dead Kids is a Filipino thriller film directed by Mikhail Red and starring Kelvin Miranda, Vance Larena, Sue Ramirez, Khalil Ramos, Jan Silverio, Gabby Padilla, and Markus Paterson. Dead Kids was released on December 1, 2019, on Netflix.

The film received negative reviews from critics, who praised the premise, visuals, and Lorena's performance, but criticized its writing and execution.

== Plot ==
High school student Mark and his crush Janine catch up at a local bar. They discuss Mark's recent acceptance to UP, and Janine asks Mark to help practice for their upcoming play, a rendition of Noli Me Tángere. Chuck, the lead actor and wealthy classmate whom Mark is the understudy to, ridicules him for wearing cheap clothes. Mark is given a ride home by Blanco, one of Chuck's close friends. There, he sees his friend Paolo and Paolo's girlfriend Yssa.

Mark opens a rejection letter from the Ateneo while discussing financial difficulties with his mother over the phone. He watches a video of Chuck and Janine drinking together as his data plan expires. During dress rehearsals, Janine recalls a time when she nearly developed stage fright following a prop malfunction, reminding Mark to choose his fate. Blanco and Paolo introduce Mark to Uy, another classmate who was humiliated by Chuck. They invite Mark to the bar and discuss their plan to kidnap Chuck for ransom. They ask Mark to use his house as a safe house to hold him. Uy tells Mark that Chuck's father, Rody, is a drug lord, and that Blanco's father, a police officer, protects him.

At school, Mark receives a text from his aunt demanding rent and tells the group that he will join as long as no one gets hurt. Paolo tells Mark that they plan to kidnap Chuck from a massage parlor. Uy, Blanco, and Paolo get into a fight at school, and Blanco argues with his father over it. Later that night, while waiting outside of the parlor, Blanco asks each member what they plan to do with the money to ease their nerves. Mark answers that he plans to leave Manila and return home to Tacloban. After watching Chuck enter the parlor, they don masks. Blanco retrieves a gun from his glove compartment and reminds them there is no turning back.

They kidnap Chuck and bring him back to Mark's apartment. Using Chuck's phone, Uy pretends to be a Chinese triad in his ransom call to Rody. Blanco yells at Uy as he is the only Chinese student in their class. He instructs the group to post differing stories to create their alibi. Blanco expresses his disdain for his father to Mark over his partnership with Rody, vowing to take them both down.

Mark is promoted to lead actor after Chuck's disappearance. In the dressing room, Uy says that the ransom will be delivered at 2020, a night club. Yssa enters and demands a cut of the ransom in exchange for her silence. Paolo tells them that he told Yssa they are extorting Chuck after she confronts him for being at the parlor. They return to Mark's apartment and find that Chuck managed to remove the restraints on his legs. After a brief fight that injures Uy's leg, they knock him out. Afterward, Rody calls to confirm the drop-off, and the group asks Yssa to take Uy's place.

Rody drops a bag containing the money in the middle of the dance floor, and Blanco sees his father with Rody's associates. Yssa gets into a fight with another girl who tries to claim the bag. Blanco's father heads over to the commotion, but Paolo distracts them. Yssa is confronted by Rody outside of the club and is held at gunpoint. Blanco, Paolo, and Mark confront Rody, and Blanco shoots Rody to death. Yssa demands to know what happens to Chuck and storms off. Blanco reveals to Mark that the kidnapping was a ploy to get to Rody. The group retrieves Chuck and drops him off at a remote village.

During the play, Janine reveals to Mark that she wasn't accepted into UP. Onstage, Paolo and Mark watch as police chase after Uy. Paolo and Uy are arrested while Mark and Blanco run from the police. They are cornered, and Mark is killed after pulling a gun out. Police take Blanco to his father, where he cries in his father's arms. Two weeks later, the school play is met with a standing ovation. As everyone celebrates, Janine begins crying.

== Cast ==
- Kelvin Miranda as Mark Santa Maria
- Vance Larena as Charles Blanco
- Khalil Ramos as Paolo Gabriel
- Jan Silverio as Gideon Uy
- Sue Ramirez as Janina Camiloza
- Markus Paterson as Chuck Santos
- Gabby Padilla as Yssa Miranda
- Ku Aquino as Uncle Rody
- Allan Villafuerte as Manolo
- Rowena Concepcion as Auntie Bebe
- Emmanuel Dela Cruz as Theater Teacher
- Juan Pablo Pineda III as Moses
- Jude Matthew Servilla as Peter

== Release ==
Dead Kids premiered on the closing ceremony of the 2019 Cinema One Originals Film Festival. It was released on December 1, 2019, on streaming site Netflix.

== Reception ==
=== Critical reception ===
Dead Kids received negative reviews from critics. On the review aggregator website Rotten Tomatoes, 17% of 6 critics' reviews are positive, with an average rating of 5.7/10.

Panos Kotzathanasis from Asian Movie Pulse praised the premise, themes, visuals, and Lorena's performance, but criticized Red's execution, stating, "The already thin balance among those elements is quickly lost, and the narrative becomes something that does not seem to lead anywhere, in essence toning down all the comments Red wanted to make." John Serba for Decider also praises similar elements, but concludes that the poor writing and soundtrack "fails to balance and blend its glib and serious tones."

Fred Hawson of ABS-CBN News said “The suspense and tension of the final outcome will keep viewers hanging on to the very end.” He also praised the acting, though he criticized Sue Ramirez’ character as “largely sidelined and undeveloped.“ Jocelyn Valle of Philippine Entertainment Portal praised the cast and said that the film is a worthy addition to your “My List” in Netflix.
