= Unica Hija =

Philippine television drama series

- Title card
- Genre: Science fiction drama
- Written by: Reggie Amigo; Glaiza Ramirez; Patrick Ilagan
- Directed by: Mark Sicat dela Cruz
- Creative director: Aloy Adlawan
- Starring: Kate Valdez
- Theme music composer: Natasha Correos
- Opening theme: "Ikaw ang Aking Daigdig" by Aicelle Santos
- Country of origin: Philippines
- Original language: Tagalog
- No. of episodes: 85

Production
- Executive producer: Mavic Tagbo
- Camera setup: Multiple-camera setup
- Running time: 20–35 minutes
- Production company: GMA Entertainment Group

Original release
- Network: GMA Network
- Release: November 7, 2022 – March 3, 2023

Unica Hija (transl. only daughter) is a Philippine television drama science fiction series broadcast by GMA Network. Directed by Mark Sicat dela Cruz, it stars Kate Valdez in the title role. It premiered on November 7, 2022 on the network's Afternoon Prime line up. The series concluded on March 3, 2023, with a total of 85 episodes.

The series is streaming online on YouTube.

== Cast and characters ==
Cast

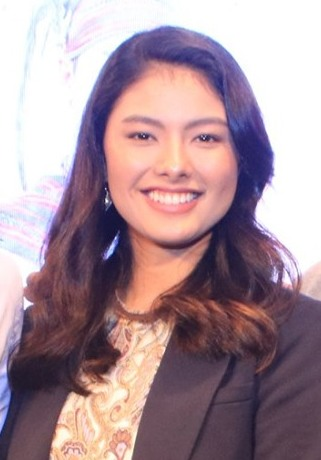
Kate Valdez

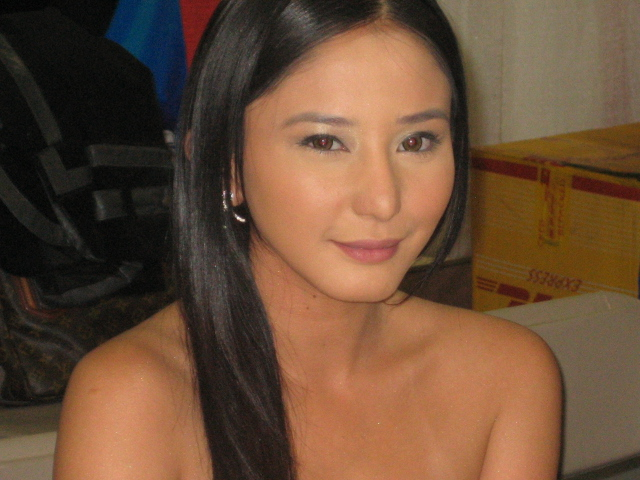
Katrina Halili

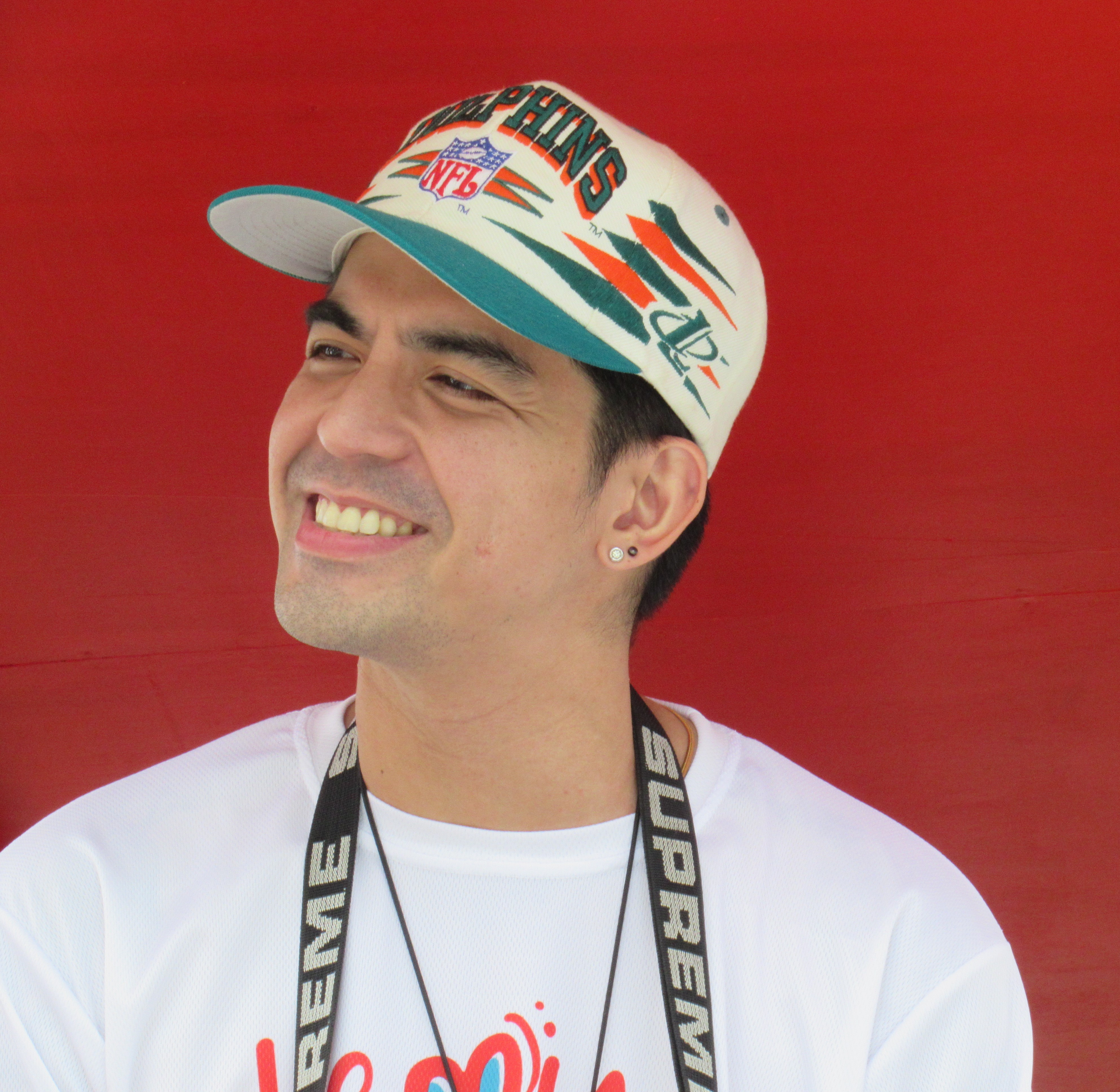
Mark Herras

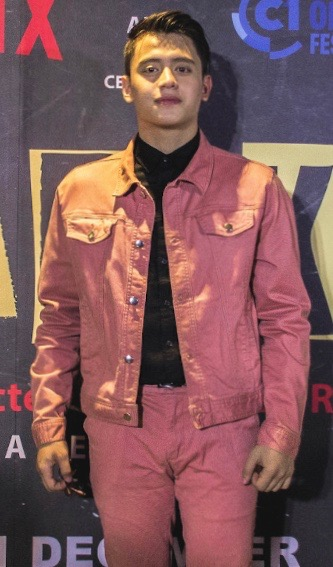
Kelvin Miranda

Lead cast

- Kate Valdez as Bianca "Bubbles" Sebastian / Hope Sebastian / Fatima / Charity / Agape / Roxanne

Supporting cast

- Katrina Halili as Diane "D" Sebastian
- Maybelyn dela Cruz as Cara Orosco-Rivas
- Biboy Ramirez as Joselito "Jhong" Marasigan
- Mark Herras as Zachary "Zach" Rivas
- Boboy Garrovillo as Romualdo "Waldo"
- Bernard Palanca as Lucas Orosco
- Maricar de Mesa as Lorna Marasigan
- Faith Da Silva as Carnation Marasigan / Hope Sebastian
- Athena "Rere" Madrid as Aica O. Rivas
- Kelvin Miranda as Ralph S. Vergara
- Jennie Gabriel as Trixie
- Jemwell Ventenilla as Denver
- Shanicka Arganda as Penny
- Issa Litton as Tamara Saavedra-Vergara
- Erin Ocampo as Elena
- Bing Pimentel as Hera "Mother Hera" Meneses
- Arkel Mendoza as Mickey

Guest cast

- Alfred Vargas as Christian Sebastian
- Lilet as Melinda Rivas
- Kzhoebe Nichole Baker as younger Carnation Marasigan
- Lyanne Bron as younger Hope Marasigan / Hope Sebastian
- Therese Malvar as younger Cara Orosco
- Kych Minemoto as younger Zachary Rivas
- Shermaine Santiago as Gracia "G" Garcia
- Patricia Tumulak as a TV host
- Aaron Hewson as Vladimir

== Production ==
Principal photography commenced on July 20, 2022.

== Ratings ==
According to AGB Nielsen Philippines' Nationwide Urban Television Audience Measurement People in television homes, the pilot episode of Unica Hija earned a 7.2% rating. The final episode scored an 8.9% rating.

== Accolades ==
Accolades received by Unica Hija
Year	Award	Category	Recipient	Result	Ref.
2024	5th VP Choice Awards	TV Series of the Year (Afternoon)	Unica Hija	Nominated	
2024	5th VP Choice Awards	TV Actor of the Year (Afternoon)	Kelvin Miranda	Nominated	
2024	5th VP Choice Awards	TV Actress of the Year (Afternoon)	Kate Valdez	Nominated	
