= Everyone Knows Every Juan =

2025 Philippine dark comedy drama film

- Official movie poster
- Directed by: Alessandra de Rossi
- Written by: Carlo Enciso Catu
- Produced by: Alessandra de Rossi; Vic del Rosario
- Starring: Alessandra de Rossi; Edu Manzano; Gina Alajar; Joel Torre; Ruby Ruiz; Ronnie Lazaro; JM de Guzman
- Production companies: Viva Films; A World Of Our Own
- Distributed by: Viva Films (Philippines); Netflix
- Release date: October 22, 2025 (Philippines)
- Country: Philippines
- Language: Tagalog

Everyone Knows Every Juan is a 2025 Philippine dark comedy drama film directed by Alessandra de Rossi. The screenplay was written by Carlo Enciso Catu. The cast includes De Rossi, Edu Manzano, Gina Alajar, Joel Torre, Ruby Ruiz, Ronnie Lazaro, and JM de Guzman. The plot focuses on a family reunion held one year after the mother's death.

The filmmakers shot the movie using a single continuous take technique. It was released in Philippine cinemas on October 22, 2025.

== Plot ==
A year after the death of their mother Juaning (Liza Lorena), the Sevilla siblings reunite at their ancestral home. The gathering, intended as a memorial, quickly descends into conflict as old resentments and hidden struggles resurface. Tupe (Edu Manzano), the eldest, is a cosmetic surgeon who masks his insecurities with pride. Josie (Ruby Ruiz) arrives burdened by debt, while Rose (Gina Alajar), a corporate executive, provokes outrage by ordering an autopsy on their mother’s remains. Ramil (Ronnie Lazaro), a laid-back drifter, attempts to avoid the disputes, and Roel (Joel Torre), a former rock star, battles alcoholism. The youngest sibling, Raquel (Alessandra de Rossi), sharp-witted but weary, sacrificed her own ambitions to care for their mother and now seeks her place within the fractured family.

The reunion is further complicated by outsiders. Anna (Angeli Bayani), Juaning’s caretaker, harbors secrets from the past; Jacob (Kelvin Miranda), the gardener, asserts ownership of the ancestral home; and Alfred (JM de Guzman), Raquel’s partner, sides with Jacob, deepening the divide. What begins as a commemoration evolves into a chaotic reckoning, forcing the Sevilla family to confront their mother’s legacy and the truths they have long concealed.

== Cast ==
- Alessandra de Rossi as Miraquel ”Raquel” Sevilla, the youngest sibling.
- Edu Manzano as Tupe Sevilla, a cosmetic surgeon.
- Gina Alajar as Rosalinda ”Rose” Sevilla, a corporate professional running for councilor.
- Joel Torre as Roel Sevilla, a musician.
- Ruby Ruiz as Josie Sevilla, the second eldest sibling.
- Ronnie Lazaro as Ramil Sevilla, a construction worker.
- Liza Lorena as Juaning Sevilla, the mother.
- Kelvin Miranda as Jacob Bukal, the gardener.
- JM de Guzman as Alfred, Raquel's live-in partner.
- Angeli Bayani as Anna, the former caretaker.
- Jaime Fabregas as Father Johnny
- Angel Aquino as Victoria
- Empoy Marquez as Brother Felix
- Jerald Napoles as Vince
- Kim Molina as Isay
- Atasha Muhlach as Alice

== Production ==
=== Development ===
This is the second film directed by Alessandra de Rossi. Her first was My Amanda in 2021. De Rossi also produced the film. She planned to enter the film in the Metro Manila Film Festival, but Vic del Rosario decided to release it separately.

=== Filming ===
The director used a continuous take format for the film. Rico Gutierrez worked as the technical director. The crew used theater actors to test the camera movements and blocking before the main cast arrived.

The cast rehearsed for two days. Filming took two days to complete. De Rossi stated that they used two takes in total. This was necessary to show a change from day to night.

== Release ==
The film premiered at SM North EDSA on October 20, 2025. It opened in Philippine theaters on October 22, 2025.

Netflix released the film for streaming on February 5, 2026.

== Reception ==
Fred Hawson of ABS-CBN News wrote that the film was an "ambitious undertaking." He noted that while the acting was good, there were technical issues with the camera and lighting.

Gina Alajar stated that she was initially concerned about the project because of the short shooting schedule. The Manila Bulletin wrote that Kelvin Miranda was a "quiet force" in his role as the gardener.

The film reached the number one position on the Netflix Philippines Top 10 Movies list in February 2026.
