= Stories from the Heart =

Philippine television drama series

- Title card
- Genre: Romantic drama
- Country of origin: Philippines
- Original language: Tagalog
- No. of episodes: 85

Production
- Camera setup: Multiple-camera setup
- Running time: 21–27 minutes
- Production company: GMA Entertainment Group

Original release
- Network: GMA Network
- Release: September 13, 2021 – January 7, 2022

Stories from the Heart is a Philippine television drama romance anthology series broadcast by GMA Network. It premiered on September 13, 2021 on the network's Afternoon Prime line up. The series concluded on January 7, 2022, with a total of 85 episodes.

The series is streaming online on YouTube.

== Cast and characters ==
Cast

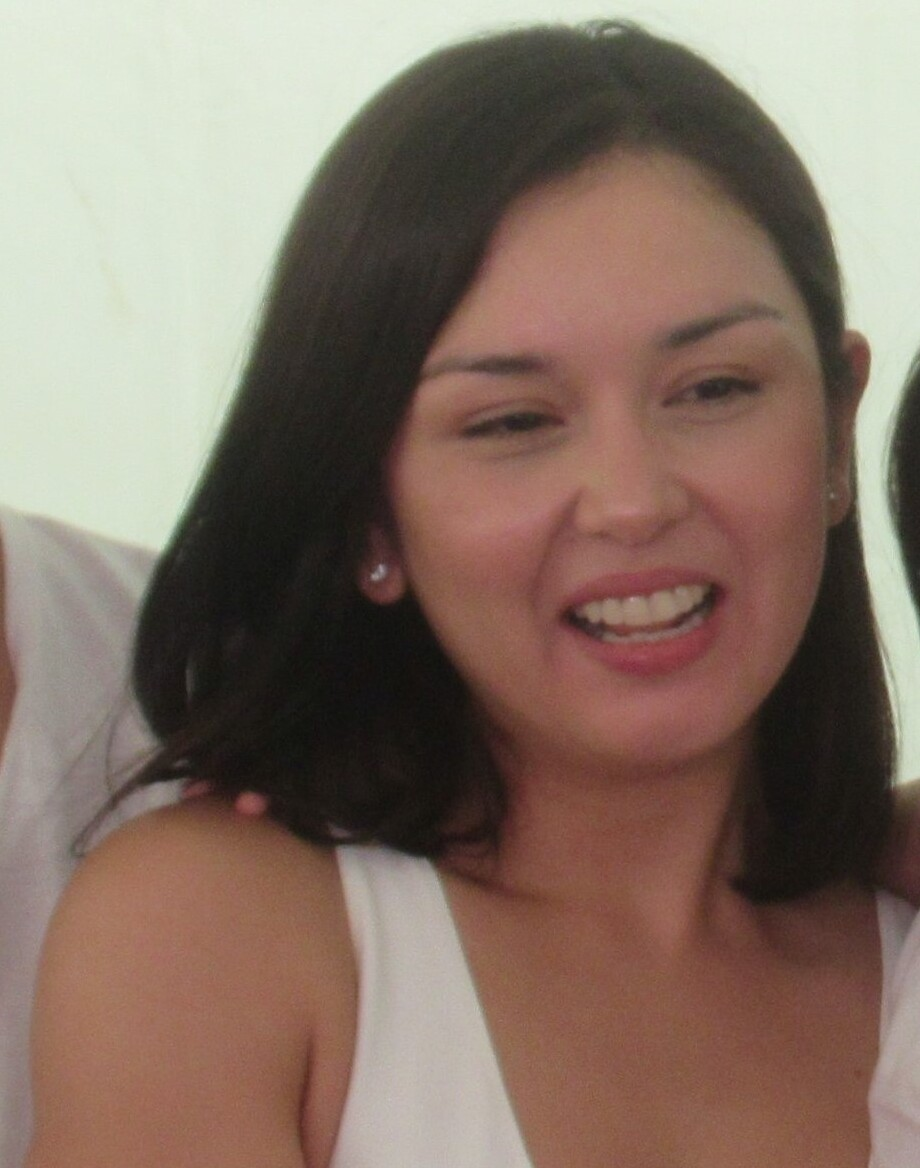
Beauty Gonzalez

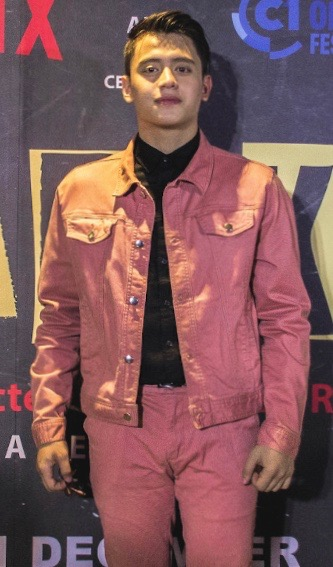
Kelvin Miranda

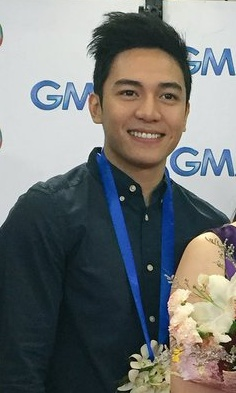
Jak Roberto

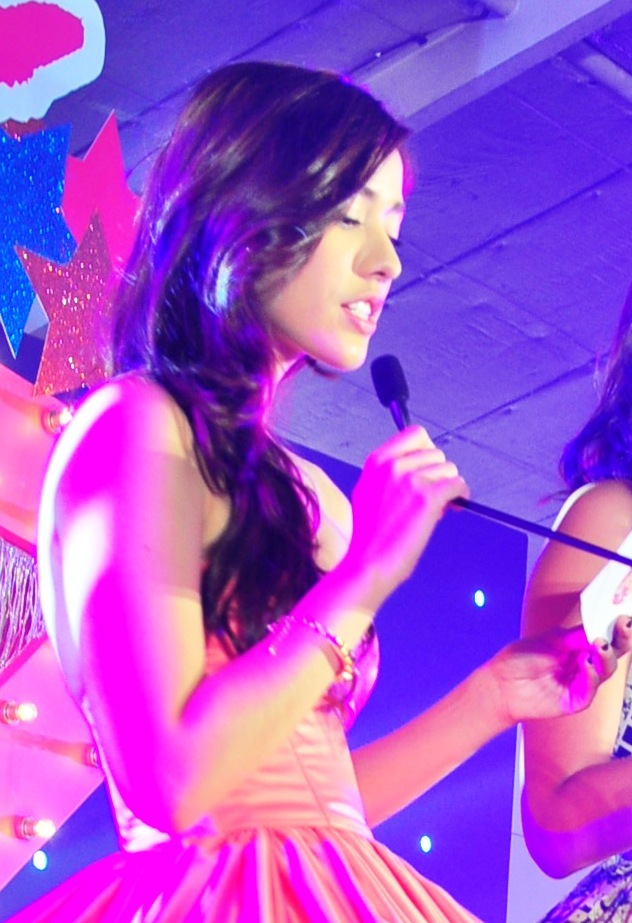
Lauren Young

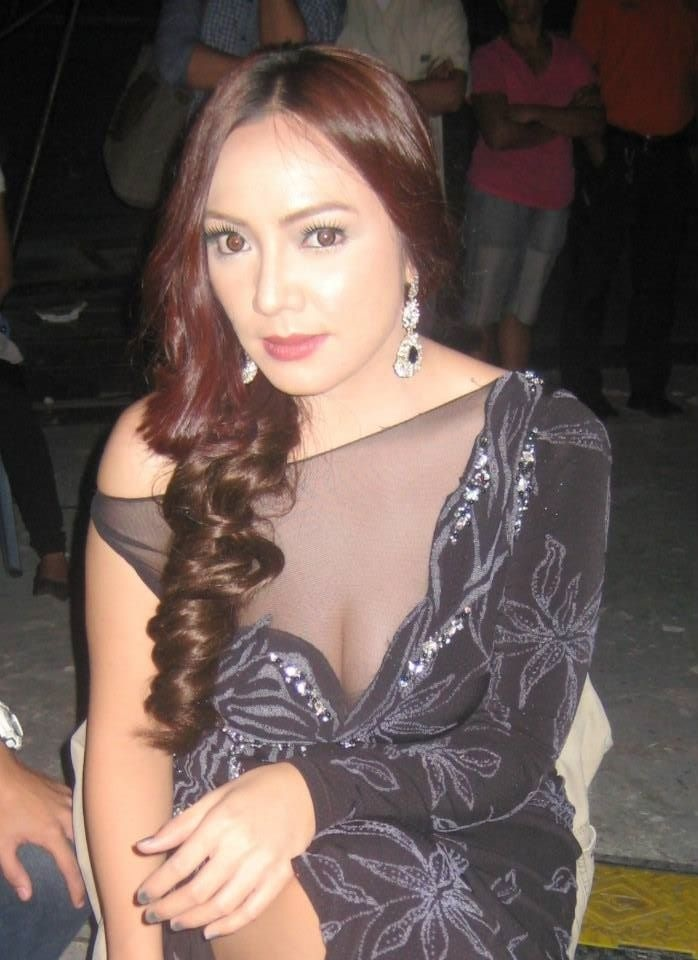
Shermaine Santiago

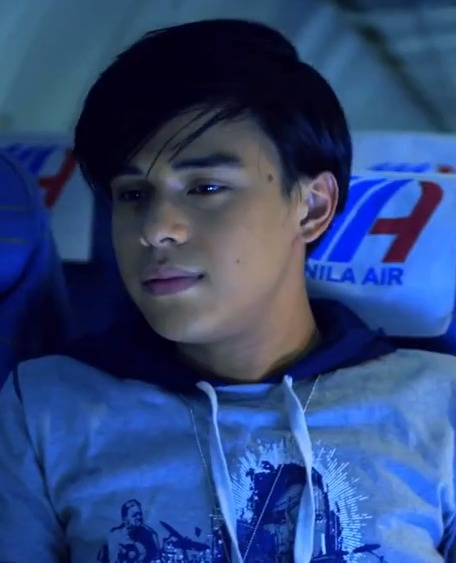
Khalil Ramos

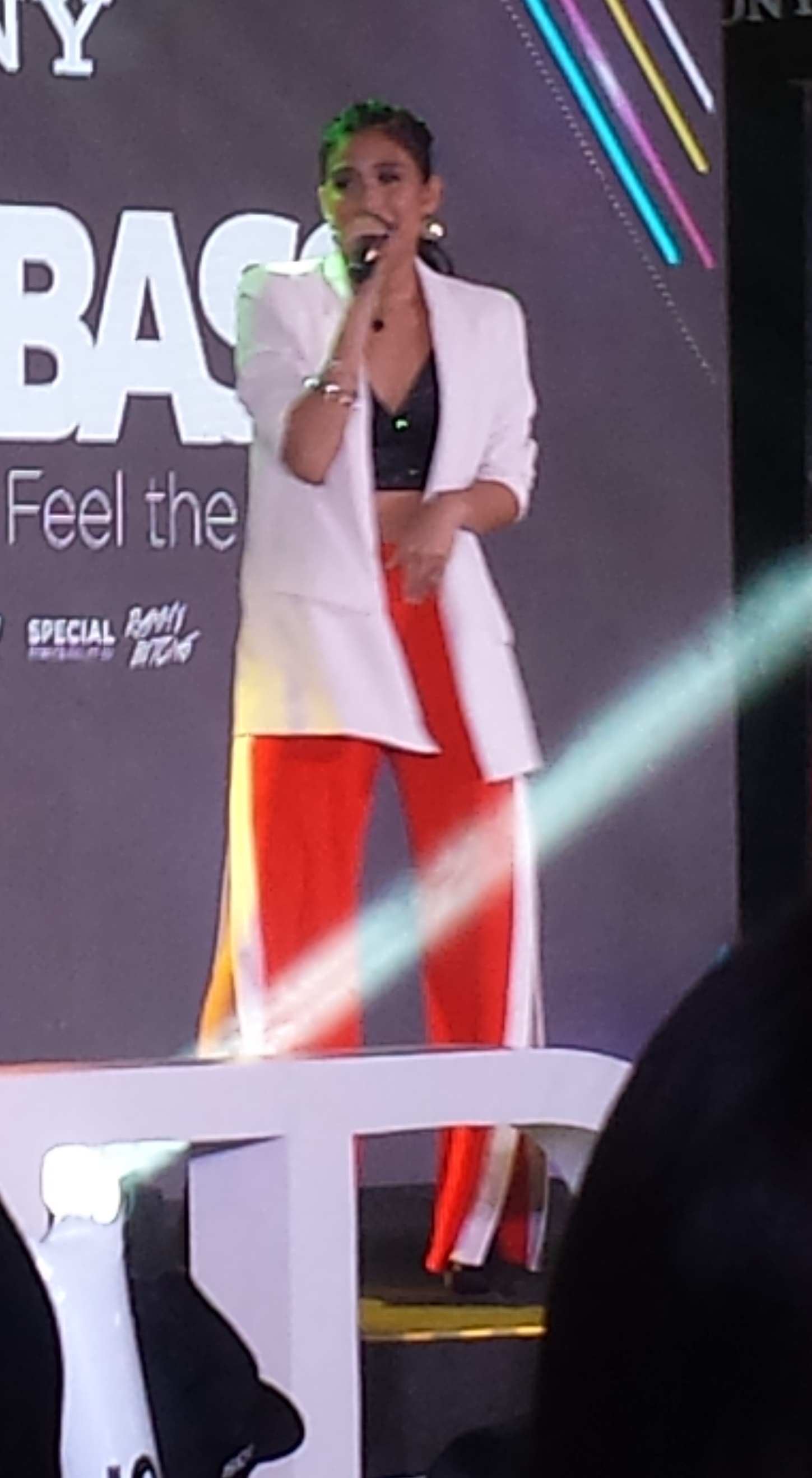
Gabbi Garcia

Loving Miss Bridgette

- Beauty Gonzalez as Bridgette "Bridge" de Leon
- Kelvin Miranda as Marcus M. Villareal
- Bing Loyzaga as Stella Morales-Villareal
- Lloyd Samartino as Manolo Villareal
- Adrian Alandy as Luther Tamayo
- Polo Ravales as Tristan Enriquez
- Tart Carlos as Elsa Manalo
- Pamela Prinster as Abegail "Abby" Mendoza
- Nikki Co as Waxee Galang
- Shanicka Arganda as Nina Torrente
- Julie Lee as Miriam Solano
- Noel Colet as Samuel Solano

Never Say Goodbye

- Klea Pineda as Joyce Kintanar
- Jak Roberto as Bruce Pelaez
- Lauren Young as Victoria Flores-Pelaez
- Snooky Serna as Susan Kintanar
- Max Eigenmann as Jackilyn "Jack" Kintanar
- Kim Rodriguez as Lily Pelaez
- Shermaine Santiago as Darla Delos Reyes
- Mosang as Corazon "Nay Cora" Santos
- Herlene Budol as Alana Santos
- Luke Conde as Edwin Cabrera
- Phytos Ramirez as Joshua Quinto
- Art Acuna as Bernard Flores

Love on Air

- Khalil Ramos as Joseph Garcia / DJ Jojo
- Gabbi Garcia as Wanda Dimaano / Miss Wonderful
- Kate Valdez as Joana "Joan" Sevilla
- Yasser Marta as Ignacio Boy Logronio / Nacho Bautista / Iggy Boy
- Kiray Celis as Meanne Rivera
- Jason Francisco as Rommel Montella
- Anjo Damiles as Vincent Rivera
- Psalms David as Zimba Dimaano
- Sunshine Cruz as Deborah Gutierrez

The End of Us

- Carmina Villarroel as Maggie Corpuz
- Zoren Legaspi as Jeffrey Guevara
- Ariella Arida as Eunice Uytengco
- Johnny Revilla as Hermes Concepcion
- Karel Marquez as Wendy Corpuz
- Andrew Gan as Javier Uytengco

== Episodes ==
=== Loving Miss Bridgette ===
Episodes of Loving Miss Bridgette
No. overall	No. in season	Title	Directed by	Original release date
1	1	"Premiere"	Adolf Alix Jr.	September 13, 2021
2	2	"The Encounter"	Adolf Alix Jr.	September 14, 2021
3	3	"Past is Past"	Adolf Alix Jr.	September 15, 2021
4	4	"Counselling Sessions"	Adolf Alix Jr.	September 16, 2021
5	5	"The Kiss"	Adolf Alix Jr.	September 17, 2021
6	6	"Confused Heart"	Adolf Alix Jr.	September 20, 2021
7	7	"Drunk in Love"	Adolf Alix Jr.	September 21, 2021
8	8	"To the Rescue"	Adolf Alix Jr.	September 22, 2021
9	9	"The Real Score"	Adolf Alix Jr.	September 23, 2021
10	10	"Bistado" (transl. caught)	Adolf Alix Jr.	September 24, 2021
11	11	"Salo" (transl. eating)	Adolf Alix Jr.	September 27, 2021
12	12	"Jealousy"	Adolf Alix Jr.	September 28, 2021
13	13	"Marcus vs. Luther"	Adolf Alix Jr.	September 29, 2021
14	14	"Cause and Effect"	Adolf Alix Jr.	September 30, 2021
15	15	"Campus Cam"	Adolf Alix Jr.	October 1, 2021
16	16	"The Deal"	Adolf Alix Jr.	October 4, 2021
17	17	"Spill the Tea"	Adolf Alix Jr.	October 5, 2021
18	18	"Truth Be Told"	Adolf Alix Jr.	October 6, 2021
19	19	"Counselor No More"	Adolf Alix Jr.	October 7, 2021
20	20	"Bridge is Falling Down"	Adolf Alix Jr.	October 8, 2021
21	21	"Agreement"	Adolf Alix Jr.	October 11, 2021
22	22	"Take Over"	Adolf Alix Jr.	October 12, 2021
23	23	"Where is Marcus?"	Adolf Alix Jr.	October 13, 2021
24	24	"This is the End"	Adolf Alix Jr.	October 14, 2021
25	25	"Closure"	Adolf Alix Jr.	October 15, 2021

=== Never Say Goodbye ===
Episodes of Never Say Goodbye
No. overall	No. in season	Title	Directed by	Original release date	AGB Nielsen Ratings NUTAM People
26	1	"Premiere"	Paul Sta. Ana	October 18, 2021	6.7%
27	2	"Our Vow"	Paul Sta. Ana	October 19, 2021	
28	3	"Our Breakup"	Paul Sta. Ana	October 20, 2021	8.1%
29	4	"Dream House"	Paul Sta. Ana	October 21, 2021	
30	5	"Our Reunion"	Paul Sta. Ana	October 22, 2021	
31	6	"The Diagnosis"	Paul Sta. Ana	October 25, 2021	6.8%
32	7	"Our Longing"	Paul Sta. Ana	October 26, 2021	6.2%
33	8	"Pains of the Past"	Paul Sta. Ana	October 27, 2021	6.2%
34	9	"Unspoken Truth"	Paul Sta. Ana	October 28, 2021	6.2%
35	10	"The Decision"	Paul Sta. Ana	October 29, 2021	
36	11	"Eulogy"	Paul Sta. Ana	November 1, 2021	
37	12	"Mastectomy"	Paul Sta. Ana	November 2, 2021	
38	13	"Beyond the Sacrifice"	Paul Sta. Ana	November 3, 2021	
39	14	"Where the Truth Lies"	Paul Sta. Ana	November 4, 2021	
40	15	"Bucket List"	Paul Sta. Ana	November 5, 2021	
41	16	"Our Kiss"	Paul Sta. Ana	November 8, 2021	
42	17	"Secrets Unfold"	Paul Sta. Ana	November 9, 2021	
43	18	"Shattered Hearts"	Paul Sta. Ana	November 10, 2021	
44	19	"The Ex or the Wife"	Paul Sta. Ana	November 11, 2021	
45	20	"Closer to Goodbye"	Paul Sta. Ana	November 12, 2021	
46	21	"Surrender"	Paul Sta. Ana	November 15, 2021	
47	22	"The Borrowed Husband"	Paul Sta. Ana	November 16, 2021	
48	23	"To Love or to Let Go"	Paul Sta. Ana	November 17, 2021	
49	24	"Countdown"	Paul Sta. Ana	November 18, 2021	
50	25	"Final Gatherings"	Paul Sta. Ana	November 19, 2021	
51	26	"High Hopes"	Paul Sta. Ana	November 22, 2021	
52	27	"What's Yours is Mine"	Paul Sta. Ana	November 23, 2021	
53	28	"Paper Planes"	Paul Sta. Ana	November 24, 2021	
54	29	"Redemption"	Paul Sta. Ana	November 25, 2021	
55	30	"Finale"	Paul Sta. Ana	November 26, 2021	

=== Love on Air ===
Episodes of Love on Air
No. overall	No. in season	Title	Directed by	Original release date	AGB Nielsen Ratings NUTAM People
56	1	"Now Airing"	Paul Sta. Ana	November 29, 2021	5.1%
57	2	"Sharing Passwords"	Paul Sta. Ana	November 30, 2021	4.7%
58	3	"Plan B"	Paul Sta. Ana	December 1, 2021	5.1%
59	4	"Sweet Escape"	Paul Sta. Ana	December 2, 2021	4.6%
60	5	"Job Offer"	Paul Sta. Ana	December 3, 2021	5.1%
61	6	"Surprise Surprise"	Paul Sta. Ana	December 6, 2021	
62	7	"Cat and Dog"	Paul Sta. Ana	December 7, 2021	
63	8	"Team JoWa"	Paul Sta. Ana	December 8, 2021	5.0%
64	9	"Gandang Wanda" (transl. beautiful Wanda)	Paul Sta. Ana	December 9, 2021	5.0%
65	10	"Special Friend"	Paul Sta. Ana	December 10, 2021	5.0%
66	11	"The Kiss"	Paul Sta. Ana	December 13, 2021	4.8%
67	12	"Jealous Jojo"	Paul Sta. Ana	December 14, 2021	5.4%
68	13	"Breaking JoWa"	Paul Sta. Ana	December 15, 2021	5.4%
69	14	"Fake Partners"	Paul Sta. Ana	December 16, 2021	
70	15	"Partners for Life"	Paul Sta. Ana	December 17, 2021	

=== The End of Us ===
Episodes of The End of Us
No. overall	No. in season	Title	Directed by	Original release date
71	1	"World Premiere"	Zig Dulay	December 20, 2021
72	2	"Reminiscing"	Zig Dulay	December 21, 2021
73	3	"The Affair"	Zig Dulay	December 22, 2021
74	4	"Hurting Individuals"	Zig Dulay	December 23, 2021
75	5	"Annulment is Coming to Town"	Zig Dulay	December 24, 2021
76	6	"Defenses Up"	Zig Dulay	December 27, 2021
77	7	"Money Can't Buy Class"	Zig Dulay	December 28, 2021
78	8	"Terrorized"	Zig Dulay	December 29, 2021
79	9	"Trust and Betrayal"	Zig Dulay	December 30, 2021
80	10	"Trust and Betrayal"	Zig Dulay	December 31, 2021
81	11	"Tired Hearts"	Zig Dulay	January 3, 2022
82	12	"The Meltdown"	Zig Dulay	January 4, 2022
83	13	"Birdhouse"	Zig Dulay	January 5, 2022
84	14	"The Wife Becomes a Mistress"	Zig Dulay	January 6, 2022
85	15	"Finale"	Zig Dulay	January 7, 2022

== Production ==
Principal photography for Never Say Goodbye commenced in June 2021. Filming for Loving Miss Bridgette began on July 21, 2021 on Tanay, Rizal.
