= Benedict Cua =

Filipino YouTuber and content creator

- Born: June 11, 1992 (age 34)
- Citizenship: Chinese-Filipino
- Occupations: YouTuber; Content creator
- Years active: 2018–present
- Children: 1

Benedict Cua is a Filipino YouTuber and content creator. He uploads lifestyle, food, and family-related videos on his self-titled YouTube channel.

== Career ==
In 2018, Cua started uploading to YouTube on a weekly basis. One of his first videos was named "MY AWKWARD FIRST VLOG.". He upload vlogs regarding daily routines,food, and various lifestyle, and topic based video.

He has also appeared in television, including work connected with the series Anak Ni Waray Vs. Anak Ni Biday, and has released music.

== Personal life ==
Cua has spoken of helping his family sell products throughout his childhood, working in corporate positions before turning to internet content. He said he had a child by February 2024, with his son referred to as Aleck (Baobao). He stated he was a single father in more recent videos.
