= Kate Valdez =

Filipino actress (born 2000)

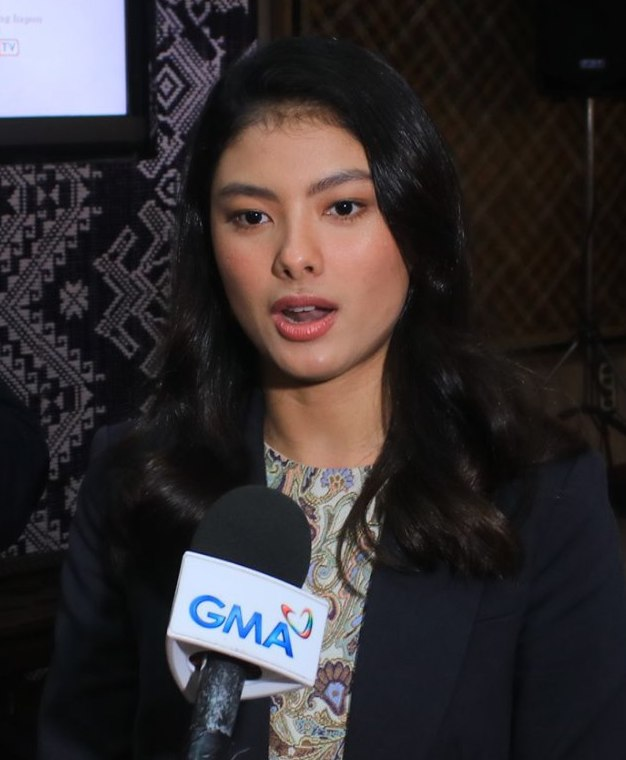
- Valdez in 2020
- Born: Keith Eliana Habala Sisante; August 21, 2000 (age 26); Trece Martires, Cavite, Philippines
- Occupations: Actress; singer; songwriter; content creator
- Years active: 2015–present
- Agent: Sparkle (2015–present)

Keith Eliana Habala Sisante (born August 21, 2000), professionally known as Kate Valdez (Tagalog pronunciation: [bɐlˈdɛs]), is a Filipino actress, singer, songwriter, and content creator. She is known for her role as Violet in Destiny Rose (2015), as Mira in Encantadia (2016), as Natalie / Rosemarie in Onanay (2018), as Caitlyn in Anak ni Waray vs. Anak ni Biday (2020), Bianca / Hope in Unica Hija (2022), and as Inna in Shining Inheritance (2024).

In September 2024, Valdez launched a joint TikTok page with her boyfriend, Fumiya Sankai, called Onigiri Lovers. The couple also posts vlogs on YouTube, under the same name.

== Early life and education ==
Kate Valdez was born as Keith Eliana Habala Sisante in Trece Martires, Cavite, to Edmond and Teresita Habala-Sisante. Valdez was enrolled at Miriam College.

== Career ==
=== Acting ===
In 2015, Valdez signed a contract with GMA Artist Center. Valdez later appeared on Destiny Rose as Violet Vitto Jacobs.

In 2016, Valdez became a part the 2016 requel-sequel of Encantadia as Mira, originally portrayed by Yasmien Kurdi. The character is the daughter of Pirena, played by Glaiza de Castro, and was originally portrayed by Sunshine Dizon in the original series. In 2025, she reprised the role in the spin-off Encantadia Chronicles: Sang'gre.

In 2018, Valdez portrayed the villainous and arrogant Natalie in Onanay. She also appeared as the protagonist villain in Anak ni Waray vs. Anak ni Biday as Caitlyn, the envious and vindictive daughter of Sussie.

In late 2022, she started playing a protagonist dual-role, Hope Marasigan who is a "clone" of Bianca Sebastian in the high-rating sci-fi drama, Unica Hija.

In 2023, Variety announced that an adaptation of the American comic book series Dreamwalker by Mikey Sutton was greenlit by 108 Media, a studio based in London and Singapore. The report confirmed that Valdez, who provided the visual inspiration for the Filipino-American protagonist Kat in the comics, would play the lead role. Mikhail Red was attached to direct.

In 2024, Valdez portrayed the main protagonist role, Inna Villarazon in Shining Inheritance.

== Personal life ==
Valdez dated Japanese vlogger Fumiya Sankai. The pair broke up in 2026.

== Filmography ==
=== Film ===
Year	Film	Role
2019	Black Lipstick	Chloe Marie Imperial

=== Television ===
Year	Program	Role
2015–2016	Destiny Rose	Violet Vitto Jacobs
2016–2017	Encantadia	Sang'gre Mira / "Lira"
2016	Karelasyon: Nagmumurang Kamatis	Madel
2016	Maynila	Nikki
2016	Magpakailanman: Finding Earl: The Dollente Family Story	Patty
2017	Dear Uge: Remedyo Noche	Trisha
2017	Dear Uge: Pinulot Ka Lang sa Gluta	Tisay
2017	Magpakailanman: Pinay in the Happiest Place on Earth	Isabella
2017	Daig Kayo ng Lola Ko: Echoserang Senyorita at ang Pabibong Frog	Senyorita Angelica
2017	Maynila	Aileen
2017	Wish Ko Lang: Sa Kuweba Ng Buhay	Joanne
2017	Road Trip	Herself
2018	Sherlock Jr.	Jenny Nuñez
2018	Dear Uge: Mommy's Home	Giselle
2018	Lip Sync Battle Philippines	Herself
2018–2019	Onanay	Rosemary / Natalie "Nat" Montenegro
2018–2019	Studio 7	Herself
2019	Sahaya	Kira
2020–2021	Anak ni Waray vs. Anak ni Biday	Caitlyn Malatamban-Escoto
2020	All Out Sundays	Herself
2020	Daig Kayo Ng Lola Ko: Witch is Which	Lily
2020	Project Destination	Loret
2021	Magpakailanman: My Stalker Girlfriend	Cristine
2021	Heartful Café	Diana
2021	Pepito Manaloto: Ang Unang Kuwento	Judy
2021	Stories from the Heart: Love on Air	Joana "Joan" Sevilla
2021	Dear Uge: Minanikang Maniken	Monica
2022	Regal Studio Presents: Exs Marks The Heart	Andrea "Andi" Rivera
2022	Regal Studio Presents: Open Minded	Mona
2022	Daig Kayo Ng Lola Ko: Billie Bili Na	Belinda Marie "Billie"
2022	TOLS	Geneva Ochoa
2022–2023	Unica Hija	Bianca Sebastian / Hope Marasigan / Fatima / Charity / Agape / Joy / Grace
2023	Regal Studio Presents: Holdap 'To, I Love You	Marian
2023	Walang Matigas na Pulis sa Matinik na Misis	Sheena Riego De Dios
2024–2025	Shining Inheritance	Martina "Inna" R. Villarazon
2024	It's Showtime	Herself
2025–2026	Encantadia Chronicles: Sang'gre	Sang'gre Mira
