= List of Destiny Rose episodes =

Destiny Rose is a 2015 Philippine television drama series broadcast by GMA Network. It premiered on the network's Afternoon Prime line up and worldwide on GMA Pinoy TV from September 14, 2015 to March 11, 2016 replacing Healing Hearts.

Mega Manila ratings are provided by AGB Nielsen Philippines.

== Series overview ==
Month	Episodes	Monthly Averages
Month	Episodes	Mega Manila
September 2015	13	13.9%
October 2015	22	16.0%
November 2015	21	17.4%
December 2015	23	15.4%
January 2016	21	13.8%
February 2016	21	13.4%
March 2016	9	14.4%
Total	130	14.9%

== Episodes ==
=== September 2015 ===
Episode		Original air date	Social Media Hashtag	AGB Nielsen Mega Manila Households in Television Homes			Ref.
Episode		Original air date	Social Media Hashtag	Rating	Timeslot Rank	Daytime Rank	Ref.
1	Pilot	September 14, 2015	#DestinyRose	14.8%	#1	#4	
2	Huli Ka, Joey!	September 15, 2015	#DRHuliKaJoey	14.7%	#1	#5	
3	Pagtakas	September 16, 2015	#DRPagtakas	14.7%	#1	#5	
4	Grown Up Joey	September 17, 2015	#DRGrownUpJoey	13.6%	#1	#5	
5	Inggit si Jasmine	September 18, 2015	#DRInggitSiJasmine	13.6%	#1	#5	
6	Bagyo	September 21, 2015	#DRBagyo	14.2%	#1	#5	
7	Inspirasyon	September 22, 2015	#DRInspirasyon	14.9%	#1	#6	
8	Guapo Gabriele	September 23, 2015	#DRGuapoGabriele	14.1%	#1	#6	
9	Pagpapanggap	September 24, 2015	#DRPagpapanggap	12.4%	#1	#6	
10	Unang Paghaharap	September 25, 2015	#DRUnangPaghaharap	11.8%	#1	#8	
11	Hurting Inside	September 28, 2015	#DRHurtingInside	13.6%	#1	#6	
12	Banta ni Jasmine	September 29, 2015	#DRBantaNiJasmine	13.6%	#1	#6	
13	Sorry Na, Gabriele!	September 30, 2015	#DRSorryNaGabriele	14.3%	#1	#7	

=== October 2015 ===
Episode		Original air date	Social Media Hashtag	AGB Nielsen Mega Manila Households in Television Homes			Ref.
Episode		Original air date	Social Media Hashtag	Rating	Timeslot Rank	Daytime Rank	Ref.
14	Buhos Pa Ulan	October 1, 2015	#DRBuhosPaUlan	15.8%	#1	#6	
15	Paninira ni Jasmine	October 2, 2015	#DRPaniniraNiJasmine	14.4%	#1	#8	
16	Confrontation	October 5, 2015	#DRConfrontation	13.0%	#1	#6	
17	Stolen Letter	October 6, 2015	#DRStolenLetter	12.1%	#1	#8	
18	Blackmail	October 7, 2015	#DRBlackmail	13.7%	#1	#6	
19	For The Truth	October 8, 2015	#DRForTheTruth	14.1%	#1	#7	
20	Torture	October 9, 2015	#DRTorture	15.5%	#1	#4	
21	Finding Joey	October 12, 2015	#DRFindingJoey	15.9%	#1	#5	
22	Agaw Buhay	October 13, 2015	#DRAgawBuhay	17.4%	#1	#3	
23	Rescue	October 14, 2015	#DRRescue	17.4%	#1	#4	
24	Takot	October 15, 2015	#DRTakot	18.3%	#1	#3	
25	Bagong Mundo	October 16, 2015	#DRBagongMundo	18.6%	#1	#3	
26	Mag-ama	October 19, 2015	#DRMagAma	19.1%	#1	#3	
27	Pinagtagpo	October 20, 2015	#DRPinagtagpo	17.3%	#1	#5	
28	Reunion	October 21, 2015	#DRReunion	17.5%	#1	#4	
29	Mag-ina	October 22, 2015	#DRMagIna	15.7%	#1	#5	
30	Joey and Gabriele	October 23, 2015	#DRJoeyAndGabriele	15.8%	#1	#5	
31	Muling Paghaharap	October 26, 2015	#DRMulingPaghaharap	15.2%	#1	#6	
32	Pag-amin	October 27, 2015	#DRPagAmin	15.9%	#1	#5	
33	Bugbog Muli	October 28, 2015	#DRBugbogMuli	15.3%	#1	#5	
34	Helpless	October 29, 2015	#DRHelpless	16.7%	#1	#4	
35	Banta ni Lito	October 30, 2015	#DRBantaNiLito	16.3%	#1	#4	

=== November 2015 ===
Episode		Original air date	Social Media Hashtag	AGB Nielsen Mega Manila Households in Television Homes			Ref.
Episode		Original air date	Social Media Hashtag	Rating	Timeslot Rank	Daytime Rank	Ref.
36	Harsh Lito	November 2, 2015	#DRHarshLito	16.9%	#1	#4	
37	Critical	November 3, 2015	#DRCritical	16.8%	#1	#3	
38	Kabayaran	November 4, 2015	#DRKabayaran	16.7%	#1	#4	
39	Diary	November 5, 2015	#DRDiary	16.5%	#1	#4	
40	Kawawang Joey	November 6, 2015	#DRKawawangJoey	15.8%	#1	#5	
41	Armani is Back	November 9, 2015	#DRArmaniIsBack	18.3%	#1	#3	
42	Viral Love Story	November 10, 2015	#DRViralLoveStory	16.6%	#1	#3	
43	Realization	November 11, 2015	#DRRealization	15.3%	#1	#4	
44	Yes To Change	November 12, 2015	#DRYesToChange	17.0%	#1	#3	
45	Beautiful Transformation	November 13, 2015	#DRBeautifulTransformation	19.1%	#1	#2	
46	Vince Knows	November 16, 2015	#DRVinceKnows	18.8%	#1	#2	
47	Gabriele is a Fan	November 17, 2015	#DRGabrieleIsAFan	18.8%	#1	#3	
48	Disappointed	November 18, 2015	#DRDisappointed	16.8%	#1	#4	
49	Agawan	November 19, 2015	#DRAgawan	18.8%	#1	#2	
50	Joey is Dead	November 20, 2015	#DRJoeyIsDead	19.7%	#1	#2	
51	Charity Ball	November 23, 2015	#DRCharityBall	17.6%	#1	#3	
52	Reunited	November 24, 2015	#DRReunited	18.1%	#1	#2	
53	New Editor in Chief	November 25, 2015	#DRNewEditorInChief	16.8%	#1	#3	
54	Bitter Bethilda	November 26, 2015	#DRBitterBethilda	17.1%	#1	#2	
55	In Danger	November 27, 2015	#DRInDanger	17.0%	#1	#4	
56	Sabotage	November 30, 2015	#DRSabotage	17.6%	#1	#4	

=== December 2015 ===
Episode		Original air date	Social Media Hashtag	AGB Nielsen Mega Manila Households in Television Homes			Ref.
Episode		Original air date	Social Media Hashtag	Rating	Timeslot Rank	Daytime Rank	Ref.
57	Jasmine Declares War	December 1, 2015	#DRJasmineDeclaresWar	18.1%	#1	#3	
58	Team Building	December 2, 2015	#DRTeamBuilding	17.9%	#1	#2	
59	Magkapatid	December 3, 2015	#DRMagkapatid	17.9%	#1	#3	
60	Pag-amin	December 4, 2015	#DRPagAmin	17.8%	#1	#3	
61	Stuck Together	December 7, 2015	#DRStuckTogether	15.8%	#1	#3	
62	Selos Pa More	December 8, 2015	#DRSelosPaMore	15.9%	#1	#4	
63	Hiwalay	December 9, 2015	#DRHiwalay	15.5%	#1	#4	
64	Broken Jasmine	December 10, 2015	#DRBrokenJasmine	15.0%	#1	#4	
65	Paawa	December 11, 2015	#DRPaawa	15.9%	#1	#4	
66	Daisy Meets Destiny	December 14, 2015	#DRDaisyMeetsDestiny	18.5%	#1	#3	
67	Mother Knows	December 15, 2015	#DRMotherKnows	19.7%	#1	#3	
68	Family Reunion	December 16, 2015	#DRFamilyReunion	16.8%	#1	#5	
69	Jasmine's Doubt	December 17, 2015	#DRJasminesDoubt	15.9%	#1	#3	
70	Destiny's Cause	December 18, 2015	#DRDestinysCause	15.8%	#1	#4	
71	Patalbugan	December 21, 2015	#DRPatalbugan	16.3%	#1	#4	
72	Gift Giving	December 22, 2015	#DRGiftGiving	13.2%	#1	#5	
73	Sorpresa	December 23, 2015	#DRSorpresa	13.5%	#1	#5	
74	Painful Memories	December 24, 2015	#DRPainfulMemories	12.2%	#1	#5	
75	Save Destiny	December 25, 2015	#DRSaveDestiny	11.2%	#1	#4	
76	Threat	December 28, 2015	#DRThreat	14.7%	#1	#4	
77	Favorite Place	December 29, 2015	#DRFavoritePlace	12.8%	#1	#5	
78	Kilig Much	December 30, 2015	#DRKiligMuch	12.6%	#1	#4	
79	Lito Helps Destiny	December 31, 2015	#DRLitoHelpsDestiny	11.9%	#1	#4	

=== January 2016 ===
Episode		Original air date	Social Media Hashtag	AGB Nielsen Mega Manila Households in Television Homes			Ref.
Episode		Original air date	Social Media Hashtag	Rating	Timeslot Rank	Daytime Rank	Ref.
80	Jasmine in Jail	January 1, 2016	#DRJasmineInJail	13.1%	#1	#4	
81	Yakap	January 4, 2016	#DRYakap	13.6%	#1	#4	
82	Accidental Kiss	January 5, 2016	#DRAccidentalKiss	13.5%	#1	#4	
83	Jasmine's Drama	January 6, 2016	#DRJasminesDrama	12.9%	#1	#4	
84	Breakup	January 7, 2016	#DRBreakUp	14.9%	#1	#3	
85	Beast Mode Jasmine	January 8, 2016	#DRBeastModeJasmine	14.1%	#1	#4	
86	Lito Knows	January 11, 2016	#DRLitoKnows	14.0%	#1	#4	
87	Flowers For You	January 12, 2016	#DRFlowersForYou	13.6%	#1	#4	
88	Lito Confronts Daisy	January 13, 2016	#DRLitoConfrontsDaisy	14.1%	#1	#4	
89	Angry Lito	January 14, 2016	#DRAngryLito	15.5%	#1	#4	
90	Bistado ni Gabriele	January 15, 2016	#DRBistadoNiGabriele	15.7%	#1	#4	
91	Shout For Love	January 18, 2016	#DRShoutForLove	14.8%	#1	#4	
92	Huli ni Bethilda	January 19, 2016	#DRHuliNiBethilda	12.9%	#1	#4	
93	Paalala ni April	January 20, 2016	#DRPaalalaNiApril	12.8%	#1	#4	
94	Give Up	January 21, 2016	#DRGiveUp	13.6%	#1	#4	
95	Paglisan	January 22, 2016	#DRPaglisan	12.4%	#1	#5	
96	Happy Together	January 25, 2016	#DRHappyTogether	15.5%	#1	#3	
97	Shooting Incident	January 26, 2016	#DRShootingIncident	14.0%	#1	#4	
98	Kulong si Lito	January 27, 2016	#DRKulongSiLito	12.5%	#1	#4	
99	Destiny Defends Lito	January 28, 2016	#DRDestinyDefendsLito	12.5%	#1	#6	
100	Lito in Danger	January 29, 2016	#DRLitoInDanger	13.4%	#1	#4	

=== February 2016 ===
Episode		Original air date	Social Media Hashtag	AGB Nielsen Mega Manila Households in Television Homes			Ref.
Episode		Original air date	Social Media Hashtag	Rating	Timeslot Rank	Daytime Rank	Ref.
101	Search For Lawyer	February 1, 2016	#DRSearchForLawyer	13.7%	#1	#4	
102	Pamamaril	February 2, 2016	#DRPamamaril	13.4%	#1	#3	
103	Hostage	February 3, 2016	#DRHostage	13.9%	#1	#3	
104	Medals	February 4, 2016	#DRMedals	13.4%	#1	#4	
105	Destiny's Problem	February 5, 2016	#DRDestinysProblem	13.9%	#1	#4	
106	The Secret	February 8, 2016	#DRTheSecret	13.3%	#1	#5	
107	Fight For Love	February 9, 2016	#DRFightForLove	12.4%	#1	#5	
108	Goodbye, Diary!	February 10, 2016	#DRGoodbyeDiary	12.6%	#1	#5	
109	Jasmine vs. April	February 11, 2016	#DRJasmineVsApril	13.7%	#1	#4	
110	Mama's Voice	February 12, 2016	#DRMamasVoice	12.6%	#1	#6	
111	Jasmine's Discovery	February 15, 2016	#DRJasminesDiscovery	11.8%	#1	#7	
112	Paghahanda	February 16, 2016	#DRPaghahanda	13.3%	#1	#5	
113	Runaway	February 17, 2016	#DRRunaway	13.3%	#1	#5	
114	Pagbubunyag	February 18, 2016	#DRPagbubunyag	13.0%	#1	#5	
115	Confrontation	February 19, 2016	#DRConfrontation	14.5%	#1	#4	
116	Sorry	February 22, 2016	#DRSorry	14.4%	#1	#4	
117	Unstoppable Jasmine	February 23, 2016	#DRUnstoppableJasmine	12.7%	#1	#4	
118	After the Storm	February 24, 2016	#DRAfterTheStorm	14.1%	#1	#4	
119	Embarrassment	February 25, 2016	#DREmbarrassment	13.7%	#1	#5	
120	Angry Lito	February 26, 2016	#DRAngryLito	13.9%	#1	#4	
121	New Look	February 29, 2016	#DRNewLook	13.7%	#1	#5	

=== March 2016 ===
Episode		Original air date	Social Media Hashtag	AGB Nielsen Mega Manila Households in Television Homes			Ref.
Episode		Original air date	Social Media Hashtag	Rating	Timeslot Rank	Daytime Rank	Ref.
122	Poor Jasmine	March 1, 2016	#DRPoorJasmine	11.9%	#1	#6	
123	Lito's Threat	March 2, 2016	#DRLitosThreat	13.4%	#1	#5	
124	Never Again	March 3, 2016	#DRNeverAgain	14.9%	#1	#4	
125	Blackmailing Bethilda	March 4, 2016	#DRBlackmailingBethilda	14.9%	#1	#5	
126	Seduction	March 7, 2016	#DRSeduction	13.8%	#1	#4	
127	Family Saves	March 8, 2016	#DRFamilySaves	13.0%	#1	#5	
128	Destiny Falls	March 9, 2016	#DRDestinyFalls	15.5%	#1	#3	
129	Comatose	March 10, 2016	#DRComatose	15.1%	#1	#3	
130	Finale	March 11, 2016	#DestinyRoseFinale	17.2%	#1	#3	
