= Shining Inheritance (Philippine TV series) =

Philippine television series

- Title card
- Genre: Drama
- Based on: Brilliant Legacy (2009) by So Hyun-kyung
- Written by: Luningning Interino-Ribay; Christine Badillo-Novicio; Wiro Michael Ladera
- Directed by: Jorron Monroy
- Creative director: Aloy Adlawan
- Starring: Kate Valdez
- Theme music composer: Anne Margaret-Figueroa
- Opening theme: "Walang Hanggan" by Zephanie Dimaranan
- Country of origin: Philippines
- Original language: Tagalog
- No. of episodes: 90

Production
- Executive producer: Nieva Sabit-Magpayo
- Cinematography: Apollo Anao
- Editors: Benedict Lavastida; Richard Gonzales
- Camera setup: Multiple-camera setup
- Running time: 26–35 minutes
- Production company: GMA Entertainment Group

Original release
- Network: GMA Network
- Release: September 9, 2024 – January 10, 2025

Shining Inheritance is a Philippine television drama series broadcast by GMA Network. Directed by Jorron Monroy, it stars Kate Valdez. The series is based on a 2009 South Korean television series, Brilliant Legacy. It premiered on September 9, 2024, on the network's Afternoon Prime line up. The series concluded on January 10, 2025, with a total of 90 episodes.

The series is streaming online on YouTube.

== Premise ==
Inna is eager to fulfill her dream of eventually having her own restaurant. Her path becomes harder when her father passes away, leading to the collapse of their family business. With a "difficult" stepmother and stepsister, Inna and her brother must pass through several chains of unwanted events.

== Cast and characters ==
Cast

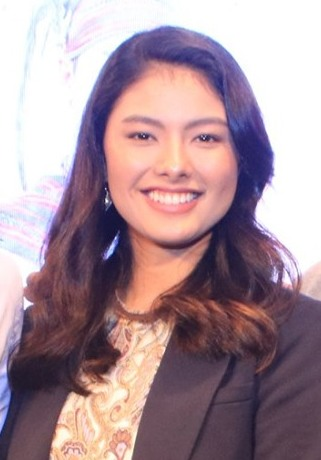
Kate Valdez

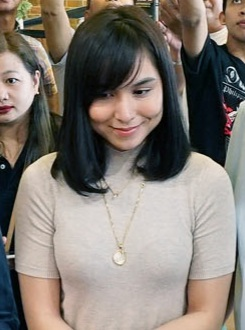
Kyline Alcantara

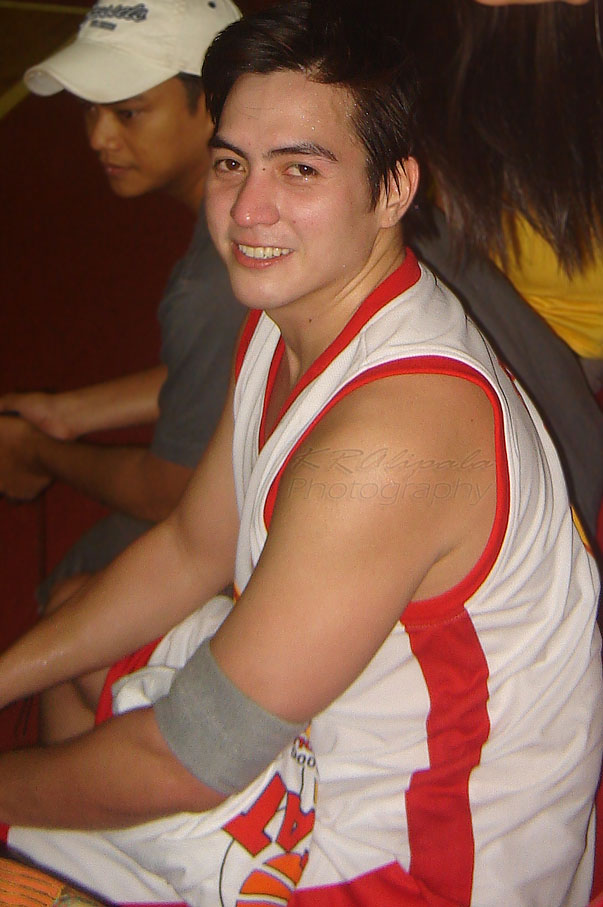
Wendell Ramos

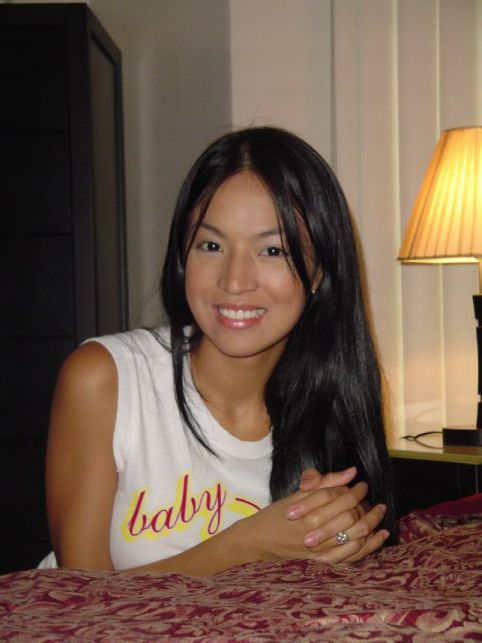
Aubrey Miles

Lead cast

- Kate Valdez as Martina "Inna" R. Villarazon

Supporting cast

- Kyline Alcantara as Joanna D. dela Costa
- Paul Salas as Francis Abrigo
- Michael Sager as Euan D. dela Costa
- Coney Reyes as Aurea dela Costa / Pink
- Wendell Ramos as Charlie Abrigo
- Glydel Mercado as Lani Vergara-Villarazon
- Aubrey Miles as Sonia dela Cuesta-dela Costa
- Roxie Smith as Aimee Vergara
- Gio Alvarez as Edwin Rodriguez
- Dave Bornea as Archie Almerio
- Jamir Zabarte as Mark Villarazon
- Seth dela Cruz as Nono Villarazon
- Charlize Ruth Reyes as Cecile Bautista

Guest cast

- Ariel Rivera as Tony Villarazon
- Bernard Palanca as Rodante V. dela Costa
- Amy Austria as Rosario
- Mikee Quintos as younger Aurea
- Al Tantay as Bonifacio "Boni" Perez
- Prince Villanueva as Lawrence Sulit-Almerio
- Pancho Magno as Paolo
- Gaby Concepcion as herself
- Mel Kimura as Marietta
- Robert Ortega as Nicholas
- Rosemarie Sarita as Adelina
- Sunshine Teodoro as Lily
- Marnie Lapuz as Lani
- Seb Pajarillo as Elton
- Bella Thompson as Sara
- Jose Sarasola as Leon
- Ella Cristofani as Lorie
- Keanu McGrath as Kaloy
- Sandro Muhlach as Joseph
- Julia Pascual as Sophia Bautista
- Matthew Uy as Jason Vergara
- Timothy Chan as Mico Villarazon
- Migs Villasis as Marco Abrigo
- Myke Burlungan as Dave Manahan
- Mitzi Josh as Amalia Rodriguez
- Pamela Kaye as Karen Monteclaro
- Monique Vasquez as Alona
- Luke Conde as Brian
- Larkin Castor as Aldus
- Jin Macapagal as Justin
- Rein Hillary as Blaire
- Arhia Faye Agas as younger Joanna
- Dennah Bautista as younger Inna
- Stanley Abuloc as younger Euan

== Development ==
Brilliant Legacy is a 2009 South Korean television drama series broadcast by Seoul Broadcasting System. Written by So Hyun-kyung and directed by Jin Hyuk, the series starred Han Hyo-joo and Lee Seung-gi. In the same year, the series was later aired in the Philippines, through GMA Network.

== Production ==
Principal photography commenced in October 2023.

== Ratings ==
According to AGB Nielsen Philippines' Nationwide Urban Television Audience Measurement People in Television Homes, the pilot episode of Shining Inheritance earned a 6.1% rating.
