= Filipino idol =

Type of entertainer

A Filipino idol, widely known as P-pop idol (combining the shortened form of Pinoy pop and the word idol), is a type of entertainer in Philippine popular culture. This concept is often associated with group acts, but some soloists have been identified as P-pop idols as well. Although initially created to emulate the Korean and Japanese idol industries, P-pop is marketed as a distinct system with its own conventions and fan culture. The industry is also said to be a potential soft power for the Philippines.

Unlike K-pop and J-pop idols who typically maintain an image of perfection, P-pop idols capitalize on their perceived authenticity and accessibility to fans. Groups from the 2000s to 2010s set the foundation for a so-called P-pop renaissance in the 2020s, a decade that has seen many idol groups debut in the Philippines.

P-pop idol groups with the highest-charting songs on Billboard

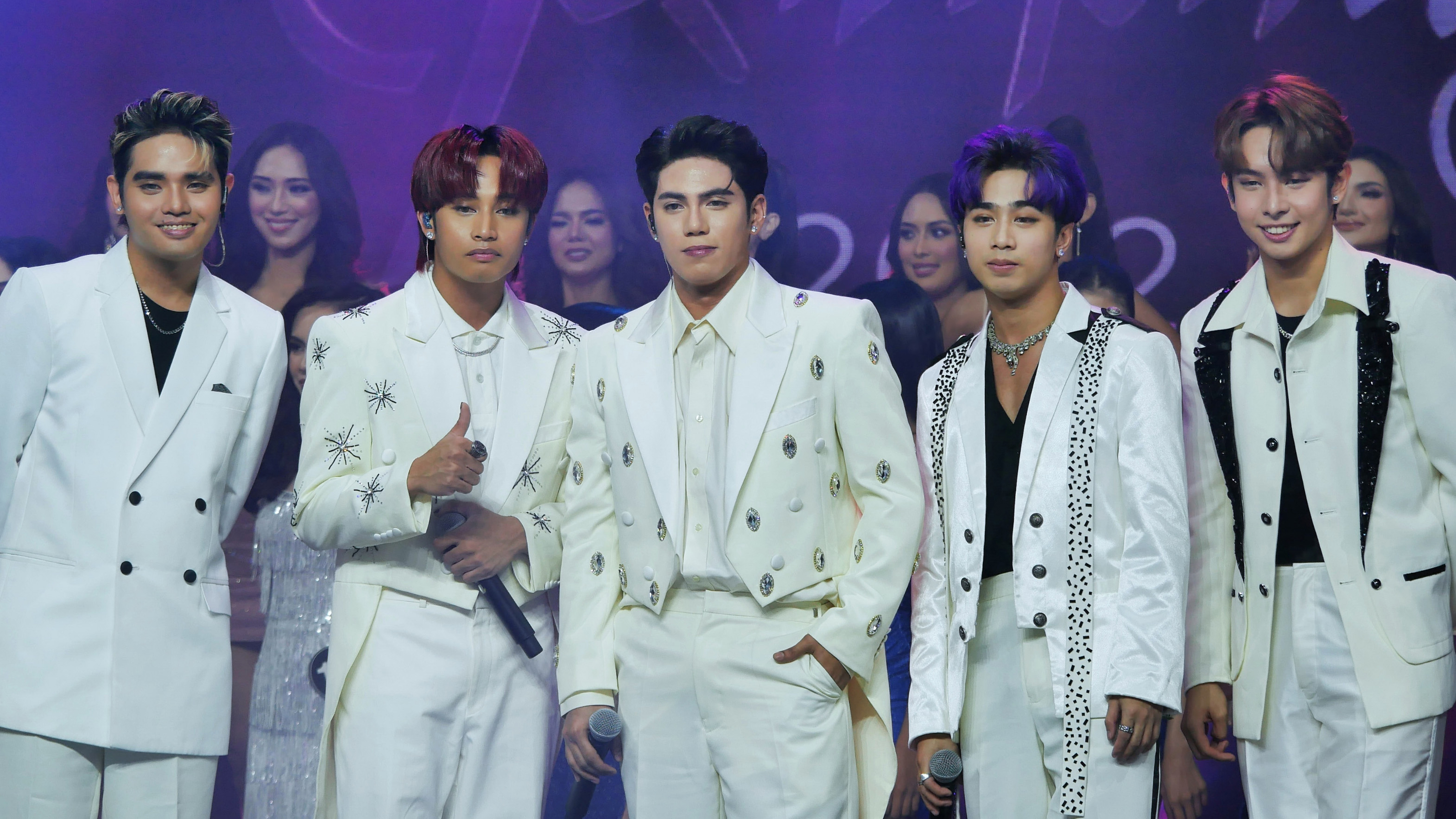
SB19 (pictured 2022)

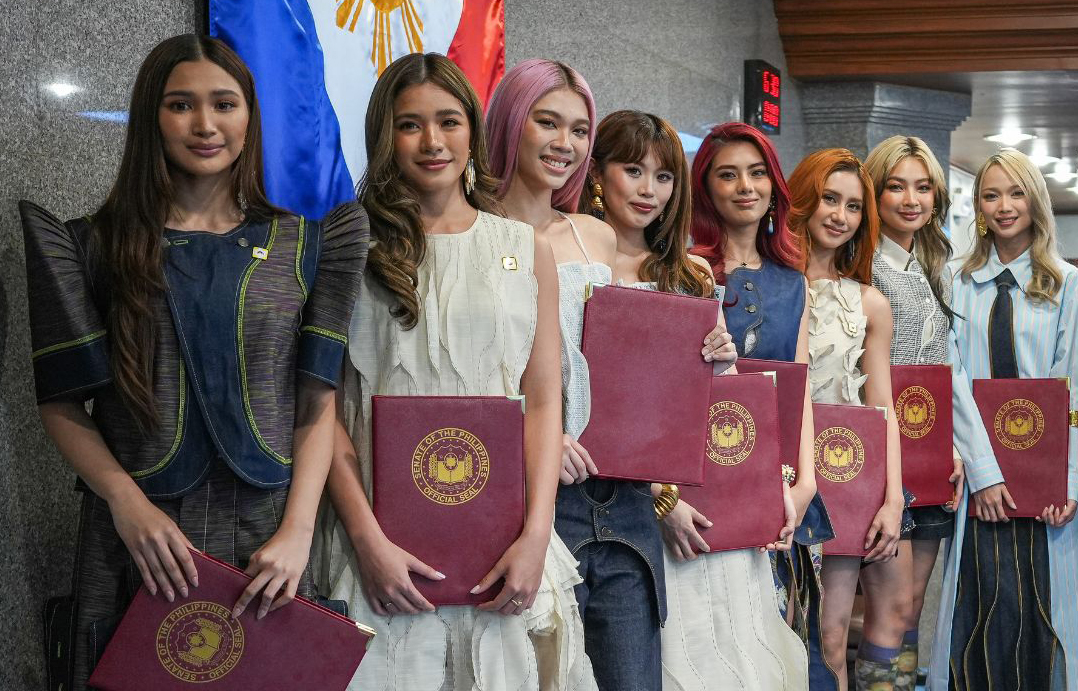
Bini (pictured 2026)

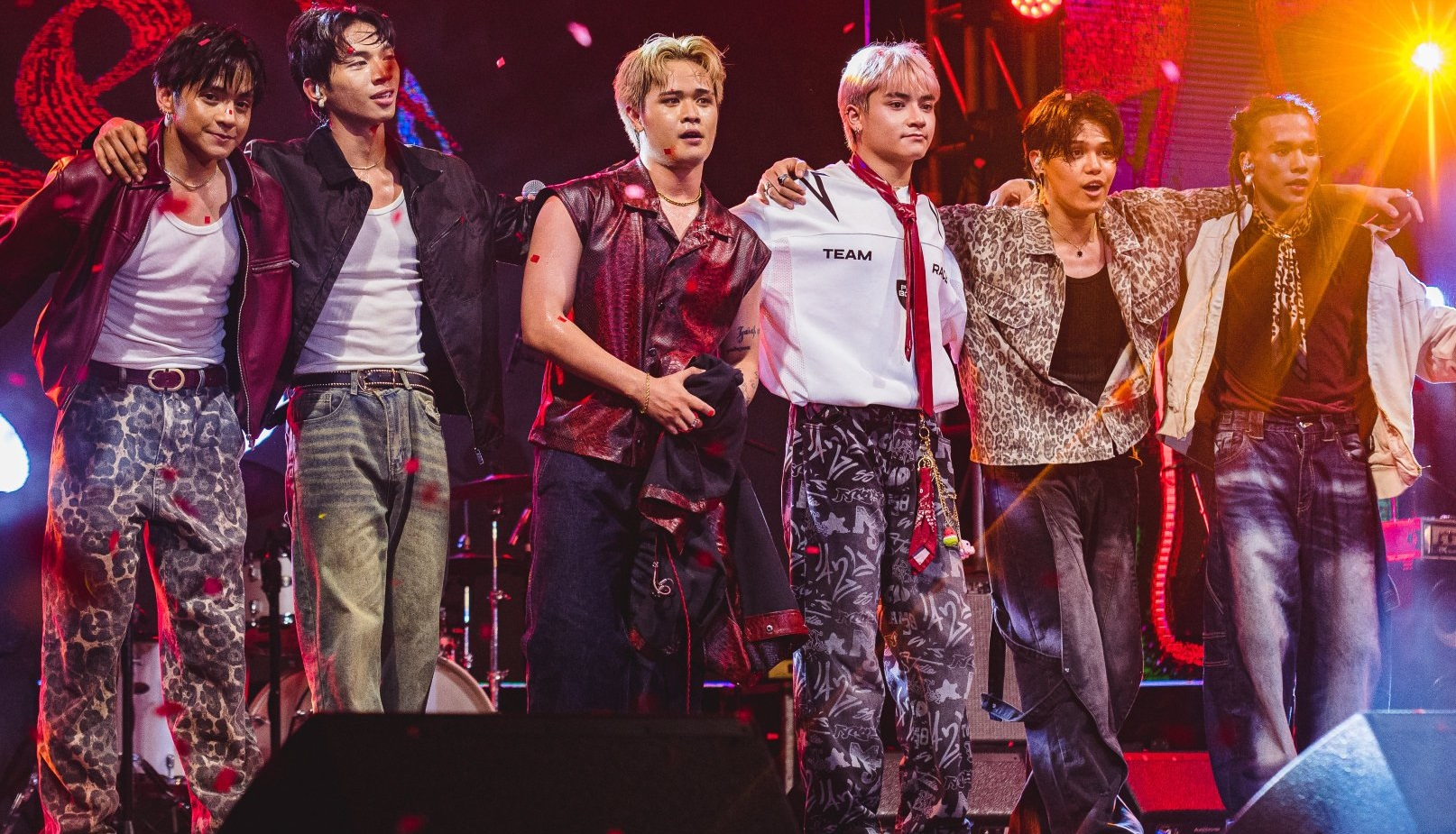
Alamat (pictured 2024)

== Definition ==
=== Training ===
A Filipino idol, widely known as P-pop idol (combining the shortened form of Pinoy pop and the word idol), is a type of entertainer in Philippine popular culture. Influenced by the Korean and Japanese idol industries, P-pop idols often debut in their teens or twenties and emphasize "eye-catching" visual presentation such as brightly dyed hair and extravagant costumes. Energetic performances are also prioritized, with group acts engaging in synchronized dancing.

British magazine i-D characterized the P-pop idol trainee system as relaxed in comparison to K-pop's, despite taking inspiration from the latter. Film director Jason Paul Laxamana, who oversees P-pop boy band Alamat, claimed that idols in the Philippines are afforded control over their own personal lives and creative output. Members of the P-pop groups Vxon, Yara, and Press Hit Play who previously trained under Korean companies have likewise stated that K-pop training is much stricter than P-pop training.

Like idols from other countries, P-pop idols rigorously train to develop their singing and dancing skills and are usually discouraged from gaining weight. Actress Olive May said that she felt the pressure to follow a restrictive diet when she was still a member of the girl group Calista, but was eventually convinced to eat more healthily by the people around her when her extreme thinness caused concern. She has stated on multiple occasions that P-pop is less harsh than its foreign counterparts, particularly when it comes to body image and fan culture.

=== Public image ===
Personality and accessibility are said to be defining characteristics of P-pop idols. Unlike K-pop and J-pop idols who maintain an "overly manufactured" image of purity, P-pop idols are "free to let loose". Likewise, Vogue Philippines' Gaby Gloria said that in other cultures, "the very idea of a pop idol is synonymous with perfection [and] unattainable standards", but many P-pop idols defy these ideas. In an interview with Rolling Stone Philippines, Viva Records marketer Ken Opiña said that for P-pop idols, "it's not just music that's just being sold, not just visuals, but their stories, their journey". In an interview with various members of P-pop idol groups such as G22 and YGIG, Mega's Rafael Bautista wrote, "P-pop idols aren't just blank canvases but talented individuals who have put in the work to follow their dreams." In the Philippine Daily Inquirer's Pop! section, Sophia Erinn Mape wrote that "one could say that P-pop idols have more freedom [than K-pop idols]" within fan interactions. Another article in the newspaper's Lifestyle section claimed that P-pop idols generally lack media training, making them more "authentic" yet more prone to disappointing their fans and disrupting parasocial fantasies, a vital component of the "idol" model.

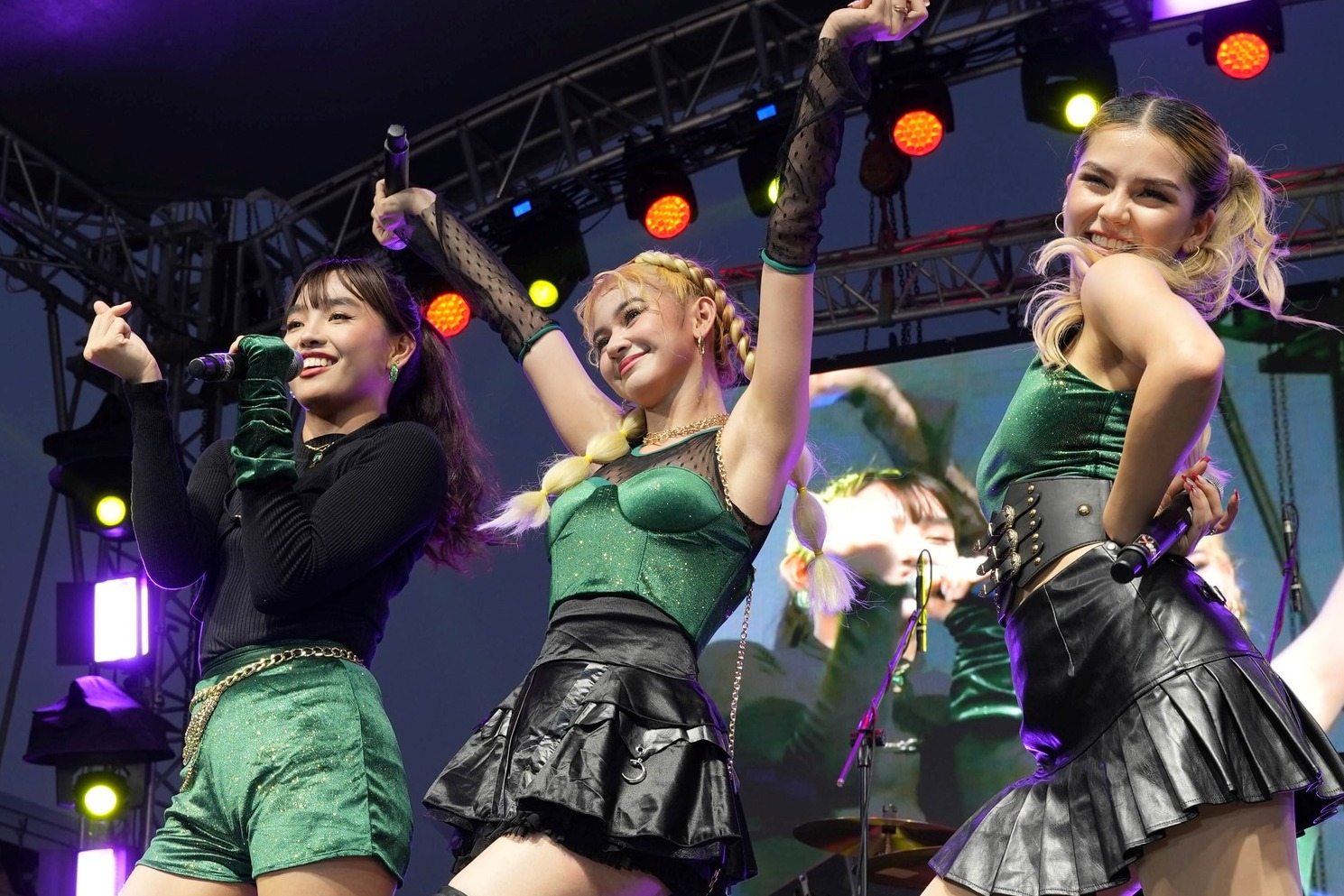
G22 (pictured)

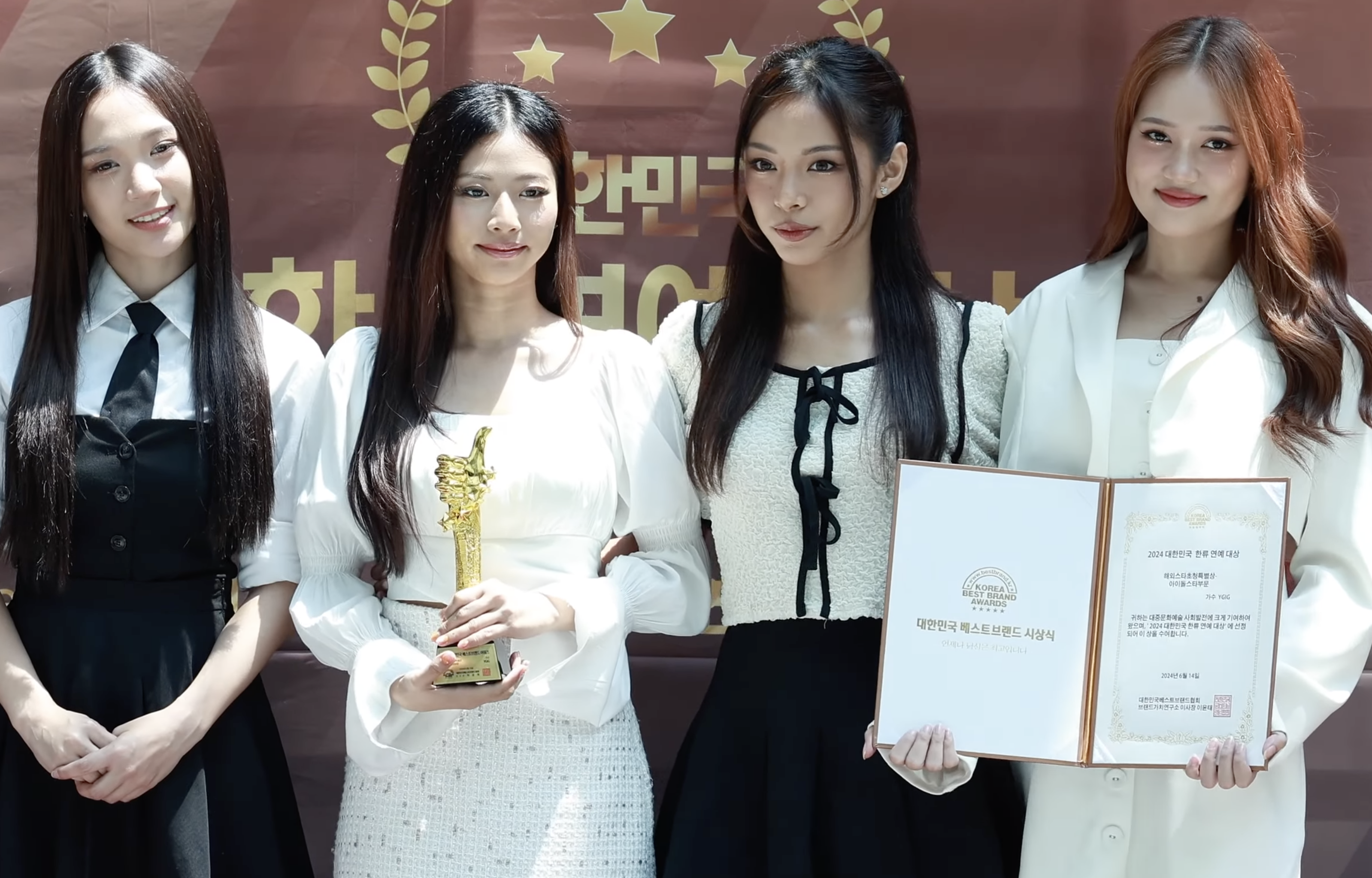
YGIG (pictured)

In a JoySauce feature, American producer Michael "Lindgren" Schulz — who has produced for K-pop groups like BTS and TXT as well as Western artists like Dua Lipa — said that the "seemingly unending abundance" of singing talent in the Philippines is one of P-pop's advantages over similar industries. Multiple sources have also noted that unlike many other Asian countries, "almost everyone" in the Philippines speaks English fluently, giving P-pop idols another advantage when promoting overseas. However, singing in their native languages is said to give P-pop idols their distinct identity, as demonstrated by SB19, Alamat, and Bini especially. The P-pop idol industry has been recognized as a potential soft power for the Philippines.

== History ==
=== 2000s to 2010s ===
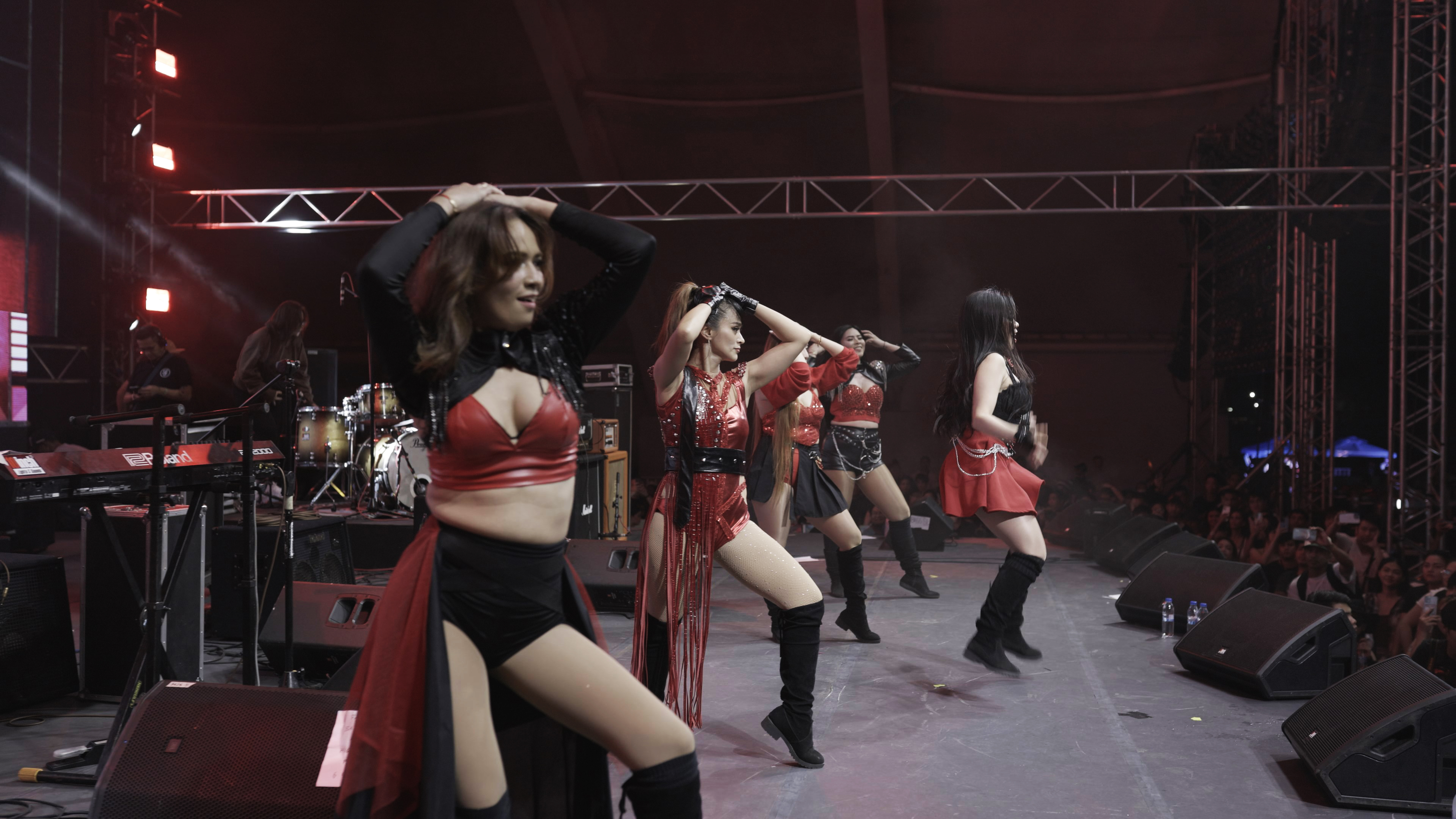
SexBomb Girls (pictured 2023)

According to Philstar Life's Ian Urrutia, the term "P-pop" originated in the late 2000s as an attempt to "ride the coattails" of the Korean wave. Several groups from the late 2000s to the early to mid 2010s, such as Chicser, the Streetboys (stylized in all caps), XLR8, Pop Girls, and the Sexbomb Girls, provided the foundation for the P-pop idol industry. Although retrospective articles said that the P-pop idols of this time released good songs, these groups failed to gain traction and were met with skepticism from the public. A Vera Files report from 2011 quoted Filipinos who provided negative to mixed opinions about P-pop idols. A respondent named Andrea Salutin told the publication that P-pop "won't really work" and that its idols were "trying too hard". Another named Happee Sy said that she believed P-pop idols were "going overboard" and copying K-pop excessively.

In 2018, J-pop group AKB48's Filipino sister group MNL48 debuted; multiple sources credit them for bringing the idol system inspired by East Asian idols — particularly Japanese — to P-pop. In the same year, the boy band SB19 debuted; although officially marketed as a P-pop group, Korean sources associated with K-pop. Maeil Business Newspaper deemed them "Korean-styled Philippine idols", while The Korea Times called them an "all-Filipino K-pop boy band". In a 2021 thesis for the Seoul National University, Chun Jui Hsu attributed the K-pop associations to SB19's label heavily promoting the fact that the members were trained in Korea by Korean companies, though the group's music was notably different in sound from K-pop. They have been credited for making P-pop mainstream and drawing international attention to the industry.

=== 2020s ===
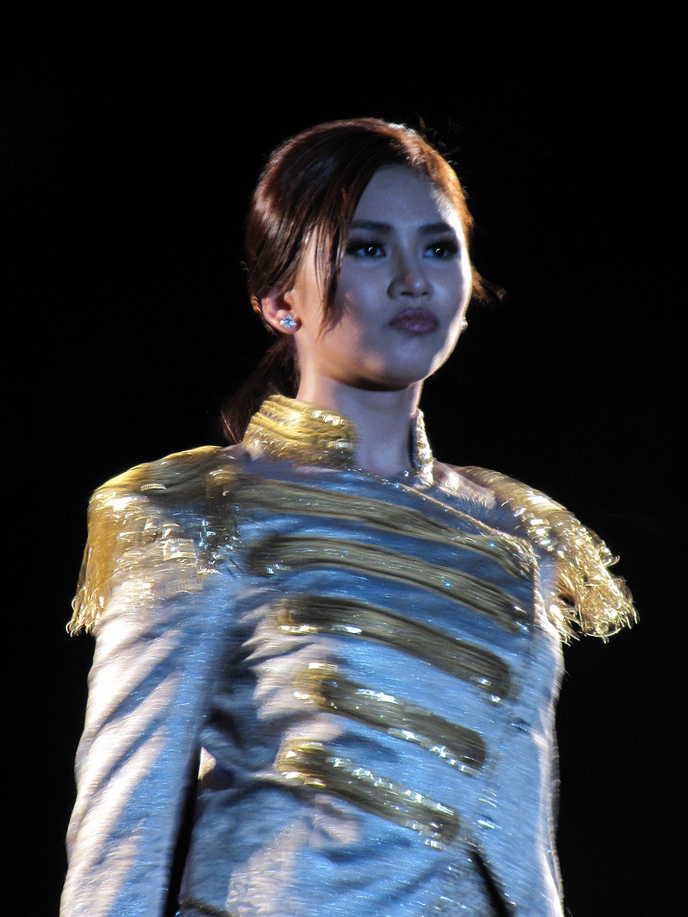
Sarah Geronimo (pictured 2011)

Numerous P-pop idol groups debuted in the 2020s, leading to what the Philippine Daily Inquirer's Hannah Mallorca described as a P-pop renaissance. Some P-pop idols have also debuted as soloists, though they are rarer. Bini, BGYO, and Alamat, who all debuted in 2021, were identified by Al Jazeera English as three notable P-pop groups introduced in this decade. In particular, Bini achieved chart and streaming success in 2024, making them the "no. 1 act in the Philippines" according to Billboard and a "national mood board" for the country according to Tatler Asia; the latter magazine also described Alamat as "the most culturally specific group in P-pop", adding that no discussion of Southeast Asian pop groups would be complete without them.

In 2024, the research firm Capstone-Intel Corporation identified a "P-pop wave" that could potentially boost the Philippines' creative sector. On March 23, 2026, the GMA Network series Born to Shine premiered, starring Zephanie Dimaranan, Michael Sager, and former P-pop idol Olive May. The series revolves around the careers and lives of fictional P-pop idols. In April, Bini performed at the 2026 iteration of the American music festival Coachella; they were the first Filipino act to perform at the event. SB19 will also be the first Filipino to act at Lollapalooza, another American festival.

According to Robert Requintina of the Manila Bulletin, these festival appearances signaled the "arrival" of P-pop and its growing international recognition. Al Jazeera also reported that increasing numbers of Southeast Asian audiences were listening to domestic acts like P-pop idols. Billboard Philippines reported in June that SB19, Bini, and Alamat were the highest-charting P-pop groups on their charts, and Sarah Geronimo the highest-charting P-pop soloist. In the same month, the Philippines' Department of Tourism stated that they planned to appoint two P-pop groups as their ambassadors, with Bini being confirmed and the other yet to be disclosed.
