= Born to Shine (Philippine TV series) =

2026 Philippine television drama series

- Title card
- Genre: Drama; Musical
- Directed by: Rod Marmol
- Starring: Zephanie Dimaranan; Michael Sager; Olive May
- Country of origin: Philippines
- Original language: Tagalog
- No. of episodes: 207

Production
- Running time: 25–30 minutes
- Production company: GMA Entertainment Group

Original release
- Network: GMA Network
- Release: March 23, 2026 – present

Born to Shine is a 2026 Philippine television drama musical series broadcast by GMA Network. Directed by Rod Marmol, it stars Zephanie Dimaranan as Jennifer "Jennie" Sicat, a young woman who dreams of becoming a P-pop idol against the wishes of her mother Minchie (Manilyn Reynes). The cast also includes Michael Sager, Olive May, Vina Morales, and Sheryl Cruz. Shine premiered on March 23, 2026 on the network's Afternoon Prime line-up.

Early episodes of Shine, aired in its first few months, received positive commentary from publications such as The Freeman. Later episodes garnered mixed reviews, with one of the show's storylines from September to November 2026 being criticized as lesbophobic by LGBTQ+ magazine Outrage. Critical reception is generally positive towards Dimaranan's performance.

== Premise ==
Jennifer "Jennie" Sicat (Zephanie Dimaranan) dreams of becoming a P-pop idol and begins training as a member of the fictional girl group Yumi (stylized in all caps). However, her mother Minchie (Manilyn Reynes) disapproves of Jennie’s ambitions, having been traumatized by her past career as a singer-songwriter.

== Cast and characters ==
Cast

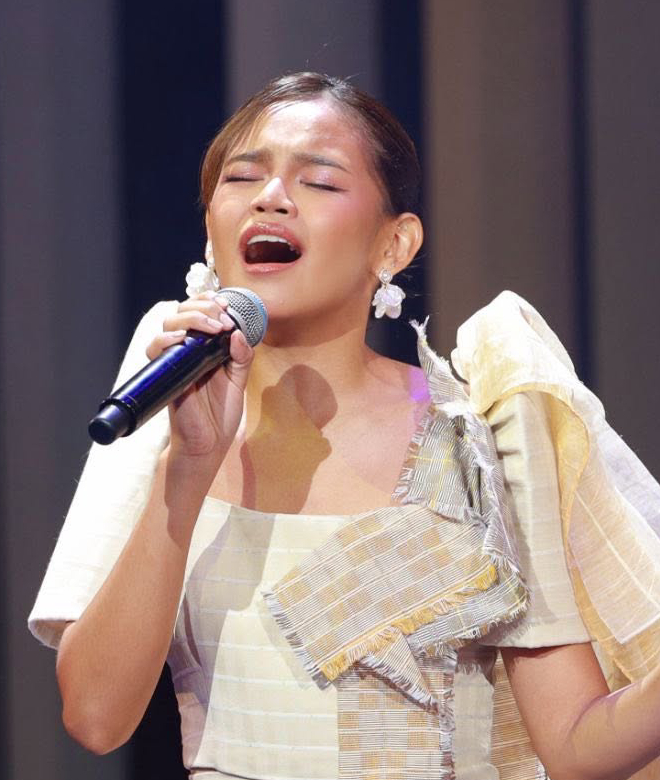
Zephanie Dimaranan

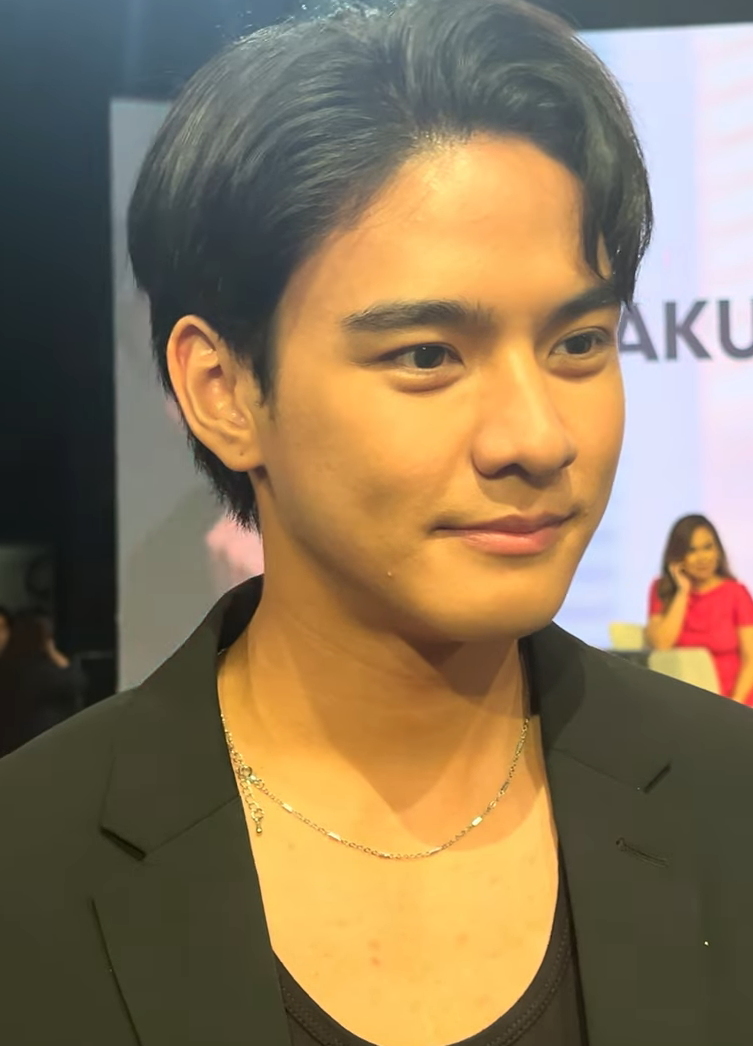
Michael Sager

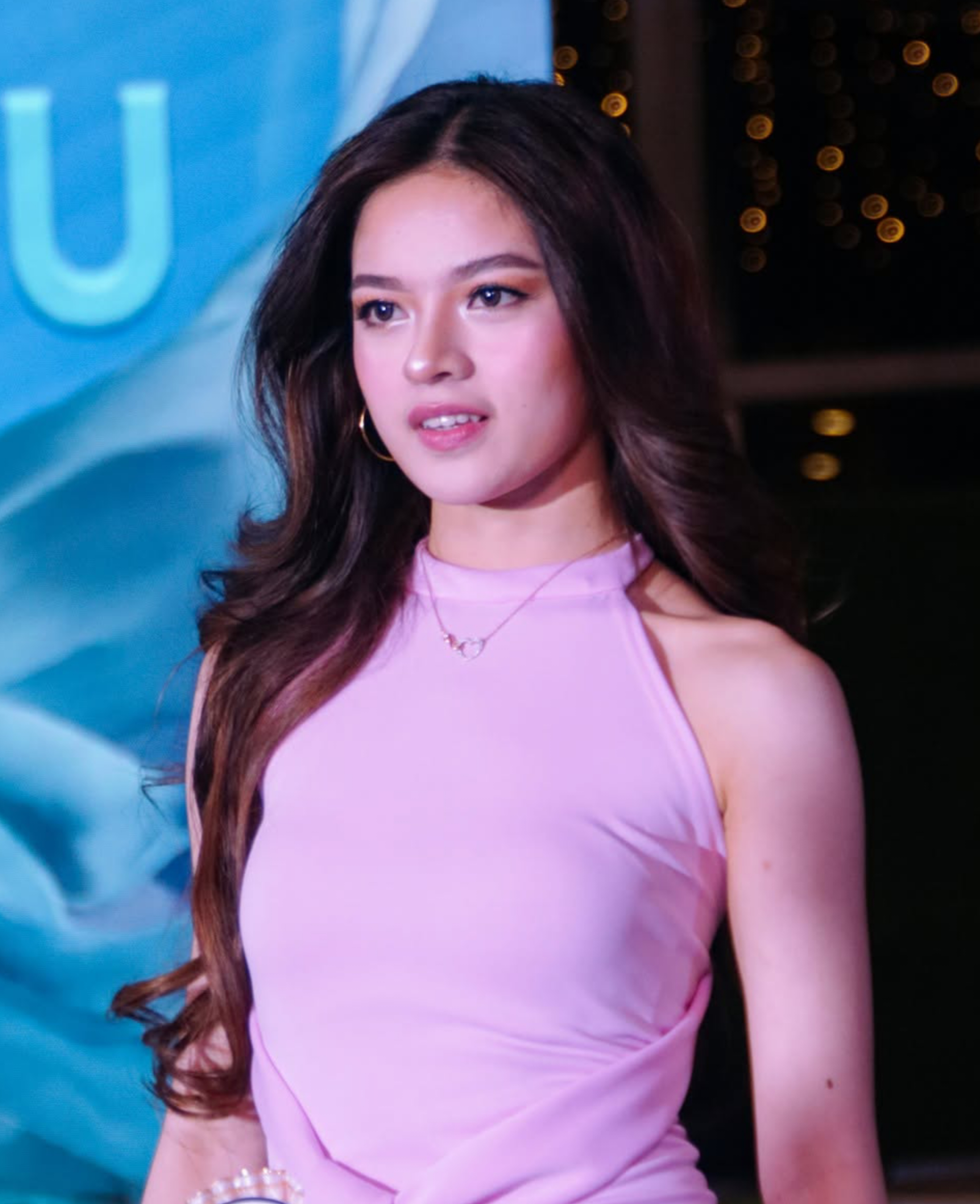
Olive May

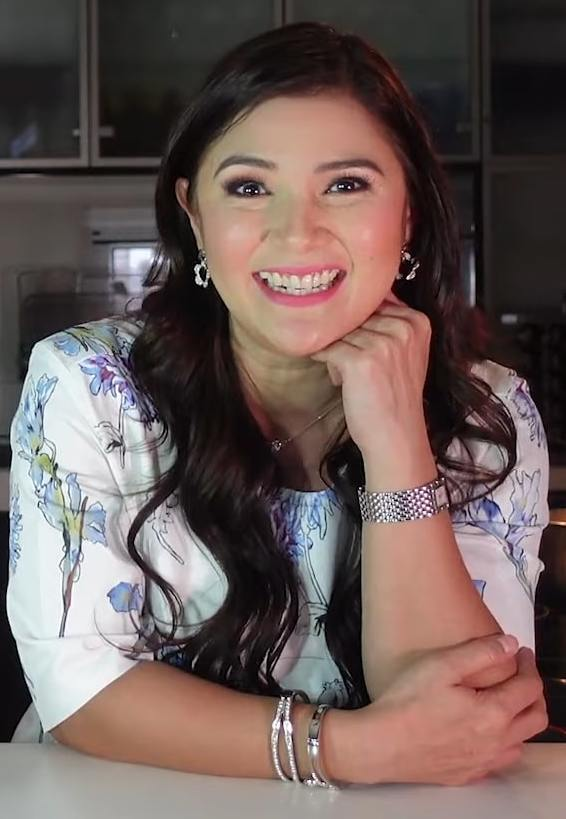
Vina Morales

Lead cast

- Zephanie Dimaranan as Jennifer "Jennie" Sicat (Note: Some reports state that the character's nickname is spelled "Jennie". However, The Freeman and Outrage Magazine spell it as "Jeni". In two separate articles, Pulp writers have used both spellings. It is unclear which one is the official spelling. This article uses "Jennie" for consistency, as it is the spelling first reported by the media.)
- Michael Sager as Nate Lim
- Olive May as Megan Halari

Supporting cast

- Manilyn Reynes as Minchie Reyes Sicat
- Vina Morales as Dara Halari
- Smokey Manaloto as Perry Sicat
- Roselle Nava as Monica
- Tessie Tomas as Amelia Halari
- Sheryl Cruz as Giovanna "Vanna" Grande (Note: In an article published by PEP.ph a month before the series premiere, the name provided for Cruz's character is "Ivana".)
- Miggs Cuaderno as Basha
- Gaea Mischa as Nancy Sebastian (Note: In a Philippine Daily Inquirer article published a few days before the series premiere, the name provided for Mischa's character is "Hera".)
- Naya Ambi as Alfea Torres (Note: In a Philippine Daily Inquirer article published a few days before the series premiere, the name provided for Ambi's character is "Stella".)
- Mitzi Josh as Yuna Mercado (Note: In a Philippine Daily Inquirer article published a few days before the series premiere, the name provided for Josh's character is "Bea".)
- Kobie Brown as JC
- Tina Paner as Charice
- Josh Ford as Drew

Other cast

- AC Bonifacio as Kendall Domingo
- Golden Cañedo as Lexi Hipolito
- BGYO as themselves
- Charm Aranton as Chichi
- Karenina Haniel as Vic
- Mikee Quintos as younger Minchie
- Julie Anne San Jose as younger Dara
- Rayver Cruz as Dio
- Aaliyah De Gracia as Tiffany
- Angelika Santiago as Rami
- Chloe Redondo as Gabby

== Background and release ==
Born to Shine was first announced by GMA in November 2025. The series is directed by Rod Mamarol. Shine premiered on March 23, 2026, as a part of GMA Network's Afternoon Prime programming. It is also available internationally through GMA Pinoy TV.

== Casting and development ==
In November 2025, the cast of Born to Shine was introduced at a press conference. According to Manila Standard's Nickie Wang, its protagonist Jennie's story has similarities to her actress Zephanie Dimaranan's career trajectory in real life. The lead cast contains three Cebuano actors: Olive May, Vina Morales, and Manilyn Reynes. According to May, they spoke Cebuano (Bisaya) on set. Reynes's character Minchie is also Cebuano in the show.

In July 2026, AC Bonifacio and Golden Cañedo were added to the cast. In October, Michael Sager left the show and his character Nate, Jennie's original love interest, was killed off. In the same month, Josh Ford joined the cast as Jennie's new love interest Drew.

== Promotion ==
Born to Shine's first soundtrack album was released in May 2026, featuring original songs from the show. In July, Shine held a Grand Fans Day at SM Center Muntinlupa in the Philippines. Several cast members were scheduled to attend and perform. The event also celebrated the show's second soundtrack album release. Zephanie Dimaranan, Olive May, Naya Ambi, Gaea Mischa, and Mitzi Josh performed together as Shine's central girl group Yumi at the 2026 Filipino Diaspora Summit organized by the Commission on Filipinos Overseas.

== Reception ==
=== Reviews ===
In April 2026, Born to Shine was included in When in Manila's "6 Shows That Every Fan of OPM and P-pop Should Watch" listicle. Its writer Andrea Posadas appreciated the show for giving viewers an "inside look" into the P-pop industry. She also called Shine's cast "exceptionally talented". In May, Januar Junior Aguja of The Freeman said that the show "deserves more attention". He also believed that Zephanie Dimaranan's lead role as Jennie could be the "most defining" one of her career. Writing for the LGBTQ+ magazine Outrage, Julienne Loreto said that Shine's early episodes had the potential to "breathe new life" into teleseryes (Philippine soap operas), complimenting the "perfect" casting, "vibrant" visuals, and "beautiful" Visayan representation especially.

In September that year, Simon Tan of Pulp gave Born to Shine a positive review. He considered the show to be a "full-circle moment" for Dimaranan. He also praised her chemistry with co-star Michael Sager. Through Outrage, Loreto criticized the perceived lesbophobia in later episodes, specifically in the way that Vic (Karenina Haniel), a butch lesbian character, was written. In some episodes that aired from September to November, Vic was depicted as predatory towards heterosexual female characters. Notably, she was shown drugging multiple women with the intent to violate them, including the protagonist. Loreto wrote that the character's storyline perpetuated "dangerous" stereotypes against lesbians, a demographic at risk of being targeted by homophobic rape in real life.

=== Ratings ===
In May 2026, Born to Shine garnered its highest ratings so far, 7.1%, according to National Urban Television Audience Measurement (NUTAM) data by AGB Nielsen Philippines. Per NUTAM again, Born to Shine remained one of the Top 30 programs in the Philippines as of September.
