= Calista (group) =

Filipino girl group

- Origin: Manila, Philippines
- Genres: P-pop; dance-pop
- Years active: 2022–present
- Labels: Madhouse Music, Merlion Music
- Members: Anne Tenorio; Dain Leones; Denise Pello; Elle Pascual
- Past members: Laiza Comia; Olive May
- Website: facebook.com/calistamusicofficial

Calista is a Filipino girl group. Initially consisting of six members, the group was formed in October 24, 2021. The group made their debut on February 14, 2022 with their single "Race Car".

== Name ==
Calista is a Greek name for "most beautiful". It is also a shortened term for "Call it a Star". Olive came up with the name.

Their fandom is called A-Listas.

== History ==
In March 2021, Tyronne Escalante Artist Management and Merlion Entertainment held an audition to form a new girl group. Over 100 girls auditioned. The number was reduced to 50, then 25. In October 24, the final 6 members were chosen: Olive, Laiza, Anne, Denise, Elle, and Dain.

On February 14, 2022, Calista made their debut with their first single "Race Car". On April 26, 2022, Calista were among the groups that performed at the Vax to Normal concert at the Smart Araneta Coliseum. In late that year, Calista released their second single "Don't Have Time", and later their Christmas singles "Christmas Rush" and "Christmas in the Philippines".

On March 17, 2023, Calista released their third single "Ugnayan". The following month, Laiza left the group to focus on her studies.

On January 7, 2024, Olive left the group to focus on her acting career. She is currently co-managed by Sparkle GMA Artist Center and Merlion Entertainment.

In February 2025, Calista released their EP Four, which contains the main single "Alas Dose".

On June 1, 2026, Calista parted ways with Merlion Entertainment. A week later, they signed with Wide International and appeared in that year's Thailand International Festival.

== Members ==
=== Current ===
- Anne Tenorio (2022–present)
- Dain Leones (2022–present)
- Denise Pello (2022–present)
- Elle Pascual (2022–present)

=== Former ===
- Laiza Comia (2022–2023)
- Olive May (2022–2024)

== Discography ==
=== EPs ===
- 2025 - Four

=== Singles ===
- 2022 - "Race Car"
- 2022 - "Don't Have Time"
- 2023 - "Ugnayan"
- 2024 - "Alas Dose"
- 2024 - "LMK (Let Me Know)"
