= Maka (TV series) =

Philippine television drama series

- Title card in 2025
- Also known as: Maka: The Next Chapter
- Genre: Teen drama; Musical
- Created by: Rod Marmol
- Written by: Ceres Helga Barrios; May Delos Santos; Troy Espiritu
- Directed by: Rod Marmol
- Starring: Romnick Sarmenta; Zephanie; Marco Masa; Ashley Sarmiento; Dylan Menor; John Clifford; Olive May
- Opening theme: "Patuloy ang Pangarap" by Zephanie
- Country of origin: Philippines
- Original language: Tagalog
- No. of seasons: 3
- No. of episodes: 40

Production
- Executive producer: Richell Equiron
- Cinematography: Jonjon Corpus
- Editors: Mark Andrew Antonio; Bunny Sison; Jack Cabayanan; Fredie Abril
- Camera setup: Multiple-camera setup
- Running time: 27–29 minutes
- Production company: GMA Public Affairs

Original release
- Network: GMA Network
- Release: September 21, 2024 – August 16, 2025

Maka is a Philippine television teen drama series broadcast by GMA Network. Directed by Rod Marmol, it stars Romnick Sarmenta, Zephanie, Marco Masa, Ashley Sarmiento, Dylan Menor, Olive May and John Clifford. It premiered on September 21, 2024, on the network's Sabado Star Power sa Hapon line up. The series concluded on August 16, 2025, with a total of three seasons and 40 episodes.

The series is streaming online on YouTube.

== Premise ==
V returns to his hometown and hesitant to teach in Douglas MacArthur High School. By serving as a mentor, he will learn lessons from his students.

== Cast and characters ==
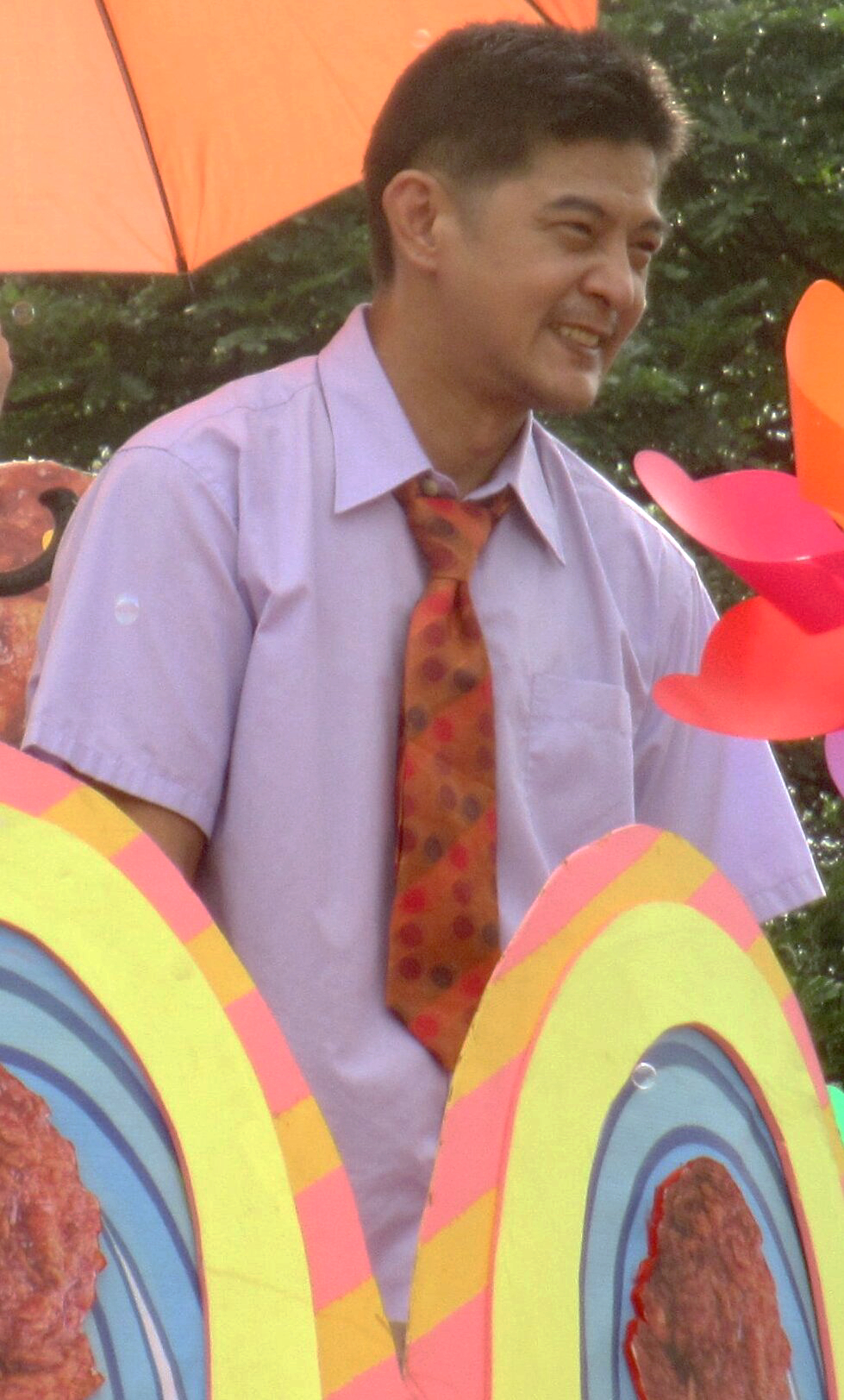
Romnick Sarmenta portrays V.

Lead cast

- Romnick Sarmenta as Victor "V" Felipe

An art teacher in MAKA high in charge of training the students for the upcoming regional drama competition.

- Zephanie Dimaranan as Zeph Molina

A student of the Arts and Performance section who has an excellent skill in singing.

- Marco Masa as Marco Reyes

A choir member and a student of the Arts and Performance section.

- Ashley Sarmiento as Ash Salonga

She is known popularly for her online dance videos and Marco's love interest.

- Dylan Menor as Dylan Dela Paz

Known as the school's "heartthrob" and bully.

- Olive May as Livvy Ilagan

A student who has a passion in writing songs and has a talent in acting.

- John Clifford as JC Serano

A student in MAKA high and a make-up artist of dead people in their funeral home.

Supporting cast

- Chanty Videla as Chanty Villanueva
- Sean Lucas as Sean Dimaculangan
- May Ann Basa as May Ann Cortez
- Jojo Alejar as Mark
- Carmen Soriano
- Maricar de Mesa as Tonette
- Tina Paner as Nadia Molina
- Sharmaine Arnaiz as Glenda Ilagan
- Elijah Alejo as Elijah Rodente (season 2)
- Bryce Eusebio as Bryce Hernandez (season 2)
- Shan Vesagas as Shan Rodente (season 2)
- Josh Ford as Josh Taylor (season 2): Zeph's love interest.
- Cheovy Walter as Cheovy Arellano (season 2)
- MJ Encabo as MJ Lowell (season 2)
- Gladys Reyes as Chinchin (season 3)
- Jennie Gabriel as Alelie (season 3)
- Anton Vinzon as Anton Mendoza (season 3)
- Raheel Bhyria as Raheel Perez (season 3)
- Mad Ramos as Mad Sarmiento (season 3)

Guest cast

- Lloyd Samartino as Albert Rodente (season 2)
- Althea Ablan as Katya Carida (season 2)
- Rodjun Cruz as Tonio (season 2)
- Thea Tolentino as Betty (season 2)
- Liezel Lopez as Tanya (season 2)
- Christian Vasquez as Tanya's brother (season 2)
- Juancho Triviño as Rex (season 2)
- AC Bonifacio as AC Ilagan (season 2)
- Myrtle Sarrosa as Sabrina (season 3)

== Seasons ==
Season	Episodes	Originally released	
Season	Episodes	First released	Last released
1	13	September 21, 2024	December 14, 2024
2	16	February 1, 2025	May 24, 2025
3	11	June 7, 2025	August 16, 2025

== Ratings ==
According to AGB Nielsen Philippines' Nationwide Urban Television Audience Measurement People in television homes, the pilot episode of Maka earned a 6.6% rating. The second season premiere scored a 3.9% rating. The third season finale earned a 5.2% rating.

== Accolades ==
Accolades received by Maka
Year	Award	Category	Recipient	Result	Ref.
2025	38th PMPC Star Awards for Television	Best Mini Series	Maka	Nominated	
2025	38th PMPC Star Awards for Television	Best New Male TV Personality	Dylan Menor	Nominated	

== Spin-off ==
The television series, Maka Lovestream premiered on September 6, 2025, featuring new characters. The series concluded on December 13, 2025.
