= Olive May (Filipino actress) =

Filipino actress, singer and model (born 2004)

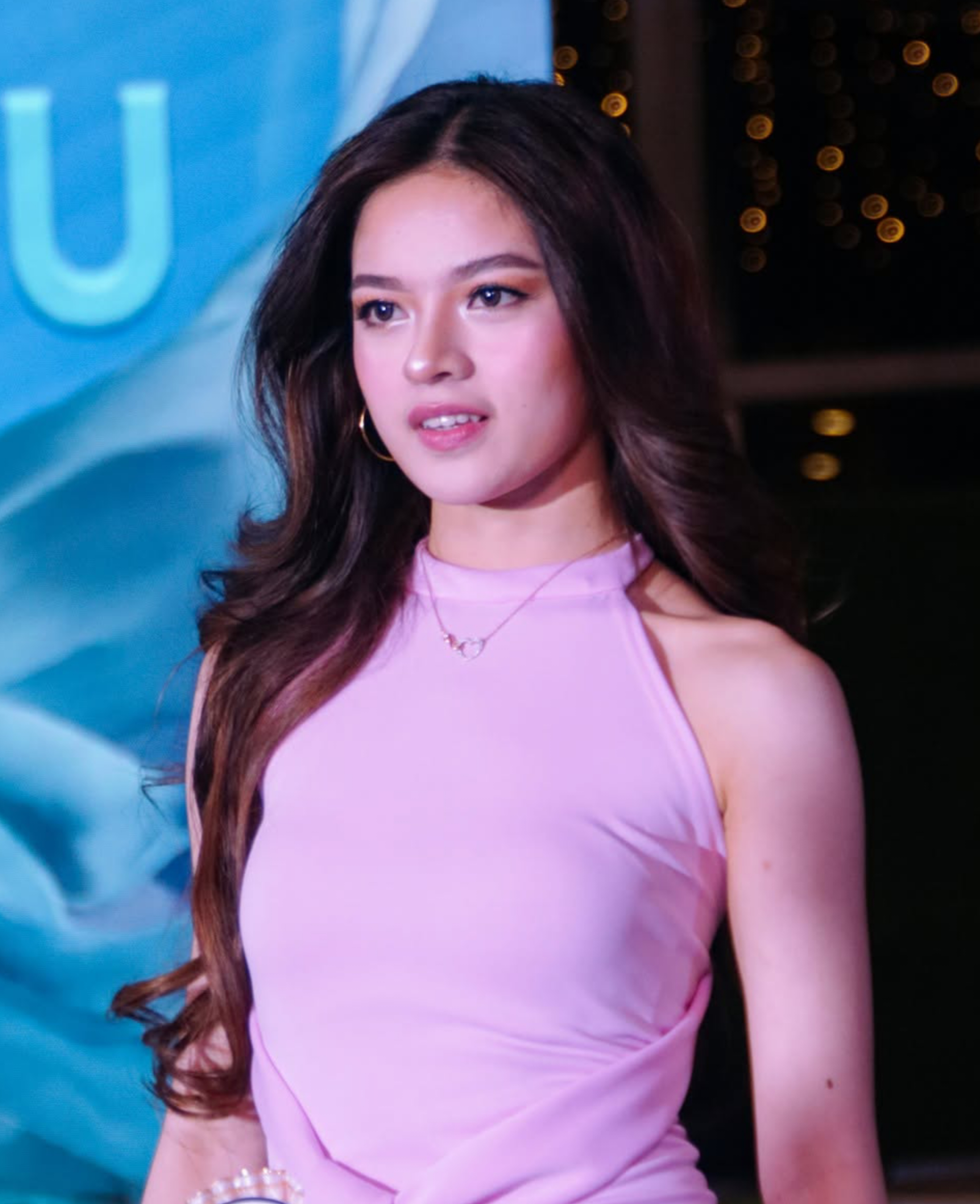
- Olive May in 2022
- Born: Olive May Sophia Bihag; May 18, 2004 (age 22); Cebu, Philippines
- Occupations: Actress; model; singer
- Years active: 2022–present
- Agents: Merlion Entertainment (2022–present); Tyronne Escalante Artist Management (2022–2023); Sparkle GMA Artist Center (2024–present)
- Known for: Maka, Born to Shine
- Height: 1.6 m (5 ft 3 in)
- Musical career
- Genres: P-pop; Pop; Dance pop
- Instrument: Vocals
- Labels: Madhouse Music; Merlion Music
- Formerly of: Calista
- Website: Official website

Olive May Sophia Bihag (born May 18, 2004) is a Filipino actress, singer, model and former beauty queen. She is a former member of girl group Calista.

== Early life ==
Olive May Bihag is a Cebuana born on May 18, 2004. She attended Academia del Christifidelis in Liloan.

== Career ==
=== Beauty pageant ===
Bihag was a beauty queen. At 14 years old, she joined Miss Teen Philippines 2019, representing Liloan, Cebu. Before she joined Miss Teen Philippines, she was also a local pageant queen titleholder in Cebu.

Her last pageant was Miss Cebu 2023, which was won by Kefaiah Al-zair.

=== Music ===
Bihag was part of the P-pop girl group Calista. The group officially debuted in February 2022 and released their debut single, Race Car in 2022. In 2024, Bihag has left the group to commit to her acting career.

=== Acting ===
Bihag officially signed with Sparkle GMA Artist Center during their "Signed for Stardom" event in May 2024. She is placed under the co-management of Merlion Entertainment and Sparkle. She adopted the screen name "Olive May" from her two given names.

May first appeared on the GMA Network when she joined the cast of the family sitcom Tols in 2022. May has also appeared in various GMA shows such as Family Feud, Amazing Earth, Pepito Manaloto: Tuloy ang Kuwento, Maka, and Forever Young.

In Born to Shine, May plays Megan Halari, the main antagonist long with Vina Morales as Dara Halari an aspiring P-pop idol who is a rival to the series' protagonist Jeni in the afternoon Musical drama series.

== Filmography ==
=== Television ===
Year	Title	Role	Notes	Ref.
2022	Tols	Olive Rogers	Supporting Role	
2024	Pepito Manaloto: Ang Tunay na Kuwento	Customer	Guest Role	
2024 - 2025	Forever Young	Nurse Jenny	Guest Role	
2024 - 2025	Maka	Livvy Ilagan	Main Role	
2025	Babae sa Bintana	Ayong	Vertical Drama	
2025	Maka Lovestream	Mayet	Episode: Manifestations	
2025	Maka Lovestream	Zoey	Episode: Ride to Forever	
2025	Maka Lovestream	Lena	Episode: Pretty Little Baby	
2025	Maka Lovestream	Noelle	Episode: Last Christmas	
2026	Kamao	Megan Halari	Guest Role	
2026	Born to Shine	Megan Halari	Main Role	

=== Variety show ===
Year	Title	Role	Notes	Ref.
2022 - 2026	All-Out Sundays	Herself (Performer)		
2022 - 2026	Family Feud	Herself (Celebrity Player)	Various Episodes	
2022 - 2026	TiktoClock	Herself (Guest)	Various Episodes	
2024-2025	Amazing Earth	Herself (Guest)	Various Episodes	
2024	Farm to Table	Herself (Guest)		
2025	The Bobay and Tekla Show	Herself (Guest)		
2026	Fast Talk with Boy Abunda	Herself (Guest)		
2026	Its Showtime	Herself (Guest)		

=== Music videos ===
Year	Title	Artist	Director	Ref.
2022	"Race Car"	Calista	Marcus Davis	
2022	"Don't Have Time"	Calista	Marcus Davis	
2022	"Christmas Rush"	Calista	Marcus Davis	
2023	"Christmas in the Philippines"	Calista	Marcus Davis	

== Discography ==
As a member of Calista
Title	Year	Album	Notes	Composer	Label
"Race Car"	2022	Non-album single	Debut single	Marcus Davis	Merlion Music
"Don't Have Time"	2022	Non-album single	Single	Marcus Davis	Merlion Music
"Christmas Rush"	2022	Non-album single	Holiday Single	Marcus Davis	Merlion Music
"Christmas in the Philippines"	2022	Non-album single	Holiday Single	Tera	Merlion Music
"Ugnayan"	2023	Non-album single	Single	Dean (Dean Villareal), Joshuel Bautista, Telly Tanan	Merlion Music

Original soundtrack (OST) appearances
Title	Year	Other artist(s)	Notes	Composer	Label
"MAKA"	2024	Zephanie, Dylan Menor, Marco Masa, Ashley Sarmiento, Chanty, Sean Lucas, John Clifford	Maka OST	Natasha L. Correos	GMA Playlist
"Makakaya"	2024	Zephanie, Dylan Menor, Marco Masa, Ashley Sarmiento, Chanty, Sean Lucas, John Clifford	Maka OST	Ann Margaret R. Figueroa	GMA Playlist
"Gugma"	2024	John Clifford	Maka OST Vol. 3	Rina May L. Mercado	GMA Playlist
"This is Our Time"	2026	Zephanie, Naya Ambi, Gaea Mischa, Mitzi Josh	Born to Shine OST	Kenneth Job R. Reodica	GMA Playlist
"Runaway"	2026	Chloe Redondo, Angelika Santiago, Aaliyah de Gracia	Born to Shine OST EP	Rina May L. Mercado	GMA Playlist
"Darling"	2026	Chloe Redondo, Angelika Santiago, Aaliyah de Gracia	Born to Shine Vol. 2 EP	Kaya Martina K. Katigbak	GMA Playlist
"Ikaw Ang Dahilan"	2026	Zephanie, Naya Ambi, Gaea Mischa, Mitzi Josh	Born to Shine Vol. 2 EP	Kenneth Job R. Reodica	GMA Playlist

== Accolades ==
Awards and NominationsAwards and nominations received by Olive May
Award	Year	Category	Nominated work	Result	Ref.
8th Philippine POP P-POP Awards	2023	Philippine Pop Top Female Visual of the Year	—N/a	Won	
RAWR Awards X and SILOG Awards	2026	Favorite Kontrabida	Born to Shine	Won	
