= Outrage Magazine =

LGBT digital magazine in the Philippines

Outrage Magazine is the only lesbian, gay, bisexual and transgender (LGBT) webzine in the Philippines. Headquartered in Makati City, it was launched in April 2007, focusing on LGBT-related stories in the Philippines, with most articles written by LGBT Filipinos.

Listed in the Global Forum on MSM & HIV (MSMGF), Outrage Magazine was founded by Michael David C. Tan, a Bachelor of Arts (Communication Studies) graduate of the University of Newcastle in New South Wales, Australia, who now serves as its chief editor. Tan won the 2006 Catholic Mass Media Awards for Best Investigative Report.

In March 2012, the magazine partnered with Rainbow Rights to develop a training program for the Deaf LGBT members of Deaf Rainbow Philippines.

The publication also holds LGBT-related events, e.g. festivals, exhibits, et cetera.

The magazine has also partnered with Bahaghari Center for LGBT Research, Education and Advocacy for the “I dare to care about equality” campaign, which formed part of the celebration of the International Day Against Homophobia and Transphobia (IDAHO) 2012. The campaign was supported by TV personalities Boy Abunda and Atty. Adel Tamano, veteran journalist Cheche Lazaro, Sen. Chiz Escudero, actress Angel Aquino, and rugby player Jon Morales.
