= John Clifford (Filipino actor) =

Filipino actor and model (born 2009)

- Born: John Clifford Pacaña Gawchua; July 7, 2006 (age 20); Cebu City, Philippines
- Other name: Clifford Gaw
- Occupations: actor; model
- Years active: 2023–present
- Agent: Sparkle GMA Artist Center (2023–present)
- Height: 1.676 m (5 ft 6 in)
- Website: Official website

John Clifford Pacaña Gawchua (born July 7, 2006), known professionally as John Clifford, is a Filipino actor and model.

== Early and personal life ==
Clifford was born on July 7, 2009, in Cebu City, Philippines, the fourth of five siblings and the only boy. His parents are Rufino and Sofia Gawchua.

At 6 years old, Clifford started as a commercial and print ad model. Clifford almost joined showbiz as a child actor under Star Magic, after being offered a contract by Johnny Manahan following his participation in the Promil I-Shine Talent Camp. But traveling back and forth from Cebu to Manila for projects wasn't feasible at the time.

Aside from acting, Clifford can also sing, dance, play guitar, and love performing on stage. He also has an athletic side; he loves playing basketball and knows how to play football. During the pandemic, he got into biking, through which he lost 15 kilos. He also enjoys playing online video games.

In 2025, Clifford graduated from senior high school at Maria Montessori International School in Cebu, where he took the Humanities and Social Sciences strand.

== Career ==
Clifford auditioned for GMA Sparkle in 2021, and in 2023 Clifford was officially introduced as part of GMA Network's Sparkle Teens. He made his acting debut in Pepito Manaloto: Tuloy ang Kuwento as Jacob; for his performance he was awarded the PMPC Star Award for Best New Male TV Personality at the 37th PMPC Star Awards for Television.

In 2025, Clifford was one of the 20 official housemates of Pinoy Big Brother: Celebrity Collab Edition 2.0 and dubbed as the "Dutiful Langga ng Cebu" and was later evicted together with Fred Moser on the 5th eviction night; Clifford got only 24.17% of the total public votes.

== Filmography ==
Key
†	Denotes films that have not yet been released

=== Television ===
Year	Title	Role	Notes	Ref.
2023 - Present	All-Out Sundays	Himself (Performer)		
2023	Battle of the Judges	Himself (Guest)		
2023	Sarap, 'Di Ba?	Himself (Guest)		
2023 - Present	The Bobay and Tekla Show	Himself (Guest)	Various Episodes	
2023 - Present	TiktoClock	Himself (Guest)	Various Episodes	
2023 - Present	Family Feud Philippines	Himself (Celebrity Player)	Various Episodes	
2023	Royal Blood	Young Eduardo Royales	Uncredited	
2023 - 2025	Pepito Manaloto: Tuloy ang Kuwento	Jacob		
2024	Magpakailanman	Young Henry	Episode: "Reyna ng bubog"	
2024	The Clash	Himself (Video Greeting)		
2024	Regal Studio Presents	Riel	Episode: "Mannequin Love"	
2024	Regal Studio Presents	Twinkle / Michael	Episode: "Three Sisters and a Jowa"	
2024 - 2025	Maka	JC Serrano		
2025	Lolong: Bayani ng Bayan	Ricky		
2025	Amazing Earth	Himself (Guest)		
2025	Lilet Matias: Attorney-at-Law	Ely		
2025	Maka Lovestream	Jerick	Episode: "Manifestations"	
2025	Maka Lovestream	Yago	Episode: "Ride to Forever"	
2025	Maka Lovestream	Jeric	Episode: "Secret Crush"	
2025	Maka Lovestream	Kimboy	Episode: "Last Christmas"	
2025	Pinoy Big Brother: Celebrity Collab Edition 2.0	Himself (Housemate)	Regular Housemate	
2026	Fast Talk with Boy Abunda	Himself (Guest)	Various Episodes	
2026	Its Showtime	Himself (Guest)		
2026	You're My Favorite Song	Calix Arcilla		
2026–2027	A Million Dreams	Jerome		

== Accolades ==
Awards and NominationsAwards and nominations received by Clifford Gaw
Award	Year	Category	Nominated work	Result	Ref.
Philippine Outstanding Men & Women Awards	2023	Outstanding Youth of the Philippines	—N/a	Honored	
37th PMPC Star Awards for Television	2025	Best New Male TV Personality	Pepito Manaloto: Tuloy ang Kuwento	Won	
7th Global Trends Business Leaders Awards	2026	Rising Male Star	—N/a	Won	
