= Petite (comedian) =

Filipino actor, comedian and singer

- Born: Vincent Aycocho; Legazpi, Albay, Philippines
- Notable work: Yaya Git, Petite, Comedy Bar

Comedy career
- Years active: 2008–present
- Medium: Actor, TV show host, comedian

Vincent Aycocho, known professionally as Petite, is a Filipino actor, comedian, singer and TV show host. Prior to his television stints, Petite has been known for as a comedian performing in local comedy bars such as the defunct Punchline and Klownz, together with their other celebrities Boobay, Iyah, Donita Nose, Ate Gay, Allan K. and Wally Bayola. Petite had more projects on GMA Network, such as hosting CelebriTV, which was co-hosted with Joey de Leon. Petite's biography was shown in GMA 7's Magpakailanman aired on March 6, 2021.

== Career ==
After in comedy bar Petite has a numerous shows in GMA Network. Petite signed a contract on GMA Network in 2014 as an actor and comedian, Petite guesting in CelebriTV, and joining the Bulaga Pa More! in Eat Bulaga! as a performer, Sunday PinaSaya guesting in Kalyeserye as an applicant role and in Vampire ang Daddy Ko as special guest. Petite also guested in the longest-running gag show in the Philippines, Bubble Gang and Calle Siete.

Comedy Bar

Petite is a singer and performer in a Philippine TV comedian series Comedy Bar, hosting Boobay, Fabio Ide and others, he is a best notable work in Comedy Bar before CelebriTV.

Kalyeserye

Petite is one of the cast in Kalyeserye as the applicant of Lola in Kalyeserye as Yaya Git before he appear in Eat Bulaga! on his role who has difficulty raising both arms saying raise the roof; together with Yaya-in, Yaya Glo and Yaya Pak. After Kalyeserye, Petite appearing extended cast by his role in Vampire ang Daddy Ko, with Iyah.

== Filmography ==
=== Film ===
Year	Title	Role
2009	Love on Line (LOL)	Red Gross
2009	Ang Darling Kong Aswang	Pasiyonista 1
2017	Mang Kepweng Returns	Petite
2018	Mamu: and a Mother Too	Petite
2019	The Mall, The Merrier	Casim
2020	Mang Kepweng: Ang Lihim ng Bandanang Itim	Petite
2021	Ayuda Babes	Lily
2021	Ang Babaeng Walang Pakiramdam	Au
2023	Broken Hearts Trip	a contestant
2024	And the Breadwinner Is...	Mikha

=== Television ===
Year	Title	Role
2008	Comedy Bar	Himself / Performer
2015	CelebriTV	Himself / Host
2015	Sunday PinaSaya	Himself / Guests
2016	Eat Bulaga!	Himself / Performer
2016	Kalyeserye	Yaya Git
2016	Vampire ang Daddy Ko	Petite
2016	Bubble Gang: Pool Senorita	Himself / fake Pool Senorita
2016	Calle Siete	Smokey
2017	Wish Ko Lang: Leevan	Mama Dodong
2018	My Guitar Princess	Whitney
2018–2019	Wowowin	Himself / Co-hosts
2020	Gandang Gabi, Vice!	Himself / Host
2023	Everybody, Sing! (season 3)	Guest (episodes 1-29; 37)
2023	It's Your Lucky Day	Co-host / Guest
2023–present	It's Showtime	Co-host / Guest

== See also ==
- Boobay
- Jose Manalo
- Wally Bayola
- Ate Gay
