= List of My Super D episodes =

My Super D is a 2016 Philippine superhero fantasy drama television series directed by Frasco Mortiz and Lino Cayetano, starring Dominic Ochoa, Marco Masa and Bianca Manalo. The series premiered on ABS-CBN's Primetime Bida evening block and worldwide on The Filipino Channel on April 18, 2016, to July 15, 2016, replacing My Love Donna on April 8, 2016, and Game ng Bayan on April 15, 2016. This is Dominic Ochoa's very first lead role after playing supporting roles in numerous teleseryes.

== List of episodes ==
Episode No.	Title	Twitter Hashtag	Date Aired
1	Adventure Begins	#MySuperDAdventureBegins	April 18, 2016
2	My Super D Vs Zulueta	#MySuperDVsZulueta	April 19, 2016
3	Nasaan Ka	#MySuperDNasaanKa	April 20, 2016
4	Strong Dodong	#MySuperDStrongDodong	April 21, 2016
5	Dodong At Dennis	#MySuperDDodongAtDennis	April 22, 2016
6	Tony Setup	#MySuperDTonySetup	April 25, 2016
7	Finding Dennis	#MySuperDFindingDennis	April 26, 2016
8	Dodong Laya Na	#MySuperDDodongLayaNa	April 27, 2016
9	Kidnap	#MySuperDKidnap	April 28, 2016
10	Dennis In Trouble	#MySuperDDennisInTrouble	April 29, 2016
11	Finding D Blue Gem	#MySuperDFindingDBlueGem	May 2, 2016
12	Super D Is Back	#MySuperDIsBack	May 3, 2016
13	Reluctant Hero	#MySuperDReluctantHero	May 4, 2016
14	Decisions	#MySuperDDecisions	May 5, 2016
15	Hero Heart	#MySuperDHeroHeart	May 6, 2016
16	Help Us	#MySuperDHelpUs	May 10, 2016
17	Handa Na	#MySuperDHandaNa	May 11, 2016
18	Duda	#MySuperDDuda	May 12, 2016
19	High Na High	#MySuperDHighNaHigh	May 13, 2016
20	Sidekick	#MySuperDSidekick	May 16, 2016
21	Paghaharap	#MySuperDPaghaharap	May 17, 2016
22	Panunuyo	#MySuperDPanunuyo	May 18, 2016
23	Frustrations	#MySuperDFrustrations	May 19, 2016
24	Laban	#MySuperDLaban	May 20, 2016
25	Hawig	#MySuperDHawig	May 23, 2016
26	Tampo	#MySuperDTampo	May 24, 2016
27	Salisi	#MySuperDSalisi	May 25, 2016
28	Detective Dennis	#MySuperDDetectiveDennis	May 26, 2016
29	Buking	#MySuperDBuking	May 27, 2016
30	Anak Ni Zulueta	#MySuperDAnakNiZulueta	May 30, 2016
31	Super D Meets Ulah	#MySuperDMeetsUlah	May 31, 2016
32	Villain Tiradora	#MySuperDVillianTiradora	June 1, 2016
33	Super D Vs Tiradora	#MySuperDVsTiradora	June 2, 2016
34	Banta	#MySuperDBanta	June 3, 2016
35	Hero Duties	#MySuperDHeroDuties	June 6, 2016
36	Tiwala	#MySuperDTiwala	June 7, 2016
37	Pagtutuos	#MySuperDPagtutuos	June 8, 2016
38	Discover	#MySuperDDiscover	June 9, 2016
39	Negastar	#MySuperDNegastar	June 10, 2016
40	Walang Tiwala	#MySuperDWalangTiwala	June 13, 2016
41	Paghahanda	#MySuperDPaghahanda	June 14, 2016
42	Ebidensya	#MySuperDEbidensya	June 15, 2016
43	Tuklas	#MySuperDTuklas	June 16, 2016
44	Father's Day	#MySuperDFathersDay	June 17, 2016
45	Red Gem	#MySuperDRedGem	June 20, 2016
46	Heneral Zulu	#MySuperDHeneralZulu	June 21, 2016
47	Sagupaan	#MySuperDSagupaan	June 22, 2016
48	Heros Secret	#MySuperDHerosSecret	June 23, 2016
49	Zulus Heir	#MySuperDZulusHeir	June 24, 2016
50	Jealous Tony	#MySuperDJealousTony	June 27, 2016
51	Traydor	#MySuperDTraydor	June 28, 2016
52	Second Chance	#MySuperDSecondChance	June 29, 2016
53	Zulu 2	#MySuperDZulu2	June 30, 2016
54	Frame Up	#MySuperDFrameUp	July 1, 2016
55	Linlang	#MySuperDLinlang	July 4, 2016
56	Zulu Battle	#MySuperDZuluBattle	July 5, 2016
57	Pabuya	#MySuperDPabuya	July 6, 2016
58	BillBilly	#MySuperDBillBilly	July 7, 2016
59	My Super Dennis	#MySuperDennis	July 8, 2016
60	Last 5	#MySuperDLast5	July 11, 2016
61	Last 4	#MySuperDLast4	July 12, 2016
62	Last 3	#MySuperDLast3	July 13, 2016
63	Last 2	#MySuperDLast2	July 14, 2016
64	D' End	#MySuperDEnd	July 15, 2016
