= Gardo Versoza =

Filipino actor (born 1969)

- Born: Mennen Torres Polintan; July 8, 1969 (age 56); Antipolo, Rizal, Philippines
- Other name: Cupcake
- Occupations: Actor; Comedian; Film producer
- Years active: 1988–present
- Children: 1

Mennen Torres Polintan (born July 8, 1969), known professionally as Gardo Versoza, is a Filipino actor and comedian. He is known for playing David in Machete 2: Pure Awesomeness (1994) and Cobrador in Bolera (2022).

== Career ==
Versoza's film career began in 1988 when his mentor, Carlo Finioni, cast him in the drama film Hamunin ang Bukas. Early in his career, he used the screen name Niño Espedilla and appeared in films such as Sabik sa Halik, Machete II, Halimuyak ng Babae, and Kirot.

Versoza appeared in action movies, including roles in Cesar Climaco, Mison, and Ka Hector. He has also portrayed historical figures in several films, including José Rizal (1998), in which he played Andres Bonifacio, and Sisa, where he played Jose Rizal / Pepe. His television credits include Domingo in Mula sa Puso, Camilo San Carlos in It Might Be You, and Apo Abukay in Sugo.

Versoza has made guest appearances on various shows on ABS-CBN and the GMA Network, including Bubble Gang, Maalaala Mo Kaya, Hokus Pokus, and Magpakailanman. In 2019, he portrayed policemen Ulysses Balthazar in the Sandugo series and drug dealer Lazaro Enriquez in the FPJ's Ang Probinsyano series. Both series aired on ABS-CBN.

In early 2016, he adopted the nickname "Cupcake".

== Personal life ==
Versoza married his girlfriend in 2019.

== Filmography ==
=== Film ===
Year	Title	Role	Notes
1988	Hamunin ang Bukas...		
1991	Onyong Majikero	George	
1991	Ubos Na ang Luha Ko	Nando	
1991	Zaldong Tisoy		
1991	Ilalaban Kita ng Patayan	Val Saldivia	
1992	Lumayo Ka Man sa Akin		
1992	Sana Kahit Minsan	Tony	
1992	Paminsan-minsan		
1992	Stella Magtangol		
1992	Nang Gabing Mamulat si Eba (Jennifer Segovia Story)		
1993	Taong Gubat		
1993	Isang Linggong Pag-ibig		
1993	Kumusta Ka Aking Mahal		
1993	Ayaw Ko ng Nangarap	Edward	
1993	Isang Linggong Pag-Ibig		
1994	Bawal Na Gamot	Jimbo	
1994	Machete 2: Pure Awesomeness	David	
1994	Sana'y Laging Magkapiling		
1995	Ka Hector		
1995	Kandugan		
1995	Kirot 2	Dino	
1995	Sabik sa Halik	Rico	
1996	Halimuyak ng Babae		
1996	Medrano	David Medrano	
1996	Kristo	Gestas	
1997	Emong Salvacion: Humanda Ka, Oras Mo Na	Rocky	
1997	Mabango		
1997	The Mariano Mison Story	Dennis	
1998	Ang Lalaki sa Buhay ni Selya	Bobby	
1998	Kid Manalo: Akin ang Ulo Mo!		
1998	Bawal		
1998	Kargado	Frido	
1998	Notoryus	SPO1 Dalisay (as Police Syndicate)	
1998	Jose Rizal	Andrés Bonifacio	
1999	Mula sa Puso: The Movie	Domingo (cameo)	
1999	Sisa	José Rizal a.k.a. Pepe	
1999	Ang Kabit ni Mrs. Montero		
1999	Sindak	Raul	
1999	Sa Piling ng Aswang		
2000	Huwag Mong Ubusin ang Bait Ko!	Franco Valero	
2001	Aagos ang Dugo	Gino	
2002	Kailangan Kita		
2002	Biyahera		
2003	Kiskisan	Marvin	
2003	Bigay Hilig		
2003	Kerida		
2003	Woman of Breakwater	Dave Pilay	
2004	Animal (originally titled Butakal: Sugapa sa Laman)	Ferdie	
2004	Mano Po III: My Love		
2005	Pinoy Blonde		
2006	First Day High	Rene Samartino	
2007	The Bicycle		
2007	Gulong		
2009	Prinsipe Sabong		
2009	Astig		
2012	MNL 143		
2012	Bwakaw	Father Eddie	
2012	Sisterakas	Husband of Bernadette	
2014	Sundalong Kanin		
2014	Hustisya	Gardo	
2015	The Prenup	Agaton Cayabyab	
2018	Wander Bra	Amado	
2021	Ayuda Babes	Kapitana	
2023	Third World Romance		
2024	Balota	Giancarlo Edraline	

=== Online series ===
Year	Title	Role
2020	The House Arrest of Us	Rudy "Papawan" de Guzman

=== Television ===
Year	Title	Role
1995	Bayani	Diego Silang
1997–1999	Mula sa Puso	Domingo
2001–2002	Biglang Sibol, Bayang Impasibol	Carlos Herrero
2002–2003	Kung Mawawala Ka	Edmund Amparo
2002–2003	Bituin	Diony
2003	Wansapanatym: "Dwendeng Bahay"	
2003–2004	It Might Be You	Camillo San Carlos
2005	Ang Mahiwagang Baul: "Kung Bakit May Korona ang Bayabas"	Mura-On
2005–2006	Sugo	Apo Abukay
2006–2007	Atlantika	Haring Agat
2006	Ang Kasagutan	
2006–2007	Komiks Presents: Da Adventures of Pedro Penduko	Kapitan Carling Ambing
2007	Komiks Presents: Pedro Penduko at ang Mga Engkantao	Nanding
2007	Asian Treasures	Socrates
2007	Sine Novela Presents: Kung Mahawi Man ang Ulap	Pablo Acuesta
2007	Ysabella	Young Perry Mendoza
2007–2008	Carlo J. Caparas' Kamandag	King Saban
2008	Sine Novela Presents: Magdusa Ka	Bernardo Doliente
2008	I Am KC: Time's Up!	Mang Nolan
2008	Maalaala Mo Kaya: Basura"	Jojo
2008–2009	Luna Mystika	Dante / Sikano
2009	Sugat ng Kahapon	Aldo
2009–2010	May Bukas Pa	Gary
2009–2010	Katorse	Don Anselmo Arcangel
2010	Rubi	Arturo Dela Fuente
2010	Your Song Presents: Isla	Mario
2010	The Celebrity Cook-Off	Himself / Host
2010	Maalaala Mo Kaya: "Rosas"	Nestor
2010	Untold Stories Mula sa Face to Face	Various Roles
2010	Wansapanataym: "Zoila's Valentina"	Luis Veneracion
2011	Agimat: Ang Mga Alamat ni Ramon Revilla: Bianong Bulag	Ernesto Gutierrez
2011	Green Rose	David Tobias
2011	Maalaala Mo Kaya: "TV"	George Habijan
2011–2012	Amaya	Rajah Mangubat
2011–2012	Ikaw Lang ang Mamahalin	Ferdinand Fuentebella
2012	Maalaala Mo Kaya: "Singsing"	Piding
2012	Hiram na Puso	Leonardo "Leo" Saavedra
2012	Felina: Prinsesa ng mga Pusa	Arvin
2012–2013	Aso ni San Roque	Kanlaon
2013	Never Say Goodbye	Dindo Carpio
2013	Mga Basang Sisiw	Efren Rodrigo
2013	Titser	Sir Gil
2013	Genesis	Ka Andoy
2014	Rhodora X	Derick Ferrer
2014	Dading	Alfredo "Mother Lexi" Ignacio
2014	Magpakailanman: "Ang Inang Yaya"	Aniseto
2014–2015	More Than Words	Victor Balboa
2015	Magpakailanman: "Love After the Storm"	Joel
2015	Let the Love Begin	Antonio "Tony" Sta. Maria / DJ Tony
2015–2016	The Half Sisters	Santiago "Santi" Abarrientos III
2016	Ismol Family	Sampaguita
2016	The Story of Us	Ferdinand "Ferdie" Sandoval Sr.
2016	Juan Happy Love Story	Rodrigo "Bayong" Villanueva
2016	A1 Ko Sa 'Yo	Rolly Molina
2017	Destined to be Yours	Teddy Obispo
2017	Tsuperhero	Apo Amasam
2017	Hay, Bahay!	Bernie Versace
2017	D' Originals	Greg "Chef Logo" Buenaventura
2017	Wish Ko Lang: "Sa Kuweba ng Buhay"	Lito
2017	Kambal, Karibal	Noli Bautista
2018	Sirkus	Leviticus / Levi
2018	Magpakailanman: "Our Crazy Love"	Rommel
2018	Magpakailanman: "Takbo ng Buhay Ko"	Acleng
2018	Dear Uge: "Nosi Balae"	Izzy
2018	Magpakailanman: "Yuki - A Japinay Story"	Monching
2018–2019	Onanay	Dante Dimagiba
2019	FPJ's Ang Probinsyano	Lazaro Enriquez
2019–2020	Sandugo	Ulysses Balthazar
2021	First Yaya	Luis Prado
2021	Magpakailanman: "Batang Madrasta"	Dan
2021	Magpakailanman: "A Girl Named Hipon"	Ibhe
2022	Agimat ng Agila	Zeus Limjoco
2022	Bolera	Marco "Cobrador" Alcantara
2022	Flower of Evil	Abel Villareal
2022	Magpakailanman: "I Bear for You"	Miguel
2023	The Write One	The President
2023–2024	Jack & Jill sa Diamond Hills	Bobby G
2024	Pira-Pirasong Paraiso	Daniel Paraiso
2024–2025	Lumuhod Ka Sa Lupa	Benito Balmores
2024	Lavender Fields	Andres Flores
2025	Saving Grace	Antonio Sarmiento
2025	Incognito	Monching Santiago
2026	The Secrets of Hotel 88	Michael Fernandez
