= Comedy Bar =

Comedy Bar may refer to:

- a general synonym for a comedy club
- Comedy Bar (Toronto), a comedy club in Toronto, Ontario, Canada, and a 2010s comedy web series produced by the Toronto club
- Comedy Bar (Philippine TV program), a 2010s Philippine comedy and variety television series
