= Negi (comedian) =

Filipino comedian and actor (born 1979)

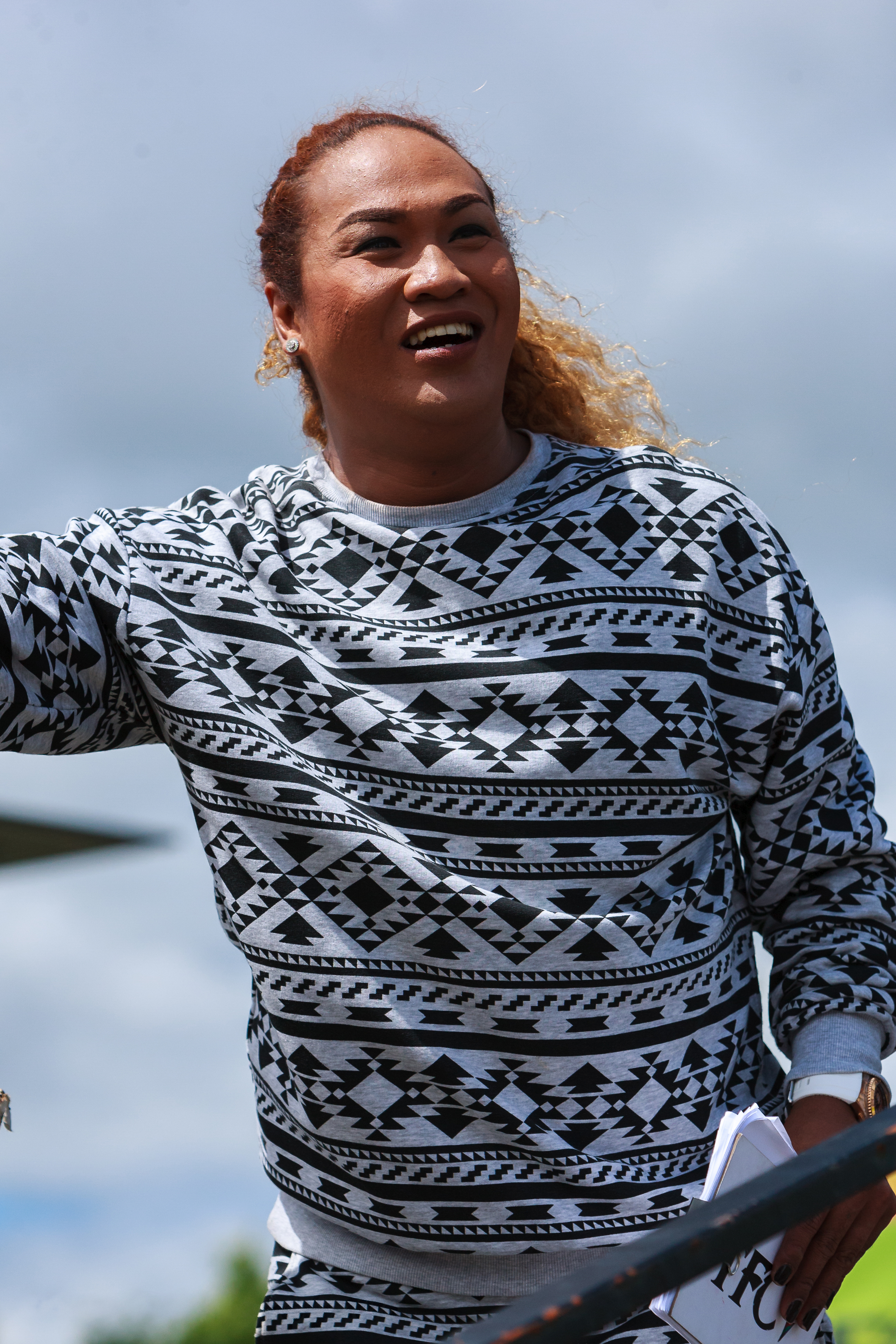

Member of the North Bay Boulevard North Barangay Council
- Incumbent
- Assumed office 20 November 2023

Personal details
- Born: Uldario Molina Flores Jr. December 5, 1979 (age 46) Navotas, Philippines
- Occupation: Actor, stand-up comedian
- Other names: Negi; Ate Negi; Kagawad Negi; Dantoy
- Years active: 2011–present
- Agent: Star Magic (2011–present)

Uldario Molina Jr., popularly known by his stage name Negi, is a Filipino stand-up comedian, actor and politician. He appeared on Gandang Gabi, Vice! as Vice Ganda's side kick. He appeared in various TV shows of ABS-CBN such as Minute to Win It, Gandang Gabi, Vice!, Game ng Bayan, It's Showtime, Kapamilya, Deal or No Deal, I Can See Your Voice, It's Your Lucky Day, Rainbow Rumble, and FPJ's Batang Quiapo, and films such as Kimmy Dora and the Temple of Kiyeme, Sisterakas, Echorsis, Super Parental Guardians, Finally Found Someone, Kusina Kings, Wander Bra, Familia Blondina, and Ayuda Babes.

== Filmography ==
=== Film ===
Year	Title	Role
2012	Kimmy Dora and the Temple of Kiyeme	Charito's Uncle
2012	Sisterakas	Snow White
2016	Echorsis	Negi Negra
2016	Super Parental Guardians	Clumsy Binay
2017	Finally Found Someone	Alfaro
2018	Kusina Kings	Chef Mufasa Tangnamerz
2018	Wander Bra	Talent Show Host
2019	Familia Blondina	Brando Mailksi
2021	Ayuda Babes	Alma
2024	And the Breadwinner Is...	Gwen
2024	One Day League: Dead Mother, Dead All	Brenda

=== Television ===
- Gandang Gabi, Vice! (2011–2020) - Vice Ganda's sidekick
- Kapamilya, Deal or No Deal (2015–2016, 2026–present) - Contestant - Briefcase number 2, Lucky Stars - Briefcase number 6, 7, 13 and 16
- Game ng Bayan (2016)
- Minute to Win It (2017–2019) - Contestant (2017)/Co-host (2019)
- I Can See Your Voice (2021–2024) - SING-vestigator
- PIEnalo Pinoy Games/PIEnalo (2022–2023) - Co-host
- The SPG Show: Saktong Pang-gabi (2023) - Host
- Mukhang Perya (2023) - Co-Host
- It's Your Lucky Day (2023) - Co-host
- Rainbow Rumble (2024–2026) - Co-host
- It's Showtime (2024–present) - Guest host/Hurado
- FPJ's Batang Quiapo (2025) - Aloha
