= Katawan =

Philippine thriller drama film

- Official movie poster
- Directed by: Abbo dela Cruz
- Screenplay by: Uro dela Cruz
- Story by: Uro dela Cruz; Tito Molina; Rosanna Roces
- Produced by: Vincent del Rosario III; Veronique del Rosario-Corpus
- Starring: Christopher de Leon; Rosanna Roces
- Cinematography: Charlie Peralta
- Edited by: Ferren Salumbides
- Music by: Jaime Fabregas
- Production company: Neo Films
- Distributed by: Neo Films
- Release date: March 10, 1999
- Running time: 95 minutes
- Country: Philippines
- Language: Filipino

Katawan is a 1999 Philippine thriller drama film directed by Abbo dela Cruz. The film stars Christopher de Leon and Rosanna Roces, who co-wrote the story. This is the last film produced by Neo Films before being absorbed into its parent company Viva Films.

== Synopsis ==
Carlo believes that a generational curse has been passed down to him from his grandfather and his father which has deeply affected his family. The moment the doctor confirms of his wife pregnancy, Carlo fears that the curse has taken effect. He returns to his family's villa in Lucban where he meets Carmen, a mysterious woman who is destined to kill him.

== Cast ==
Main cast

- Christopher de Leon as Carlo
- Rosanna Roces as Carmen

Supporting cast

- Bobby Andrews as Andres
- Leandro Baldemor as David
- Dindi Gallardo as Jackie
- Daniella as Delia
- Alicia Lane as Lagring
- Alicia Alonzo as Hermana Tuding
- Tony Mabesa as Don Villaverde
- Lora Luna as Donya Francesca
- Ama Quiambao as Inang Chayong
- Dante Castro as Contractor
- Jessel Jimenez as Delia's Lover
- Archie Ventosa as Dr. Froi
- Abbo dela Cruz as Clerk
- Jun Cudia as Gasoline Boy
