= The Man in Selya's Life =

1998 drama film by Carlos Siguion-Reyna

- VCD cover of the film
- Directed by: Carlos Siguion-Reyna
- Written by: Bibeth Orteza
- Produced by: Armida Siguion-Reyna; Charo Santos-Concio; Malou N. Santos
- Starring: Rosanna Roces; Ricky Davao; Gardo Versoza
- Cinematography: Yam Laranas
- Edited by: Manet A. Dayrit
- Music by: Ryan Cayabyab
- Production companies: Reyna Films; Star Pacific Cinema
- Distributed by: Star Pacific Cinema
- Release dates: September 7, 1997 (TIFF); February 11, 1998 (Philippines)
- Running time: 96 minutes
- Country: Philippines
- Language: Filipino

The Man in Selya's Life (Filipino: Ang Lalaki sa Buhay ni Selya) is a 1997 controversial Filipino drama film directed by Carlos Siguion-Reyna and written by his wife, Bibeth Orteza. Starring Rosanna Roces, Ricky Davao, and Gardo Versoza, the story follows a woman who confronts her own prejudice among the community of intolerant, bigoted, and homophobic gossipers when she chooses between two men: a high school principal who is a closeted gay man and a man who wants more commitment with her. It is the second and last film of Rosanna Roces with Reyna Films and one of the films directed by Carlos Siguion-Reyna that bravely features taboo topics in Philippine cinema.

A co-production of Reyna Films and Star Cinema, via its Star Pacific Cinema label, it is the first film produced by the latter entity where its story and themes are aimed at adult audiences. It was first premiered overseas in Canada on September 7, 1997, at the 22nd Toronto International Film Festival, exhibited under the "Contemporary World Cinema" section, before it received a domestic commercial release. on February 11, 1998. Since then, it became a blockbuster and received accolades from international film festivals and controversy from the censors.

In 2015, the film was digitally restored and remastered by ABS-CBN Film Restoration.

== Synopsis ==
The story revolves around Selya, a schoolteacher. She wants more commitment from Bobby, with whom she has a sexual relationship, but Bobby refuses to give her what she wants, and he leaves her.

Selya runs away and ends up in a little town where she meets Piling, who is also a schoolteacher, and Ramon, a closeted gay man. The townspeople are homophobic, and she begins to hear vicious criticisms and unbridled gossip as she embarks on a relationship with Ramon. Selya realizes that things won't end well as Ramon does not want a sexual relationship with her, and she walks out on Ramon even as he proposes to her.

Selya returns to Bobby, only to regret her decision when he gets her pregnant and still doesn't change. Selya then decides to return to Ramon and raise her child with him. Eventually, she becomes happy with her decision to live in a civil union with Ramon, though their relationship remains platonic, and Selya realizes her worth as a woman.

In the end, as Bobby tries to take her and their child away from Ramon, Selya confronts her own irony, daringly exhibiting her strength of character as she conquers her physical desires and chooses the more emotionally rewarding bond.

== Cast ==
Main cast

- Rosanna Roces as Selya de Castro
- Ricky Davao as Ramon Torres
- Gardo Versoza as Bobby

Supporting cast

- Allan Paule as Ricardo "Carding" Santos
- Eva Darren as Piling
- Crispin Pineda as Imo
- Gigi Locsin as Belen
- Cednic Millado as Abet
- Macky Villalon as Diday
- John Nielsen Apilado as Ramoncito
- Renato del Prado as Ambo
- Virgie Lopez as Diding

== Reception ==
=== Controversy ===
The scene where two men are having intercourse was deemed "offensive" by the censor board, who initially gave an X rating before they reconsider it.

=== Accolades ===
Award-giving organization	Date	Category	Recipient(s)	Result	Ref.
48th Berlin International Film Festival	February 21, 1998	Teddy Award - Jury Prize	The Man in Selya's Life; Directed by Carlos Siguion-Reyna	Won	
Newport Beach International Film Festival	April 2, 1998	Best Asian Film	The Man in Selya's Life; Directed by Carlos Siguion-Reyna	Won	
13th Turin International Gay & Lesbian Film Festival	April 21, 1998	Special Jury Award - Feature Competition	The Man in Selya's Life; Directed by Carlos Siguion-Reyna	Won	
47th FAMAS Awards	April 8, 1999	Best Actress	Rosanna Roces	Nominated	
47th FAMAS Awards	April 8, 1999	Best Child Actor	John Nielson Apilado	Nominated	
