= Zorayda Sanchez =

Filipino comedian and film scriptwriter

- Born: Zorayda T. Sanchez; June 28, 1951; Angono, Rizal, Philippines
- Died: August 27, 2008 (aged 57); Angono, Rizal, Philippines
- Other name: Zora
- Occupations: Actress, comedian and scriptwriter
- Years active: 1982–2008

Zorayda Sanchez (June 28, 1951 – August 27, 2008) was a Filipino comedian, actress, television and film scriptwriter.

== Personal life ==
She was a single mother with one daughter, Alexis Joyce whom she had with actor Dax Rivera.

== Education ==
She graduated cum laude from the University of Santo Tomas with a degree in Journalism.

== Career ==
Sanchez began writing scripts for radio drama programs on DZRH shortly after graduating from university.

Sanchez was a regular fixture of comedy films in the 1980s. She was also cast on the 1980s hit gag show Goin' Bananas, together with Christopher de Leon, Edgar Mortiz, Johnny Delgado and Jay Ilagan.

== Death ==
Sanchez died of breast cancer on August 27, 2008. She was 57. She is interred in Angono, Rizal.

== Filmography ==
=== Film ===
Year	Title	Role
1982	Broken Marriage	
1983	Bagets	Chertit
1984	Working Girls	
1984	Bagets 2	Chertit
1985	Kapag Puso'y Sinugatan	
1986	Send in the Clowns	
1987	Shoot That Ball	
1987	Maria Went to Town	Saraya
1987	Ready!.. Aim!.. Fire!..	
1987	Binibining Tsuperman	
1987	Takot Ako, Eh!	
1988	Stupid Cupid	Bubbles ("Horror Honeymoon" segment)
1988	Petrang Kabayo at ang Pilyang Kuting	Silveria
1988	Tiyanak	Telyang Bayawak
1988	Hamunin ang Bukas...	
1988	Bakit Kinagat ni Adan ang Mansanas ni Eba?	
1990	Papa's Girl	
1990	Crocodile Jones: The Son of Indiana Dundee	
1990	Feel Na Feel	
1990	Petrang Kabayo 2: Anong Ganda Mo! Mukha Kang Kabayo	Silveria
1991	Humanap Ka ng Panget	Luningning
1991	Anak ni Janice	
1992	Alabang Girls	Irene
1994	Syempre, Ikaw Lang Ang Syota Kong Imported	Hotel guest
2008	Tiltil	Tale
