= Ayuda Babes =

2021 Filipino comedy film directed by Joven Tan

Ayuda babes
- Official release poster
- Directed by: Joven Tan
- Screenplay by: Ferdie Aboga; Joven Tan
- Story by: Joven Tan
- Starring: Gardo Versoza; Ate Gay; Joey Paras; Negi; Juliana Pariscova Segovia; Brenda Mage; Iyah Mina
- Cinematography: Tejay Gonzales
- Edited by: Jason Cahapay
- Music by: Sherwin Castillo
- Production company: Saranggola Media Productions
- Distributed by: iWantTFC; KTX
- Release date: March 5, 2021
- Running time: 91 minutes
- Country: Philippines
- Languages: Filipino; Tagalog

Ayuda Babes is a 2021 Philippine comedy film directed by Joven Tan. It stars Gardo Versoza, Ate Gay, Joey Paras, Negi, Juliana Pariscova Segovia, Brenda Mage and Iyah Mina. The film is about what people doing in their community while having a COVID-19 pandemic in the Philippines.

== Plot ==
During the height of the COVID-19 lockdowns in a small Filipino barangay, Kapitana, the no-nonsense barangay captain, finds herself overwhelmed with the task of distributing ayuda, government aid meant to help residents struggling through quarantine. With limited supplies and long lists of needy families, she's under pressure from both the higher-ups and the community. Her sidekick, Mama Rita, is always by her side, gossiping loudly about every little thing that happens around them, turning everyday events into exaggerated tales that spread quickly through the neighborhood.

In the midst of all this, Pinky, the local salon owner, tries to keep her business alive despite the lockdown restrictions. She turns to social media to give free beauty tips and tutorials, hoping to keep her clients entertained, but her comedic missteps like accidentally using the wrong hair product on camera provide plenty of laughs for the community. Her small shop, though closed for business, remains the heart of neighborhood chatter, with neighbors sharing news and worries from behind windows or over the phone.

Meanwhile, Marie and Jun, a young couple living together during the quarantine, find their relationship tested by close quarters and the stress of isolation. Their daily routine includes awkward attempts at online dating games and frequent arguments about safety protocols, like whether to open windows or how often to sanitize, often ending in playful banter that highlights both their love and frustration.

Alma and Jean, two enterprising friends, bounce between schemes to make ends meet selling homemade disinfectants that don't quite work or setting up online shops for quirky products. Their efforts usually end in comedic disaster, like accidentally mixing the wrong ingredients or having their deliveries constantly delayed by the lockdown.

The whole barangay is a mix of characters, from Tinderang Masungit, the perpetually grumpy neighbor who's always complaining about noise and line-cutting, to Tet, the lively karaoke enthusiast whose singing contests become a much-needed source of joy and connection for everyone.

As Kapitana tries to manage the chaotic distribution of ayuda, a misunderstanding caused by Mama Rita's gossip escalates into a full-blown neighborhood drama when a resident is mistakenly accused of hoarding supplies. This sparks a hilarious investigation by the barangay folks, with mistaken identities and wild accusations flying everywhere.

Despite the confusion, the community comes together in small acts of kindness like sharing food, supporting each other's small businesses, and even organizing quarantine karaoke nights that lift everyone's spirits. Through these moments of laughter and connection, the film shows the resilience of a community bound not just by necessity, but by humor, compassion, and hope.

By the end of the lockdown period, though frustrations remain, the bonds between neighbors grow stronger, proving that even in the toughest times, a little ayuda and a lot of heart can go a long way.

== Cast ==
- Gardo Versoza as Kapitana
- Ate Gay as Tet
- Joey Paras as Mama Rita
- Negi as Alma
- Juliana Parizcova Segovia as Marie
- Brenda Mage as Jean
- Iyah Mina as Pinky
- Marlo Mortel as Jun
- Zeus Collins as Dave
- Marc Logan as Marc Logan (himself)
- Petite as Lily
- Christi Fider as Jenny
- Bernie Batin as Tinderang Masungit
- Dan Delgado as Jr
- Japh Bahian as Talent

== Release ==
The film was released in iWantTFC and Ktx.ph on March 5, 2021.

== Reception ==
JE CC of MSN rate the film 2 out of 5 and wrote:

‘Ayuda Babes’ suffers from a Lack of Sense and Direction.
