= Broken Hearts Trip =

- Theatrical release poster
- Directed by: Lemuel Lorca
- Written by: Archie del Mundo
- Story by: Lex Bonife
- Produced by: Benjie M Cabrera; Omar Tolentino
- Starring: Christian Bables
- Edited by: Noah Tonga; Roger Matthew N. Lorenzo
- Music by: Paolo Almaden
- Production companies: BMC Films; Smart Films
- Release date: December 25, 2023
- Running time: 112 minutes
- Country: Philippines
- Language: Filipino

Broken Hearts Trip is a 2023 Philippine comedy film starring Christian Bables, directed by Lemuel Lorca under BMC Films and Smart Films. The film revolves around a reality show where five LGBT participants, each of them seeking to move on from their past love lives, compete to win in the show's various trials.

Broken Hearts Trip is the last film appearance of Jaclyn Jose after she died on March 2, 2024.

== Premise ==
A gay man (Christian Bables), hosts The Broken Hearts Trip, a reality television show featuring five LGBT contestants (Teejay Marquez, Marvin Yap, Petite, Iyah Mina, and Andoy Ranay). The host is joined by two people who serve as his co-"judgers" (Tart Carlos and Jaclyn Jose). The five participants have one thing in common, they are brokenhearted, and are given a chance to heal from their bad experience through trips to various tourist destinations across the Philippines.

The five contestants must avoid falling in love. The last gay man or trans woman standing is promised to win a million pesos.

== Cast ==
- Christian Bables as the film's in-universe reality TV show host and a "judger"
- Teejay Marquez as a contestant who is also a celebrity.
- Marvin Yap as a contestant
- Petite as a contestant
- Iyah Mina as Bernie, a beauty queen who has never won a title and also a contestant of the reality TV show.
- Andoy Ranay as Alex, a contestant who is an advertising executive who found out his partner was cheating on him.
- Tart Carlos as one of the three "judgers"
- Jaclyn Jose as one of the three "judgers"

== Production ==
Broken Heart's Trip is a co-production by BMC Films and Smart Films. It was directed by Lemuel Lorca. Lex Bonife did the story while Archie del Mundo did the screenplay. The film revolves around five LGBT characters.

Principal photography took place in several locations across the Philippines such as Mount Banahaw in Lobo, Batangas, Kawasan Falls in Cebu, Pagudpud in Ilocos Norte, and a river in Magdalena, Laguna for whitewater rafting.

== Release ==
Broken Heart's Trip premiered in cinemas in the Philippines on December 25, 2023, as one of the official entries of the 2023 Metro Manila Film Festival.

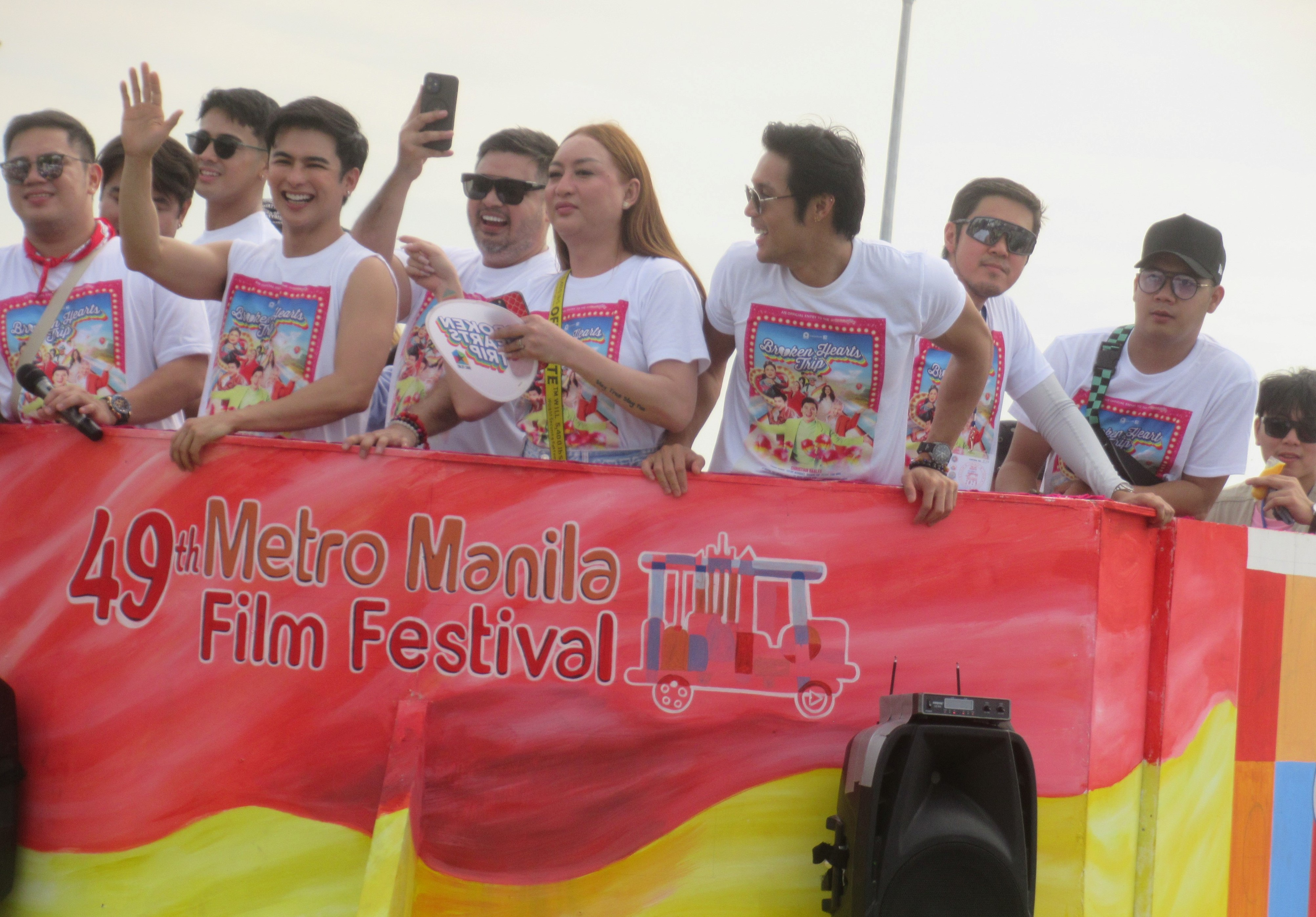
Casts in Float Parade of Stars

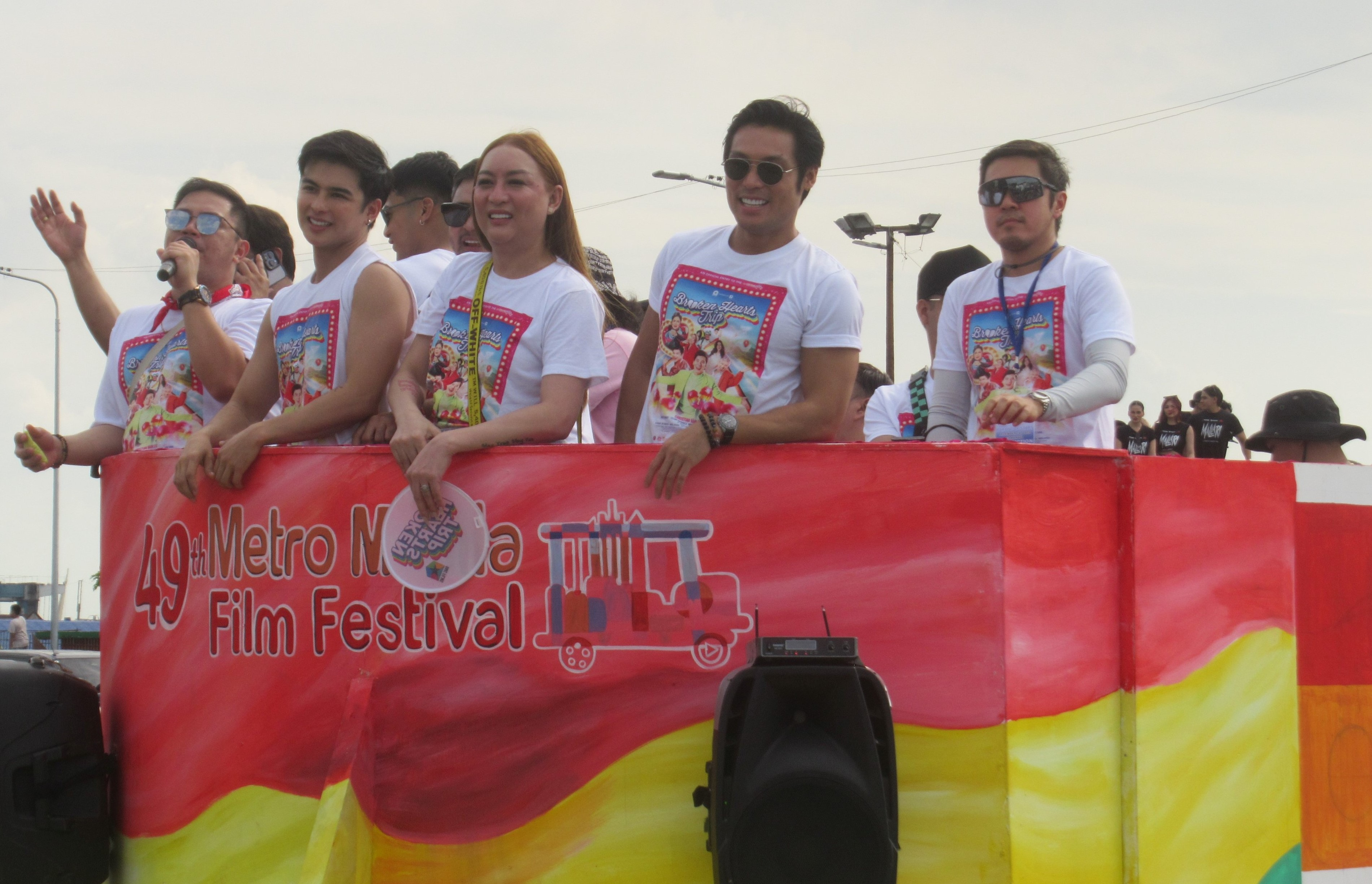
Parade of Stars

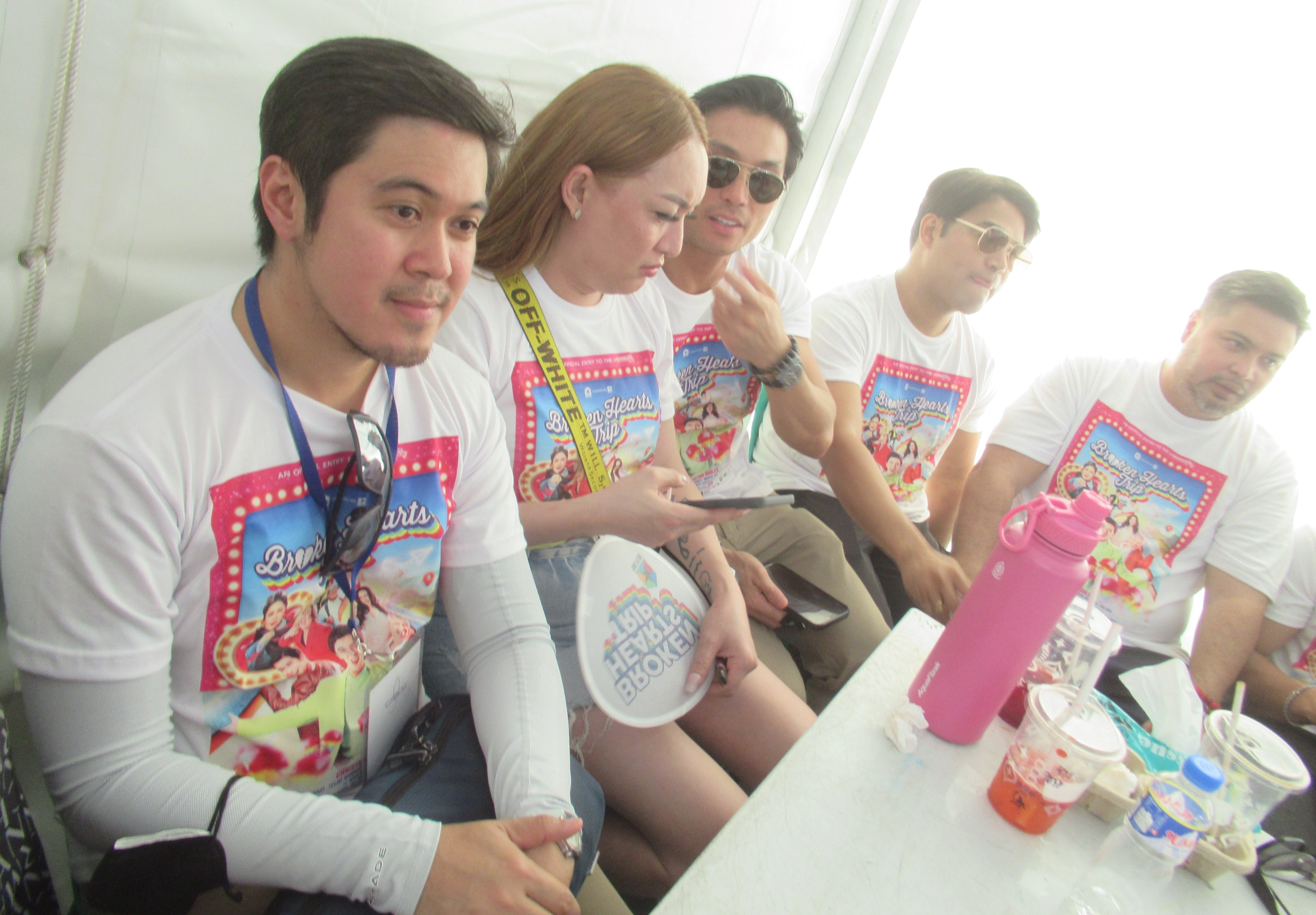
Cast, Parade of Stars

== Accolades ==
Accolades received by Broken Heart's Trip
Award	Date of ceremony	Category	Recipient(s)	Result	Ref.
2023 Metro Manila Film Festival	December 27, 2023	Gender Sensitivity Award	Broken Hearts Trip	Nominated	
