= 1 for 3 =

Philippine television sitcom series

- Title card
- Genre: Sitcom
- Written by: Abner Tulagan; Michael Tuviera; Mon Roco; Isko Salvador
- Directed by: Bert de Leon
- Starring: Vic Sotto; Rosanna Roces; Ai-Ai delas Alas
- Country of origin: Philippines
- Original language: Tagalog

Production
- Camera setup: Multiple-camera setup
- Running time: 42 minutes
- Production company: M-Zet Productions

Original release
- Network: GMA Network
- Release: April 10, 1997 – June 24, 2001

1 for 3 is a Philippine television sitcom series broadcast by GMA Network. Directed by Bert de Leon, it premiered on April 10, 1997. The series concluded on June 24, 2001.

== Premise ==
Gene, a high school teacher who won a lottery ticket to own a house in an exclusive subdivision, has to share the house with two other co-winners in the lottery, Marilen and Susie. Left with no other choice, the reluctant new trio has to live together under one roof and deal with the house's landlady Tambulite, who thinks that her tenants have a threesome relationship.

== Cast and characters ==
Cast

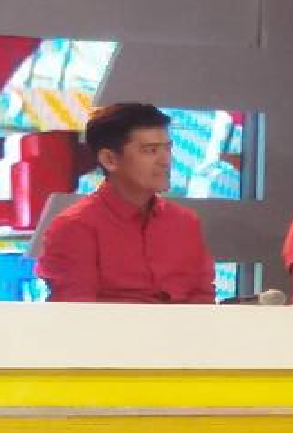
Vic Sotto

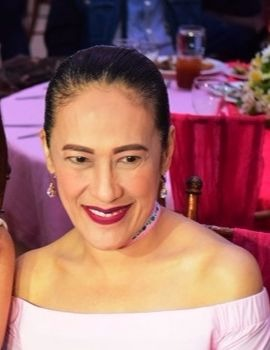
Ai-Ai delas Alas

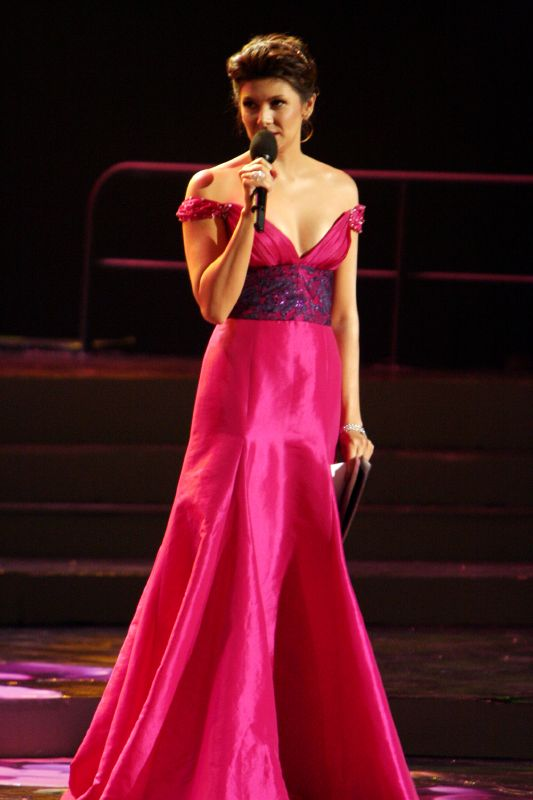
Charlene Gonzales

Lead cast

- Vic Sotto as Eugenio / Gene / Jean
- Rosanna Roces as Susie
- Charlene Gonzales as Marilen
- Ai-Ai delas Alas as Tambulite / Tam
- Imee Marcos as Cynthia

Supporting cast

- Nanette Inventor as Mrs. Lorenzo
- Joshua Zamora as Miko Lorenzo
- Allan K. as Alexis / Gorgonio "Gorgy" Magalpoc
- Miles Canapi as Bubbles
- Patricia Perez as Val
- Mickey Ferriols as Jamie

Guest cast

- Lorna Tolentino as Yugie
- Joey de Leon as Jake
- Jimmy Santos as Juanito
- Rico J. Puno as Billy
- Onyok Velasco as Lester
- Berting Labra as Berto
