= It's Your Lucky Day =

Philippine noontime variety show

- Promotional poster
- Genre: Game show; Variety show
- Created by: ABS-CBN Corporation
- Developed by: ABS-CBN Corporation
- Written by: Vanessa Alex Balite; Waldo Bautista; Isa Reyes
- Directed by: Jon Moll
- Presented by: Luis Manzano; Melai Cantiveros; Robi Domingo; Jennica Garcia; Francine Diaz; Seth Fedelin; Kyle Echarri; Andrea Brillantes; Negi; Long Mejia; Petite; Divine Tetay
- Theme music composer: Rey E. Cantong and Kaye Malana-Cantong
- Opening theme: "It's Your Lucky Day!" by Various Artists
- Country of origin: Philippines
- Original language: Filipino
- No. of episodes: 12

Production
- Executive producers: Carlo L. Katigbak; Cory V. Vidanes; Laurenti M. Dyogi; Luis L. Andrada
- Producers: Rose Casala; Katrina Genova-Bitara
- Production locations: Studio 3, ABS-CBN Broadcasting Center, Quezon City, Philippines
- Camera setup: Multiple-camera setup
- Running time: 180 minutes
- Production company: ABS-CBN Studios

Original release
- Network: Kapamilya Channel (Note: The show also airs on A2Z, Jeepney TV, Kapamilya Online Live, GTV, and worldwide via The Filipino Channel. It also available on-demand via iWantTFC.)
- Release: October 14 – October 27, 2023

It's Your Lucky Day is a Philippine noontime variety show under ABS-CBN Studios. It originally aired from October 14 to 27, 2023 serving as interim replacement of It's Showtime, which was suspended from airing for 12 days by the Movie and Television Review and Classification Board (MTRCB).

The show features celebrities and comedians like Luis Manzano, Melai Cantiveros, Robi Domingo, Jennica Garcia, Francine Diaz, Seth Fedelin, Kyle Echarri, Andrea Brillantes and Negi.

== Development and production ==
It's Your Lucky Day premiered on October 14, 2023, as an original programming by ABS-CBN Studios under the timeslot of It's Showtime, another variety show which was suspended from airing by the Movie and Television Review and Classification Board (MTRCB). The MTRCB suspended It's Showtime for 12 days due to an alleged obscene act of improper etiquette involving Vice Ganda and Ion Perez in a July 25 episode Isip Bata segment. The show itself is a similar to interim show, Magpasikat. The same production team behind It's Showtime is responsible for making It's Your Lucky Day.

ABS-CBN has already planned to create a game and variety show for Luis "Lucky" Manzano and his colleagues even before MTRCB took action against It's Showtime. This includes plans for segments and games. The suspension caused the premiere telecast It's Your Lucky Day to be forwarded to an earlier date as planned.

It's Your Lucky Day would air until October 27.

== Show segments ==
=== Pangma-LuckCASHan ===
In Pangma-LuckCASHan, the hosts select 10 audience members based on a challenge, like telling a joke, singing, or dancing to the theme song. Contestants qualify for Pangma-LuckCASHan Pick if Luis approves. Starting from the October 23rd episode, coins are used instead of cards. The coins feature either "Luisa" (Luis in a wig) or a crying Luis at his wedding.

Pangma-LuckCASHan Pick

In Pangma-LuckCASHan Pick, participants choose one card from ten, with five "swerte" cards and five "lucky" cards. The hosts draw a word from a bowl, and those with the matching word move to the CASHinko round. Starting from the October 23rd episode, a coin toss determines who moves to the CASHinko round, based on whether the coin shows "Luisa" or a crying Luis. Those not chosen receive ₱1,000 for participating.

=== CASHinko ===
In CASHinko, participants chosen from Pangma-LuckCASHan Pick receive ₱5,000 as starting money. They drop a ball on the CASHinko board, which can double, triple, quadruple, quintuple, or bankrupt their money based on where it lands. If the ball lands on the "x5" corner, they get another chance to drop a ball, and the value earned on the second drop is theirs to keep. For example, if the ball lands on "x4," they get an additional ₱20,000. The first drop's winnings are totaled for the group and then divided among the five players.

=== Lucky-ing Kalye ===
The hosts of "Lucky-ing Kalye" will choose a predetermined number of competitors from the crowd to compete for a prize by completing a challenge they will present. Both the winning and losing contestants (excluding Basta't Driver, Lucky Player which only picks one winner) will receive a cash prize, with the winner receiving the majority of the cash prize.

List of Lucky-ing Kalye challenges
| Basta't Driver, Lucky Player | The chosen driver (of a tricycle, jeepney, or similar vehicle) gets to pick one of three prizes: ₱2,000 or ₱3,000 in cash, a full tank of gas, or ₱5,000 worth of groceries. |
| Bato-Bato Lucky Pick | Two contestants play rock, paper, scissors using large paddles decorated with the images of a rock, paper, or scissors. The first contestant to score three points wins. |
| Timbang Swerte | Two contestants are challenged to guess if the goods they brought to the market are heavy (mabigat) or light (magaan). The hosts weigh the contestants' goods, then spin a wheel with the words "heavy" or "light." The contestants line up on two podiums based on their guesses. |
| Bongga Ka Dice | Two contestants roll two giant dice on a platform. The contestant with the higher total number of dots after rolling the dice wins. |
| Bola Bola, Tamang Hula | Two contestants are challenged to pick a ball from one side of a giant box, aiming to match the color of the host's pick on the other side. Each contestant has 3 attempts, with ₱2,000 awarded for every correct match. |

=== Lucky Pick ===
In Lucky Pick, five randomly selected participants receive ₱1,000 for participating. They each get a "lucky weapon" to complete a specific task, such as scooping marbles onto a table within a time limit. Participants are ranked based on the weight of the marbles they scoop. After five rounds, the best performer wins ₱10,000 and advances to the Match-Swerte round.

=== Pot Luck ===
In Pot Luck, five randomly selected players receive ₱1,000 for participating. They each choose from 100 pots containing questions, from easy to hard. If they answer correctly, they earn a point; if wrong, other players can steal the question. The first player to reach three points wins ₱10,000 and advances to the Match-Swerte round.

=== Da Hula Who? ===
In Da Hula Who, five contestants are tasked with guessing the "guest of honor" who has the traits mentioned by the hosts. They are instantly given ₱1,000 right away as payment for their participation. At the game, there are three "guests of honor"; only one has the correct trait. All contestants are required to submit their answers on their respective podiums, and if they are correct, they will move on to the next round; if not, they will be eliminated and will receive ₱1,000. The winning contestant is given ₱10,000 pesos, and he or she then advances straight to the Match-Swerte round.

=== Knock Knock, Who's Door? ===
In Knock Knock, Who's Door, five randomly selected contestants must open three layers of doors. The first layer has three doors, the second has two, and the third has one, each with a unique key. It's a time-to-beat elimination; the first player sets a time limit for others to beat. Contestants who can't finish within the time are eliminated. The winner gets ₱10,000 and advances to the Match-Swerte round.

=== Match-Swerte ===
In Match-Swerte, winners of Lucky Pick, Pot Luck, Da Hula Who?, or Knock Knock, Who's Door? have a chance to win a specific showcase (like a kitchen or gadget set). The contestant selects one of three items that they think matches the total value of the showcase. The showcase's total value is displayed as a hint. The unselected items are revealed, and if the contestant's choice equals the total cost of the items, they win the showcase.

=== Stars of All Seasons ===
The Stars of All Seasons is a singing competition that is open to civilians 50 years of age and older.

Format

The competition has two rounds: Classic Songs and Modern Songs. The hosts call the two participants "Contest-stars," who compete to be the daily winner. Their performances are judged based on the average number of stars given by the Star-Judges.

Daily Rounds & Weekly Finals

The Contest-stars perform a classic song (released before 2000) and a modern song (released after 2000). The contestant with the highest average score wins the daily round, earning ₱10,000, while runners-up receive ₱5,000. Weekly finals feature 9 contestants (5 from Week 1 and 4 from Week 2) performing a song of their choice. The top 2 weekly finalists advance to the Grand Finals, earning an additional ₱20,000, while non-advancing finalists receive ₱10,000 as a consolation prize.

Grand Finals

Dubbed as "The Brightest Finale", the grand finals premiered on October 27, 2023, the same day as the show's finale. The four grand finalists must perform two songs (classic and modern). At the end of the competition, Allan Urbiztondo of Mabalacat, Pampanga was named the "Stars of All Seasons", and received a trophy and ₱50,000. Meanwhile, the other grand finalists received a consolation prize of ₱10,000. He later crossed over to the seventh season of Tawag ng Tanghalan to compete in the Semifinals.

== Hosts ==
=== Final hosts ===
- Luis Manzano
- Melai Cantiveros
- Robi Domingo
- Jennica Garcia
- Negi
- Long Mejia
- Francine Diaz
- Seth Fedelin
- Kyle Echarri
- Andrea Brillantes
- Petite
- Divine Tetay

Guest co-hosts

- Shaina Magdayao (October 14–17, 19-23, 26-27 episodes)
- Bianca Umali (October 16–19, 21-26 episodes)
- Vilma Santos-Recto (October 21 episode)
- Jessy Mendiola (October 27 episode)

Stars of All Seasons judges

- Katrina Velarde (October 14–23, 25-26 episodes)
- Jamie Rivera (October 14–18, 20–21, 24, 27 episodes)
- Joey Generoso (October 14–16 episodes)
- Sheryn Regis (October 16–20, 24-27 episodes)
- Christian Bautista (October 17–21, 24-27 episodes)
- Nina (October 19 episode)
- Vilma Santos-Recto (October 21 episode)
- Kuh Ledesma (October 23–27 episodes)
- Boboy Garrovillo of APO Hiking Society (October 23 episode)
- Jim Paredes of APO Hiking Society (October 23 episode)

== Soundtrack ==
Rey E. Cantong and Kaye Malana-Cantong, the lead vocalists of the band Six Part Invention, were responsible for the theme song of It's Your Lucky Day.
