= Eva Darren =

Filipino actress

- Born: Philippines
- Occupation: Actress
- Years active: 1963–present

Eva Darren is a Filipino actress.

== Career ==
Darren started appearing in movies during the early 1960s. She won the FAMAS Award for Best Supporting Actress for the movie Ang Pulubi (1969) starring Charito Solis.

In 1998, she was nominated for Gawad Urian Best Supporting Actress in the movie Ligaya Ang Itawag Mo Sa Akin (1997) starring Rosanna Roces. Her memorable mother role was in the hit ABS-CBN's TV series Pangako Sa 'Yo (2000), where she played the adoptive mother of Kristine Hermosa. She appeared as fortuneteller in Sineserye Presents: Patayin Sa Sindak si Barbara (2008) with Kris Aquino as Barbara.

She was part of the film Ate in 2008, which stars the sisters Ara Mina and Cristine Reyes.

=== 72nd FAMAS Controversy ===
During the 72nd FAMAS Award held at the Fiesta Pavillon, Manila Hotel on May 26, 2024, FAMAS President Francia Conrad apologized to Darren: "they were not able to “locate” her because they were “running a live show with myriads of people,” she said. Darren was tasked but failed to present Special Citations to Tirso Cruz III, after she received a notice of invitation for the FAMAS awards night", Fernando de la Pena, her son, said. A "young singer" Sheena Palad replaced Darren, who paid P5,000 ($90) per plate for her 4 grandchildren. On May 28, Darren and her family decided to accept the olive branch of FAMAS organizers for the incomprehensible irresponsible snub. "Please stick to the script… and maybe a nice pair of eyeglasses for all in charge,” Darren's son Fernando recommended.

== Filmography ==
=== Films ===
Year	Title	Role	Note(s)	Ref(s).
1963	Aninong Bakal			
1964	Nagngangalit Na Damdamin			
1964	Mabangis: Walang Patawad			
1964	Larawan ng Pag-ibig			
1964	Mga Guerrera			
1965	Dolpinger			
1965	Dolpinger: Agent sa lagim			
1965	7 Mukha ni Dr. Ivan			
1965	Kulog at Kidlat			
1965	Scarface, at Al Capone: Ang Espiya sa Ginto			
1965	Tatlong mabilis sa Hong Kong			
1966	The Brides of Blood Island	Alma		
1966	Wanted: Johnny L		Credited as "Eva Darren"	
1966	Chinatown			
1966	Apat Na Ipo-Ipo			
1966	Sharpshooter			
1966	Maginoong Pusakal			
1966	Crossfire			
1966	Agent Wooley Booley, at ang 7 Bikini	7 Bikini		
1967	Ang Langit sa Lupa			
1967	Kung Ano ang Puno Siya sa Bunga			
1967	Bravados			
1967	Mr. 8 Ball			
1967	No Read, No Write			
1967	Pilyo sa Girls			
1967	Samuel Bilibid			
1968	Brides of Blood	Alma		
1968	Igorota			
1968	Joe Domino			
1969	The Beggar			
1970	Pipo (A Time for Dying)			
1970	Undefeated Five (Operation Sexy-5)			
1970	Lupang Buhay			
1970	Romantika			
1970	Santa Teresa de Avila			
1970	Island of Love (5 Uri ng Pag-ibig)			
1971	Pobreng Alindahaw (Ulilang Tutubi)			
1971	Sa Bawa't Patak ng Hamog			
1971	Apoy sa Madaling Araw			
1971	Bakit Ba... Candida?		Cameo	
1971	Hukom Bitay			
1971	Maging Akin Ka Lamang			
1971	Kurikit			
1972	Naku Poooo!			
1972	Guiller S. Perez' Destiny of the Living Dead		Subtitled: Hantungan ng Mga Sugapa	
1973	Basco Silang (Ang Tagapagtanggol)			
1973	Death: By Installment			
1975	Ang Mga Kasalanan ni Emmaruth			
1975	Ang Madugong Daigdig ni Salvacion			
1975	Tag-ulan sa Tag-araw			
1986	Nakagapos Na Puso			
1990	Anak ni Baby Ama	Aida		
1992	Sana Kahit Minsan			
1994	Shake, Rattle & Roll V	Mrs. Pineda	"Anino" segment	
1995	Kailanman	Mrs. Sanchez		
1997	They Call Me Joy	Gunda	Original title: Ligaya ang Itawag Mo sa Akin	
1997	Mapusok	Carmelita, Aida's mother		
1998	The Man in Selya's Life	Piling	Original title: Ang Lalaki sa Buhay ni Selya	
1998	Curacha: Ang Babaeng Walang Pahinga	Aida's mother		
1998	Tatlo... Magkasalo	Upeng		
1998	Kay Tagal Kang Hinintay	Aling Celia		
1998	Armadong Hudas	Aling Saling		
1999	Mula sa Puso: The Movie	Josefina "Pining" Miranda		
1999	Kahapon, May Dalawang Bata			
1999	Resbak: Babalikan Kita	Nanay Sita		
2000	Sugatang Puso	Virginia Abeto		
2001	Mila	Mila's mother		
2005	Bikini Open			
2006	All About Love	Kikay's lola	"Promdi" segment	
2007	Paraiso: Three Stories of Hope		Original title: Paraiso: Tatlong Kwento ng Pag-asa	
2007	Silip			
2007	Ouija	Avantra		
2007	A Love Story	Delia		
2008	Ate			
2015	Everyday I Love You	Lola Marivic		
2016	Ligaw			
2018	Mama's Girl	Nenita		
2018	Kasal	Lola Rowena		

=== Television ===
Year	Title	Role
1963	Hiwaga sa Bahay na Bato	Linda
1994	Maalaala Mo Kaya: Dancing Shoes	Lydia
1995	Maalaala Mo Kaya: Lupa	Selma
1997	Mula sa Puso	Josefina "Pining" Miranda
1999	Wansapanataym: Madyik Sandok	Aling Ganting
1999	Marinella	Editha
2000	Pangako sa 'Yo	Belen Macaspac
2000	Munting Anghel	Intiang
2003	Darating ang Umaga	Olinda
2005	Magpakailanman: The Jose & Perlita Claro Story	Guest
2005	Carlo J. Caparas' Ang Panday	Nana Selo
2005	Now and Forever: Ganti	Nenita
2006	Now and Forever: Linlang	Sister Stella
2007	Komiks Presents: Pedro Penduko at ang mga Engkantao	Azon
2007	Mars Ravelo's Lastikman	Guest
2007	Sineserye Presents: Hiram na Mukha	Azon
2008	Maalaala Mo Kaya: Hair Clip	Lola
2008	Maalaala Mo Kaya: Robot	Guest
2008	Sineserye Presents: Patayin sa Sindak si Barbara	Elsa Magbintang
2008	Maalaala Mo Kaya: Kanin	Prisoner
2008	Your Song Presents: Kapag Ako Ay Nagmahal	Guest
2009	Maalaala Mo Kaya: Chess	Guest
2009	Jim Fernandez's Kambal sa Uma	Lola Salve
2009	Maalaala Mo Kaya: Bisikleta	Maria
2009	May Bukas Pa	Helen
2009	Maalaala Mo Kaya: Tsinelas	
2010	Rubi	Mameng
2010	Bantatay	Vangie
2010	Maalaala Mo Kaya: Pinwheel	Piling
2010	My Driver Sweet Lover	Sor Aguida
2011	Maalaala Mo Kaya: TV	Concordia
2012	Maalaala Mo Kaya: Baunan	Lola
2012	Wako Wako	Guest
2012	Maalaala Mo Kaya: Gong	Apo
2012	Wansapanataym: Yaya Yaya Puto Maya	Old woman
2012	Kung Ako'y Iiwan Mo	Madame Almira
2013	Kakambal ni Eliana	Aurora Cascavel
2013	Maalaala Mo Kaya: Picture Frame	Rosario
2013	Maalaala Mo Kaya: Double Bass	Josie
2014	Carmela: Ang Pinakamagandang Babae sa Mundong Ibabaw	Lola Wagay
2014	Ipaglaban Mo: Amin ang Pamana Mo	Lola Cecilia
2015	The Rich Man's Daughter	Isabeli Tanchingco
2016	Wish I May	Mamita Linsangan
2016	Maalaala Mo Kaya: Anino	Maring
2017	The Promise of Forever	Lola Faye Zialcita
2018	Kadenang Ginto	Cecilia Mangubat
2024	Abot-Kamay na Pangarap	Juanita "Juaning" Banaag / Juanita "Nita" Francisco
2024	Wish Ko Lang: Inabusong Ina	Lola Lupe
2025	Mga Batang Riles	Ima Hana Salvacion

== Awards and nominations ==
Year	Award	Category	Nominated work	Result
1968	FAMAS Award	Best Supporting Actress	Ang Langit sa Lupa	Nominated
1969	FAMAS Award	Best Supporting Actress	Igorota	Nominated
1970	FAMAS Award	Best Supporting Actress	Ang Pulubi	Won
1970	Manila Film Festival	Best Supporting Actress	Ang Pulubi	Won
1998	Gawad Urian Award	Best Supporting Actress	Ligaya ang Itawag Mo sa Akin	Nominated
2024	The Eddys	Movie Icon Award	Herself	Won
