= Sindak =

Philippine thriller film

- Directed by: Mario O'Hara
- Screenplay by: Mario O'Hara
- Story by: Ronnie Tumbokon
- Produced by: John Robert Porter Jr.
- Starring: John Rendez; William Martinez; Gardo Versoza
- Cinematography: Romulo Araojo
- Edited by: George Jarlego
- Music by: Blitz Padua
- Production company: Metal Dog Productions
- Distributed by: Crown Seven Ventures
- Release date: December 15, 1999
- Running time: 90 minutes
- Country: Philippines
- Language: Filipino

Sindak is a 1999 Philippine thriller film directed by Mario O'Hara. The film stars John Rendez (who produced the film under his real name), William Martinez and Gardo Versoza.

== Synopsis ==
The story follows four men who work as security guards by night and indulge on sexual escapades by day while spending their weekends drinking gin after their monkey hunting expedition. During their trips, they encounter a man whom they suspected as a serial murderer and kills him. The man whom the group taught was dead comes back to haunt them one by one.

== Cast ==
Main cast

- John Rendez as Mulong
- William Martinez as Terry
- Gardo Versoza as Raul
- Mike Magat as Ed

Supporting cast

- Rita Magdelena as Susan
- Aya Medel as Cora
- Allen Dizon as Lar
- Maria Isabel Lopez as Ballikbayan
- Carlos Morales as Photographer
- Edwin O'Hara as Rabago
- Mon Confiado as Ed's Co-guard
- Dennis Coronel as Mando
- Dante Belen as Cora's Father
- Josie Tagle as Matrona
- Eugene Domingo as Eatery Owner
- Rina Rosal as Pick-up Girl
- Olga Natividad as Mulong's 1st Victim
- Lawrence Roxas as Dennis
- Janice Mendoza as Emma
- Joel Masilungan as Baliw
- Gilbert Onida as Investigator
- Koko Teodoro as Catographer
- Paolo O'Hara as Terry's Co-guard
- Evelyn Camasura as Terry's Aunt
- Cris Maruso as Matrona's Boyfriend
- Nemie Samson as Guy in Film Center
- Max Paglinawan as Ed's Father
- Anna Rose Bautista as Policewoman
- Trixie Alcazar as Mulong's Girlfriend
- Japh Bahian as Prisoner
- Jeff San Juan as Hunting Guide
- Jerson Ramos as Hunting Guide
- Edwin Amado as Ed's Co-guard

== Production ==
Director Mario O'Hara dropped out in the middle of the film's post-production reportedly due to creative differences.
