= The Trial of Andres Bonifacio =

- Directed by: Mario O'Hara
- Written by: Janice O'Hara
- Produced by: Mario O'Hara
- Starring: Alfred Vargas; Lance Raymundo
- Cinematography: Mike Garcia
- Edited by: Apol Dating
- Production company: Cinemalaya
- Release date: July 13, 2010
- Running time: 119 minutes
- Language: Filipino

The Trial of Andres Bonifacio (Filipino: Ang Paglilitis ni Andres Bonifacio) is a 2010 film directed by Mario O'Hara. It was entered in the Director's Showcase category of that year's Cinemalaya film festival, and was the director's last film.

== Synopsis ==
In the year 1897 in Cavite, the story focuses on the trial of Andres Bonifacio, a revolutionary founder of Katipunan and his brother Procopio who are arrested and charged of sedition and treason by Emilio Aguinaldo, the President of the newly founded, revolutionary government after their altercation at the Tejeros Convention.

== Cast ==
- Alfred Vargas as Andrés Bonifacio
- Lance Raymundo as Emilio Aguinaldo
- Danielle Castaño as Gregoria de Jesus
- Ian Palma as Pío del Pilar
- Angelica Kanapi as Miles Kanapi

== Awards and nominations ==
Award-Giving Body	Category	Recipient	Result
Cinemalaya Independent Film Festival	Best Film - Directors Showcase	Mario O'Hara	Nominated
PMPC Star Awards for Movies	Digital Movie Production Designer of the Year	Bella Herrero	Nominated
