= Mapusok =

Philippine drama film

- Directed by: Mel Chionglo
- Screenplay by: Ricky Lee
- Produced by: Orly Ilacad
- Starring: Rosanna Roces; Julio Diaz; Emilio Garcia
- Cinematography: George Tutanes
- Edited by: Jess Navarro
- Music by: Nonong Buencamino
- Production companies: OctoArts Films; Cinemax Studios
- Distributed by: OctoArts Films
- Release date: November 5, 1997
- Running time: 120 minutes
- Country: Philippines
- Language: Filipino

Mapusok is a 1997 Philippine drama film directed by Mel Chionglo. The film stars Rosanna Roces, Julio Diaz and Emilio Garcia.

== Cast ==
- Rosanna Roces as Emma
- Julio Diaz as Ben
- Emilio Garcia as Alfred
- Michelle Ortega as Dina
- Eva Darren as Carmelita
- Bodjie Pascua as Senyong
- Sherry Lara as Ninang Sion
- Ihman Esturco as Charlie
- Freddie Elasigue as Priest
