= Hiwaga sa Bahay na Bato =

1963–64 Philippine television drama series

- Also known as: Mystery at the Stone House
- Genre: Drama; Fantasy; Action
- Written by: Jose Miranda Cruz
- Directed by: Jose Miranda Cruz
- Starring: Dalton de Castro; Flora Cristobal; Eva Darren; Teddy Santos; Noel Nolasco; Estela Grande; Baby Bernardo; Ernesto Fajardo; Lina Chico; Ben David
- Country of origin: Philippines
- Original language: Filipino
- No. of episodes: 108

Production
- Production location: Philippines
- Running time: 30 minutes

Original release
- Network: ABS-CBN
- Release: September 30, 1963 – January 25, 1964

Hiwaga sa Bahay na Bato (lit. 'mystery at the stone house') is a Philippine television drama series broadcast by ABS-CBN. Directed by Jose Miranda Cruz, it stars Dalton de Castro, Flora Cristobal, Eva Darren, Teddy Santos, Noel Nolasco, Estela Grande, Baby Bernardo, Ernesto Fajardo, Lina Chico and Ben David. It aired from September 30, 1963 to January 25, 1964. The program is considered to be one of the first television-produced drama serials in the Philippines.

== Cast ==
- Dalton de Castro as Sonia
- Flora Cristobal as Tiya Berta
- Eva Darren as Linda
- Teddy Santos as Rommel
- Noel Nolasco as Froilan
- Lita Delos Reyes as Onay
- Estela Grande as Alona
- Baby Bernardo as Candice
- Ernesto Fajardo as Alfred
- Lina Chico as Gloria
- Ben David as Rowell
