= Aagos ang Dugo =

2001 action drama film by Mauro Gia Samonte

- Directed by: Mauro Gia Samonte
- Written by: Mauro Gia Samonte
- Produced by: Lily Y. Monteverde
- Starring: Gardo Versoza; Isabel Granada; Derek Dee; Lovely Rivero; Kier Legaspi; Ricardo Cepeda
- Cinematography: Carding Herrera; Caloy Salcedo
- Edited by: Danny Gloria
- Music by: Nonong Buencamino
- Production company: Regal Entertainment
- Distributed by: Regal Entertainment
- Release date: October 31, 2001
- Running time: 95 minutes
- Country: Philippines
- Language: Filipino

Aagos ang Dugo (transl. Blood Will Flow) is a 2001 Philippine action drama film written and directed by Mauro Gia Samonte. The film stars Gardo Versoza, Isabel Granada, Derek Dee, Lovely Rivero, Kier Legaspi and Ricardo Cepeda.

The film is streaming online on YouTube.

== Plot ==
Gino (Gardo) and Abet (Kier) are released from jail by Perlita (Isabel) for a job to kidnap a child (Christian) for ransom money. The two are unaware that it is planned by Perlita's estranged husband Martin (Ricardo), whose business has gone bankrupt. In the middle of the job, Gino and Perlita fall in love with each other.

== Cast ==
- Gardo Versoza as Gino
- Isabel Granada as Perlita
- Derek Dee as Gilbert
- Lovely Rivero as Emma
- Kier Legaspi as Abet
- Ricardo Cepeda as Martin
- Mon Confiado as Sam
- Dindo Arroyo as Benjo
- Brando Navarro as Bugoy
- Sharla Sanchez as Dalia
- Christian Galindo as Jun
- Marees Niña Legson
- Luigi Arnesto
- Mark Christopher Melles

== Production ==
The film was shot in Real, Quezon and Antipolo, Rizal.

Production of the film took over a month sometime in 2000. It was in Halloween of 2001 when it finally released.
