= Hamunin ang Bukas... =

1988 Filipino film starring Cherie Gil

- Directed by: Chito B. Tapawan
- Written by: Carlo Finioni
- Starring: Cherie Gil; Daniel Fernando; Odette Khan; Angie Ferro; Renato del Prado; Zorayda Sanchez; Tess Dumpit; Andro Guevarra; Mark Tiongson
- Cinematography: Tony Pacheco
- Edited by: Dante Nava
- Music by: Marita Manuel
- Release date: October 27, 1988
- Country: Philippines
- Language: Filipino

Hamunin ang Bukas... (lit. 'Challenge Tomorrow...') is a 1988 Filipino drama film about show business. It was directed by Chito B. Tapawan and stars Cherie Gil, Daniel Fernando, Odette Khan, Angie Ferro, Renato del Prado, Zorayda Sanchez, Tess Dumpit, Andro Guevarra, and Mark Tiongson. The film was released on October 27, 1988, as part of the first Chamber of Progressive Filipino Motion Picture Producers Film Festival (CPFMPP).

== Cast ==
- Cherie Gil
- Daniel Fernando
- Odette Khan
- Angie Ferro
- Renato del Prado
- Zorayda Sanchez
- Tess Dumpit
- Andro Guevarra
- Mark Tiongson
- Ray Alsona
- Dave Guanzon
- Mon Recto
- Mennen Torres
- Billy Viña
- Vilma Perez
- Lou Veloso
- Giovanni Calvo

== Production ==
Hamunin ang Bukas... is the film debut of actor Gardo Versoza (then credited as Mennen Torres).

== Release ==
Hamunin ang Bukas... was released on October 27, 1988 as part of the 1st Chamber of Progressive Filipino Motion Picture Producers Film Festival (CPFMPP). It was a box office failure.

=== Critical response ===
Lav Diaz, writing for the Manila Standard, gave the film a mixed review. He considered it the most exceptional film at the CPFMPP for its subject matter of show business, as it offers a different type of story from the other nine entries of the festival. However, he criticized its substandard scenes, dialogue, and "irritating" acting for hampering the film's quality, but expressed that Cherie Gil's performance was "okay".
