= Iyah Mina =

Filipino actress

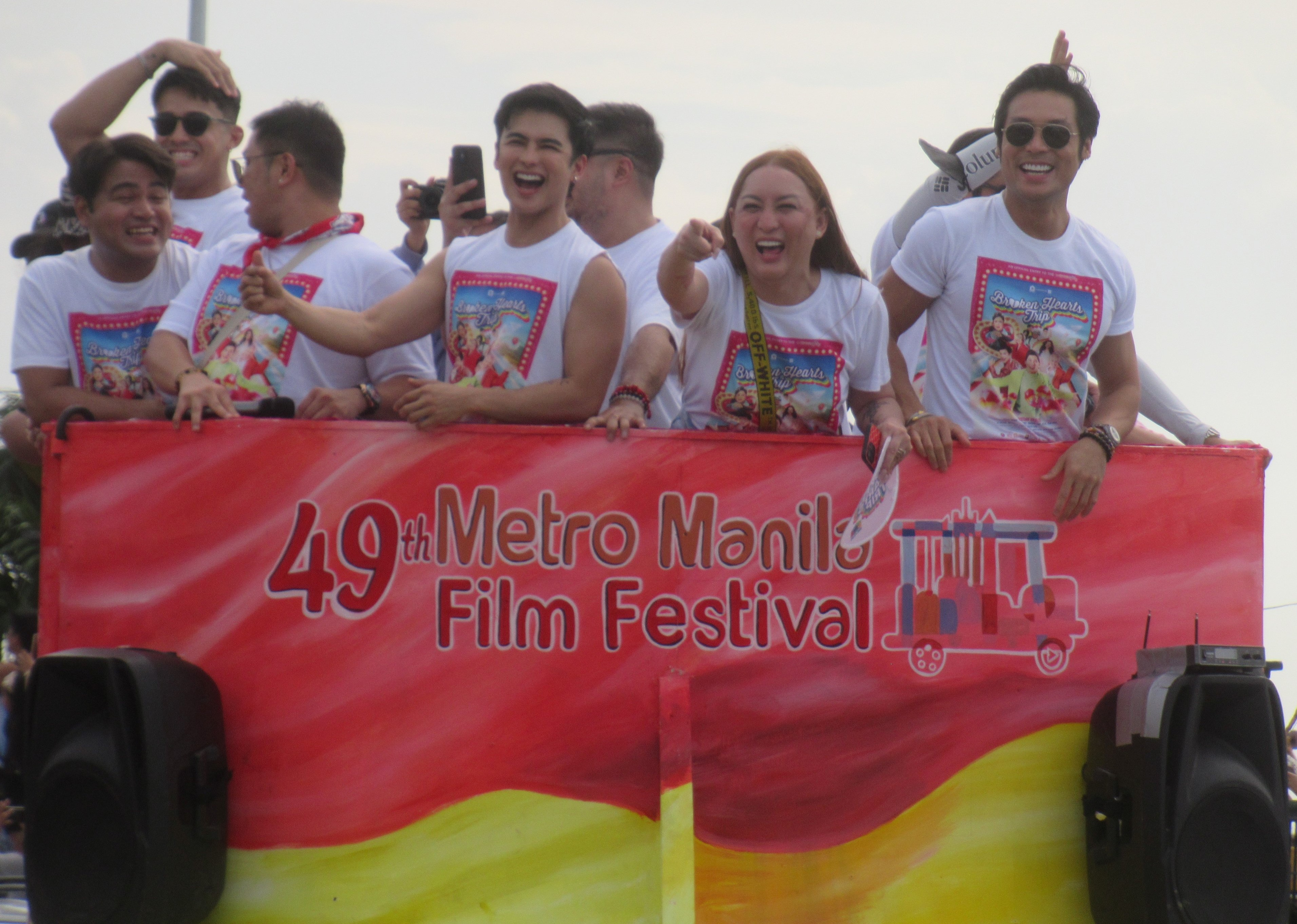
- Broken Hearts Trip
- Born: July 10, 1976 (age 50)
- Occupations: Actor; stand-up comedian
- Years active: 1999–present

Iyah Mina (born July 10, 1976) is a Filipina actress, stand-up comedian, and LGBTQ+ advocate. She made Philippine cinema history in 2018 by becoming the first transgender woman to win the Best Actress award in the country's history.

== Career ==
In 2009, Mina started working as a stand-up comic in Punchline, where she would eventually meet Vice Ganda. Vice Ganda would later on cast Mina as one of his jesters/sidekicks in the late-night comedy talk show Gandang Gabi, Vice!.

In 2018, Mina appeared in the 2018 Cinema One Originals entry Mamu; And a Mother Too, playing an aging transgender sex worker forced to take the responsibility of being a mother to her sister's orphaned transgender daughter, for which she was awarded Best Actor in the Cinema One Originals Film Festival and became the first transgender actor to win such award in the said festival and the first transgender actor to win a Best Actor award in the Philippines.

The following year, Mina appeared in Wagas Presents: Throwback Pag-ibig.

In 2020, she appeared in the iWant miniseries My Single Lady and appeared in the coming-of-age romantic drama The Boy Foretold by the Stars.

In 2024 and 2025, she appeared in the ABS-CBN Studios' game show Rainbow Rumble on Kapamilya Channel, A2Z, All TV and TV5.

== Personal life ==
Mina came out to her family as a transgender woman when she was 20 years old while she was still attending college.

== Filmography ==
=== Television ===
Year	Title	Role	Channel/Streaming platform	Notes	Source
2019	Wagas: Throwback Pag-ibig	Mama Ru	GMA News TV		
2020	My Single Lady		iWantTFC		
2021	Love Beneath The Stars	Baby R			
2022	Sino'ng Manok Mo	Herself/Referee	PIE Channel		
2024; 2025	Rainbow Rumble	Herself/Contestant	Kapamilya Channel/A2Z/ALLTV/TV5		
2025	It's Showtime	Herself/Guest Hurado/Performer	Kapamilya Channel/A2Z/ALLTV/GMA Network		

=== Film ===
Year	Title	Role	Notes	Source
2018	Mamu; And a Mother Too	Mamu	Lead role	
2020	The Boy Foretold by the Stars	Baby R		
2021	Ayuda Babes	Pinky		
2023	Here Comes the Groom	Mama Wendy	Supporting role, Official 1st Summer Metro Manila Film Festival entry	
2023	Third World Romance	Inang Reyna	Supporting role	
2025	Flower Girl		Cameo	
2025	Call Me Mother	Diosdado “Ms. J” Patumbong	Supporting role, Official 51st Metro Manila Film Festival entry	

== Awards and nominations ==
Year	Work	Award	Category	Result	Source
2018	Mamu; And a Mother Too	Cinema One Originals Film Festival	Best Actress	Won	
2019	Mamu; And a Mother Too	FAMAS Awards	Outstanding Performance by an Actress in a Leading Role	Nominated	
2019	Mamu; And a Mother Too	Gawad Urian Awards	Best Actress	Nominated	
2019	Mamu; And a Mother Too	PMPC Star Awards for Movies	New Movie Actor of the Year	Nominated	
