= My Super D =

2016 Philippine television drama series

- Title card
- Genre: Fantasy; Action; Family drama; Comedy; Superhero; Science fiction
- Created by: ABS-CBN Studios; Joel Mercado; Abet Cruz; Rondel P. Lindayag; Dindo C. Perez
- Developed by: ABS-CBN Studios; Roldeo T. Endrinal; Julie Anne R. Benitez
- Written by: Shugo Praico; John Anthony Rodulfo
- Directed by: Frasco Mortiz; Lino S. Cayetano; Claudio Tots Sanchez Mariscal IV
- Creative director: Johnny delos Santos
- Starring: Dominic Ochoa; Marco Masa; Bianca Manalo; Marvin Agustin; Sylvia Sanchez; Nonie Buencamino; Ronaldo Valdez
- Opening theme: "Andito Lang Ako" by Jugs Jugueta and Teddy Corpuz
- Original languages: Filipino; English
- No. of episodes: 64 (list of episodes)

Production
- Executive producers: Carlo L. Katigbak; Cory V. Vidanes; Laurenti M. Dyogi; Roldeo T. Endrinal
- Producer: Jennifer Soliman-Bolalin
- Production location: Metro Manila, Philippines
- Editor: Rommel Malimban
- Running time: 30-45 minutes
- Production companies: Dreamscape Entertainment Television; Mothership (visual effects)

Original release
- Network: ABS-CBN
- Release: April 18 – July 15, 2016

My Super D is a 2016 Philippine television drama fantasy series broadcast by ABS-CBN. Directed by Frasco Mortiz, Lino S. Cayetano and Claudio Tots Sanchez Mariscal IV, it stars Dominic Ochoa, Marco Masa, Bianca Manalo, Marvin Agustin, Sylvia Sanchez, Nonie Buencamino and Ronaldo Valdez. It aired on the network's Primetime Bida line up and worldwide on TFC from April 18 to July 15, 2016, replacing My Love Donna and Game ng Bayan and was replaced by Minute to Win It: Last Man Standing.

A special weekly marathon of episodes entitled My Super D: Super Marathon was also aired every Saturday nights on Yey! channel from April 23 to July 16, 2016.

== Synopsis ==
Super D (Richard Yap), a being from another planet who draws his power from a blue gem, is a superhero who saves the lives of many people, including a barangay captain named Dado (Ronnie Lazaro), who was inspired by the heroism of Super D and dedicates his life in serving others. Dado's wife Belen (Sylvia Sanchez) has a son named Dodong (Marc Santiago), who considers Super D his idol during his childhood, and met Nicole and Tony with whom he befriended.

Don Zulueta (Ronaldo Valdez), a crime lord who knows about Super D's secret, used a woman (Precious Lara Quigaman) to take Super D down. The superhero fell in love with the woman, without both of them knowing the crime lord's plan. Don Zulueta's criminal group manages to kill Super D, and to prove the superhero's death, the criminals led by his henchmen Fredo (Simon Ibarra) bombed a shopping mall, where Dado is among the casualties of the bombing.

Dodong (Dominic Ochoa) grew up as a hard-working man and ends up marrying Nicole (Bianca Manalo). They have a family with their only son Dennis (Marco Masa). One day, Dodong got involved into an accident at the construction site he was working in. Tony (Marvin Agustin) betrays Dodong by hiring a lawyer to arrest him and tries to take advantage of Nicole and Dennis for himself. Pablo (Nonie Buencamino), a graphic artist and trusted friend of the original Super D, comes to help Dodong become a real superhero, in order to save his son Dennis from a group of kidnappers. With Pablo's help, Dodong succeeds in finding the blue gem and transforms into the new Super D. After Super D defeats the kidnappers and rescues Dennis, Dodong will face the responsibilities of reuniting his own family and his duty as a superhero.

== Cast and characters ==
=== Main cast ===
- Dominic Ochoa as Rudolfo "Dodong" B. Aguilar / Super D
- Marco Masa as Dennis R. Aguilar
- Bianca Manalo as Nicole Ramirez-Aguilar
- Marvin Agustin as Anthony "Tony" Yaneza / Zulu 2.0
- Sylvia Sanchez as Evelyn "Belen" Bermudez-Aguilar
- Nonie Buencamino as Pablo Mateo
- Ronaldo Valdez as Don Ramoncito "Ramon" Zulueta / Heneral Zulu

=== Supporting cast ===
- Myrtle Sarrosa as Cherry
- Jayson Gainza as Oscar
- Jason Francisco as Michael
- Marina Benipayo as Teresa Ramirez
- Simon Ibarra as Alfredo "Fredo" Suarez
- Bong Regala as Francis Ramirez
- Atoy Co as Mang Dick
- Ryan Rems as Steve
- Jef Gaitan as Apple
- Louise Gertrude as Peaches
- David Chua as Doc Oks
- Gerard Acao as Rocky
- Dentrix Ponce as Boyet
- Daniella Tolentino as Ika
- Cong TV as Moby

=== Guest cast ===
- Richard Yap as Delta / original Super D
- Ronnie Lazaro as Dado Aguilar
- Precious Lara Quigaman as Mikaela
- Marc Santiago as young Dodong Aguilar
- Cessa Moncera as young Nicole Ramirez
- JB Agustin as young Tony Yaneza
- Francis Magundayao as teenage Dodong Aguilar
- John Bermundo as teenage Michael
- Yuguz Garcia as young Dennis Aguilar
- Nhikzy Calma as young Boyet
- Myel de Leon as young Ikay
- Ping Medina as Mario Brother 1
- Alex Medina as Mario Brother 2
- Benj Manalo as Mario Brother 3
- Bradley Holmes
- Bernard Palanca as Pedro
- Sarah Lahbati as Ulah / Tiradora
- Niño Muhlach as Kiko / Negastar
- Fourth Solomon as Bill
- Fifth Solomon as Billy

== Ratings ==
Kantar Media National TV Ratings (5:45pm PST)
Pilot Episode	Finale Episode	Peak	Average
13.2% April 18, 2016	16.1% July 15, 2016	17.8% July 7, 2016	15.7%

== Production ==
My Super D is a superhero fantasy drama directed by Frasco Mortiz and Lino Cayetano. The series is Cayetano's comeback project after his three-year break from directing.

The concept behind My Super D according to the production staff is that "everyone can be a superhero regardless of physicality." According to Mortiz, My Super D is produced as a series "for all ages" citing that there are superhero-themed series aimed only for mature audience. Commenting on what constitutes a hero in context of the drama's production "When we say superhero, what instantly comes to mind is the conventional kind — strong and muscled body — but we must not forget that a superhero possesses a good heart, too, not just all muscles." He also remarked that there are action scenes yet these have very light treatment. Before the airing of pilot episode, Mortiz expressed his enthusiasm on the opportunity to teach values to children viewers through the show such as the importance of not forgetting to pray.

=== Casting ===
The drama marks the very first protagonist role for Dominic Ochoa after having played numerous supporting roles in teleseryes. The telenovela also includes Marco Masa who was best known for his lead role in the fantasy drama Nathaniel, and Bianca Manalo who was also known for her role as Tiffany in the romantic comedy On the Wings of Love. Marvin Agustin and veteran actor Ronaldo Valdez also starred as the main antagonists. Meanwhile, Sylvia Sanchez plays a special role in this series before she eventually played her very first protagonist role in the afternoon telenovela The Greatest Love for which Nonie Buencamino was also part of.

=== Scheduling ===
My Super D was reported to replace Pasión de Amor on February 29, 2016, but was postponed because of We Will Survive and moved to summer season. The telenovela finally premiered on April 18, 2016, on a pre-primetime slot, replacing the Korean drama My Love Donna. In addition, the short-lived game show Game ng Bayan got cancelled on April 15, 2016, and thus We Will Survive moved to Kapamilya Gold afternoon block on April 18, 2016.

== See also ==
- List of programs broadcast by ABS-CBN
- List of ABS-CBN Studios original drama series
