= Rosanna Roces =

Filipina actress (born 1972)

- Born: Jennifer Cruz Adriano; May 24, 1972 (age 54); Tanza, Navotas, Rizal, Philippines
- Other name: Osang
- Occupations: Actress, TV host
- Years active: 1992–present
- Agent(s): Sparkle; Star Magic; Talent 5 Regal Entertainment; Viva Artists Agency
- Spouse(s): Blessy Arias (partner, m. 2016-present)
- Children: Onyok Roces; Grace Adriano

Rosanna Roces (born Jennifer Adriano Arias; May 24, 1972) is a Filipino actress and comedian.

== Career ==
Roces was a contract star of Seiko Films from 1994 to 1996, introduced initially as "Ana Maceda". After her years with Seiko, she appeared in the film Ligaya Ang Itawag Mo Sa Akin by Reyna Films, which paved the way for her transition to "serious acting".

Roces ventured into hosting by serving as a replacement for Dawn Zulueta on GMA Network's Startalk. Roces hosted the show until 2004, after a misunderstanding between her and her manager-friend Lolit Solis. She left GMA Network for ABS-CBN. Roces also acted on TV, appearing in shows such as 1 for 3 with Vic Sotto and Charlene Gonzales from 1997 to 2001 and Daboy en Da Girl with Rudy Fernandez from 2002 to 2003.

She was also part of ABS-CBN's Sineserye Presents: Natutulog Ba ang Diyos? as Patria and appeared in the soap opera Ysabella as Rosario and Maging Sino Ka Man: Ang Pagbabalik as Veronica Rubio. She also appeared in the finale episode of Tayong Dalawa on September 25, 2009, on ABS-CBN.

In January 2010, MTRCB suspended It's Showtime after Roces‘ insensitive comments about the teachers as “repeaters”. It's Showtime was given a 20-day preventive suspension by the board. Roces was removed as a judge of the show by ABS-CBN on January 8, 2010, as part of the network's self-regulation.

== Personal life ==
Roces was a supporter of the Kingdom Filipina Hacienda group, having appointed by its self-styled queen Salvacion Legaspi in 2015 as the "Ambassadress and Liaison of the Crown". Legaspi and her group has claimed "ownership" of the Philippines.

== Filmography ==
=== Film ===
Year	Title	Role	Ref.
1992	Comfort Women: A Cry for Justice	Ana Maceda	
1994	Machete II	Margarita	
1995	Kirot II	Olga	
1995	Kandungan		
1995	Di Mapigil ang Init	Jenny	
1996	Patikim ng Pinya	Myra	
1996	Nagbabagang Labi		
1997	Ligaya ang Itawag Mo sa Akin	Ligaya	
1997	Pusakal		
1997	Selosa		
1997	Nang Mamulat si Eba: Part 2		
1997	Matrikula		
1997	Yes Darling: Walang Matigas na Pulis... 2		
1997	Ang Lalaki sa Buhay ni Selya	Selya	
1998	Kahit Pader, Gigibain Ko	Sandy Galang	
1998	Mapusok	Emma	
1998	Curacha: Ang Babaing Walang Pahinga	Curacha/Corazon	
1998	Cariño Brutal		
1998	Ginto't Pilak		
1998	Ang Babae sa Bintana	Jack	
1999	Katawan	Carmen	
1999	Ms. Kristina Moran, Ang Babaeng Palaban	Kristina Moran	
1999	Basta't Ikaw Nangingining Pa		
2001	La Vida Rosa	Rosa	
2008	Aurora		
2008	Karera		
2009	Pasang Krus		
2009	Manila	Juliana	
2009	Wanted: Border	Mama Saleng	
2009	Baklas		
2010	Romeo at Juliet		
2010	Presa		
2011	Fable of the Fish		
2011	Haruo		
2012	My Cactus Heart	Margaret	
2012	Mater Dolorosa		
2013	On the Job		
2013	Porno		
2014	Kinabukasan	Sam	
2014	Hustisya	Divina	
2016	Padre de Familia	Ramona Santiago	
2016	Mrs.		
2017	Dark Is the Night		
2018	Hitboy		
2018	Badge of Honor: To Serve and Protect		
2019	The Panti Sisters	Vilma Panti	
2019	Unbreakable	Janice Salvador	
2020	Suarez: The Healing Priest		
2021	Paglaki Ko, Gusto Kong Maging Pornstar	Osang	
2021	Anak ng Macho Dancer	Tere	
2021	Kaka	Kamila Bataan	
2021	Revirginized	Girlie	
2021	Pornstar 2: Pangalawang Putok	Herself	
2022	Tuloy... Bukas ang Pinto		
2023	Kahit Maputi Na ang Buhok Ko	Lita	
2024	Abner		
2025	The Rapists of Pepsi Paloma	Divina Valencia	
2025	P77	Natalia Caceres	

=== Television / Digital series ===
Year	Title	Role	Ref.
1997–2004	Startalk	Herself	
1997–2001	1 For 3	Susie	
1998	Eat Bulaga!	Herself	
2002–2003	Daboy en Da Girl	Girly Dacquel	
2006	Maalaala Mo Kaya: Manicure Set	Glenda	
2007	Maalaala Mo Kaya: Buhangin	Lanie	
2007	Ysabella	Rosario Cuenca	
2007	Sineserye Presents: Natutulog Ba ang Diyos?	Patria Ocampo-Ramirez	
2007–2008	Maging Sino Ka Man: Ang Pagbabalik	Veronica "Veron" Rubio	
2008	Juicy!	Herself	
2008	Talentadong Pinoy	Herself	
2009	May Bukas Pa	Adela San Jose	
2009	Lipgloss	Princess Arabelle / Mommy A.	
2009	Tayong Dalawa	Emma Garcia	
2009	Failon Ngayon	Herself / Episode Guest	
2010	Showtime	Herself / Judge	
2010	Untold Stories Mula sa Face to Face		
2011	Mga Nagbabagang Bulaklak	Daffodil	
2011	Star Confessions		
2011	Sa Ngalan ng Ina	Lucia Ilustre	
2013	Maalaala Mo Kaya: Orasan	Gina	
2016	Ipaglaban Mo: Dahas	Elisa	
2017	Maalaala Mo Kaya: Kendi	Estrelita	
2018–19	Precious Hearts Romances Presents: Los Bastardos	Irma Esperanza	
2019–20	Pamilya Ko	Elena Carbonell-Lombardi	
2021–22	FPJ's Ang Probinsyano	Lolita Silang	
2023–2024	Pira-Pirasong Paraiso	Criselda "Bossing" Vizcarra	
2024	Pamilya Sagrado	Nadia Salvacion	
2024–2026	FPJ's Batang Quiapo	Divina Juanillo-Mondragon	
2026	My Bespren Emman	Leah Mereilles / Red Viper	

== Awards and nominations ==
=== Cinema One Originals Digital Film Festival ===
Year	Work	Category	Result	Ref.
2009	Wanted: Border	Best Actress	Won	

=== Metro Manila Film Festival ===
Year	Work	Category	Result	Ref.
2020	Suarez: The Healing Priest	Best Supporting Actress	Nominated	

=== FAMAS (Filipino Academy of Movie Arts and Sciences Awards) ===
Year	Work	Category	Result	Ref.
2015	Hustisya	Best Supporting Actress	Nominated	
1999	Ang Lalaki sa Buhay ni Selya	Best Actress	Nominated	

=== Gawad Urian (Manunuri ng Pelikulang Pilipino) ===
Year	Work	Category	Result	Ref.
2010	Presa	Best Supporting Actress	Won	
2009	Wanted: Border	Best Actress	Nominated	
2001	La Vida Rosa	Best Actress	Won*	
1998	Curacha: Ang Babaeng Walang Pahinga	Best Actress	Nominated	
1997	Ligaya Ang Itawag Mo Sa Akin	Best Actress	Nominated	

- Tied with Assunta de Rossi.
