= Vampire ang Daddy Ko =

Philippine television sitcom series

- Title card
- Genre: Sitcom
- Written by: Bibeth Orteza
- Directed by: Bibeth Orteza
- Starring: Vic Sotto; Oyo Boy Sotto
- Opening theme: "Vampire ang Daddy Ko" by Vic Sotto
- Country of origin: Philippines
- Original language: Tagalog
- No. of episodes: 169

Production
- Executive producer: Aila R. de Jesus
- Producer: Vic Sotto
- Camera setup: Multiple-camera setup
- Running time: 45 minutes
- Production company: M-Zet Productions

Original release
- Network: GMA Network
- Release: March 9, 2013 – June 12, 2016

Vampire ang Daddy Ko (transl. my daddy is a vampire) is a Philippine television sitcom series broadcast by GMA Network. The series was written and directed by Bibeth Orteza. It stars Vic Sotto and Oyo Boy Sotto in the title role. It premiered on March 9, 2013. The series concluded on June 12, 2016, with a total of 169 episodes.

== Cast and characters ==
Cast

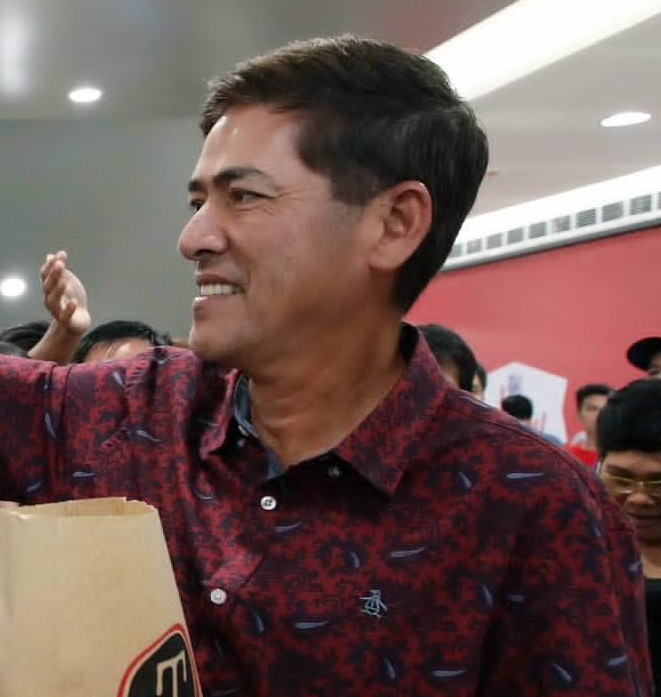
Vic Sotto

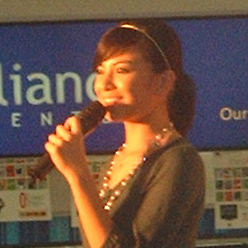
Glaiza de Castro

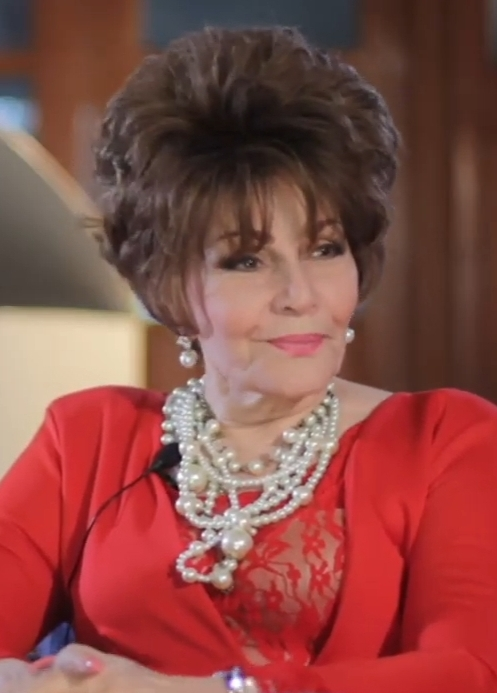
Pilita Corrales

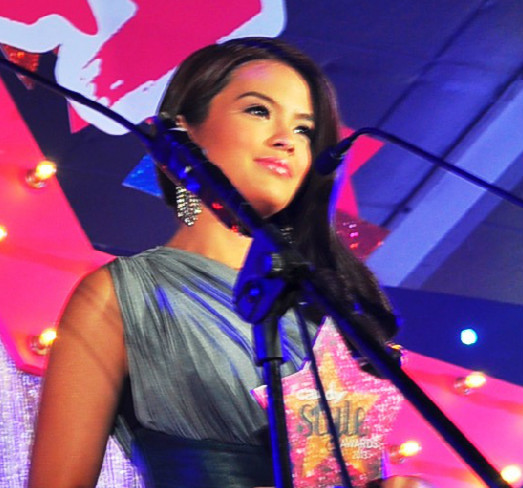
Bea Binene

Lead cast

- Vic Sotto as Victor Ventura
- Oyo Boy Sotto as Vladimir Ventura

Supporting cast

- Glaiza de Castro as Vavavoom
- Pilita Corrales as Sonya Ventura
- Jackie Lou Blanco as younger Sonya Ventura
- Jinky Oda as Omma Chamba
- Ryzza Mae Dizon as Maria "Big" Saturay
- Jimmy Santos as Small Saturay
- Allan K. as Diva
- Bea Binene as Bebe Chubibo
- Anjo Yllana as Bibo Chubibo
- Derrick Monasterio as Derry Tiwarik
- Sef Cadayona as Stefano Bulaga / Stefani Ventura
- Jinri Park as Jin
- Sam Pinto as Maria Chamba
- Jaclyn Jose as Elvyra
- Barbie Forteza as Girlie

== Ratings ==
According to AGB Nielsen Philippines' Mega Manila household television ratings, the pilot episode of Vampire ang Daddy Ko earned a 23.7% rating. The final episode scored an 18.5% rating.

== Accolades ==
Accolades received by Vampire ang Daddy Ko
Year	Award	Category	Recipient	Result	Ref.
2013	27th PMPC Star Awards for Television	Best Comedy Show	Vampire ang Daddy Ko	Nominated	
2013	27th PMPC Star Awards for Television	Best Comedy Actor	Vic Sotto	Nominated	
2013	27th PMPC Star Awards for Television	Best Comedy Actress	Ryzza Mae Dizon	Nominated	
2014	Golden Screen TV Awards	Outstanding Comedy Program	Vampire ang Daddy Ko	Nominated	
2014	Golden Screen TV Awards	Outstanding Performance by an Actor in a Gag or Comedy Program	Vic Sotto	Nominated	
2014	28th PMPC Star Awards for Television	Best Comedy Program	Vampire ang Daddy Ko	Nominated	
2014	28th PMPC Star Awards for Television	Best Comedy Actor	Vic Sotto	Nominated	
2015	29th PMPC Star Awards for Television	Best Comedy Program	Vampire ang Daddy Ko	Nominated	
2015	29th PMPC Star Awards for Television	Best Comedy Actor	Vic Sotto	Nominated	
2015	29th PMPC Star Awards for Television	Best Comedy Actress	Ryzza Mae Dizon	Nominated	
2016	2nd Alta Media Icon Awards	Best Comedy Actor for TV	Vic Sotto	Won	
2016	30th PMPC Star Awards for Television	Best Comedy Program	Vampire ang Daddy Ko	Nominated	
2016	30th PMPC Star Awards for Television	Best Comedy Actor	Vic Sotto	Nominated	
