= Wander Bra =

Filipino comedy film

- Theatrical release poster
- Directed by: Joven Tan
- Produced by: Eduardo Pablo Jr. JP Pablo
- Starring: Kakai Bautista; Myrtle Sarrosa; Gina Pareño; Gardo Versoza; Ahron Villena; Kiray Celis
- Cinematography: Teejay Gonzales
- Edited by: Jason Cahapay
- Music by: Sherwin Castillo
- Production company: Viva Films
- Distributed by: Viva Films
- Release date: September 12, 2018
- Running time: 82 minutes
- Country: Philippines
- Language: Filipino

Wander Bra is a 2018 Filipino comedy film written and directed by Joven Tan, starring Kakai Bautista, Myrtle Sarrosa, Gardo Versoza and Gina Pareño. The film was produced by Viva Films and it was released in the Philippines on September 12, 2018.

== Cast ==
- Kakai Bautista
- Myrtle Sarrosa
- Gina Pareño
- Zeus Collins
- Lassy Marquez
- Wacky Kiray
- Brian Gazmen
- Gardo Versoza
- Kiray Celis
- Ahron Villena
