= Ate Gay =

Filipino comedian (1971–2026)

- Born: Gil Aducal Morales; August 12, 1971; Tondo, Manila, Philippines
- Died: November 1, 2026 (aged 55); Muntinlupa, Philippines

Comedy career
- Years active: 1995–2026
- Medium: Television, stand-up
- Subject: Impersonation of Nora Aunor
- Musical career
- Works: Mashups
- Formerly of: Singing Cooks and Waiters (Barrio Fiesta)

Gil Aducal Morales (Tagalog: [hil moˈralɛs]; August 12, 1971 – November 1, 2026), known professionally as Ate Gay (Tagalog: [ˈʔate]), was a Filipino comedian and television host. He was an impersonator of actress Nora Aunor, whose nickname was Ate Guy. (Note: Ate (Tagalog: [ˈʔate]) is a Filipino honorific for an elder sister or any young female perceived to be older than the speaker. See wikt:ate#Tagalog) He co-presented the variety shows Comedy Bar (2010–11) and Wowowillie (2013). He was also known for his comedic mashups of popular songs.

== Early life and education ==
Ate Gay was born as Gil Aducal Morales on August 12, 1971 to a poor family in Tondo, Manila. His mother was a jueteng bettor, with Morales serving as a collector for bets.

Morales studied at the Philippine Christian University. Concurrently for two years, he worked as a janitor at the University of the East. He also worked as a dishwasher for the Department of Labor and Employment.

== Career ==
Morales was a member of the Singing Cooks and Waiters of Barrio Fiesta restaurant. In 1995, he started performing in comedy bars, particularly Music Box. He is best known for his Ate Gay persona, an impression of actress Nora Aunor, whose nickname was Ate Guy. Morales said of the actress: "I became a fan of Nora Aunor when I started working. I'm very grateful to her … She was supportive of her impersonators. She was not selfish. She didn't stop us from impersonating her."

As Ate Gay, he performed stand-up comedy and made film and television appearances. He was a regular performer at the comedy bars Klownz and Zirkoh, both owned and founded by Allan K. In 2009, Ate Gay met Boobay who was then starting his stand-up career in Baguio. Ate Gay invited Boobay to Klownz, allowing the latter to establish himself in Manila. Ate Gay was also a co-host of the variety show Comedy Bar (2010–11) on GMA Network, supporting the main hosts Eugene Domingo and Allan K.

On November 30, 2012, Ate Gay headlined his first major concert, Ako Naman… Ate Gay sa Arena, at the SM Mall of Asia Arena. Among his guest performers were the SexBomb Girls, KZ Tandingan, The Company, Aegis, Aiza Seguerra, Allan K., Boobay, John Lapus, Kevin Balot, and Nora Aunor as the special guest.

In 2013, Ate Gay was a co-host of the noontime variety show Wowowillie on TV5. On the February 28 episode, producer and main host Willie Revillame castigated Ate Gay and Ethel Booba on air. Revillame called the two co-hosts unprofessional and ungrateful after they were allegedly angry backstage for losing the costume contest, one of the show's segments. Ate Gay eventually left Wowowillie in June due to several disagreements with the production staff, but made it clear that Revillame was not the reason for his departure.

Around 2016, Ate Gay became known for his comedic mashups of popular songs.

The closure of comedy bars amidst enhanced community quarantine during the COVID-19 pandemic, led to Ate Gay opening up a siomai stall called Siomai Himala in Tondo in 2020. Meanwhile, Ate Gay posted comedic mashup songs on social media during this period which again went viral.

He closed Siomai Himala by February 2021 when acting opportunities came back and began being involved in the film Ayuda Babes. He then portrayed Elsa in the drama action series FPJ's Batang Quiapo from 2023 to 2024.

Despite his cancer diagnosis, Ate Gay remained performing as of August 2026 but limited his act to a few hours.

== Later life, illness and death ==
In March and April 2021, Ate Gay was hospitalized for severe pneumonia. (Note: He tested negative for COVID-19.) Then in June of that same year, he was hospitalized for toxic epidermal necrolysis (TEN).

In September 2025, Ate Gay disclosed that he was diagnosed with stage IV mucoepidermoid carcinoma. He disclosed that doctors projected that he would die within the year.

On October 15, 2026, Ate Gay held a living funeral in Biñan, Laguna, attended by family and friends. Two days later, he was rushed to the Asian Hospital and Medical Center where he died on November 1, 2026 of a stroke at 55 years old. He was buried at Forest Lake Memorial Parks in Biñan, Laguna.

== Personal life ==
Ate Gay was gay and considered himself as a bakla.

== Filmography ==
=== Film ===
Year	Title	Role
1999	Sa Paraiso ni Efren	
2001	Kapitan Ambo: Outside de Kalambo	
2006	Jupit	Tetay
2010	Pendong	Assunta
2010	Mamarazzi	Impersonator
2013	Bekikang: Ang Nanay Kong Beki	The midwife
2014	Maria Labo	
2015	Enteng Kabisote 10 and the Abangers	Ora's costumer
2021	Ayuda Babes	Tet
2022	Yorme: The Isko Domagoso Story	Dindin

=== Television ===
Year	Title	Role
2002	!Oka Tokat	Bona
2007	Whammy! Push Your Luck	Himself/Guest
2010–2011	Comedy Bar	Himself/host
2012	Extra Challenge	Himself/Guest
2012	Sarah G. Live	Himself/Guest
2012	Gandang Gabi Vice	Himself/Guest
2013	Wowowillie	Himself/host
2013	Celebrity Bluff	Himself/Guest
2013	Kapuso Mo, Jessica Soho	Himself
2013	Picture! Picture!	Himself/Guest
2013	Sunday All Stars	Himself/Guest
2014	Tunay Na Buhay	Himself
2014	Chef Boy Logro: Kusina Master	Himself/Guest
2014	Sarap Diva	Himself/Guest
2014	Sunday All Stars	Himself/Guest
2015	Eat Bulaga!	Himself
2015	Tonight with Arnold Clavio	Himself/Guest
2016	Sunday PinaSaya	Himself/Guest
2016	Rated K	Himself/Guest
2023–2024	FPJ's Batang Quiapo	Elsa

== Discography ==
=== Singles ===
Title	Release date	Composer(s)	Album	Ref(s)
"The Door"	November 14, 2014	Francis Kiko Salazar, Blanktape	Non-album singles	
"May Himala Pala"	February 5, 2021	Joven Tan	Non-album singles	
