= Mario O'Hara =

Filipino television and film director; screenwriter

- Born: Mario Herrero O'Hara; April 20, 1946; Zamboanga City, Philippines
- Died: June 26, 2012 (aged 66); Pasay, Philippines
- Education: Adamson University
- Occupations: Film director, actor, screenwriter, theater director, playwright, radio announcer
- Years active: 1963–2012
- Parent(s): Jaime O'Hara (father); Basilisa Herrero (mother)
- Relatives: Jerry O'Hara; Edwin O'Hara

Mario Herrero O'Hara (April 20, 1946 – June 26, 2012) was a Filipino film director, film producer and screenwriter known for his sense of realism often with dark but realistic social messages.

== Early life ==
He was born in Zamboanga City on April 20, 1946. His mother, Basilisa Herrero, was a native of Ozamiz in Misamis Occidental and had Spanish ancestry. His father, Jaime O'Hara was the son of an Irish-American Thomasite, and a former member of the University of the Philippines Dramatic club. Mario had eight brothers and three sisters, including Edwin (1948–2007), who was a television director. Because Jaime was the son of an American citizen, Mario's family was eligible to apply for US citizenship; however, Mario rejected any such offers.

From Zamboanga City, the O'Haras moved to a middle-class suburb in Pasay; behind their house was a slum area, and Mario claimed that some of his works were inspired by real-life incidents that happened there. He took up Chemical Engineering at the Adamson University, simultaneously auditioning for a radio show sponsored by Procter and Gamble. At the age of 17, Mario stopped attending classes in 1963 to focus on his work in radio drama with the Manila Broadcasting Company (MBC) and DZRH.

== Career ==
=== 1963–1979 ===
From 1963 to 1970, besides working at radio stations, he also worked for channels 2 and 11. He directed the drama series Lovingly Yours, Helen, Flordeluna (featuring Janice de Belen) and Alitaptap sa Gabing Madilim.

While at the MBC, he met Lino Brocka, who offered him a job as an announcer for his TV drama anthology Balintataw. Since then, O'Hara and Brocka frequently collaborated. Brocka offered O'Hara a role in his 1971 film Tubog sa Ginto ("Goldplated") and also cast him in dramatic productions at the Philippine Educational Theater Alliance (PETA). O'Hara, in turn, wrote the screenplay for Brocka's Weighed but Found Wanting (Tinimbang Ka Ngunit Kulang, 1974), about life in a small provincial town; in the movie, he also played the role of Bertong Ketongin (Berto the Leper) vis-a-vis Lolita Rodriguez, who played Berto's love interest Koala.

He wrote a teleplay which became the basis for Brocka's Insiang (1976), which is about a woman who was raped by her stepfather. O'Hara claimed that the script was inspired by a real story which happened in the slum behind their backyard. The film later went on to be screened at the Director's Fortnight, the first time that a Filipino film was accorded such honor at the Cannes Film Festival.

On the same year, he directed Tatlong Taong Walang Diyos (Three Godless Years), considered as O'Hara's masterpiece, which starred Nora Aunor; the movie was the first of many other collaborations O'Hara and Aunor had. The movie earned O'Hara his first nomination (for Best Director) at the FAMAS Awards.

From 1976 to 1980, he directed Alma Moreno's weekly TV drama anthology Alindog, and Rosa Rosal's Weekly TV drama anthology Ulila for BBC Channel 2.

In 1978, he wrote the screenplay for Lino Brocka's Rubia Servos. This led to the first award in his film career (Best Screenplay at the Metro Manila Film Festival).

=== 1980s ===
During the 1980s, O'Hara collaborated anew with Nora Aunor: Kastilyong Buhangin ("Castle of Sand", 1981), featuring Lito Lapid; Bakit Bughaw ang Langit? ("Why is the sky blue?", 1981), which gave O'Hara a FAMAS nomination for Best Director; and Condemned (1984). For Bulaklak sa City Jail (Flowers of City Jail, 1984), both O'Hara and Aunor garnered wins at the Metro Manila Film Festival (for Best Director and Best Actress, respectively); nominations at the Gawad Urian; and a nomination for O'Hara and a win for Aunor at the FAMAS Awards.

In 1986, after the first EDSA Revolution, he filmed Bagong Hari ("New King") starring Dan Alvaro. The film was censored by the MTRCB and enjoyed a limited run in the theaters after an appeal with the MTRCB was overturned.

=== 1990s ===
Under the auspices of Lily Monteverde and her pito-pito system (literally, seven-seven, wherein a filmmaker is given a modest budget to shoot a film in 7 days and complete 7 days of post-production, hence the name), O'Hara created two films in just single span of the allowed time.

The first pito-pito was the drama Babae sa Bubungang Lata featuring veteran actress Anita Linda and set at the Manila North Cemetery.

The second one was the historical fantasy fiction Sisa. It is loosely based on the life of Philippine national hero Jose Rizal and the Sisa, a character in Rizal's novel Noli Me Tangere; in the movie, both Rizal and Sisa met and shared scenes.

=== 2000s–2012 ===
O'Hara's 2004 film Babae sa Breakwater addressed issues of poverty in Manila and was met with some considerable success.

In 2010, he filmed Ang Paglilitis ni Andres Bonifacio (The Trial of Andres Bonifacio), which entered the Director's Showcase category of the Cinemalaya film festival. It was his last movie.

In 2011, he worked with Nora Aunor on the miniseries Sa Ngalan ng Ina (In the Name of the Mother) for TV5.

When not doing films, he wrote, directed and acted in a number of plays. He has collaborated with the Tanghalang Pilipino and Philippine Educational Theater Alliance theater groups. He was supervising the production of his play "Stageshow", which is scheduled in October 2012, up until he was confined in the hospital until his death.

== Death ==
He was admitted at the San Juan de Dios Hospital in Pasay, Philippines, on June 15, 2012, to seek treatment for leukemia. Because he was a practicing Jehovah's Witness, he refused to have a blood transfusion, but relented on undergoing chemotherapy.

He succumbed to the disease eleven days later, on June 26, 2012, at age 66.

== Filmography ==
NB: Official English titles (if available) are under "Title"; literal translations are under "Notes"

Year	Film	Functioned as			Notes
Year	Film	Director	Writer	Actor	Notes
2012	Sa Ngalan ng Ina (TV series)	Yes			Translation: "In the name of the mother". Co-directed with Jon Red
2010	Ang paglilitis ni Andres Bonifacio	Yes	Yes		Translation: "The Trial of Andres Bonifacio"; Presented at the 2010 Cinemalaya Film Festival - Directors' Showcase
2003	Babae sa Breakwater (Woman at the Breakwater)	Yes	Yes		Cinemanila International Film Festival - Best Director (nominated); Gawad Urian - Best Direction and Best Screenplay (nominated); Young Critics' Circle - Best Screenplay (nominated)
2000	Pangarap ng Puso (Demons)	Yes	Yes		Translation: "the dream of the heart" Co-written with Red de Castro and Rosario Cruz Lucero. Uses poems by Amado Hernandez, Florentino Collantes and Denise O'Hara
1999	Sindak	Yes			Translation: "Terror"
1999	Sisa	Yes	Yes		Based on the character in Jose Rizal's novel Noli me Tangere. Young Critics Circle - Best Direction (won), Best Screenplay (won)
1998	Babae sa Bubungang Lata (Woman on a Tin Roof)	Yes	Yes		adapted from a play by Agapito Joaquin
1997	Manananggal in Manila	Yes			"Manananggal" refers to a winged vampire-like mythical creature in Philippine folklore (usually a woman) whose body separates from the lower trunk
1997	Mama Dito sa Aking Puso (Mother in My Heart)		Yes		Directed by Frank Rivera
1994	The Fatima Buen Story	Yes			Gawad Urian - Best Director (won)
1994	Johnny Tinoso and the Proud Beauty	Yes			
1990	Ibong Maya	Yes			Television film
1989	Gabriela			Yes	As Ador
1987	Tatlong Ina, Isang Anak (Three Mothers, One Child)	Yes	Yes		co-written with Frank Garcia
1987	Takot Ako, Eh!	Yes	Yes		Translation: "I'm afraid, eh!" Co-written with Tito Rey
1987	Prinsesang Gusgusin	Yes			Translation: "Scruffy Princess"
1986	Halimaw (segment "Halimaw sa Banga")	Yes		Yes	As "Abe"; Other segments directed by Christopher de Leon; Metro Manila Film Festival - Best Director (won); Main title means "monster", while the segment title translates to "monster in the big jar"
1986	Bagong Hari	Yes		Translation: "New King"	Gawad Urian - Best Direction (nominated)
1985	Bed Sins	Yes			
1984	Bulaklak sa City Jail	Yes			Translation: "The Flower in City Jail"; FAMAS Awards - Best Director (nominated); Gawad Uwian - Best Director (nominated); Metro Manila Film Festival - Best Director (won)
1984	Condemned	Yes	Yes		co-written with Jose Javier Reyes
1984	Ibulong Mo sa Puso	Yes			Translation: Whisper to the Heart
1983	To Mama with Love	Yes			
1983	Uhaw sa Pag-ibig	Yes			Translation "thirst/thirsty for love"
1981	Gaano Kita Kamahal	Yes			Translation: How much do I love you
1981	Bakit Bughaw ang Langit?	Yes	Yes		Translation: "Why is the sky blue"? Co-written with Lydia Collantes Villegas and Greg Tadeo; FAMAS Awards - Best Director (nominated)
1980	Kastilyong Buhangin	Yes	Yes		Translation: "Sandcastles"
1980	Kasal?		Yes		Translation: "Wedding?"; Directed by Laurice Guillen
1979	Marcelino pan y vino (TV movie)	Yes			
1978	Rubia Servios		Yes		Directed by Lino Brocka; Metro Manila Film Festival - Best Screenplay (won)
1978	Gumising Ka, Maruja			Yes	Translation: "Wake up, Maruja"; As Freddie; Directed by Lino Brocka
1977	Hayop sa Hayop		Yes		Translation: "An animal for an animal" Directed by Lino Brocka
1977	Mga Bilanggong Birhen	Yes	Yes		Translation: "The Captive Virgins"; Co-directed with Romy Suzara
1977	Tahan na, Empoy, Tahan			Yes	Translation: "Be still, Empoy, be still" Directed by Lino Brocka
1975	Maynila sa Mga Kuko ng Liwanag (Manila in the Claws of Neon)			Yes	Title literally means "Manila in the Claws of Light"; Directed by Lino Brocka. Based on the novel by Edgardo Reyes.
1976	Tatlong Taóng Walang Diyos (Three Godless Years)	Yes	Yes		Can also be translated as "Three Years Without God"; FAMAS Awards - Best Director (nominated); NB: accent placed on the "o" in "Taong" because there is a similar Tagalog word (with a different accent) which means "person/human being" (táo/táong)
1976	Insiang		Yes		As "Berto the Leper". Directed by Lino Brocka. Co-written with Lamberto E. Aquino
1976	Mortal	Yes	Yes		
1974	Tinimbang Ka Ngunit Kulang (You Are Weighed But Found Wanting)		Yes	Yes	As Berto the Leper (Bertong Ketongin); Directed by and co-written with Lino Brocka
1974	Tatlo Dalawa Isa		Yes	Yes	Translation: "Three, Two One"; Acting as Miguelito in the "Bukas, Madilim Bukas" (Tomorrow, It's Dark Tomorrow) segment Directed by Lino Brocka
1971	Lumuha Pati Mga Anghel			Yes	Translation: "Even Angels Cried"; Directed by Lino Brocka
1971	Cadena de Amor			Yes	Directed by Lino Brocka
1971	Tubog sa Ginto			Yes	Translation: "Goldplated"; As Diego; Directed by Lino Brocka
1971	Stardoom			Yes	As Emong Perez. Directed by Lino Brocka
1970	Santiago!			Yes	As "Diego". Directed by Lino Brocka

== Awards and nominations ==
- Cinemalaya Independent Film Festival
  - 2010 - Ang Paglilitis ni Andres Bonifacio - Best Director (nominated)
- Cinemanila International Film Festival
  - 2004 - Netpac Award (awarded)- For a lifetime of achievement and dedication to the advancement of Philippine films, which are lauded and appreciated by film audiences around the world.
  - 2004 - Babae sa Breakwater - Lino Brocka Award/Best Director (nominated)
  - 2000 - Lifetime Achievement Award (awarded)
- Cinema One Digital Film Festival (Cinema One Originals)
  - 2011 - Honorary Awardees for Pioneering Efforts in Independent Cinema
- FAMAS Awards
  - 1985 - Bulaklak ng City Jail - Best Director (nominated)
  - 1982 - Bakit bughaw ang langit? - Best Director (nominated)
  - 1979 - Gumising Ka, Maruja - Best Supporting Actor (nominated)
  - 1977 - Tatlong taong walang Diyos - Best Director (nominated)
  - 1975 - Tinimbang Ka Ngunit Kulang - Best Supporting Actor (nominated)
  - 1972 - Stardoom - Best Supporting Actor (nominated)
  - 1971 - Tubog sa Ginto - Best Supporting Actor (nominated)
- Gawad Urian Awards
  - 2011 - Babae sa Breakwater - Dekada Award: Best Film of the Decade (Natatanging Pelikula ng Dekada) (won)
  - 2004 - Babae sa Breakwater - Best Direction (Pinakamahusay na Direksyon) (nominated)
  - 2004 - Babae sa Breakwater - Best Screenplay (Pinakamahusay na Dulang Pampelikula) (nominated)
  - 1995 - Fatima Buen Story - Best Direction (Pinakamahusay na Direksyon) (won)
  - 1987 - Bagong Hari - Best Direction (Pinakamahusay na Direksyon) (nominated)
  - 1985 - Bulaklak ng City Jail - Best Direction (Pinakamahusay na Direksyon) (nominated)
  - 1977 - Insiang - Best Screenplay (Pinakamahusay na Dulang Pampelikula) (nominated with Lamberto E. Antonio)
- Golden Screen Awards, Philippines
  - 2006 - Gawad Lino Brocka Award (won)
- Metro Manila Film Festival
  - 1986 - Halimaw sa Banga - Best Director (won)
  - 1986 - Halimaw sa Banga - Best Actor (won)
  - 1984 - Bulaklak ng City Jail - Best Director (won)
  - 1978 - Rubia Servios - Best Screenplay (won)
- Singapore International Film Festival
  - 2001 - Pangarap ng Puso - Best Asian Feature Film (nominated)
- Young Critics Circle, Philippines
  - 2004 - Babae sa Breakwater - Best Film (won)
  - 2004 - Babae sa Breakwater - Best Screenplay (won)
  - 2000 - Sisa - Best Film (won)
  - 2000 - Sisa - Best Screenplay (won)
  - 1999 - Babae sa Bubungang Lata - Best Film (nominated
  - 1999 - Babae sa Bubungang Lata - Best Screenplay (nominated)
- National Artist of the Philippines
  - year/s unknown - nominated but bypassed
