= Game ng Bayan =

- Title card
- Genre: Game show
- Directed by: Jon Raymund Moll
- Presented by: Robin Padilla; Alex Gonzaga; Eric Nicolas; Mary Jean Lastimosa; Negi
- Country of origin: Philippines
- Original language: Tagalog
- No. of episodes: 28

Production
- Camera setup: Multiple-camera setup
- Running time: 45 minutes
- Production companies: ABS-CBN Studios; RCP Productions

Original release
- Network: ABS-CBN
- Release: March 7 – April 15, 2016

Game ng Bayan (abbreviated as GNB, lit. game of the nation) is a Philippine television game show broadcast by ABS-CBN. Hosted by Robin Padilla, Alex Gonzaga, Eric Nicolas, Mary Jean Lastimosa and Negi, it aired on the network's Kapamilya Gold line up from March 7 to April 15, 2016, replacing the fifth season of Kapamilya, Deal or No Deal and was replaced by My Super D.

Each of the game show's episode is held in a different barangay where contestants are usually residents of the selected locality.

== Hosts ==
=== Main hosts ===
- Robin Padilla
- Alex Gonzaga
- Eric Nicolas
- Mary Jean Lastimosa
- Negi

=== Guest co-host ===
- Angelica Panganiban (substitute host for Gonzaga)

== Game Segments ==
- Koloreta
- Ang Dami Mong Alam
- Buksan Ang Plato
- Storya ng Buhay
- Barangay Games
- Barangay Ultimate Showdown (Friday)

== Ratings ==
Episode	Date	Nationwide (Kantar Media-TNS)	Mega Manila (AGB-Nielsen)
1	March 7, 2016	10.6%	8.2%
2	March 8, 2016	11.6%	6.6%
3	March 9, 2016	N/A	7.0%
4	March 10, 2016	8.9%	8.8%
5	March 11, 2016	10.2%	7.5%
6	March 14, 2016	8.2%	6.2%
7	March 15, 2016	9.6%	6.6%
8	March 16, 2016	9.2%	6.9%
9	March 17, 2016	9.6%	6.0%
10	March 18, 2016	7.2%	5.9%
11	March 21, 2016	7.5%	5.5%
12	March 22, 2016	8.0%	7.2%
13	March 23, 2016	8.1%	5.5%
14	March 28, 2016	9.1%	6.0%
15	March 29, 2016	10.0%	7.0%
16	March 30, 2016	8.6%	5.1%
17	March 31, 2016	N/A	5.8%
18	April 1, 2016	N/A	5.9%
19	April 4, 2016	7.4%	5.8%
20	April 5, 2016	9.0%	6.2%
21	April 6, 2016	7.1%	6.1%
22	April 7, 2016	7.8%	5.7%
23	April 8, 2016	8.4%	5.5%
24	April 11, 2016	10.2%	5.7%
25	April 12, 2016	9.3%	6.6%
26	April 13, 2016	9.6%	6.6%
27	April 14, 2016	N/A	6.6%
28	April 15, 2016	8.9%	5.4%
Average		%	6.35%

== See also ==
- List of programs broadcast by ABS-CBN
