= Allan K. =

Filipino actor and comedian (born 1958)

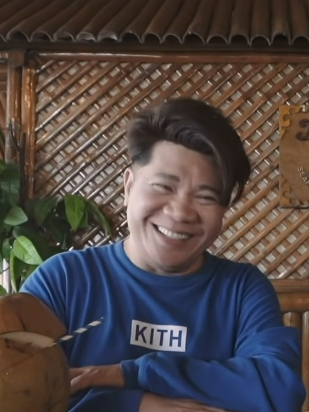
- Allan K. in September 2022
- Born: Alan Quilantang; December 13, 1958 (age 67); Isabela, Negros Occidental, Philippines

Comedy career
- Years active: 1992–present
- Medium: Stand-up; film; television
- Genres: Observational comedy; character comedy; satire
- Subjects: Everyday life; pop culture

Alan Joveness Quilantang (born December 13, 1958), known professionally as Allan K., is a Filipino comedian, television host, actor, and businessman. He is one of the co-hosts of the noontime variety show Eat Bulaga.

Quilantang also previously owned comedy bars Zirkoh and Klownz until their closure during the pandemic in 2020.

== Career ==
=== Early years ===
Quilantang began his professional singing career after he graduated high school and joined a band, performing in bars around Bacolod. In 1984, he flew to Manila to work in sing-along bars as a singer and as a stand-up comedian.

Quilantang was discovered in 1995 through a reporter during a press conference of Eat Bulaga! where the show's impending transfer to GMA Network was announced. The reporter who frequented the place where he worked at that time, asked if there were any new talents to be introduced, then followed up by asking if they had heard of an "Allan K." who performed at The Library—a comedy bar in Malate, Manila. The noontime variety show's producer, Antonio Tuviera, was unaware that his children also frequented the same place, thus, they ended up contacting and visiting the bar on the night after the press conference.

=== 1995–2014 ===
Quilantang's first appearance in Eat Bulaga! was in the segment "Bulagaan" in 1995. He became a regular host of Eat Bulaga! starting with his own segment entitled "Allan Knows Best", attending to the viewers problems and giving out advice.

In 2002, he opened his first comedy bar Klownz in Quezon Avenue. Subsequently, in 2004, he opened Zirkoh—also a comedy bar—in Tomas Morato. They were home to several stand-up comedians such as impersonators Ate Gay and Boobay; comedy duo Jose and Wally; and various other celebrities who had performed there nightly throughout the years.

Alongside Eat Bulaga!, Quilantang also hosted All Star K! together with singer and host Jaya from 2004 to 2009. Shortly after the show concluded, he co-hosted once more with Jaya in BandaOke! until 2010. Later in the same year, Quilantang co-hosted the comedy talent show Comedy Bar with actress and fellow comedian Eugene Domingo.

In 2014, Quilantang was inducted by German Moreno into the Eastwood City Walk of Fame.

=== 2020 ===
Due to the COVID-19 pandemic in 2020, Quilantang closed down his comedy bars Klownz and Zirkoh. After trying to keep his businesses afloat, he soon filed for bankruptcy in July because of accumulating expenses and increasing losses. On the December 12, 2020, segment of "Bawal Judgmental" on Eat Bulaga!, Quilantang and his co-host Wally Bayola publicly shared that they were afflicted with COVID-19. In his statement, he said that he was brought to the hospital because of persistent symptoms, leading to his confinement in an intensive care unit (ICU) for 3 days. Eat Bulaga! pillar Vic Sotto revealed for the first time that the doctors told him that Quilantang "doesn't look good", describing how critical his situation was. Quilantang did not undergo intubation and eventually recovered.

=== 2021–present ===
In 2021 as he recovered from the aftermath of the pandemic, Quilantang opened a Japanese restaurant and a new comedy bar closely resembling its predecessor's name. In November 2022, he launched another comedy bar also similarly resembling the name of his former business.

== Personal life ==
The name Allan K. was derived from a play on his surname Quilantang by his gay colleagues who called him Allan "Qui" (Tagalog: [ˈki]) which later evolved to be pronounced as Allan "K" (Tagalog: [ˈkeɪ]); he eventually took a liking to how it sounded and used it as his stage name.

Quilantang is gay. In an interview in 2016, he revealed to the press about having an ongoing relationship with an undisclosed Filipino-British man who he said was a reality show winner.

During the COVID-19 pandemic in 2020, Quilantang's brother died in May and his sister in July, but with the quarantine and protocols in place, no funerals were held for both siblings; in July he permanently shut down his businesses; and ultimately in August when he acquired a severe case of COVID-19, facing death. Quilantang described the year as "seemingly cursed".

In an Instagram post, Quilantang announced the death of his brother in October 2021.

In a special episode of "Bawal Judgmental" on Eat Bulaga! on December 25, 2021, Quilantang admitted that he had a relationship with a woman in his early days in Bacolod to conceal his sexuality. For the first time, he revealed learning about the possibility of him having a child through a psychic he met where he performed. With the persuasion of the other hosts, Quilantang publicly appealed to the woman to confirm whether he did have a child with her and have them tested through DNA matching; he also stated that he is open to taking responsibility for the child whom he estimated to be at least 30 years old at the time.

== Filmography ==
=== Film ===
Year	Title	Role
1995	Run Barbi Run	Himself/Impersonator
1996	Rubberman	Baldo
1996	Hindi Ako Ander... Itanong Mo Kay Kumander	Roberta
1997	Onyok Tigasin	Candy
1997	Sabi Mo Mahal Mo Ako, Wala ng Bawian	Lorie
1999	Bilib Ako Sa'yo	Yaya
1999	Ms. Kristina Moran: Babaeng Palaban	
2000	Bakit Ba Ganyan? (Ewan Ko Nga Ba, Darling)	Junina
2001	Bahay ni Lola	Frank
2002	Bakit Papa	Allan
2002	Singsing ni Lola	Guard
2003	Fantastic Man	Resto owner
2005	Ispiritista: Itay, May Moomoo!	Allan
2005	Lovestruck	Allan
2006	Enteng Kabisote 3: Okay Ka, Fairy Ko: The Legend Goes On and On and On	Ina Magenta
2006	TxT	Quiapo Seller 1
2007	Pasukob	Virgie
2008	Urduja	Tarsir (voice)
2009	Ang Darling Kong Aswang	Pasiyonista
2012	D' Kilabots Pogi Brothers Weh?!?	Security Guard
2016	Enteng Kabisote 10 and the Abangers	Fake Faye
2018	Jack Em Popoy: The Puliscredibles	Himself

=== Television ===
Year	Title	Role
1995–present	Eat Bulaga!	Co-host
1998–2004	Sing Galing!	Host
1999–2001	1 for 3	Gorgonio "Gorgy" Magalpoc
2000	Beh Bote Nga	Himself / Guest
2000	GMA Telecine Specials	Various
2000	Easy Money: Ang Cash Ng Bayan	Host
2002	The Weakest Link	Host
2004–2009	All-Star K!	Host
2009–2010	BandaOke	Host
2010–2011	Comedy Bar	Host
2014	Eat Bulaga Lenten Special: Ilaw Ng Panahon	Julie
2014	Bubble Gang	Himself
2015	Eat Bulaga Lenten Special: Sukli ng Pagmamahal	Lino
2015	Vampire ang Daddy Ko	Diva
2015	Sabado Badoo	Cameo footage featured
2016	Eat Bulaga Lenten Special: Walang Kapalit	Gil
2016	Kalyeserye	Mrs. Caitlyn "Dudang" Smash
2016	Superstar Duets	Himself / Judge
2017	Eat Bulaga Lenten Special: Inay	Binet
2021	The Boobay and Tekla Show	Himself
2021; 2025	Sing Galing!	Himself / Judge
2023–2024	E.A.T.	Co-host

== Awards and recognitions ==
Year	Award giving body	Category	Nominated work	Results	Notes
2000	PMPC Star Awards for Television	Best Game Show Host	Sing Galing!	Won	Shared with Ai-Ai delas Alas
2011	PMPC Star Awards for Television	Best Male TV Host	Eat Bulaga!	Won	
2014	Eastwood City Walk of Fame	—N/a	—N/a	Inducted	Recognized by German Moreno

== See also ==
- Ruby Rodriguez
- Toni Rose Gayda
- Pia Guanio
