= Comedy Bar (Philippine TV program) =

Philippine television variety show

- Title card
- Genre: Variety show
- Directed by: Dominic Zapata
- Presented by: Eugene Domingo; Allan K.
- Country of origin: Philippines
- Original language: Tagalog
- No. of episodes: 77

Production
- Production locations: Quezon City, Philippines
- Camera setup: Multiple-camera setup
- Running time: 15–40 minutes
- Production company: GMA Entertainment TV

Original release
- Network: GMA Network
- Release: April 24, 2010 – October 29, 2011

Comedy Bar is a Philippine television variety show broadcast by GMA Network. Hosted by Eugene Domingo and Allan K., it premiered on April 24, 2010. The show concluded on October 29, 2011, with a total of 77 episodes.

The show is streaming online on YouTube.

== Hosts ==
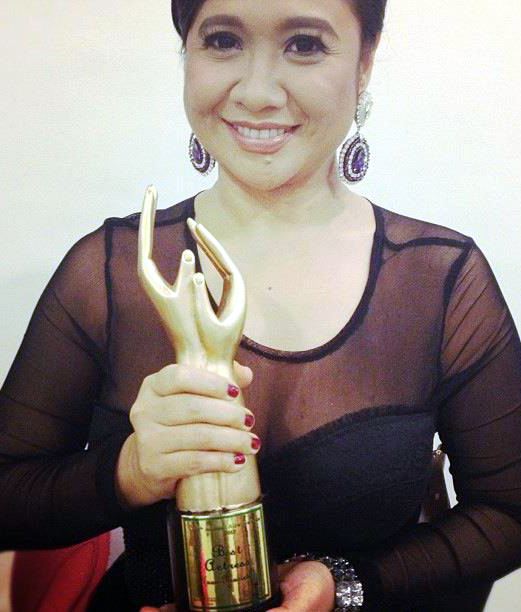
Eugene Domingo serves as the host.

- Eugene Domingo
- Allan K.

Co-hosts

- Tomas Gonzales
- Fabio Ide
- Boobay
- Ate Gay

Band

- Six Feet Long

Guest hosts

- Rufa Mae Quinto
- Carmina Villarroel

== Ratings ==
According to AGB Nielsen Philippines' Mega Manila household television ratings, the pilot episode of Comedy Bar earned a 10.3% rating. The final episode scored a 2.7% rating.

== Accolades ==
Accolades received by Comedy Bar
Year	Award	Category	Recipient	Result	Ref.
2011	25th PMPC Star Awards for Television	Best Variety Show	Comedy Bar	Nominated	
2011	25th PMPC Star Awards for Television	Best Female TV Host	Eugene Domingo	Nominated	
