= 2006 Metro Manila Film Festival =

Film festival edition

- Date: December 25, 2006 to January 7, 2007
- Site: Manila

Highlights
- Best Picture: Enteng Kabisote 3: Okay Ka, Fairy Ko: The Legend Goes On and On and On
- Most awards: Kasal, Kasali, Kasalo (10)

Television coverage
- Network: ABC 5

The 32nd Metro Manila Film Festival was held in Manila, Philippines, from December 25, 2006 to January 7, 2007.

Star Cinema's Kasal, Kasali, Kasalo received the top prizes and went home with the most trophies at the 2006 Metro Manila Film Festival during its awarding ceremony at the Aliw Theater in Pasay. The film, which starred real-life couple Judy Ann Santos and Ryan Agoncillo, won some of the major awards including the Second Best Picture, Best Actress for Santos, Best Director for Jose Javier Reyes, Best Supporting Actress for Gina Pareño, Most Gender-Sensitive Film, and the Gatpuno Antonio J. Villegas Cultural Awards among others. In addition, the film's theme song, "Hawak Kamay" composed and sung by Pinoy Dream Academy Grand Star Dreamer Yeng Constantino, won the Best Original Theme Song. The Best Picture award is received by OctoArts Films and M-Zet Production's third installment of Enteng Kabisote film series entitled Enteng Kabisote 3: Okay Ka, Fairy Ko: The Legend Goes On and On and On.

The Best Actor and Best Supporting Actor awards went to Ligalig's actor, producer, and director Cesar Montano and second-time awardee Johnny Delgado respectively.

Other awardees are Shake, Rattle and Roll 8's Nash Aguas for Best Child Performer, Regal Films' Mano Po 5: Gua Ai Di receiving five awards, and CM Films' Ligalig and Violett Films' Tatlong Baraha which received three awards each.

== Entries ==
There were originally ten entries in this year's edition of the annual film festival but OctoArts Films' Short Time backed out at the last minute, leaving the field to just nine. As a result of this, the Executive Committee of MMFFP decided to simultaneously show all the entries on December 25 compared to the past years when some of the films are shown one week after.

| Title | Starring | Studio | Director | Genre |
|---|---|---|---|---|
| Enteng Kabisote 3: Okay Ka, Fairy Ko: The Legend Goes On and On and On | Vic Sotto, Kristine Hermosa, Bing Loyzaga, Oyo Boy Sotto, G. Toengi, Jose Manalo, Aiza Seguerra, Antonio Aquitania, Allan K. | OctoArts Films and M-Zet Productions | Tony Y. Reyes | Action, Comedy, Family, Fantasy |
| Kasal, Kasali, Kasalo | Judy Ann Santos, Ryan Agoncillo, Gina Pareño, Gloria Diaz, Ariel Ureta, AJ Perez | Star Cinema | Jose Javier Reyes | Comedy, Romance |
| Ligalig | Cesar Montano, Sunshine Cruz, Celia Rodriguez, Johnny Delgado, Katya Santos, Bayani Agbayani, John Regala, Rebecca Lusterio, Rommel Montano, Alvin Anson, Kalila Aguilos, Gwen Garci | CM Films | Cesar Montano | Action, Crime, Drama |
| Mano Po 5: Gua Ai Di | Richard Gutierrez, Angel Locsin, Lorna Tolentino, Gina Alajar, Kamilah Daquigan, Boots Anson-Roa, Christian Bautista | Regal Films | Joel Lamangan | Comedy, Drama, Romance |
| Matakot Ka sa Karma | Rica Peralejo, Angelica Panganiban, Gretchen Barretto, Tanya Garcia, Bianca King, Ana Capri | Canary Films and OctoArts Films | Jose Javier Reyes | Horror |
| Shake, Rattle and Roll 8 | Episode 1: "13th Floor" - Bearwin Meily, Keanna Reeves, Roxanne Guinoo, Joseph Bitangcol, Janus Del Prado; Episode 2: "Yaya" - Sheryl Cruz, Iza Calzado, TJ Trinidad, Nene Tamayo, Nash Aguas, Boom Antonio, Debraliz Vallasote; Episode 3: "LRT" - Manilyn Reynes, Keempee de Leon, Eugene Domingo, Miko Palanca, IC Mendoza, Mhyco Aquino, Sergio Garcia, Cassandra Ponti, Ehra Madrigal, Empress Schuck, Dino Imperial | Regal Films | Mike Tuviera, Rahyan Carlos and Topel Lee | Horror, Comedy |
| Super Noypi | John Prats, Sandara Park, Polo Ravales, Katrina Halili, Jennylyn Mercado, Mark Herras, Monsour del Rosario, Aubrey Miles, Karla Estrada, Jao Mapa, Mon Confiado, Allan Paule | Regal Films | Quark Henares | Action, Adventure, Fantasy, Superhero |
| Tatlong Baraha | Lito Lapid, Mark Lapid, Maynard Lapid, Phoemela Barranda, Girlie Revilla, Jackie Rice, Bearwin Meily, Monsour del Rosario | Violett Films | Toto Natividad | Action |
| Zsazsa Zaturnnah Ze Moveeh | Pops Fernandez, Rustom Padilla, Alfred Vargas, Pauleen Luna, Chokoleit, Christian Vasquez, Say Alonzo, Zsa Zsa Padilla | Regal Films | Joel Lamangan | Action, Adventure, Comedy, Superhero |

== Winners and nominees ==
=== Awards ===
Winners are listed first and highlighted in boldface.

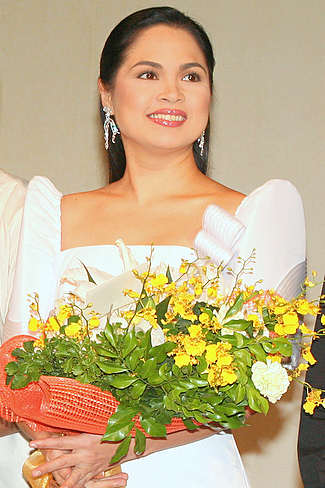
Judy Ann Santos, Best Actress winner

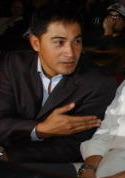
Cesar Montano, Best Actor winner

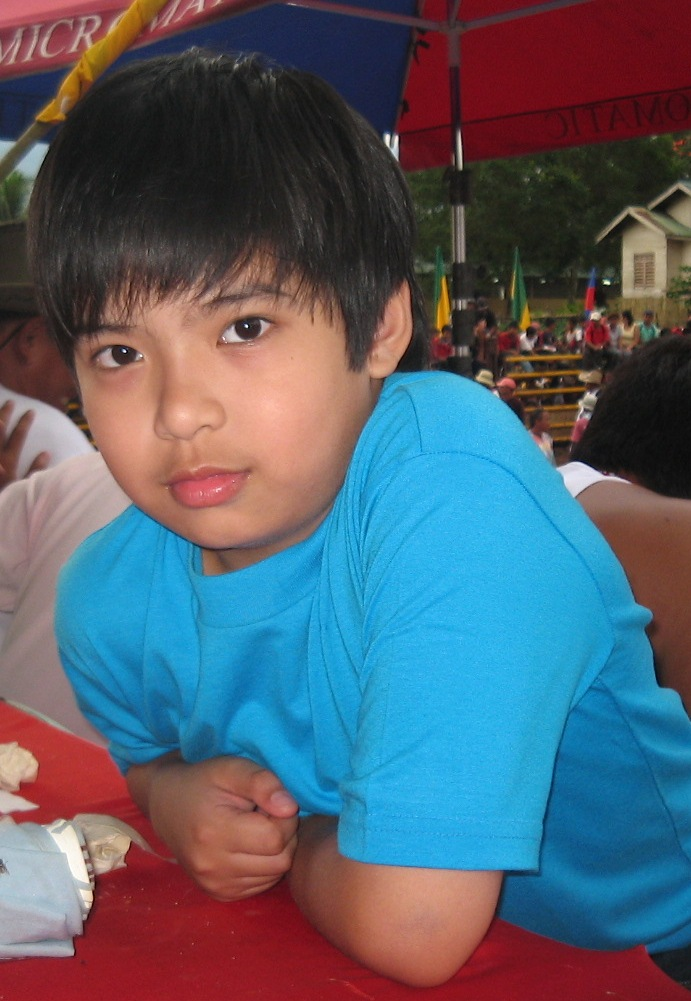
Nash Aguas, Best Child Performer winner

| Best Picture | Best Director |
|---|---|
| **Enteng Kabisote 3: Okay Ka, Fairy Ko: The Legend Goes On and On and On - Octoarts Films and M-Zet Productions**; Kasal, Kasali, Kasalo - Star Cinema (2nd Best Picture); Shake, Rattle and Roll 8 Regal Films (3rd Best Picture); Ligalig - CM Films; Mano Po 5: Gua Ai Di - Regal Films; ZsaZsa Zaturnah Ze Moveeh - Regal Films; Matakot Ka sa Karma - Octoarts Films; Super Noypi - Regal Films; Tatlong Baraha - Violett Films | **José Javier Reyes - Kasal, Kasali, Kasalo** |
| Best Actor | Best Actress |
| **Cesar Montano – Ligalig** | **Judy Ann Santos – Kasal, Kasali, Kasalo** |
| Best Supporting Actor | Best Supporting Actress |
| **Johnny Delgado - Ligalig** | **Gina Pareño - Kasal, Kasali, Kasalo** |
| Best Cinematography | Best Production Design |
| **Charlie Peralta - Mano Po 5: Gua Ai Di** | **Edgar Martin Littaua - Mano Po 5: Gua Ai Di** |
| Best Child Performer | Best Editing |
| **Nash Aguas - Shake, Rattle and Roll 8** | **Jason Cahapay - Ligalig** |
| Best Original Story | Best Screenplay |
| **José Javier Reyes - Kasal, Kasali, Kasalo** | **José Javier Reyes - Kasal, Kasali, Kasalo** |
| Best Original Theme Song | Best Musical Score |
| **Yeng Constantino ("Hawak Kamay") - Kasal, Kasali, Kasalo** | **Von De Guzman - Mano Po 5: Gua Ai Di** |
| Best Visual Effects | Best Make-up Artist |
| **Imaginary Friends - Tatlong Baraha** | **Baby Lucero - Tatlong Baraha** |
| Best Sound Recording | Best Float |
| **Ditoy Aguila - Mano Po 5: Gua Ai Di** | **Tatlong Baraha - Violett Films**; Mano Po 5: Gua Ai Di - Regal Films (1st Runner-up); Kasal, Kasali, Kasalo - Star Cinema (2nd Runner-up) |
Most Gender-Sensitive Film
**Kasal, Kasali, Kasalo - Star Cinema**
Gatpuno Antonio J. Villegas Cultural Awards
**Kasal, Kasali, Kasalo - Star Cinema**

== Multiple awards ==
| Awards | Film |
|---|---|
| 10 | Kasal, Kasali, Kasalo |
| 5 | Mano Po 5: Gua Ai Di |
| 3 | Ligalig |
| 3 | Tatlong Baraha |
| 2 | Shake, Rattle and Roll 8 |

== Ceremony Information ==
=== "Best Picture" issue ===
Octoarts Films and M-Zet Production's Enteng Kabisote 3: Okay Ka, Fairy Ko: The Legend Goes On and On and On was declared the Best Picture after festival organizers changed the criteria for the award by giving more weight to "commercial appeal". As it was the only prize that the film won, the decision to let the film receive it becomes the subject of yet another controversy at the festival. Movie producer Star Cinema made a protest to the MMDA and wrote to then MMFF chairman Bayani Fernando, claiming that the movie Kasal, Kasali, Kasalo should have won Best Picture because it topped the final box office.

== Box Office gross ==
| Entry | Gross Ticket Sales | | | | | | |
| Entry | December 25 | December 27 | December 28 | December 29 | January 2 | January 4 | January 7 |
|---|---|---|---|---|---|---|---|
| Kasal, Kasali, Kasalo | ₱ 12,900,000 | ₱ 24,500,000 | ₱ 42,300,000 | ₱ 50,400,000 | ₱ 91,700,000 | ₱ 107,496,737 | ₱ 139,948,494* |
| Enteng Kabisote 3: Okay Ka, Fairy Ko: The Legend Goes On and On and On | ₱ 21,400,000* | ₱ 39,000,000* | ₱ 59,400,000* | ₱ 67,900,000* | ₱ 104,800,000* | ₱ 112,456,584* | ₱ 128,204,489 |
| Shake, Rattle and Roll 8 | ₱ 9,900,000 | ₱ 16,600,000 | ₱ 24,600,000 | ₱ 27,900,000 | ₱ 43,700,000 | ₱ 46,657,732 | ₱ 57,042,995 |
| Matakot Ka sa Karma | ₱ 5,000,000 | ₱ 7,900,000 | ₱ 11,500,000 | ₱ 13,000,000 | ₱ 18,500,000 | ₱ 20,426,950 | ₱ 23,636,219 |
| Mano Po 5: Gua Ai Di | ₱ 1,900,000 | ₱ 5,700,000 | ₱ 9,700,000 | ₱ 11,400,000 | ₱ 17,600,000 | ₱ 19,431,403 | ₱ 22,677,507 |
| Super Noypi | ₱ 4,760,000 | ₱ 8,000,000 | ₱ 10,700,000 | ₱ 11,700,000 | ₱ 16,200,000 | ₱ 17,309,117 | ₱ 19,392,153 |
| ZsaZsa Zaturnnah Ze Moveeh | ₱ 2,900,000 | ₱ 5,000,000 | ₱ 7,000,000 | ₱ 7,700,000 | ₱ 9,900,000 | ₱ 10,643,358 | ₱ 11,675,983 |
| Ligalig | ₱ 1,500,000 | ₱ 2,500,000 | ₱ 3,600,000 | ₱ 4,000,000 | ₱ 6,000,000 | ₱ 6,841,770 | ₱ 7,966,760 |
| Tatlong Baraha | ₱ 1,300,000 | ₱ 2,000,000 | ₱ 2,500,000 | ₱ 2,700,000 | ₱ 3,400,000 | ₱ 3,673,623 | ₱ 3,961,748 |
| | | | | | | TOTAL | ₱ 414,506,348 |

| Preceded by 2005 Metro Manila Film Festival | Metro Manila Film Festival; 2006 | Succeeded by 2007 Metro Manila Film Festival |
