= Lapidus =

Lapidus is a Jewish surname derived from the Biblical Hebrew masculine given name Lapidoth. Notable people with the surname include:

- Adam I. Lapidus (born 1963), American television writer
- Azary Lapidus (born 1958), Russian civil engineer
- Ira M. Lapidus (born 1937), American historian, author and educator
- Jens Lapidus (born 1974), Swedish lawyer and author
- Jay Lapidus (born 1959), American tennis player
- Jodi Lapidus, American biostatistician
- Leon Lapidus (1924–1977), American chemist
- Mark Lapidus (born 1995), Estonian chess player
- Morris Lapidus (1902–2001), American architect
- Ted Lapidus (1929–2008), French fashion designer
- Ben Lapidus, singer from Doylestown, Pennsylvania, contestant on America's Got Talent season 17

== Fictional characters ==
- Frank Lapidus, pilot played by Jeff Fahey, on the ABC television show Lost
- Merc Lapidus, producer played by John Pankow, on the television show Episodes
- Leslie Lapidus, character from the book and film Sophie's Choice
- Ernie Lapidus, operator of "Sincerity Mortuary" on the 1990 television show Good Grief

== See also ==
- Lapides
- Lapid
