= Lapides =

Lapides is a Jewish surname, a variant of Lapidus. Notable people with the surname include:

- Beth Lapides, American comedian
- Julian L. Lapides (1931–2021), American politician
- Paul D. Lapides of Lapides v. Board of Regents of University System of Georgia case
- Sam Lapides, American singer-songwriter and guitarist

== See also ==
- Lapid
