= Medal "In Commemoration of the 850th Anniversary of Moscow" =

Commemorative medal of the Russian Federation

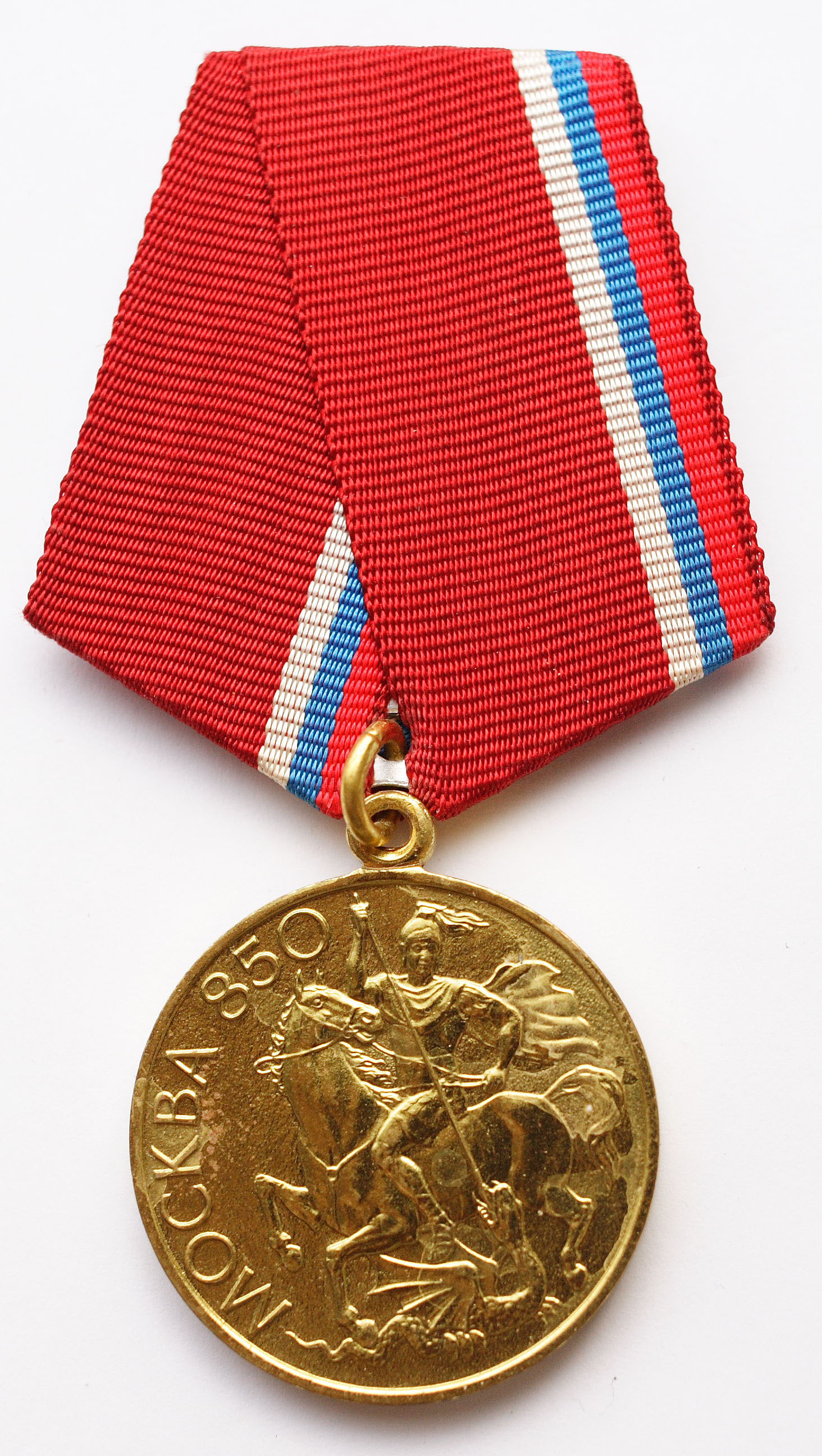
- Medal "In Commemoration of the 850th Anniversary of Moscow" (obverse)
- Type: State Commemorative Medal
- Awarded for: War service and significant contributions to the development of Moscow
- Presented by: Russian Federation
- Eligibility: World War 2 veterans and citizens of the Russian Federation
- Status: No longer awarded
- Established: 26 February 1997
- Ribbon of the Medal "In Commemoration of the 850th Anniversary of Moscow"

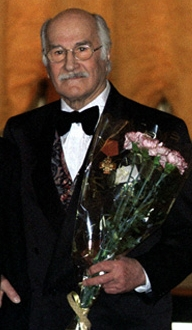
Recipient of the Medal "In Commemoration of the 850th Anniversary of Moscow" Theatre and cinema actor Vladimir Mikhailovich Zeldin.

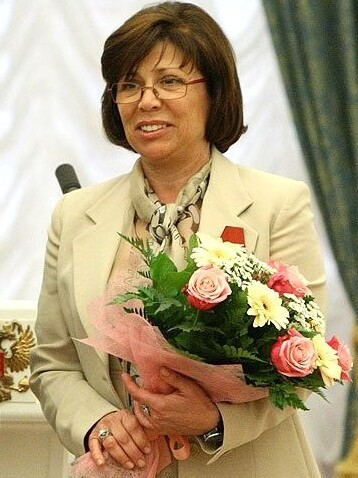
Recipient of the Medal "In Commemoration of the 850th Anniversary of Moscow" Olympic triple gold medalist Irina Rodnina.

The Medal "In Commemoration of the 850th Anniversary of Moscow" (Russian: Медаль «В память 850-летия Москвы») is a commemorative medal of the Russian Federation created to denote the 850th anniversary of the city of Moscow. It was established on 26 February 1997 by Presidential Decree № 132. Its statute was defined on 21 March 1997 by Presidential Decree 223.

== Medal statute ==
The Medal "In Commemoration of the 850th Anniversary of Moscow" is awarded to participants in the defence of Moscow who were awarded a medal for the defence of Moscow, wartime workers who worked in Moscow during the Great Patriotic War of 1941–1945, persons who were awarded the Soviet Medal "In Commemoration of the 800th Anniversary of Moscow"; citizens who have made a significant contribution to the development of the city of Moscow.

Presidential Decree 1099 of 7 September 2010 removed the Medal "In Commemoration of the 850th Anniversary of Moscow" from the list of state awards of the Russian Federation. It is no longer awarded.

== Medal description ==
The Medal "In Commemoration of the 850th Anniversary of Moscow" is a 32 mm in diameter circular brass medal. Its obverse bears the image of Saint George on horseback spearing a dragon. On the left side of the obverse, following the medal circumference, the relief inscription "Moscow 850" (Russian: Москва 850). On the reverse, a laurel wreath over the entire circumference save the very top, in its center the inscription in relief "1147" over the inscription "1997".

The medal is suspended by a ring through the award's suspension loop to a standard Russian pentagonal mount covered with a 24 mm wide overlapping red silk moiré ribbon with 2 mm wide white, blue and red stripes on the right edge.

== Notable recipients (partial list) ==
The individuals below were recipients of the Medal "In Commemoration of the 850th Anniversary of Moscow".

- Rustem Devletovich Zhantiev, scientist
- Azary Abramovich Lapidus, Doctor of Science
- Tatiana Pankratova, order "For Love and Patience" (2016), title "Veteran of Labor" (2003)
- Major GeneralIgor Sergun
- Alexander Prokhorov, physicist
- Igor Ivanov, politician
- Colonel Vladimir Zhirinovsky, politician
- Mikhail Fradkov, politician
- Ramzan Kadyrov, President of Chechnya
- Irina Rodnina figure skater and Olympic gold medalist
- Yury Luzhkov, politician, former mayor of Moscow
- Nikolay Fyodorov, former Justice Minister of Russia and former President of the Chuvash Republic
- General Anatoly Kvashnin
- Boris Lagutin, boxer
- Elina Bystritskaya, actress
- Viktor Gerashchenko, chairman of the Russian Central Bank
- General Yuri Baluyevsky
- Viktor Pugachyov, test pilot
- Alexander Dzasokhov, former head of the Republic of North Ossetia–Alania
- Fleet Admiral Vladimir Kuroyedov
- Alexander Alexeyevich Chekalin, First Deputy Minister of the Interior
- Viktor Sadovnichiy, mathematician
- General Nikolay Bordyuzha, politician
- Vladimir Zeldin, actor
- Aleksey Aleksandrov, lawyer, businessman and politician
- Georgy Boos, businessman, politician and former governor of the Kaliningrad Oblast
- Irina Muravyova actress
- Valery Shumakov, surgeon
- Mikhail Kharit, architect
- Alexander Gavrilenko, cardiac surgeon

== See also ==
- Medal "In Commemoration of the 800th Anniversary of Moscow"
- Awards and decorations of the Russian Federation
- City of Moscow
- Battle of Moscow
