= Gina Pareño =

Filipino actress

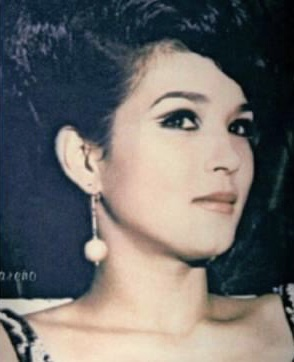
- Pareño in 1971
- Born: Geraldine Acthley; October 20, 1947 (age 79); Pandacan, Manila, Philippines
- Education: Far Eastern University
- Occupation: Actress
- Years active: 1963–present
- Children: 3
- Parent(s): Bouffard Acthley (father); Patricia Dory Ocura (mother)

Gina Pareño (Tagalog: [ˈdʒinɐ paˈrɛɲo]; born Geraldine Acthley, October 20, 1947) is a Filipino actress. She is referred to as the "Queen of Philippine Melodrama", being best known for her award-winning portrayals in films like Kubrador, Serbis and Kasal, Kasali, Kasalo.

Pareño received international recognition for her portrayal of a bet collector in Kubrador (2006), receiving the Best Actress nods at the Osian Cinefan Festival of Asian and Arab Cinema and at the Brussels International Independent Film Festival. Pareño also received critical acclaim at home for her performance in Kasal, Kasali, Kasalo (2006), winning Best Supporting Actress at the FAMAS Awards, Film Academy of the Philippines Awards and Metro Manila Film Festival. For her work in Serbis (2008), she became the first Filipino actress to receive an award from the Asian Film Awards. and from the Pacific Meridian International Film Festival.

In a career spanning six decades, Pareño solidified her reputation as one of the Philippines' most gifted actresses. In 2010, she was honored with a Lifetime Achievement Award at the 26th PMPC Star Awards for Movies. In 2011, Pareño was also recognized as an Artist of the Decade at the 34th Gawad Urian Awards. In 2021, she was honored with an Icon Award at the 4th EDDYS (Entertainment Editors’ Choice) Awards for her contributions to Philippine cinema.

== Early life ==
Pareño was born to a German American father, Bouffard Acthley and a Filipina mother, Patricia Dory Ocura. She had two sons, the eldest passed away and a daughter, Racquel Janica Pareño, who starred with her in “Pahimakas Ng Isang Ahente.”

She grew up in Gagalangin, Tondo, Manila, and studied at Immaculate Conception Academy of Manila. She graduated from Far Eastern University. In the 1960s, she earned selling banana cue at Sampaguita Pictures compound and was also a tricycle driver.

== Career ==
She started her career in the 1960s as an extra in several films and then later on became one of the artists of Sampaguita Pictures. In 1964, she won in "Dance-O-Rama," contest hosted by Boots Anson-Roa.

In 2006, she gained international recognition for her role in Kubrador (The Bet Collector), for which she won the Best Actress awards at the Osian's Cinefan Festival of Asian and Arab Cinema and at the Brussels International Independent Film Festival. Pareño also won the Metro Manila Film Festival Award for Best Supporting Actress as an outspoken and brash mother in the film Kasal, Kasali, Kasalo and then later on received accolades for the same film and category in the FAMAS Awards as well as the Film Academy of the Philippines Awards in that same year.

Pareño and co-actress Jaclyn Jose were cited in the 61st Cannes Film Festival in 2008 for their performance in Brillante Mendoza's Serbis. The film earned several recognitions including a Best Actress award for Pareño at the 6th Pacific Meridian International Film Festival and an Asian Film Award for Best Supporting Actress.

In her TikTok account, she has 1.7 million followers.

== Political views ==
In 1986, Pareño campaigned for the reelection of president Ferdinand Marcos in the 1986 snap election.

== Personal life ==
In the 1990s, she stayed for 18 months in the DARE Drug Rehabilitation Clinic, Manila.

In 2022, Pareño came out as part of the LGBT community.

In a July 17, 2022 YouTube interview with Ogie Diaz, Pareño revealed her intimate partnership with Bong Eraña - "Dra. Bong", former actress Nenita Vidal, b. 1940, who starred in the 50s for Puppy Love (1956) and Banda Uno. She further confided that Vidal was a great comfort in her in drug addiction struggle and finally bestowed her house upon demise.

== Filmography ==
=== Film ===
Year	Film	Role	Notes
1963	Sabina	Sulforina	
1963	Tansan vs. Tarsan		
1963	Ang Class Reunion		
1963	Mga Kwela sa Eskwela		
1963	Ako'y Ibigin Mo, Dalagang Matapang		
1964	Leron Leron Sinta		
1964	Umibig Ay Di Biro		
1964	Mga Batang Bakasyonista		
1964	Mga Batang Artista		
1964	Mga Bata ng Lagim		
1964	Jukebox Jamboree		
1964	Mga Batang Milyonaryo		
1964	Mga Batang Eskwater		
1964	Fighting Waray Sa Ilocos		
1964	Sa Bilis, Walang Kaparis		
1965	Papa um Mamaw		
1965	Isinulat Sa Dugo		
1965	Magnificent Bakya		
1965	Gintong Recuerdo		
1965	Bye-bye Na sa Daddy		
1966	Mama		
1966	Sa Bawa't Lansangan		
1966	Jamboree '66		
1966	Maraming Kulay ng Pag-ibig		
1967	Sitting in the Park		
1967	Let's Dance the Soul		
1967	Way Out in the Country		
1968	Kamatayan Ko Ang Ibigin Ka		
1968	Donata		
1968	May Tampuhan Paminsan Minsan		
1968	Dobol Wedding		
1968	Dalawang Mukha ng Anghel		
1968	Deborah	Deborah	
1968	Elizabeth	Beth	Nominated—FAMAS Award for Best Actress
1968	Doon Pa sa Amin		
1969	Dugo ng Vampira		
1969	Si Darna at ang Planetman	Darna	
1973	Zoom, Zoom, Superman!	The Ape Monster	
1974	Napahiya ka, Ano?		
1974	Krimen: Kayo ang Humatol		Nominated—FAMAS Award for Best Supporting Actress
1974	Bawal: Asawa mo, Asawa ko		
1974	Kayod sa Umaga, Kayod sa Gabi		
1974	Dragon Fire		
1974	Ibilanggo Si... Cavite Boy		
1974	Daigdig ng Sindak at Lagim	Stella	
1975	Mag-ingat Kapag Biyuda Ang Umibig		
1975	Pagsapit ng Dilim		
1976	Tatlong Kasalanan		
1976	Magsikap: Kayod sa Araw, Kayod sa Gabi	Nicki	
1982	Ang Tapang para sa Lahat!	Mirasol	
1984	Bukas Luluhod Ang Mga Tala		Nominated—FAMAS Award for Best Supporting Actress
1984	Working Girls	Nimfa Sugcang	Nominated—Gawad Urian Award for Best Actress
1985	Like Father, Like Son		
1985	Sa Totoo Lang!	Purita	
1986	Ibigay Mo sa Akin ang Bukas		
1986	Halimaw sa Banga		
1988	Natutulog Pa ang Diyos	Patria	Nominated—FAMAS Award for Best Supporting Actress
1988	Celestina Sanchez, Alyas Bubbles – Enforcer: Ativan Gang		
1989	First Lesson		
1989	Kung Tapos Na ang Kailanman		
1990	Anak ni Baby Ama		
1994	The Fatima Buen Story	Frank	Nominated—Gawad Urian Award for Best Supporting Actress
1995	Kirot 2		
1995	Sana Maulit Muli	Lita	
1995	Mangarap Ka	Lucita	
1996	May Nagmamahal Sa'yo	Rosing	Nominated—Gawad Urian Award for Best Supporting Actress
1996	Mula Noon Hanggang Ngayon	Rose	
1996	Radio Romance	Mercedes "Ched" Cordero	
1996	Sariwa	Christie	
1996	Magic Temple	Telang Bayawak	Nominated—FAMAS Award for Best Supporting Actress
1997	Ipaglaban Mo: The Movie Part 2	Loleng	
1997	Hanggang Kailan Kita Mamahalin	Carmen	
1997	Babae sa Dalampasigan		
1997	Kiliti		
1997	Isang Tanong, Isang Sagot		
1998	Ikaw Pa Rin ang Iibigin	Doreen Lerma	
1998	Pagdating ng Panahon		
1998	Hiling	Manang Gracia	
1999	Anak ng Dilim	Pura	
1999	Hey Babe	Madame Lola	
1999	Kiss Mo Ko'	Tita Ampy	
1999	Dito sa Puso Ko	Ligaya's mother	
2001	Booba	Lola Lulubelle	
2003	Til' There Was You	Lagring Boborol	
2004	Bridal Shower	Lourdes	
2004	Masikip sa Dibdib	Lupe	
2005	Ang Lagusan		
2005	Hari ng Sablay		
2006	Wrinkles		
2006	Kubrador	Amy	Amiens International Film Festival Award for Best Actress; Brussels International Independent Film Festival Award for Best Actress; Gawad Urian Award for Best Actress; Golden Screen Award for Best Performance by an Actress in a Leading Role (Drama); Osian's Cinefan Festival of Asian and Arab Cinema Award for Best Actress; Nominated—FAMAS Award for Best Actress; Nominated—Film Academy of the Philippines Award for Best Actress; Nominated—Star Awards for Movies for Movie Actress of the Year
2006	Kasal, Kasali, Kasalo	Belita	FAMAS Award for Best Supporting Actress; Film Academy of the Philippines Award for Best Supporting Actress; Metro Manila Film Festival Award for Best Supporting Actress; Star Awards for Movies for Movie Supporting Actress of the Year; Nominated—Gawad Urian Award for Best Supporting Actress; Nominated—Golden Screen Award Best Performance by an Actress in a Supporting Role (Drama, Musical or Comedy)
2007	Sakal, Sakali, Saklolo	Belita	Nominated—FAMAS Award for Best Supporting Actress; Nominated—Film Academy of the Philippines Award for Best Supporting Actress; Nominated—Golden Screen Award Best Performance by an Actress in a Supporting Role (Drama, Musical or Comedy); Nominated—Star Awards for Movies for Movie Supporting Actress of the Year
2008	Ploning	Intang	Nominated—FAMAS Award for Best Supporting Actress
2008	Service	Nanay Flor	Asian Film Award for Best Supporting Actress; Pacific Meridian International Film Festival Award for Best Actress; Nominated—Gawad Urian Award for Best Actress
2009	Bakal Boys	Lola Salvia	Nominated—Gawad Urian Award for Best Supporting Actress
2009	Love on Line (LOL)	Delilah Alumpihit	
2010	Working Girls	Nymfa Cajanding	
2010	Hating Kapatid	Lola Gerty/Amor	Supporting role
2010	Dalaw	Olga	Nominated—FAMAS Award for Best Supporting Actress; Nominated—Metro Manila Film Festival Award for Best Supporting Actress
2011	The Adventures of Pureza: Queen of the Riles	Mother Baby	
2012	Of All the Things	Mommy Susie Pamintuan	Supporting role
2012	D' Kilabots Pogi Brothers Weh?!	Sophia Kilabot	Supporting role
2012	One More Try	Grace's mother	Nominated—Metro Manila Film Festival Award for Best Supporting Actress
2013	Alfredo S. Lim (The Untold Story)	Fred's mother	
2018	Wander Bra	Wander Lola	
2018	Hintayan ng Langit	Lisang	
2019	Unforgettable	Lola Olive Mijandro	Supporting role
2021	Tililing	Socorro	
2021	Kaka	LolitaKirara/"Lola Kiri/Kiri" Bataan	Supporting role
2022	Apag	Lola Adela	Present in Summer Metro Manila Film Festival
2025	Lola Barang	Lola Barbara	
2025	Lakambini: Gregoria de Jesus	Elder Gregoria de Jesús	
2026	Poon	Berta	

=== Television ===
Year	Title	Role
1987	Working Girls	—
1991–2018	Maalaala Mo Kaya	Various roles (31 episodes)
1995–1996	Familia Zaragoza	Doña Benita Zaragoza
1999–2001	Saan Ka Man Naroroon	Maria Jovita "Marita" del Villa
1999–2000	Labs Ko Si Babe	Felipa Escallon
2001	Da Pilya en Da Pilot	—
2001	Sa Dulo ng Walang Hanggan	Lita Cristobal
2001	Da Body en Da Guard	—
2003–2004	Basta't Kasama Kita	Nanay Ligaya
2005	Mars Ravelo's Darna	Lola Milagros
2007	Love Spell: Sweet Sixty	Doña Rosing
2007	Ysabella	Trinidad "Trining" Mendoza
2007	Gokada Go!	Ms. Gina
2009	Tayong Dalawa	Rita "Lola Gets" Dionisio
2010	Kung Tayo'y Magkakalayo	Petulah "Lola Pet" Crisanto
2010–2011	Mara Clara	Lupe David
2011–2012	My Binondo Girl	Amor Dimaguiba
2012–2013	Lorenzo's Time	Bella "Ate Bel" Nobleza
2013	Toda Max	Gorgonia
2013	Juan dela Cruz	Lola Belen "Loley" Gonzales
2013	Little Champ	Shuning
2013	My Little Juan	Lola Belen "Loley" Gonzales
2013	Wansapanataym: Give Glove on Christmas Day	Cecilia
2014	Honesto	Rosita Layer
2014	Mars Ravelo's Dyesebel	Stella Villamayor
2014	Magpakailanman: Ang Ina na Hindi Malilimutan	Lucing
2014	Magpakailanman: Henyo ng Bangketa	Lola Baby
2015	Let the Love Begin	Maria Anastacia "Lola Tacing" Magtanggol
2015	Magpakailanman: Ang Lolang Mapagbiro	Lola Pina
2015–2016	The Half Sisters	Lisa Valdicañas
2016	FPJ's Ang Probinsyano	Maria Olga "Madam Olga" Fernandez
2016	Born for You	Caridad "Caring" Pelayo
2017	Ikaw Lang ang Iibigin	Lydia Villoria
2018	Magpakailanman: May Forever si Lola	Eloisa
2019	Kara Mia	Corazon
2023	Mga Lihim ni Urduja	Merly Posadas
2026	Sigabo	Anita "Lola Gets" Garcia

== Awards and nominations ==
=== International awards ===
Asian Film Awards
Year	Nominated work	Category	Result
2009	Serbis	Best Supporting Actress	Won

Pacific Meridian International Film Festival
Year	Nominated work	Category	Result
2008	Serbis	Best Actress	Won

Asian Television Award
Year	Nominated work	Category	Result
2007	Maalaala Mo Kaya - Rehas	Best Actress	Won

Amiens International Film Festival
Year	Nominated work	Category	Result
2006	Kubrador	Best Actress	Won

33rd Festival International du Film Indépendant de Bruxelles (Belgium)
Year	Nominated work	Category	Result
2006	Kubrador	Best Actress	Won

Osian's Cinefan Festival of Asian and Arab Cinema
Year	Nominated work	Category	Result
2006	Kubrador	Best Actress	Won

=== Philippine awards ===
FAMAS (Filipino Academy of Movie Arts and Sciences Awards)
Year	Nominated work	Category	Result
2011	Dalaw	Best Supporting Actress	Nominated
2009	Ploning	Best Supporting Actress	Nominated
2008	Sakal, Sakali, Saklolo	Best Supporting Actress	Nominated
2007	Kasal, Kasali, Kasalo	Best Supporting Actress	Won
2007	Kubrador	Best Actress	Nominated
1996	Magic Temple	Best Supporting Actress	Nominated
1989	Natutulog pa ang Diyos	Best Supporting Actress	Nominated
1985	Bukas Luluhod Ang Mga Tala	Best Supporting Actress	Nominated
1975	Krimen: Kayo ang Humatol	Best Actress	Nominated
1969	Elizabeth	Best Actress	Nominated

Luna Awards
Year	Nominated work	Category	Result
2008	Sakal, Sakali, Saklolo	Best Supporting Actress	Nominated
2007	Kasal, Kasali, Kasalo	Best Supporting Actress	Won
2007	Kubrador	Best Actress	Nominated

Gawad Pasado
Year	Nominated work	Category	Result
2007	Kubrador	Best Actress	Nominated
2008	Serbis	Best Actress	Nominated

Gawad Urian
Year	Nominated work	Category	Result
2011		Best Actress of the Decade	Won
2010	Bakal Boys	Best Supporting Actress	Nominated
2009	Serbis	Best Actress	Nominated
2007	Kubrador	Best Actress	Won
2007	Kasal, Kasali, Kasalo	Best Supporting Actress	Nominated
1997	May Nagmamahal Sa'yp	Best Supporting Actress	Nominated
1995	The Fatima Buen Story	Best Supporting Actress	Nominated
1985	Working Girls	Best Actress	Nominated

GMMSF Box-Office Entertainment Awards
Year	Nominated work	Category	Result
2010		Global Achievement by a Filipino Artist	Won

ref:

Golden Screen Awards
Year	Nominated work	Category	Result
2008	Sakal, Sakali, Saklolo	Best Supporting Actress	Nominated
2007	Kasal, Kasali, Kasalo	Best Supporting Actress	Nominated
2007	Kubrador	Best Actress	Won

Metro Manila Film Festival
Year	Nominated work	Category	Result
2012	One More Try	Best Supporting Actress	Nominated
2010	Dalaw	Best Supporting Actress	Nominated
2006	Kasal, Kasali, Kasalo	Best Supporting Actress	Won

Star Awards for Movies
Year	Nominated work	Category	Result
2010		Lifetime Achievement Award	Won
2008	Sakal, Sakali, Saklolo	Best Supporting Actress	Nominated
2007	Kasal, Kasali, Kasalo	Best Supporting Actress	Won
2007	Kubrador	Best Actress	Nominated
