= Lapid =

Lapid may refer to:

- Lapid (surname)
- Lapid (community settlement)
- Type of boat also known as a Balangay
- Ha-Lapid, Jewish Portuguese newspaper
