= List of senators elected in the 2025 Philippine Senate election =

The 2025 Senate election in the Philippines occurred on May 12, 2025, to elect one-half (12 seats) of the Senate. The senators elected in 2025, together with those elected in 2022, comprise the Senate's delegation in the 20th Congress. There were 66 total candidates from 20 parties. Four coalitions were also established: Alyansa para sa Bagong Pilipinas, DuterTen, KiBam, and Makabayan. 82.20% of the registered citizens voted in the elections, the largest turnout in Philippine midterm election history; Alyansa won six seats, DuterTen won four seats, and KiBam won two seats. The proclamation of the 12 winning senators was held on May 17 at the Manila Hotel.

== Background and coalitions ==
The filing of candidacies took place from October 1 to 8, 2024, at the Manila Hotel, where a total of 184 people registered to run for senator. More than a week later, the commission released an initial list of 66 approved candidates. In November, the Philippine Commission on Elections (COMELEC) declared 117 nuisance candidates, 14 of which filed a motion for reconsideration. In December, the COMELEC announced 66 names on their final list. There were multiple senatorial coalitions with two or more candidates running for the Senate. The coalition headed by incumbent President Bongbong Marcos was Alyansa para sa Bagong Pilipinas with 12 candidates, including re-electionists, cabinet members, and former senators. Another primary coalition was DuterTen, 10 senatorial candidates who represented former President Rodrigo Duterte and incumbent Vice President Sara Duterte. Other coalitions included KiBam, consisting of former Senators Bam Aquino and Kiko Pangilinan and Makabayan, a leftist coalition with 11 members consisting of former Philippine House of Representatives members, activists, and advocates.

== Electoral system ==
According to the 1987 constitution and Republic Act No. 7056 in 1992, senators have been elected on a nationwide, at-large basis via a plurality-at-large voting system. A voter has twelve votes and can vote for up to twelve candidates. Votes are tallied nationwide, and the twelve candidates with the highest number of votes are elected to the Senate. A person cannot be a senator if they are not a natural-born Filipino citizen, are less than 35 years old on the day of the election, cannot read and write, are not a registered voter, or have not been a resident of the Philippines for more than two years before election day. The Commission on Elections administers elections for the Senate and the Senate Electoral Tribunal handles election disputes after a senator has taken office.

== Results and composition ==
A total of 825,278,088 valid separate votes were cast. Out of 69,673,653 registered voters, 57,350,968 voted, with a turnout of 82.20%, the largest in Philippine midterm election history. Bong Go gained first place with 27,121,073 votes, 6.33% of the total split votes. Six Alyansa para sa Bagong Pilipinas slate members were elected, four members of DuterTen won the election, and both KiBam members were declared senators. Aquino and Pangilinan thanked their voters for their unexpected surge into 2nd and 5th places respectively. Meanwhile, according to The Philippine Star, Marcos's and Sara Duterte's post-election statements conveyed disappointment, with Marcos prioritizing public service and Duterte stating that the outcome was "not what we had hoped for". The 12 winning senators' proclamation was held on the afternoon of May 17 at the Manila Hotel.

== Senators elected in 2025 ==
- Key: **Boldface** and ‡ (double dagger): incumbent

Philippine Senators elected in 2025
Rank	Image	Senator	Party	Coalition	Voted at (Note: Senators are elected on a nationwide, at-large basis. This column shows the place where the candidate voted in.)	Votes	Prior congressional and elective executive positions	Birth year
1st	Portrait of Bong Go wearing a barong, a white background behind him	**Bong Go** ‡	PDP	DuterTen	Lupon, Davao Oriental	27,121,073	Senator (2019–2025)	1974
2nd	Portrait of Bam Aquino wearing a barong, a white background behind him	Bam Aquino	KANP	KiBam	Concepcion, Tarlac	20,971,899	Senator (2013–2019)	1977
3rd	Portrait of Ronald dela Rosa wearing a barong, a white background behind him	**Ronald dela Rosa** ‡	PDP	DuterTen	Santa Cruz, Davao del Sur	20,773,946	Senator (2019–2025)	1962
4th	Portrait of Erwin Tulfo wearing a barong, a white background behind him	Erwin Tulfo	Lakas	Alyansa para sa Bagong Pilipinas	Quezon City	17,118,881	Member of the House of Representatives from ACT-CIS Partylist (2023–2025)	1963
5th	Portrait of Francis Pangilinan wearing a barong, a white background behind him	Kiko Pangilinan	Liberal	KiBam	Silang, Cavite	15,343,229	Senator (2001–2013, 2016–2022)	1963
6th	Portrait of Rodante Marcoleta wearing a barong, a white background behind him	Rodante Marcoleta	Independent	DuterTen	Cainta, Rizal	15,250,723	Member of the House of Representatives from SAGIP Partylist (2016–2025), Member of the House of Representatives from Alagad Party-list (2004–2013)	1953
7th	Portrait of Panfilo Lacson wearing a barong, a white background behind him	Panfilo Lacson	Independent	Alyansa para sa Bagong Pilipinas	Imus, Cavite	15,106,111	Senator (2001–2013, 2016–2022)	1948
8th	Portrait of Tito Sotto wearing a barong, a white background behind him	Tito Sotto	NPC	Alyansa para sa Bagong Pilipinas	Quezon City	14,832,996	Senator (1992–2004, 2010–2022), Vice Mayor of Quezon City (1988–1992)	1948
9th	Portrait of Pia Cayetano wearing a white dress, a white background behind her	**Pia Cayetano** ‡	Nacionalista	Alyansa para sa Bagong Pilipinas	Taguig	14,573,430	Senator (2004–2016, 2019–2025), Member of the Philippine House of Representatives from Taguig–Pateros's 2nd congressional district (2016–2019)	1966
10th	Portrait of Camille Villar wearing a white dress, a white background behind her	Camille Villar	Nacionalista	Alyansa para sa Bagong Pilipinas	Las Piñas	13,651,274	Member of the Philippine House of Representatives from Las Piñas's at-large congressional district (2019–2025)	1985
11th	Portrait of Lito Lapid wearing a barong, a white background behind him	**Lito Lapid** ‡	NPC	Alyansa para sa Bagong Pilipinas	Porac, Pampanga	13,394,102	Senator (2004–2016, 2019–2025), Governor of Pampanga (1995–2004), Vice Governor of Pampanga (1992–1995)	1955
12th	Portrait of Imee Marcos wearing a green and pink dress, a white background behind her	**Imee Marcos** ‡	Nacionalista	N/A (Note: Marcos was originally part of the Alyansa para sa Bagong Pilipinas slate, but left.)	Laoag, Ilocos Norte	13,339,227	Senator (2019–2025), Governor of Ilocos Norte (2010–2019), Member of the Philippine House of Representatives from Ilocos Norte's 2nd congressional district (1998–2007)	1955
