= Kasal, Kasali, Kasalo =

2006 romantic comedy film by Jose Javier Reyes

- Theatrical poster
- Directed by: Jose Javier Reyes
- Written by: Jose Javier Reyes
- Screenplay by: Mary Ann Bautista
- Produced by: Charo Santos-Concio; Malou N. Santos
- Starring: Judy Ann Santos; Ryan Agoncillo
- Cinematography: Monchie Redoble
- Edited by: Vito Cajili
- Music by: Jesse Lucas
- Production company: Star Cinema
- Release date: December 25, 2006
- Running time: 100 minutes
- Country: Philippines
- Language: Filipino
- Box office: ₱187 million

Kasal, Kasali, Kasalo (released on Netflix as Wedded, Worried, Wearied; Wedding, Joining In, Partaker) is a 2006 Filipino romantic comedy film written and directed by Jose Javier Reyes and it was based on a written screenplay by Mary Ann Bautista. It was an official entry for the 2006 Metro Manila Film Festival. It stars the real-life couple, Judy Ann Santos and Ryan Agoncillo as Angie and Jed and also starring Gina Pareño, Gloria Diaz, and Ariel Ureta.

The film emerged as the big winner of the 32nd Metro Manila Film Festival with a total of nine awards. The film had a two-week gross of ₱139.9 million, becoming the highest-grossing film of the festival. At the end of its theatrical run, Kasal, Kasali, Kasalo grossed ₱187 million, making it the 4th highest-grossing Philippine-produced movie of all time at that time (not adjusted for inflation).

== Plot ==
=== Prologue ===
Jed, a company executive, goes on a blind date and meets Angelita (Angie), who works at a television network. They develop feelings for each other. When Jed’s parents ask him to move to the United States, he proposes to Angie out of love, and she agrees to marry him.

=== Kasal ===
Jed and Angie’s wedding becomes known to their parents. Angie’s mother, Belita, a barangay kagawad in Cabanatuan and known for selling bototay, thinks Angie is pregnant, which Angie denies. Belita refuses to tell her estranged husband, Rommel, about the wedding. Jed’s parents, Carlos and Charito, are shocked and return to the Philippines. Belita insists on holding the wedding in Cabanatuan and invites her friends and political allies. Carlos tells Charito not to interfere, and Angie argues with Jed about his mother, calling off the wedding. However, they still love each other, so Jed proposes again, and they decide on a simple ceremony.

=== Kasali ===
After their marriage, Jed and Angie live in Jed's house while his parents, Carlos and Charito, are in the United States. They have a series of misunderstandings, like when Angie's brother, Otap, and nephew take part of Jed's Batman toy collection. Charito also scolds Jed after discovering that Angie rearranged the furniture. Belita stays with them for a conference but clashes with Charito when she uses Charito's expensive towel from London to dye her hair, leading Belita to move to a hotel. To make things right, Jed surprises Angie with a new house so they can start fresh. Angie also surprises Jed by announcing she's pregnant.

=== Kasalo ===
Jed and Angie settle into their new home as they await the birth of their baby boy. Both of their parents are happy when they learn Angie is pregnant. At a party, Jed meets Mariel, a resort owner, and starts an affair without Angie knowing. The affair is exposed when Angie finds a text from Mariel on Jed's cellphone. When Angie learns they’re meeting for lunch, she surprises Jed by arriving with Mariel. She confronts him about his infidelity and moves to Belita’s house in Cabanatuan. Belita asks Rommel (her ex-husband and Angie's father) to talk to their daughter. After a heart-to-heart with her father, Angie decides to meet Jed and ask for an apology. Their conversation turns into an argument, and Angie goes into labor, giving birth to a son on their first wedding anniversary. Afterward, she reconciles with Jed. The couple returns home with their son and is welcomed by Belita and Charito.

== Cast ==
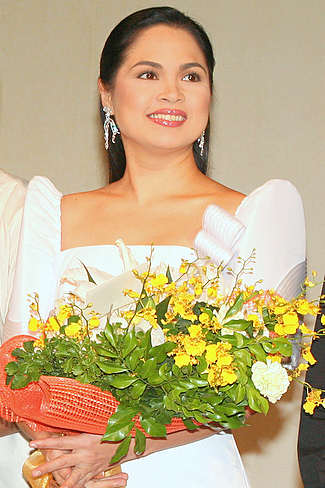
Judy Ann Santos portrays Angelita "Angie" Mariano-Valeriano.

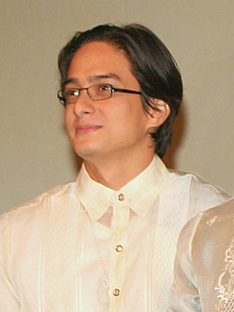
Ryan Agoncillo portrays Jerome "Jed" Valeriano

- Judy Ann Santos as Angelita "Angie" Mariano-Valeriano
- Ryan Agoncillo as Jerome "Jed" Valeriano
- Gina Pareño as Belita Mariano
- Gloria Diaz as Charito Valeriano
- Ariel Ureta as Dr. Carlos Valeriano
- Soliman Cruz as Rommell Mariano
- Derek Ramsay as Ronnie
- Juliana Palermo as Mariel
- Lui Villaruz as Erwin
- Kat Alano as Sandra
- Tuesday Vargas as Catalina
- Cheena Crab as Cora
- AJ Perez Otap
- Nina Medina as Manang Pasyang
- Gerard Pizzaras as Elmo
- Edgar Ebro as the Waiter
- Kakai Bautista as Myra
- Carlo Balmaceda as Bronson

== Development ==
The original screenplay for Kasal, Kasali, Kasalo, written by Mary Ann Bautista, won second place in one of the national screenwriting competitions of the Film Development Foundation (now the Film Development Council) in the 1990s, though it took a decade before it was developed into a feature film.

In the mid-1990s, Ishmael Bernal and Jose Javier Reyes had talks about developing a romantic comedy movie starring Nora Aunor for Regal Films where it was initially entitled as Kasal. However, the project was canceled due to the death of director Ishmael Bernal in 1996. Years later, Reyes was approached by ABS-CBN to do a film starring Judy Ann Santos and Ryan Agoncillo. Reyes would pitch the film to them and then, it was approved and began writing the script for it. ABS-CBN would later tell Reyes that they had decided to change the title to Kasal, Kasali Kasalo because they did not like the script and the title initially developed by Reyes. Joey Reyes would redevelop the film to include the other two parts which is "Kasali" and "Kasalo".

== Reception ==
=== Accolades ===
Year	Award-giving body	Category	Recipient	Result
2006	Metro Manila Film Festival	Best Second Best Film	Kasal, Kasali, Kasalo	Won
2006	Metro Manila Film Festival	Gatpuno Antonio J. Villegas Cultural Award	Kasal, Kasali, Kasalo	Won
2006	Metro Manila Film Festival	Most Gender-Sensitive Film	Kasal, Kasali, Kasalo	Won
2006	Metro Manila Film Festival	Best Director	Jose Javier Reyes	Won
2006	Metro Manila Film Festival	Best Actress	Judy Ann Santos	Won
2006	Metro Manila Film Festival	Best Supporting Actress	Gina Pareno	Won
2006	Metro Manila Film Festival	Best Original Story	Jose Javier Reyes	Won
2006	Metro Manila Film Festival	Best Screenplay	Jose Javier Reyes	Won
2006	Metro Manila Film Festival	Best Original Theme Song	Yeng Constantino - "Hawak Kamay"	Won
2006	Metro Manila Film Festival	2nd Runner-up - Best Float	Kasal Kasali Kasalo	Won
2007	5th Gawad Tanglaw	One of Five Outstanding Films of the Year	Kasal, Kasali, Kasalo	Won
2007	5th Gawad Tanglaw	One of Five Outstanding Directors of the Year	Jose Javier Reyes	Won
2007	23rd PMPC Star Awards for Movies	Movie of the Year	Kasal, Kasali, Kasalo	Won
2007	23rd PMPC Star Awards for Movies	Movie Director of the Year	Jose Javier Reyes	Won
2007	23rd PMPC Star Awards for Movies	Movie Actress of the Year	Judy Ann Santos	Won
2007	23rd PMPC Star Awards for Movies	Movie Supporting Actress of the Year	Gina Pareño	Won
2007	23rd PMPC Star Awards for Movies	Movie Original Screenplay of the Year	Jose Javier Reyes	Won
2007	4th ENPRESS Golden Screen Awards	Best Motion Picture - Musical or Comedy	Kasal, Kasali, Kasalo	Won
2007	4th ENPRESS Golden Screen Awards	Best Performance by an Actress in a Leading Role - Musical or Comedy	Judy Ann Santos	Won
2007	9th Gawad Sineng-Sine PASADO Awards	Best Screenplay	Jose Javier Reyes	Won
2007	55th FAMAS Awards	Best Picture	Kasal, Kasali, Kasalo	Won
2007	55th FAMAS Awards	Best Director	Jose Javier Reyes	Won
2007	55th FAMAS Awards	Best Actress	Judy Ann Santos	Won
2007	55th FAMAS Awards	Best Supporting Actress	Gina Pareño	Won
2007	55th FAMAS Awards	Best Story	Jose Javier Reyes	Won
2007	55th FAMAS Awards	Best Screenplay	Jose Javier Reyes	Won
2007	55th FAMAS Awards	Best Editing	Vito Cajili	Won
2007	55th FAMAS Awards	Best Musical Score	Jessie Lucas	Won
2007	55th FAMAS Awards	Best Theme Song	Yeng Constantino - "Hawak Kamay"	Won
2007	25th FAP Luna Awards	Best Picture	Kasal, Kasali, Kasalo	Won
2007	25th FAP Luna Awards	Best Director	Jose Javier Reyes	Won
2007	25th FAP Luna Awards	Best Actress	Judy Ann Santos	Won
2007	25th FAP Luna Awards	Best Supporting Actress	Gina Pareño	Won
2007	25th FAP Luna Awards	Best Screenplay	Jose Javier Reyes and Mary Ann Bautista	Won
2007	25th FAP Luna Awards	Best Editing	Vito Cajili	Won
2007	1st Gawad Genio Awards (The Annual Critics' Academy Film Desk; Zamboanga City)	Best Film	Kasal, Kasali, Kasalo	Won
2007	1st Gawad Genio Awards (The Annual Critics' Academy Film Desk; Zamboanga City)	Best Film Director	Jose Javier Reyes	Won
2007	1st Gawad Genio Awards (The Annual Critics' Academy Film Desk; Zamboanga City)	Best Film Actress	Judy Ann Santos	Won
2007	1st Gawad Genio Awards (The Annual Critics' Academy Film Desk; Zamboanga City)	Best Film Supporting Actress	Gina Pareño	Won
2007	1st Gawad Genio Awards (The Annual Critics' Academy Film Desk; Zamboanga City)	Best Film editor	Vito Cajili	Won
2007	1st Gawad Genio Awards (The Annual Critics' Academy Film Desk; Zamboanga City)	Best Film Screenwriter	Jose Javier Reyes	Won
2007	1st Gawad Genio Awards (The Annual Critics' Academy Film Desk; Zamboanga City)	Best Film Soundtrack	Yeng Constantino - "Hawak Kamay"	Won
2007	1st Gawad Genio Awards (The Annual Critics' Academy Film Desk; Zamboanga City)	Best Film Story	Jose Javier Reyes	Won
2007	1st Gawad Genio Awards (The Annual Critics' Academy Film Desk; Zamboanga City)	Outstanding Genio awardee	Star Cinema - ABS-CBN Film Productions, Inc.	Won
2007	2007 YES! Magazine's Readers' Choice	Favorite Movie of the Year	Kasal, Kasali, Kasalo	Won

== Sequels ==
Kasal, Kasali, Kasalo was followed by Sakal, Sakali, Saklolo, released in the following year and revolves Angie and Jed as parents to their son. Like its predecessor, the film was released as one of the entries for Metro Manila Film Festival but it received criticism for the use of ethnic slurs that demean the non-Tagalog-speaking audiences.

In the pre-show for the digital premiere of the film's restored version on KTX.ph on July 15, 2021, when Leo Katigbak (head of ABS-CBN Film Archives and its film restoration project) asked the film's lead stars, Judy Ann Santos and Ryan Agoncillo, and writer-director Jose Javier Reyes if they are interested in having another sequel of the film, their answers are that they are open on doing the third and final part of the film. The writer-director also said that the sequel will happen soon.
