= Mikhail Kharit =

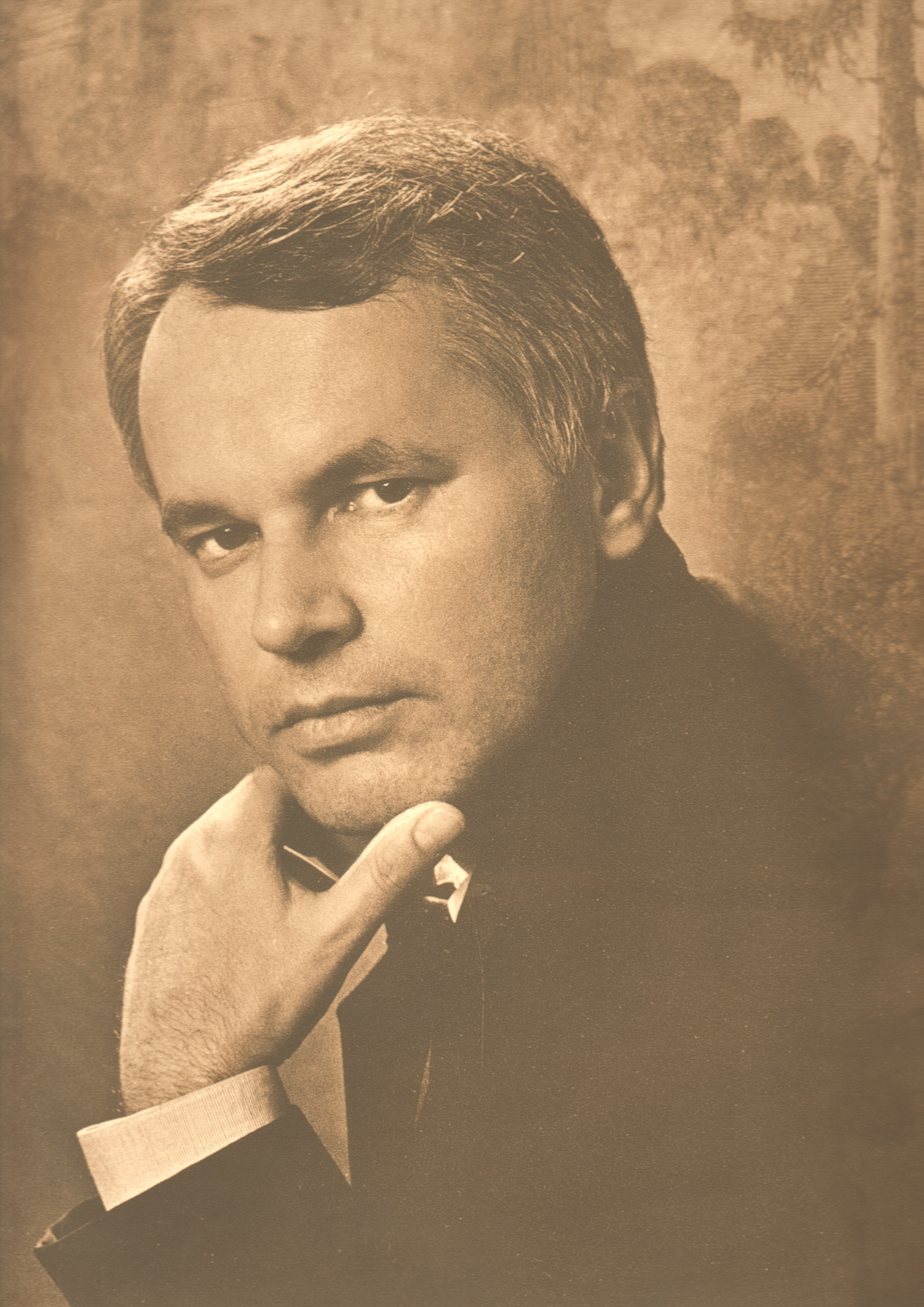
- Born: 2 July 1955; Moscow, Russia
- Education: Moscow Institute of Transport Engineers
- Known for: scientist, architect, writer
- Awards: Lenin Komsomol Prize, Medal "In Commemoration of the 850th Anniversary of Moscow"

Mikhail Kharit (Russian: Михаил Давидович Харит; 2 July 1955, Moscow) – a Soviet and Russian scientist, architect, PhD in Engineering Science, professor, writer, Lenin Komsomol Prize laureate in science and technology.

== Biography and scientific work ==
Mikhail Kharit was born in Moscow on 2 July 1955, in a family of scientists. After graduation from the Moscow Institute of Transport Engineers (MIIT)in 1977 he continued his scientific activities at the same institution.

He defended his PhD Thesis in 1981. The main conclusion of the PhD Thesis appeared as a separate item in the Soviet Union Construction Norms and Regulations.

Then he worked at the Central Research Institute of Transport Construction as a head of the "Central laboratory for the protection of metal and concrete structures from hazardous external influences".

In 1989 he became the Lenin Komsomol Prize laureate in science and technology on the basis of "creation of highly efficient methods of fastening the underground workings, constructed in difficult engineering and geological conditions with use of new composite materials".

In 1987 he became the head of a major architectural and construction company in Russia "Интекс" ("Intex"). Being an architect, during the period from 1998 to 2001 he participated in the restoration of historic buildings in Russia, England, Italy.

One of his famous inventions is a new artificial stone (architectural concrete) with adjustable appearance, colors and characteristics such as: frost resistance, water resistance and strength. Well-known technology called "ИНТЕКС. Белый камень" ("INTEX. White stone") is also one of his inventions. Note that all of his inventions, such as: new materials and technology held for use in building and renovating of houses in historical styles were approved and recommended for implementation at the facilities of Moscow during the meeting of the Moscow City Duma. Afterwards, these scientific researches were followed by his son Oleg Mikhailovich Kharit Russian: Олег Михаилович Харит.

In 1997, M. Kharit was awarded the Medal "In Commemoration of the 850th Anniversary of Moscow" for significant contribution in the development of Moscow.

In 2001, the first volume of Encyclopedia of Architecture titled "The New age of Russian country estate" was published under his name.

In 2003, "The New York Times" called Mikhail Kharit one of the most successful structural architects in Russia.

At the beginning of 2000, M. Kharit started to research the influence of houses' architectural style on human health. This research allowed him to develop a new algorithm and to create a program that uses the equations of the regression analysis and the Fourier series for the analysis of the collected statistical data. He developed a new algorithm and created a program that uses the equations of the for the analysis of the collected statistical data.

In 2005, M. Kharit published the second volume of Encyclopedia of Architecture "A beautiful house. Architectural ideas from different countries". The same year he defended his doctoral thesis for the degree of PhD in Technical Sciences and got an academic rank of Professor. He was elected as President of the United Foundation for socio-economic research, development of architecture, science, culture and art ("Unity") as well as became a member of the Union of Journalists. During the years of his management a periodic journal "Modern" was published. Note that this journal published the latest researches in the field of architecture, videoecology, psychophysics, philosophy, neuropsychology and religion.

He was also a participant of scientific expeditions in Antarctica, the Loch Ness lake, the estate of Antoine Thomson d'Abbadi, the Pyrenees, the Cathar and Basque country, the Egyptian pyramids, the Dead Sea and took part in archaeological excavations in Israel, Italy, Greece, France. He published a series of articles on philosophy, history of religions, Kabbalah, theology.

In 2006, M. Kharit published the monograph titled "The Mysteries of the Holy Scriptures. Commentaries to the Bible and the Torah".

In 2008, the third volume of the Encyclopedia of Architecture "Famous houses, castles and estates" was published under his name.

In 2015, he published his first novel known under the name "Piscatores et Vinitores". In 2021 the sequel to the novel "Fishermen and Winegrowers" was published: "Fishermen and Winegrowers. At the beginning of change " .

In 2022, two of the largest Russian publishing houses publishing his new book "Ar-Megiddo Carnival".

He is a Master of Sports in Boxing as well as constantly practices kyokushinkai karate and hand-to-hand combat.

== Bibliography ==
Mikhail Kharit wrote more than 200 scientific and popular articles, 3-volume encyclopedia of architecture, monograph on the Kabbalah, Christianity and Judaism, as well as philosophical novel titled "Fishermen and winegrowers".

- M. Kharit "Durable concrete", 1981 Transport. Moscow
- M. Kharit "The calculation of damages to concrete surfaces of bridge piers" Works of the MIIT. 1981. Vol. 641
- M. Kharit "Assessment of the reliability of bridge structures under unfavorable environmental influences". col. "Improving the machine structure and efficiency enhancement of the design and construction of transportation constructions" VNIITS. 1981
- M. Kharit "Durability of reinforced concrete structures and concrete, taking into account the adverse effects of the external environment, 1982. Transport. Moscow
- M. Kharit "Recommendations for improving the durability of reinforced concrete supports of transportation construction." M. The Ministry Of Construction. 1982
- M. Kharit "The bridge piers under the impact of water flow". "Transport construction" mag. 4 1983
- M. Kharit "Concrete with accelerated curing regime" "Transport construction" mag. 6 1984
- M. Kharit "Architectural trends in modern house-construction techniques " A collection of articles. "Domovoy" mag. The app "Architecture and Construction". May. 2000
- M. Kharit "The architecture of Italy" Part 1. "New home" mag. Jan. 2001
- M. Kharit "The architecture of southern England" Part 1. "New home" mag. June issue 2001
- M. Kharit "In harmony with nature and itself" "New home" mag ". Special issue 2000–2001
- M. Kharit "The architecture of southern England" Part 1. "New home" mag. June issue 2001
- M. Kharit "The architecture of southern England" Part 2. "New home" mag. July issue 2001
- M. Kharit "The architecture of southern England" Part 3. "New home" mag. Aug issue 2001
- M. Kharit "The architecture of southern England" Part 4. "New home" mag. Oct issue 2001
- M. Kharit "The return of the "Art Nouveau" architectural style". "Domovoy" mag. 10, 2001
- M. Kharit "The architecture of Italy" Part 2. "New home" mag. Mar. 2001
- M. Kharit "The architecture of Italy" Part 3. "New home" mag. Apr. 2001
- M. Kharit "The new age of Russian country estates". The Popular encyclopedia of architecture. 2001. Ed. Astrel. Moscow
- M. Kharit "The new age of Russian country estates". The 2nd edition (revised and enlarged). 2001. Ed. Astrel. AST. Moscow
- M. Kharit "The popular encyclopedia of architecture. The new age of Russian country estates." Moscow: Astrel. 2001
- M. Kharit "The architecture of Greece". "New home" mag. Dec. 2001
- M. Kharit "The Architecture of Central Europe" Part 1. "New home" mag. Vol.2, 2002
- M. Kharit "The Architecture of Central Europe" Part 2. "New home" mag. Vol.3, 2002
- M. Kharit "Foundations," "New home" mag. 8, 2002
- M. Kharit " The architecture for a home with a good reputation" "New home" mag. 1, 2003
- M. Kharit "Feng Shui. An architect's view". "New home" mag. 2, 2003
- M. Kharit "Mystical doctrines" "Modern" mag.4, 2003
- M. Kharit "The dissertation on competition of a scientific degree of doctor of technical Sciences "Organization and architecture of low-rise country construction"". MIIT (Moscow), 2003
- M. Kharit "Architecture & Psychophysics". Modern 2. 2003
- M. Kharit "Bible.ru. Farewell Bell. A series of articles". Modern. 2003
- M. Kharit "Mystical teachings". Modern 4. 2003
- M. Kharit "An architectural journey. Alsace" "New home" mag, vol.4, 2004
- M. Kharit "What the archaeology will tell. A series of articles". Modern. 2004
- M. Kharit "Secrets of the brain". A series of articles in the "Modern" magazine, Apr.-July 2005
- M. Kharit "Mysteries of the brain. A series of articles". Modern 4–5. 2005
- M. Kharit "A beautiful house. Architectural ideas from different countries", 2005, UAB "Spaudos Konturai", Vilnius, Lithuania
- M. Kharit The popular encyclopedia of architecture. A beautiful house. Architectural ideas from different countries. Moscow: Astrel. 2005
- M. Kharit "The Mysteries of the Holy Scriptures. Commentaries to the Bible and the Torah," 2006 UAB "Spaudos Konturai", Vilnius, Lithuania
- M. Kharit "Mysteries of Antarctica". Modern 6. 2006
- M. Kharit Commentaries to the Bible and the Torah. The Mysteries of the Holy Scriptures. Vilnius: Spaudos Konturai. 2006
- M. Kharit "Famous houses, castles, estates". 2008. UAB "Spaudos Konturai", Vilnius, Lithuania
- M. Kharit The popular encyclopedia of architecture. Famous houses, castles and estates. Vilnius: Spaudos Konturai. 2008
- M. Kharit Piscatores et Vinitores. Moscow: Ripol classic. 2016
- M. Kharit "Fishermen and winegrowers" novel. 2016. Ed. Ripol-classic. Moscow.
