= Little Champ =

- Title card
- Genre: Action, Fantasy, Family
- Created by: ABS-CBN Studios; Roldeo T. Endrinal; Julie Anne R. Benitez; Gina Marissa Tagasa-Gil
- Written by: Genesis Rodriguez; Agnes de Guzman; Randy Q. Villanueva; Raymund Barcelon; John Paul B. Melosantos; Janice O'Hara; Bridgette Ann M. Rebucca
- Directed by: Dondon S. Santos; Richard I. Arellano; Mervyn B. Brondial
- Starring: JB Agustin; Lito Lapid; Jhong Hilario
- Opening theme: "Kung Kailangan Mo Ako" by Piolo Pascual with the ABS-CBN Philharmonic Orchestra
- Composer: Rey Valera
- Country of origin: Philippines
- Original language: Filipino
- No. of episodes: 47

Production
- Executive producer: Celeste Villanueva Lumasac
- Cinematography: David Siat; Justiano Dela Cruz
- Running time: 45 minutes Monday to Friday at 17:45 (PST)

Original release
- Network: ABS-CBN
- Release: March 18 – May 24, 2013

Little Champ is a 2013 Philippine television drama series broadcast by ABS-CBN. Directed by Dondon S. Santos, Richard I. Arellano and Mervyn B. Brondial, it stars Lito Lapid, Jhong Hilario, and JB Agustin. It aired on the network's Primetime Bida line up and worldwide on TFC from March 18 to May 24, 2013, and was replaced by Annaliza.

The series is streaming online on YouTube.

== Synopsis ==
The story revolves around the simple lives of Caloy, his parents Lucas and Helen, and their sickly horse, Chalk.

Their quiet family life will change however when Caloy's playmate, the son of the rich haciendero Miguel, falls off a horse and dies. Miguel, who will put the blame on Caloy, will hunt the child down. Caloy will flee with his loyal horse Chalk and will find refuge under Leon del Torro, a barangay captain.

The forces of good and evil will clash when a meteorite falls, breaks into two, and lands separately on Chalk and Miguel. Powered by the meteorite, Chalk will change from a sickly horse to a powerful stallion that can talk while Miguel will experience evil powers, fueled by his lust for revenge.

== Cast and characters ==
=== Main cast ===
- JB Agustin as Carlos "Caloy" Caballero
- Lito Lapid as Leon "Amang" del Torro
- Jhong Hilario as Lucas Caballero/Leon del Torro, Jr.
- Precious Lara Quigaman as Helen Caballero
- Jake Roxas as Miguel Suarez
- Mickey Ferriols as Xiu Xiang
- Katya Santos as Maricel
- Paolo Serrano as Badong
- Coleen Garcia as Alice
- Renz Fernandez as Jason
- Sofia Millares as Lulubelle

=== Supporting cast ===
- Ruben Gonzaga as Gorio
- Alex Calleja as Sarge

=== Guest cast ===
- Pen Medina as Elmer
- Alchris Galura as Tatay Bong
- Kim Atienza as himself
- Rez Cortez as Mr. de Leon
- Dionne Monsanto as Ofelia
- Ana Capri as Linda
- Tony Mabesa as Wycong
- Manuel Chua as Brix
- Gina Pareño as Shuning
- Wowie de Guzman as Bondoc
- Rafael Rosell as Salazar / Ulupong
- Yayo Aguila as Dahlia
- Izzy Canillo as Charlie
- Cacai Bautista as Josie
- Joko Diaz as Jose
- Baldo Marro as Teroy
- Michael Roy Jornales as Oliver
- Jethro Ramirez as Tony
- Anica Tindoy as Sheryl
- Abegail Acan as Gracia
- Dimples Romana as Kara
- Jayson Gainza as Melchor
- Efren Reyes Jr. as Hector
- Justin Gonzales as Doy
- Franco Daza as Batch
- Helga Krapf as Faye

=== Special participation ===
- Jolo Revilla as Gio Suarez
- Mark Lapid as young Leon

=== Voice cast ===
- Maliksi Morales as Chalk
- Jane Oineza as Brown Sugar
- Eddie Garcia as Champion
- John Regala as Black Jack
- Rico J. Puno as Kurimaw
- Joonee Gamboa as Rango
- Jeffrey Tam as Astig

== Soundtrack ==
OST Part 1

- Kung Kailangan Mo Ako - Piolo Pascual with the ABS-CBN Philharmonic Orchestra
- Kung Kailangan Mo Ako (Inst.) - ABS-CBN Philharmonic Orchestra
- Unravel - Seal Team

== See also ==
- List of programs broadcast by ABS-CBN
- List of ABS-CBN Studios original drama series
