= Tatlong Baraha =

2006 Filipino action-fantasy film

- Directed by: Toto Natividad
- Screenplay by: Tony Y. Reyes; Ely Matawaran; Joe Carreon
- Story by: Lito Lapid
- Based on: Tatlong Baraha (1981) by Manuel "Lito" Lapid
- Produced by: Violeta C. Sevilla
- Starring: Lito Lapid; Mark Lapid; Maynard Lapid
- Cinematography: Diboy Trofeo
- Edited by: Toto Natividad
- Music by: Kiko Ortega; Dong Ong Leo; Fred Ferraz
- Production company: MTL Films
- Distributed by: Violett Films Production
- Release date: December 25, 2006
- Country: Philippines
- Language: Filipino
- Box office: ₱3.96 million

Tatlong Baraha is a 2006 Filipino action-fantasy film edited and directed by Toto Natividad and starring Lito Lapid and his sons Mark and Maynard. The film is a remake of the 1981 film of the same name, also starring Lito Lapid and featuring his brothers Rey and Efren. The film brings together Leon Guerrero, Julio Valiente and Geronimo, all characters that Lito Lapid previously played in separate movie franchises, to form a vigilante super team.

An official entry to the 2006 Metro Manila Film Festival, Tatlong Baraha was the least-grossing film among the nine festival entries and a box-office bomb, earning only ₱3.96 million throughout the festival's two-week run.

== Plot ==
The father and sons triumvirate play three oppressed Filipinos during the Spanish regime, a cowardly farmer (Lito Lapid), a mentally challenged man (Mark Lapid), and a hunchback bell ringer (Maynard Lapid). Because of their sufferings, they were blessed with powers to help their fellowmen. They became warriors which symbolizes hope, heroes and defenders of the oppressed and poor, they are Zigomar (Maynard Lapid), Julio Valiente (Mark Lapid) and Leon Guerrero (Lito Lapid) ready to fight for justice and freedom against evil.

== Cast ==
- Lito Lapid as Leo/Leonard/Leon Guerrero
- Mark Lapid as Julian/Doc Julius/Julio Valiente
- Maynard Lapid as Mar/Marcial/Zigomar
- Monsour del Rosario as Faustino
- Phoemela Baranda as Corazon/Cory
- Girlie Sevilla as Paula/Paulyn
- Jackie Rice as Juana/Jacky
- Bearwin Meily as Tomas/Lolo/Tom
- Charlie Davao as Hepe General
- Jess Lapid Jr.
- King Gutierrez
- Dinky Doo as a scout master
- Danny Labra as a scout master
- Ernie Forte
- Nort Nepomuceno
- Telly Babasa
- Vice Mayor Bong Tolentino as an orphanage officer
- Paul "Concon" Laus
- Aja Ramiscal
- Jossie Tagle
- Edgar Dino
- Robert Miller as a bank robber
- Pam Quinn
- Katrina "Hopia" Legaspi as a jamboree kid
- Nikki Bagaporo as a jamboree kid
- Kathryn Bernardo as Inah Valiente
- John Vladimir Manalo as an orphan kid
- Miles Ocampo as an orphan kid
- "Iggy Boy" Flores as an orphan kid
- Basty Alcanzes as a school bus kid
- Cyrus Morning Co as a school bus kid
- Boy Roque

== Accolades ==
Year	Award-Giving Body	Category	Recipient	Result
2006	Metro Manila Film Festival	Best Visual Effects	Imaginary Friends	Won
2006	Metro Manila Film Festival	Best Make-up Artist	Baby Lucero	Won
2006	Metro Manila Film Festival	Best Float	Tatlong Baraha	Won
