= Mano Po 5: Gua Ai Di =

2006 Filipino romantic comedy-drama film

- Official movie poster
- Directed by: Joel C. Lamangan
- Screenplay by: Andrew Paredes; Dode Cruz
- Story by: Lily Y. Monteverde; Andrew Paredes; Dode Cruz; Abi Lam-Parayno
- Produced by: Lily Y. Monteverde
- Starring: Richard Gutierrez; Angel Locsin
- Cinematography: Charlie Peralta
- Edited by: Marya Ignacio
- Music by: Von de Guzman
- Production companies: Regal Films; Regal Multimedia
- Distributed by: Regal Films
- Release date: December 25, 2006 (Philippines)
- Running time: 122 minutes
- Country: Philippines
- Language: Filipino
- Box office: ₱22 million

Mano Po 5: Gua Ai Di (also billed parenthetically as Mano Po 5: Gua Ai Di (I Love You)) (simplified Chinese: 我爱你; traditional Chinese: 我愛你; pinyin: Wǒ ài nǐ; Pe̍h-ōe-jī: Góa ài dí; lit. 'I love you') is a 2006 Filipino romantic comedy-drama film produced by Regal Entertainment and the fifth installment of the Mano Po film series) It stars Angel Locsin and Richard Gutierrez as Charity and Nathan respectively. Nathan, a veterinarian with playboy tendencies falls in love with Charity, a Chinese Filipino who always follows tradition. In order to woo not only Charity but also her family, Nathan tries to follow and adapt Chinese culture, but with hilarious results.

Unlike the earlier films in the series, Mano Po 5 also has comedic elements from the previous film.

The film stars Lorna Tolentino, Angel Locsin and Richard Gutierrez, which already starred together in Mano Po 2: My Home. Asia's Superstar and Star In A Million finalist Christian Bautista also appeared in his first film at the height of his successful musical career.

== Plot ==
During a dog's funeral, Charity Kho, a chef, meets Nathan, an average Mestizo Filipino who works as a veterinarian. The two develop a romantic relationship, which is frustrated by Charity's rich Chinese-Filipino family, particularly by her mother Yolly, a traditionalist who believes that their marriage is unlucky because they met at a funeral. She supports instead an arranged marriage with Charity's childhood friend Timothy, who is now a famous international singer with the stage name Felix Yan. The only supporter of the relationship in the Khos is Charity's grandmother, Ama.

Throughout the film, Charity is torn between Nathan and Timothy, with whom she retains warm relations with. Nathan becomes daunted after Charity discloses to him the eccentric behavior of the Khos, particularly her brothers Emerson, a hypochondriac, and Anderson, who has been trying for years to conceive a child with his wife through various methods. He is also worried after learning from an astrologer that he was a philanderer in his previous life who was poisoned by his wives for his unfaithfulness.

During a drunk night out, Nathan divulges the Kho family secrets to his long-time friend Kate, who also has feelings for him. Later, a drunk and jealous Kate crashes into Nathan's first meeting with the Khos and reveals what Nathan told her about them, leading to him being rejected by Khos and Charity breaking up with him. Nathan later chastises Kate, who then makes amends by convincing Charity that Nathan really loves her. As Charity regains her feelings towards Nathan, she amicably calls off her engagement with Timothy. Yolly tries to talk her out back into the agreement, but is chastised by her husband Willy, who criticizes her for the way her domineering ways had adversely affected her children's lives. Yolly realizes her errors and allows her children to live out their own lives.

The Khos, sans Charity, secretly arrange for her and Nathan to meet again at a beach resort. As they fully reconcile, the Khos give their full approval of their relationship.

== Cast ==
- Richard Gutierrez as Dr. Jonathan "Nathan" Ramirez, DVM
- Angel Locsin as Charity Kho
- Christian Bautista as Timothy Lam/Felix Yan
- Lorna Tolentino as Yolanda "Yolly" Kho
- Tirso Cruz III as Williamson "Willy" Kho
- Michelle Madrigal as Kate
- Ketchup Eusebio as Emerson Kho
- AJ Dee as Anderson Kho
- Boots Anson-Roa as Ama
- Tony Mabesa as Ang Kong
- Jaclyn Jose as Donita
- Gina Alajar as Mollie
- Ambet Nabus as the Reporter

== Production ==
The role of Yolanda Kho was originally supposed to be played by Dina Bonnevie. However, upon her return from the United States to shoot scenes for the then-upcoming teleserye Walang Kapalit, Bonnevie suffered bleeding induced by an ovarian cyst. Thus, she was replaced by Lorna Tolentino.

This marks the second time that Bonnevie was removed from the Mano Po, the first being Mano Po 2: My Home. In both instances, Bonnevie withdrew from the film and the characters she was set to portray both went to Lorna Tolentino.

== Awards ==
Year	Award-Giving Body	Category	Recipient	Result
2006	Metro Manila Film Festival	Best Cinematography	Charlie Peralta	Won
2006	Metro Manila Film Festival	Best Production Design	Egay Littua	Won
2006	Metro Manila Film Festival	Best Musical Score	Von De Guzman	Won
2006	Metro Manila Film Festival	Best Sound Recording	Ditoy Aguila	Won
2006	Metro Manila Film Festival	1st Runner-up Best Float	Mano Po 5: Gua Ai Di	Won

== See also ==
- Mano Po (Filipino film series)
- Mano Po
- Mano Po 2
- Mano Po III: My Love
- Ako Legal Wife
- Bahay Kubo: A Pinoy Mano Po!
- Mano Po 6: A Mother's Love
- Mano Po 7: Tsinoy
