= Immaculate Conception Academy of Manila =

Roman Catholic school in Manila, Philippines

- Paaralang Immaculada Concepcion sa Maynila (Filipino)
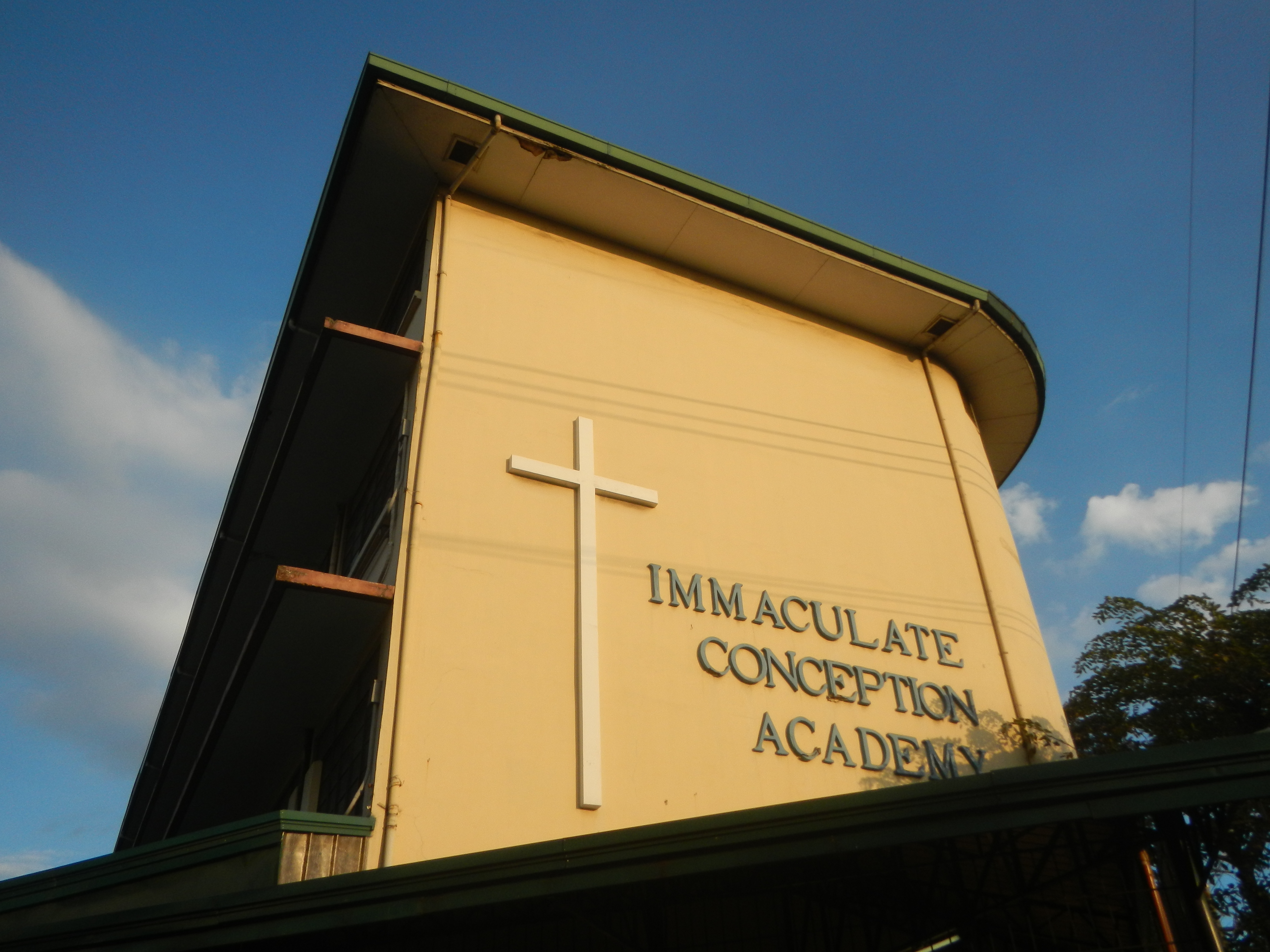

Location
- 2212 S. del Rosario Street, Gagalangin, Balut, Tondo, Manila, Philippines; 14°37′30″N 120°58′04″E

Information
- Type: Private, Catholic
- Motto: "A thankful person witnessing God's kingdom in joyful service"
- Established: 1946
- Grades: K to 12
- Enrollment: preschool (kindergarten), elementary (1st to 6th grade), High School (7th to 12 grade)
- Colors: White and Blue
- Affiliations: MIC Missionary Sisters of the Immaculate Conception
- Website: www.icamanila.edu.ph

Immaculate Conception Academy of Manila (also known as ICAM or ICA Manila) is a private Catholic school facilitated by the Missionary Sisters of the Immaculate Conception (MIC). It is located at 2212 S. del Rosario Street, Gagalangin, Balut, Tondo, Manila.
