= Jodi Lapidus =

American statistician

Academic background
- Education: State University of New York; Columbia University
- Alma mater: University of New Mexico
- Thesis: Multivariate Statistical Methods Using Continuous and Discrete Data (1998)

Academic work
- Discipline: Biostatistics
- Institutions: Oregon Health & Science University

Jodi Ann Lapidus is a professor of biostatistics and director of biostatics education at Oregon Health & Science University (OHSU).

== Education ==
Lapidus comes from a family of teachers. She did her undergraduate studies at the State University of New York, graduating in 1986, and then earned a master's degree from Columbia University in 1988. She completed her Ph.D. at the University of New Mexico in 1998 with a dissertation on Multivariate Statistical Methods Using Continuous and Discrete Data.

== Contributions ==
At OHSU, she has been active in educating Native Americans about statistics, and her research has also included statistical work on injury prevention and child care in Native American communities.

In 2010, Lapidus took part in a Food and Drug Administration advisory committee on genetic engineering of salmon. Lapidus characterized the safety studies that had been done on the fish as "preliminary" and advocated re-prioritizing such studies to focus on proving equivalence to natural fish rather than on finding differences from them.

Other aspects of her research involve proteomics and biomarkers.

== Recognition ==
In 2015, Lapidus was elected as a Fellow of the American Statistical Association.
