= Moscow State University of Civil Engineering =

State university in Moscow, Russia

Moscow State University of Civil Engineering (MGSU)
- Mосковский Государственный Cтроительный Университет
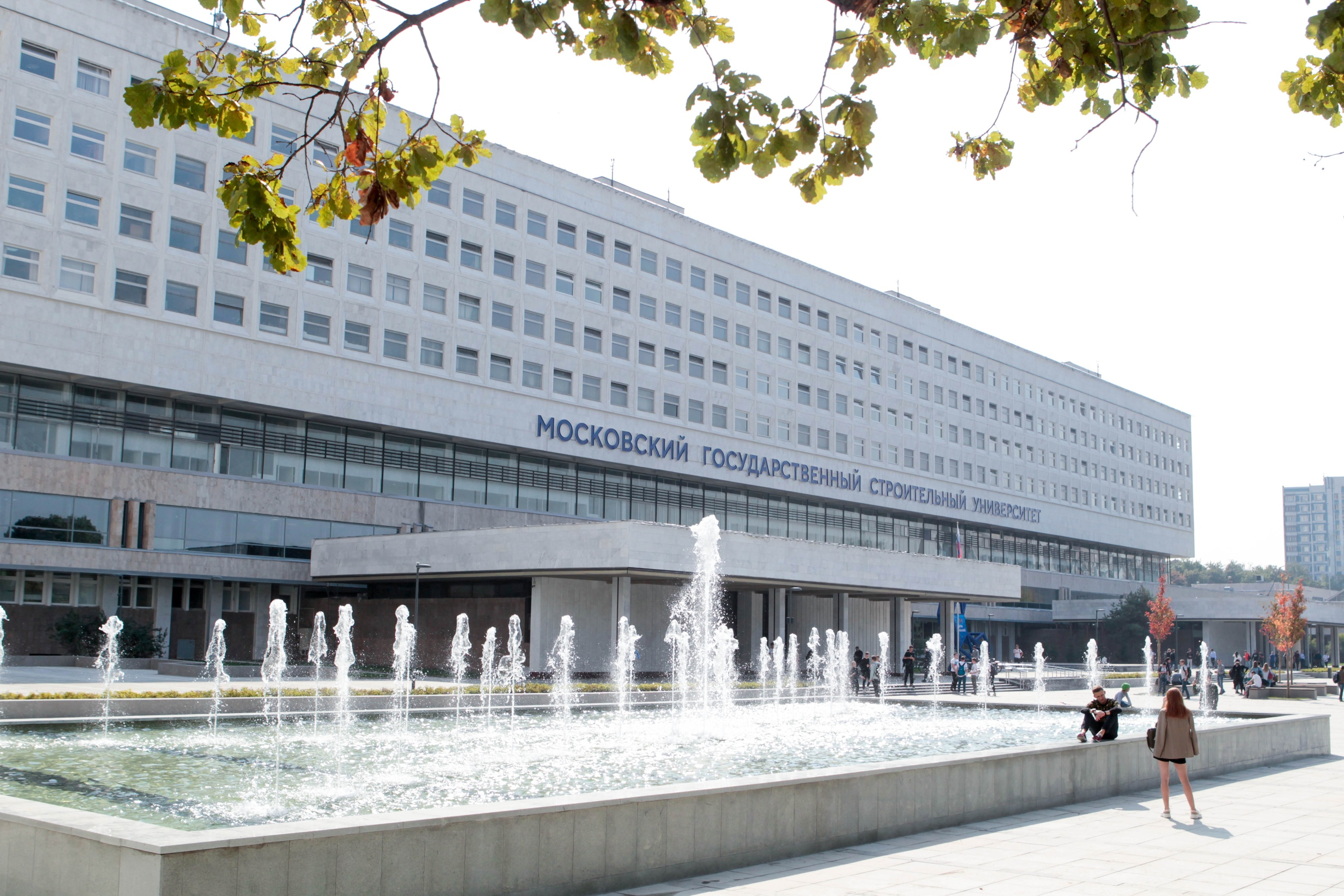
- Former names: Moscow Institute of Civil Engineering named after V.V. Kuybyshev (MISI)
- Type: Public
- Established: 1921
- President: Valeriy I. Telichenko
- Rector: Pavel A. Akimov
- Academic staff: 620
- Students: 9754
- Undergraduates: 7413
- Postgraduates: 2341
- Location: Moscow, Central Federal District, Russian Federation; 55.8575°N 37.6919°E
- Status: National Research University
- Website: https://mgsu.ru/en/

University rankings

Regional – Overall
- QS Emerging Europe and Central Asia: 201-210 (2022)

Moscow State University of Civil Engineering or MGSU (Russian: Московский Государственный Строительный Университет – МГСУ) is a higher education institution located in Moscow, Russia. It is located on Yaroslavl Highway in Yaroslavsky district.

The university holds the status of National Research University. The National Research Moscow State University of Civil Engineering (NRU MGSU) is the leading university of the Russian Federation in the field of construction. MGSU trains engineers, specialists and managers of all levels in the field of industrial, civil, energy, construction management, special and unique construction, information systems and technologies, designing and automation of buildings, constructions and complexes. MGSU has modern research laboratory complexes, providing studies in science and technology. The university has experience of international cooperation with scientific and educational centers from 30 countries.

== History ==
The National Research Moscow State University of Civil Engineering was established in 1921 under the name Moscow Institute of Civil Engineering (MICE). MICE was established as a middle civil engineering college in 1907. MGSU in one of the oldest technical institutions of higher education of the Russian Federation.

The university established six departments after its foundation: Industrial and Civil Engineering, Water Supply and Water Disposal, Hydro-technical and Special Engineering, Heat and Gas Supply and Ventilation, and Mechanization and Automation of Civil Engineering.

By 1933, more than 5000 students studied at the Institute, supported by 600 faculty. The first Russian textbooks in civil engineering were written there and large research laboratories with postgraduate courses were organized at that time. In 1935, MICE was named after V.V. Kuybyshev, and it held this title until 1993 when it was reorganized into Moscow State University of Civil Engineering.

In the years following World War II new departments and faculties were established, more students decided to study there, and the faculty increased in number. MISI scientists were implementing fundamental academic research. The Institute made contacts and formed a scientific partnership with Russian and foreign institutes.

In the 1960s and 1970s, new departments were established: "Heat and Energy Engineering," "Automated Systems of Construction Control," and others. New laboratories and educational campuses were built in the Moscow region, together with new student dormitories.

Starting in 1956, MISI students annually spent the summer semester at construction sites.

Although the university experienced a budget shortage in the 1980s and 1990s, the institute continued to successfully develop.

In 1988, the Education and Methodical Association for Civil Engineering Specialties was established on the basis of MISI. It comprised 28 technical institutes of higher education and some 1000 industrial, polytechnic, technological civil engineering departments. The International Association of Institutions of Higher Education in Civil Engineering was established in 1991. It is headed by the Rector of National Research University MGSU, Andrey Anatolyevich Volkov.

In 1993, the Institute changed its status. It was renamed the Moscow State University of Civil Engineering (MGSU). In 2010, the university was given the status of National Research University, implementing educational and academic activity on the basis of the principles of integration of science and education.

As of April 2022, the university is the only Russian member of the European University Association, with the rest being suspended due to their support for the 2022 Russian invasion of Ukraine.
