= Azary Lapidus =

Azary Abramovich Lapidus
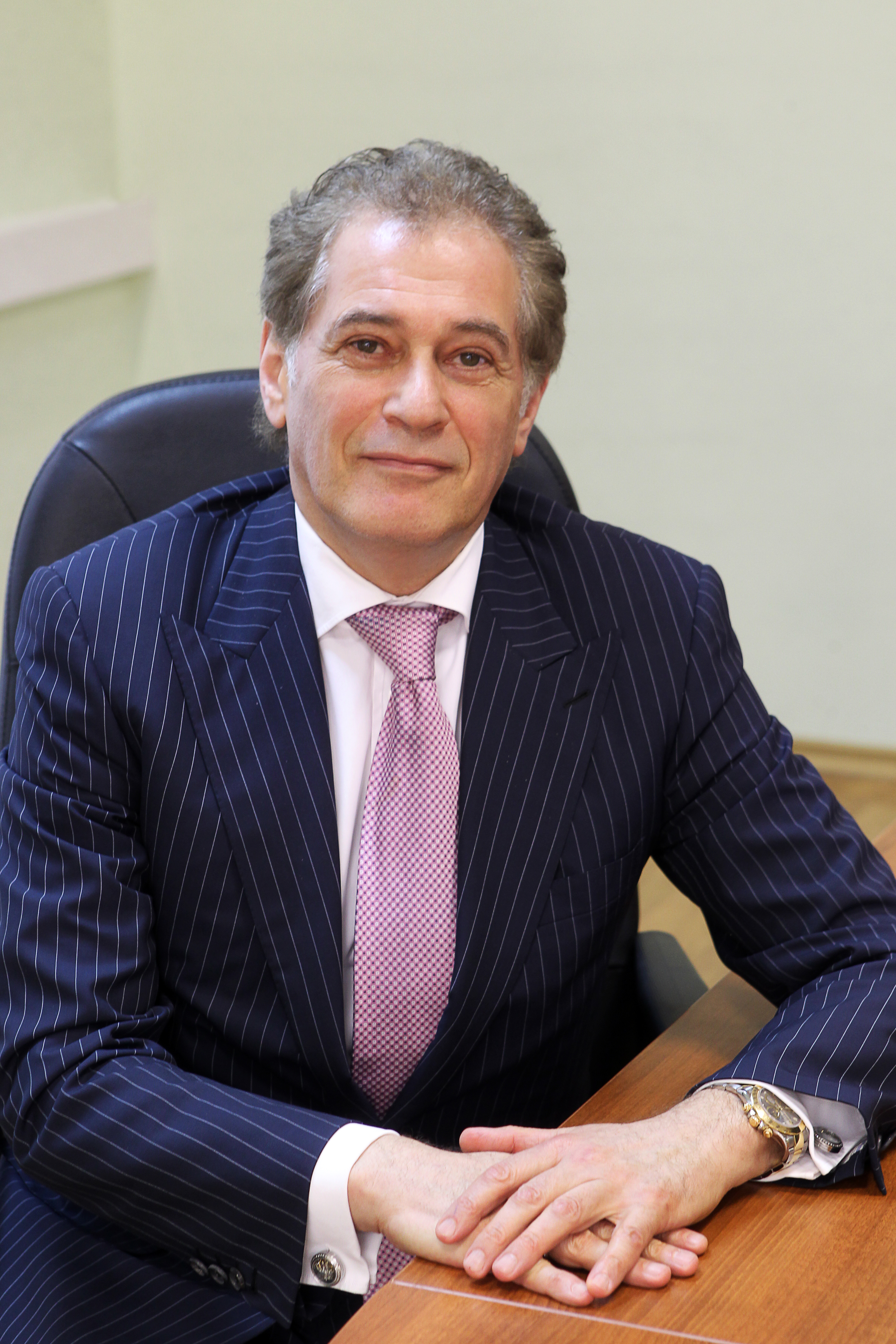
- Born: May 23, 1958 (age 68); Moscow, Soviet Union
- Education: Moscow State University of Civil Engineering
- Known for: Construction technology and systems engineering in construction
- Awards: Honored Builder of the Russian Federation (1999); Government of the Russian Federation Prize in Science and Technology (2005, 2023); Member-correspondent, Russian Academy of Architecture and Construction Sciences
- Scientific career
- Fields: Construction technology, organization of construction production, systems engineering in construction
- Workplaces: Moscow State University of Civil Engineering (MGSU)
- Doctoral advisor: L. I. Abramov; A. A. Gusakov; V. I. Telichenko
- Website: mgsu.ru

Azary Abramovich Lapidus (Азарий Абрамович Лапидус; born 23 May 1958, Moscow) is a Russian civil engineer, scientist, and professor specializing in construction technology and systems engineering in construction. He holds a Doctor of Technical Sciences degree and is a member-correspondent of the Russian Academy of Architecture and Construction Sciences. He has twice received the Government of the Russian Federation Prize in Science and Technology and is an Honored Builder of the Russian Federation.

Lapidus serves as head of the Department of Technology and Organization of Construction Production (TOSP) at the Moscow State University of Civil Engineering (MGSU) and is Vice President of the National Association of Surveyors and Designers (NOPRIZ).

== Early life and family ==
Lapidus was born in Moscow on 23 May 1958. His father, Abram Moiseevich Lapidus (1933–2011), was a laureate of the USSR State Prize and an Honored Inventor of the RSFSR, known for more than 250 patents and state awards including the Orders of the October Revolution and the Red Banner of Labour. His mother, Maya Azaryevna Lapidus (née Slobodkina; 1934–2015), was head of a laboratory at the Central Research and Design Institute for Rural Construction (TsNIIEPselstroy).

Lapidus is married to Svetlana Petrovna Lapidus (née Bogomolova; born 1968). The couple has four children: a son, Julij (born 1986), and daughters Natalya (born 1989), Ester (born 2000), and Daniela (born 2004).

== Education and academic career ==
Lapidus attended Specialized Physics-Mathematics School No. 2 in Moscow from 1971 to 1975, where courses were taught by professors from Moscow State University. He graduated from the Moscow Engineering and Construction Institute (MISi, now MGSU) in 1980 and was selected for a special group in "Theory of Structures" in 1976.

He completed his candidate of sciences degree (PhD equivalent) at the TsNIIEP Housing Institute in 1988 under Professor L. I. Abramov, defending a dissertation in technical sciences. He later earned his Doctor of Technical Sciences degree in 1997 under Professor V. I. Telichenko.

From 1997 to 2007, Lapidus participated in a research group on systems engineering in construction led by Professor A. A. Gusakov, which received the Government of the Russian Federation Prize in Science and Technology. He was awarded the title of Professor in 2002.

Lapidus co-authored federal university textbooks including Technology of Construction Processes and Technology of Building Erection (2000–2007), and the ten-volume textbook Technological Processes in Construction (2015–2016). He is the author of more than 200 scientific papers indexed in Scopus and Web of Science. His academic contributions include developing the concepts of "organizational structure design in construction" and "potential of organizational and technological solutions."

He has supervised two Doctors and 24 Candidates of Technical Sciences. In 2023, he became a member of the Russian Engineering Academy, and in 2024, a member-correspondent of the Russian Academy of Architecture and Construction Sciences.

== Professional career ==
Lapidus began his career at the Department of Testing of Structures, MISI, working as an engineer and research associate. He later served as General Director of CJSC "SUIproject" (1989–2003), President of CJSC "SUIholding" (2003–2006), and First Vice President of CJSC "Sistema-Hals" (2005–2008), where he oversaw more than 100 large-scale construction projects totaling over 1.5 million square meters.

Projects under his leadership reportedly included headquarters and residential complexes for RAO Gazprom, Stroytransgaz, retail centers, and hotels in Moscow, St. Petersburg, Kazan, Anapa, and Sochi. He also participated in the company's IPO on the London Stock Exchange, the first by a Russian development firm.

Between 2008 and 2015, Lapidus worked as a technical consultant for several Moscow-based companies, contributing to projects such as the Russian pavilion at EXPO 2010 (Shanghai), redevelopment of the Federal State Statistics Service complex, and sports facilities in Krasnodar. In 2012 he became head of the Department of Technology and Organization of Construction Production at MGSU.

== Professional and public service ==
Lapidus is Vice President of the National Association of Surveyors and Designers (NOPRIZ) and a member of the National Council of Surveyors and Designers. He has delivered lectures and presentations at international conferences and organized academic forums among construction universities.

== Awards and honors ==
=== State awards ===
- 1997 – Medal "In Commemoration of the 850th Anniversary of Moscow"
- 1999 – Honored Builder of the Russian Federation
- 2001 – Honorary Builder of Russia
- 2005 – Government of the Russian Federation Prize in Science and Technology
- 2023 – Government of the Russian Federation Prize in Science and Technology (second award)

=== Departmental and institutional honors ===
- Honorary Builder of Moscow (2000)
- Medals and honorary diplomas of Moscow State University of Civil Engineering (2001–2018)
- Honorary Mentor of the Ministry of Science and Higher Education (2023)

=== Professional and public awards ===
- Badge “For Merit” of the National Association of Builders (2013)
- Order “For Services in Construction” of the Russian Union of Builders (2018)
- Badge “For Contribution to the Construction Industry” of the National Association of Builders (2018)

== Selected works ==
- Lapidus, A. A. Organizational Design and Management of Large-Scale and Investment Projects. Moscow: Vokrug Sveta, 1997.
- Lapidus, A. A.; Telichenko, V. I.; Terentyev, O. M. Technology of Building Erection. Moscow: Vysshaya Shkola, 2001. ISBN 5-06-003992-7.
- Morozhenko, A. A.; Lapidus, A. A.; Telichenko, V. I. Information Modeling of Technologies and Business Processes in Construction. Moscow: Association of Construction Universities, 2008.
- Yershov, M. N.; Lapidus, A. A.; Telichenko, V. I. Technological Processes in Construction. Moscow: ASV, 2016.
- Lapidus, A. A.; Topchiy, D. V.; Abramov, I. L.; Pugach, E. M. Organizational-Technological Measures for the Assembly of Industrial Building Structures. Moscow: ASV, 2020.
- Lapidus, A. A.; Topchiy, D. V. Redevelopment of Industrial Territories in Urban Environments. Moscow: ASV, 2021.
- Lapidus, A. A.; Ovchinnikov, A. N. "Modeling of Information Flow Management under Customer Decision Influence." Moscow: ASV, 2021.

== Literary works ==
Lapidus is also the author of several works of fiction, including:

- Road Show, or The Love of an Oligarch (2008, ISBN 978-5-271-20121-9)
- Mont-Blanc, or The Unconquered Peak
- Maserati Bordeaux, or Equation with Three Unknowns
- To Be, Not to Seem
- Falling into the Heavens
- Crown

== See also ==
- Moscow State University of Civil Engineering
- Russian Academy of Architecture and Construction Sciences
