= Lapid (surname) =

Lapid is a surname with multiple origins:

- Hebrew: לַפִּיד, lit. "torch"), a Hebrew-language surname.
- "Lapid" is also a Hiligaynon language (Philippines) word denoting a galley with three banks of oars, also known as balangay.

Notable people with the surname include:

- Era Lapid (1948–2018), Israeli film editor and lecturer in cinema
- Erez Lapid (born 1971), Israeli mathematician
- Jess Lapid Jr. (born 1962), Filipino actor
- Jess Lapid Sr. (1933–1968), Filipino actor
- Lihi Lapid (born 1968), Israeli author, photojournalist, and columnist
- Lyn Lapid (born 2002), Filipino singer-songwriter
- Manuel "Lito" Lapid (born 1955), Filipino actor and politician
- Marco "Mark" Lapid (born 1980), Filipino actor and politician
- Nadav Lapid (born 1975), Israeli film director and screenwriter
- Percival "Percy Lapid" Mabasa (1959–2022), Filipino radio anchor
- Shulamit Lapid (born 1934), Israeli novelist and playwright
- Tommy Lapid (1931–2008), Israeli journalist and politician
- Yair Lapid (born 1963), 14th prime minister of Israel
