= Cassandra Ponti =

Filipino actress

- Born: Lejanie Palma Anigan; 1 March 1978 (age 48); Tagum, Philippines
- Occupations: Actress, dancer and model
- Years active: 2005–2010
- Children: 2

Lejanie Palma Anigan (born 1 March 1978), known professionally as Cassandra "Cass" Ponti, is a Filipino former actress, dancer, model, and reality television contestant. After spending 112 days inside the house on Pinoy Big Brother, Ponti garnered 214,188 votes, 18.9% of total votes, to place third in the Big Night finale.

Ponti was an FHM model with the screen name Honey V. She's well known for her passion in cooking, Visayan accent, and her caring for others, especially inside the Pinoy Big Brother house. She was the cover model of the October 2006 issue of Maxim Philippines and the November 2008 issue of Playboy Philippines.

Ponti studied at Saint Mary's College in Tagum City, Davao del Norte and was an entertainer in Japan before she became model and actress. She has 2 children, Leeam (born 2013) & Glee (Born 2015).

== Filmography ==
=== Movies ===
- Sabel (2004)
- Shake, Rattle and Roll VIII (2006)
- Enteng Kabisote 3: Okay Ka, Fairy Ko: The Legend Goes On and On and On (2006)
- Agent X44 (2007)
- Banal (2007)

=== TV appearances ===
- Rosalka as Jason's mother
- Kung Tayo'y Magkakalayo as Vega
- Maalaala Mo Kaya as Querida
- Komiks - various roles
- Babalik Kang Muli as Elyssa
- ASAP
- Boy & Kris
- Wowowee
- Abt Ur Luv
- Pinoy Big Brother
