= Mark Lapid =

Filipino actor and politician (born 1979)

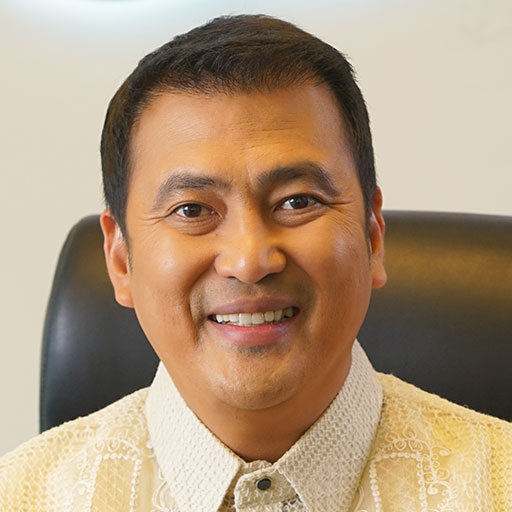
- Lapid in 2022

Chief Operating Officer of the Tourism Infrastructure and Enterprise Zone Authority
- Incumbent
- Assumed office January 11, 2021
- President: Rodrigo Duterte; Bongbong Marcos
- Preceded by: Pocholo Paragas

General Manager of Philippine Tourism Authority
- In office August 1, 2008 – October 14, 2015
- President: Gloria Macapagal Arroyo; Benigno Aquino III
- Preceded by: Robert Dean Barbers
- Succeeded by: Guiller Asido

31st Governor of Pampanga
- In office June 30, 2004 – June 30, 2007
- Vice Governor: Yeng Guiao
- Preceded by: Lito Lapid
- Succeeded by: Ed Panlilio

Personal details
- Born: Mark Tadeo Lapid; February 16, 1979 (age 47) San Fernando, Pampanga, Philippines
- Party: NPC (2018–present)
- Other political affiliations: Aksyon (2015–2018); Independent (2007–2015); Lakas (2003–2007)
- Spouse: Tanya Garcia (m. 2010)
- Children: 3
- Parent(s): Lito Lapid; Marissa Tadeo
- Relatives: Ysabel Ortega (half-sister)
- Education: Angeles University Foundation; University of the Philippines, Los Baños; Pamantasan ng Lungsod ng Maynila (D.B.A)
- Occupation: Politician, actor

Mark Tadeo Lapid (born February 16, 1979) is a Filipino actor and politician. He is a former Governor of Pampanga from 2004 to 2007. President Gloria Arroyo appointed him as general manager of the Philippine Tourism Authority in 2008. From 2009 to 2016, he served as chief operating officer of the Tourism Infrastructure and Enterprise Zone Authority (TIEZA) under President Benigno Aquino III. TIEZA is an attached agency of the Department of Tourism (DOT) that designates, regulates and supervises tourism enterprise zones established under Republic Act 9593. Lapid returned to the government agency in 2021 after his appointment as TIEZA chief by President Rodrigo Duterte on January 5, 2021.

== Political career ==
Mark Lapid began his career in public service at a very young age. He was elected as SK (Sanggunian Kabataan) Chairman at the age of 16. Concurrently, Lapid served as the province's youth sector representative in the Sangguniang Panlalawigan of Pampanga.

He was elected Governor of Pampanga in 2004 at the young age of 24. He replace his father, outgoing Governor Lito Lapid, who was elected as senator that year. While Governor, Lapid successfully made Pampanga one of the top ten most productive provinces in the Philippines. Lapid's tenure as Governor was marked by an increase in infrastructure spending. In 2007, he run again for re-election but he lost on his second attempt against former clergy Ed Panlilio, and Baby Pineda.

Lapid filed his CoC (Certificate of Candidacy) for Senator on October 14, 2015. Lapid ran under the Koalisyon ng Daang Matuwid but lost placing 19th in the polls, behind coalition mate, Jericho Petilla.

In a senatorial forum held on January 29, 2016, at the University of the Philippines – Diliman, he supported peace in Mindanao and same-sex marriage, which gave him one of the best approval applause from the students of UP.

In 2019, Lapid run for Mayor of Porac, Pampanga under Nationalist People's Coalition but he lost to incumbent Mayor Jing Capil.

== Acting career ==
Lapid did the film Apoy sa Dibdib ng Samar (2006) with Cristine Reyes, directed by Jose Balagtas.

His film Tatlong Baraha, was an entry to the Metro Manila Film Festival (MMFF) in 2006. He played the role of Julio Valiente, Maynard Lapid as Zigomar, and Lito Lapid as Leon Guerrero.

Lapid produced the movie Lapu-Lapu starring Lito Lapid and Joyce Jimenez.

== Personal life ==
He is among the four children of actor and Senator Lito Lapid and Marissa Tadeo-Lapid. His siblings are Maan Krista, Mitzi Karen and Maynard. He also has half-siblings such as Manuelito Lapid and Ysabel Ortega.

He is married to actress Tanya Garcia in a civil wedding on July 30, 2010, at Marissa Hall in Porac, Pampanga. They have two daughters, Mischa Amidala (born September 16, 2007), and Matilda Anika (born October 29, 2010) in Las Vegas, Nevada

== Filmography ==
=== Film ===
==== As actor ====
Year	Title	Role	Note(s)	Ref(s).
1999	Largado, Ibabalik Kita sa Pinanggalingan Mo!			
2001	Mahal Kita... Kahit Sino Ka Pa!	Anton		
2001	Dugong Aso: Mabuting Kaibigan, Masamang Kaaway	Leon Geronimo		
2002	Pistolero	Valdez		
2006	Apoy sa Dibdib ng Samar	Daniel Giron		
2006	Batas Militar	Capt. Miguel Cortez		
2006	Tatlong Baraha	Julian / Doc Julius / Julio Valiente		
2011	Ang Panday 2	Kapitan		
2012	Pacer 3			
2012	Pinoy Super Kid			
2014	ABNKKBSNPLAko!?			
2017	Ang Panday			
2018	Jack Em Popoy: The Puliscredibles	SPO2 Gregorio Morales		
2019	3pol Trobol: Huli Ka Balbon!	Noel Pahak		
2022	Apag			

==== As producer only ====
- Lapu-Lapu (2002)

=== Television ===
Year	Title	Role	Ref(s)
2013	Little Champ	Young Leon "Amang" del Torro	
2017–2019	FPJ's Ang Probinsyano	Anton "Tigre" de Mundo	
2019–2020	Sandugo	Darius Guerrero	
2023–2026	FPJ's Batang Quiapo	Benjamin "Ben" Camacho	
2026	Sigabo	Tony Castor	
