= Lito Lapid =

Senator of the Philippines since 2019 and actor (born 1955)

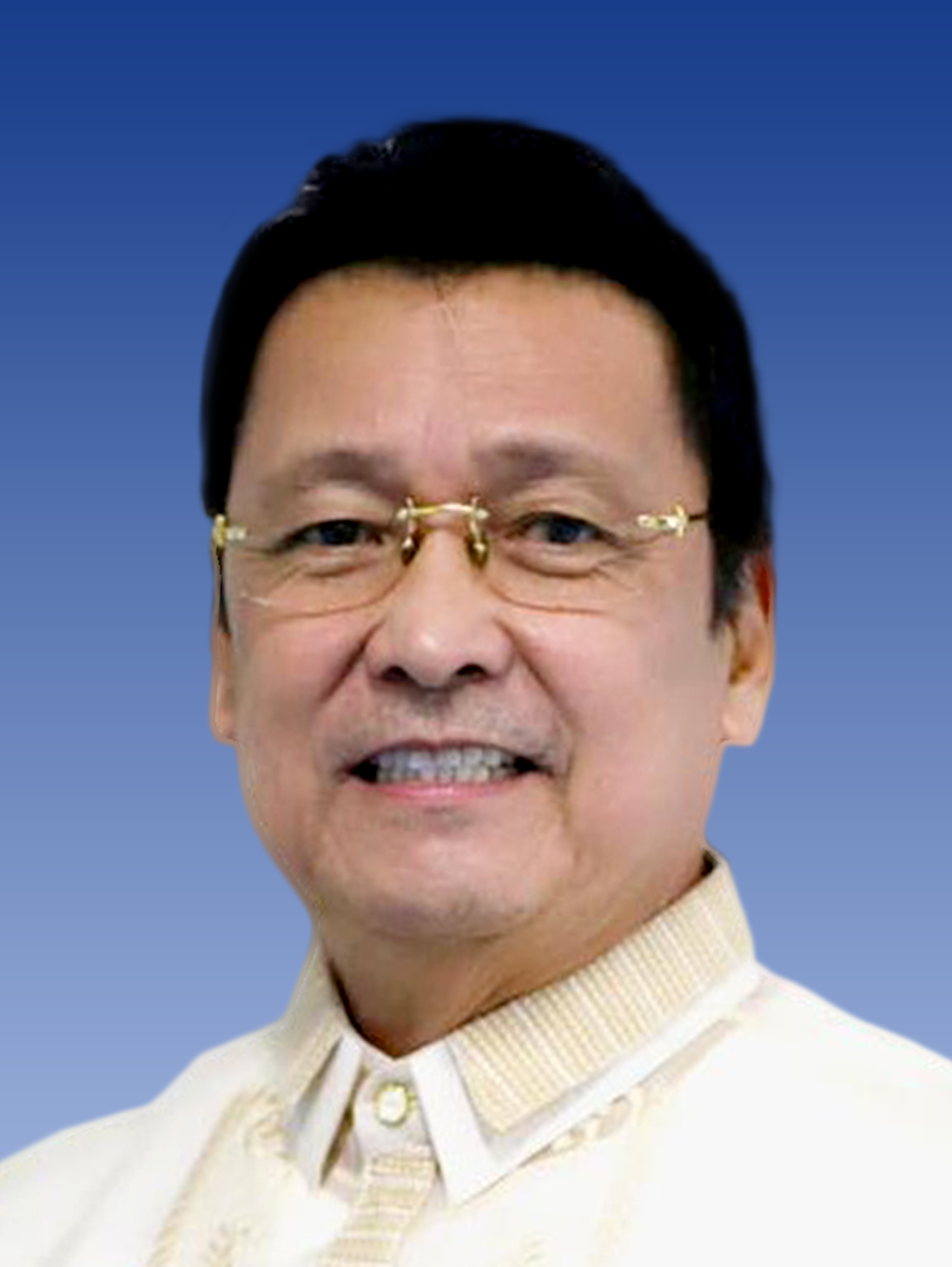
- Lapid in 2025

Senator of the Philippines
- Incumbent
- Assumed office June 30, 2019
- In office June 30, 2004 – June 30, 2016

Chair of the Senate Cooperatives Committee
- Incumbent
- Assumed office September 10, 2025
- Preceded by: Imee Marcos

Chair of the Senate Urban Planning, Housing and Resettlement Committee
- Incumbent
- Assumed office August 4, 2025
- Preceded by: Imee Marcos

Chair of the Senate Tourism Committee
- In office May 20, 2024 – June 30, 2025
- Preceded by: Nancy Binay
- Succeeded by: JV Ejercito
- In office July 25, 2010 – June 30, 2016
- Preceded by: Francis Pangilinan
- Succeeded by: Nancy Binay

Chair of the Senate Games and Amusement Committee
- In office July 22, 2019 – July 23, 2024
- Preceded by: Panfilo Lacson
- Succeeded by: Mark Villar

30th Governor of Pampanga
- In office June 30, 1995 – June 30, 2004
- Vice Governor: Cielo Macapagal-Salgado (1995–1998); Clayton Olalia (1998–2001); Mikey Arroyo (2001–2004)
- Preceded by: Bren Guiao
- Succeeded by: Mark Lapid

Vice Governor of Pampanga
- In office June 30, 1992 – June 30, 1995
- Governor: Bren Guiao
- Preceded by: Cielo Macapagal-Salgado
- Succeeded by: Cielo Macapagal-Salgado

Personal details
- Born: Manuel Mercado Lapid; October 25, 1955 (age 70) Porac, Pampanga, Philippines
- Party: NPC (1992–1998; 2018–present)
- Other political affiliations: Lingap Lugud (2015–2018); Independent (2012–2015); Lakas–CMD (1998–2012)
- Spouse: Marissa Tadeo
- Children: 6, including Mark and Ysabel
- Occupation: Politician, actor

Manuel "Lito" Mercado Lapid (Tagalog: [manˈwel ˈlito ˈlapid]; born October 25, 1955) is a Filipino actor, director and politician serving as a Senator since 2019, and previously from 2004 to 2016. He started his political career in Pampanga, serving as vice governor from 1992 to 1995, and governor from 1995 to 2004.

== Early life and education ==
Lapid was born in Porac, Pampanga on October 25, 1955. He is the fifth child out of nine children of Jose Songco Lapid and Eleuteria Mercado. He completed his elementary education at the Porac Central School in 1968 and secondary education at St. Catherine's Academy in Porac in 1972. He did not enroll for his tertiary education as he pursued acting.

== Acting career ==
Lapid entered the film industry as a stuntman, and became an actor. He is the nephew of Jess Lapid and the cousin of Jess Lapid Jr. His appearance in The Jess Lapid Story got him noticed in the film industry.

== Political career ==
=== As provincial governor ===
In the 1992 general election he ran under the opposition block Nationalist People's Coalition as vice governor of Pampanga, and defeated the incumbent vice governor Cielo Macapagal-Salgado.

In 1995, he ran for governor of Pampanga under the same party against Governor Bren Guiao, who had the support of former President Corazon Aquino, and won. When he sought a second term in 1998, Lapid joined the administration party Lakas-NUCD. After the impeachment of President Joseph Estrada in 2000 and the second EDSA Revolution the following year, he ran again for his final term and won.

He decided to run as mayor of Angeles City, in the 2004 elections but abandoned his plans when he was encouraged to run as a senator.

In 2009, Lapid and his son Mark Lapid faced plunder charges for allegedly not remitting P500 million in quarrying fees while they were governor of Pampanga. Ombudsman Merceditas Gutierrez cleared Lito and Mark Lapid of the plunder charges in 2011, in what has been described as a "midnight order" signed a month before Gutierrez's resignation. Gutierrez resigned in April 2011 amid allegations of protecting former President Gloria Macapagal Arroyo and her political allies.

==== Fertilizer fund scam ====
In 2014, the Ombudsman found Lapid liable for the purchase of P5 million in overpriced fertilizers, through funds allegedly diverted to the 2004 election campaign of Gloria Macapagal Arroyo. According to the Ombudsman, the Pampanga provincial government under Lapid bought 3,880 liters of overpriced fertilizer at P1,250 per liter without public bidding, violating the Anti-Graft and Corrupt Practices Act, the Government Procurement Act, and the Revised Penal Code. The Fertilizer Fund scam case was the eighth graft case filed against Lapid before the Ombudsman.

In 2015, Lapid was charged for graft over his alleged involvement in the 2004 Fertilizer Fund scam while he was governor of Pampanga. The case was dismissed in 2016 by the Sandiganbayan anti-graft court due to the "inordinate delay" in the investigation, but the Supreme Court reversed the dismissal in 2019.

=== Senate ===
Lapid doing a bill sponsorship speech at the Senate

Lapid during the impeachment trial of Sara Duterte

During the 2004 Senatorial elections, then-president Gloria Macapagal Arroyo encouraged Lapid to run as a senator under the administration coalition K4. He accepted the offer and won the election where he placed eleventh. During his first term, he ran for mayor of Makati in 2007, but lost to incumbent Mayor Jejomar Binay; thus, he kept his Senate seat.

In May 2010, he was re-elected as senator, placing 11th in the overall ranking. He ran under the Lakas–CMD but subsequently left the party in 2012 and served until 2016 as an independent. He was chairman of the Senate Committee on Tourism and Cooperatives. As he was ineligible to seek another re-election to the Senate, Lapid ran for mayor of Angeles City in 2016, but lost to incumbent Mayor Edgardo Pamintuan.

Lapid's office acknowledged that P5 million of his pork barrel was used in 2011 to purchase anti-dengue innoculants for Polillo, Quezon. The funds were allegedly misused as part of the pork barrel scam, since there were no reported cases of dengue fever in Polillo in 2011.

Lapid sought for a comeback to the Senate in 2019 and won, placing 7th overall. He earned his third nonconsecutive term.

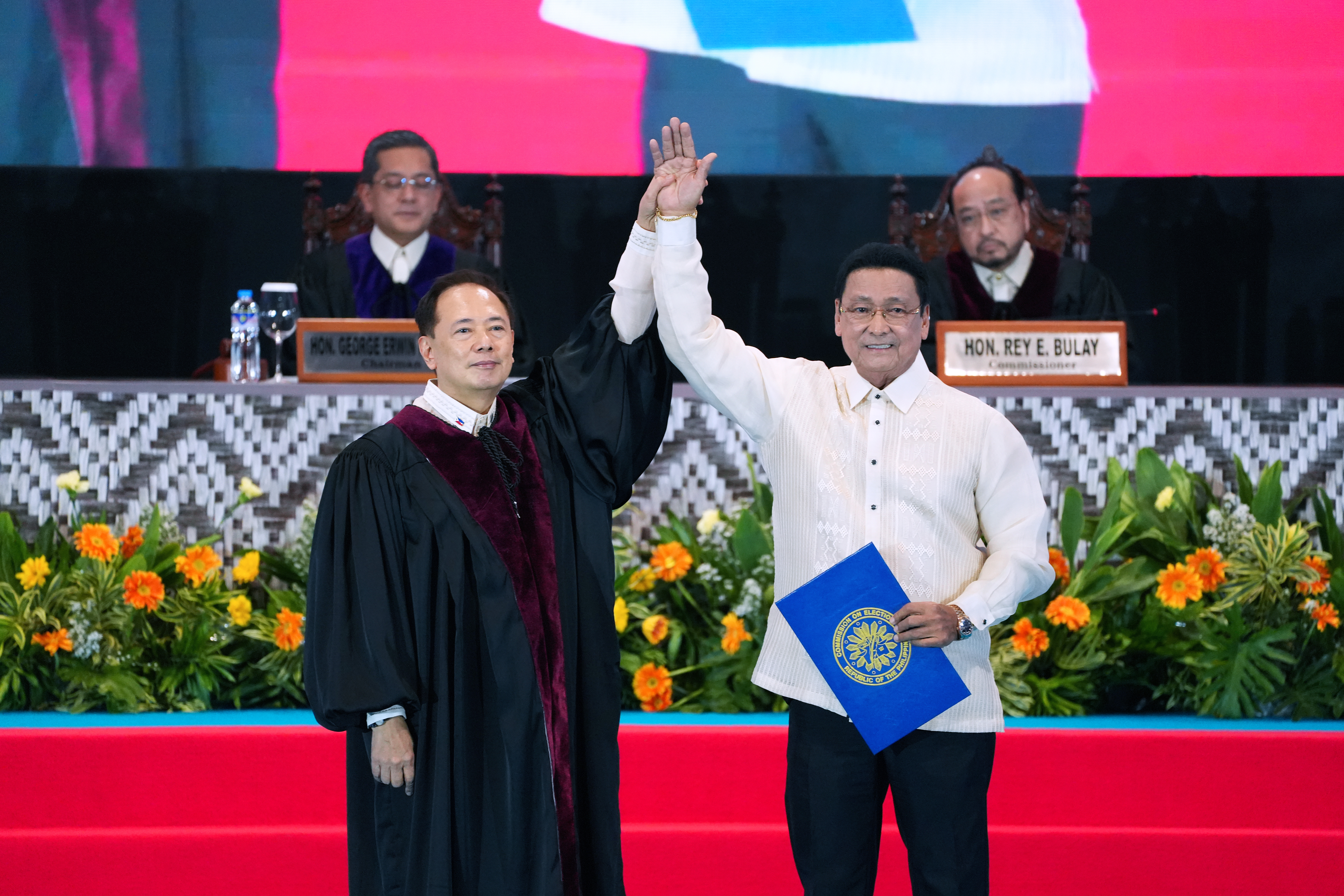
Lapid being proclaimed as a senator-elect on May 17, 2025

Lapid was re-elected as senator in 2025 and was a part of the Administration Slate, Alyansa para sa Bagong Pilipinas. He placed 11th overall.

== Personal life ==
Lapid is married to Marissa Tadeo, with whom he has four children including Mark. Lapid also has a child with former supermodel Melanie Marquez and another, actress Ysabel Ortega with former singer, Michelle Ortega.

== Electoral history ==
Electoral history of Lito Lapid
Year	Office	Party	Votes received				Result
Year	Office	Party	Total	%	P.	Swing	Result
1992	Vice Governor of Pampanga	NPC	—N/a	—N/a	1st	—N/a	Won
1995	Governor of Pampanga	NPC	432,932	—N/a	1st	—N/a	Won
1998	Governor of Pampanga	Lakas	—N/a	—N/a	1st	—N/a	Won
2001	Governor of Pampanga	Lakas	501,238	92.22%	1st	—N/a	Won
2004	Senator of the Philippines	Lakas	10,970,941	30.90%	11th	—N/a	Won
2010	Senator of the Philippines	Lakas	11,025,805	28.90%	11th	-2.00	Won
2019	Senator of the Philippines	NPC	16,965,464	35.87%	7th	+6.97	Won
2025	Senator of the Philippines	NPC	13,394,102	23.35%	11th	-12.52	Won
2007	Mayor of Makati	Lakas	22,461	10.09%	2nd	—N/a	Lost
2016	Mayor of Angeles City	Lingap Lugud	45,710	33.83%	2nd	—N/a	Lost

== Filmography ==
=== Film ===
Year	Title	Role
1968	Leon Guerrero: Laban sa 7 Kilabot	
1972	Geronimo	
1973	Ang Alamat ni Leon Guerrero	
1975	Nagmula sa Lupa	Totoy
1976	Mrs. Eva Fonda, 16	
1976	Enter the Panther	
1978	The Jess Lapid Story	Jess Lapid
1979	Bruce the Super Hero	Rocky Robledo
1979	Batang Salabusab	
1979	Alas at Reyna	
1979	Death Has No Mercy	
1979	Lipulin... Masasamang Loob (Highway Patrol)	
1979	Ang Sisiw Ay Isang Agila	
1980	Ang Pagbabalik ni Leon Guerrero	Leon Guerrero
1980	Kastilyong Buhangin	Oscar
1980	Diego Sta. Cruz	Diego Sta. Cruz
1980	Yakapin Mo 'Ko, Lalaking Matapang	
1980	Kalibre .45	
1981	Viva Santiago	Aguinaldo
1981	Kamaong Asero	
1981	San Basilio	Julio Valiente
1981	Tatlong Baraha	Leon Guerrero
1982	Isaac... Dugo ni Abraham	Isaac
1982	Ang Tapang para sa Lahat!	
1982	Anak ng Tulisan	
1982	Isla Sto. Nino	
1982	Hanggang sa Wakas	
1983	Pedro Tunasan	Pedro Tunasan
1983	Gamu-gamo sa Pugad Lawin	Alberto
1983	The Gunfighter	Tejan
1984	Barakuda	
1984	Zigomar	Zigomar
1984	Lukas	Lukas
1984	Da Best in the Da West	
1984	Alakdang Bato	Donato
1984	Angkan ng Siste Reales	
1984	Mga Walang Daigdig	
1984	Julian Vaquero	Julian Vaquero
1985	Abandonado	
1985	Ben Tumbling: A People's Journal Story	Ben Tumbling
1985	Walang Katapat	
1985	Hari ng Gatilyo	
1985	Calapan Jailbreak	
1985	Sa Bawat Hahakbangan, Babaha ng Dugo	Danilo Saberon
1986	Macho Gigolo	Manny Agbayani
1986	No Return, No Exchange	Abe
1986	Asong Gubat	Geron
1986	Kamagong	Manuel
1986	Desperado	
1987	Maruso	Romeo Maruso
1987	Cabarlo	Fred Cabarlo
1987	Barbaro Santo	David Manabat / Elias dela Cruz
1988	Akyat Bahay Gang	Ricardo "Carding" Dacanay
1988	Ex-Army	Lt. Emil Matriano
1988	Sa Likod ng Kasalanan	
1989	Tadtarin ng Bala si Madelo	Lt. Thomas Madelo
1989	Jones Bridge Massacre (Task Force Clabio)	Lt. Col. Aladdin Dimagmaliw
1989	Sgt. Melgar	Sgt. Rodolfo Melgar
1990	Ibabaon Kita sa Lupa!	Joaquin Salazar
1990	Kahit Singko, Hindi Ko Babayaran ang Buhay Mo	David
1990	Karapatan Ko ang Pumatay! -Kapitan Guti	Capt. Guti
1990	Walang Piring ang Katarungan	Sgt. Fidel Ronquillo
1991	Hindi Palulupig	Romano Magtanggol
1991	Lt. Jack Moreno: Medal of Valor – Habang Nasusugatan Lalong Tumatapang	Lt. Jack Moreno
1992	Dudurugin Kita ng Bala Ko	Reden Verdadero
1992	Lacson, Batas ng Navotas	Narsing Lacson
1993	Gascon, Bala ang Katapat Mo	Capt. Florencio Gascon
1993	Aguinaldo	Gov. Rodolfo Aguinaldo
1994	Geron Olivar	Geron Olivar
1994	Macario Durano	Macario Durano
1995	Ikaw Pa Eh, Love Kita	Sgt. Esteban Samonte
1995	Hanggang sa Huling Bala	David
1995	Sa Iyo ang Pampanga, Akin ang Bulacan	
1995	Escobar: Walang Sasantuhin	Capt. Salvador Escobar
1996	Tolentino	Ramon Tolentino
1996	Hindi Lahat ng Ahas Ay nasa Gubat	
1996	Tapatan ng Tapang	Paul
1996	Da Best in da West 2: Da Western Pulis Istori	Larry Lopez
1997	Tapang sa Tapang	Dante Parcon
1997	Kasangga Mo Ako Hanggang sa Huling Laban	Benjo Aragon
1998	Alamid: Ang Alamat	Alamid (Old)
1998	Lisensyado	Capt. Aladin Esguera
1999	Tatapatan Ko ang Lakas Mo	Rommel Cruz
1999	Ako'y Ibigin Mo... Lalaking Matapang	Leon
1999	Largado	Attorney Randy Reyes
2000	Fidel Jimenez: Magkasubukan Tayo	Capt. Fidel Jimenez
2000	Patigasan	
2000	Pasasabugin Ko ang Mundo Mo	
2000	Huwag Mong Ubusin ang Bait Ko!	Sgt. Rolando Serrano
2000	Eskort	Angelo
2001	Masikip Na ang Mundo Mo, Labrador	Capt. Ramon Labrador
2001	Bukas, Babaha ng Dugo	Felix Mercado
2001	Dugong Aso: Mabuting Kaibigan, Masamang Kaaway	Barangay Chairman
2002	Lapu-Lapu	Lapu-Lapu
2006	Tatlong Baraha	Leon Guerrero
2017	Ang Panday	Apo
2018	Jack Em Popoy: The Puliscredibles	Sgt. Domingo
2021	Mang Jose	Inkredibol Diego
2022	Apag	Alfredo Tuazon
TBA	Untitled Brillante Mendoza film	

=== Television ===
Year	Title	Role	Notes	Ref(s)
2013	Little Champ	Leon "Amang" del Torro	Main Role	
2017–2019	FPJ's Ang Probinsyano	Romulo "Leon" Dumaguit	Main Role / Protagonist	
2023–2025	FPJ's Batang Quiapo	Supremo "Primo" C. Medina	Main Role / Anti-Hero / Protagonist	
