= List of Sa Ngalan ng Ina characters =

This article contains cast and character information of the TV5 political drama Sa Ngalan ng Ina. It was the premiere offering of TV5 Mini Serye that is set to air only for a month.

== Main cast ==
- Nora Aunor as Gov. Elena Toribio vda de. Deogracias

She is the second wife of Dr. Armando "Amang" Deogracias, who is the mayor of the town of Salvacion. Before the Miting de Avance, she had a dream about her husband in fear that he might be in danger in his candidacy for the governorship. During the political rally, Amang was assassinated by a grenade explosion killing him instantly. She is being disowned by her eldest stepdaughter Andrea Deogracias, but loved by her youngest stepson Angelo. She is being supported by her younger sister Pacita and her niece Elsa. She was pick by the Partido Obrero (Worker's Party) to be the candidate for governorship of the province of Verano. She would also have to choose between her people and her children.

- Christopher De Leon as Gov. Jose "Pepe" Ilustre

The current governor of the province of Verano who is a paraplegic. The people took the blame on Pepe for the murder of Amang. He is being lured by his wife Lucia in winning the elections. He had a past with Elena before he married Lucia.

== Supporting cast ==
- Ian de Leon as Zaldy Sanchez

The loyal personal security of Amang. He is also loyal to Elena and to her stepchildren. Little did they know is that, he is having an affair with Lucia Ilustre.

- Rosanna Roces as Lucia Ilustre

The greedy and manipulative wife of Pepe. She is doing everything she wants for her husband to keep in power. But, she is having an affair with Zaldy, who is the personal bodyguard of Amang.

- Nadine Samonte as Atty. Andrea Deogracias

The eldest daughter of Amang and stepdaughter of Elena. She is the municipal mayor of Salvacion. She dislikes Elena very much especially when Amang died. Andrea thinks that Elena wants to be inherited by Amang. She is engaged to Ramoncito Concepcion, but find more time in politics than her love to Ramoncito.

- Alwyn Uytingco as Alfonso Deogracias

The second child of Amang and stepson of Elena. He is always involved in drugs and violence. He became more rebellious upon the death of Amang. He is always being arrested for the violence that he did. He will do everything he had to seek justice for his father's death.

- Edgar Allan Guzman as Angelo Deogracias

The youngest child of Amang and stepson of Elena who is a policeman. Among the stepchildren of Elena, he is really close to Elena. He is also the boyfriend of Carmela, although their families are in dispute.

- Eula Caballero as Elsa Toribio

The daughter of Pacita and is a juvenile diabetic. Along with Pacita, they were adopted by Amang and treated them as a family.

- Karel Marquez as Carmela Ilustre

The only daughter of Pepe and Lucia. She doesn't know everything about the dispute of her family with the Deogracias. Although there are dispute with the two families, she had time with her boyfriend Angelo.

- Eugene Domingo as Pacita Toribio

The younger sister of Elena and Elsa's mother. She works for Elena and became confidant.

- Joross Gamboa as Ramoncito Concepcion

Andrea's fiancée. They are set to be married, but, upon the death of Amang, she had no time for Ramoncito, as she is more focus on her candidacy for mayor. He would try to convince Andrea to learn to accept Elena as her stepmother.

- Jay Aquitania as Manuel

Pepe's personal secretary. He is always beside governor Pepe.

== Extended cast ==
- Raquel Villavicencio as Vice Gov. Dorinda Fernando

The Vice Governor of the province of Verano. She will also be Elena's adviser on her candidacy as Amang's replacement as the candidate of Partido Obrero.

- Leo Rialp as Apo Lucas

The leader of Partido Obrero. When Elena won as governor, he became the dictator of Elena.

== Special participation ==
- Bembol Roco as Dr. Armando "Amang" Deogracias

The mayor of Salvacion and wife of Elena. He is running for governor of the province. However, during a rally, a grenade was thrown on stage and exploded, killing him.
