= List of Dear Uge episodes =

Dear Uge is a Philippine television comedy anthology broadcast by GMA Network. Starring Eugene Domingo and Divine Aucina, it premiered on February 14, 2016 on the network's Sunday Grande sa Hapon line up replacing Wowowin. In 2020, Domingo was now started to acting for her portrayal in different love stories and other issues in this show. Also, in 2021, as the show have a new format, it also releases new episodes starting May 30 and Domingo has a different special portraying personas.

== Series overview ==
Year	Episodes	Originally released	
Year	Episodes	First released	Last released
2016	TBA	February 14, 2016	December 25, 2016
2017	TBA	January 1, 2017	December 31, 2017
2018	TBA	January 7, 2018	December 30, 2018
2019	TBA	January 6, 2019	December 29, 2019
2020	TBA	January 5, 2020	December 27, 2020
2021	TBA	January 3, 2021	February 13, 2022

== Episode list ==
=== 2021 ===
No.	Title	Cast	Original release date
1	"Jing, Ang Bato! (Part 1)"	Eugene Domingo: Jing Capuyo	January 10, 2021
Supporting Cast: Richard Yap as Julio Abril, Paul Salas as PJ Abril, Ashley Rivera as Olga, Jay Arcilla as Bob, Angel Guardian as Marcia
2	"Jing, Ang Bato! (Part 2)"	Eugene Domingo: Jing Capuyo	January 17, 2021
Supporting Cast: Richard Yap as Julio Abril, Paul Salas as PJ Abril, Ashley Rivera as Olga, Jay Arcilla as Bob, Angel Guardian as Marcia
TBA	"Gangstah Sistah"	Katrina Halili: Badette / Red Pepper	May 30, 2021 (replay on September 5, 2021)
Supporting Cast: Rob Sy as Matador, Buboy Villar as Dogs, Gil Cuerva as Pogi, Kate Valdez as Angela; Guest: Eugene Domingo as Boy Girly
TBA	"Community Pan-Thief"	Rochelle Pangilinan: Victoria; Royce Cabrera: Don	June 6, 2021
Supporting Cast: Lexi Gonzales as Zara, Ayra Mariano as Chloe, Therese Malvar as Monique; Guest: Eugene Domingo as Dr. Nina Kwan
TBA	"Ba-Girls"	Manilyn Reynes: Pipay; Kitkat: Shonda	June 13, 2021
Supporting Cast: Yasser Marta as Gabby Muhlach; Guest: Eugene Domingo as Tita G.
TBA	"Coma Period"	Ruru Madrid: Alex	June 20, 2021
Supporting Cast: Archie Alemania as Roger / Punisher, Rodjun Cruz as Manny, Jelai Andres as Jessica; Guest: Eugene Domingo as Madam D.
TBA	"Bash the Basher"	Ashley Ortega: Yaya Pebbles; Paul Salas: Wacko	June 27, 2021
Supporting Cast: Kiray Celis as Yaya Genevieve; Guest: Eugene Domingo as Yaya Chismosa
TBA	"While You We're Forgetting"	Alex Diaz: Armand; Analyn Barro: Vicky	July 4, 2021
Supporting Cast: Anjo Damiles as John; Guest: Eugene Domingo as Lulu Teng-Tan
TBA	"K-Pak Ghorl"	Arra San Agustin: Kim	July 11, 2021
Supporting Cast: Kokoy de Santos as Pedro, Candy Pangilinan as Melissa, Lianne Valentin as Petra, Hyojong Kim as Park So Hyun; Guest: Eugene Domingo as Ms. Kori Kong / Bibim Bap
TBA	"Kill Joy"	Valeen Montenegro: Joy Arellano	July 18, 2021
Supporting Cast: Antonio Aquitania as Zero, John Feir as Jonel; Guest: Eugene Domingo as Ms. Ekaterina Artyomov
TBA	"Shout Up!"	Sanya Lopez: Angie Berde	July 25, 2021
Supporting Cast: David Licauco as Fiel Rodriguez, Cai Cortez as Narda, Mel Kimura as Evelyn Silencio; Guest: Eugene Domingo as Ms. Peace Tingyawa
TBA	"My Special Delivery"	Pokwang: Chit	August 1, 2021
Supporting Cast: Elle Villanueva as Baby, Mahal as Dyosa; Guest: Eugene Domingo as Maya-Maya Mulawin
TBA	"Manananggal"	Rita Avila: Luciana	August 8, 2021
Supporting Cast: Divine Tetay as Tomas, Mosang as Teresing, Shayne Sava as Dolores; Guest: Eugene Domingo as Apang Haphap Inawi
TBA	"5-6 Na, 1-2-3 Pa!"	Lovely Abella: Zoraida; Mark Herras: Manuelito	August 15, 2021
Supporting Cast: Ervic Vijandre as Dwight, Divine Aucina as Cara; Guest: Eugene Domingo as Nicole Ngarag
TBA	"My Steph Ma'am"	Ysabel Ortega: Anna	August 22, 2021
Supporting Cast: LJ Reyes as Stephanie Tuazon, Wendell Ramos as Daddy Paul, Tess Antonio as Yaya Josie; Guest: Eugene Domingo as Nella Bratinella
TBA	"Tom, Dick and Gery"	Benjamin Alves: Tom; Mike Tan: Dick; Myrtle Sarrosa: Gery	August 29, 2021
Supporting Cast: Dave Bornea as Alex; Guest: Eugene Domingo as Babygurlz0237
TBA	"Soul ni Sol"	Boobay: Sol	September 12, 2021
Supporting Cast: Thea Tolentino as Ella, Jennie Gabriel as Dora, Arthur Solinap as Karl, Kevin Santos as Tagasundo; Guest: Eugene Domingo as Ning
TBA	"Deadz Ako Sa 'Yo!"	Rhian Ramos: Aloha	September 19, 2021
Supporting Cast: Paolo Contis as Tats, Karenina Haniel as Cassy; Guest: Eugene Domingo as Mary Juana Habpan
TBA	"Labing-isang Daliri"	Andrea Torres: Pining	September 26, 2021
Supporting Cast: Jason Abalos as Gabby, Kristoffer Martin as Lexor, Denise Barbacena as Nini; Guest: Eugene Domingo as Peng Chiu
TBA	"What's My Name?"	Rafael Rosell: Tinola "Ino" Cruz / Maximilian Andromedus Atlas Cruz (Note: Because of their humorous names, Cruz siblings explains why they named "Tinola" and "Pinakbeth" just because of their mother's favorite food. So, they decided to go to the registry office to change their names as "Maximilus Andromedus Atlas Cruz" and "Savannah Beatrice Atlas Cruz" but they are accused by the police as they both become "wanted" from their criminal charges.); Pauline Mendoza: Pinakbeth "Beth" Cruz / Savanna Beatrice Atlas Cruz (Note: Because of their humorous names, Cruz siblings explains why they named "Tinola" and "Pinakbeth" just because of their mother's favorite food. So, they decided to go to the registry office to change their names as "Maximilus Andromedus Atlas Cruz" and "Savannah Beatrice Atlas Cruz" but they are accused by the police as they both become "wanted" from their criminal charges.)	October 3, 2021
Supporting Cast: Faye Lorenzo as Red Carpet / Rhodora Velasquez, Dang Cruz as a registry officer Guest: Eugene Domingo as Ligaya Paraiso / Lourdes Hugot Takipsilim (Note: Aside from "Tinola" and "Pinakbeth" siblings, Ligaya Paraiso, played by Eugene Domingo which was a special guest of the episode "What's My Name?", also have a previous name as "Lourdes Hugot Takipsilim" which she feels irritated and disappointed about her name. But somehow, she explains literally on how to make a reliable name which was very reliable to him or her, specially from newborn babies.)
TBA	"Ampon ng Kadiliman"	Jamir Zabarte: Amante	October 10, 2021
Supporting Cast: Maureen Larrazabal as Madame Hussein, Zonia Mejia as Angelica, Jojit Lorenzo as Nonong; Guest: Eugene Domingo as Sister Angelica Kerubin Arcangel
TBA	"Ganda Ka, Teh?"	Cai Cortez: Tabby; Kim Rodriguez: Betty	October 17, 2021
Supporting Cast: Luke Conde as Sam, Dennis Padilla as Joe; Guest: Eugene Domingo as Chef Chefan
TBA	"Macho Dancer Daw Ako?"	EA Guzman: Adam; Lucho Ayala: Daniel	October 31, 2021
Supporting Cast: Lexi Gonzales as Rebecca "Becca", Nikki Co as Marky; Guest: Eugene Domingo as Kerrie Kinembot
