= Chariz Solomon =

Filipino actress and comedian (born 1989)

- Born: Charyze Solomon Pagotan; August 22, 1989 (age 37); Manila, Philippines
- Occupations: Actress; model; comedian; singer
- Years active: 2006–present
- Agent: Sparkle
- Height: 162.6 cm (5 ft 4 in)
- Spouse: Nestor Ng (m. 2012; sep. 2018)
- Partner: Vince Teotico (2019)
- Children: 3

Charyze Solomon Pagotan (born August 22, 1989), known professionally as Chariz Solomon, is a Filipino actress and comedian. She first appeared as a contestant on the talent search show StarStruck: The Next Level and later gained wider recognition for her roles and appearances in television comedy programs such as JejeMom (2009), Bubble Gang, and Pepito Manaloto (2013–present).

== Personal life ==
Chariz is the eldest of four children born to an Irish-Filipino soldier and a Filipina entertainer based in Japan. Her parents separated when she was four years old. She later enrolled at the University of Santo Tomas to pursue a degree in Tourism but did not complete her studies. Following her departure from college, she attempted to work as an entertainer in Japan, following in her mother's footsteps; however, her visa application was denied. As the academic year had already commenced, she was unable to re-enroll at the time.

She is the sister of Filipino television personalities Fifth Solomon and Fourth Solomon.

She was previously married to Nestor Ng in 2013; the couple separated in 2018. An annulment was filed in 2019, but proceedings were delayed for six years due to the COVID-19 pandemic. They have two children, Apollo and Ali. In 2023, she became engaged to her non-showbiz partner, Vince Teotico. They have one child together, Andreas.

== Career ==
Solomon began her career in the Philippine entertainment industry as a contestant on StarStruck: The Next Level (2006), a reality-based talent search aired on GMA Network. Although she did not advance to the Final 14, she subsequently appeared in various television programs produced by GMA Network, most notably in JejeMom (2010), for which she received the Outstanding Supporting Actress in a Gag or Comedy Program award at the 2011 ENPRESS Golden Screen TV Awards. She is also recognized as a recurring cast member on the long-running sketch comedy show Bubble Gang since 2012, and for her role as Janice in the sitcom Pepito Manaloto, which she has portrayed since 2013. In recent years, she has appeared in the Philippine adaptation of Descendants of the Sun (2020) and served as a host in the variety show Tahanang Pinakamasaya (2024).

She has also appeared in several films, including My Bestfriend's Girlfriend (2008), When I Met U (2009), Yesterday, Today, Tomorrow (2011), and My Kontrabida Girl (2012).

== Filmography ==
=== Television ===
| Year | Title | Role | Note(s) |
|---|---|---|---|
| 2006–2007 | StarStruck: The Next Level | Herself | |
| 2007–2012 | Startalk: Struck Attack! | Herself (segment host) | |
| 2007–2008 | Zaido: Pulis Pangkalawakan | Gayke | |
| 2007 | Sine Novela | Marge | Episode: "My Only Love" |
| 2008 | Bubble Gang | Herself | |
| 2008 | Bitoy's Funniest Videos | Herself (segment host) | |
| 2008 | Babangon Ako't Dudurugin Kita | Jadane | |
| 2008 | Codename: Asero | Gigi | |
| 2009 | All About Eve | Jill (special guest role) | |
| 2009 | Adik Sa'Yo | Emilene Santos | |
| 2009–2010 | Full House | Maya | |
| 2010 | Maynila | Cindy | Episode: "Makinig Ka, Puso" |
| 2010 | Diva | Didi | |
| 2010 | Love Bug | Britney | Episode: "Wish Come True" |
| 2010 | JejeMom | Yasmin Villafuerte | |
| 2010 | Beauty Queen | Gracia | |
| 2011 | Pablo S. Gomez's Machete | Candy De Jesus | |
| 2011 | Elena M. Patron's Blusang Itim | Chiqui | |
| 2011 | Andres de Saya | Charing | |
| 2011 | Spooky Nights | Odette | Episode: "Short Time of my Life" |
| 2011 | Pepito Manaloto | | |
| 2012 | Legacy | Candy | |
| 2012 | Spooky Valentine | Nicolette | Episode: "Manikurista" |
| 2012 | Personalan | Herself / Celebrity Uzi | |
| 2012–2013 | Magdalena: Anghel sa Putikan | Roxy | |
| 2012–present | Bubble Gang | Herself | |
| 2012–2019 | iBILIB | Herself (host) | |
| 2013 | Unforgettable | Ruth Natividad | |
| 2013–2018 | Magpakailanman | Anna | Episode: "The Flor Contemplacion Story" |
| 2013–2018 | Magpakailanman | Beverly | Episode: "Jackpot ng Buhay" |
| 2013–present | Pepito Manaloto: Ang Tunay na Kuwento | Janice San Diego Generoso | |
| 2014 | My Destiny | Dang | |
| 2014 | Yagit | Mabel | |
| 2015 | Kailan Ba Tama ang Mali? | Bianca | |
| 2016 | Dear Uge | Haidee | Episode role |
| 2018 | Sirkus | Astra | |
| 2018 | Wowowin | Herself (segment co-host) | |
| 2018 | Lip Sync Battle Philippines | Herself (contestant) | |
| 2018 | Victor Magtanggol | Cynthia | |
| 2019 | Dragon Lady | Christina "Tintin" Mapagmahal | |
| 2020 | Descendants of the Sun | Emma Perez | |
| 2023–2024 | Eat Bulaga! | Herself (host) | |
| 2024 | Tahanang Pinakamasaya! | Herself | |
| 2024 | It's Showtime | Herself (guest judge) | |

=== Film ===
| Year | Title | Role |
|---|---|---|
| 2008 | My Best Friend's Girlfriend | Chicky |
| 2008 | My Monster Mom | Precy |
| 2008 | I.T.A.L.Y. | Charing |
| 2008 | Loving You | Wee's lover |
| 2009 | When I Met U | Kim |
| 2009 | Nobody, Nobody But... Juan | TFC Subscriber |
| 2011 | Yesterday, Today, Tomorrow | Coreen |
| 2012 | My Kontrabida Girl | Charity |
| 2025 | Samahan ng mga Makasalanan | Olive |

== Awards and nominations ==
| Year | Award | Category | Nominated work | Result |
|---|---|---|---|---|
| 2008 | 25th PMPC Star Awards for Movies | New Movie Actress of the Year | My Best Friend's Girlfriend | Nominated |
| 2008 | 6th Golden Screen Awards | Breakthrough Performances | My Best Friend's Girlfriend | Nominated |
| 2011 | Enpress Golden Screen TV Awards | Best Comedy Supporting Actress | JejeMom | Won |
