= Jean Garcia =

Filipino television and film actress (born 1969)

- Born: Jessica Anne Rodriguez Maitim; August 22, 1969 (age 56); Angeles City, Philippines
- Other name: Chic-Chic
- Occupation: Actress
- Years active: 1985–present
- Agent(s): GMA Network (1985-1997, 2006-present); ABS-CBN (1990-2006)
- Children: 2, including Jennica

Jessica Anne Rodriguez Maitim (born August 22, 1969), better known as Jean Garcia (Tagalog: [ˈdʒin gaɾˈsia]), is a Filipino actress. She is known as Madam Claudia Buenavista in the original version of Pangako Sa 'Yo and as Miss Minchin in the 1995 live-action remake of Sarah... Ang Munting Prinsesa.

Garcia is a recipient of a Gawad Urian Award, Golden Screen Award and has received multiple nominations from FAMAS Awards.

== Early life and education ==
Jean Garcia was born on August 22, 1969. She attended Trinity University of Asia (formerly Trinity College of Quezon City) in Quezon City until she was discovered in a noontime show Kalatog Pinggan.

== Career ==
In the drama Pangako Sa 'Yo (2000) she played antagonist Madam Claudia Buenavista. Her next role was in Kay Tagal Kang Hinintay (2002) as Lady Morganna. She also starred in the first musical fantaserye Kampanerang Kuba and the cooking show Makuha Ka sa Tikim. She moved to ABS-CBN's rival network GMA Network, playing villainous roles in primetime shows like Impostora, La Vendetta, Majika and others. She is recently in the said network's newest telefantasya, Dyesebel. Garcia played Abresia in Gagambino.

She was the cover of FHM Philippines' October 2008 issue. Garcia played "Sister Maria Belonia" in Shake, Rattle & Roll X, a Metro Manila Film Festival (MMFF) entry. After Gagambino, she appeared in All About Eve, where she worked with Sunshine Dizon, Iza Calzado, Richard Gomez and Eula Valdez. She later joined the cast of the witchcraft series Ilumina. Garcia recently played the reprising role of Diony in the TV remake of Pinulot Ka Lang sa Lupa, which is based on the 1987 film of the same title released by Regal Entertainment (originally portrayed by Eddie Garcia).

In the same year, she became the antagonist once again in Kambal, Karibal where she played Teresa then in 2018 via Inday Will Always Love You playing the role of Florence as guest appearance and last Ika-5 Utos playing the lead role of Eloisa as protagonist.

== Personal life ==
Garcia has two children.

== Filmography ==
=== Film ===
Year	Title	Role	Note(s)
1988	Lost Command	Donatella "Dona" Banson	
1989	Impaktita	Cita	
1989	Huwag Kang Hahalik sa Diablo	Sandra	
1992	Lucio Margallo	Hermie Margallo	
1993	Lt. Madarang: Iginuhit sa Dugo	Pacita "Chie" Madarang	
1995	P're Hanggang sa Huli	Tammy	
1995	Epifanio ang Bilas Ko: NB-Eye	Emma	
1995	Sarah... Ang Munting Prinsesa	Miss Maria Minchin	
1995	Bawal Na Gamot 2	George	
1996	Anak, Pagsubok Lamang ng Diyos	Kathryn's sister	
1996	Trudis Liit	Clara	
1996	A.E.I.O.U.	Sylvia Numerica	
1996	Aringkingking: Ang Bodyguard Kong Sexy	Leticia	
2000	Kahit Demonyo Itutumba Ko		
2003	Noon at Ngayon: Pagsasamang Kay Ganda	Kathy	
2004	Volta	Kelly Tanjuakio / Celphora	
2004	Mano Po III: My Love	Freida Lee	
2005	Birhen ng Manaoag	Francine	
2005	Say That You Love Me	Mabel	
2006	I Will Always Love You	Adelle Ledesma	
2006	All About Love	Kikay's mom	"Promdi" segment
2007	Happy Hearts	Sarah	
2007	Hide and Seek	Leah Alicanio	
2008	Loving You	Cyrill Sales	
2008	Walang Kawala (No Way Out)	Beng	
2008	Shake, Rattle & Roll X	Sister Maria Belonia	"Class Picture" segment
2009	Ang Darling Kong Aswang	Barang	
2011	Ang Sayaw ng Dalawang Kaliwang Paa	Karen	
2014	Kamkam		
2016	The Escort	Lucy	
2016	Mano Po 7: Chinoy	Deborah "Debbie" Lim-Wong	
2018	The Hows of Us	Baby Silva	
2019	Watch Me Kill	Luciana	
2023	Martyr or Murderer	Leni Robredo	
2025	Kontrabida Academy	Art teacher	

=== Television ===
Year	Title	Role	Notes	Source
1986–1996	That's Entertainment	Herself - Performer		
1989–1997	GMA Supershow	Herself - Co-host		
1989–1990	Student Canteen	Herself - Co-host		
1992–1997	Valiente	Elaine Velasquez-Braganza		
1993	Ipaglaban Mo!	Dorothy	Episode: "Desperado"	
1996–1997	Calvento Files	Various	5 episodes	
1996–1997	Familia Zaragoza	Beatrice Fuentebella		
1997–2001	Wansapanataym	Various	4 episodes	
2000–2002	Pangako Sa 'Yo	Madam Claudia Zalameda-Buenavista		
2002–2003	Kay Tagal Kang Hinintay	Lady Morganna Frost Archangel		
2003–2004	It Might Be You	Orlanda Mae "Ola" Lacuesta		
2005	Pablo S. Gomez's Kampanerang Kuba	Lucia Saavedra-Tennyson		
2005	Makuha Ka sa Tikim	Herself (host)		
2006	Majika	Eloida / Luring		
2006–2007	Atlantika	Reyna Celebes / Celeste		
2007	Mga Kuwento ni Lola Basyang	Aling Tona	Episode: "Ang Parusa ng Dwende"	
2007	Who's Your Daddy Now?	Stephanie		
2007	Impostora	Bettina "Betty" Carreon		
2007–2008	La Vendetta	Amanda Cardinale-Trajano		
2008	Mars Ravelo's Dyesebel	Reyna Lucia Villamayor / Doña Ava Legaspi		
2008–2009	Carlo J. Caparas' Gagambino	Abresia / Divina Marquez Lopez Gutierrez		
2009	All About Eve	Katrina Alegre-Gonzales		
2009	Dear Friend: Karibal	Claire		
2009	Stairway to Heaven	Maita Aragon-Reyes		
2010	Sine Novela: Ina, Kasusuklaman Ba Kita?	Alvina Mendiola-Montenegro		
2010	Diz Iz It!	Herself - Judge		
2010	Ilumina	Elvira Montero Azardon de Salcedo / Melina Montero Azardon de Sebastian		
2011	Alakdana	Teresa San Miguel-Madrigal		
2011–2013	Personalan	Herself (co-host)		
2011	Time of My Life	Lisa Marquez		
2011	Spooky Nights	Chariz's adoptive mother	Episode: "Short Time of My Life"	
2012	Alice Bungisngis and Her Wonder Walis	Esmeralda Reyes		
2012	One True Love	Ellen Balute-Sandoval		
2012	Tweets for My Sweet	Eleanor Marasigan		
2012	Magpakailanman	Nanay Silveria	Episode: "Hinagpis ng Isang Ina"	
2013	Para sa 'Yo ang Laban na Ito	Herself - Co-host		
2013	Kakambal ni Eliana	Isabel Cascavel-Monteverde		
2013–2016	Love Hotline	Herself - Host		
2013–2014	Adarna	Larka / Lupe		
2014–2016	The Half Sisters	Karina "Rina" Mercado-Valdicañas (formerly Alcantara) / Alexa Robbins	418 episodes	
2016	Once Again	Madel Mateo-Evangelista		
2016	Karelasyon	Diane	Episode: "Up and Down"	
2016	Dear Uge	Maria	Episode: "Ms. Fortune Teller"; Credited as "Jean Garcia"	
2017	Pinulot Ka Lang sa Lupa	Diony Sta. Maria-Esquivel		
2017	Dear Uge	Monet	Episode: "Yes! Yes! Sa Feng shui" Credited as "Jean Garcia"	
2017	Dear Uge	Hilda	Episode: "Konting tipid po" Credited as "Jean Garcia"	
2017–2018	Kambal, Karibal	Teresa Abaya-Bautista		
2018	Inday Will Always Love You	Florence Zalameda		
2018	Dear Uge	Marie	Episode: "A Tikoy Love Story"; Credited as "Jean Garcia"	
2018	Dear Uge	Virgie	Episode: "Honor Teacher"; Credited as "Jean Garcia"	
2018–2019	Ika-5 Utos	Eloisa Vallejo-Buenaventura (later Lorenzo)		
2019	Tadhana	Elsa	Episode: "Lundag"; Credited as "Jean Garcia"	
2019–2020	The Gift	Nadia Montes-Toledo / Nadia Montes-Marcelino		
2021	First Yaya	Christine Valdez-Acosta		
2022	First Lady	Christine Valdez-Acosta		
2022; 2025	Lolong	Madam Donatella "Dona" Figueroa vda. de Banson		
2022–2023	Nakarehas na Puso	Amelia Galang / Hilda Cruz		
2023	Maging Sino Ka Man	Belinda Salazar		
2023	Tadhana	Stella	Episode: "Secrets"; Credited as "Jean Garcia"	
2024–2025	Widows' War	Doña Aurora Palacios		
2024	Lilet Matias: Attorney-at-Law	Doña Aurora Palacios		
2025	Magpakailanman	Dra. Jane	Episode: "I Love You Tita"	

== Awards and nominations ==
FAP Awards

- 2006: Best Supporting Actress Nomination for Birhen ng Manaoag

FAMAS Awards

- 2009: Best Supporting Actress Nomination for Walang Kawala
- 2015: Best Actress Nomination for Kamkam
- 2020: Best Actress Nomination for Watch Me Kill

Gawad Urian Awards

- 2012: Best Supporting Actress (Pinakamahusay na Pangalawang Aktres) Winner for Ang Sayaw ng Dalawang Kaliwang Paa
- 2020: Best Actress Nomination for Watch Me Kill

Metro Manila Film Festival

- 1996: Best Supporting Actress Winner for Trudis Liit

Pista ng Pelikulang Pilipino

- 2019: Best Actress Nomination for Watch Me Kill

PMPC Star Awards for Movies:

- 2019: Movie Supporting Actress of the Year Nomination for The Hows of Us

PMPC Star Awards for Television:

- 2002: Best Drama Actress Winner for Pangako sa 'Yo
- 2006: Best Single Performance by an Actress Nomination for Magpakailanman: "Kalbaryo ng Isang Ina"

Golden Screen Awards:

- 2014: Outstanding Performance by an Actress in a Single Drama/Telemovie Program Nomination for Magpakailanman: "Hinagpis ng Isang Ina"
- 2013: Outstanding Supporting Actress in a Drama Series Nomination for One True Love
- 2012: Outstanding Performance by an Actress in a Leading Role (Drama) Winner for Ang Sayaw ng Dalawang Kaliwang Paa
- 2003: Outstanding Supporting Actress in a Drama Series Winner for It Might Be You

Gawad Tanglaw Awards

- 2014: Best Performance by an Actress Winner for Magpakailanman: "Hinagpis ng Isang Ina"

GMA Box Office Group

- 2007: Best Box Office Actress Nomination
