= Sam Y.G. =

Filipino radio and television personality (born 1984)

Sam YG
- Born: Samir Gogna; August 18, 1984 (age 42); Quezon City, Philippines
- Other names: Shivaker; The Original Indian Sensation
- Citizenship: India (until 2010); Philippines (since 2010)
- Education: Ateneo de Manila University
- Occupations: Radio and television personality, TV host
- Years active: 2005–present
- Spouse: Essa Santos (2022)
- Website: https://samyg.com

Samir Gogna (born August 18, 1984), known professionally as Sam YG, and also known as his character Shivaker, is a Filipino radio and television personality. He was one of the three Boys Night Out hosts on Magic 89.9 along with Tony Toni and Slick Rick. He was also a co-host for Eat Bulaga!.

== Early and personal life ==
Gogna was born and raised in the Philippines; he is a fourth-generation Indian Filipino: his family are Catholics originating from Jaipur, India. He has an older brother and a younger sister.

Gogna attended Ateneo de Manila University from grade school to college. Gogna aspired to become a lawyer when he was a teenager, which led him to pursue a degree in legal management.

Gogna became a target of race-based bullying in his youth because he was Indian. His peers called him Bumbáy (Filipino ethnic slur for Indians), 5-6 (Indian loan shark) (Note: Many Indians living in the Philippines are involved in a money-lending scheme where borrowers pay back a ₱5000 loan with ₱1000 interest (total of ₱6000, hence the term "5-6"). The loaned money is paid back within one month, collected on a daily basis. This translates to 20% monthly interest rate) and mabahò (Tagalog for "smelly") based on Filipino stereotypes about Indians.

In April 2010, Gogna gave up his Indian nationality and became a Filipino citizen. He was in a relationship with host Joyce Pring; the pair broke up in 2017, though they have remained friends.

== Career ==
In 2003, 19-year-old Samir Gogna successfully auditioned for the Junior Jock program of Magic 89.9. Being the youngest among the Junior Jocks, his bosses nicknamed him "Young Guy", which he adopted into his radio name, Sam YG (Samir Young Guy).

After graduating from Ateneo de Manila University, Gogna worked with several television networks including Hero, Studio 23's Wazzup Wazzup, QTV, and CNN Philippines.

In 2006, he became a DJ for Magic 89.9. He joined Tony Toni and Slick Rick in Boys' Night Out, taking the place of King DJ Logan. Shivaker, Sam YG's alter ego, first appeared in Boys' Night Out. Shivaker was an Indian love guru who wore a turban and spoke with a thick Indian accent. In 2009, Shivaker had his first television appearance in Cool Center as a relationship expert. In August 2009, Shivaker and Tony Toni appeared as contestants in the Eat Bulaga! segment, "Pinoy Henyo". The studio audience were so fascinated with Shivaker that he was invited to be a host of Eat Bulaga!; he also became a host of Diz Iz It!. In July 2015, he was featured on the cover of Men's Health Philippines. In January 2016, after the last segment Dancing in Tandem replacing ATM with the Baes, Sam YG departed Eat Bulaga! to focus on his career as a DJ.

== Filmography ==
=== Television ===
Year	Title	Role
2009–2010	Cool Center	Himself/Co-host
2009–2016	Eat Bulaga!	Himself/Co-host
2010	Diz Iz It!	Himself/Co-host
2011	Midnight DJ	Bumbay
2014–2015; 2015–2024	Boys Ride Out/Boys Off the Record	Himself/Host
2016	Dear Uge	Rajesh
2016	Vintage Trip	Himself/Host
2018	Road Trip	Himself/Guest

== Radio ==
- Sam vs. Sam (2005–06, with Sam Oh)
- Boys Night Out (2006–2023)

== Notes and references ==
Notes
