= Makuha Ka sa Tikim =

- Genre: Cooking, reality
- Presented by: Jean Garcia; Eugene Domingo; Cherry Pie Picache; Eula Valdez
- Country of origin: Philippines
- Original language: Filipino
- No. of seasons: 2
- No. of episodes: 50

Production
- Running time: 35 minutes
- Production companies: ABS-CBN Studios; Unilever Philippines

Original release
- Network: ABS-CBN
- Release: September 10, 2005 – November 24, 2006

Makuha Ka sa Tikim (English: be taken with the taste) is a Philippine television cooking show broadcast by ABS-CBN. Originally hosted by Eula Valdez, Jean Garcia and Cherry Pie Picache. It aired from September 10, 2005 to November 24, 2006, replacing Fruit Basket. Valdez, Garcia and Eugene Domingo serve as the final hosts. Hundreds applied for the show but only 27 were selected.

== Hosts ==
- Cherry Pie Picache
- Eugene Domingo
- Eula Valdez

== Notes ==
- Eugene Domingo replaced Jean Garcia as a host when she decided to move to GMA Network.

== Former host ==
- Jean Garcia (removed from the show due to GMA Network exclusive contract)
