= Cool Center =

Philippine television talk show

- Title card
- Genre: Comedy; Talk show
- Presented by: Eugene Domingo; Anjo Yllana
- Country of origin: Philippines
- Original language: Tagalog
- No. of episodes: 55

Production
- Camera setup: Multiple-camera setup
- Running time: 60–75 minutes
- Production company: GMA Entertainment TV

Original release
- Network: GMA Network
- Release: March 14, 2009 – April 17, 2010

Cool Center is a Philippine television comedy talk show broadcast by GMA Network. Hosted by Eugene Domingo and Anjo Yllana, it premiered on March 14, 2009. The show concluded on April 17, 2010, with a total of 55 episodes.

== Hosts ==
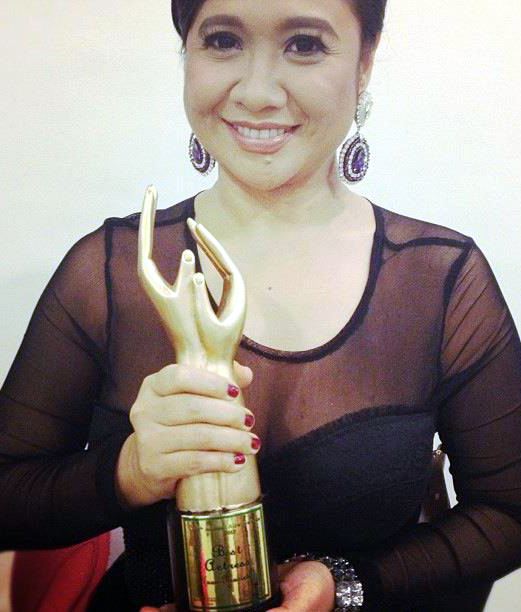
Eugene Domingo served as a host.

- Eugene Domingo
- Anjo Yllana
- BB Gandanghari
- Arf Arf
- Sam Y.G. as Shivaker
- Ely Cruz Ramirez as Mr. Cariñoso

== Ratings ==
According to AGB Nielsen Philippines' Mega Manila household television ratings, the pilot episode of Cool Center earned a 13.9% rating. The final episode scored a 6.5 rating.

== Accolades ==
Accolades received by Cool Center
Year	Award	Category	Recipient	Result	Ref.
2010	24th PMPC Star Awards for Television	Best Variety/Game Show	Cool Center	Nominated	
