= Legal management (academic discipline) =

Academic discipline on law and management

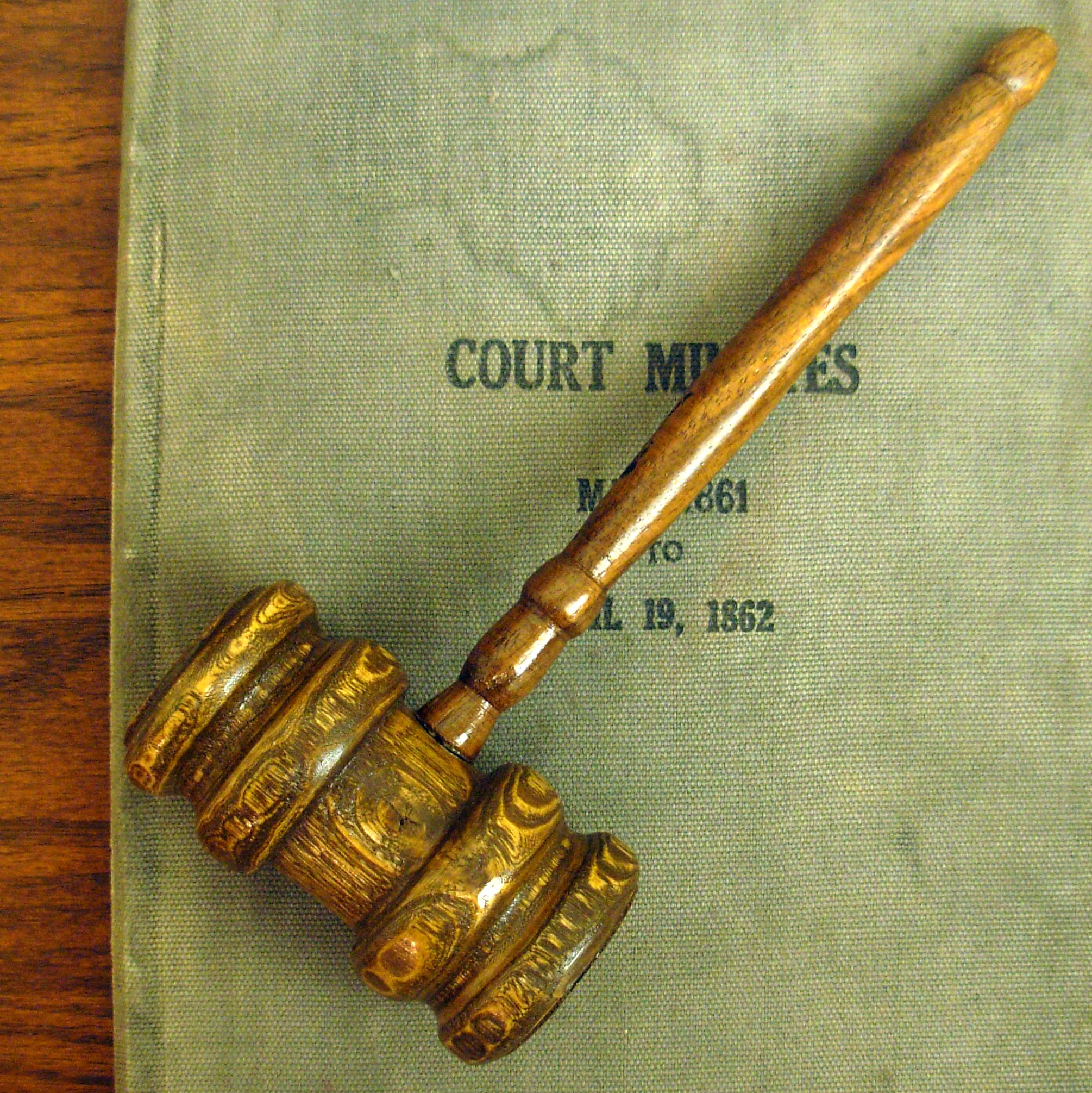

Legal management or paralegal studies is an academic, vocational, and professional discipline that is a hybrid between the study of law and management (i.e., business administration, public administration, etc.). Often, alumni of legal management programmes pursue a professional degree in law such as Juris Doctor (JD) or Bachelor of Laws (LL.B.) while some profess as paralegals, law clerks, political analysts, politicians, public administrators, entrepreneurs, business executives, or pursue careers in academia.

The degree was designed in the Philippines and was first introduced in Ateneo de Manila University in the 1980s by former Philippine Supreme Court Chief Justice Renato Corona. A similar degree known as Legal Studies is offered at the University of California Berkeley, but without management courses.

Legal management student organisations across the Philippines are represented by the Alliance of Legal Management Associations of the Philippines (ALMAP) to the Securities and Exchange Commission, as a non-stock, non-profit, student-run corporation.

== Curriculum ==
Legal management is currently offered in multiple degree formats depending on the offering college or university. Its variety and flexibility is a focal point among schools that have it in their roster of academic degrees. Some capitalise in the legal aspects, while others for the business aspects. Some schools may offer the degree either as a predominantly preparatory law programme, a liberal arts focused programme, or a business and management programme. Core subjects include: law, philosophy, literature and management (public and business). Depending on the school, the ratio of law courses to management courses vary between 40:60 to 90:10.

Variations of the discipline can be conferred either as the following undergraduate degrees:

- Bachelor of Science in Legal Management (BSc Legal Management)
- Bachelor of Arts in Legal Management (AB Legal Management)
- Bachelor of Arts in Legal Studies (AB Legal Studies)
- Bachelor of Arts in Paralegal Studies (AB Paralegal Studies)
- Bachelor of Science in business administration major in Legal Management (BSc BA Legal Management)
- Bachelor of Science in Management major in Legal Management (BSc Management – Legal Management)

=== Courses ===
Legal management alumni are highly trained, adept, and knowledgeable in the following gamut of disciplines:

Liberal Arts	Law	Business
Anthropology; Communication Arts; Governance and Public Administration; History; Literature; Philosophy; Psychology; Political Economy; Political Science; Public Policy; Sociology	Administrative Law; Civil Law; Constitutional Law; Criminal Law; Labour Law; Legal and Judicial Ethics; Legal Writing and Statutory Construction; Mercantile Law; Remedial Law; Taxation Law; Political Law; Public International Law	Accounting; Business Mathematics; Business Communication; Corporate Social Responsibility; Economics; Finance; Marketing; Human Resource Management; Statistics; Organisational Behaviour; Operations Management; Public Relations; Strategic Management; Taxation; Total Quality Management

== Alliance of Legal Management Associations of the Philippines ==
Founded in 2000, the Alliance of Legal Management Associations of the Philippines (ALMAP, Inc.) is the home of all Legal Management Student Organisations in the Philippines. It is responsible for the promotion of all Legal Management Degree Programs in the country, and is the sole and exclusive representative of the Legal Management Student Body in the Commission on Higher Education (CHED) and it is duly registered with the Securities and Exchange Commission as a Non-Stock, Non-Profit Student Organisation.

It fosters relationships between different schools offering the Legal Management, Legal Studies, Paralegal Studies, and the like degree programs through social engineering projects, forums, academic seminars, project partnerships and nation-building initiatives.

=== Members ===
- Ateneo de Naga University – Legal Management Institute of Ateneo De Naga Students
- Bulacan State University – Legal Management Society
- Cagayan State University, Andrews Campus – Association of Legal Management Students
- Colegio de San Juan de Letran – Letran Legal Management Society
- De La Salle Lipa – La Sallian Jurists
- De La Salle University Manila – Ley La Salle
- Far Eastern University Manila – Negotiorum Lex
- Holy Angel University – Juris Orbis
- Isabela State University – Ordo Justinianist
- Jose Rizal University – JRU Legal Management Organization
- Lyceum of the Philippines University Batangas – Paralegal Society
- Lyceum of the Philippines University Cavite – Legal Studies Society
- Lyceum of the Philippines University Manila – Legal Studies Society
- New Era University – Legal Management Organization
- San Beda College Alabang – Junior Bedan Law Circle Alabang
- San Beda University Manila – Junior Bedan Law Circle Manila
- San Sebastian College – Recoletos de Manila – Legal Management Society
- University of Saint Louis Tuguegarao – Sociedad de Lex Manus
- University of the East Manila – Lex Societas Orientis
- University of Batangas, Main Campus – Association of Legal Management Majors (ALMMA)w
- University of Batangas, Lipa City – Gens Animus Vox Vocis Excellencia Liberum (GAVEL)
- University of Mindanao – LEXIUM League of Legal Management Students
- University of Santo Tomas – Legal Management Society

=== National presidents ===
- Timothy S. Caday (University of the East Manila) – 2017–present
- Rhandel Colleen B. Guimbal (Far Eastern University) – 2016–2016
- Eric Vincent G. Yumul (Holy Angel University) – 2015–2016
- Migel S. Demdam (San Beda College) – 2014–2015
- Ginalynn Marriel A. De Torres (University of Santo Tomas) – 2013–2014
- Rhandelle August M. Mabunga (University of Santo Tomas) – 2013
- Nester Mendoza (University of Santo Tomas) – 2012
- Rhodel Ishiwata Sazon (University of Santo Tomas) – 2011–2012

Note: Incomplete List

== Notable alumni ==
- Diosdado Macapagal Arroyo (Ateneo de Naga University) '97 – Member of the House of Representatives of the Philippines, Son of Philippine President Gloria Macapagal Arroyo and grandson of Philippine President Diosdado Macapagal.
- Andres Bautista (Ateneo de Manila University) '90 – Former chairman of the Philippine Commission on Elections. President of the Harvard Law School Student Council and Harvard Club of the Philippines.
- Antonette C. Tionko (Ateneo de Manila University) – Partner, Sycip Gorres Velayo & Co. (Ernst & Young).
- Camille Maria L. Castolo (Ateneo de Manila University) '10 Class Valedictorian – The Legal 500 Lawyer, SyCip Salazar Hernandez & Gatmaitan Law.
- Enrique V. dela Cruz, Jr. (University of Santo Tomas) '96 – Provincial Board Member, Provincial Government of Bulacan. John F. Kennedy School of Government of Harvard University Alumni, University of London Alumni, Fulbright and British Council scholar.
- Gerardo Domenico Lanuza (De La Salle University) '06 – Director, Philippine Realty and Holdings Corporation & Vice President, Campos, Lanuza & Co., Inc.
- Jorge Alfonso C. Melo (Ateneo de Manila University) – Former editor-in-chief, Ateneo Law Journal.
- Dr Marcial Orlando A. Balgos (Ateneo de Manila University) – Professor, Ateneo Graduate School of Business.
- Nielson Pangan (New Era University) '10 – 2014 Philippine Bar Exam Topnotcher.
- Rasmon Tuazon (University of Santo Tomas) '03 – Carlos Palanca Memorial Awards for Literature Laureate and UST Rector's Literary Awardee.
- Sam Y.G. (a.k.a. Samir Gogna) (Ateneo De Manila University) '05 – Actor, Host, and Comedian.
- Teodoro Kalaw IV (Ateneo de Manila University) – Harvard Law School Ll.M. Alumni, University of Cambridge Master of Studies in Sustainability Leadership Alumni, Kellogg School of Management & Hong Kong University of Science and Technology MBA Alumni, University of the Philippines MPA Alumni, president of the Philippine Institute of Arbitrators, and professor of law and public administration at the University of the Philippines and at the Ateneo De Manila University.
- Jun Mark G. Sison, MBA, AMP (Far Eastern University) – Executive Director - Wells Fargo Philippines (2016 - present), Founder - FEU Negotiorum Lex (Legal Management Society) 1999, President - College “Y” Club FEU and National Treasurer of YMCA Manila College Club 1999-2000, Vice President - Institute of Accounts, Business and Finance (IABF) FEU Student Council 2000-2001, MBA Far Eastern University ’06, Doctor of Education (Earned Units ‘2008-2010), Member Board of Trustees - IABF Alumni Foundation FEU ‘2022 - present, 1st to be an AMP (Accredited Mortgage Professional) in the Philippines by the US Mortgage Banking Association (2017).

== See also ==
- Pre law
- Legal Education
- Bachelor of Laws
- Juris Doctor
- List of academic disciplines
- Political Science
- Paralegal
