= Las Hermanas (TV series) =

Philippine television drama series

- Title card
- Genre: Drama
- Written by: Geng Delgado; Briylle Tabora; Nehemiarey Dallego
- Directed by: Monti Puno Parungao
- Creative director: Aloy Adlawan
- Starring: Yasmien Kurdi; Thea Tolentino; Faith da Silva
- Theme music composer: Ann Margaret R. Figueroa
- Opening theme: "Hawak Kita" by Jennie Gabriel
- Country of origin: Philippines
- Original language: Tagalog
- No. of episodes: 60

Production
- Executive producer: Erwin Manzano Hilado
- Cinematography: Mark Ginolos
- Editors: Ver Custodio; Noel Stamatelaky Mauricio II
- Camera setup: Multiple-camera setup
- Running time: 21–29 minutes
- Production company: GMA Entertainment Group

Original release
- Network: GMA Network
- Release: October 25, 2021 – January 14, 2022

Las Hermanas (transl. the sisters) is a Philippine television drama series broadcast by GMA Network. Directed by Monti Puno Parungao, it stars Yasmien Kurdi, Thea Tolentino and Faith da Silva all in the title roles. It premiered on October 25, 2021 on the network's Afternoon Prime line up. The series concluded on January 14, 2022, with a total of 60 episodes.

The series is streaming online on YouTube.

== Cast and characters ==
Cast

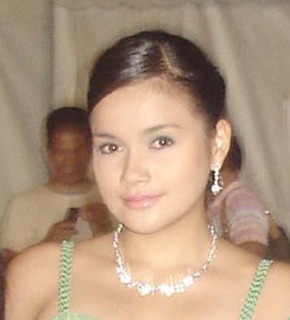
Yasmien Kurdi

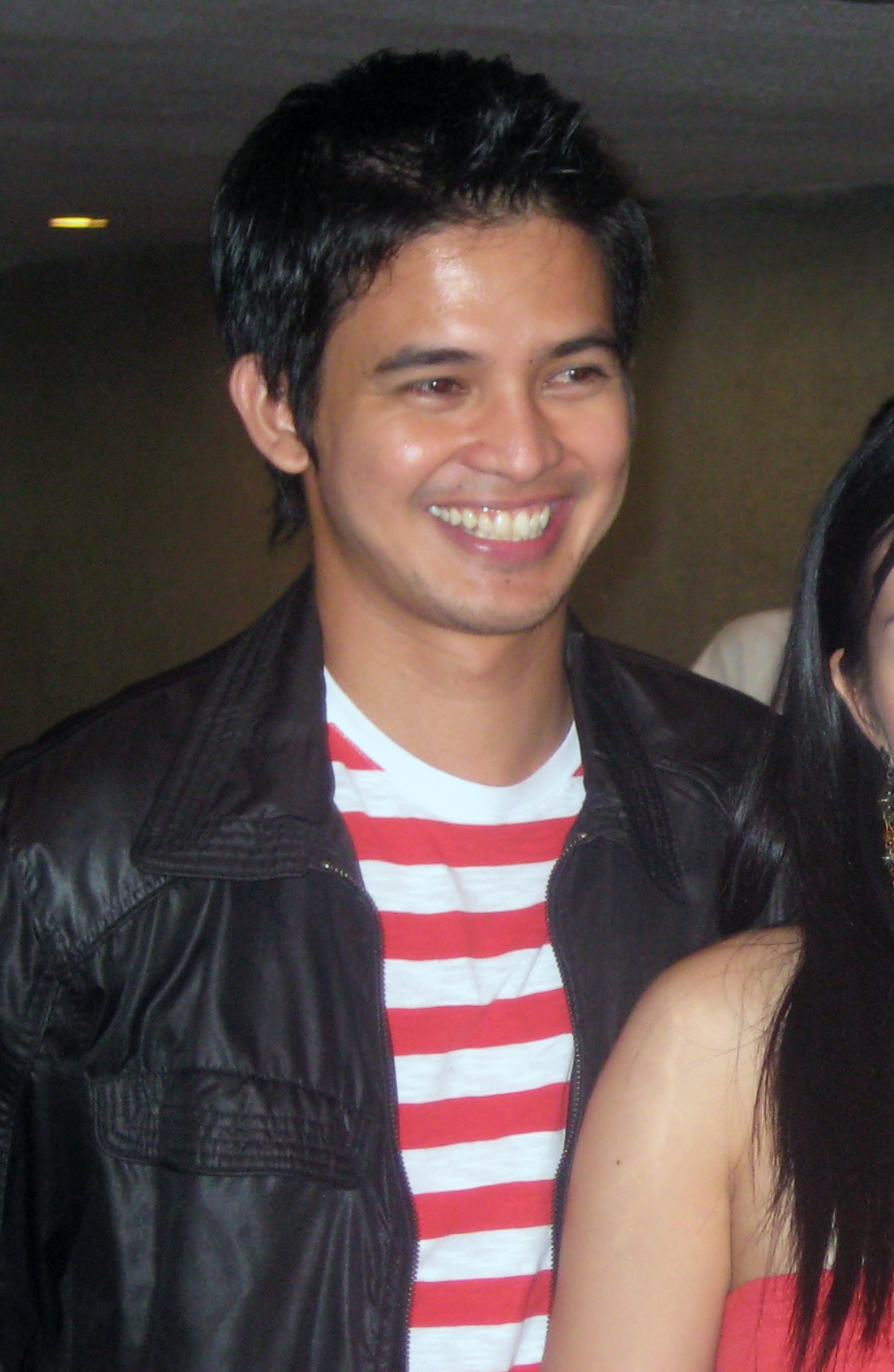
Jason Abalos

Lead cast

- Yasmien Kurdi as Dorothy Manansala
- Thea Tolentino as Minerva "Minnie" Manansala
- Faith da Silva as Scarlet Manansala / Carla Illustre

Supporting cast

- Albert Martinez as Lorenzo Illustre
- Jason Abalos as Gabriel Lucero
- Lucho Ayala as Ronald de Guzman
- Jennica Garcia as Brenda Macario-Lucero
- Madeleine Nicolas as Josefa Manansala
- Rubi Rubi as Rowena Mallari / Ellen "Lady E" Torillo
- Melissa Mendez as Divine Sarmiento
- Robert Ortega as Berto Macario
- Paolo Serrano as Gerald Kau
- Orlando Sol as Franco Francisco
- Coleen Paz as Kiwi Almeda

Guest cast

- Rita Avila as Mildred Manansala
- Leandro Baldemor as Fernando Manansala
- Gabrielle Hahn as Kaye

== Production ==
Principal photography commenced in May 2021.

== Ratings ==
According to AGB Nielsen Philippines' Nationwide Urban Television Audience Measurement People in television homes, the pilot episode of Las Hermanas earned a 6.1% rating. The final episode scored a 5.3% rating.
