= Jennica Garcia =

Filipino actress and host

- Born: Jennica Alexis Maitim Garcia; Quezon City, Philippines
- Other name: Jen
- Occupations: Actress; host
- Years active: 2006–present
- Agents: Sparkle (2007–2014; 2019–2022); Star Magic (2023–present)
- Spouse: Alwyn Uytingco (m. 2014; sep. 2020)
- Children: 2
- Parents: Jigo Garcia (father); Jean Garcia (mother)

Jennica Alexis Maitim Garcia (Tagalog: [ˌd͡ʒɛːnɪˈxɐ ɣɐɾˈsiɐ]) is a Filipino actress, host and director. She is the daughter of veteran actress, Jean Garcia. She is currently a freelance artist.

== Early life and background ==
Garcia was born in Quezon City, Philippines. Raised in a prominent entertainment family, her early life and non-traditional educational path were heavily shaped by her family's background and her early entry into show business.

== Acting career ==
=== Career Beginnings and Early Success (2006–2014) ===
Garcia began her career in 2006 under GMA Network’s talent management arm, Sparkle. She made her television debut in the 2007 drama series Impostora and quickly gained traction, landing her breakout film role in the horror movie Hide and Seek that same year. For the next several years, she became a staple of GMA’s primetime and afternoon blocks, starring in series such as Ina, Kasusuklaman Ba Kita?, Bantatay, and My Beloved.

=== Hiatus and Showbiz Comeback (2014–2022) ===
Following her marriage to actor Alwyn Uytingco in 2014, Garcia stepped back from the limelight to focus on her family and raise her two children. While she made sporadic television appearances on various networks—including roles in ABS-CBN's Nang Ngumiti ang Langit (2019) and GMA's Las Hermanas (2021–2022)—she remained largely away from heavy full-time acting commitments.

=== The Grand Resurgence and Critical Acclaim (2023–Present) ===
In 2023, Garcia officially signed with ABS-CBN's Star Magic and experienced a massive career revival.

Her portrayal of the fierce, loyal, and fan-favorite character Lailani "Lala" Millado in the acclaimed revenge-drama series Dirty Linen (2023) re-established her as a powerhouse actress. This performance won her the Best Primetime Supporting Actress trophy at the 2024 Platinum Stallion Media Awards.

Capitalizing on her resurgence, she expanded into hosting, serving as a co-host on variety and reality programs like It's Your Lucky Day.

Garcia reached new professional heights in film. She starred as Geleen in the indie movie Sunshine (2024), a performance that won her the prestigious Best Supporting Actress award at the 49th Gawad Urian Awards in October 2026. Additionally, she joined the cast of the smash-hit movie Hello, Love, Again (2024) and starred in The Delivery Rider (2025).

She continues her dramatic streak as Sarah Banaag, an abusive mother, in the 2024–2025 prime-time drama series Saving Grace.

== Other ventures ==
=== Professional Skincare & Esthetics ===
Garcia leveled up her passion for wellness by officially graduating from esthetician school. This formal education deepened her understanding of cellular skin health, which directly paved the way for her commercial venture as the brand ambassador and face of the well-known wellness and skin clinic Bioessence.

=== Maternal Advocacy & Consultations ===
As a passionate advocate for natural parenting, Garcia founded Kalinga Ni Nanay, an online community dedicated to earth-loving and eco-conscious mothers. Through this advocacy, she offers her expertise as a Certified Natural Infant Hygiene Consultant, helping parents navigate natural, eco-friendly child-rearing methods.

=== Artisan Crafting & Storytelling ===
Expressing her creative side beyond the screen, Garcia has worked as a Maker of Organic Heirloom Dolls. She handcrafts natural, organic toys for children. Additionally, she uses her platform as a self-described Healing Storyteller to share mindful, faith-driven, and therapeutic narratives with families.

=== Social Responsibility & Educational Outreach ===
Garcia is actively involved with the non-governmental and social responsibility arm of Cascades School called Cascades Philippines. Alongside her daughters, she launched the "Kids and Ideas Project"—a non-profit outreach project aimed at building student-led community programs like community pantries and educational support for underprivileged areas.

== Acting credits ==
=== Film ===
Key
| † | Denotes films that have not yet been released |

Jennica Garcia's film credits with year of release, film titles and roles
| Year | Title | Role | Ref. |
|---|---|---|---|
| 2007 | Hide and Seek | Nica Aliciano | |
| 2008 | One True Love | Raya | |
| 2008 | Shake, Rattle & Roll X | Kaysee | |
| 2009 | Shake, Rattle & Roll XI | Sheila | |
| 2023 | Ma'am Chief: Shakedown in Seoul | Police Chief Msgt. Joy Salazar | |
| 2024 | Sunshine | Geleen | |
| 2024 | Hello, Love, Again | Baby | |
| 2025 | Postmortem | Kath | |
| 2025 | My Love Will Make You Disappear | Ella Gonzales | |
| 2025 | The Delivery Rider | Nichelle | |
| 2025 | Sisa | Leonor | |

=== Television ===
Key
| † | Denotes shows that have not yet been aired |

Jennica Garcia's television credits with year of release, title(s) and role
| Year | Title | Role | Ref. |
|---|---|---|---|
| 2007 | Impostora | Karen Manansala | |
| 2007–2008 | Boys Nxt Door | Summer/Winter | |
| 2007–2008 | Sine Novela: Pasan Ko ang Daigdig | Janet | |
| 2008 | Babangon Ako't Dudurugin Kita | teen Julie Maceda-San Juan | |
| 2008 | Ako si Kim Samsoon | Eliza Buot | |
| 2008–2009 | Gagambino | Gelay Lopez Bayani | |
| 2009 | Adik Sa'Yo | Karen Maglipot | |
| 2009 | Eat Bulaga! | Herself / Guest Performer | |
| 2010 | Sine Novela: Ina, Kasusuklaman Ba Kita? | Rizzi Mendiola Bustamante | |
| 2010 | Dear Friend: My Stalking Heart | Doris Degampat/Dora | |
| 2010 | JejeMom | Lovely Dela Cruz / Pamela Jones | |
| 2010–2011 | Bantatay | Joanna | |
| 2010 | Puso ng Pasko: Artista Challenge | Herself with Carl Guevarra / Red Team Challenger | |
| 2011 | Captain Barbell: Ang Pagbabalik | Linda / Aswang | |
| 2012 | My Beloved | Monica Quijano | |
| 2012 | Kasalanan Bang Ibigin Ka? | Bianca Santiago | |
| 2013 | Bukod Kang Pinagpala | Ofelia "Ofe" Almazan-Alfonso | |
| 2014 | Magpakailanman: Pabrika ng Bata | Young Agnes | |
| 2014 | Carmela | Aaliyah Hernando | |
| 2014 | Ipaglaban Mo: Pagkilala ng Ama | Ana | |
| 2014 | Wattpad Presents: DyepNi | Nialla | |
| 2016–2017 | Magpahanggang Wakas | Angel Faustino | |
| 2017 | Ipaglaban Mo: Katotohanan | Nery | |
| 2017 | Wildflower | Young Emilia Ardiente | |
| 2017 | Eat Bulaga! Lenten Special: Pagpapatawad | Catherine | |
| 2017 | Ipaglaban Mo: Pasada | Lorna | |
| 2019 | Tadhana: Sanib | Ofelia | |
| 2019 | Nang Ngumiti ang Langit | Young Leticia | |
| 2019 | Maalaala Mo Kaya: Jacket | Cathy | |
| 2019 | Inay Ko Po | Host | |
| 2019 | Eat Bulaga! Lenten Special: Byaheng Broken | Rita | |
| 2019 | APT Entertainment Lenten Presentation: "The Journey" | Cely | |
| 2021 | Tadhana: Sekyu in the City | Cathy | |
| 2021–2022 | Las Hermanas | Brenda Macario | |
| 2023 | Dirty Linen | Lailani "Lala" Millado | |
| 2023 | Fractured | Mira | |
| 2023 | Ur Da Boss | Herself / Special Assistant | |
| 2023 | It's Your Lucky Day | Herself / Co-host | |
| 2023–present | ASAP XP | Herself / Performer | |
| 2024 | TV Patrol | Guest Star Patroller | |
| 2024 | Tadhana: Family Secrets | Milette | |
| 2024–2025 | Saving Grace | Sarah Banaag | |
| 2025 | Maalaala Mo Kaya: Trumpo | Malou | |
| 2025 | Tadhana: Boss Yaya | Carla | |
| 2025 | Eat Bulaga! | Herself / Guest Performer | |
| 2025 | Rainbow Rumble | Herself / Contestant | |
| 2025–2026 | What Lies Beneath | Dolores Santiago | |
| 2026 | Tadhana: Tunay na Misis Solis | Aida | |
| 2026 | Magpakailanman: My Father Vlogger: The Dondon Havana Story | Mavic | |
| 2026 | Sigabo | Young Betchay Cabagsik | |

== Accolades ==
Awards and nominations received by Jennica Garcia
| Year (Note: Indicates the year of ceremony. Each year is linked to the article about the awards held that year, wherever possible.) | Award (Note: Awards, festivals, honors and other miscellaneous organizations are listed in alphabetical order.) | Category | Nominated work | Result | Ref. |
|---|---|---|---|---|---|
| 2024 | Platinum Stallion Media Awards | Best Primetime Supporting Actress | Dirty Linen | Won | |
| 2026 | Gawad Urian | Best Supporting Actress | Sunshine | Won | |
