= Hide and Seek (2007 film) =

Hide & Seek
- Directed by: Rahyan Carlos
- Written by: Gina Marissa Tagasa
- Produced by: Roselle Monteverde-Teo; Lily Monteverde
- Starring: Eric Quizon; Jean Garcia; Alessandra de Rossi; Ryan Eigenmann; Valeen Montenegro; Jennica Garcia; Mart Escudero
- Cinematography: Eli Balce; Luis Quirino
- Edited by: C.J. Piol
- Music by: Von de Guzman
- Production companies: Regal Entertainment; Regal Multimedia, Inc.
- Release date: October 31, 2007
- Country: Philippines
- Languages: Filipino; English

Hide & Seek is a 2007 Philippine horror film directed by Rahyan Carlos. It stars Eric Quizon, Jean Garcia, Alessandra de Rossi and Ryan Eigenmann. The film depicts a family moving to an abandoned house and discovers supernatural spirits while the little boy plays hide and seek.

== Plot ==
Oliver Aliciano, a college professor, leaves Manila with his wife Leah, his rebellious stepdaughter Nica and her young brother Uno after he is blamed for the death of Ella Cabuena, Nica's best friend. After moving to an abandoned house to stay, they are troubled by ominous visions and hauntings.

At first they ignore the strange apparitions. Later, they find out the real story of the house. Before, a rich family lived there and the husband had an affair with the maid, Dolor. Dolor's husband Gener gets jealous and suspects that their daughter and her upcoming baby is not his. Gener confronted Dolor as she also admitted that he had nothing to suspect because their daughter is his, but Gener ignores her and accidentally kills her daughter and Dolor along with her unborn baby. Gener was killed when the police tried to arrest him. After hearing the story, Oliver and Leah find ways to stop the haunting but later they realize that the ghost of Dolor and her daughter only wants to help them and the ghost of Gener wants them killed like what he did to his family.

The ghost of Gener possesses Oliver and made him attack every member of his family but because of the help of Dolor and her daughter, they stop the ghost of Gener and free Oliver. They leave the house to start a new life back in the city while Oliver is also acquitted from the murder and bonds with his step daughter.

== Cast ==
- Eric Quizon as Oliver Aliciano
- Jean Garcia as Leah Aliciano
- Alessandra de Rossi as Dolor Buntag
- Ryan Eigenmann as Gener Buntag
- Mart Escudero as Joseph Dionisio
- Jennica Garcia as Nica Aliciano
- Valeen Montenegro as Ella Cabuena
- Rubirubi as Andeng
- Angel Sy as Tala Buntag
- Julijo Pisk as Uno Aliciano

== See also ==
- List of ghost films
