= JejeMom =

2010 Philippine television sitcom series

- Title card
- Genre: Sitcom
- Directed by: Dominic Zapata
- Starring: Eugene Domingo
- Country of origin: Philippines
- Original language: Tagalog
- No. of episodes: 14

Production
- Executive producer: Joseph T. Aleta
- Camera setup: Multiple-camera setup
- Running time: 30–45 minutes
- Production company: GMA Entertainment TV

Original release
- Network: GMA Network
- Release: August 14 – November 13, 2010

JejeMom is a 2010 Philippine television sitcom series broadcast by GMA Network. Directed by Dominic Zapata, it stars Eugene Domingo in the title role. It premiered on August 14, 2010. The series concluded on November 13, 2010, with a total of 14 episodes.

The series is streaming online on YouTube.

== Cast and characters ==
Cast

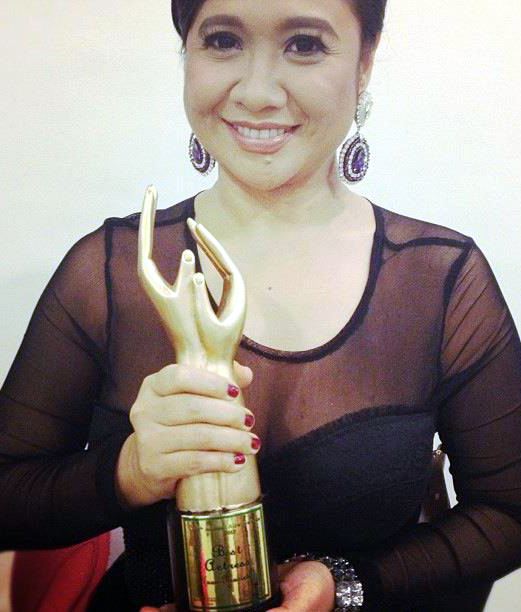
Eugene Domingo

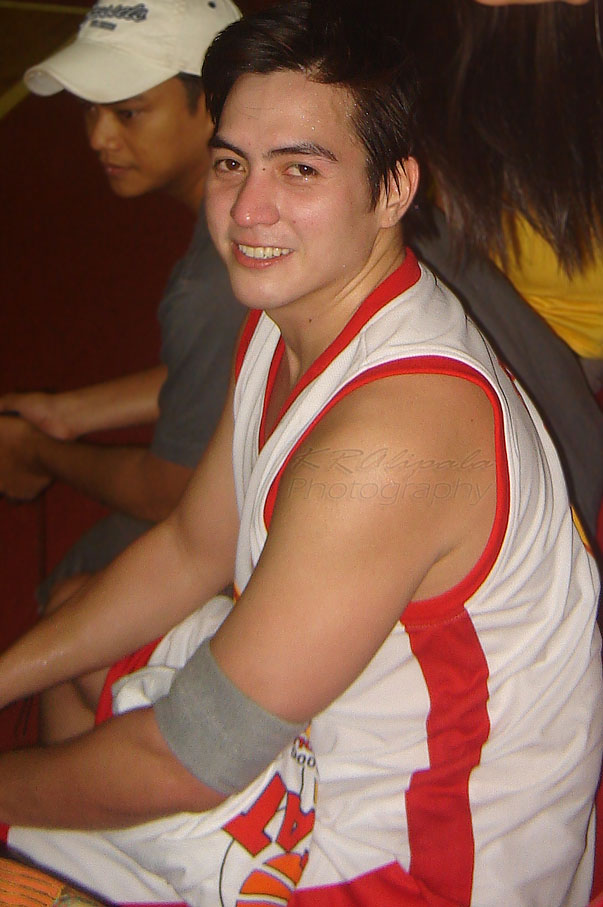
Wendell Ramos

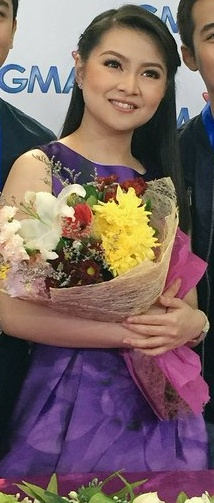
Barbie Forteza

Lead cast

- Eugene Domingo as Gigi dela Cruz / Stephanie Jones

Supporting cast

- Jennica Garcia as Lovely dela Cruz / Pamela Jones
- Chariz Solomon as Yasmin Villafuerte
- Wendell Ramos as Dindo Arañes / Dindo Jones
- Robert "Buboy" Villar as G-Boy dela Cruz / Sander Jones
- Gelli de Belen as Bunny Wilson
- Ricky Davao as Winston Wilson / Lady Gangstah
- Carl Guevarra as Jhong Jilaro
- Bayani Agbayani as Hepe D. Marangya
- Barbie Forteza as Angelene "Angel" Arevalo
- Sandy Talag as Tweety Wilson

== Ratings ==
According to AGB Nielsen Philippines' Mega Manila People/Individual television ratings, the pilot episode of JejeMom earned a 9% rating. The final episode scored an 8% rating.

== Accolades ==
Accolades received by JejeMom
Year	Award	Category	Recipient	Result	Ref.
2011	8th Golden Screen TV Awards	Outstanding Comedy Program	JejeMom	Nominated	
2011	8th Golden Screen TV Awards	Outstanding Performance by an Actress in a Gag or Comedy Program	Eugene Domingo	Nominated	
2011	8th Golden Screen TV Awards	Outstanding Supporting Actor in a Gag or Comedy Program	Ricky Davao	Nominated	
2011	8th Golden Screen TV Awards	Outstanding Supporting Actress in a Gag or Comedy Program	Chariz Solomon	Won	
