= Ina, Kasusuklaman Ba Kita? =

2010 Philippine television drama series

- Title card
- Also known as: A Mother's Sacrifice
- Genre: Drama
- Based on: Ina, Kasusuklaman Ba Kita? (1985) by Pio De Castro III
- Directed by: Gil Tejada Jr.
- Starring: Jean Garcia; Jennica Garcia
- Theme music composer: Alfonso Bolipata
- Opening theme: "Ina, Kasusuklaman Ba Kita?"
- Country of origin: Philippines
- Original language: Tagalog
- No. of episodes: 82

Production
- Executive producers: Camille Montaño; Kaye Atienza-Cadsawan
- Camera setup: Multiple-camera setup
- Running time: 30–45 minutes
- Production company: GMA Entertainment TV

Original release
- Network: GMA Network
- Release: January 25 – May 21, 2010

Ina, Kasusuklaman Ba Kita? (transl. mom, will I loathe you? / international title: A Mother's Sacrifice) is a 2010 Philippine television drama series broadcast by GMA Network. Based on a 1985 Philippine film of the same title, the series is the eighteenth installment of Sine Novela. Directed by Gil Tejada Jr., it stars Jean Garcia and Jennica Garcia. It premiered on January 25, 2010 on the network's Dramarama sa Hapon line up. The series concluded on May 21, 2010, with a total of 82 episodes.

== Cast and characters ==
Cast

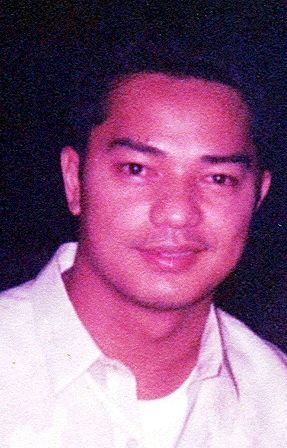
Ariel Rivera

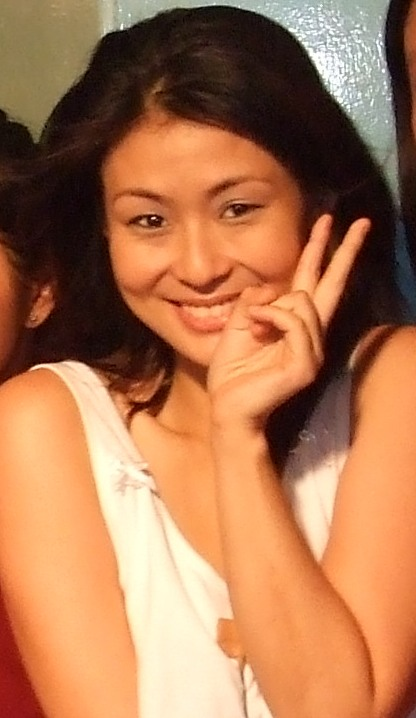
Iwa Moto

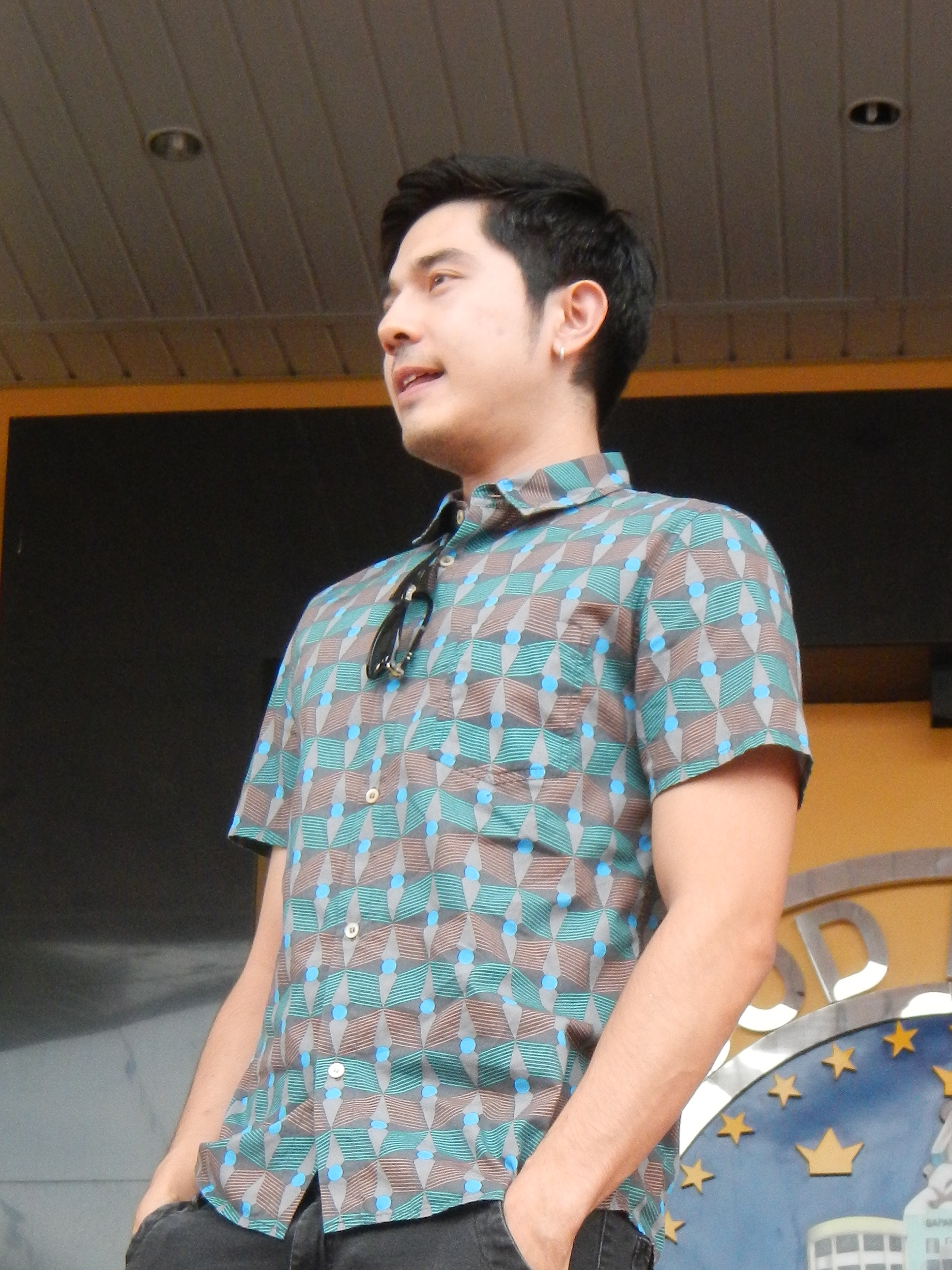
Paulo Avelino

Lead cast

- Jean Garcia as Alvina Mendiola-Montenegro
- Jennica Garcia as Rizzi M. Bustamante

Supporting cast

- Ariel Rivera as Daniel Bustamante
- Iwa Moto as Rossan M. Ortega
- Dion Ignacio as Rav M. Asuncion
- Karla Estrada as Cora Evangelista
- Paulo Avelino as Cito Valera
- Luis Alandy as Brent Carlos
- Lloyd Samartino as Arnel Ortega
- LJ Reyes as Katrina Evangelista
- Regine Tolentino as Gina
- Richard Quan as Monching
- Dang Cruz as Bebang

Guest cast

- Renz Valerio as Rav
- Ella Cruz as Rossan
- Sandy Talag as Rizzi
- Sabrina Man as Katrina
- Gerard Pizarras as Benjie
- Toby Alejar as Ted Asuncion
- Caridad Sanchez as Susing Mendiola
- Eunice Lagusad as Nova

== Ratings ==
According to AGB Nielsen Philippines' Mega Manila household television ratings, the pilot episode of Ina, Kasusuklaman Ba Kita? earned a 17.9% rating. The final episode scored a 14.6% rating.
