= Wachamakulit =

2010 Philippine television game show

- Title card
- Genre: Game show
- Directed by: Joyce Bernal
- Presented by: Eugene Domingo
- Country of origin: Philippines
- Original language: Tagalog
- No. of episodes: 24

Production
- Executive producer: Wilma Galvante
- Camera setup: Multiple-camera setup
- Running time: 30 minutes
- Production company: GMA Entertainment TV

Original release
- Network: GMA Network
- Release: April 16 – September 24, 2010

Wachamakulit is a 2010 Philippine television game show broadcast by GMA Network. Directed by Joyce Bernal, it hosted by Eugene Domingo. It premiered on April 16, 2010. The show concluded on September 24, 2010, with a total of 24 episodes.

== Hosts ==
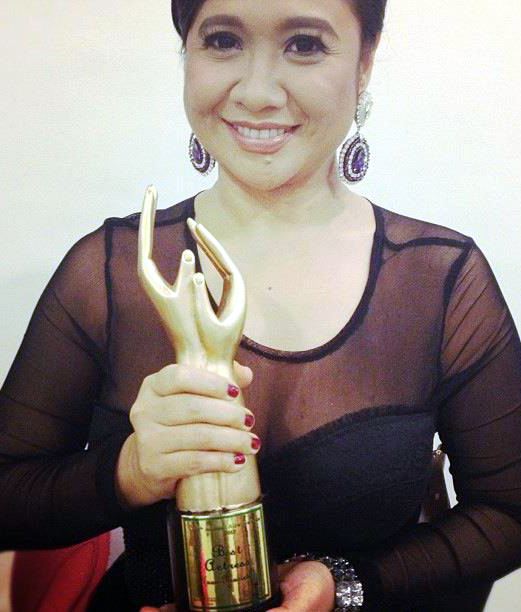
Eugene Domingo served as the host.

- Eugene Domingo
- Jillian Ward

== Ratings ==
According to AGB Nielsen Philippines' Mega Manila household television ratings, the pilot episode of Wachamakulit earned a 5.2% rating. The final episode scored a 2.8% rating in Mega Manila People/Individual television ratings.
