= Boys Night Out (radio program) =

Philippine evening radio talk show

Boys' Night Out
- Genre: Comedy, talk, music
- Running time: 180 minutes, Mondays - Thursdays, 9:00pm-12:00mn, (Philippine Time)
- Country of origin: Philippines
- Languages: English; Tagalog
- Home station: Magic 89.9 (2006–2025)
- Syndicates: Magic Nationwide (2006-2024)
- Hosted by: Slick Rick (2006-2025); Tony Toni (2006-2025); Tin Gamboa (2016-2025)
- Created by: Magic 89.9
- Original release: March 5, 2006 – September 30, 2025
- Website: www.magic899.fm

Boys' Night Out (commonly abbreviated to B.N.O.) was a Filipino evening radio talk show broadcast by Magic 89.9 from 2006 to 2025. It was hosted by DJs Slick Rick (Eric Virata), Tony Toni (Anthony James Bueno) and Tin Gamboa.

== History ==
=== Radio Tabloid ===
Boys' Night Out started as a small segment of Magic 89.9 called Radio Tabloid hosted by King DJ Logan and CJ the DJ. After moderate success the executives of the station decided to turn it into a radio talk show called Boys Night Out in March 2006 with Radio Tabloid becoming one of its segments renamed to Confession Sessions. The show was hosted by King DJ Logan with the addition of Slick Rick and Tony Toni. CJ was moved to host the weekday lunch show called the Big Meal.

King DJ Logan left the station to pursue a hosting career, a bar and restaurant business, and eventually worked for a call center in Alabang for a time.

=== 9pm-12am era ===
Sam YG joins Magic 89.9 and replaced the outgoing King DJ Logan on the show.

=== Format and schedule changes ===
In 2010, Magic 89.9, at the turning point of its career as the #1 and most popular radio station in the Philippines, made several changes to its shows' format and time slots very much to the liking of its listeners. Boys Night Out was moved to an earlier and longer time slot: Mondays to Thursdays, 6pm to 10pm. The show received positive feedback from its fans as it, to quote a listener: "helps ease the pain of traffic during rush hours at [sic] EDSA".

In 2015, they interviewed former Japanese AV Idol Maria Ozawa.

Boys Night Out was reduced into 3 hours from 6pm to 9pm. During the COVID-19 pandemic, it moved to an earlier time slot, broadcasting from 5pm to 7pm.

Sam YG left Boys Night Out after 17 years to pursue other hosting stints such as events and podcasts. Gino Quillamor joins as the 4th co-host of the show and later, replacement for Sam YG. Tin Gamboa (formerly known as Suzy) added as the only female co host in this show. Since 2023, Shannon Robinson also joins the show in between those days.

For several years, Toni Toni hosted a segment with sex psychotherapist Rica Cruz where they discussed Filipino sexual experiences and behaviors.

On May 19, 2025, Boys Night Out moved back to the 9:00 pm to 12:00 mn. On September 30, 2025, the show silently aired its final episode after 19 years on air. The show was supposed to end on October 2, 2025 but the management decided to suspend all of the show's hosts due to remarks made by co-host Tin Gamboa during the September 29 episode.

== Hosts ==
Final hosts

- Slick Rick (2006–2025)
- Tony Toni (2006–2025)
- Tin Gamboa (also known as Suzy; 2016–2025)

Former hosts

- King DJ Logan (2006–07)
- Sam YG (2007–23)
- Ramon Bautista (2011–14)
- Alex Calleja (2014–20)
- Dr. Rica Cruz (2016–20)
- Jojo the Love Survivor (2012–20)
- Gino Quillamor (2020–2025)
- Shannon Robinson (2023)
