= Sa Ngalan ng Ina =

- Genre: Drama
- Created by: Associated Broadcasting Company
- Directed by: Mario O'Hara; Jon Red
- Starring: Nora Aunor; Christopher de Leon
- Theme music composer: Ryan Cayabyab
- Opening theme: "Ikaw Pa Rin ang Mahal Ko" by Basil Valdez; Gerald Santos (Acoustic version)
- Country of origin: Philippines
- Original language: Filipino
- No. of episodes: 25

Production
- Executive producer: Manuel V. Pangilinan
- Running time: 30-45 minutes

Original release
- Network: TV5
- Release: October 3 – November 4, 2011

Sa Ngalan ng Ina (English: In the Name of the Mother) is a 2011 Philippine television drama series broadcast by TV5. Directed by Mario O'Hara and Jon Red, it stars Nora Aunor and Christopher de Leon. It aired from October 3 to November 4, 2011, replacing Carlo J. Caparas' Bangis and was replaced by Glamorosa.

== Plot ==
Elena Deogracias (Nora Aunor) is a second wife of a politician. While running for governor of the province of Verano, her husband, Armando Deogracias (Bembol Roco) was assassinated by a grenade explosion. This leads for the Party to replace Amang. They decided for Elena to be his substitute and won as governor of Verano.

== Cast and characters ==
=== Lead cast ===
- Nora Aunor† as Gov. Elena Toribio vda de. Deogracias
- Christopher de Leon as Gov. Jose "Pepe" Ilustre

=== Supporting cast ===
- Rosanna Roces as Lucia Ilustre
- Eugene Domingo as Pacita Toribio
- Ian de Leon as Zaldy Sanchez
- Nadine Samonte as Mayor Andrea Deogracias
- Edgar Allan Guzman as Angelo Deogracias
- Alwyn Uytingco as Alfonso Deogarcias
- Eula Caballero as Elsa Toribio
- Karel Marquez as Carmela Ilustre
- Bembol Roco as Mayor Armando "Amang" Deogracias
- Joross Gamboa as Ramoncito Concepcion
- Jay Aquitania as Manuel

=== Extended cast ===
- Raquel Villavicencio as Vice Gov. Dorinda Fernando
- Leo Rialp as Apo Lucas
- Joy Viado† as Maggie Sarmiento
- Mike Lloren as Greg
- Archie Adamos as Police Superintendent Santos
- Regine Angeles as Cathy

== Production ==
=== Casting ===
This marks the television return of Nora Aunor after eight years of hiatus from the United States. Another project of Aunor is a biopic about the life of Emilio Aguinaldo. This is also marks the reunion of Aunor with former husband Christopher de Leon along with their son Ian de Leon. They also worked in the film, I Love You Mama, I Love You Papa in 1986. Another actor added to the cast is Bembol Roco whom he had with Aunor and De Leon in the movie Tatlong Taong Walang Diyos. This is also the first primetime series of Eugene Domingo with TV5, her projects on TV5 were Ha Ha Hayop, Inday Wanda and Lucky Numbers. This is also marks the return of director Mario O'Hara along with independent director Jon Red. O'Hara also worked with Aunor, De Leon and Roco as the director of Tatlong Taong Walang Diyos. Among those were added are young TV5 talents. After Rod Santiago's The Sisters, this is also Nadine Samonte's second project with the network after her transfer from GMA Network and her first team with Joross Gamboa who was from rival talent search Star Circle Quest. This is also the second primetime project of Star Factor winner Eula Caballero. This is also the second project of Karel Marquez and her first project playing a non-antagonist role and Alwyn Uytingco playing a rebellious role. Both of them worked in Babaeng Hampaslupa.

=== Location ===
The production is shot in Taal, Batangas and Antipolo. The provincial capitol of Verano is seen at the Batangas Provincial Capitol in Batangas City while the offices of the Governor of Verano and Mayor of Salvacion is at the Taal Municipal Hall.

== Awards ==
Year	Group	Category	Nominee	Result
2013	Golden Screen TV Awards	Outstanding Original Drama Series		Nominated
2013	Golden Screen TV Awards	Outstanding Performance by an Actress in a Drama Series	Nora Aunor	Nominated
2013	Golden Screen TV Awards	Outstanding Performance by a Supporting Actress in a Drama Series	Eugene Domingo	Nominated
2013	Golden Screen TV Awards	Outstanding Performance by a Supporting Actor in a Drama Series	Alwyn Uytingco	Nominated
2013	Gawad Tangi Awards for Television (Kritiko ng Pelikula, Telebisyon at Musikang Pilipino)	Best Actress	Nora Aunor	Won
2012	26th PMPC Star Awards for Television	Best Actress	Nora Aunor	Won

== See also ==
- List of TV5 (Philippine TV network) original programming
