= Diz Iz It! =

2010 Philippine television variety show

- Title card
- Genre: Variety show
- Directed by: Poochie Rivera
- Presented by: Sam Y.G.; Bayani Agbayani; Grace Lee; Ehra Madrigal
- Country of origin: Philippines
- Original language: Tagalog
- No. of episodes: 127

Production
- Executive producers: Antonio P. Tuviera; Malou Choa-Fagar; Jose Mari Abacan
- Production locations: Studio 1, GMA Network Center, Quezon City, Philippines (February 2010 – March 2010); Westside Studio, GMA Broadway Centrum, Quezon City, Philippines (March 2010 – July 2010)
- Camera setup: Multiple-camera setup
- Running time: 105 minutes
- Production companies: TAPE Inc.; GMA Entertainment TV

Original release
- Network: GMA Network
- Release: February 8 – July 24, 2010

Diz Iz It! is a 2010 Philippine television variety show broadcast by GMA Network. Originally named as Todo Bigay, it premiered on February 8, 2010. The show concluded on July 24, 2010, with a total of 127 episodes.

== Hosts ==
- Bayani Agbayani
- Grace Lee
- Sam Y.G. a.k.a. Shivaker
- Ehra Madrigal

== Ratings ==
According to AGB Nielsen Philippines' Mega Manila household television ratings, the pilot episode of Diz Iz It! earned a 13.6% rating.
