= Ha Ha Hayop =

Philippine comedy show

- Genre: Comedy
- Created by: Perci Intalan
- Developed by: MPB Primedia, Inc.
- Directed by: Andoy Ranay
- Starring: Eugene Domingo
- Country of origin: Philippines
- Original language: Filipino
- No. of episodes: 41

Production
- Running time: 30 minutes

Original release
- Network: TV5
- Release: November 24, 2008 – August 31, 2009

Ha Ha Hayop is a Philippine television comedy show broadcast by TV5. Hosted by Eugene Domingo, it aired from November 24, 2008 to August 31, 2009, and was replaced by Kuwentong Talentado.

== See also ==
- List of TV5 (Philippine TV network) original programming
