= Eugene Domingo =

Filipino actress and comedian (born 1971)

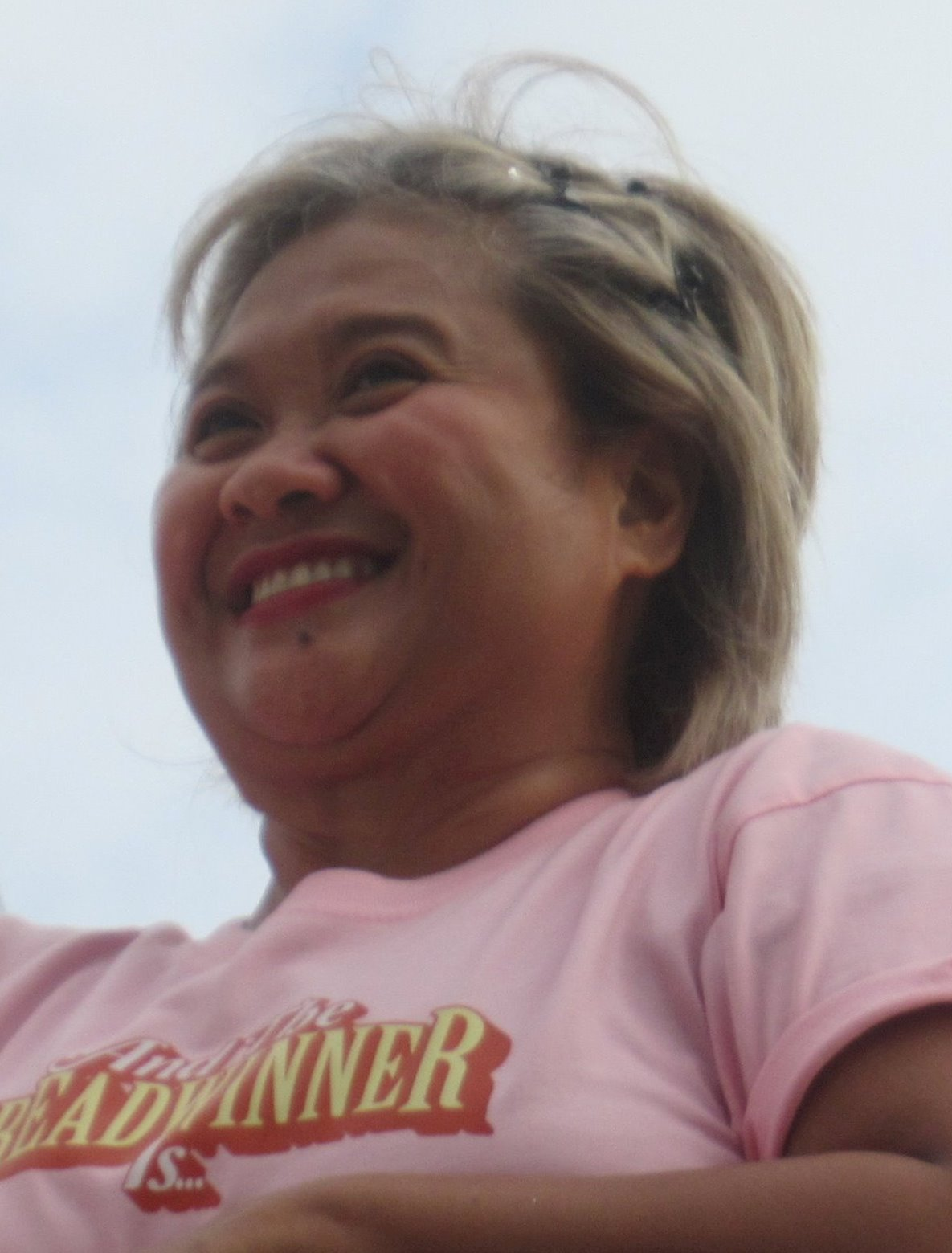
- Domingo in 2024
- Born: Eugenia Roxas Domingo; July 23, 1971 (age 55); Malate, Manila, Philippines
- Other name: Uge
- Education: University of the Philippines Diliman
- Occupations: Actress; comedian; host
- Years active: 1989–present
- Agent(s): ABS-CBN (1992–2008; 2024–present); GMA Network (2008–present); ALLTV (2024–present); TV5 (2026–present)
- Notable work: Kimmy Dora; Ang Babae Sa Septic Tank
- Spouse: Danilo Bottoni (m. 2023)

Eugenia "Eugene" Roxas Domingo-Bottoni (Tagalog: [ˈjudʒin ˈɾɔhas dɔˈmiŋgɔ]; born July 23, 1971), is a Filipino actress, comedienne and host. She has performed in lead and supporting roles in various genres of the Philippine film industry. She is popularly known as the "Comedy Star for All Seasons" and was a sidekick of the Philippine Queen of Comedy Ai-Ai delas Alas in the Ang Tanging Ina series (2003–2010), until her very first lead film role in Kimmy Dora in 2009. Domingo's films have collectively earned ₱1.81 billion, making her one of the highest grossing Filipino box office stars this century.

Domingo's other notable films include Bahay Kubo (2007) for which she received her first Best Supporting Actress award. Her most successful film to date is the Cinemalaya entry, Ang Babae Sa Septic Tank (2011), which is the highest-grossing independent film in Philippine history. The film was an official entry for various international film festivals in Vancouver, South Korea, Hawaii, Japan, and Italy. The film was also chosen by the Film Academy of the Philippines to represent the Philippines in the Best Foreign Language Film category of the 84th Academy Awards. Domingo achieved "Best Actress" awards, at the Cinemalaya (2011) and 10th Gawad Tanglaw for Films (2012). She also received the "People's Choice Award for Best Actress" at the 6th Asian Film Awards (2012) in Hong Kong and "Best Actress" award at the 3rd Pau International Film Festival in France.

Domingo is the only actress in the Philippine entertainment history to have participated in six films (Working Girls, Here Comes the Bride, Mamarazzi, Petrang Kabayo, RPG: Metanoia, Ang Tanging Ina Mo (Last na 'To!)) produced by eight major Filipino production companies (GMA Films, Regal Films, Unitel Productions, OctoArts Films, Quantum Films, VIVA Films, Ambient Media, and Star Cinema) within a year (in 2010). Domingo holds the record of being the first lead actress in Philippine cinema to star in the most films — seven — in a year. She was a contract artist of GMA Network, appearing on various comedy shows like Jejemom (2010), drama shows like Ako si Kim Sam Soon (2008), Ang Babaeng Hinugot Sa Aking Tadyang (2009) and First Time (2010). She also hosted Cool Center (2009–2010), Comedy Bar (2010–2011), Celebrity Bluff (2012–2018) and Dear Uge (2016–2022).

Apart from her television and mainstream appearance, she also headlined theater show in Bona produced by the Philippine Educational Theater Association in 2012. She was nominated as "Best Actress in a Play award" for her role at the International Theater Award and eventually hailed as "Best Actress in Theater role" for Bona at the 25th Aliw Awards.

== Life and career ==
=== 1971–2003: Early life and career beginnings ===
Eugenia Roxas Domingo was born on July 23, 1971, in Malate, Manila to Reynaldo Aguinaldo Domingo and Cecilia Atad Roxas. According to her, she was fond of copying her teachers and other people during her childhood life. She became interested in acting when she witnessed a musical held at the CCP Complex. She studied Theatre Arts at the University of the Philippines Diliman, apprenticing as an actress and production staff under the university's theatre company, Dulaang UP. As a theatre major, she went through selling tickets, inviting students to attend their play, begging professors to require students to watch, ushering the audience in and out of the auditorium, rehearsing all night, and learning from the not-so-conventional styles of the most diva directors. She spent eight years in her university studies, including one year at the Polytechnic University of the Philippines.

Domingo started her minor acting career through the movie Emma Salazar Case produced by Regal Entertainment in 1991. It was then followed by the biographical movie Maricris Sioson in 1993 and as a condominium maid in Sa Ngalan ng Pag-ibig in 1995. She was launched in television as Dolores in the series Valiente run by ABS-CBN and GMA Network in 1992 to 1997. In 1998, she appeared in a three films produced by Viva Films, Pagdating Ng Panahon, Ikaw Pa Rin Ang Iibigin and Pusong Mamon. She also appeared on the Book 1 of the GMA Network series Kirara, Ano Ang Kulay ng Pag-ibig? in 1999.

She had her first hosting role through D! Da in 1999. At one point however, she stopped went on hiatus because of frustration over her bit player roles. Domingo went back to school and finished her undergraduate thesis, performing the play 'night, Mother opposite Harlene Bautista. After finishing her degree, she continued to perform in several stage productions. Until a friend, television director Andoy Ranay, insisted that she give TV acting a second chance. She was immediately cast on ABS-CBN show, Sa Dulo Ng Walang Hanggan in 2002. According to her, "acting for TV was really sweeter the second time around, because i found companions who are, with utmost respect to craft, knowing they also came from theater...".

Following that, she was cast as Rowena in the television series Ang Tanging Ina produced by ABS-CBN in 2003, opposite Ai-Ai delas Alas. In the same year, she reprised her role at in the series' film adaptation produced by Star Cinema. She became famous in television through her role as a crazy woman named "Lorelie" in the fantasy series Marina starring Claudine Barretto. She was also cast in films such as Lastikman and Malikmata.

=== 2004–2009: Kimmy Dora and numerous films and awards ===
Domingo became known as a sidekick of Ai-Ai Delas Alas appearing again on the latter's film, Volta in 2004. The next year, she appeared on three films, as Tacing in Star Cinema's Can This Be Love, VIVA Films' Purita and in a cameo role in Seiko Films' Bikini Open. She was cast as Sister Clara, a nun in the series Kampanerang Kuba and also joined Eula Valdez and Jean Garcia on hosting a reality cooking show, Makuha Ka sa Tikim in 2005. Domingo achieved breakthrough in 2006 starring on six films from different production outfits. She appeared as Tina on the film D' Lucky Ones, and as Dora on You Are The One, both produced by Star Cinema. She also had major roles on Regal Films's Kapag Tumibok ang Puso and on the "LRT" episode of her first Metro Manila Film Festival film, Shake, Rattle and Roll 8. She also starred on a horror film, TxT as Aling Kuring.

Domingo became an award-winning actress in 2007, winning Best Supporting Actress at the 33rd Metro Manila Film Festival through her role in Bahay Kubo: A Pinoy Mano Po! starring Maricel Soriano. She starred on a total of 10 films in 2007, including her Cinemalaya entry Pisay and Seiko Films' Foster Child which gave Domingo two Best Supporting Actress awards at the 6th Gawad Tanglaw in 2008. She also appeared on comedy films, including her reunion with Ai-Ai Delas Alas in Pasukob and Ang Cute Ng Ina Mo. Some of her films in 2007 also include Apat Dapat, Dapat Apat with three other comedians, Candy Pangilinan, Pokwang and Rufa Mae Quinto. She also appeared on the GMA film The Promise starring Angel Locsin and Richard Gutierrez, and on Paano Kita Iibigin with Regine Velasquez and Piolo Pascual. Domingo also appeared on two series, Palimos ng Pag-Ibig and on a series, Kokey adapted from a film of the same title.

In 2008, Domingo starred on a Cinemalaya Independent Film Festival entry, 100 which awarded her as "Best Supporting Actress", her fourth in a span of two years. She also appeared on the sequel of Ang Tanging Ina, an official Metro Manila Film Festival entry titled Ang Tanging Ina N'yong Lahat. Domingo transferred from ABS-CBN to GMA Network in 2008, with I.T.A.L.Y. as her first project. She debuted as an official GMA Contract Artist through the comedy series Ako si Kim Sam Soon starring Regine Velasquez, a remake of a Korean series televised on the same network. She then appeared as Yaya Madel in the series Ang Babaeng Hinugot sa Aking Tadyang starring Marian Rivera and Dingdong Dantes. Domingo also appeared as Juaning on the Panoramanila Pictures film Ploning produced by Judy Ann Santos.

In 2009, Domingo appeared on her first lead movie role produced by Spring Films titled Kimmy Dora: Kambal sa Kiyeme, directed by Joyce Bernal and written by Chris Martinez. It tells the story of twin sisters Kimmy and Dora, both played by Domingo who are directly opposite each other in terms of characteristics and styles. Czeriza Valencia of Philippine Entertainment Portal noted that Domingo served as the funny factor in the film, since her skillful execution in playing the two roles made the situations hilarious. Lito Zulueta of the Philippine Daily Inquirer wrote that Domingo's performance "runs the gamut of comic inventiveness" and "confirms her status as the country's funniest comic ingénue". Although starring in her major role, Domingo stated that she is still open for supporting roles. She then appeared on the RVQ Production film Nobody, Nobody But... Juan starring Dolphy. In the same year, she appeared on the comedy series Adik Sa'Yo and on her third hosting role, Cool Center together with Allan K. She was also awarded "Bert Marcelo Award" for Comedians at the 2009 Guillermo Mendoza Foundation Awards.

=== 2010–2012: Ang Babae sa Septic Tank, international exposure and other films ===
Domingo reprised her role on the third installment of Tanging Ina, titled Ang Tanging Ina Mo (Last na 'To!) in 2008 wherein she won the Best Supporting Actress award at the 36th Metro Manila Film Festival. Her voice, as Mercedes also appeared on the animated film, RPG: Metanoia. She again starred on her second lead role in Mamarazzi produced by Regal Films and as Paula in GMA Films' Working Girls. Despite being a contract artist of GMA, she managed to appear on the Star Cinema films Here Comes The Bride and Petrang Kabayo. She is the only actress in the Philippine entertainment history to have participated in six films (Working Girls 2010, Here Comes the Bride, Mamarazzi, Petrang Kabayo, RPG: Metanoia, Ang Tanging Ina Mo (Last na 'To!)) produced by eight Filipino production companies (GMA Films, Regal Films, Unitel Productions, OctoArts Films, Quantum Films, Viva Films, Ambient Media, and Star Cinema) within a year. Domingo holds the record of being the first lead actress in Philippine cinema to star in the most films — seven — in a year.

She had her two hosting stints in GMA Network, through Comedy Bar and on the kiddie show Wachamakulit. She also appeared on her first sitcom, JejeMom, inspired from a text messaging style alias, Jejemon. She made her last appearance on a GMA Network series through her minor role as guidance counselor in the teen-oriented series First Time. Domingo appeared on TV5 through her comedy show, Inday Wanda.

2011 marked another successful year for Domingo wherein she starred in nine domestic films. She was paired with matinee idol Richard Gutierrez in the "Gunaw" (Apocalypse) episode of the trilogy My Valentine Girls. She was also cast as Belinda Eduque on Who's That Girl? and as Precy in Wedding Tayo, Wedding Hindi. According to a review from PEP, "She (Domingo) was still able to make the material fresh and entertaining. Her punch lines, although sometimes buried under long dialogues, and antics elicited laughter from viewers...". She also appeared on independent films, Remington and the Curse of the Zombadings produced by Origin8media. Domingo appeared on three films at the 2011 Metro Manila Film Festival through Enteng ng Ina Mo, Shake, Rattle & Roll 13 and My House Husband: Ikaw Na! wherein she won another "Best Supporting Actress" award.

In the same year, she appeared on the critically acclaimed Cinemalaya entry Ang Babae Sa Septic Tank, holding the record for the highest grossing Filipino independent film in history. The film was an official entry for the 2011 Vancouver International Film Festival, Pusan International Film Festival, Hawaii International Film Festival, Tokyo International Film Festival, and the Far East Asian Film Festival in Italy. The film was also chosen by the Film Academy of the Philippines to represent the country in the Best Foreign Language Film category of the 84th Academy Awards. Through the film, Domingo was awarded as "Best Actress" at the Cinemalaya (2011) and the 10th Gawad Tanglaw for Films (2012). She was also awarded the "People's Choice Award for Best Actress" at the 6th Asian Film Awards (2012) in Hong Kong. She was also nominated as Best Actress at the 35th Gawad URIAN Awards and 28th PMPC Star Awards for Movies in 2012. She was also named "Comedienne of the Year" at the Yahoo! OMG Awards. She also received the "Best Actress" award at the 3rd Pau International Film Festival in France. According to a review on Philippine Entertainment Portal, Domingo proved her versatility as an actress.

In 2012, Domingo starred on the poorly-acclaimed sequel of Kimmy Dora, subtitled as Kimmy Dora and The Temple of Kiyeme shot in the Philippines and South Korea. She also starred on the first Filipino musical film, I Do Bidoo Bidoo: Heto nAPO Sila! produced by Unitel in partnership with Studio 5. It was a tribute to APO Hiking Society, and received positive reviews from critics. She also hosted a game show under GMA Network, Celebrity Bluff with comic duo, Jose Manalo and Wally Bayola. Domingo also starred on theater through Bona, produced by the Philippine Educational Theater Association (PETA). She was a call center agent obsessed with actor-wannabe Edgar Allan Guzman. She was nominated as "Best Actress in a Play award" for her role at the International Theater Award. She was also hailed as "Best Actress" for Bona at the 25th Aliw Awards in 2012. According to Gibz Cadiz of the Philippine Daily Inquirer, Domingo is a tremendous actress, her theater background coming to the fore in her command of space, the way she deploys her vocal instrument, her ability to think on her feet (her every adlib is a hit with the audience).

=== 2013–2018: Critically-acclaimed projects ===
Domingo was featured on another Cinemalaya entry for 2013, Instant Mommy, a comedy film about a wardrobe mistress in TV commercials who fakes a pregnancy to keep her Japanese fiancé. The film was written and directed by Leo Abaya, and another team-up work with Chris Martinez as one of the producers, who directed Domingo on the two Kimmy Dora movies, Here Comes The Bride, Ang Babae sa Septic Tank and I Do Bidoo Bidoo. Co-produced by Quantum Films and Kris Aquino, Instant Mommy also stars Japanese actor Yuki Matsuzaki, who was part of the Hollywood films Letters from Iwo Jima and Pirates of the Caribbean: On Stranger Tides. According to Matsuzaki, he was impressed by Domingo's performance in Ang Babae sa Septic Tank which made him agree to be her leading man.

She worked again with Star Cinema on the film Tuhog, a black-comedy which also stars Jake Cuenca and Enchong Dee and directed by Ronnie Velasco, which was originally submitted for the 2012 Metro Manila Film Festival, but failed to make the final cut. She also joined Maricel Soriano, Billy Crawford and Andi Eigenmann on the film Momzillas, produced by Viva Films. The film was her second with Soriano. In an interview with Manila Bulletin, she revealed that she will be doing her first lead role for MMFF in 2013. On June 18, 2013; MMDA Chairman Francis Tolentino announced the eight official entries of the year's festival, which included the third installment of Kimmy Dora titled Kimmy Dora: The Quantum of Kiyeme.

Domingo also replaced Kris Aquino in the Jun Lana film Barber's Tales (Kuwentong Barbero). The second installment in Lana's small-town trilogy (the first being Bwakaw (2012)) is about a widow defying gender role expectations in the 1970s by running her late husband's barbershop. The film won four awards at the Hong Kong Asia Film Financing Forum (HAF), including the top prize HAF Award, the ARRI Award, which allows access to rental of camera and lighting equipment, the Technicolor Asia award, which comes with post-production services from the Thai firm of the same name, and the second Catapooolt award. Domingo also won as "Best Actress" at the 26th Tokyo International Film Festival in Japan. According to Domingo, the award is a stepping stone of the Filipinos to be recognized in Asian cinema.

In 2013, Domingo was one of the Dekada awardees at the 10th Golden Screen Awards for Movies for their cumulative trophies on its past awards. Domingo also appeared on another Chris Martinez movie, for Regal Films titled as Status: It's Complicated with Paulo Avelino, Solenn Heussaff, and Jake Cuenca. It is a reworking project of the classic Ishmael Bernal comedy Salawahan.

=== 2019–present: Recent projects ===
In 2019, Domingo starred in Ang Babae sa Septic Tank 3: The Real Untold Story of Josephine Bracken, the last installment for the Ang Babae sa Septic Tank trilogy. The film was streamed exclusive via iWantTV. From 2020 to 2022, Domingo was in hiatus due to the COVID-19 pandemic. In 2023, she returned to the film industry through the Amazon Prime exclusive mistress-murder-mystery film Ten Little Mistresses, the first Filipino film on the platform. The film was directed by Jun Lana with Pokwang, Carmi Martin, John Arcilla and Agot Isidro as co-actors.

Domingo starred in Here Comes the Groom, an official entry for the 2023 Metro Manila Summer Film Festival held on April 8, 2023, and a sequel of the 2010 film Here Comes the Bride, both directed by Chris Martinez. In 2024, she starred alongside Vice Ganda in the family comedy-drama film And the Breadwinner Is..., which also competed in the 2024 Metro Manila Film Festival. 2025 marks her year returning to ABS-CBN as being one of the resident judge of Pilipinas Got Talent season 7. In August 2025, Domingo also made her musical theater debut in the Philippine staging of Into The Woods produced by Theatre Group Asia playing as Jack's Mother. She played alongside Lea Salonga (the Witch), Arielle Jacobs (Cinderella), Nyoy Volante (the Baker), Josh Dela Cruz (Cinderella's Prince/the Wolf), with Nic Chien playing as her onstage son, Jack, among others. The show ran at the Samsung Performing Arts Theater in Circuit, Makati from August 7 to August 31, 2025, at 7:30 P.M. during Thursdays and Fridays with an additional Matinee show at 2:00 P.M. during the weekend runs.

== Personal life ==
Domingo is married to Danilo Bottoni, a Muslim Italian and a film critic, since 2016.

== Artistry ==
=== Influences ===
Domingo admires Lolita Rodriguez, for the reason she states that, "...when she(Rodriguez) decided to walk away and just be a normal person, it meant that she was already satisfied and that she's made a mark and that she would never be forgotten..." She also cited the Superstar, Nora Aunor as her inspiration, but she admitted she doesn't want to be compared with Aunor who originally showcased Domingo's latest theater role, Bona. She also cited the Philippines Star For All Season, Vilma Santos as one of her idols. She also parodied some of the famous dialogues and looks of Santos in various films such as D' Lucky Ones. Domingo also announced admiration for the Philippine actress, Maricel Soriano who is dubbed as "The Diamond Star". She likes how she handled her career and all the issues being thrown at her and she was impressed by her class and elegance.

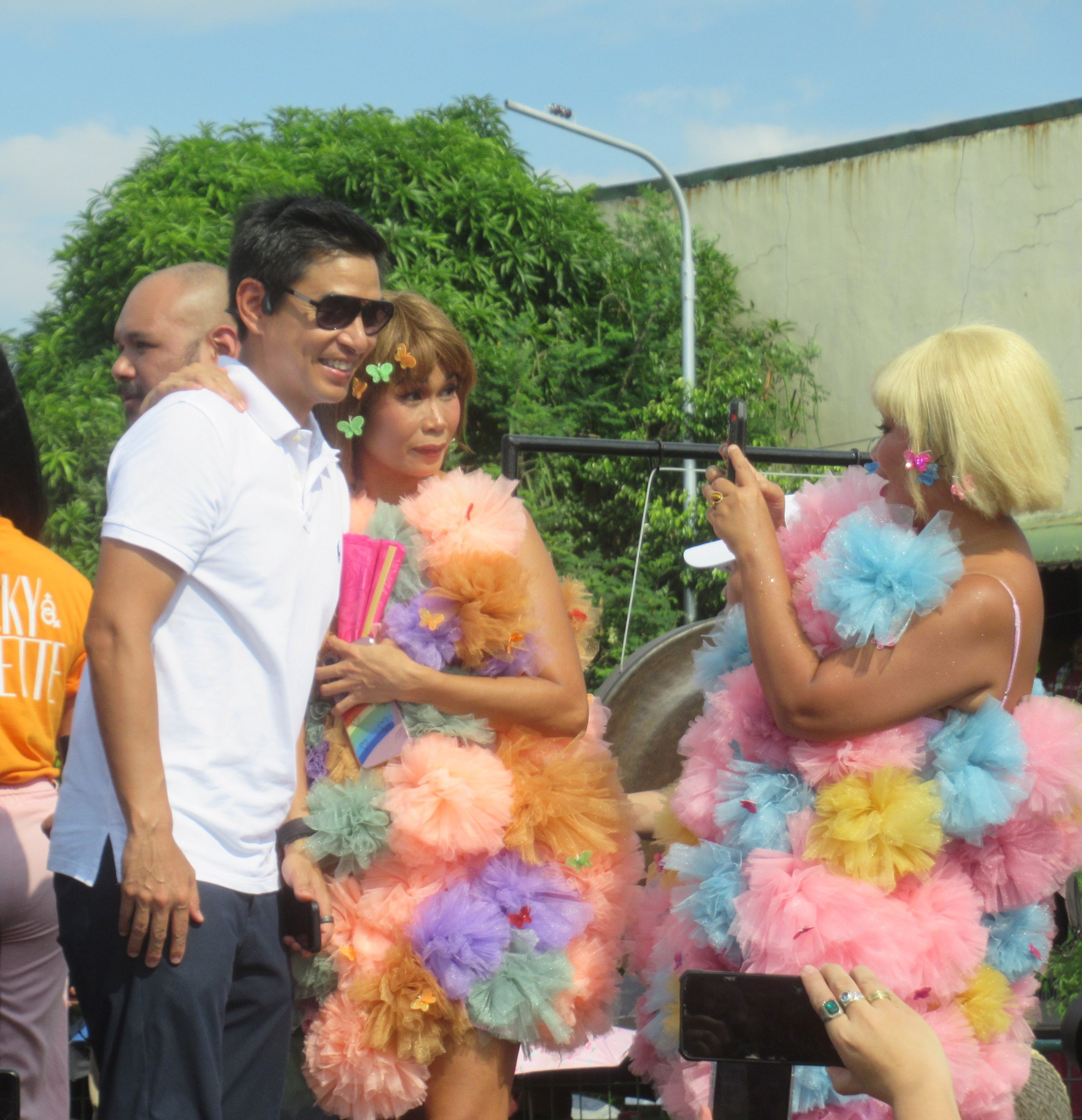
Becky & Badette - Domingo Pokwang and John Rey Tiangco

=== Styles ===
Domingo shows in her projects that her comic touch is still very much apparent as she delivers one-liners that elicit cheers from the appreciative crowd. According to Philippine Entertainment Portal, she gives no exaggeration in her roles, be it as a popular actress or a weary mother. Considering how her past films are, her acting styles just grabbed the audience senseless and ended up picking themselves up after rolling on the floor laughing. Domingo has a wide range of acting skill, from full-on hysterical to completely flat-line dramatic acting. According to her, "...everybody has a gift, some are developed. But the truly gifted are born with it. But they should never take it for granted. Acting workshops can help, but practice and exposure and training constitute the real deal...". She further added that her theater experience has given her the medium for her acting styles.

According to GMA News, Domingo brings her signature style to her movies especially on the musical I Do Bidoo Bidoo: Heto nAPO Sila! as a no-nonsense yet loving mother. As the stronger maternal figure, she gets to show it with some of the movie's best lines. Her timing on line delivery also adds to her style as a comedian, and she often steals spotlights because of her witty lines. Her quips often elicit laughter from the audience because she plays her character to maximum comedic effect.

== Filmography ==
=== Television ===
Year	Title	Role
1989–95	Pinpin	Herself
1992–97	Valiente	Dolores
1993	We R Family	
1998–2005	Wansapanataym	Various Roles
1999	D! Day	Herself / Co-host
1999	Tabing Ilog	Judith "JB" Bradley
1999	Saan Ka Man Naroroon	Patricia Sta. Cruz (Reporter)
1999	Kirara, Ano ang Kulay ng Pag-ibig?	Belen
2000–01	Gags Must Be Crazy	
2001–03	Sa Dulo ng Walang Hanggan	Feliza "Simang" Bernardo
2003	Ang Tanging Ina	Rowena
2004	Marina	Lorelei
2005	Makuha Ka sa Tikim	Herself (host)
2005	Maalaala Mo Kaya: Pancit	Cecil
2005	Kampanerang Kuba	Sister Clara
2006	Make-Over	Herself (host)
2007	Sineserye Presents: Palimos ng Pag-ibig	Mitos
2007	Kokey	Charisse
2008	Volta	Nancy
2008	Maynila	Nana Elain
2008	Ako si Kim Samsoon	Chef Dina
2008–09	Ha Ha Hayop	Herself (host)
2009	Ang Babaeng Hinugot sa Aking Tadyang	Madeline "Madel" Morales
2009–10	Cool Center	Herself (host)
2009	Adik Sa'Yo	Fatima Lidenberg
2010	First Time	Barbarella Buncalan Jackson
2010	SRO Cinema Serye: Hot Mama	Dr. Lola Cardenas
2010	Wachamakulit	Herself (host)
2010–11	Comedy Bar	Herself / Main Host
2010	Claudine: Partners	Lucy
2010	JejeMom	Gigi Dela Cruz / Stephanie Jones
2010–11	Inday Wanda	Wanda
2011	Cinderella	Bb. Paulette / Fairy Godmother (voice)
2011	Sa Ngalan ng Ina	Pacita Toribio
2012–16; 2017–18	Celebrity Bluff	Herself (host)
2012	Eat Bulaga!	Herself (guest host)
2013	Del Monte Kitchenomics	Herself (guest host)
2014	Picture! Picture!	Herself (guest co-host)
2015	Sabado Badoo	Herself / Cameo Footage Featured
2016–22	Dear Uge	Herself (host)
2017	Full House Tonight	Herself (special guest)
2017	Daig Kayo ng Lola Ko	Pagong
2019	Ang Babae sa Septic Tank 3: The Real Untold Story of Josephine Bracken	Herself / Josephine Bracken
2022–24	All-Out Sundays	Herself (co-host / performer / various)
2024	It's Showtime	Herself (guest / performer)
2025	Pilipinas Got Talent (season 7)	Herself (judge)
2025	Eat Bulaga!	Herself (guest / performer)
2026	Rainbow Rumble	Herself (contestant)

=== Film ===
Year	Title	Role	Note(s)
1991	Emma Salazar Case	Lourdes	
1993	Maricris Sioson: Japayuki	Reporter	
1995	Sa Ngalan ng Pag-ibig	Condominium Maid	
1995	The Flor Contemplacion Story	News Reporter	
1997	The Sarah Balabagan Story	Lucille	
1998	Pusong Mamon	Sally	
1998	Ikaw Pa Rin ang Iibigin	Donna	
1998	Pagdating ng Panahon	---	
1999	Bullet	Mabel's friend	
1999	Ms. Kristina Moran: Babaeng Palaban	---	
1999	Dito sa Puso Ko	Joselyn	
2000	Mahal Kita, Walang Iwanan	Gigi	
2000	Pangarap ng Puso	Virginia	
2000	Laro sa Baga	Annie	
2002	Kung Ikaw Ay Isang Panaginip	Josie	
2002	Pakisabi Na Lang... Mahal Ko Siya	Michi	
2003	Ang Tanging Ina	Rowena	Supporting role
2003	Lastikman	Larry's High School Teacher	
2003	Malikmata	Gracia	
2004	Volta	Nancy	
2005	Can This Be Love	Tancing	
2005	Bikini Open	Contestant's mother	
2005	Tuli	Purita	
2006	D' Lucky Ones!	Tina	
2006	Kapag Tumibok ang Puso: Not Once, But Twice	Adora	
2006	You Are the One	Dora	
2006	TxT	Aling Kuring	
2006	Reyna	Patria Balisteros	Supporting role
2006	Shake, Rattle and Roll 8	Lita	segment "LRT"
2007	The Promise	Yaya Delia	
2007	Ang Cute ng Ina Mo!	Nanny Ninonu	Supporting role
2007	Paano Kita Iibigin	Liwayway	
2007	Foster Child	Bianca	
2007	Pisay	Ms. Casas	
2007	Apat Dapat, Dapat Apat: Friends 4 Lyf and Death	Maria Dalisay "Dolly" Dollgalcon	Main role
2007	Pasukob	Juanita Rose San Miguel	
2007	Katas ng Saudi	Tessie	Official for the 33rd Metro Manila Film Festival Entry
2007	Shake, Rattle and Roll 9	Lady in Marionne's Nightmare	segment "Bangungot"
2007	Bahay Kubo	Marang	
2008	Ploning	Juaning	
2008	Ikaw Pa Rin, Bongga Ka Boy	Shiela	Supporting role
2008	My Monster Mom	Marilou	
2008	I.T.A.L.Y. (I Trust and Love You)	Lovely Mercado	
2008	100	Ruby	
2008	Ang Tanging Ina N'yong Lahat	Rowena	Supporting role, Official for the 34th Metro Manila Film Festival Entry
2009	Kimmy Dora: Kambal sa Kiyeme	Kimmy, Dora and Charito Go Dong Hae	Main role
2009	Biyaheng Lupa	Irene	
2009	Nobody, Nobody But... Juan	Julie	
2009	Shake, Rattle & Roll XI	Diablo (female)	segment "Diablo"; Voice role
2010	Working Girls	Paula Cajanding	
2010	Here Comes the Bride	Ninang Precy / Stef	Main role
2010	Mamarazzi	Violet "Violy"/Wilhelmina/Violet's Mom/Arab Woman	Main role
2010	Petrang Kabayo	Doña Biday Kasimsiman	Special participation
2010	RPG Metanoia	Mommy	Voice role
2010	Ang Tanging Ina Mo: Last Na 'To!	Rowena	Supporting role, Official for the 36th Metro Manila Film Festival Entry
2011	My Valentine Girls	Ivy	segment "Gunaw"
2011	Who's That Girl?	Belinda Eduque	
2011	The Howl & the Fussyket	Ana Lumibao	Short film
2011	The Woman in the Septic Tank	herself / Mila	Original title: Ang Babae sa Septic Tank
2011	Wedding Tayo, Wedding Hindi!	Precy Matias	
2011	Zombadings 1: Patayin sa Shokot si Remington	Mrs. Montano	
2011	Enteng ng Ina Mo	Rowena	Supporting role, Official for the 37th Metro Manila Film Festival Entry
2011	My House Husband: Ikaw Na!	Aida	Supporting role, Official for the 37th Metro Manila Film Festival Entry
2011	Shake, Rattle & Roll 13	Cynthia Gomez	segment "Rain Rain Go Away"
2012	Kimmy Dora and the Temple of Kiyeme	Kimmy/Dora/Charito Go Dong Hae	Main role
2012	I Do Bidoo Bidoo: Heto nAPO Sila!	Rosie Polotan	
2013	Tuhog	Fiesta Dacanay	Main role
2013	Instant Mommy	Bechay	
2013	Momzillas	Minerva Capistrano	Main role
2013	Status: It's Complicated!	Marian David	
2013	Kimmy Dora: Ang Kiyemeng Prequel	Kimmy/Dora Go Dong Hae	Main role, Official for the 39th Metro Manila Film Festival Entry
2014	Barber's Tales	Marilou	Main role
2015	La Amigas	Margarita "Maggie" Tabernilla	
2016	Ang Babae sa Septic Tank 2: #ForeverIsNotEnough	Herself/Romina	Lead role, Official for the 42nd Metro Manila Film Festival Entry
2016	Die Beautiful	Maumau Zaldriaga/Herself	Guest appearance, Official for the 42nd Metro Manila Film Festival Entry
2020	Hayop Ka!	Manghuhula	Voice role
2021	Big Night!	Madam	
2023	Ten Little Mistresses	Lilith	
2023	Here Comes the Groom	Joy Gising	Supporting role, Official for the 1st Metro Manila Summer Film Festival
2023	Becky and Badette	Becky	Main role, Official for the 49th Metro Manila Film Festival Entry
2024	And the Breadwinner Is...	Baby Salvador	Supporting role, Official for the 50th Metro Manila Film Festival Entry
2024	Espantaho	Georgia	Supporting role, Official for the 50th Metro Manila Film Festival Entry
2025	Flower Girl	---	Cameo
2025	Kontrabida Academy	Mauricia	Lead role
2025	Ang Happy Homes ni Diane Hilario	Karen	Supporting role
2025	Unmarry	Atty. Jacqueline Lambridas	Supporting role, Official for the 51st Metro Manila Film Festival Entry
2026	Sisa	Delia	Supporting role, Official for the 29th Tallinn Black Nights Film Festival Entry

== Awards and nominations ==
Year	Award giving body	Category	Work	Result
2007	33rd Metro Manila Film Festival	Best Supporting Actress	Bahay Kubo: A Pinoy Mano Po!	Won
2008	FAP Luna Awards	Best Supporting Actress	Bahay Kubo: A Pinoy Mano Po!	Nominated
2008	FAP Luna Awards	Best Supporting Actress	Paano Kita Iibigin	Nominated
2008	6th Gawad Tanglaw Awards	Best Supporting Actress	Pisay	Won
2008	6th Gawad Tanglaw Awards	Best Supporting Actress	Foster Child	Won
2008	31st Gawad URIAN Awards	Best Supporting Actress	Foster Child	Nominated
2008	4th Cinemalaya Film Festival	Best Supporting Actress	100	Won
2009	11th Gawad PASADO Awards	Pinakapasadong Katuwang na Aktres	Ang Tanging Ina N'yong Lahat	Won
2009	40th GMMSF Box-Office Entertainment Awards	Bert Marcelo Award		Won
2010	26th PMPC Star Awards for Movies	Movie Actress of the Year	Kimmy Dora	Nominated
2010	7th Golden Screen Awards for Movies	Best Actress in a Comedy or Musical	Kimmy Dora	Won
2010	33rd Gawad URIAN Awards	Best Actress	Kimmy Dora	Nominated
2010	36th Metro Manila Film Festival	Best Supporting Actress	Ang Tanging Ina Mo: Last Na 'To!	Won
2011	27th PMPC Star Awards for Movies	Movie Supporting Actress of the Year	Ang Tanging Ina Mo: Last Na 'To!	Nominated
2011	59th FAMAS Awards	Best Supporting Actress	Here Comes the Bride	Won
2011	37th Metro Manila Film Festival	Best Supporting Actress	My House Husband: Ikaw Na!	Won
2011	7th Cinemalaya Film Festival	Best Actress	Ang Babae Sa Septic Tank	Won
2012	10th Gawad Tanglaw for Films	Best Actress	Ang Babae Sa Septic Tank	Won
2012	9th Golden Screen Awards	Best Performance by an Actress in a Leading Role (Musical or Comedy)	Ang Babae Sa Septic Tank	Won
2012	28th PMPC Star Awards for Movies	Movie Actress of the Year	Ang Babae Sa Septic Tank	Nominated
2012	28th PMPC Star Awards for Movies	Movie Supporting Actress of the Year	My House Husband: Ikaw Na!	Nominated
2012	35th Gawad URIAN Awards	Best Actress	Ang Babae Sa Septic Tank	Nominated
2012	3rd PAU International Film Festival	Best Actress	Ang Babae Sa Septic Tank	Won
2012	6th Asian Film Awards	People's Choice Award for Best Actress	Ang Babae Sa Septic Tank	Won
2012	25th Aliw Awards	Best Actress (Non-Musical)	Bona	Won
2012	43rd GMMSF Box-Office Entertainment Awards	Comedy Actress of the Year		Won
2013	Golden Screen TV Awards	Outstanding Supporting Actress in a Drama Series	Sa Ngalan ng Ina	Nominated
2013	10th Golden Screen Awards for Movies	Best Leading Actress (Comedy or Musical)	I Do Bidoo Bidoo	Nominated
2013	10th Golden Screen Awards for Movies	Dekada awardee		Won
2013	Yahoo! Philippines OMG! Awards	Comedienne of the Year	Herself	Won
2013	Tokyo International Film Festival	Best Actress	Barber's Tales	Won
2013	27th PMPC Star Awards for Television	Best Game Show Host	Celebrity Bluff	Nominated
2013	39th Metro Manila Film Festival	Best Actress	Kimmy Dora: Ang Kiyemeng Prequel	Nominated
2014	1st Paragala Central Luzon Media Awards	Best Game Show Host	Celebrity Bluff	Won
2014	5th Northwest Samar State University Students' Choice Awards	Best Comedy Show Host	Celebrity Bluff	Won
2014	5th Golden Screen TV Awards	Outstanding Game/Talent Program Host	Celebrity Bluff	Won
2014	11th Golden Screen Awards	Best Performance by an Actress in a Lead Role – Musical or Comedy	Instant Mommy	Nominated
2014	28th PMPC Star Awards for Television	Best Game Show Host	Celebrity Bluff	Nominated
2015	31st PMPC Star Awards for Movies	Movie Actress of the Year	Barber's Tales	Nominated
2015	6th Golden Screen TV Awards	Outstanding Game or Talent Program Host	Celebrity Bluff	Won
2015	38th Gawad Urian Awards	Best Actress	Barber's Tales	Nominated
2016	42nd Metro Manila Film Festival	Best Actress	Ang Babae sa Septic Tank 2: Forever is Not Enough	Nominated
2021	47th Metro Manila Film Festival	Best Supporting Actress	Big Night	Nominated
2022	70th FAMAS Awards	Best Supporting Actress	Big Night	Nominated
2022	45th Gawad Urian Awards	Best Supporting Actress	Big Night	Nominated
2022	5th Entertainment Editors' Choice Awards	Best Supporting Actress	Big Night	Nominated
2022	PMPC Star Awards for Movies	Movie Supporting Actress of the Year	Big Night	Nominated
2023	49th Metro Manila Film Festival	Best Actress	Becky & Badette	Nominated
2023	49th Metro Manila Film Festival	Best Original Song	"Finggah Lickin'" from Becky & Badette	Won
2025	51st Metro Manila Film Festival	Best Supporting Actress	Unmarry	Nominated
