= Dear Uge =

Philippine television comedy series

- Title card from 2021 to 2022
- Genre: Comedy
- Written by: Jojo Nones; Senedy Que; Joseph Balboa; Jessie Villabrille; Kathleen Kaye Sone; Riza del Rio; Mark Angelo Sakay
- Creative director: Cesar Cosme
- Starring: Eugene Domingo; Divine Aucina
- Country of origin: Philippines
- Original language: Tagalog
- No. of episodes: (list of episodes)

Production
- Production locations: Studio 7, GMA Network Studios Annex, Quezon City, Philippines
- Camera setup: Multiple-camera setup
- Running time: 60 minutes
- Production companies: GMA Entertainment Group; Uge Productions Inc.

Original release
- Network: GMA Network
- Release: February 14, 2016 – February 13, 2022

Dear Uge is a Philippine television comedy anthology series broadcast by GMA Network. Starring Eugene Domingo and Divine Aucina, it premiered on February 14, 2016 on the network's Sunday Grande sa Hapon line up. The series concluded on February 13, 2022.

The series is streaming online on YouTube.

== Premise ==
Urbana Genoveva Esperanza hosts a web show titled as Dear Uge where she features love stories. Joining her in the show is her feeling charming sidekick, Devine.

== Cast and characters ==
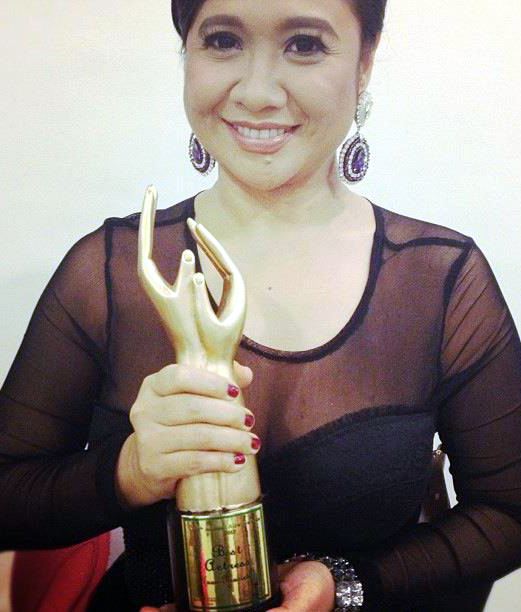
Eugene Domingo portrays Uge Esperanza.

Main cast

- Eugene Domingo as Urbana Genoveva "Uge" Esperanza
- Divine Aucina as Divine

Recurring cast

- Skelly Clarkson as Hercules (2016)
- Jessah Nicole as Mercy (2016)
- Dave Bornea as Diego (2018)
- Tery Gian (2018)
- Euwenn Aleta (2019)
- Jo Berry as So Very (2019)
- Jelai Andres (2019)
- Atak Araña as Kata / Kerry (2016–17)
- Jak Roberto as Berto (2016–18)
- Aaron Yanga as Darak (2016–18)

== Production ==
Principal photography was halted in March 2020 due to the enhanced community quarantine in Luzon caused by the COVID-19 pandemic. The show resumed its programming on August 23, 2020.

== Ratings ==
According to AGB Nielsen Philippines' Mega Manila household television ratings, the pilot episode of Dear Uge earned a 15% rating.

== Accolades ==
Accolades received by Dear Uge
| Year | Award | Category | Recipient | Result | Ref. |
|---|---|---|---|---|---|
| 2016 | 11th Seoul International Drama Awards | Comedy Category | Dear Uge | Nominated | |
| 2017 | 31st PMPC Star Awards for Television | Best Drama Anthology | Dear Uge | Nominated | |
| 2018 | 32nd PMPC Star Awards for Television | Best Drama Anthology | Dear Uge | Nominated | |
| 2018 | 40th Catholic Mass Media Awards | Best Comedy Program | Dear Uge | Won | |
| 2019 | Anak TV Seal Awards | | Dear Uge | Won | |
| 2019 | 7th Kagitingan Awards | Pinaka-magiting na Programang Telebisyon | Dear Uge | Won | |
| 2019 | 17th Gawad Tanglaw Awards | Best Comedy Show | Dear Uge | Won | |
| 2019 | 33rd PMPC Star Awards for Television | Best Drama Anthology | Dear Uge | Nominated | |
| 2021 | 34th PMPC Star Awards for Television | Best Drama Anthology | Dear Uge | Nominated | |
