= List of awards and nominations received by Julie Anne San Jose =

Julie Anne San Jose awards and nominations
Awards and nominations
Award	Wins	Nominations

Totals (Note: Certain award groups do not simply award one winner. They acknowledge several different recipients, have runners-up, and have third place. Since this is a specific recognition and is different from losing an award, runner-up mentions are considered wins in this award tally. For simplification and to avoid errors, each award in this list has been presumed to have had a prior nomination.)
- Wins: 71
- Nominations: 101

Julie Anne San Jose is a Filipino singer-songwriter and actress who has received several awards and nominations for her songs and music including six Aliw Awards, six Wish 107.5 Music Awards, five Awit Awards, three PMPC Star Awards for Music, three Myx Music Awards, two Catholic Mass Media Awards, two GMMSF Box Office Entertainment Awards, a New York Festival TV and Film Awards, an Asian Academy Creative Awards and International Song Contest: Global Sound Awards.

As an actress and television personality, she received two FAMAS Award, two PMPC Star Awards for Television, two Anak TV Awards including three nominations from EdukCircle Awards.

== Music ==
=== Aliw Awards ===
Year	Nominee / work	Award	Result
2011	Herself	Best Teen Performer	Won
2013	Its My Time Concert	Best Female Performance In A Concert	Nominated
2018	#Julie	Best Female Performance In A Concert	Nominated
2019	Julie Sings The Diva	Best Major Concert (Female)	Won
2020	Better	Best Rhythm and Blues/Jazz Artist	Won
2020	Performer	Entertainer Of The Year	Won
2024	JuliexStell: Ang Ating Tinig	Best Collaboration in a Major Concert	Won
2024	Performer	Entertainer Of The Year	Won

=== Awit Awards ===
Year	Nominee / work	Award	Result
2013	I'll Be There	Best Performance by a Female Recording Artist	Nominated
2013	I'll Be There	Best Performance by a New Female Recording Artist	Nominated
2013	I'll Be There	Best Ballad Recording	Nominated
2013	Enough	Best R&B Recording	Won
2013	Julie Anne San Jose	Album of the Year	Nominated
2014	Pagbangon	Best Inspirational/Religious Recording	Nominated
2015	Dedma	Best Rap Recording with Abra	Won
2015	Deeper	Best Selling Album of the Year	Won
2015	"Ikaw, Ako at Siya"	Best Song Written for Movie/TV/Stage Play with Janno Gibbs and Jaya	Nominated
2017	Chasing The Light	Best Performance by a Female Recording Artist for "Chasing The Light"	Nominated
2017	Magic Ng Pasko	Best Christmas Recording	Nominated
2019	Breakthrough	People's Voice Favorite Album Of The Year	Won
2019	Down For Me	People's Voice Favorite Collaboration with Fern.	Won

=== Myx Music Awards ===
Year	Nominee / work	Award	Result
2013	I'll Be There	Favorite Mellow Video	Won
2013	Herself	Favorite Celebrity Vj	Won
2015	Right Where You Belong	Favorite Mellow Video	Won

=== PMPC Star Awards For Music ===
Year	Nominee / work	Award	Result
2013	Herself	New Female Recording Artist of the Year	Won
2013	Herself	Female Pop Artist of the Year	Nominated
2013	Julie Anne San Jose Album	Pop Album of the Year	Nominated
2013	Bakit Ngayon	Song of the Year	Nominated
2017	Herself	Female Recording Artist of the Year	Nominated
2017	Naririnig Mo Ba?	Music Video of the Year	Nominated
2017	Chasing The Light	Album of the Year	Nominated
2017	Chasing The Lights	Song of the Year	Nominated
2017	Chasing The Light	Pop Album Of The Year of the Year	Nominated
2017	Herself	Female Artist Of The Year	Nominated
2017	Herself	Female Pop Artist of the Year	Won
2019	Regrets	Music Video Of The Year	Nominated
2019	Herself	Female Recording Artist Of The Year	Nominated
2019	Breakthrough	Album Of The Year	Nominated
2019	Regrets	Female Pop Artist Of The Year	Won
2019	Down For Me feat. Fern	Collaboration Of The Year	Nominated

=== Wish Music Awards ===
Year	Nominee / work	Award	Result
2017	Naririnig Mo Ba	Wish Original Song Of The Year By A Female Artist	Nominated
2019	Your Song	Bronze Wishclusive Elite Circle Award	Won
2019	Down For Me (feat. Fern)	Urban Song Of The Year	Won
2019	Nothing Left	Wishclusive Pop Performance of the Year	Nominated
2019	Your Song	Wishclusive Ballad Performance of the Year	Nominated
2020	Your Song	Silver Wishclusive Elite Circle Award	Won
2020	Your Song	Wishers' Choice Artist Of The Year	Won
2021	Better	Wish R&B Song of the Year	Won
2021	Nobela	Wishclusive Contemporary R&B Performance of the Year	Won

== International recognitions ==
=== Seoul International Drama Awards ===
Year	Nominee/Work	Award	Result	Host country
2023	Herself/Maria Clara At Ibarra	Outstanding Asian Star	Nominated	South Korea

=== International Song Contest: The Global Sound ===
Year	Recipient/Nominated Work	Award	Result	Host country
2017	Tidal Wave/Julie Anne San Jose (Philippines)	Silver Global Sound Award	Won	Australia

2022

=== Shorty Awards ===
Year	Recipient/Nominated Work	Award	Result	Host country
2018	Herself	YouTube Star	Nominated	United States of America

=== Top10 Asia Awards ===
Year	Nominee/Work	Award	Result	Host country
2019	Singer/Performer	Asia Music Icon Award	Won	Kuala Lumpur, Malaysia

=== Asian Television Awards ===
Year	Nominee/Work	Nominee	Result	Host country
2020	Vicky - Brgy 143 (Voice)	Best Actress in a Leading Role	Nominated	Singapore
2022	Laura Ramirez - Viu Still Series	Best Leading Female Performance-Digital	Nominated	Singapore

=== Asian Academy Creative Awards ===
Year	Nominee/Work	Nominee	Result	Host country
2023	Babaguhin Ang Buong Mundo	Best Theme Song or Title Theme (OST)	Won [National Winner]	Singapore
2025	Gemini	Best Theme Song or Title Theme (OST)	Won [National Winner]	Singapore

=== New York Festivals TV and Film Awards ===
Year	Nominee/Work	Nominee	Result	Host country
2022	Limitless Musical Trilogy - Breathe	Entertainment-Variety Special Category Silver Award	Won	United States of America

== Entertainment Awards ==
=== Gandingan Awards ===
Year	Nominee / work	Award	Result
2023	Performer/Limitless	Gandingan Ng Kababaihan	Nominated
2023	Limitless Musical Trilogy - Breathe (Tayong Dalawa)	Most Development-Oriented TV Plug	Won
2023	Limitless Musical Trilogy - Breathe	Most Development-Oriented Musical Segment/Program	Won
2023	Limitless Musical Trilogy - Breathe	Most Development-Oriented Online Video	Nominated
2025	JULIE X STELL: Ang Ating Tinig	Most Development-Oriented Musical Segment/Program	Won

=== Anak TV Seal Awards ===
Year	Nominee / work	Award	Result
2023	Herself	Female Makabata Star	Won
2023	Limitless	Anak TV Seal Awardee	Won

=== Platinum Stallion National Media Awards ===
Year	Nominee/Work	Award	Result
2025	Herself	Musical Artist Of the Year	Won

=== National Customer's Choice Achievement Awards ===
Year	Recipient/Nominated Work	Award	Result
2023	Performer/Singer	Remarkable Female Concert and Multimedia Performing Artist	Won

=== Northwest Samar State University Students' Choice Awards for Radio and Television ===
Year	Recipient/Nominated Work	Award	Result
2023	Clash Master (The Clash)	Best Musical Reality Show Host	Won
2024	Clash Master (The Clash)	Best Musical Reality Show Host	Won

=== Philippine Pop Awards ===
Year	Recipient/Nominated Work	Award	Result
2019	Herself	Female Pop Artist of the Year	Won

=== FAMAS Awards ===
Year	Nominee / work	Award	Result
2012	Herself	German Moreno Youth Achievement Award	Recipient
2018	Herself	German Moreno Youth Achievement Award	Recipient

=== SE Asian Premier Business and Achiever Award ===
Year	Recipient/Nominated Work	Award	Result
2023	Herself	Inspiring Singer Of The Year	Won

=== PMPC Star Awards for Television ===
Year	Nominee / work	Award	Result
2015	Day Off	Best Reality Show Host with Dasuri Choi, Maey Bautista, Mike "Pekto" Nacua, Boobay	Nominated
2023	The Clash	Best Talent Search Program Host with Rayver Cruz	Won
2024	All Out Sundays	Best Female TV Host	Nominated
2025	The Clash	Best Talent Search Program Host with Rayver Cruz	Won
2025	Herself	Female Shining Personality of the Night	Won

=== Golden Screen TV Awards ===
Year	Nominee / work	Award	Result
2011	Andres de Saya	Outstanding Breakthrough Performance by an Actress	Nominated

=== Guillermo Mendoza Memorial Scholarship Foundation Box Office Entertainment Awards ===
Year	Nominee / work	Award	Result
2011	Herself	Most Promising Loveteam of 2011 with Elmo Magalona	Won
2012	Julie Anne San Jose (Debut Album)	Most Promising Singer	Won

=== EdukCircle Awards ===
Year	Nominee / work	Award	Result
2019	Studio 7	Best Female Variety Show Host	Nominated
2019	Herself	Best Musical Artist Of The Year	Nominated
2019	The Sweetheart and The Balladeer	Three Most influential Concert Performs of The Year (with Christian Bautista)	Nominated

=== TAG Awards ===
Year	Nominee / work	Award	Result
2022	Maria Clara at Ibarra	Best Supporting Actress	Nominated
2024	JulieVer	Best LoveTeam (Bronze)	Won

=== Gawad Lasallianeta ===
Year	Nominee / work	Award	Result
2022	Maria Clara at Ibarra	Most Outstanding Actress in a Drama series	Nominated
2022	The Clash	Most Outstanding Female Entertainment Show Host	Nominated
2022	Maria Clara at Ibarra	Most Outstanding Teleserye	Nominated

=== Philippine Walk Of Fame ===
Year	Nominee / work	Award	Result
2015	Herself	Walk Of Fame Star Awardee	Recipient

=== YouTube Creator Awards ===
Year	Nominee / work	Award	Result
2019	100,000 YouTube Subscribers (Aybutchikik)	The Silver Creator Award	Won

=== Inside Showbiz Awards ===
Year	Nominee / work	Award	Result
2019	BreakThrough Album	Favorite Album	Won

=== USTv Awards ===
Year	Nominee / work	Award	Result
2012	I'll Be There	Best Local Video Artist	Won
2016	Herself	Social Media Personality	Nominated

=== Yahoo Philippines OMG! Award ===
Year	Nominee / work	Award	Result
2012	Herself	Female Performer of the Year	Nominated
2013	Herself	Female Performer of the Year	Won
2013	Julielmo	Fan Club of the Year with Elmo Magalona	Won
2014	Herself	Female Performer of the Year	Nominated
2014	Bakit Ngayon	Song of the Year	Won

=== The Philippine Quill Awards ===
Year	Nominee / work	Award	Result
2014	Herself	What A Wonderful World Music Video	Won
2014	Herself	The Philippine Student Quill Merit Awardee	Won

=== Globe Tatt Awards ===
Year	Nominee / work	Award	Result
2012	Herself	ThoughtMover	Nominated
2012	Herself	Trending Personality	Won
2012	Herself	People Choice Award	Won

=== Spinnr Hitlist Award ===
Year	Nominee / work	Award	Result
2014	Herself	Best Indie Artist	Won

=== UE Gawad Lualhati Awards ===
Year	Nominee / work	Award	Result
2014	Herself	Inspiring Artist Of The Year	Won

=== Catholic Mass Media Awards ===
Year	Nominee / work	Award	Result
2014	Pagbangon	Best Secular Song	Won
2022	Limitless	Best Digital Add - Public Service	Won

=== PEP List Choice Awards ===
Year	Nominee / work	Award	Result
2014	Herself	Female Teen Star of the Year	Won

=== GMA Gala Night ===
Year	Nominee / work	Award	Result
2023	JulieVer	Sparkling Loveteam of the Night	Won
2024	JulieVer	Couple of the Night	Won

=== Sparkle Spell Ball ===
Year	Nominee / work	Award	Result
2023	JulieVer as Daphne&Fred	Most Fabulous Couple of the Night	Won

=== MEG Top Choice Awards ===
Year	Nominee / work	Award	Result
2012	Herself	Twitter Trendsetter of the Year	Won

=== Candy Mag Style Awards ===
Year	Nominee / work	Award	Result
2012	Herself	Most Stylish Awards	Won

=== GMAAC Workshop Recognition ===
Year	Nominee / work	Award	Result
2012	Herself	The Host Of the Most Award	Won

=== SAS Stand Out Awards ===
Year	Nominee / work	Award	Result
2012	Herself	Viewer Choice Best Artist	Won

=== Organisasyon ng Pilipinong Mang-aawit (OPM) ===
Year	Nominee / work	Award	Result
2013	Herself	Junior Ambassador	Recipient

=== ASEAN Excellence Achievers Awards ===
Year	Nominee / work	Award	Result
2022	Herself	Versatile Actress of the Year	Won

=== Rawr Awards ===
Year	Nominee / work	Award	Result
2022	Herself	Favorite Performer	TBA
2022	Maria Clara At Ibarra	Bet na Bet na Teleserye	TBA

=== Philippines Finest Business Awards And Outstanding Achievers ===
Year	Nominee/Work	Award	Result
2024	Herself / Clash Master / Performer	Outstanding Performer and Host of the Year	Won

=== Gawad Dangal Filipino Awards ===
Year	Nominee / Work	Award	Result
2024	Herself / Performer	Distinct Singer - Performer Of The Year	Won

== Listicles ==
Year	Listicle	Result
2012-15	Best Selling Album In The Philippines [Julie Anne San Jose (Debut Album); Deeper]	Included
2012	ASAP 24K Gold Award	Female Artist Awardee
2013	ASAP 24K Platinum Circle Award	Female Artist Awardee
2014	ASAP 24K Gold Award	Female Artist Awardee
2014	ASAP 24K Platinum Circle Award	Female Artist Awardee
2012	Metro Magazine Hot List (Young Stars)	Included
2012	Yes Magazine Most Influential Celebrity On Social Media	Included
2012	Yes Magazine 100 Most Beautiful Stars	Newbie
2013	Yes Magazine 100 Most Beautiful Stars	Breakthrough
2014	Yes Magazine 100 Most Beautiful Stars	Groovers
2015	Yes Magazine 100 Most Beautiful Stars	Multihyphenate
2016	Yes Magazine 100 Most Beautiful Stars	Multihyphenate
2017	Yes Magazine 100 Most Beautiful Stars	Network Bets
2018	Yes Magazine 100 Most Beautiful Stars	Network Bets
2022	Tiktok: The Hitmakers - Most Viewed Artists (PH)	Rank 05
2022	Tiktok:Artists with Most New Followers	Rank 02
2024	PEP Best Bets 2024: The New Generation A-Listers	Rank 02 (Female Category)
2025	MsMojo Top 10 Greatest P-Pop Soloists of All Time	Rank 06
