= Ethel Booba =

Filipino actress

- Born: Ethyl Cayoca Gabison; December 17, 1976 (age 49); General Santos, Philippines
- Occupations: Actress, comedian, author, singer
- Years active: 2001–present

Ethyl Cayoca Gabison (born December 17, 1976), known professionally as Ethel Booba, is a Filipina TV personality, author, singer, and comedian. She has also worked in the recording industry. She was the first to be crowned as the celebrity champion of Tawag ng Tanghalan, which is part of the noontime television show It's Showtime.

== Career ==
Gabison is a former talent of GMA Network and was one of the hosts of Extra Challenge. She also guest judged for Kakaibang Idol, a special edition of Philippine Idol.

Before becoming a star, she joined the singing contest of ABC, Sing Galing. She defended her title for four weeks and wore glamorous outfits each week. After winning the title and being held the grand champion, she signed a contract under GMA Network. She also became one of the housemates of Pinoy Big Brother Celebrity Edition 2. She currently makes several appearances on ABS-CBN.

On September 18, 2016, Gabison launched her first book titled #Charotism: The Wit and Wisdom of Ethel Booba at the SMX Convention Center, SM Mall of Asia; it was published by VRJ Books Publishing.

== Filmography ==
=== Television ===
Year	Title	Role
2002	Sing Galing!	Herself / Grand Champion
2003	Whattamen	Herself / Guest
2003–2004	All Together Now	Joey
2003	Magpakailanman: Mare, Pare, I Love You	
2003–2006	Extra Challenge	Herself / Host
2004	Magpakailanman: May Kapalit ang Bawat Halakhak	Herself / Life Story
2005	Bubble Gang's Extra Challenge Episode	Herself / Guest
2005–2006	Show ko, Pasiklaban ng Bayan	Herself / Guest
2006	Jolog's Guide	Herself / Host
2006	Homeboy	Herself / Guest
2006	Komiks Presents: Da Adventures of Pedro Penduko	Anggitay
2007	Ysabella	Darna
2007	Pinoy Big Brother: Celebrity Edition 2	Herself / Guest
2008	Wowowee	Herself / Guest
2009	Talentadong Pinoy	Herself / Guest Judge
2011	Showtime	Herself / Guest Hurado
2011	Face to Face	Herself / Guest
2012	Gandang Gabi, Vice!	Herself / Guest
2013	Wowowillie	Herself / Co-Host
2013	Boracay Bodies	"Diva" / Grand Winner
2016	It's Showtime	Herself / Celebrity Player (Trabahula segment)
2016	Gandang Gabi, Vice!	Herself / Guest
2016	#LIKE	Herself / Celebrity Guest
2016	KMJS 12	Herself / Featured Guest
2016	Tonight with Boy Abunda	Herself / Guest
2016	Minute to Win It: Last Man Standing	Herself / Celebrity Player
2017	Dear Uge: Remedya Noche	Sandra
2017	Road Trip	Herself / Guest
2019	Tawag ng Tanghalan: Celebrity Champions	Herself / Grand Winner
2021–2022; 2025–2026	Sing Galing!	Herself / Judge (Jukeboss)
2022	Lakwatsika	Herself / Host
2024	Rainbow Rumble	Herself / Contestant

=== Film ===
Year	Title	Role
2005	Sablay Ka Na, Pasaway Ka Pa	Becky
2006	Mano Po 5: Gua Ai Di	Baday
2007	My Kuya's Wedding	Susie
2014	The Amazing Praybeyt Benjamin	Cameo role

== Bibliography ==
Year	Title
2016	#Charotism: The Wit and Wisdom of Ethel Booba

== Awards and nominations ==
Year	Award	Category	Work	Result
2004	18th PMPC Star Awards for TV	Best Comedy Actress	All Together Now (GMA-7)	Nominated
2004	18th PMPC Star Awards for TV	Best Reality Competition Program Host (with Phoemela Barranda and Paolo Bediones)	Extra Challenge (GMA-7)	Won
2005	19th PMPC Star Awards for TV	Best Reality Competition Program Host (with Paolo Bediones)	Extra Challenge (GMA-7)	Won
2006	20th PMPC Star Awards for TV	Best Reality Competition Program Host (with Paolo Bediones)	Extra Challenge (GMA-7)	Won
2006	20th PMPC Star Awards for TV	Female Star of the Night	N/A	Won
