= Ysabella =

- Title card
- Genre: Drama; Comedy; Romance; Cooking
- Directed by: Rory B. Quintos; Don M. Cuaresma; Cathy Garcia-Molina
- Starring: Judy Ann Santos; Coney Reyes; Ryan Agoncillo; Derek Ramsay
- Theme music composer: Ogie Alcasid
- Opening theme: "Huwag Mong Iwan Ang Puso" by Yeng Constantino
- Country of origin: Philippines
- Original language: Filipino
- No. of seasons: 2
- No. of episodes: 142

Production
- Executive producers: Carlo Katigbak; Cory Vidanes; Laurenti Dyogi; Malou Santos
- Producer: Des M. De Guzman-Tanwangco
- Running time: 25-35 minutes
- Production company: Star Creatives

Original release
- Network: ABS-CBN
- Release: June 25, 2007 – January 18, 2008

Ysabella is a Philippine television drama series broadcast by ABS-CBN. Directed by Rory B. Quintos, Don M. Cuaresma and Cathy Garcia-Molina, starring Judy Ann Santos, Coney Reyes, Ryan Agoncillo and Derek Ramsay. It aired on the network's Primetime Bida line up and worldwide on TFC from June 25, 2007 to January 18, 2008, replacing Maria Flordeluna and was replaced by Palos in the following week. The series is streaming online on YouTube.

Santos and Agoncillo were both reunited since Kasal, Kasali, Kasalo was released on December 25, 2006 six months later followed by its sequel Sakal, Sakali, Saklolo, which was also released on December 25 of that year.

== Synopsis ==
The story revolves around a young cook named Ysabella Cuenca. At an early age, Ysabella develops an inclination for cooking, and dreams of becoming a great cook like her mother, Rosario Cuenca.

However, her mother's misfortune causes Ysabella to taste the bitterness of life. This teaches her to be meticulous and devoted to her cooking; and cynical when it comes to love. She grows with one goal in mind—to be the best cook in their area and exact revenge on the woman who was responsible for her mother's misery.

== Cast ==
=== Protagonist ===
- Judy Ann Santos as Ysabella "Ysay" Cuenca- the cook who loves to cook. In her kitchen, she looks like a queen who has everything she cooks well. So she is a bit weak when it comes to love. Ysay and Victoria are leading a culinary competition for a one hundred million dollar contract for Prince Hugo to franchise the best Chicken Inasal recipe worldwide for the rightful chicken roast recipe internationally Ysay won and Victoria had a madness of her heart.

=== Antagonist ===
- Coney Reyes as Doña Victoria Montalban-Amarillo - Top Chef of "Florencia's" and owner of the "Victoria's Corporation". However, despite her success, she almost lost everything prompting her to do anything to salvage her success. After the competition to which she lost, she sent Cristina to kill Ysay.

=== Lead cast ===
- Ryan Agoncillo as Andrew Amarillo† and Albert Amarillo†- Andrew was a man who continued his love for Ysay until his death. Albert, his twin brother, introduced himself as Andrew so that he could avenge his brother's death. Because of her love for Ysay, she told him this. Later he was shot by Cristina & dies for Ysay.
- Derek Ramsay as Mito Valenzuela- "The Sexiest Chef on TV" is Ysay's "first love." After recovering from his broken arm in [the United States], he returned to the Philippines to build Ysay's dream restaurant for her deceased mother, and to restore his former love with Ysay.

=== Main cast ===
- Gina Pareño as Trinidad "Trining" Mendoza - Ysabella's second mother who is unrelenting to establish the needs of her family. She also took charge of the Ysay's restaurant. But she died after being hit by a car while crossing in EDSA.
- Aiza Seguerra as Alex Mendoza - The closest friend of Ysay. But there is a test to test the closeness of the two. She wants Tere. But she had a boyfriend. She has a minor jealousy in him. But despite this, Tere was still don't know that Alex likes her.
- Valeen Montenegro as Lima Amarillo-Valenzuela - an obedient daughter of Victoria and the sister of Albert and Andrew, and she tasted the first love for Jordan and also focused her heart with Reno. Later she married Jordan after Reno's death.
- Aldred Gatchalian as Jordan Valenzuela - The younger brother of Mito His love is granted only to the woman she loves and that is Lima luckily, she married Lima after Reno's death
- Jason Abalos as Reno† - The mysterious man who claims Ysay as the "caretaker" Eventually, he returned to Manila to work he lima develop feelings for him but unfortunately, he died cause of brain tumor

=== Supporting cast ===
- Desiree del Valle as Cristina Mancado† - Former girlfriend of Andrew Amarillo. They have a son named "Tingloy". In the end, Cristina attempted to kill Ysay but Cristina shoots Albert while saving Ysay and she was killed by the police.
- Pokwang as Phuket - Victoria's honest right-hand. She is the only person who knows the real life of Victoria.
- Kat Alano as Georgia Rodriguez - The women love to get the what she wants even if she hurt someone.
- Jeffrey Santos as Apolinario Reyes - The attendant of the "farm" by Andrew.
- Sitti Navarro as Tere - The woman Alex wants but she has a "boyfriend".
- Lito Pimentel as Homer - Victoria's staff
- Olyn Membian as Bonnie - Lima's secretary
- Juan Rodrigo as Fernando - Victoria's love interest
- Perla Bautista as Guadalupe "Lupe" Montalban† - Victoria's mother
- Spanky Manikan† as Perry Mendoza† - Trining's husband
- Isabel Blaesi
- Benjamin Alves
- Michael Conan

=== Special participation ===
- Angelica Panganiban as Venice - The woman accidentally likes Mito.
- Rosanna Roces as Rosario Cuenca† - teach her daughter Ysay to cook. She gave less stolen recipe book with Ysay, the wick of her early death. She is married to Abdul and the mother of Ysabella.
- Mhyco Aquino as Noel - Norman's Son
- Freddie Webb as Norman† - Rosario's boyfriend
- Phoemela Baranda as herself / a reporter
- Ethel Booba as Darna - Mito's co host on his show.
- Mickey Ferriols One of the co-host of Mito
- Evangeline Pascual as Mrs. Valenzuela - Mito and Jordan's mother
- Andre Tiangco as Mr. Valenzuela - Mito and Jordan's father
- Sonny Parsons as the Barangay Chairman
- Leo Rialp as Prince Hugo
- Roderick Paulate as himself/host
- Carla Martinez as Sophia Amarillo - Victoria's sister-in-law and her enemy.
- Sharlene San Pedro as Young Alex
- Jairus Aquino as Young Andrew and Albert
- Celine Lim as Young Ysabella
- Christian Vasquez as Young Norman
- Maricel Laxa as Young Victoria
- Gardo Versoza as Young Perry
- Neri Naig as Young Lupe
- Farrah Florer as Young Sophia
- Nadia Montenegro as Young Trining
- Morissette as Duwendita

== Critical acclaim ==
- Ysabella received three nominations from the 2008 PMPC Star Awards for Television. Judy Ann Santos and Coney Reyes garnered Best Drama Actress nods while the show itself is included in the roster of Best Primetime Drama Series citations.

== Broadcast time ==
Ysabella became infamous as its timeslot was shuffled around by ABS-CBN to give way to dramas geared towards younger demographics.

- June 25-August 3 (Episodes 1-30): Monday-Friday 7:45-8:30 p.m.
- August 6-August 31 (Episodes 31-50): Monday-Friday 8:30-9:15 p.m. (to give way for Kokey)
- September 3-September 21 (Episodes 51-65): Monday-Thursday 9:15-10:00 p.m. & Friday 9:00-9:30 p.m. (to give way for Pangarap na Bituin)
- September 24-October 5 (Episodes 66-75): Monday-Thursday 9:45-10:30 & Friday 10:00-10:30 p.m. (to give way for Lastikman)
- October 8-December 7 (Episodes 76-120): Monday-Thursday 10:30-11:00 p.m. & Friday 9:30-10:00 p.m. (to give way for Pinoy Big Brother: Celebrity Edition 2)
- December 10-January 18 (Episodes 121-142): Monday-Thursday 9:45-10:30 p.m. & Friday 9:30-10:00 p.m. (to give way for Maging Sino Ka Man: Ang Pagbabalik)

== Reruns ==
The show began airing re-runs on Jeepney TV from April 19 to August 20, 2021; February 12 to September 10, 2023 and September 20, 2025 to January 25, 2026.

== See also ==
- List of programs broadcast by ABS-CBN
- List of ABS-CBN Studios original drama series
- List of programs broadcast by Jeepney TV
