= Boobay =

Filipino actor, comedian and television host

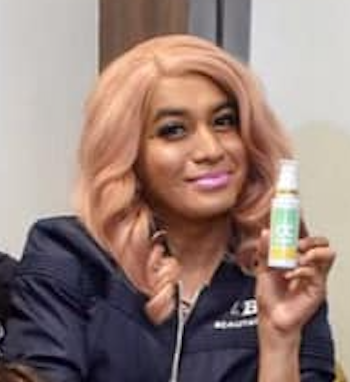
- Boobay in 2019
- Born: Norman Balbuena; November 7, 1986 (age 39); San Narciso, Zambales, Philippines
- Education: Saint Louis University (Philippines)
- Notable work: The Boobay and Tekla Show

Comedy career
- Years active: 2004–present
- Medium: Television
- Genres: Observational comedy; stand-up comedy; slapstick

Norman Balbuena (born November 7, 1986), known professionally as Boobay, is a Filipino actor, comedian and television host. He is best known for appearing in several GMA News and Public Affairs shows (including Unang Hirit) as a co-host. He was also regular in the award-winning comedy-game show Celebrity Bluff as a bluffer or gangnammm along with Edu Manzano, Brod Pete and host Eugene Domingo.

== Personal life ==
Born in the small town of San Narciso in Zambales province, Boobay is the eldest among the four children of Honorio Balbuena, a soldier, and Aquilla Balbuena, a retired elementary teacher. He was in grade school when Mount Pinatubo erupted in 1991, which caused him and his family to dwell in an evacuation site for two years after their house was destroyed by the eruption. Despite the hardships, Boobay finished grade school in Zambales. He pursued his college education at St. Louis University – Baguio, taking AB Communication, where he earned a scholarship upon joining the theater group Tanghalang SLU.

== Career ==
=== Early years ===
In 2004, Boobay first tried his luck in show business by joining GMA Network's KiliTV Comedy Hunt, a talent competition for comedians. Although he did not win the contest, he made the cut and became one of the top 15 finalists.

Seeing potential in the aspiring comedian, director Cesar Cosme called Boobay for a TV project that year. Cosme gave Balbuena the screen name “Boobay” because he thought the comedian looked like the sexy comedian Ethel Booba. After that, Boobay had several guestings in Idol Ko si Kap doing character spoofs of Rufa Mae Quinto and Ethel Booba.

After graduating, he submitted a résumé to GMA Network hoping to become a production assistant. It was Cosme who gave him his break when he was referred to become part of Takeshi's Castle with Joey de Leon and Ryan Yllana.

=== 2007–present: Comedian stints ===
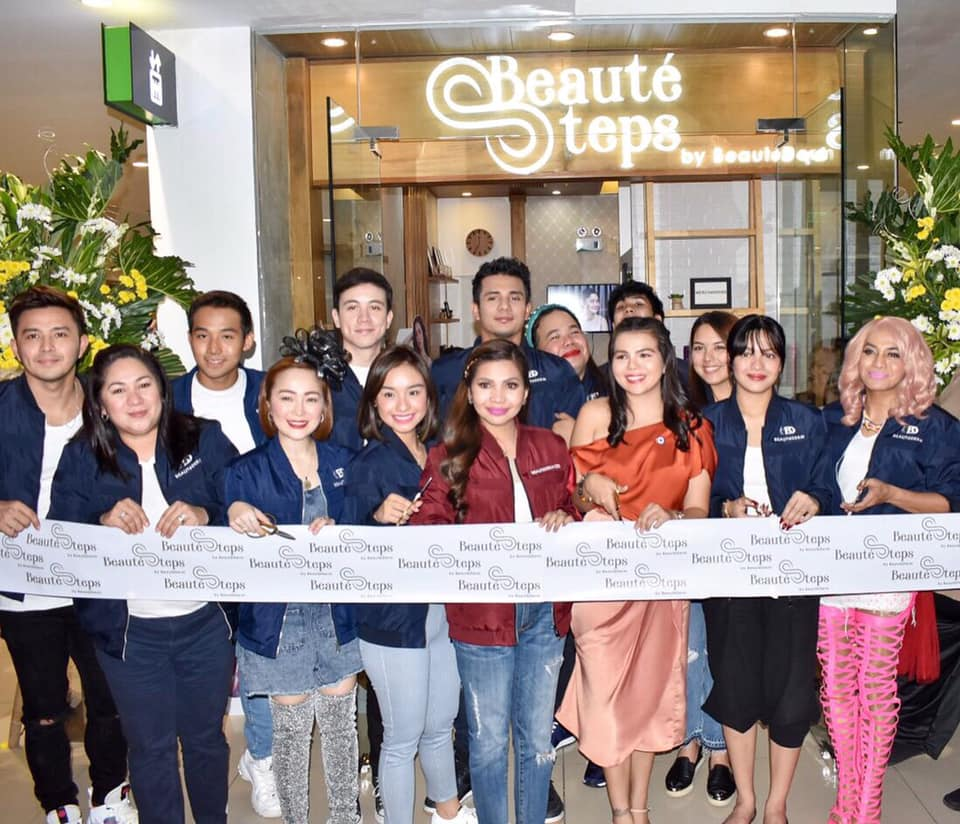
Boobay (far right) during the opening of Muntinlupa councilor Phanie Teves's store, BeautéSteps by BeautéDerm, in 2019

Boobay started his hosting stints as a Kapuso in several programs of GMA News TV. He is a recurring host in the reality-lifestyle program Day Off. Boobay was also one of the "anchors" of the satirical newscast television program May Tamang Balita with Ramon Bautista, Maey Bautista and Jinri Park where he hosted the segments "Ang Twit-twit Mo!" and "Bulag na Katotohanan" alongside Maey.

In 2012, Boobay was picked as one of the three major hosts of the new season of Extra Challenge along Marian Rivera and Richard Gutierrez. He then replaced Wally Bayola in the comedy-game show Celebrity Bluff as a "bluffer" or known as celebrity gangnammm in 2013.

It was in 2015 when Boobay joined the cast of Ismol Family where he played the role of Lora the Explorer, the caretaker of "The Bekiry". The same year, he voiced the character of Fulgoso in the 2015 remake of MariMar starring Megan Young and Tom Rodriguez.

Boobay starred in his very first dramatic role when he played the life story of Paul John Presado, the dubsmasher who went viral after posting his video on social media while singing in a jeepney in Magpakailanman: Ang Ganda na 'di Nakikita. It is in the same year when Boobay once again showed his acting prowess in a more serious role in Magpakailanman: Una Siyang Naging Akin with actress Glaiza de Castro.

Boobay is now a co-host of the weekly entertainment news and comedy talk show CelebriTV and a regular guest in various GMA Network and GMA News TV programs such as Kapuso Mo, Jessica Soho, AHA!, Sunday PinaSaya and others. Recently, Boobay joined the cast of Eat Bulaga's Kalyeserye as Yaya Pak, one of the four applicants of Lola Nidora's new yaya (nursemaid). In 2016, he became the co-host of Yan Ang Morning! with Marian Rivera until its cancellation on the same year, and Unang Hirit until 2018.

He is currently hosting The Boobay and Tekla Show with Super Tekla.

== Filmography ==
=== Film ===
Year	Title	Role	Notes	Ref.
2010	Si Agimat at si Enteng Kabisote	Market Vendor	Cameo role	
2012	Madaling Araw, Mahabang Gabi	—N/a	Supporting role	
2016	Laut	Kadapi	Supporting role	
2022	Broken Blooms	Buday	Supporting role	

=== Television ===
==== Television series ====
Year	Title	Role	Notes	Ref.
2004	KiliTV Comedy Hunt	Himself	Finalist	
2007–2008	Takeshi's Castle	Himself	Co-host	
2011–2013	May Tamang Balita	Himself	Host	
2011–2019	Day Off	Himself	Recurring co-host	
2012–2013	Extra Challenge	Himself	Co-host	
2013–2018	Celebrity Bluff	Himself	Bluffer	
2015–2016	MariMar	Voice of Fulgoso	Supporting role	
2015–2016	Ismol Family	Lora	Supporting role	
2015–2016	CelebriTV	Himself	Co-host	
2016–2017	Eat Bulaga!	Yaya Pak In Kalyeserye; Mother Goose, Quiz Vee Contestant/Lider		
2016	Yan Ang Morning!	Himself	Co-host	
2016–2018	Unang Hirit	Himself	Co-host	
2017	Full House Tonight	Himself	Performer	
2017	Road Trip	Himself	Guest	
2017	All Star Videoke	Himself	Guest/Contestant/ Defending Champion	
2018	Super Ma’am	Lovely	Guest role	
2019–present	The Boobay and Tekla Show	Himself	Main host	
2020	All-Out Sundays	Himself	Co-host	
2022	TiktoClock	Himself	Guest co-host	

==== Drama anthologies ====
Year	Title	Episode	Role	Ref.
2014	Wagas	A Transgender Love	Vonda	
2015	Karelasyon	Sugar Daddy	Venus	
2015	Dangwa	Sleeping Beauty	Tribe leader	
2015	Magpakailanman	The Paul John Presado Story: Ang Ganda na 'Di Nakikita	Paul John	
2015	Magpakailanman	Una Siyang Naging Akin	Dennis	
2016	Dear Uge	Soap Opera Sisters	Janna	
2017	Daig Kayo ng Lola Ko	Ang Pagong at Matshing	Matshing	
2019	Magpakailanman	Kung Hindi ka Magiging Akin	Genesis	
2024	Magpakailanman	Taylor Made Success	Taylor Sheesh	

== Accolades ==
Year	Film award / Critics	Recipient / Nominated work	Award	Result	Ref.
2013	Aliw Awards	Himself	Best Stand-up Comedian	Nominated	
2013	PMPC Star Awards for Television	Extra Challenge	Best Reality Program Host/s (with the hosts of Extra Challenge)	Nominated	
2014	PMPC Star Awards for Television	AHA!	Best Educational Program Host/s (with Drew Arellano)	Nominated	
2015	Aliw Awards	Himself	Best Stand-up Comedian	Nominated	
2015	PMPC Star Awards for Television	Day Off	Best Reality Program Host/s (with the hosts of Day Off)	Nominated	
2021	Best Choice Awards	The Boobay and Tekla Show	Most Outstanding Stand Up Comedian	Won	
