= Teka Mona! =

- Genre: Sketch comedy
- Created by: Associated Broadcasting Company
- Starring: Joey de Leon; Mike Nacua
- Country of origin: Philippines
- Original language: Filipino

Production
- Running time: 1 hour

Original release
- Network: ABC 5
- Release: July 29, 2006 – May 19, 2007

Teka Mona! is a Philippine television sketch comedy show broadcast by ABC. Hosted by Joey de Leon and Mike Nacua, it aired from July 29, 2006, to May 19, 2007, replacing Wow Maling Mali and was replaced by Wow Mali Express.

== Format ==
Teka Mona!, a play on the Tagalog phrase teka muna (transl. "wait a minute") and the painting Mona Lisa, features skits and sketches are performed in a manner similar to other variety shows, singing before the show ends, and comedy sequels.

== Personalities ==
- Joey de Leon
- Mike Nacua
- Alyssa Alano
- Andrew Schimmer
- Coco Martin
- Madz Aguilar

== Comedy segments ==
- News Pollution: Balita Ngayon, Bukas Itatapon - (English: News Pollution: News Today, Trash Tomorrow) It features news anchored by Susan Velasquez (Joey de Leon), a combined name of GMA reporter Susan Enriquez and ABS-CBN correspondent Tony Velasquez, and reported by Mike Kuliling (Mike Nacua) & Kissmee Bark Lee (Alyssa Alano).
- The Dirty Old Man - A segment with Filipino stories told by George Kulani (Joey De Leon), called by the Americans as George Clooney. Their topic is Alakubana, which means Alam kung bakit na.
- Ang Daming Daan - (English: The Many Paths/The Many Ways/There Are Many Hundred Peso bills) A parody of a popular religious program, Ang Dating Daan, interpreting some things. It is hosted by Bro. Elvis Soriano (Joey De Leon), a combined name of American singer Elvis Presley and Ang Dating Daan televangelist Eli Soriano, and Brother Hud (Mike Nacua), a pun to the word "brotherhood" and a direct parody of Judas Iscariot. Every time a person asks a question, he/she would pay ₱100 (equivalent to ₱167.57 in 2021).

== Awards ==
Year	Award-Giving Body	Category	Recipient	Result
2007	21st Star Awards for TV	Best Gag Show	Teka Mona!	Nominated

== See also ==
- List of TV5 (Philippine TV network) original programming
- List of Philippine television shows
