= Magkaibang Mundo =

2016 Philippine television drama series

- Title card
- Also known as: My Secret Love
- Genre: Drama; Romantic fantasy
- Created by: Pam Miras
- Written by: Geng Delgaldo; Pam Miras; Paul Sta. Ana
- Directed by: Mark Sicat dela Cruz
- Creative director: Roy Iglesias
- Starring: Louise delos Reyes; Juancho Triviño
- Narrated by: Louise delos Reyes as Princess
- Theme music composer: Raphael Calicdan
- Opening theme: "Magkaibang Mundo" by Maricris Garcia and Ralph King
- Country of origin: Philippines
- Original language: Tagalog
- No. of episodes: 84 (list of episodes)

Production
- Executive producer: Arlene D. Pilapil
- Production locations: Quezon City, Philippines
- Cinematography: Apollo Vallega Anao
- Editors: Dic Lavastida; Robert "Mateo-Do" Reyes
- Camera setup: Multiple-camera setup
- Running time: 20–32 minutes
- Production company: GMA Entertainment TV

Original release
- Network: GMA Network
- Release: May 23 – September 16, 2016

Magkaibang Mundo (transl. different world / international title: My Secret Love) is a 2016 Philippine television drama romance fantasy series broadcast by GMA Network. Directed by Mark Sicat dela Cruz, it stars Louise delos Reyes and Juancho Triviño. It premiered on May 23, 2016 on the network's Afternoon Prime line up. The series concluded on September 16, 2016, with a total of 84 episodes.

The series is streaming online on YouTube.

== Premise ==
Princess comes from a prosperous and loving family. When her father dies during an accident, her family lost their wealth and Princess is left isolated by her relatives. She eventually meets an elf, Elfino where she finds comfort in him and their friendship starts.

== Cast and characters ==
Cast

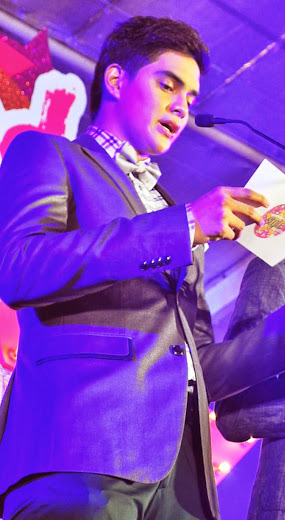
Juancho Triviño

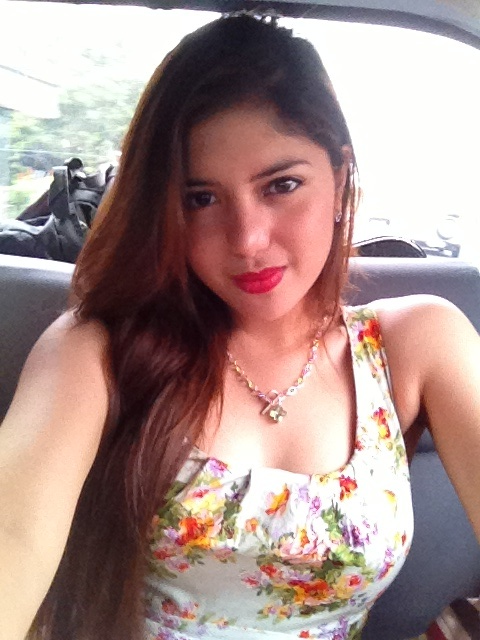
Isabelle de Leon

Lead cast

- Louise delos Reyes as Princess "Pepay" Santos Sandoval-Cruz
- Juancho Triviño as Elfino / Ellias "Inoy" Cruz

Supporting cast

- Assunta De Rossi as Amanda "Felly" Santos-Sandoval
- Gina Alajar as Noreen Sandoval-Perez
- Rez Cortez as Jonathan "Jojo" Perez
- Maricar de Mesa as Criselda Dizon
- Ana Capri as Barang
- Isabelle de Leon as Sophia "Sofie" Sandoval Perez
- Mike "Pekto" Nacua as Bombi
- Liezel Lopez as Analyn Sandoval Perez
- Marika Sasaki as Maria Felicia "Maffy" Payongayong
- Balang as Dino

Guest cast

- Kim Belles as younger Princess
- Jan Michael Patricio Andres as younger Elfino
- Althea Ablan as younger Sofie
- Dion Ignacio as Jeffrey Dizon
- Geraldine Villamil as Dahlia
- Frances Makil-Ignacio as Celia
- Jhoana Marie Tan as Bito
- Lucho Ayala as Ricky
- Gabby Eigenmann as Ruben Sandoval
- Jaime Fabregas as a judge
- Sheila Marie Rodriguez as Aileen
- Chrome Cosio as Serge
- Carme Sanchez as Marang
- Lui Manansala as Biring

== Production ==
Principal photography commenced in April 2016.

== Ratings ==
According to AGB Nielsen Philippines' Mega Manila household television ratings, the pilot episode of Magkaibang Mundo earned a 15.8% rating. The final episode also scored a 15.8% rating.
