= All Together Now (Philippine TV series) =

Philippine television sitcom series

- Title card
- Genre: Sitcom
- Created by: Edgar Mortiz; Joseph Balboa
- Written by: Dan Salamante
- Directed by: Al Quinn
- Starring: Christopher de Leon; Johnny Delgado; Edgar Mortiz; Pops Fernandez
- Opening theme: "All Together Now" by Christopher de Leon, Johnny Delgado, Edgar Mortiz and Pops Fernandez
- Country of origin: Philippines
- Original language: Tagalog
- No. of episodes: 47

Production
- Camera setup: Multiple-camera setup
- Running time: 28–60 minutes
- Production company: GMA Entertainment TV

Original release
- Network: GMA Network
- Release: October 21, 2003 – September 7, 2004

All Together Now is a Philippine television sitcom series broadcast by GMA Network. Directed by Al Quinn, it stars Christopher de Leon, Johnny Delgado, Edgar Mortiz and Pops Fernandez. It premiered on October 21, 2003 on the network's KiliTV line up. The series concluded on September 7, 2004, with a total of 47 episodes.

The series is streaming online on YouTube.

== Cast and characters ==
Cast

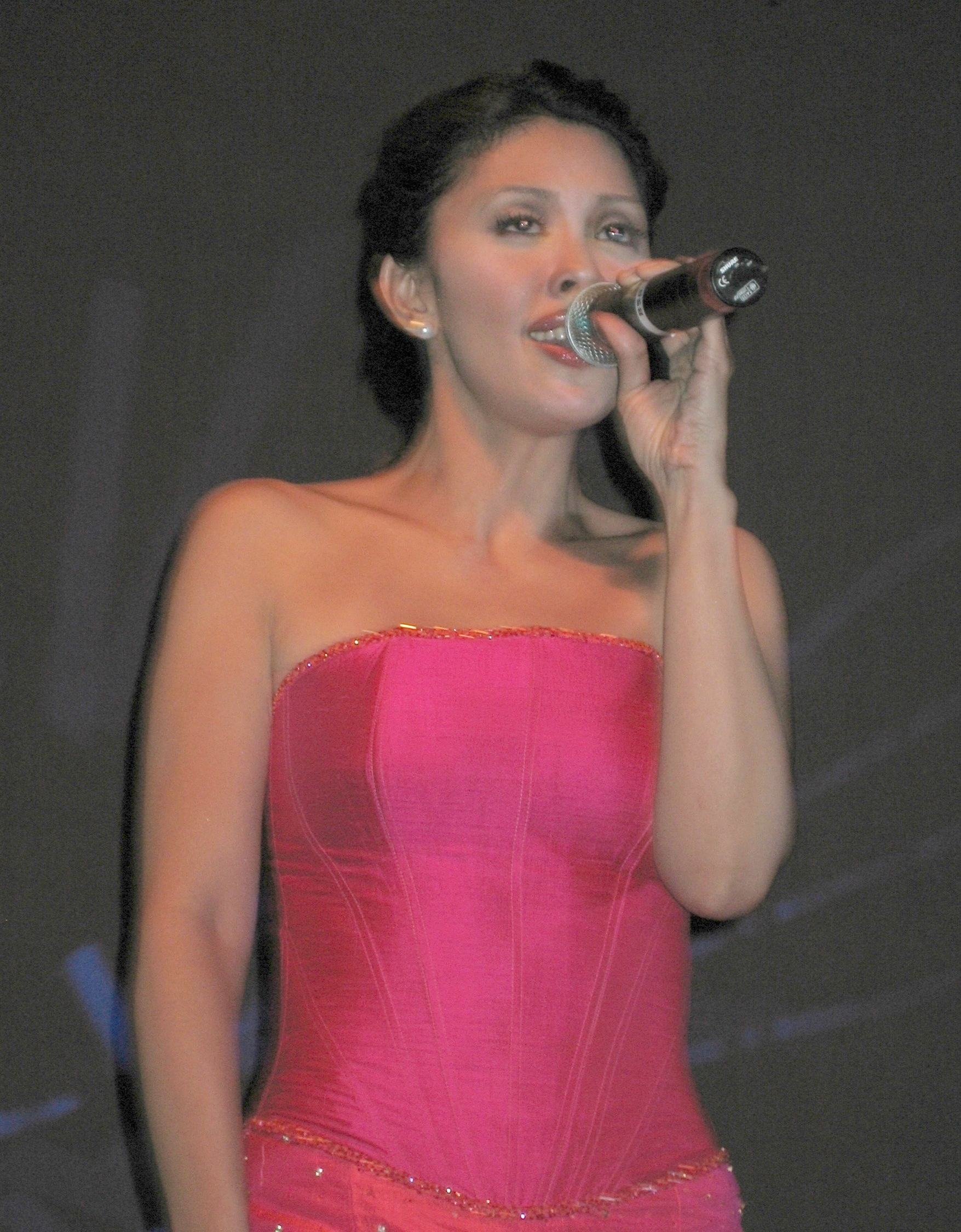
Pops Fernandez

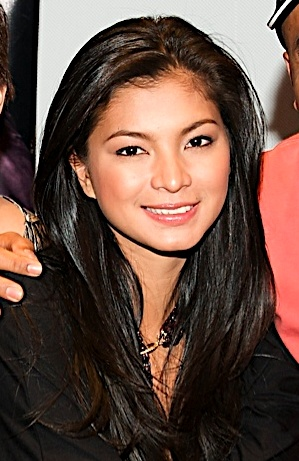
Angel Locsin

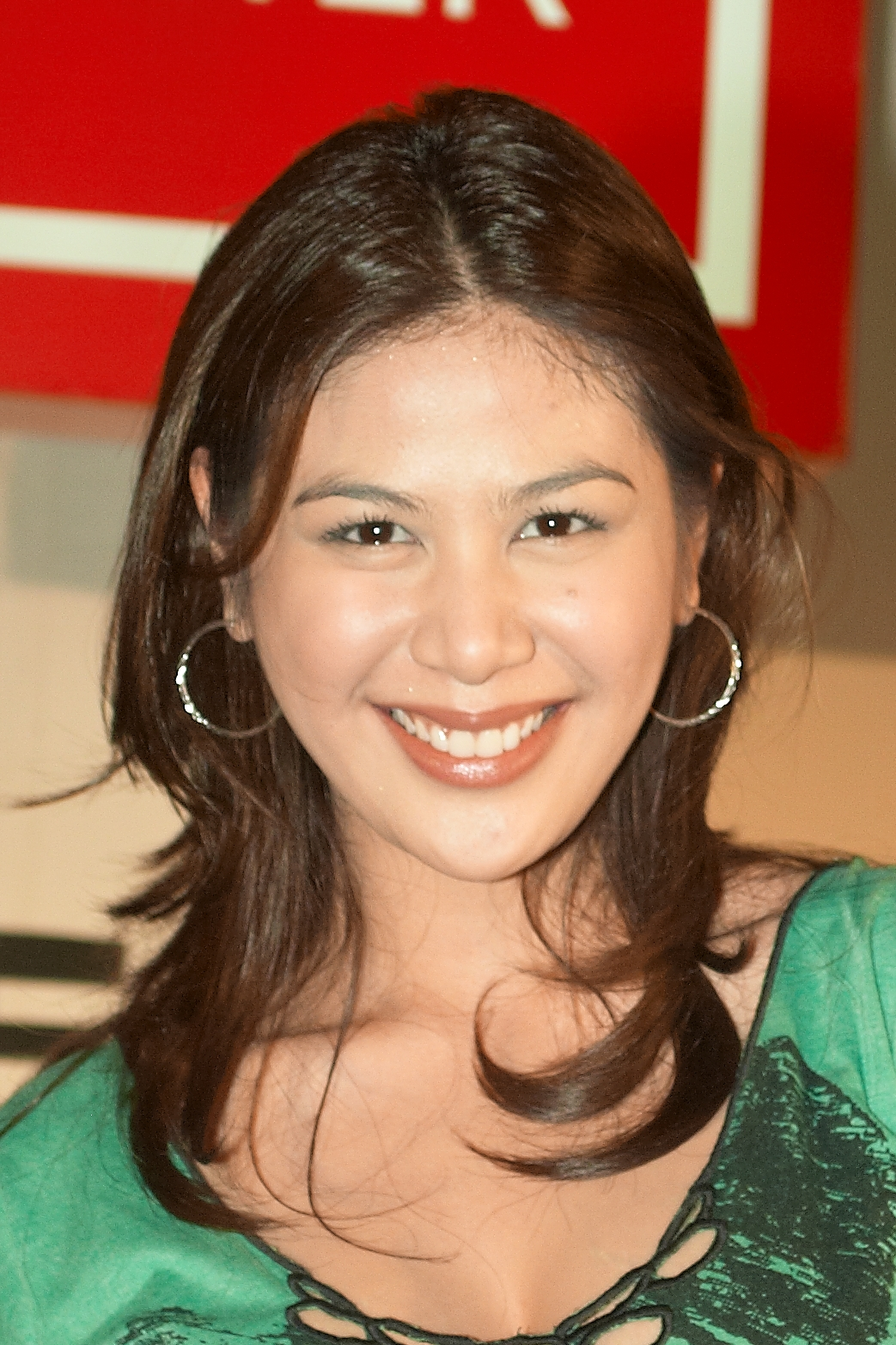
Valerie Concepcion

Lead cast

- Christopher de Leon as DJ Blue / Tong
- Johnny Delgado as Mamboy
- Edgar Mortiz as Edgie
- Pops Fernandez as Rina

Supporting cast

- Angel Locsin as Tetet
- K Brosas as Kakai
- Sherilyn Reyes as LL
- Ethel Booba as Joey
- Alicia Mayer
- Francine Prieto
- Railey Valeroso
- Drew Arellano as Andrew
- Maggie Wilson
- Valerie Concepcion
- Gary Lim
- Gene Padilla
- Alma Moreno as Tudis
- Contin Roque as Contin
