= Yan ang Morning! =

2016 Philippine television talk show

- Title card
- Genre: Talk show
- Written by: Yani Bautista; Venj Pellena; Plow Ferrer
- Directed by: Louie Ignacio
- Presented by: Marian Rivera
- Opening theme: "Yan ang Morning!" by Hannah Precillas
- Country of origin: Philippines
- Original language: Tagalog
- No. of episodes: 74

Production
- Executive producer: Paul Lester Chia
- Camera setup: Multiple-camera setup
- Running time: 19–29 minutes
- Production company: GMA Entertainment TV

Original release
- Network: GMA Network
- Release: May 2 – August 12, 2016

Yan ang Morning! (transl. that's the morning!) is a 2016 Philippine television talk show broadcast by GMA Network. Directed by Louie Ignacio, it is hosted by Marian Rivera. It premiered on May 2, 2016 on the network's morning line up. The show concluded on August 12, 2016, with a total of 74 episodes.

The show is streaming online on YouTube.

== Hosts ==
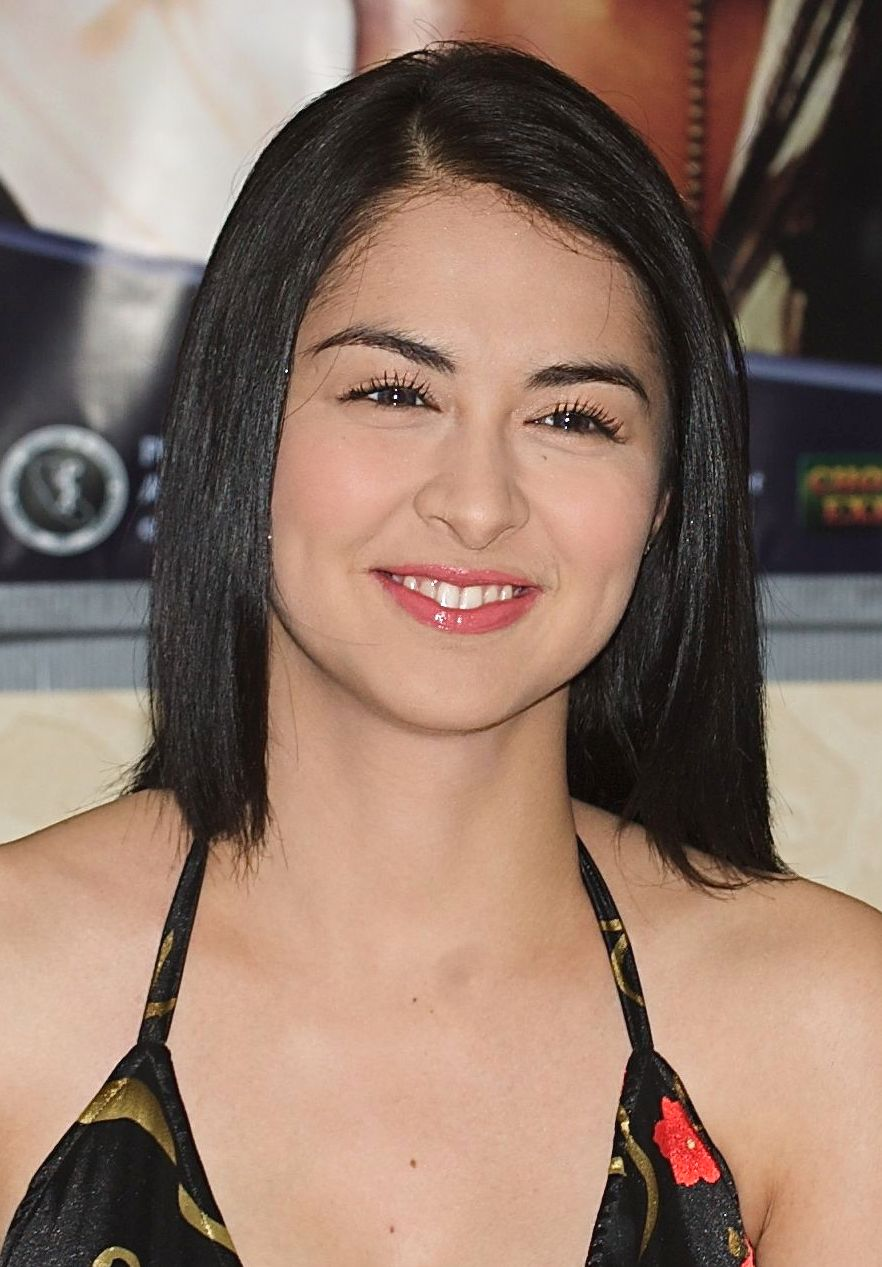
Marian Rivera served as a host.

- Marian Rivera
- Boobay

== Ratings ==
According to AGB Nielsen Philippines' Mega Manila household television ratings, the pilot episode of Yan ang Morning! earned an 11.8% rating. The final episode scored an 8.6% rating in Urban Luzon television ratings.
