= Marimar (2015 TV series) =

Philippine television drama series

- Title card
- Genre: Romantic drama
- Based on: Marimar (1994) by Inés Rodena
- Written by: Des Garbes-Severino; Lobert Villela; Roan Lean Sales
- Directed by: Dominic Zapata; Mark Dela Cruz; Lore Reyes
- Creative director: Roy C. Iglesias
- Starring: Megan Young; Tom Rodriguez
- Voices of: Boobay as Fulgoso
- Theme music composer: Tata Betita
- Opening theme: "Marimar" by Hannah Precillas
- Country of origin: Philippines
- Original language: Tagalog
- No. of episodes: 100

Production
- Executive producer: Carolyn B. Galve
- Producer: Aeris Libanan-Tobias
- Production locations: Bataan; Batangas; Metro Manila; Zambales
- Cinematography: Roman Theodossis
- Editors: Robert Pancho; Donard Robles; Kheem Badayos
- Camera setup: Multiple-camera setup
- Running time: 45 minutes
- Production company: GMA Entertainment TV

Original release
- Network: GMA Network
- Release: August 24, 2015 – January 8, 2016

Related
- Marimar (2007)

Marimar is a Philippine television drama romance series broadcast by GMA Network. The series is based on a 1994 Mexican television series of the same title. Directed by Dominic Zapata, Mark Dela Cruz and Lore Reyes, it stars Megan Young in the title role and Tom Rodriguez. It premiered on August 24, 2015 on the network's Telebabad line up. The series concluded on January 8, 2016, with a total of 100 episodes.

== Premise ==
Marimar is a poor girl who marries a rich heir, Sergio. Sergio's stepmother Angelika and ex-girlfriend Antonia makes Marimar's life a "living hell". A few years later, Marimar meets her wealthy biological father, Gustavo Aldama, who helps her get revenge against the people who wronged her.

== Cast and characters ==
Cast

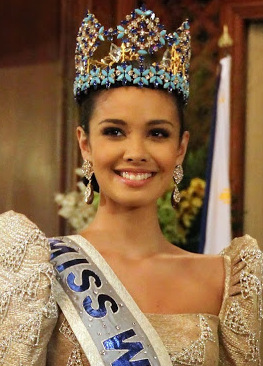
Megan Young

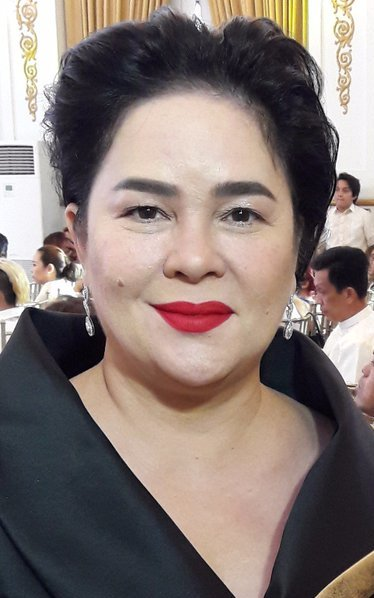
Jaclyn Jose

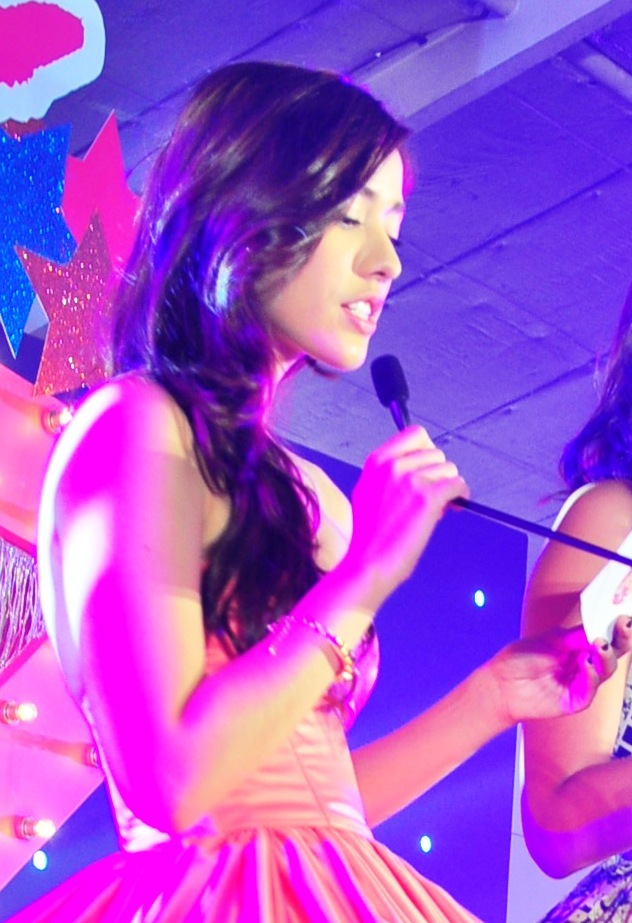
Lauren Young

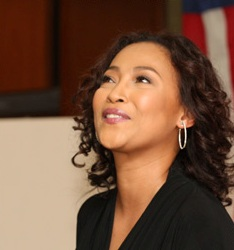
Jaya

Lead cast

- Megan Young as Marimar Pérez-Santibañez / Bella Aldama-Santibañez
- Tom Rodriguez as Sergio Santibañez

Supporting cast

- Jaclyn Jose as Angelika Santibañez
- Lauren Young as Antonia Santibañez
- Alice Dixson as Mia Corcuera-Aldama
- Zoren Legaspi as Gustavo Aldama
- Ina Raymundo as Brenda Guillermo
- Carmi Martin as Tía Esperanza Corcuera
- Ricardo Cepeda as Renato Santibañez
- Cris Villanueva as Sito Porres
- Dion Ignacio as Nicandro Mejía
- Jaya Ramsey as Tía Corazón
- Candy Pangilinan as Tía Perfecta
- Boobay as Fulgoso's voice
- Princess as Fulgoso
- Ashley Cabrera as Cruzita A. Santibañez
- Zach Briz as Panchito A. Santibañez

Recurring cast

- Diva Montelaba as Kendra Dela Paz
- Princess Snell as Aurora Santibañez
- James Blanco as Rodolfo San Jinez
- Solenn Heussaff as Capuccina Blanchett
- Maricris Garcia as Natalia Montenegro
- Diana Zubiri as Julianna Corcuera-Aldama
- Mikoy Morales as Choi del Castillo
- Rita Iringan as Vanessa Mejia
- LJ Reyes as Inocencia Corcuera-Arcega
- Carlene Aguilar as Gilma "Gema" Cascavel
- Arny Ross as Amale Zamora / fake Bella
- Alicia Mayer as Adina San Jose
- Glenda Garcia as Gracia Zamora
- Iwa Moto as Magda Evangelista
- Frank Magalona as Franco Santibañez
- Shey Reyes as Carinda Corcuera
- Jess Lapid as Ramon
- Pekto as Eliong

Guest cast

- Vincent Magbanua as younger Choi
- Lito Legaspi as Fernando Aldama
- Baby O'Brien as Lupita Aldama
- Nova Villa as Cruz Pérez
- Tommy Abuel as Pancho Pérez
- Annalie Forbes as Maricar
- Hazel Dio as teenage Marimar
- Elijah Alejo as younger Marimar
- Barbara Miguel as younger Amale
- Almira Muhlach as Ysabel Santibañez
- Beatriz Imperial as Katja Perez
- Carl Acosta as younger Sergio

== Development ==
Marimar is a 1994 Mexican television series starring Thalía broadcast by Televisa. It later aired in the Philippines on March 11, 1996 through Radio Philippines Network. In 2007, GMA Network acquired the rights to remake the series. Marian Rivera was later cast to play the title role. In June 2015, GMA Network acquired the rights to the second remake of Marimar.

== Ratings ==
Marimar ratings
Episode	Original air date	AGB Nielsen Mega Manila Households Television Homes			Ref.
Episode	Original air date	Rating	Timeslot rank	Primetime rank	Ref.
1	August 24, 2015	25.1%	#1	#1	
2	August 25, 2015	22.4%	#1	#2	
3	August 26, 2015	23.2%	#1	#1	
4	August 27, 2015	23.6%	#1	#1	
5	August 28, 2015	21.3%	#1	#2	
6	August 31, 2015	25.8%	#1	#1	
7	September 1, 2015	23.7%	#1	#1	
8	September 2, 2015	22.9%	#1	#1	
9	September 3, 2015	24.8%	#1	#1	
10	September 4, 2015	22.8%	#1	#1	
11	September 7, 2015	23.2%	#1	#1	
12	September 8, 2015	22.0%	#1	#2	
13	September 9, 2015	22.0%	#1	#1	
14	September 10, 2015	23.2%	#1	#2	
15	September 11, 2015	24.6%	#1	#2	
16	September 14, 2015	23.4%	#1	#1	
17	September 15, 2015	23.4%	#1	#1	
18	September 16, 2015	25.1%	#1	#2	
19	September 17, 2015	23.9%	#1	#2	
20	September 18, 2015	22.7%	#1	#2	
21	September 21, 2015	23.3%	#1	#2	
22	September 22, 2015	22.5%	#1	#2	
23	September 23, 2015	23.4%	#1	#3	
24	September 24, 2015	22.4%	#1	#3	
25	September 25, 2015	21.9%	#2	#4	
26	September 28, 2015	19.3%	#2	#4	
27	September 29, 2015	20.7%	#2	#4	
28	September 30, 2015	20.0%	#2	#4	
29	October 1, 2015	22.4%	#2	#4	
30	October 2, 2015	20.6%	#2	#4	
31	October 5, 2015	21.3%	#2	#4	
32	October 6, 2015	20.4%	#2	#5	
33	October 7, 2015	18.6%	#2	#6	
34	October 8, 2015	21.0%	#2	#4	
35	October 9, 2015	20.6%	#2	#5	
36	October 12, 2015	21.7%	#2	#4	
37	October 13, 2015	22.4%	#2	#4	
38	October 14, 2015	22.2%	#2	#4	
39	October 15, 2015	22.7%	#2	#3	
40	October 16, 2015	22.7%	#2	#4	
41	October 19, 2015	21.0%	#2	#4	
42	October 20, 2015	20.7%	#2	#4	
43	October 21, 2015	19.5%	#2	#4	
44	October 22, 2015	20.5%	#2	#4	
45	October 23, 2015	20.7%	#2	#4	
46	October 26, 2015	20.0%	#2	#4	
47	October 27, 2015	19.8%	#2	#4	
48	October 28, 2015	20.6%	#1	#2	
49	October 29, 2015	21.1%	#1	#2	
50	October 30, 2015	20.9%	#2	#4	
51	November 2, 2015	23.7%	#1	#2	
52	November 3, 2015	23.6%	#1	#2	
53	November 4, 2015	22.6%	#2	#3	
54	November 5, 2015	23.5%	#1	#1	
55	November 6, 2015	24.3%	#1	#1	
56	November 9, 2015	26.9%	#1	#1	
57	November 10, 2015	27.1%	#1	#1	
58	November 11, 2015	23.9%	#1	#1	
59	November 12, 2015	26.2%	#1	#1	
60	November 13, 2015	26.3%	#1	#1	
61	November 16, 2015	24.4%	#1	#1	
62	November 17, 2015	24.7%	#1	#2	
63	November 18, 2015	22.8%	#1	#3	
64	November 19, 2015	25.0%	#1	#2	
65	November 20, 2015	26.8%	#1	#1	
66	November 23, 2015	24.7%	#1	#1	
67	November 24, 2015	26.3%	#1	#1	
68	November 25, 2015	23.8%	#1	#1	
69	November 26, 2015	24.8%	#1	#1	
70	November 27, 2015	26.3%	#1	#1	
71	November 30, 2015	23.7%	#1	#2	
72	December 1, 2015	23.8%	#1	#1	
73	December 2, 2015	23.2%	#1	#3	
74	December 3, 2015	26.9%	#1	#1	
75	December 4, 2015	24.9%	#1	#1	
76	December 7, 2015	25.3%	#1	#1	
77	December 8, 2015	26.1%	#1	#1	
78	December 9, 2015	24.0%	#1	#1	
79	December 10, 2015	25.1%	#1	#1	
80	December 11, 2015	24.6%	#1	#1	
81	December 14, 2015	25.3%	#1	#2	
82	December 15, 2015	25.1%	#1	#2	
83	December 16, 2015	25.9%	#1	#1	
84	December 17, 2015	23.7%	#1	#1	
85	December 18, 2015	24.2%	#1	#2	
86	December 21, 2015	24.0%	#1	#2	
87	December 22, 2015	22.7%	#1	#3	
88	December 23, 2015	22.3%	#1	#3	
89	December 24, 2015	17.5%	#1	#4	
90	December 25, 2015	18.8%	#1	#1	
91	December 28, 2015	21.8%	#1	#3	
92	December 29, 2015	21.4%	#1	#2	
93	December 30, 2015	20.4%	#2	#4	
94	December 31, 2015	16.9%	#1	#5	
95	January 1, 2016	19.1%	#2	#4	
96	January 4, 2016	20.9%	#1	#2	
97	January 5, 2016	22.1%	#1	#1	
98	January 6, 2016	22.9%	#1	#1	
99	January 7, 2016	23.0%	#1	#1	
100	January 8, 2016	24.8%	#1	#2	

== Production ==
Principal photography commenced on July 16, 2015. Filming took place in Bataan, Batangas, Metro Manila and Zambales. Filming concluded in December 2015.
