= List of Magkaibang Mundo episodes =

Magkaibang Mundo is a 2016 Philippine television drama fantasy romance series broadcast by GMA Network. It premiered on the network's Afternoon Prime line up and worldwide on GMA Pinoy TV from May 23, 2016 to September 16, 2016, replacing Wish I May.

Mega Manila and Urban Luzon ratings are provided by AGB Nielsen Philippines.

== Series overview ==
Month	Episodes	
Month	Episodes	Monthly Averages
May 2016	7	14.7%
June 2016	21	15.8%
July 2016	21	14.6%
August 2016	23	14.6%
September 2016	12	14.6%
Total	84	14.9%

== Episodes ==
=== May 2016 ===
Episode		Original air date	Social Media Hashtag	AGB Nielsen Mega Manila Households in Television Homes			Ref.
Episode		Original air date	Social Media Hashtag	Rating	Timeslot Rank	Afternoon Rank	Ref.
1	Pilot	May 23, 2016	#MagkaibangMundo	15.8%	#1	#2	
2	Paalam Papa	May 24, 2016	#MMPaalamPapa	12.9%	#1	#4	
3	Princess at Elfino	May 25, 2016	#MMPrincessElfino	14.6%	#1	#3	
4	Lupit ni Noreen	May 26, 2016	#MMLupitNiNoreen	14.4%	#1	#4	
5	Laban, Amanda!	May 27, 2016	#MMLabanAmanda	15.6%	#1	#3	
6	Pepay na si Princess	May 30, 2016	#MMPepayNaSiPrincess	14.6%	#1	#4	
7	Kamusta Ka, Elfino?	May 31, 2016	#MMKamustaKaElfino	14.8%	#1	#5	

=== June 2016 ===
Episode		Original air date	Social Media Hashtag	AGB Nielsen Mega Manila Households in Television Homes			Ref.
Episode		Original air date	Social Media Hashtag	Rating	Timeslot Rank	Afternoon Rank	Ref.
8	Pepay Meets Jeffrey	June 1, 2016	#MMPepayMeetsJeffrey	12.6%	#1	#5	
9	Pepay to the Rescue	June 2, 2016	#MMPepayToTheRescue	15.4%	#1	#5	
10	Pretty Pepay	June 3, 2016	#MMPrettyPepay	16.5%	#1	#3	
11	Alok ni Barang	June 6, 2016	#MMAlokNiBarang	14.6%	#1	#5	
12	Upsize Elfino	June 7, 2016	#MMUpsizeElfino	15.6%	#1	#4	
13	Nasaan Ka, Pepay?	June 8, 2016	#MMNasaanKaPepay	16.7%	#1	#2	
14	Salisi	June 9, 2016	#MMSalisi	15.6%	#1	#5	
15	Elfino Balik Duwende	June 10, 2016	#MMElfinoBalikDuwende	16.1%	#1	#4	
16	Pepay's Hero	June 13, 2016	#MMPepaysHero	15.8%	#1	#2	
17	Mayamang Manliligaw	June 14, 2016	#MMMayamangManliligaw	14.7%	#1	#5	
18	Date With Pepay	June 15, 2016	#MMDateWithPepay	15.8%	#1	#4	
19	Ang Pagkikita	June 16, 2016	#MMAngPagkikita	16.1%	#1	#5	
20	Saltik ni Jeffrey	June 17, 2016	#MMSaltikNiJeffrey	16.9%	#1	#4	
21	Ang Pagtatapat	June 20, 2016	#MMAngPagtatapat	14.4%	#1	#5	
22	Sulat ni Amanda	June 21, 2016	#MMSulatNiAmanda	14.5%	#1	#5	
23	Hello, Mama!	June 22, 2016	#MMHelloMama	16.3%	#1	#5	
24	Takas	June 23, 2016	#MMTakas	15.3%	#1	#5	
25	Ang Paghahanap	June 24, 2016	#MMAngPaghahanap	17.4%	#1	#4	
26	Wanted: Amanda	June 27, 2016	#MMWantedAmanda	17.8%	#1	#4	
27	Face Off	June 28, 2016	#MMFaceOff	16.4%	#1	#4	
28	Laban, Pepay!	June 29, 2016	#MMLabanPepay	17.2%	#1	#4	

=== July 2016 ===
Episode		Original air date	Social Media Hashtag	AGB Nielsen Urban Luzon Households in Television Homes			Ref.
Episode		Original air date	Social Media Hashtag	Rating	Timeslot Rank	Afternoon Rank	Ref.
29	Tragedy	July 1, 2016 (Note: Episode 29 did not air on June 30 due to President Rodrigo Duterte's Inaugural Address live coverage.)	#MMTragedy	14.0%	#1	#5	
30	Kidnapped	July 4, 2016	#MMKidnapped	15.9%	#1	#2	
31	Trauma	July 5, 2016	#MMTrauma	14.1%	#1	#4	
32	Pepay Home	July 6, 2016	#MMPepayHome	14.6%	#1	#4	
33	Guardian	July 7, 2016	#MMGuardian	14.9%	#1	#4	
34	Mama	July 8, 2016	#MMMama	17.5%	#1	#4	
35	Engkwentro	July 11, 2016	#MMEngkwentro	14.7%	#1	#4	
36	Identity	July 12, 2016	#MMIdentity	16.9%	#1	#4	
37	Reunited	July 13, 2016	#MMReunited	15.2%	#1	#4	
38	The Breakup	July 14, 2016	#MMTheBreakUp	15.8%	#1	#4	
39	Salamat, Inoy!	July 15, 2016	#MMSalamatInoy	16.2%	#1	#3	
40	Pagtatago	July 18, 2016	#MMPagtatago	14.8%	#1	#3	
41	Duda	July 19, 2016	#MMDuda	13.8%	#1	#3	
42	The Kiss	July 20, 2016	#MMTheKiss	14.3%	#1	#3	
43	Selos ni Inoy	July 21, 2016	#MMSelosNiInoy	14.5%	#1	#2	
44	Almost Kiss	July 22, 2016	#MMAlmostKiss	14.3%	#1	#3	
45	Inoy The Hero	July 25, 2016	#MMInoyTheHero	13.8%	#1	#4	
46	Mahal Kita, Pepay!	July 26, 2016	#MMMahalKitaPepay	13.6%	#1	#3	
47	Pepay's Answer	July 27, 2016	#MMPepaysAnswer	12.9%	#2	#4	
48	The Proposal	July 28, 2016	#MMTheProposal	12.9%	#2	#4	
49	Iyak ni Inoy	July 29, 2016	#MMIyakNiInoy	12.4%	#2	#4	

=== August 2016 ===
Episode		Original air date	Social Media Hashtag	AGB Nielsen Urban Luzon Households in Television Homes			Ref.
Episode		Original air date	Social Media Hashtag	Rating	Timeslot Rank	Afternoon Rank	Ref.
50	Setup	August 1, 2016	#MMSetUp	15.8%	#1	#3	
51	Pagtakas	August 2, 2016	#MMPagtakas	14.8%	#1	#3	
52	Alone With Pepay	August 3, 2016	#MMAloneWithPepay	14.0%	#1	#3	
53	Pag-ibig na Ba?	August 4, 2016	#MMPagIbigNaBa	12.8%	#1	#3	
54	Getting Close	August 5, 2016	#MMGettingClose	13.5%	#2	#3	
55	Damdamin ni Pepay	August 8, 2016	#MMDamdaminNiPepay	13.4%	#1	#5	
56	Pagbawi kay Pepay	August 9, 2016	#MMPagbawiKayPepay	16.1%	#1	#3	
57	This is it	August 10, 2016	#MMThisIsIt	13.7%	#2	#6	
58	Gayuma	August 11, 2016	#MMGayuma	14.1%	#1	#3	
59	Nagayuma si Inoy	August 12, 2016	#MMNagayumaSiInoy	15.7%	#1	#3	
60	Inoy is Back	August 15, 2016	#MMInoyIsBack	15.6%	#1	#3	
61	Tulong kay Bito	August 16, 2016	#MMTulongKayBito	15.0%	#1	#4	
62	Rebelasyon kay Pepay	August 17, 2016	#MMRebelasyonKayPepay	15.1%	#1	#2	
63	Elfino at Inoy	August 18, 2016	#MMElfinoAtInoy	15.4%	#1	#3	
64	Pagtatanggol ni Pepay	August 19, 2016	#MMPagtatanggolNiPepay	14.8%	#2	#4	
65	Bunton ng Galit	August 22, 2016	#MMBuntonNgGalit	14.1%	#1	#4	
66	Bagong Pagsubok	August 23, 2016	#MMBagongPagsubok	13.4%	#1	#3	
67	Resbak ni Jeffrey	August 24, 2016	#MMResbakNiJeffery	15.5%	#1	#3	
68	Panganib	August 25, 2016	#MMPanganib	15.1%	#1	#3	
69	Testigo	August 26, 2016	#MMTestigo	14.4%	#1	#4	
70	Pag-asa ni Amanda	August 29, 2016	#MMPagasaNiAmanda	15.7%	#1	#3	
71	Alinlangan	August 30, 2016	#MMAlinlangan	—N/a			
72	Tuloy ang Testigo	August 31, 2016	#MMTuloyAngTestigo	14.1%	#1	#3	

=== September 2016 ===
Episode		Original air date	Social Media Hashtag	AGB Nielsen Urban Luzon Households in Television Homes			Ref.
Episode		Original air date	Social Media Hashtag	Rating	Timeslot Rank	Afternoon Rank	Ref.
73	Paglilitis	September 1, 2016	#MMPaglilitis	13.5%	#1	#4	
74	Paghihiganti	September 2, 2016	#MMPaghihiganti	13.6%	#2	#7	
75	First Date	September 5, 2016	#MMFirstDate	16.0%	#1	#3	
76	Bihag ni Barang	September 6, 2016	#MMBihagNiBarang	14.2%	#1	#3	
77	Trapped Inoy	September 7, 2016	#MMTrappedInoy	14.6%	#1	#3	
78	Pangitain	September 8, 2016	#MMPangitain	14.3%	#1	#4	
79	Harapan	September 9, 2016	#MMHarapan	15.2%	#1	#3	
80	Huling Alas	September 12, 2016	#MMHulingAlas	14.1%	#2	#4	
81	Bwelta ni Barang	September 13, 2016	#MMBweltaNiBarang	14.3%	#1	#3	
82	Halik ni Pepay	September 14, 2016	#MMHalikNiPepay	16.1%	#1	#3	
83	Sanib Pwersa	September 15, 2016	#MMSanibPwersa	14.0%	#1	#3	
84	Finale	September 16, 2016	#MMFinale	15.8%	#1	#3	
