= Extra Challenge =

Philippine television reality show

- Title card from 2012 to 2013
- Also known as: Extra, Extra (Note: 1999-2003.); Extra Challenge (Note: 2003-06.); Extra Challenge Milyonaryo (Note: 2006.); Extra Challenge Extreme (Note: 2012-13.)
- Genre: News magazine; Reality competition
- Directed by: Rico Gutierrez
- Presented by: Karen Davila; Paolo Bediones; Miriam Quiambao; Phoemela Baranda; Mariel Rodriguez; Ethel Booba; Richard Gutierrez; Marian Rivera; Boobay
- Country of origin: Philippines
- Original language: Tagalog

Production
- Executive producer: Margie Natividad
- Camera setup: Multiple-camera setup
- Running time: 22–45 minutes
- Production company: GMA News and Public Affairs

Original release
- Network: GMA Network
- Release: February 15, 1999 – January 20, 2013

Extra Challenge formerly Extra, Extra is a Philippine television news magazine and reality competition show broadcast by GMA Network. Originally hosted by Karen Davila and Paolo Bediones, it premiered on February 15, 1999, on the network's evening line up as a lifestyle show titled as Extra, Extra. In 2003, it was retitled as Extra Challenge and became a reality show. The show concluded on January 20, 2013.

== Overview ==
On February 15, 1999, Extra Extra premiered as a news magazine show with Paolo Bediones and Karen Davila serving as hosts. Miriam Quiambao replaced Davila as a co-host when she left the show in 2000.

In 2003, it was reformatted as a reality competition show and renamed as Extra Challenge. The show featured celebrities pitted against each other in several challenges. It is patterned after American reality shows such as Survivor, The Amazing Race, America's Next Top Model, Fear Factor, The Simple Life, The Bachelor and The Real Housewives. After Quiambao left in January 2004, Mariel Rodriguez, Phoemela Baranda and Ethel Booba became hosts. In 2006, the show was renamed to Extra Challenge Milyonaryo. Extra Challenge Milyonaryo concluded on May 26, 2006.

In 2012, the show returned as Extra Challenge Extreme, with Richard Gutierrez, Marian Rivera and Boobay serving as the hosts.

== Hosts ==
Hosts

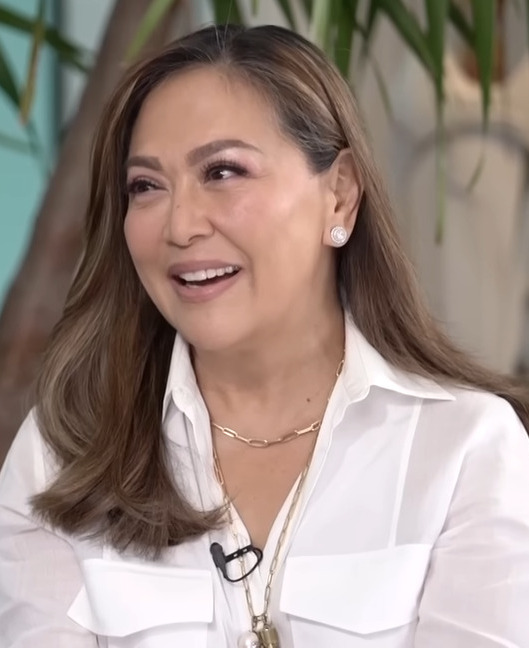
Karen Davila

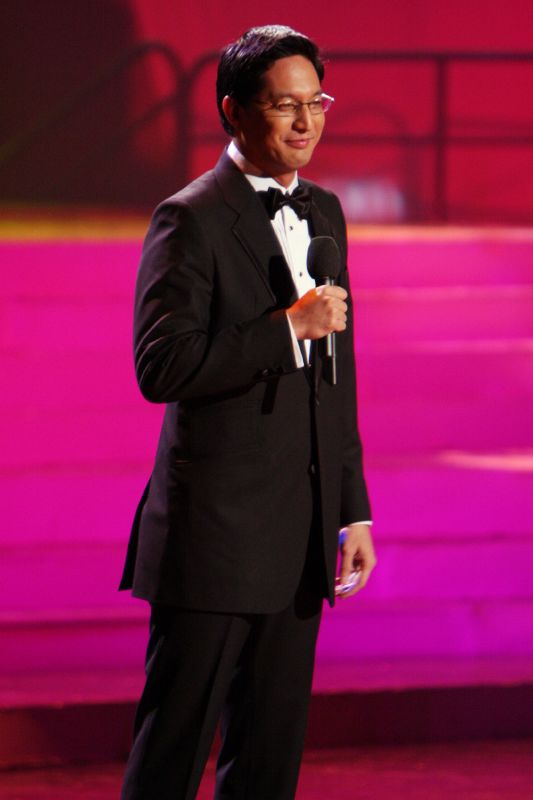
Paolo Bediones

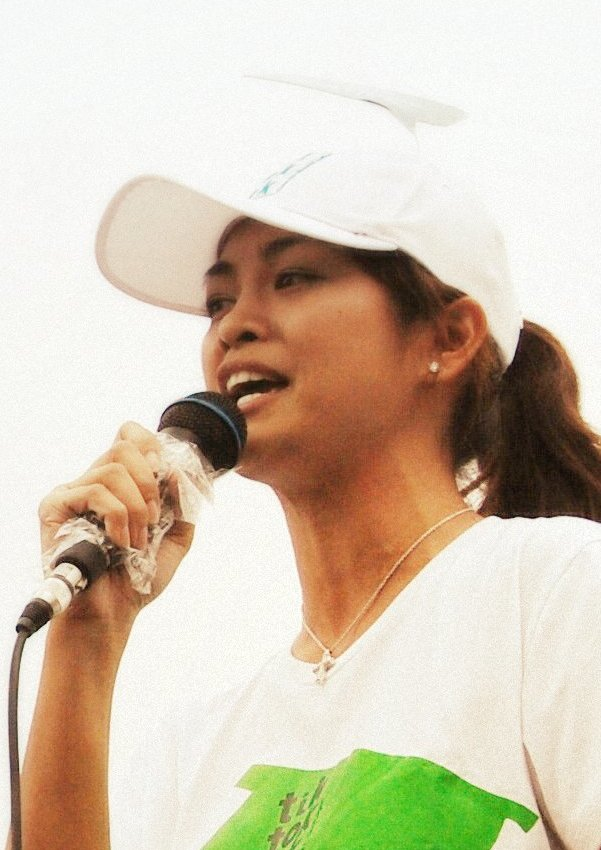
Miriam Quiambao

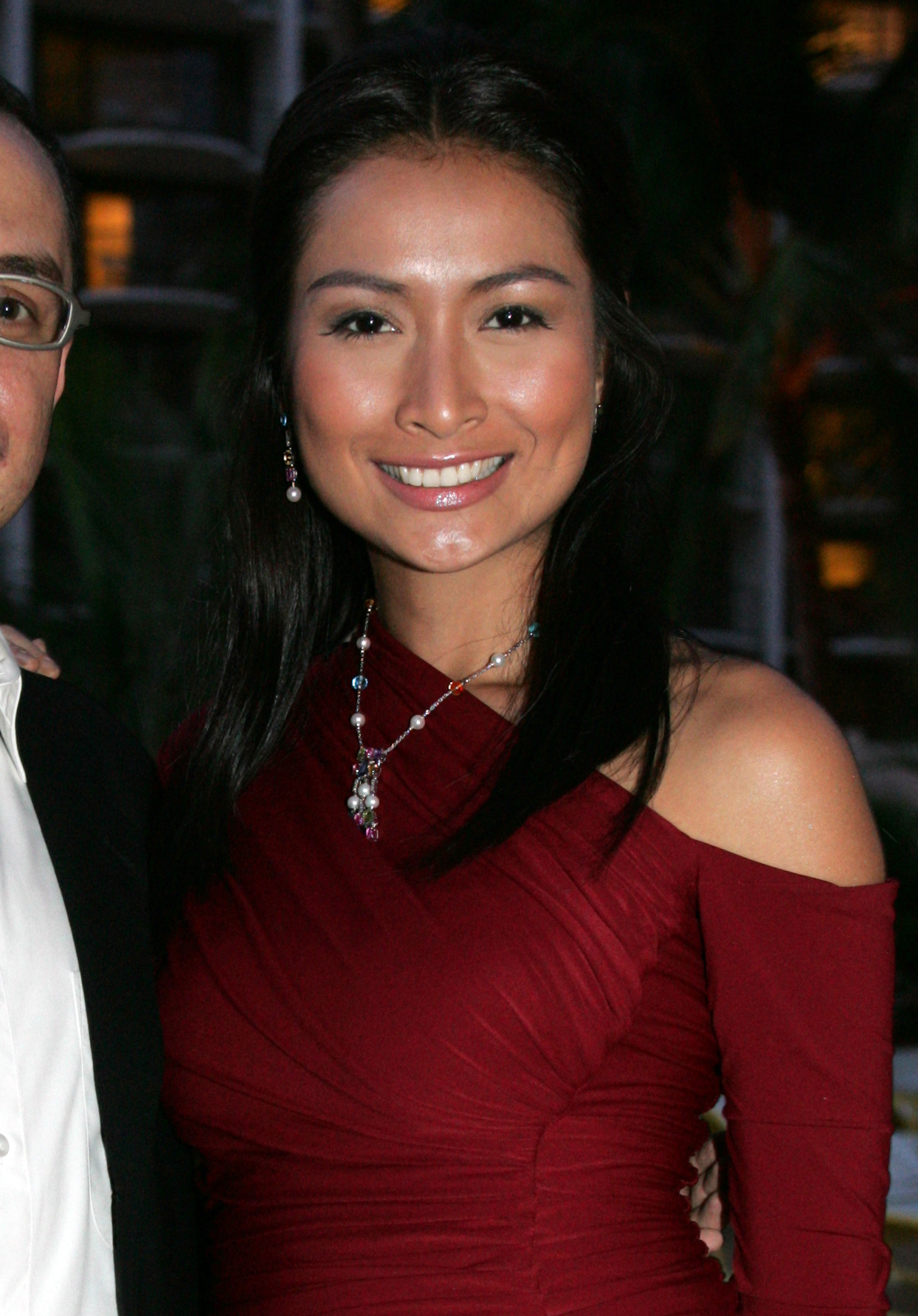
Phoemela Baranda

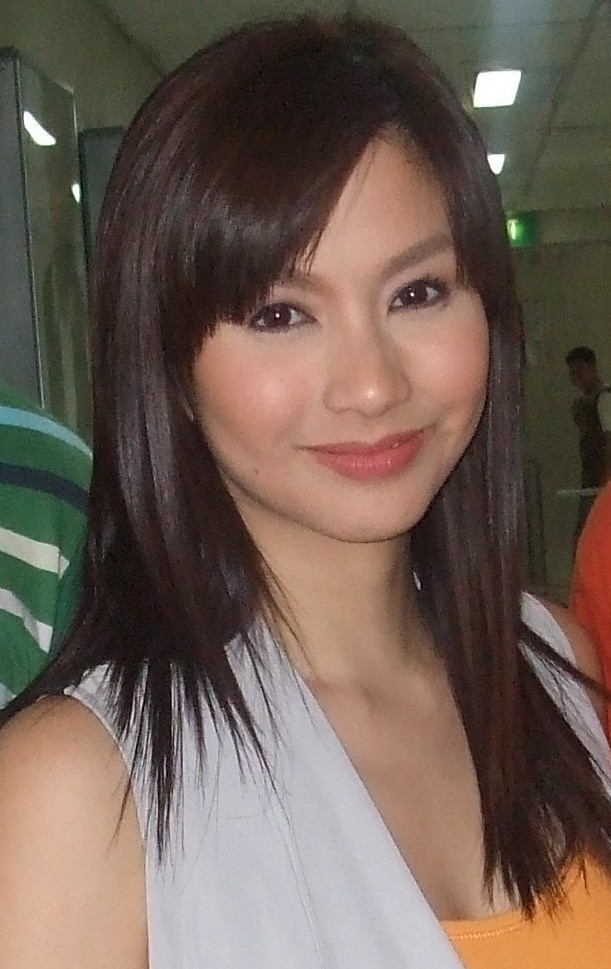
Mariel Rodriguez

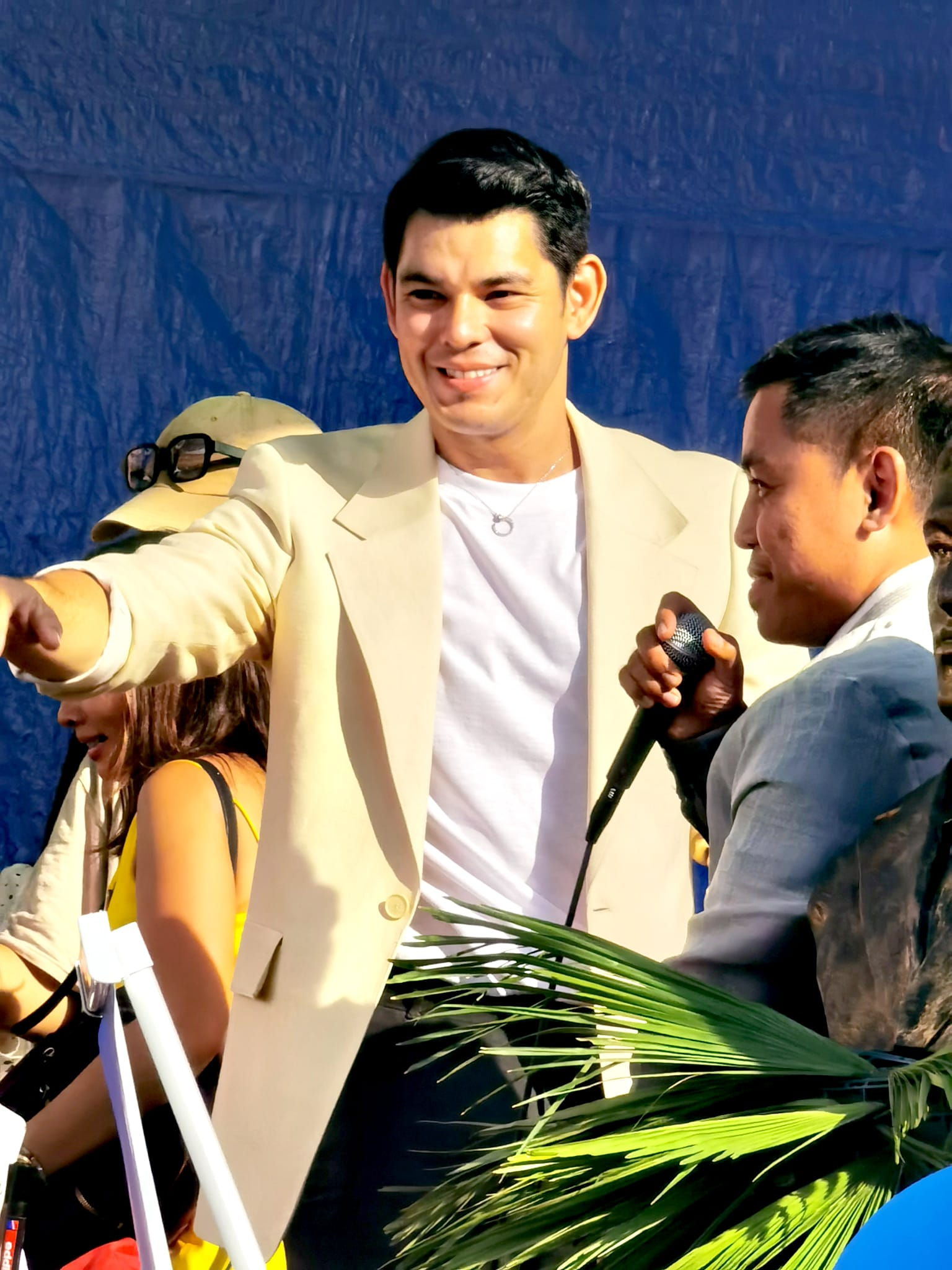
Richard Gutierrez

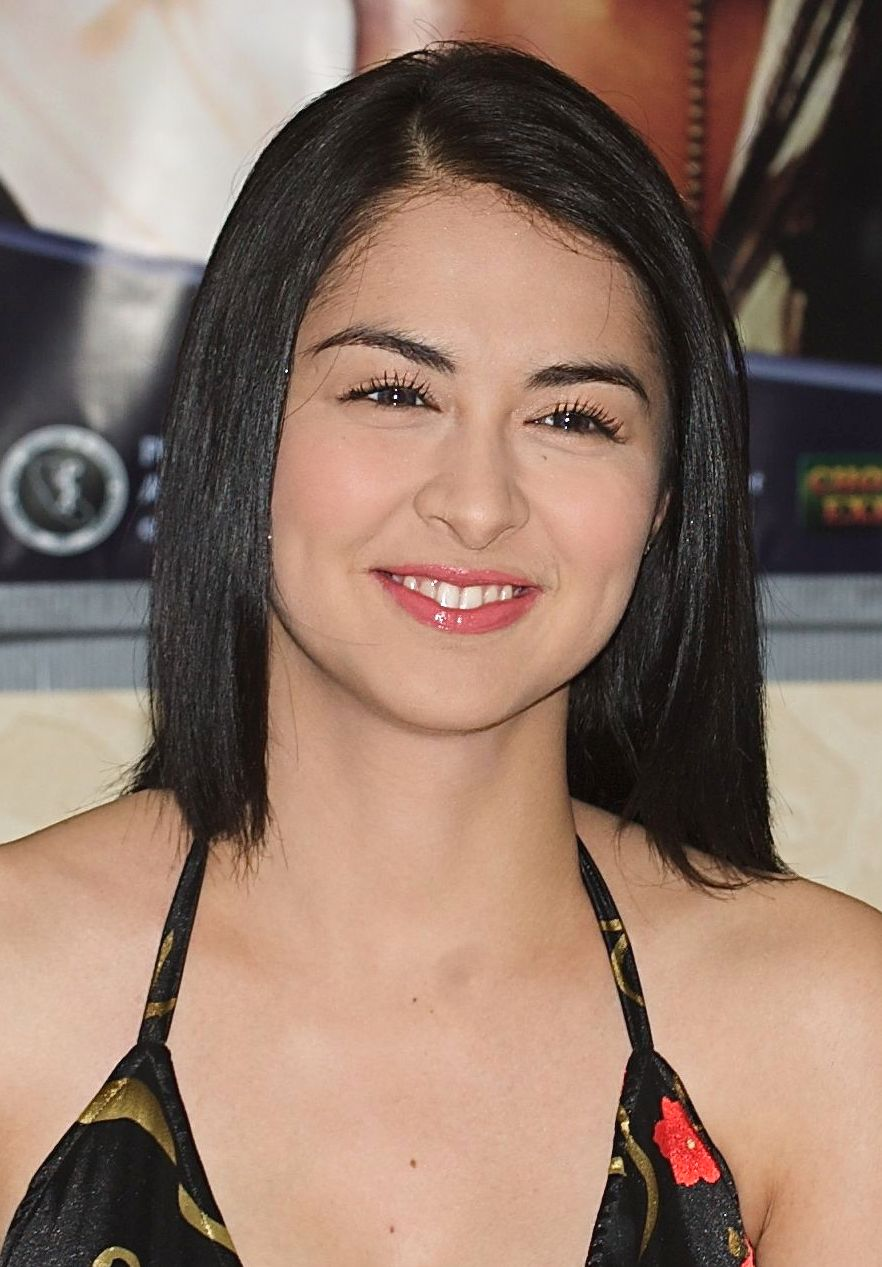
Marian Rivera

- Karen Davila (1999–2000)
- Paolo Bediones (1999–2006)
- Miriam Quiambao (2000–04, 2006)
- Phoemela Baranda (2004)
- Ethel Booba (2004–06)
- Mariel Rodriguez (2004)
- Richard Gutierrez (2012–13)
- Marian Rivera (2012–13)
- Boobay (2012–13)

== Ratings ==
According to AGB Nielsen Philippines' Mega Manila household television ratings, the season premiere of Extra Challenge Extreme on October 27, 2012, earned a 24.6% rating.

== Accolades ==
Accolades received by Extra Challenge
Year	Award	Category	Recipient	Result	Ref.
2005	Golden Screen TV Awards	Outstanding Reality/Competition Program	Extra Challenge: Astig	Nominated	
2006	20th PMPC Star Awards for Television	Best Reality Competition Program	Extra Challenge	Won	
2006	20th PMPC Star Awards for Television	Best Reality Competition Program Host	Paolo Bediones Ethel Booba	Won	
2013	27th PMPC Star Awards for Television	Best Reality Competition Program	Extra Challenge	Won	
2013	27th PMPC Star Awards for Television	Best Reality Competition Program Host	Marian Rivera Richard Gutierrez Boobay	Nominated	

== Controversy ==
In 2012, during the filming of the show, actress Karen delos Reyes and comedian host Boobay fought with each other. The fight occurred when Boobay used the wrong surname for Delos Reyes, calling the actress as "Karen Delos Santos", which Delos Reyes didn't accept as a joke.
