= Hashtag Like =

Philippine television reality show

#Like
- Title card
- Genre: Reality show
- Presented by: Tom Rodriguez; Balang
- Country of origin: Philippines
- Original language: Tagalog
- No. of episodes: 24

Production
- Camera setup: Multiple-camera setup
- Running time: 45 minutes
- Production company: GMA Entertainment TV

Original release
- Network: GMA Network
- Release: September 3, 2016 – February 11, 2017

#Like is a Philippine television talent reality show broadcast by GMA Network. Hosted by Tom Rodriguez and Balang, it premiered on September 3, 2016 on the network's Sabado Star Power sa Hapon line up. The show concluded on February 11, 2017, with a total of 24 episodes.

== Ratings ==
According to AGB Nielsen Philippines' Urban Luzon television ratings, the pilot episode of #Like earned a 16.3% rating. The final episode scored an 11.1% rating in Nationwide Urban Television Audience Measurement.

== Accolades ==
Accolades received by #Like
Year	Award	Category	Recipient	Result	Ref.
2017	31st PMPC Star Awards for Television	Best Talent Search Program	#Like	Nominated	
2017	31st PMPC Star Awards for Television	Best Talent Search Program Host	Balang Tom Rodriguez	Nominated	
