= Andres de Saya =

2011 Philippine television sitcom series

- Title card
- Genre: Sitcom
- Based on: Andres de Saya by Carlo J. Caparas
- Written by: Manny Pavia; Ferdie Aguas
- Directed by: Cesar Cosme
- Starring: Cesar Montano; Iza Calzado
- Country of origin: Philippines
- Original language: Tagalog
- No. of episodes: 13

Production
- Executive producer: Wilma Galvante
- Camera setup: Multiple-camera setup
- Running time: 30–45 minutes
- Production company: GMA Entertainment TV

Original release
- Network: GMA Network
- Release: May 28 – August 21, 2011

Andres de Saya is a 2011 Philippine television sitcom series broadcast by GMA Network. The series is a television adaptation of comic novel of Carlo J. Caparas. Directed by Cesar Cosme, it stars Cesar Montano and Iza Calzado. It premiered on May 28, 2011. The series concluded on August 21, 2011, with a total of 13 episodes.

== Cast and characters ==
Cast

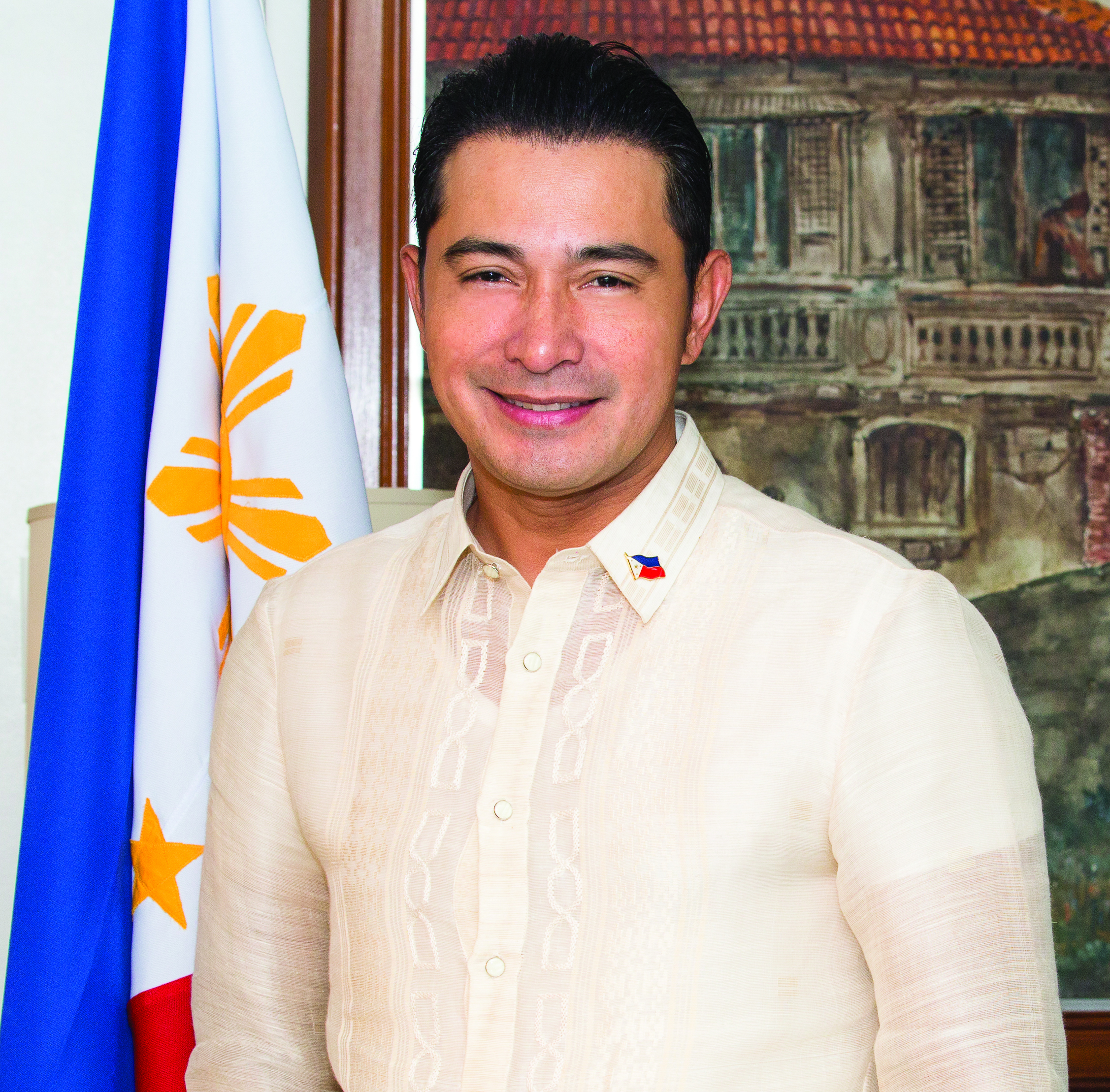
Cesar Montano

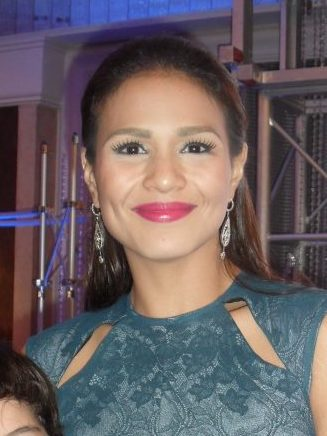
Iza Calzado

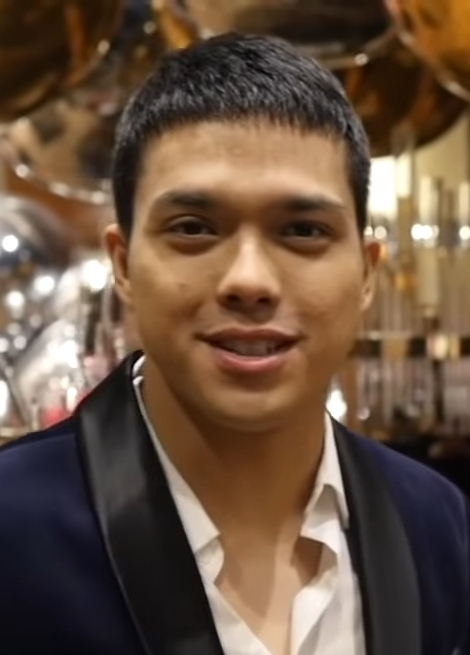
Elmo Magalona

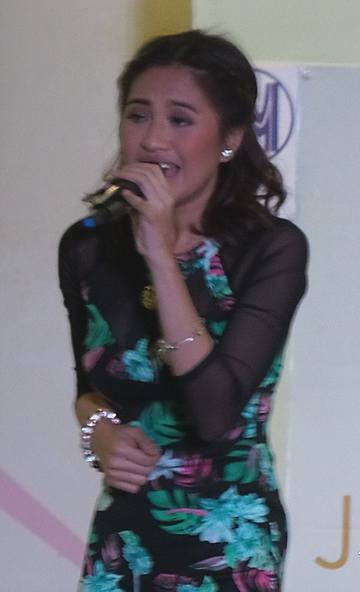
Julie Anne San Jose

Lead cast

- Cesar Montano as Andres "Andy" Taguyod
- Iza Calzado as Matilde "Matt" Golpe De Oro-Taguyod

Supporting cast

- Gloria Romero as Coring
- Caridad Sanchez as Minda
- Fabio Ide as Victor Del Mundo
- Elmo Magalona as Bryan
- Julie Anne San Jose as Lizzy
- Jillian Ward as Jecjec
- Chariz Solomon as Charing
- Pekto as Adonis "Tsong" Penyaratot

Guest cast

- Iwa Moto as Nica Landutay

== Ratings ==
According to AGB Nielsen Philippines' Mega Manila People/Individual television ratings, the pilot episode of Andres de Saya earned a 9.9% rating. The final episode scored an 11.6% rating.

== Accolades ==
Accolades received by Andres de Saya
Year	Award	Category	Recipient	Result	Ref.
2011	8th Golden Screen TV Awards	Outstanding Breakthrough Performance by an Actor	Elmo Magalona	Nominated	
2011	8th Golden Screen TV Awards	Outstanding Breakthrough Performance by an Actress	Julie Anne San Jose	Nominated	
2011	8th Golden Screen TV Awards	Outstanding Comedy Program	Andres de Saya	Nominated	
2011	8th Golden Screen TV Awards	Outstanding Performance by an Actor in a Gag or Comedy Program	Cesar Montano	Nominated	
2011	8th Golden Screen TV Awards	Outstanding Performance by an Actress in a Gag or Comedy Program	Iza Calzado	Nominated	
2011	8th Golden Screen TV Awards	Outstanding Supporting Actor in a Gag or Comedy Program	Pekto	Nominated	
2011	8th Golden Screen TV Awards	Outstanding Supporting Actress in a Gag or Comedy Program	Gloria Romero	Nominated	
