= John Philip Bughaw =

Filipino child dancer and actor

- Born: November 7, 2008 (age 17)
- Other name: Balang
- Occupations: Actor and dancer
- Years active: 2015–2019

John Philip Bughaw, popularly known as Balang (born November 7, 2008), is a Filipino teenaged dancer and actor. Balang started dancing when he was 4 years old and his cover of Justin Bieber's "Sorry" has been viewed more than 8 million times having him recognized by Ellen DeGeneres. He since guested on The Ellen DeGeneres Show several times.

== Filmography ==
Year	Title	Role
2017	Karelasyon	Harry
2017	#Like	as Himself
2016	Conan My Beautician	Connor
2016	Wagas	as Himself
2016	Magkaibang Mundo	Dino
2016	Magpakailanman	as Himself
2015 – 2017	The Ellen DeGeneres Show	Guest
2015	It's Showtime	Himself / MiniMe Contestant
