= Day Off (TV program) =

Philippine television reality show

- Title card
- Genre: Reality television
- Directed by: John Gary Candelaria
- Presented by: Janine Gutierrez; Ken Chan
- Country of origin: Philippines
- Original language: Tagalog
- No. of episodes: 746

Production
- Executive producer: Carlo Balaquiot
- Camera setup: Multiple-camera setup
- Running time: 45 minutes
- Production company: GMA News and Public Affairs

Original release
- Network: QTV/Q (2005–11); GMA News TV (2011–19)
- Release: November 12, 2005 – May 25, 2019

Day Off is a Philippine television reality show broadcast by QTV, Q and GMA News TV. The show awards people with a day off from their job. Originally hosted by Pekto and Carmina Villarroel, it premiered from November 12, 2005. The show concluded on May 25, 2019, with a total of 746 episodes. Janine Gutierrez and Ken Chan served as the final hosts.

== Hosts ==
- Carmina Villarroel
- Pekto
- Isabel Oli
- Bela Padilla
- Julie Anne San Jose
- Janine Gutierrez
- Ken Chan

Co-hosts

- Jason Francisco
- Dasuri Choi
- Boobay
- Maey Bautista

== Accolades ==
Accolades received by Day Off
Year	Award	Category	Recipient	Result	Ref.
2008	Catholic Mass Media Awards	Best Entertainment Program	Day Off	Won	
2009	Anak TV Seal Awards	Most Well-Liked TV Program	Day Off	Included	
2009	23rd PMPC Star Awards for Television	Best Reality Program	Day Off	Nominated	
2010	24th PMPC Star Awards for Television	Best Reality Program	Day Off	Nominated	
2010	24th PMPC Star Awards for Television	Best Reality Program Host	Mike "Pekto" Nacua Carmina Villaroel	Nominated	
2014	28th PMPC Star Awards for Television	Best Reality Program	Day Off	Nominated	
2014	28th PMPC Star Awards for Television	Best Reality Program Host	Maey Bautista Mike "Pekto" Nacua Betong Sumaya	Nominated	
2015	29th PMPC Star Awards for Television	Best Reality Program	Day Off	Nominated	
2015	29th PMPC Star Awards for Television	Best Reality Program Host	Maey Bautista Boobay Dasuri Choi Mike "Pekto" Nacua Julie Anne San Jose	Nominated	
2018	32nd PMPC Star Awards for Television	Best Magazine Show	Day Off	Nominated	
2018	32nd PMPC Star Awards for Television	Best Magazine Show Host	Ken Chan Janine Gutierrez	Nominated	
