= Phoemela Baranda =

Filipino television presenter (born 1980)

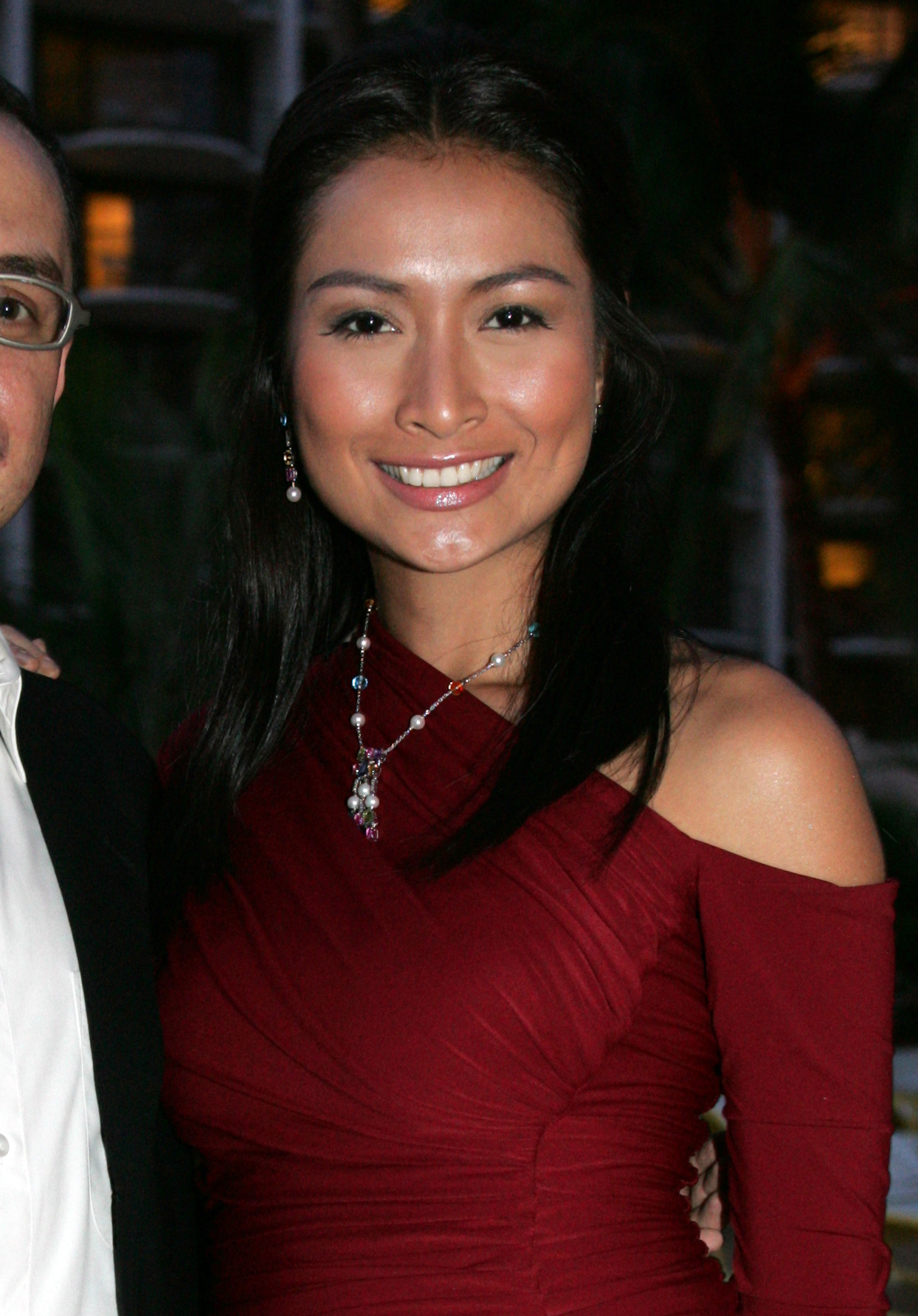
- Born: Phoemela Ramirez Baranda; October 1, 1980 (age 46); Manila, Philippines
- Years active: 1994–present
- Partner: Jason Choachuy
- Children: 2
- Modelling information
- Height: 1.73 m (5 ft 8 in)
- Hair colour: Dark brown
- Eye colour: Dark brown
- Agency: Professional Models Association of the Philippines
- Website: phoemelabaranda.com

Phoemela Ramirez Baranda (Tagalog: [fɛˈmɛla bɐˈɾanda]; born October 1, 1980) is a Filipino model and actress who served as the Star Patrol segment anchor of ABS-CBN's weekday flagship news broadcast TV Patrol from November 22, 2004 to November 5, 2010. She is a former officer and currently a member of Professional Models Association of the Philippines (PMAP) and appears regularly on magazine covers and advertising campaigns. She has appeared in five Tagalog movies, four TV series, and was a host for the Philippine reality show Extra, Extra. In 2008, she was a contestant in the Philippine version of Fear Factor.

== Career ==
Baranda started modelling when she was 13 years old, joining the clothing brand Pink Soda's club search where she was selected. Her first commercial was for Extraderm, a line of facial products. After her runner-up finish at the 1994 Philippine search for the Elite Model Look in 1994, she continued her modeling stints in ramp, mainstream media advertising campaigns and print media, appearing on the covers of the local editions of Uno, Cosmopolitan, Seventeen, T3, Mega Magazine, Preview, Marie Claire and Maxim.

In 2000, she briefly played a minor part in the Philippine television series Pangako sa ’Yo, which she quickly followed up with Cool Dudes. In 2003 she played Esmeralda in the GMA series Narito ang Puso Ko. She got her first hosting stint in Extra Challenge when she did a successful audition when Miriam Quiambao left the reality show in 2003. She has then transferred to ABS-CBN as a segment host for the showbiz gossip show The Buzz, which paved the way for her next project on TV Patrol.

Baranda placed 23rd in the FHM 100 Sexiest Women of the World in 2006; she has also placed 48th in 2003, 29th in 2004, 49th in 2005, and 79th in 2007.

== Personal life ==
Baranda has a bachelor's degree in Interdisciplinary Studies, having graduated from De La Salle-College of Saint Benilde in 2001. She lives an active lifestyle engaging in physical activities such as going to the gym and bikram yoga, she is also active in sports particularly badminton and squash where she has placed in several local open tournaments.

She has one child, Nichole, whom she had at age 19. Nichole gained fame after joining Pinoy Big Brother: All In as a teen housemate.

Baranda has been in a longtime relationship with businessman and professional race car driver Jason Choachuy. In November 2020, she announced that the couple were expecting their first child together, due in March 2021.

== Filmography ==
=== Film ===
Year	Film	Role
2001	Cool Dudes	Chantal
2005	Dubai	Melba
2005	Exodus: Tales from the Enchanted Kingdom	Reyna Alana
2006	Ang Pamana: The Inheritance	Vanessa
2006	Tatlong Baraha	Corazon/Cory
2013	Coming Soon	
2013	Huling Henya	
2020	Hindi Tayo Pwede	Ma'am Louise

=== Television ===
Year	Title	Role
2000	Pangako sa ’Yo	Queenie Bermudez
2001–2002	Eat Bulaga!	Herself / Host
2003	Narito ang Puso Ko	Esmeralda San Victores
2003–2004	Extra, Extra	Herself / Host
2004–2015	The Buzz	Herself / Voice over
2004–2010	TV Patrol World/TV Patrol	Herself / Star Patrol anchor
2005	Mga Anghel na Walang Langit	
2007	Ysabella	Reporter
2008	Pinoy Fear Factor	Herself / Contestant
2010; 2011	Showtime	Herself / Judge
2010	Magkaribal	Reporter
2010–2012	Umagang Kay Ganda	Herself / Host
2011	I Dare You	Herself / Guest host and challenger
2012	Enchanted Garden	
2012–2018	Celebrity Talk	Herself / Host
2012–2014	Cityscape	Herself / Host
2013	Boracay Bodies	
2013	Maria Mercedes	Yvette
2014	Confessions of a Torpe	Christine Zulueta
2014–present	Anong Ganap?	Herself / Host
2022	How to Move On in 30 Days	Clara
2025	Slay: ‘Til Death Do Us Part	Margarita "Marga" Baltazar
