= Pekto =

Filipino actor, comedian and television host (born 1973)

- Born: Mike Nacua; June 14, 1973 (age 53); Cebu, Philippines
- Occupations: Actor; comedian; television host
- Years active: 1998–present
- Agent: Sparkle GMA Artist Center

Mike Nacua (born June 14, 1973), known professionally as Pekto, is a Filipino actor, comedian and television host. He rose to prominence in Nuts Entertainment (2003), as the original host of Day Off (2005), and as Bobong in the sitcom Ismol Family (2014).

== Career ==
In 1998, Pekto entered the entertainment industry as a props man, drawing on his background in Fine Arts. Although he was unable to complete his studies due to financial constraints, he advanced to become an art director. He later shared that production crew members were sometimes asked to appear as extras, leading to his unexpected on-screen roles. Beginning with brief appearances and one-line lines, he eventually became a regular cast member in several shows and was later given his own segment.

That same year, he co-hosted the television comedy show Wow Mali with Joey De Leon. In 2003, he joined the cast of the sketch comedy show Nuts Entertainment, where he played the comedy character Cookie alongside John Feir. In 2005, he hosted the reality show Day Off with Carmina Villaroel. From 2005 to 2006, he appeared in the Encantadia franchise, portraying the character Banak.

In 2006, Pekto returned to host the sketch comedy show Teka Mona! alongside Joey De Leon. In 2011, he played Adonis Penyaratot in the sitcom series Andres de Saya. In 2014, he appeared as Bamborito in the docudrama horror anthology series Elemento episode "Apoy ni Bamborito". That same year, he gained further prominence as Roberto "Bobong" Laqui in the sitcom series Ismol Family. He joined the cast of variety show Sunday Pinasaya in 2016, followed by All-Out Sundays in 2021. He also appeared in several other television programs broadcast by GMA Network.

== Filmography ==
=== Film ===
| Year | Title | Role | Ref. |
|---|---|---|---|
| 2005 | Okey Ka, Pare Ko: Soon to Be a Legend | Clavio | |
| 2005 | Sablay Ka Na, Pasaway Ka Pa | Anton | |
| 2005 | Hari ng Sablay: Isang Tama, Sampung Mali | Bok | |
| 2006 | Till I Met You | Tikyo | |
| 2008 | Shake, Rattle & Roll X | Adonis | |
| 2009 | Ang Panday | | |
| 2009 | Yaya and Angelina: The Spoiled Brat Movie | Bernard | |
| 2016 | Enteng Kabisote 10 and the Abangers | Security guard #2 | |
| 2018 | Jack Em Popoy: The Puliscredibles | PO2 Piolo Pasakal | |
| 2019 | Cara x Jagger | Andrew | |
| 2023 | Kahit Maputi Na ang Buhok Ko | | |
| 2023 | Tricycle Driver, Kasangga Mo | | |
| 2023 | Nagalit ang Patay sa Haba ng Lamay: Da Resbak | | |
| 2025 | Kontrabida | | |

=== Television ===
| Year | Title | Role | Notes | Ref. |
|---|---|---|---|---|
| 1999–2004 | Ispup | Himself / Ispupnik | | |
| 1998–2008 | Wow Mali | Himself (co-host) | | |
| 2003–2008 | Nuts Entertainment | Cookie | | |
| 2004 | Te Amo, Maging Sino Ka Man | Nomi | | |
| 2004–2007 | Bahay Mo Ba 'To? | Jonathan David Benoit | | |
| 2005–2009 | Day Off | Himself (host) | | |
| 2005–2006 | Etheria: Ang Ikalimang Kaharian ng Encantadia | Banak | | |
| 2006 | Encantadia: Pag-ibig Hanggang Wakas | Banak | | |
| 2006–2007 | Teka Mona! | | | |
| 2007–2008 | Carlo J. Caparas' Kamandag | Doro | | |
| 2009 | Darna | Jerry | | |
| 2011 | Spooky Nights | Mad-ako | Episode: "The Ringtone" | |
| 2011 | Andres de Saya | Adonis "Tsong" Penyaratot | | |
| 2011 | Spooky Nights | Alma | Episode: "Short Time of My Life" | |
| 2011–2012 | Daldalita | Kirat the Mouse | | |
| 2012 | My Daddy Dearest | Marco | | |
| 2013 | Indio | Pedro | | |
| 2013 | Dormitoryo | Ador Silva | | |
| 2014 | Adarna | Hugho | | |
| 2014 | My BFF | Old man | | |
| 2014 | Elemento: Apoy ni Bambolito | Bambolito | | |
| 2014–2016 | Ismol Family | Roberto "Bobong" Laqui | | |
| 2015–2016 | MariMar | Eliong | | |
| 2015 | Once Upon a Kiss | Badong | | |
| 2015 | Alamat | Kuneho / Diego (voice) | Episode: "Mariang Sinukuan" | |
| 2016 | KalyeSerye | Cookie | | |
| 2016 | Magkaibang Mundo | Bombi | | |
| 2016 | Naku, Boss Ko! | Mr. C | | |
| 2016–2019 | Sunday PinaSaya | Himself (co-host) | | |
| 2016 | Superstar Duets | Himself (contestant) | | |
| 2016–2017 | Hahamakin ang Lahat | Johnny | | |
| 2017 | Meant to Be | Topeks | | |
| 2017 | Mulawin vs. Ravena | Simeon | | |
| 2018 | Hindi Ko Kayang Iwan Ka | Tantoy Cruz | | |
| 2018 | Kambal, Karibal | Olsec (Maricar's Driver) | | |
| 2018 | Victor Magtanggol | Ringgo | | |
| 2018 | Daig Kayo ng Lola Ko | Minggoy | Episode: "Dobol, Tripol" | |
| 2018 | Onanay | Hector | | |
| 2018 | Sarap, 'Di Ba? | Himself (guest) | | |
| 2020 | Anak ni Waray vs. Anak ni Biday | Randy | | |
| 2020 | Descendants of the Sun | Peryante | | |
| 2021 | Owe My Love | Oryo Guipit | | |
| 2021–2023 | All-Out Sundays | Himself (co-host) | | |
| 2021–2022 | Pepito Manaloto: Ang Unang Kuwento | Senyong | | |
| 2022 | Panalo o Talo It's You | Victor Pinagpala | | |
| 2022 | Running Man Philippines | Himself (guest) | | |
| 2022–2024 | Jose & Maria's Bonggang Villa | Solomon "Sol" Banayad | | |
| 2023 | Abot-Kamay na Pangarap | Elmer | | |
| 2023 | Royal Blood | Magician | | |
| 2023 | Open 24/7 | Pablo | | |
| 2024 | Makiling | Estong | | |
| 2025 | Cruz vs Cruz | Abel | | |
| 2026 | Miss Behave | Ernesto Baldemor | | |
| 2026 | Barangay Love Stories | Dylan and Nicko's father | Episode: "'Di Ko Maiwasan" | |
