= Thea Astley (singer) =

Filipino singer, theater actress and host (born 2000)

- Born: Thea Gosilatar Astley; March 8, 2000 (age 26); Quezon City, Philippines
- Education: University of London
- Occupations: Singer; songwriter; actress; host
- Years active: 2019–present
- Agent: Sparkle (2020–present)
- Known for: The Clash; All-Out Sundays
- Musical career
- Genres: Soul; R&B; Pop
- Label: Universal Records (2023–present)
- Member of: Divas of the Queendom

Thea Gosilatar Astley (born March 8, 2000) professionally known as Thea Astley, is a Filipino singer, songwriter, theater actress and host. She is the first runner-up in the second season of singing competition The Clash.

Astley is currently serving as one of the co-hosts and voice over artist of variety show All-Out Sundays. In 2025, She won Veiled Musician 2025 alongside fellow Season 1 Clash Member, Garrett Bolden, and Season 5 and 7 runner-up Arabelle Dela Cruz.

== Life and career ==
Thea Astley was born in Quezon City, Philippines. She was raised in Doha, Qatar, where she also resided with her family. In 2018, Astley returned to the Philippines, and was supposed to continue studying at the Ateneo de Manila University.

However in 2019, she advanced to the Top 64 of The Clash season 2, after participating in variety show Studio 7's competition segment Duet with Me. Astley ended up being the first runner-up to grand winner Jeremiah Tiangco.

After the competition, Astley became part of the musical-comedy variety show All-Out Sundays as a mainstay since 2020. She signed a contract with GMA Artist Center (now Sparkle) on March 10, 2020. Astley performed several theme songs and soundtracks for GMA Network dramas such as the anthology Magpakailanman, series First Yaya (and its continuation First Lady), The World Between Us, Nakarehas na Puso, and Start-Up PH.

Dubbed as the "Kapuso Soul Princess", Astley became notable as she joined the All-Out Sundays' female group segment Divas of the Queendom, showcasing her vocal talents along with Julie Anne San Jose, Lani Misalucha, Aicelle Santos, Rita Daniela, Hannah Precillas, Golden Cañedo, Zephanie, Jessica Villarubin, Jennie Gabriel, and Mariane Osabel. A concert titled Queendom: Live was held on December 2, 2023 at the Newport Performing Arts Theater.

In 2021, she hosted a music podcast Behind The Song, where she interviewed her fellow musicians.

On March 21, 2023, Astley signed a recording contract with Universal Records. Under the label, she released her self-penned single "Never" on January 26, 2024. the music video is released on February 2.

Astley has been portraying roles in Broadway musicals, such as Rent and Once on This Island, which are respectively staged by 9Works Theatrical at the RCBC Theater Plaza

She became one of the hosts of ATM (Adventure. Taste. Moments)' video podcast TRGGRD!, along with fellow Sparkle artists Cheska Fausto, Vince Maristela, Sean Lucas, and Jeff Moses.

In 2025, Astley also competed as one of the celebrities in the dance-reality show Stars on the Floor.

== Performances ==
The Clash season 2 performances
Episode	Date	Song	Links
1	September 21, 2019	Ain't No Sunshine	
11	October 26, 2019	Upuan	"The Clash 2019: Thea Astley mixes rap and high notes with her version of “Upuan” Top 32"
14	November 3, 2019	All I Ask of You	
18	November 17, 2019	Malaya	"The Clash 2019: Thea Astley releases her emotions by singing "Malaya" Top 12"
20	November 24, 2019	Bakit	"The Clash 2019: Thea Astley dedicates "Bakit" for her first love Top 10"
22	December 1, 2019	Joy to the World	
23	December 7, 2019	Bring Me to Life	
25	December 14, 2019	Bad Romance, Poker Face, Born This Way	"The Clash: Thea Astley channels her inner Lady Gaga"
26 (Grand Finals)	December 15, 2019	The Greatest Performance and River Deep – Mountain High	"The Clash: Thea Astley's Top 5 Performance (The Greatest Performance & River Deep Mountain High)"
26 (Grand Finals)	December 15, 2019	(You Make Me Feel Like) A Natural Woman	

== Discography ==
Singles
Year	Title	Featured artist(s)	Composer(s)	Label	Notes	Ref.
2025	Gitna ng Lahat	N/A	Rina May L. Mercado	GMA Playlist	My Father's Wife theme song	
2024	Never	N/A	Herself	Universal Records		
2022	Muling Tanggapin	N/A	Roxy Fabian	GMA Playlist	Nakarehas na Puso theme song	
2022	Love Together This Summer	Anthony Rosaldo	Jann Fayel Lopez	GMA Music	GMA Network's Summer 2022 jingle	
2022	Love and Hope Together	Jeremiah Tiangco	Emman Rivera	GMA Music	GMA Network's Kapuso Month/Valentines 2022 jingle	
2022	Let It Spark	Psalms David and XOXO	Alex L. Almario	GMA Music / GMA Playlist	Sparkle GMA Artist Center theme song	
2021	Pusong Pinoy, Magpakailanman	Jeremiah Tiangco	Senedy Que and Simon Tan	GMA Playlist	Magpakailanman theme song	

Album
Year	Title	Tracks	Label	Notes	Ref.
2021	First Yaya (Original Soundtrack)	Ang Puso Kong Ito'y Sa'Yo	GMA Playlist	Also the theme song of the series' continuation First Lady	
2021	First Yaya (Original Soundtrack)	Isang Tulad Mo	GMA Playlist		

Unreleased
Year	Title	Featured artist	Composer	Notes	Ref.
2022	Hanggang Sa Makaidlip	N/A	Natasha L. Correos	Start-Up PH soundtrack	
2022	Magtiwala Ka Lang	Jeremiah Tiangco	Natasha L. Correos	Start-Up PH soundtrack	
2021	Ang Aking Awitin	Garrett Bolden	Edwin G. Guerrero	The World Between Us theme song	

== Filmography ==
Television
Year	Title	Role	Notes	Ref.
2025	Beyond 75: The GMA 75th Anniversary Special	Herself	Performer	
2025	Stars on the Floor	Herself	Contestant	
2023–24	Kapuso Countdown to 2024: The GMA New Year Special	Herself	Performer	
2023	Fast Talk with Boy Abunda	Herself	Guest	
2023	Family Feud Philippines	Herself	Contestant (Team Queendom)	
2023	NCAA Season 99: Opening Ceremony	Herself	Performer	
2023	The Clash season 5	Herself	Guest / Non-competition performer	
2022–23	Kapuso Countdown to 2023: Gayo Daejeon	Herself	Performer	
2022; 2023; 2024	TiktoClock	Herself	Guest Performer / Player / Tanghalan ng Kampeon judge	
2022	NCAA Season 98: Opening Ceremony	Herself	Performer	
2022	NCAA Season 97: Women's Volleyball	Herself	Guest / Performer	
2022	Game On! NCAA Season 97	Herself	Guest	
2022	Lazada Super Party: Epic 10th Birthday	Herself	Performer	
2022	NCAA Season 97: Opening Ceremony	Herself	Performer	
2022; 2023	The Boobay and Tekla Show	Herself	Guest / Performer	
2021	Paskong Pangarap: The 2021 GMA Christmas Special	Herself	Performer	
2021	Lazada 11:11 Super Show	Herself	Performer / Co-host	
2021	The Clash season 4	Herself	Guest / Non-competition performer	
2021	NCAA Season 96: Opening Ceremony	Herself	Performer	
2021	Rise Up Stronger: The Road to NCAA Season 96	Herself	Guest / Performer	
2021	The Clash Flashback Specials	Herself		
2021	Catch Me Out Philippines	Herself	Celebrity Catcher	
2020	Centerstage	Herself	Guest	
2020	Idol sa Kusina	Herself	Guest	
2020–present	All-Out Sundays	Herself	Performer / Co-host / Voice-over	
2019–20	Kapuso Countdown To 2020: The GMA New Year Special	Herself	Performer	
2019	Sunday PinaSaya	Herself	Guest / Performer	
2019; 2020; 2021	MARS Pa More	Herself	Guest / Performer	
2019	Unang Hirit	Herself	Guest / Performer	
2019; 2022; 2023	Sarap, 'Di Ba?	Herself	Guest / Performer	
2019	The Clash season 2	Herself	Contestant / First runner-up	
2019	Studio 7	Herself	Duet with Me Contestant	

Podcast
Year	Title	Role	Note	Ref.
2024	TRGGRD!	Herself	Host	
2021	Behind The Song Podcast	Herself	Host	

Musical play
Year	Title	Role	Ref.
2024	Once on This Island	Ti Moune	
2024	Rent	Mimi Marquez	

== Concert ==
Date	Title	Co-headliners	Venue	Ref.
December 2, 2023	Queendom: Live	Julie Anne San Jose, Rita Daniela, Hannah Precillas, Jessica Villarubin, Mariane Osabel	Newport Performing Arts Theater	
October 10, 2025	Versus	Jessica Villarubin, Chloe Redondo, Mariane Osabel, Hannah Precillas	Music Museum	
