= Anthony Rosaldo =

Filipino singer and actor (born 1994)

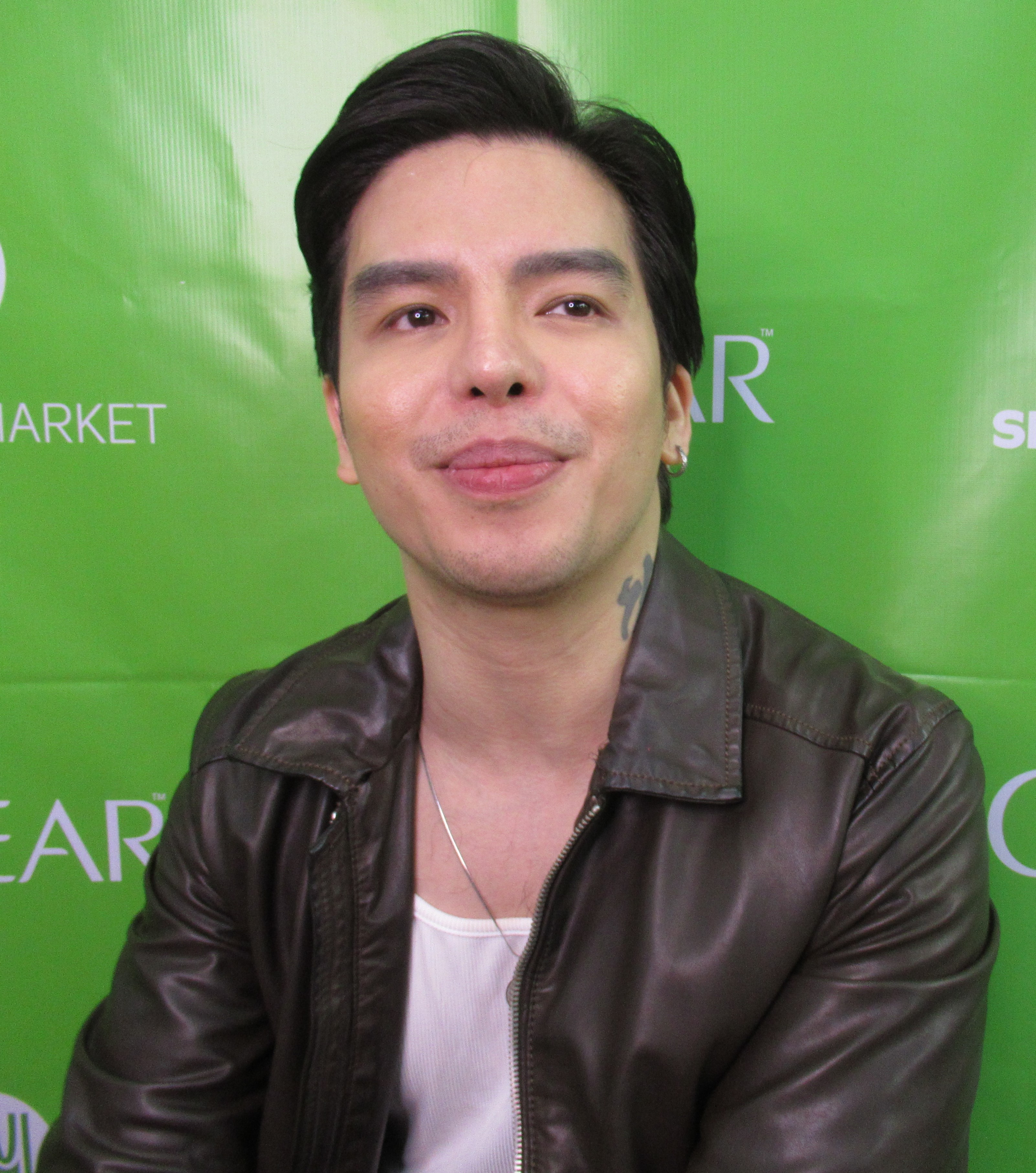
- Rosaldo in 2022
- Born: Anthony John Paul Duclayan Rosaldo; February 1, 1994 (age 32)
- Occupations: Singer; recording artist; actor; host; model
- Years active: 1998; 2016–present
- Agent: Sparkle GMA Artist Center (2018–present)
- Title: Kapuso Pop Rocker
- Musical career
- Genres: Pop
- Label: GMA Music (2018–present)

Anthony John Paul Duclayan Rosaldo (born February 1, 1994), is a Filipino singer, actor, host and model. He was the season 1 finalist of the singing competition The Clash, winning 6th place. He is currently an artist under GMA Network, dubbed as the “Kapuso Pop Rocker”.

== Career ==
=== Early career ===
Rosaldo started out as a child actor. He first appeared on a 1998 Christmas movie Puso ng Pasko, where he played young Dondi.

His television debut was in 2016, when he joined the Eat Bulaga! segment Spogify Feat. Singing Baes, a search for singing heartthrobs. After months of competing, he was selected as one of the 5 grand finalists who eventually became the show's newest boy group. In the same year, Rosaldo released his first single “I Would Give It All” under Ivory Music.

In 2017, Rosaldo represented the Philippines in the world stage. He joined the 21st World Championships of Performing Arts 2017 in Hollywood, California. He brought home 1 gold and 1 bronze medal for singing and 2 gold and 2 silver medals for modeling. Because of the recognition and TV exposures, Anthony booked several local and international shows and concerts including one in Alberta, Canada and one in Beirut, Lebanon.

=== Later career ===
He joined the first season of the very successful all-original reality singing competition The Clash, where he was one of the grand finalists. He later signed an exclusive management contract with GMA Artist Center (now Sparkle) and was given a recording contract under GMA Music. His debut single “Larawan Mo” was released on February 6, 2019. It was well received by audiences. The single has made it to Twitter-trending topics and also topped iTunes PH's charts for a week. The single's music video was released starring several celebrities including GMA's leading lady Kris Bernal. It became the local theme song for Emperor; Ruler of The Mask. it has over half a million streams on Spotify.

Continuously working hard on his craft, Rosaldo won Best New Male Singing Performer for the National Customers' Choice Awards 2019 in February 2019.

His first major concert top billed with Mikee Quintos “Revelation” was held on June 28, 2019, at The Music Museum.

Following the success of the sold-out concert, he was awarded Best Male Concert Performer at the Best Choice Awards 2019.

On October 8, 2019, he released his 2nd single, “Maghintay Ka Lamang”, a revival which was originally sung by Ted Ito. The single climbed up the iTunes charts and placed 3rd for 2 consecutive days. It was used as the local theme song for “Sky Castle” aired in November 2019.

Rosaldo renewed his contract with Sparkle in November 2019.

Despite the struggles with the on-going pandemic, Rosaldo was able to release his 3rd single under GMA Music, “Pwedeng Tayo” penned by Davey Langit, Edwin Marollano, Jonathan Manalo and Vehnee Saturno on July 9, 2020. On its release, “Pwedeng Tayo” made it to iTunes PH Top 10 charts. he teamed up with Starstruck season 7 alumna Athena Madrid for the music video, which was released on November 11, 2020.

Rosaldo was then hailed Most Promising Male Recording Artist at the Guillermo Mendoza Memorial Foundation's 51st Box Office Entertainment Awards.

He is currently a mainstay of variety show All-Out Sundays since 2021, wherein he is a part of the "Men of Kingdom", along with his fellow The Clash finalist Garrett Bolden and its season 2 champion Jeremiah Tiangco, which he named both of his closest friends.

== Filmography ==
=== Television ===
Year	Title	Role	Notes
2016; 2019	Eat Bulaga!	Himself	Spogify feat. Singing Baes runner up (2016); Guest (2019)
2016	Tawag ng Tanghalan	Himself	Year 1 Daily Winner
2017; 2018; 2019; 2020	Unang Hirit	Himself	Guest
2017	Kapuso Mo, Jessica Soho	Himself	Guest
2017; 2019	MyxClusive	Himself	Guest
2018	The Clash	Himself	Season 1 finalist
2018–2019	Studio 7	Himself	Guest Performer
2018–2019	iBilib	Himself	Guest
2018–2019	MARS	Himself	Guest
2018	Puso ng Pasko: The GMA Christmas Special	Himself	Performer
2018–2019	Countdown to 2019: The GMA New Year Special	Himself	Performer
2019	Magpakailanman: Beki Basketball Beauties	Jade	With Martin Escudero
2019	Sunday PinaSaya	Himself	Guest
2019	Taste Buddies	Himself	Guest
2019	Tonight With Arnold Clavio	Himself	Guest
2020	Pepito Manaloto	Douglas	Guest character
2020	Magpakailanman: A Scandalous Crime	Earl	
2020	Magpakailanman: Viral Frontliner	James	
2020; 2021–present	All-Out Sundays	Himself	Guest Performer (2020); Performer / Co-host (since 2021)
2020	The Clash Christmas Special: Pasko Para Sa Lahat	Himself	Performer
2021	Ang Dalawang Ikaw	Atty. Chris	Guest cast (uncredited)
2021	NCAA Season 96	Himself	Guest Performer
2021	NCAA Season 96: Opening Ceremony	Himself	Performer
2021	Imbestigador		
2021	Paskong Pangarap: The GMA Christmas Special	Himself	Performer
2022	Regal Studio Presents: Monaylisa and Me	Ricky	
2022	Sarap, 'Di Ba?	Himself	Guest with Jennie Gabriel
2022	The Boobay and Tekla Show	Himself	Guest with Mariane Osabel
2022	NCAA Season 97: Opening Ceremony	Himself	Performer
2022	NCAA Season 97: Battle of Intramuros	Himself	Half-time performer with Julie Anne San Jose, Psalms David, and Jeremiah Tiangco
2022	Wish Ko Lang!: Battered Wife	Jopet	
2022	Family Feud	Himself	Contestant / Team The Clash Boys with Jeremiah Tiangco, Nef Medina, and Vilmark Viray
2022	NCAA Season 98: Opening Ceremony	Himself	Performer
2022	NCAA Season 98: Perpetual VS Arellano	Himself	Half-time performer
2022	Wish Ko Lang!: Killer Menudo		
2022	Regal Studio Presents: Win a Date	Mikko	
2024	It's Showtime	Himself	Guest Performer (EXpecially For You segment)

=== Film ===
- Puso ng Pasko (1998) - young Dondi

== Discography ==
=== Singles ===
Year	Title	Featured artist	Composer(s)	Label	Notes
2016	I Would Give It All	N/A	Richard Mauricio	Enterphil Entertainment Corporation	
2018	Langit	Yesh Anne Burce	Jourieli Tesorio	Insight 360 Consultancy Services, Inc.	CoughPalaran soundtrack
2019	Larawan Mo	N/A	Racquel Gutierrez	GMA Music	Emperor: Ruler of The Mask local soundtrack
2019	Maghintay Ka Lamang	N/A	Ted Ito	GMA Music	Sky Castle local soundtrack
2020	Pwedeng Tayo	N/A	Davey Langit, Edwin Marollano, Jonathan Manalo, Vehnee Saturno	GMA Music	
2021	Nandiyan Ka Na	N/A	Rina Mercado, Natasha L. Correos	GMA Playlist	The Gift soundtrack
2021	Heart of Summer	Hannah Precillas		GMA Playlist	Heart of Asia's 2021 Summer Station ID jingle
2022	Love Wins Ngayong Pasko	Hannah Precillas		GMA Music	Heart of Asia's 2021 Christmas Station ID jingle (release was delayed to 2022)
2022	Love Together This Summer	Thea Astley	Jann Fayel Lopez	GMA Music	GMA Network's 2022 summer jingle
2022	Tama Na	N/A	Himself	GMA Playlist	My Husband in Law local soundtrack

=== Albums ===
Year	Tracks	Tracks	Featured artist	Composer	Label
2019	The Clash Goes Acoustic	Di Na Muli	N/A	Jazz Nicolas	GMA Music
2019	The Clash Goes Acoustic	Sana	N/A	Moses Samuel	GMA Music
2022	The Fake Life Original Soundtrack	Hahayaang Maglaho	N/A	Ann R. Figueroa	GMA Playlist
2022	Wish Ko Lang! 20 Years: Original Soundtrack	Hiling	N/A	Natasha L. Correos	GMA Playlist
2022	Lolong Original Soundtrack	Pampam (Marco Jingle)	N/A	Rina L. Mercado	GMA Playlist
2022	Lolong Original Soundtrack	Ugnayan (Environment Theme)	Mariane Osabel	Rina L. Mercado	GMA Playlist

=== Music videos ===
Year	Song title	Cast featured	Director	Label	Ref
2019	Larawan Mo	Kris Bernal, Kristof Garcia Story 1: Bradley Holmes, Mia Pangyarihan, Xenia Barrameda, Jelly Revilla Story 2: Racquel Gutierrez, Renz Lagria, Lai Austria Story 3: Michelle Dy, BA De Guzman, Mark Kevin Garcia	Miggy Tanchanco	GMA Music	
2019	Maghintay Ka Lamang	N/A	Earl John Ramos	GMA Music	
2020	Pwedeng Tayo	Athena Madrid	Juan Paulo Infante	GMA Music	
2022	Tama Na	N/A	Vince C. Gealogo	GMA Playlist	

== Awards and nominations ==
YEAR	AWARD GIVING BODY	CATEGORY	NOMINATED WORK	RESULT
2017	World Championships of Performing Arts (WCOPA)	Senior Vocals: Contemporary Group Production Number Senior Modelling: Formal Wear Senior Modelling: Swim Wear Senior Modelling: Casual Senior Modelling: Photo	N/A N/A N/A N/A N/A N/A	Bronze medal Gold Medal Gold Medal Gold Medal Silver Medal Silver Medal
2019	National Customer Choice Achievement Awards Best Choice Awards Aliw Awards 11th Star Awards For Music	Best New Male Singing Performer Best Male Concert Performer Best Performance in a Concert (Male) New Male Recording Artist	N/A Revelation Concert Revelation Concert Larawan Mo	Won Won Nominated Nominated
2020	National Customer Choice Achievement Awards Guillermo Mendoza Memorial Foundation's 51st Box Office Entertainment Awards 33rd Awit Awards	Best Male Singing Performer Most Promising Male Recording Artist Favorite Breakthrough Artist	N/A Larawan Mo N/A	Won Won Nominated

== Advertisements ==
Year	Title	Brand
2018	CoughPalaran	Ascof Lagundi
2019	Tuloy	Life Underwriters Association of the Philippines
2020	Gets Ang Lasang Hanap Mo	Alfonso Light Brandy
