= Jessica Villarubin =

Filipino singer (born 1996)

- Born: May 14, 1996 (age 30); San Fernando, Cebu, Philippines
- Occupation: Singer
- Years active: 2020–present
- Agent: Sparkle GMA Artist Center (2020–present)
- Known for: The Clash; All-Out Sundays
- Height: 1.55 m (5 ft 1 in)
- Musical career
- Genres: Pop
- Label: GMA Music (2021–present)
- Member of: Divas of the Queendom
- Website: amap.to/jessicavillarubin/

Jessica Villarubin (Tagalog: [ˌdʒɛːsiˈka bɪljaruˈbin]; born May 14, 1996) is a Filipino singer. She emerged victorious as the third grand champion of GMA's singing competition, The Clash. As an artist under GMA Network, Villarubin is currently seen in variety show All-Out Sundays, as one of the "Divas of the Queendom".

== Personal life and career ==
=== Early beginnings; The Clash journey ===
Hailing from Cebu, Villarubin's beginnings as the breadwinner of her family only fueled her determination to chase her dreams. Despite the challenges of the pandemic, she ventured to Manila with the hope of securing a better future for her family through her passion for singing.

She emerged as the Grand Champion of the Philippine reality singing competition The Clash with praise for her performances and perseverance.

In the grand finals of the competition, Villarubin faced off against fellow competitor, Jennie Gabriel, in a one-on-one showdown. With her personal rendition of Wency Cornejo's "Habang May Buhay" and Jennie's emotive performance of Celine Dion's "All by Myself", the two singers contested for the crown. In the end, Villarubin won and in her historic victory, Villarubin not only secured the title of Grand Champion of The Clash, but also walked away with an impressive array of prizes, including an exclusive management contract from GMA Network, a brand new car, one million cash, and a house and lot. As the ultimate celebration of her triumph, she performed her winning song "Ako Naman" which was composed by one of the judges of the show, Christian Bautista, as her debut single. It was a momentous occasion for Villarubin, as it marked her first-ever performance on national television.

=== Breakthrough ===
Villarubin is now regularly showcasing her vocal abilities as a mainstay of the popular variety show, All-Out Sundays. She shares the stage with a mix of both established and emerging artists. A standout segment in All-Out Sundays is "Divas of the Queendom", where Villarubin takes the stage alongside renowned artists in the Philippine music industry, including Julie Anne San Jose, Aicelle Santos, Rita Daniela and the likes of Hannah Precillas, Thea Astley, and Mariane Osabel. A concert titled Queendom: Live was held on December 2, 2023 at the Newport Performing Arts Theater.

Villarubin is casually guesting on various GMA shows such as Sarap, 'Di Ba?, The Boobay and Tekla Show, and TiktoClock. She also participated in comedy skits and singing popular songs while taking on new challenges.

In 2022, Villarubin made a collaboration with Katrina Velarde, as they covered Celine Dion's "I Surrender", which she also performed in the finals of The Clash. Their cover went viral online.

In February 2024, she became a judge in TiktoClock's revival of 1988 amateur singing competition Tanghalan ng Kampeon, along with OPM hitmaker Renz Verano, The Juans vocalist Carl Guevarra, Daryl Ong, Bugoy Drilon, Mark Bautista, Hannah Precillas and Mariane Osabel.

== Discography ==
Singles
Year	Title	Featured artist	Composer(s)	Label	Notes	Ref.
2022	Hiling	N/A	Rina L. Mercado and Simon L. Tan	GMA Playlist	Theme song of Start-Up PH	
2022	Ikaw Lang Ang Iibigin	N/A	Vehnee Saturno	GMA Music	Local theme song of Put Your Head on My Shoulder	
2021	Agimat ng Agila	Garrett Bolden	Natasha L. Correos John Roque and Jojo Tawasil Nones (additional lyrics)	GMA Playlist	Theme song of the series with the same title	
2021	Walang Hanggan	N/A	Natasha L. Correos	GMA Playlist	Theme song of Nagbabagang Luha	
2021	Beautiful	N/A	Marie Elisha Rodriguez	GMA Music		
2021	Ako Naman	N/A	Christian Bautista	GMA Music	The Clash season 3 victory song	

Albums
Year	Title	Track	Label	Notes	Ref.
2022	Wish Ko Lang! 20 Years: Original Soundtrack	Isang Pagkakamali	GMA Playlist		
2022	Prima Donnas: Original Soundtrack	Huwag Kang Susuko	GMA Playlist	Theme song of Prima Donnas season 2 (Originally performed by Golden Cañedo for the first season)	

== Filmography ==
Television
Year	Title	Role	Notes	Ref.
2024	It's Showtime	Herself	Guest	
2024	Amazing Earth	Herself	Guest	
2024	TiktoClock: Tanghalan ng Kampeon	Herself	Judge	
2023	NCAA Season 99: Opening Ceremony	Herself	Performer	
2023; 2024	Fast Talk with Boy Abunda	Herself	Guest	
2023	The Clash season 5	Herself	Season 3 grand champion / Guest / Non-competition performer	
2022–23	Kapuso Countdown to 2023: Gayo Daejeon	Herself	Performer / Co-host	
2022; 2023; 2024	TiktoClock	Herself	Guest Performer / Player	
2022	NCAA Season 98: Opening Ceremony	Herself	Performer	
2022	Shopee 9.9. Super Shopping Day TV Special	Herself	Performer	
2022	Eat Bulaga!	Herself	Guest (Bawal Judgemental segment)	
2022	NCAA Season 98: GMA NCAA All-Star Basketball Game	Herself	Performer	
2022	NCAA Season 97: Opening Ceremony	Herself	Performer	
2022	Family Feud Philippines	Herself	Contestant / Team All-Out Sundays	
2021–22	Kapuso Countdown to 2022: The GMA New Year Special	Herself	Performer	
2021	Paskong Pangarap: The 2021 GMA Christmas Special	Herself	Performer	
2021	The Clash season 4	Herself	Season 3 grand champion / Guest / Non-competition performer	
2021; 2022–present	The Boobay and Tekla Show	Herself	Guest (2021–22; 2023); Co-host / Mema Squad member (since 2022)	
2021; 2022	Sarap 'Di Ba?	Herself	Guest	
2021	NCAA Season 96: Opening Ceremony	Herself	Performer	
2020–21	Kapuso Countdown to 2021: The GMA New Year Special	Herself	Performer	
2020	The Clash Christmas Special: Pasko Para Sa Lahat	Herself	Performer	
2020; 2021–present	All-Out Sundays	Herself	Guest (2020); Performer / Co-host / Various roles (since 2021)	
2020	The Clash season 3	Herself	Contestant / Grand Champion	
2020; 2021; 2022	Mars Pa More	Herself	Guest	

== Concert ==
Date	Title	Co-headliners	Venue	Ref.
December 2, 2023	Queendom: Live	Julie Anne San Jose, Rita Daniela, Hannah Precillas, Thea Astley, Mariane Osabel	Newport Performing Arts Theater	

== Awards ==
Year	Award	Category	Nominated work	Result	Ref.
2022	35th Awit Awards	Best Performance by a New Female Recording Artist	Ako Naman	Won	
2023	National Customer's Choice Annual Awards	Outstanding New Female Recording Artist		Won	

Awards and achievements
Preceded by Jeremiah Tiangco	The Clash; 2020 (season 3)	Succeeded by Mariane Osabel
