= Miah Tiangco =

Filipino actor and singer (born 1997)

- Born: Jeremiah Christian Castor Tiangco; August 5, 1997 (age 29); Imus, Cavite, Philippines
- Occupations: Singer; entrepreneur; actor
- Years active: 2016–present
- Agent: Sparkle GMA Artist Center (2020–25)
- Known for: Tawag ng Tanghalan; The Clash; All-Out Sundays; ASAP
- Height: 1.75 m (5 ft 9 in)
- Children: 1
- Musical career
- Genres: Pop; RnB
- Instruments: vocals; guitar; piano
- Labels: GMA Music (2020–25); ABS-CBN Music (2025–present)

Jeremiah "Miah" Christian Castor Tiangco (born August 5, 1997) is a Filipino singer, entrepreneur and actor. He rose to prominence after winning the second season of the singing competition The Clash in 2019.

Tiangco first appeared on Tawag ng Tanghalan in 2016 and 2017 as a defending champion, and later returned in 2025 for its special edition, All-Star Grand Resbak, and Duets 2, alongside Eunice Encarnada.

He is currently one of the members of a Filipino boy group 4Play.

== Career ==
Tiangco started out as a contender in Tawag ng Tanghalan, a competition segment in a noontime variety show It's Showtime, where he managed to be a two-time defending champion in the first two seasons.

Tiangco initially auditioned for the inaugural season of The Clash, but was rejected until a year later, advancing in the second season, where he was declared a grand champion after performing Fantasia’s “I Believe” in the finals. His victory earned him P1 million cash prize, a house and lot, a car, and an exclusive management contract with GMA Network.

Tiangco became a regular performer on the variety show All-Out Sundays, which began airing in January 2020, where he performed both solo and collaborative numbers with other artists.

On April 15, 2023, Tiangco held his first major concert entitled Dare to Be Different, where he also served as a co-director, in collaboration with Lee Junio Gasid.

In 2025, Tiangco made his first acting role in Mga Batang Riles, but almost a month, he silently departed from GMA Network and its shows to participate in Tawag ng Tanghalan: All-Star Grand Resbak, as one of the returning contestants from previous seasons. After the competition, a boy band named "4Play" is formed, where Tiangco is one of the members, along with fellow participants, Ian Manibale, Eich Abando, and Mark Justo. Tiangco competed again in the second season of Tawag ng Tanghalan: Duets, with Eunice Encarnada as his partner under the tandem 'Dugong Bughaw'.

== Personal life ==
In March 2025, Tiangco announced on the noontime competition program Tawag ng Tanghalan that he and his longtime partner were expecting their first child, a son to be named Raya Lux. He also stated that his decision to return to the contest was motivated by a desire to inspire his child by continuing to pursue his musical career.

== Business ==
In 2022, Tiangco launched his own café enterprise, named Biyaya Café, located in Imus, Cavite. The café features a design with industrial elements complemented by boho accents such as rattan chairs and palm-straw chandeliers, reflecting his personal taste. He publicly announced the investment and opening of Biyaya Café as a milestone for his career beyond music, expressing gratitude to his supporters and stating that this initial venture is “just the start”.

== Performances ==
The Clash season 2 performances
Episode	Date	Song	Links
4	September 29, 2019	The House of the Rising Sun	"Jeremiah Tiangco's world-class performance of “House of the Rising Sun” The Clash"
9	October 19, 2019	Bulag, Pipi at Bingi	"The Clash 2019: Jeremiah Tiangco’s stunning performance of “Bulag, Pipi at Bingi” Top 32"
15	November 9, 2019	Hello	"The Clash: Jeremiah Tiangco & Nef Medina's near perfect performance of "Hello""
18	November 17, 2019	Kathang Isip	"The Clash 2019: Jeremiah Tiangco performs "Kathang Isip" with a twist Top 12"
19	November 23, 2019	End of the Road	"The Clash: Is it the "End of The Road" for Jeremiah Tiangco?"
21	November 30, 2019	Grown-Up Christmas List	
23	December 7, 2019	Greatest Love of All	"The Clash: Jeremiah Tiangco's version of "The Greatest Love of All"
25	December 14, 2019	All I Ask, When I Was Your Man, That's What I Like	"The Clash: Jeremiah Tiangco delivers his best performance yet with a Bruno Mars medley"
26 (Grand Finals)	December 15, 2019	I Believe I Can Fly and Set Fire to the Rain	"The Clash: Jeremiah Tiangco's Top 5 performance (I Believe I Can Fly & Set Fire To The Rain)"
26 (Grand Finals)	December 15, 2019	I Believe	"The Clash 2019 = Jeremiah Tiangco bares it all with I Believe Final Clash"

== Discography ==
Singles
Year	Title	Featured singer	Composer(s)	Label	Album/EP	Notes	Source
2025	Minahal Pala Kita	N/A	Kiko KIKX Salazar/Derick OC-J Gernale	Star Music	KIKXV: Volume 2		
2024	Bakit Andali Sayo	N/A	JFM	Philos Karpos Music	N/A		
2024	Do You Want To Do This	N/A	Rina Mercado	Miss Universe Records	N/A	Played during Miss Universe 2023 evening gown competition	
2023	Paa (Paa-kap)	N/A	Himself	Independent	N/A		
2022	214	N/A	Rico Blanco	GMA Playlist	Lolong (Original Soundtrack)	Lolong season 1 theme song	
2022	Ano'ng Sabe?	N/A	Simon Tan	GMA Music	N/A	Family Feud theme song	
2022	Love and Hope Together	Thea Astley	Emman Rivera	GMA Music	N/A	GMA Network's Kapuso Month/Valentines 2022 jingle	
2021	Sa Tuwing Umuulan	N/A	Arnie Mendaros	GMA Music	N/A		
2021	pUSo Together this Summer	N/A	Natasha Correos	GMA Music	N/A	GMA Network's Summer 2021 jingle	
2021	Pusong Pinoy, Magpakailanman	Thea Astley	Senedy Que and Simon Tan	GMA Playlist	N/A	Magpakailanman theme song (until 2022)	
2020	Titulo	N/A	Vehnee Saturno, Ebe Dancel, Jungee Marcelo, and Top Suzara	GMA Music	N/A	The Clash season 2 victory song, debut single	

== Filmography ==
Television
Year	Title	Role	Notes	Source
2025–present	ASAP	Himself	Guest Performer	
2025	Pinoy Big Brother: Celebrity Collab Edition: The Big Night	Himself	TNT Resbaker / Guest Performer	
2025	Mga Batang Riles	Riot	Recurring role	
2024–25	Kapuso Countdown to 2025: Isa sa Puso	Himself	Performer	
2024–25	It's Showtime	Himself	Guest Performer	
2024	Pera Paraan	Himself	Guest	
2023–24	Kapuso Countdown to 2024: The GMA New Year Special	Himself	Performer	
2023	The Clash season 5	Himself	Season 2 grand champion / Guest / Non-competition performer	
2022–25	TiktoClock	Himself	Guest Performer / Player	
2022	NCAA Season 98: Opening Ceremony	Himself	Performer	
2022; 2024	Family Feud	Himself	Contestant / Team The Clash Boys (2022); Team AOS (2024)	
2022	NCAA Season 97: Battle of Intramuros	Himself	Half-time performer	
2022	NCAA Season 97: Opening Ceremony	Himself	Performer	
2022; 2023	The Boobay and Tekla Show	Himself	Guest	
2021–22	Kapuso Countdown To 2022: The GMA New Year Special	Himself	Performer	
2021	Paskong Pangarap: The 2021 GMA Christmas Special	Himself	Performer	
2021	Eat Bulaga!	Himself	Bawal Judgemental celebrity guest	
2021	The Clash season 4	Himself	Season 2 grand champion / Guest / Non-competition performer	
2021	NCAA Season 96: Closing Ceremony	Himself	Performer	
2021	NCAA Season 96: Opening Ceremony	Himself	Performer	
2021	Taste Buddies	Himself	Guest	
2021	The Clash Flashback Specials	Himself		
2021	Centerstage	Himself	Guest	
2021	Catch Me Out Philippines	Himself	Celebrity Catcher	
2020–21	Kapuso Countdown To 2021: The GMA New Year Special	Himself	Performer	
2020	The Clash Christmas Special: Pasko Para Sa Lahat	Himself	Performer	
2020	The Clash season 3	Himself	Season 2 grand champion / Guest / Non-competition Performer	
2020	Wowowin	Himself	Guest / Performer	
2020	Idol sa Kusina	Himself	Guest	
2020; 2021; 2022	MARS Pa More	Himself	Guest / Performer	
2020–25	All-Out Sundays	Himself	Performer / Co-host	
2019–20	Kapuso Countdown To 2020: The GMA New Year Special	Himself	Performer	
2019	Sunday PinaSaya	Himself	Guest / Performer	
2019; 2022	Unang Hirit	Himself	Guest / Performer	
2019; 2022	Sarap 'Di Ba?	Himself	Guest / Performer	
2019	The Clash season 2	Himself	Contestant / Grand Champion	
2016; 2017; 2025–26	Tawag ng Tanghalan	Himself	Contestant	

== Concerts ==
Date	Title	Venue
August 16, 2025	All-Star Grand Resbak: The Concert	New Frontier Theater, Quezon City, Metro Manila, Philippines
April 15, 2023	Dare to Be Different	Music Museum, San Juan City, Philippines

== Awards and nominations ==
Year	Award	Category	Nominated work	Result	Source
2022	13th PMPC Star Awards for Music	New Male Recording Artist of the Year	Titulo	Won	
2022	35th Awit Awards	New Male Recording Artist of the Year	Titulo	Nominated	
2020	33rd Aliw Awards	Best New Artist	N/A	Nominated	
2017	World Championships of Performing Arts	Variety	Unknown	Won	
2017	World Championships of Performing Arts	RnB and Pop	Unknown	Won	
2017	World Championships of Performing Arts	Team Production Presentation	Unknown	Won	

Awards and achievements
Preceded by Golden Cañedo	The Clash; 2019 (season 2)	Succeeded by Jessica Villarubin
