= Split decision =

Type of winning criterion in boxing

A split decision (SD) is a winning criterion in boxing, most commonly in full-contact combat sports, in which two of the three judges score one particular competitor as the winner, while the third judge scores for the other competitor.

A split decision is different from a majority decision. A majority decision occurs when two judges pick the same competitor as the winner, and the third judge scores the contest a draw (tie). The official result remains the same in both split and majority decisions, but the margin of victory is greater in a majority decision and less in a split decision.

Occasionally, the judges' final decision is a tie, because the first judge scores for one competitor, the second one scores for the other competitor, and the third judge scores the contest a draw (tie); so in this case the official result is a split draw.

Often, a split decision causes controversy due to its lack of unanimity. As a result, especially in high-profile or title fights, the victor may be encouraged or pressured to grant a rematch, in the hopes a return match-up will have a more decisive outcome.

== Notable examples from boxing ==
| Date | Fight | Scorecards | | | Source(s) |
|---|---|---|---|---|---|
| December 5, 1947 | Joe Louis vs. Jersey Joe Walcott | 9–6 Louis | 8–6–1 Louis | 7–6–2 Walcott | |
| March 31, 1973 | Muhammad Ali vs. Ken Norton | 7–4 Norton | 5–4 Norton | 6–5 Ali | |
| September 10, 1973 | Ken Norton vs. Muhammad Ali II | 7–5 Ali | 6–5 Ali | 6–5 Norton | |
| February 15, 1978 | Muhammad Ali vs. Leon Spinks | 145–140 Spinks | 144–141 Spinks | 143–142 Ali | |
| April 6, 1987 | Marvin Hagler vs. Sugar Ray Leonard | 118–110 Leonard | 115–113 Leonard | 115–113 Hagler | |
| May 5, 2007 | Oscar De La Hoya vs. Floyd Mayweather Jr. | 116–112 Mayweather | 115–113 Mayweather | 115–113 De La Hoya | |
| March 15, 2008 | Juan Manuel Márquez vs. Manny Pacquiao II | 115–112 Pacquiao | 114–113 Pacquiao | 115–112 Marquez | |
| April 19, 2008 | Bernard Hopkins vs. Joe Calzaghe | 116–111 Calzaghe | 115–112 Calzaghe | 114–113 Hopkins | |
| December 10, 2011 | Amir Khan vs. Lamont Peterson | 113–112 Peterson | 113–112 Peterson | 115–110 Khan | |
| June 9, 2012 | Manny Pacquiao vs. Timothy Bradley | 115–113 Bradley | 115–113 Bradley | 115–113 Pacquiao | |
| March 1, 2014 | Orlando Salido vs. Vasiliy Lomachenko | 116–112 Salido | 115–113 Salido | 115–113 Lomachenko | |
| July 12, 2014 | Canelo Álvarez vs. Erislandy Lara | 117–111 Álvarez | 115–113 Álvarez | 115–113 Lara | |
| December 10, 2016 | Dillian Whyte vs. Derek Chisora | 115–113 Whyte | 115–114 Whyte | 115–114 Chisora | |
| July 20, 2019 | Manny Pacquiao vs. Keith Thurman | 115–112 Pacquiao | 115–112 Pacquiao | 114–113 Thurman | |
| November 27, 2021 | Teófimo López vs. George Kambosos Jr. | 115–111 Kambosos | 115–112 Kambosos | 114–113 López | |
| February 26, 2022 | Josh Taylor vs. Jack Catterall | 114–111 Taylor | 113–112 Taylor | 113–112 Catterall | |
| April 30, 2022 | Katie Taylor vs. Amanda Serrano | 97–93 Taylor | 96–93 Taylor | 96–94 Serrano | |
| August 20, 2022 | Oleksandr Usyk vs. Anthony Joshua II | 116–112 Usyk | 115–113 Usyk | 115–113 Joshua | |
| May 18, 2024 | Tyson Fury vs. Oleksandr Usyk | 115–112 Usyk | 114–113 Usyk | 114–113 Fury | |
| April 4, 2026 | Derek Chisora vs. Deontay Wilder | 115–111 Wilder | 115–113 Wilder | 115–112 Chisora | |

== Outside of boxing ==
In the Philippines, the term "split decision" is also used on GMA Network's reality television show The Clash, when two of the three members of the clash panel (Ai-Ai delas Alas, Christian Bautista, and Lani Misalucha) chose a clasher (among two) to advance to the next round, while the other clasher is eliminated. An example of it is that Golden Cañedo won the clash against Fatima Espiritu via split decision. Cañedo was later the Clash grand winner of the show's first season.

== See also ==
- 10 Point System
