= Jennie Gabriel =

Filipino singer

- Born: Jennie Escalada Gabriel; August 11, 1987 (age 39); Makati, Philippines
- Occupations: Singer, Actress, Host, Comedian and Impersonator
- Years active: 2006–present
- Agent: Sparkle (2006–2009; 2021–present)
- Known for: Pinoy Pop Superstar; Tawag ng Tanghalan; The Clash 2020 (season 3)

Jennie Escalada Gabriel (born 11 August 1987) is a Filipino singer, actress, comedienne, and television personality. She first rose to prominence after being one of the finalists of various singing competitions such as ABS-CBN's Tawag ng Tanghalan, GMA's Pinoy Pop Superstar, and The Clash, where she ended as the season's first runner-up.

== Life and career ==
=== Early beginnings ===
Gabriel was first introduced as Jennie Escalada when she joined the third season of Pinoy Pop Superstar in 2006 where she was one of the grand finalists.

In 2016, Gabriel competed in the first season of ABS-CBN's singing competition, Tawag ng Tanghalan where she was an eight-time defending champion and became one of the grand finalists. During the course of the competition, she also showcased her skills in impersonating television and music personalities such as actress Angel Locsin. This comedic skill opened a lot of projects for Gabriel in the network such as roles in Celebrity Playtime, Dok Ricky, Pedia, and The Good Son.

In 2019, a viral video of Gabriel surfaced with her impersonating Filipino music personalities such as Jaya, Lani Misalucha, and Vina Morales. She was later dubbed as the "Diva with a Million Voices" and had several television guestings of her showcasing this skill.

=== The Clash and signing up with GMA Network ===
In 2020, Gabriel competed in the third season of GMA Network's The Clash. She was the first one to eliminated but got back in the competition after being the wildcard and eventually ended as the season's runner-up.

After the competition, Gabriel was signed by GMA Artist Center and later joined the musical variety show, All-Out Sundays, wherein she is now a mainstay performer.

== The Clash 2020 (season 3) Full Performances ==
Episode	Date	Song	Youtube Performance
1	October 3, 2020	Alone	"Jennie Gabriel - Alone The Clash Season 3"
7	October 24, 2020	Nosi Ba Lasi	"Jennie Gabriel is a clear frontrunner with 'Nosi Balasi' The Clash Season 3"
12	November 8, 2020	The Prayer (with Cholo Bismonte)	"Jennie Gabriel and Cholo Bismonte stun everyone with "The Prayer" masterpiece The Clash Season 3"
15	November 21, 2020	I Am Changing/ And I Am Telling You I'm Not Going (with Jessica Villarubin, Audrey Mortilla, and Shannen Montero)	"LAKAMBINI sets the bar high The Clash Season 3"
17	November 28, 2020	Titanium	"Jennie Gabriel ends on a high note with "Titanium" The Clash Season 3"
20	December 6, 2020	Hindi Na Nga	"Jennie Gabriel displays impressive musicality with "Hindi Na Nga" The Clash Season 3"
21	December 12, 2020	Isang Pangarap	"Jennie Gabriel becomes a great storyteller with "Isang Pangarap" The Clash Season 3"
23	December 19, 2020	Never Enough, Listen	"Jennie Gabriel receives another standing ovation w/ 'Never Enough' & 'Listen' The Clash Season 3"
24- Grand Finale	December 20, 2020	One Moment in Time	"Jennie Gabriel - One Moment in Time The Final Clash"
24- Grand Finale	December 20, 2020	All By Myself vs. Jessica Villarubin's Hanggang May Buhay	"Jennie Gabriel gives her all with "All By Myself" The Clash Season 3" vs. "Jessica Villarubin wins The Clash Season 3 with "Habang May Buhay" The Clash 2020"

== Filmography ==
=== Television ===
Year	Title	Role	Notes
2025–2026	Cruz vs Cruz	Alice	Supporting Cast
2025	Maka	Alelie	Supporting Cast
2024	Asawa ng Asawa Ko	Connie	Guest cast
2022–2023	Unica Hija	Trixie	Supporting cast
2022	Family Feud	Herself	Guest Player
2022	Mars Pa More	Herself	Guest
2022	Sarap, 'Di Ba?	Herself	Guest
2022	Daig Kayo Ng Lola Ko: My Ex's Wedding	Good Vibes Bee	
2021–2022	Kapuso Countdown to 2022: The GMA New Year Special	Herself	Performer
2021–2022	I Left My Heart in Sorsogon	Mylene "May–May" Regor	Supporting cast
2021	Tadhana: Maid 4 U	Chloe	
2021	Dear Uge: Soul ni Sol	Dora	
2021	Wish Ko Lang!	Grace	
2021–present	The Boobay and Tekla Show	Herself	Mema Squad
2021	Catch Me Out Philippines	Herself	Celebrity Catcher
2020; 2021–present	All-Out Sundays	Herself	Guest (2020); Performer (since 2021)
2020	The Clash	Herself	Season 3 contestant / runner up
2019; 2021	Wowowin	Herself	Willie of Fortune contestant (2019); Guest co-host (2021)
2017	The Good Son	Britney	Recurring cast
2016	Celebrity Playtime	Herself	Guest Player
2016	Dok Ricky, Pedia	Lian	
2016	Tawag ng Tanghalan	Herself	Contestant
2009	Eat Bulaga!	Herself	
2007	Ratsada E	Herself	
2006	Pinoy Pop Superstar	Herself	Contestant
