= Joyce Pring =

Filipino host (born 1993)

- Born: Princess Joyce Pring; May 4, 1993 (age 33); Tondo, Manila, Philippines
- Education: University of Perpetual Help System DALTA (BA)
- Occupations: Radio and television host
- Years active: 2011–present
- Spouse: Juancho Triviño (m. 2020)
- Children: 3

Princess Joyce Pring-Triviño (born May 4, 1993) is a Filipino radio and television personality. Born in Tondo, Manila, she began hosting as a video jockey after winning at Myx VJ Search in 2011. After leaving Magic 89.9 as a radio jockey in 2018, Pring later hosted television shows The Clash and Unang Hirit, and the podcast Adulting with Joyce Pring that year.

== Early life ==
Princess Joyce Pring, one of two siblings, was born on May 4, 1993, in Tondo, Manila. Her mother is a registered nurse, while her father was a Manila Police District officer. She grew up in Tondo and Sta. Mesa, Manila. After her father was assassinated by members of the Alex Boncayao Brigade, Pring was raised by her stepfather who is a graphic designer. She was a graduate of Quezon City Science High School and enrolled in University of the Philippines Diliman College of Fine Arts in 2010 but later stopped due to financial difficulties. Pring graduated from the University of Perpetual Help System DALTA in July 2025 with a Bachelor of Arts degree in communication.

== Career ==
In 2011, Pring participated in the Myx VJ Search and won as a video jockey. The noontime show Eat Bulaga! marked Pring's first disc jockey stint with the Trip Na Trip segment in 2014. She was also a radio jockey with Magic 89.9 from 2016 to 2018. Pring signed a network deal with GMA Network in 2017; her subsequent projects included hosting the online program of the special 2018 GMA New Year Countdown: Buong Puso Para sa Kapuso, serving as a journey presenter on the first season of the television talent show The Clash, and being part of the morning show Unang Hirit. Since 2018, she hosted the podcast Adulting with Joyce Pring.

== Personal life ==
Pring was in a relationship with host Sam Y.G.; the pair broke up in 2017, though they have remained friends. She and actor Juancho Triviño are in a relationship since May 2019. They became engaged that August, (Note: Publicly recognized in November 2019) and married in Pasay in February 2020. The couple have three children.

== Discography ==
=== Singles ===
- 2014 - "Tulala"
- 2019 - "Baka Sakali" (with Rico Blanco)
- 2020 - "Alone Together"

== Filmography ==
=== Television ===
Year	Title	Role	Ref.
2011–2012	Various Myx shows	Herself / VJ Joyce	
2014	Eat Bulaga!	Herself / DJ Joyce	
2018	The Clash	Journey host (season 1)	
2018–2019	Unang Hirit	Segment co-host	

=== Web shows ===
Year	Title	Role	Ref.
2012	Tales from the Friend Zone	Herself	
2015–2016	Tanods	Winona	
2016	Sabagay Life	Jackie	
2017–2018	2018 GMA New Year Countdown: Buong Puso Para sa Kapuso (online program)	Online host	
2018	GMA One Exclusives: All Access	Host	
2019	Stand for Truth	Segment host	

== Podcast series ==
Year	Title	Role	Ref.
2018–present	Adulting With Joyce Pring	Host	

== Audiobook ==
Year	Title	Role	Ref.
2018	Dear Universe: Poems on Love, Longing, and Finding Your Place in the Cosmos	Narrator	

== Radio ==
Year	Title	Role	Ref.
2016–2018	The Rundown / Top 5@5	Herself	
