= All-Out Sundays =

Philippine television variety show

- Title card since 2026
- Also known as: AOS; AyOS
- Genre: Variety show
- Written by: Rommel Gacho; Vincent de Jesus; Mcoy Fundales
- Directed by: Miguel "Miggy" Tanchanco
- Creative directors: Caesar Cosme; Rommel Gacho
- Presented by: Alden Richards; Julie Anne San Jose; Rayver Cruz; Ken Chan; Rita Daniela; Gabbi Garcia; Christian Bautista; Aicelle Santos; Mark Bautista; Glaiza de Castro; Paolo Contis; Betong Sumaya; Miguel Tanfelix; Derrick Monasterio; Migo Adecer; Kyline Alcantara; Cassy Legaspi; Mavy Legaspi; Lexi Gonzales; Garrett Bolden; Golden Cañedo; Thea Astley; Jeremiah Tiangco; Jong Madaliday; Joaquin Domagoso; Kim de Leon; Shayne Sava; Vince Crisostomo; Radson Flores; Karl Aquino; Abdul Raman; Kakai Bautista; Boobay; Super Tekla; Allen Ansay; Ysabel Ortega; Sofia Pablo; Jessica Villarubin; Hannah Precillas; Sanya Lopez; Mariane Osabel; Zephanie
- Narrated by: Thea Astley
- Opening theme: "All-Out Sundays"
- Ending theme: "All-Out Sundays"
- Country of origin: Philippines
- Original language: Tagalog

Production
- Executive producers: Paul Lester M. Chia; Reylie Manalo; Aileen Victoria Tandang
- Production locations: Studio 7, GMA Network Studios Annex, Quezon City, Philippines
- Camera setup: Multiple-camera setup
- Running time: 90–150 minutes
- Production company: GMA Entertainment Group

Original release
- Network: GMA Network
- Release: January 5, 2020 – present

All-Out Sundays (also known as AOS or AyOS) is a Philippine television variety show broadcast by GMA Network. Directed by Miguel "Miggy" Tanchanco, it was originally starred by Alden Richards, Julie Anne San Jose, Rayver Cruz, Ken Chan, Rita Daniela, Gabbi Garcia, Christian Bautista, Aicelle Santos, Mark Bautista, Glaiza de Castro, Paolo Contis, Betong Sumaya, Miguel Tanfelix, Derrick Monasterio, Migo Adecer, Kyline Alcantara, Cassy Legaspi, Mavy Legaspi, Lexi Gonzales, Garrett Bolden, Golden Cañedo, Thea Astley, Jeremiah Tiangco, Jong Madaliday, Joaquin Domagoso, Kim de Leon, Shayne Sava, Vince Crisostomo, Radson Flores, Karl Aquino, Abdul Raman, Kakai Bautista, Boobay and Super Tekla. It premiered on January 5, 2020, on the network's Sunday Grande sa Hapon line up. San Jose, Cruz, Chan, Daniela, Christian Bautista, Mark Bautista, Tanfelix, Monasterio, Alcantara, Gonzales, Bolden, Astley, Sanya Lopez, Ysabel Ortega, Sofia Pablo, Allen Ansay, Zephanie, Michael Sager, Sean Lucas, Patrick Quiroz, John Rex Baculfo, Mariane Osabel, Jessica Villarubin and Hannah Precillas currently serve as the cast.

The show is originally titled as All-Out Sunday. It is streaming online on YouTube, Facebook and TikTok.

== Overview ==
All-Out Sundays is under the direction of Miguel "Miggy" Tanchanco. The creative team is composed of creative directors, Caesar Cosme and Rommel Gacho. The latter is also the headwriter, along with Mcoy Fundales. Rem Zamora served as the stage director.

The cast from the variety shows Sunday PinaSaya and Studio 7, along with the winners and contestants of the reality competition show The Clash, were carried over to join the show.

In March 2020, the admission of a live audience in the studio and production were suspended due to the enhanced community quarantine in Luzon caused by the COVID-19 pandemic. The show resumed through livestreaming on YouTube and Facebook as All-Out Sundays: The Stay Home Party. It resumed original television programming on July 12, 2020. The show returned to studio filming on September 27, 2020.

Singer Lani Misalucha joined the show on January 31, 2021. On February 14, 2021, actress Barbie Forteza also joined the show. On April 24, 2022, the live audience was brought back into the show.

== Cast ==
Cast

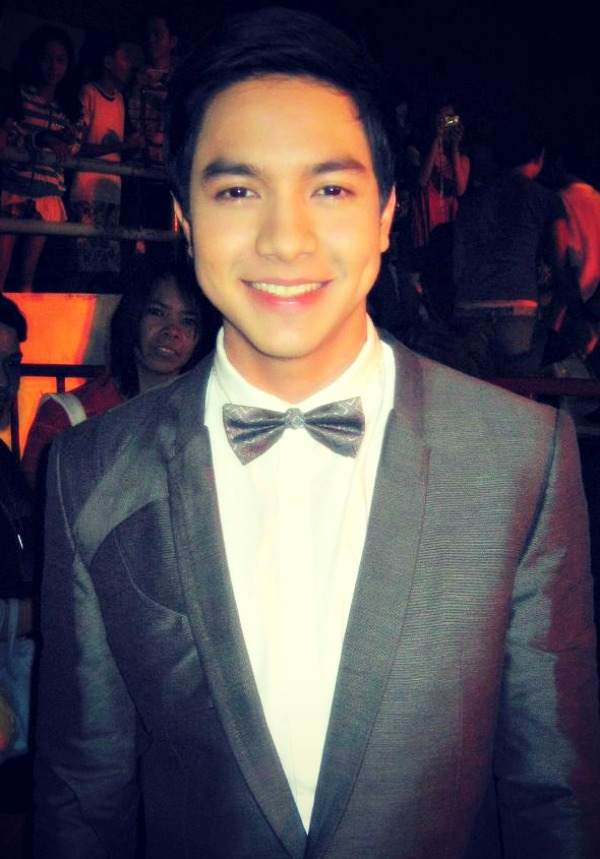
Alden Richards

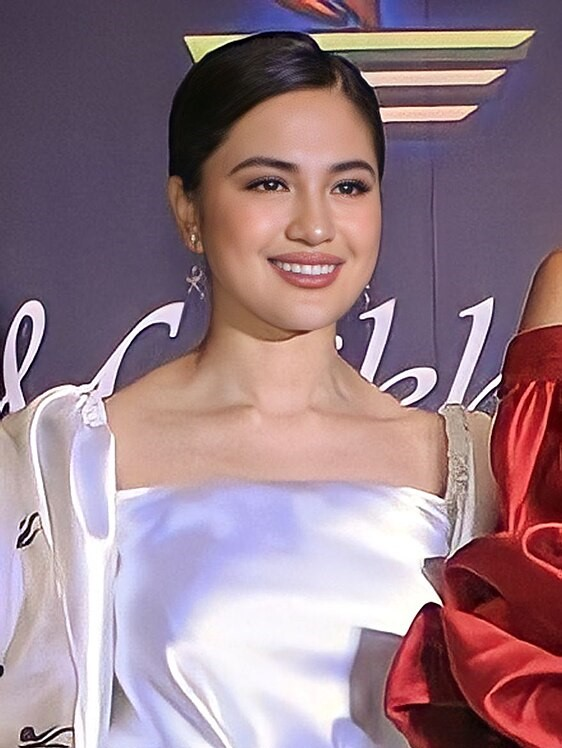
Julie Anne San Jose

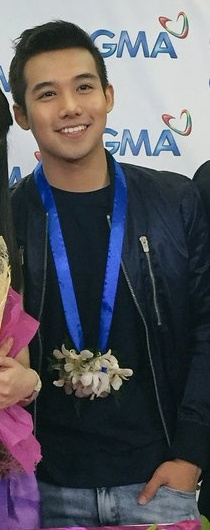
Ken Chan

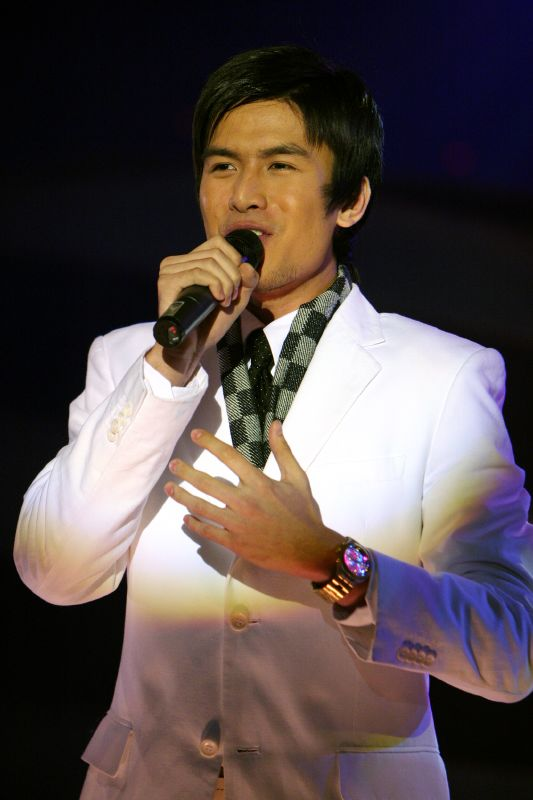
Christian Bautista

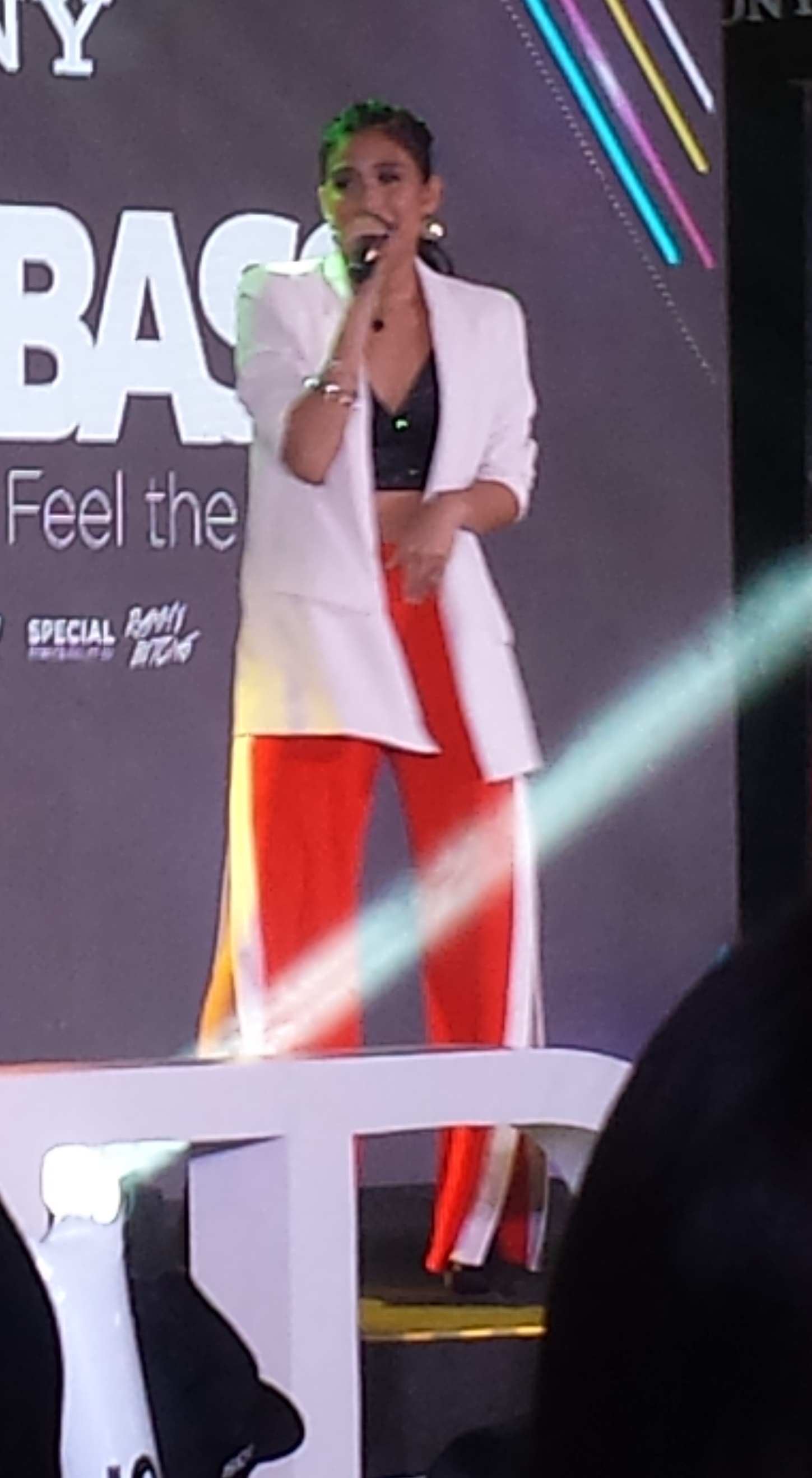
Gabbi Garcia

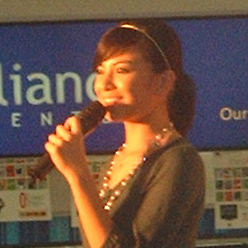
Glaiza de Castro

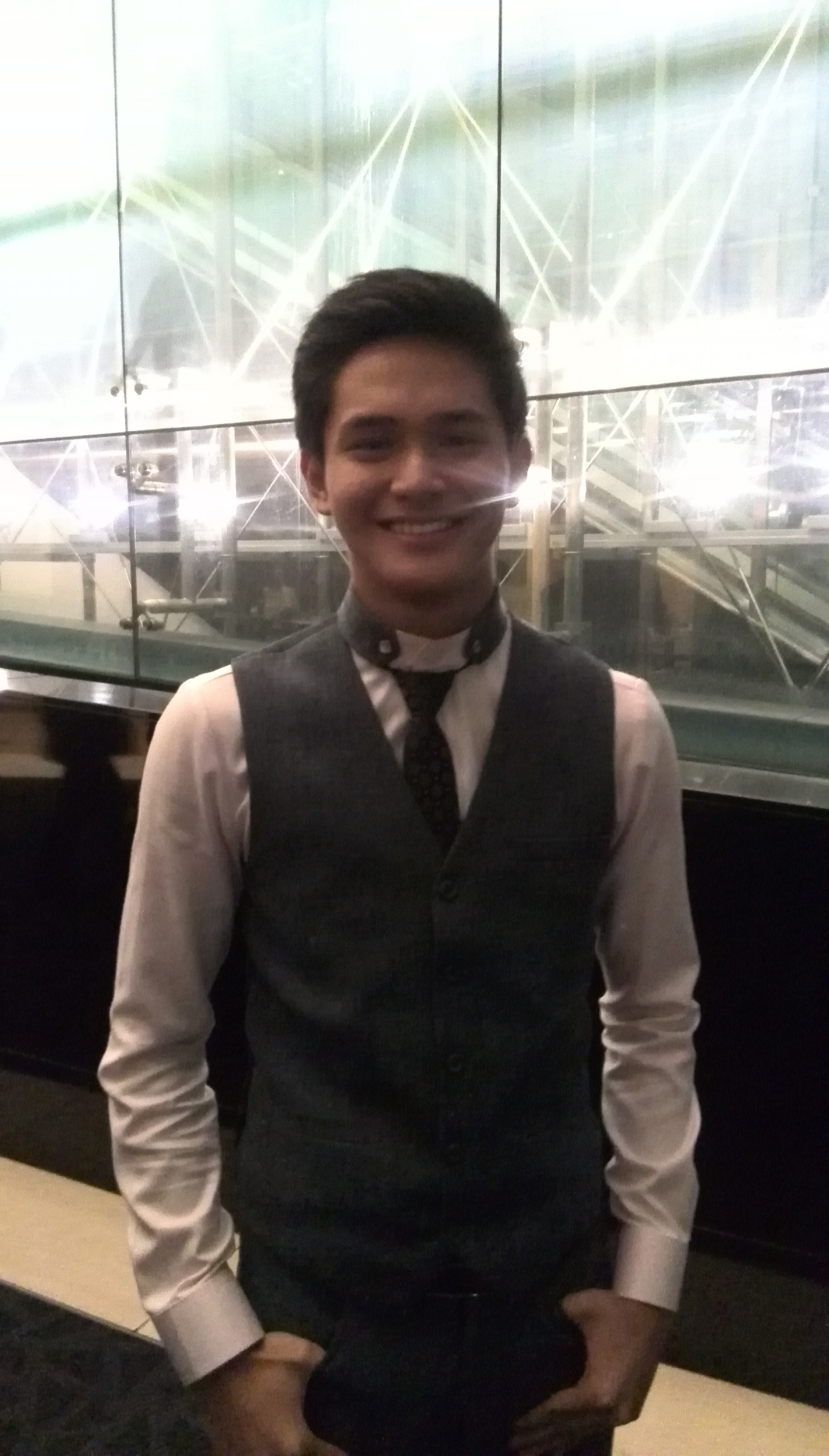
Ruru Madrid

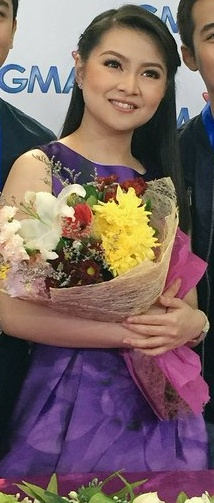
Barbie Forteza

The regular cast members of All-Out Sundays, as of March 17, 2024:

- Julie Anne San Jose (since 2020)
- Rayver Cruz (since 2020)
- Ken Chan (since 2020)
- Rita Daniela (since 2020)
- Sanya Lopez (since 2022)
- Derrick Monasterio (since 2020)
- Miguel Tanfelix (since 2020)
- Ysabel Ortega (since 2021)
- Kyline Alcantara (since 2020)
- Sofia Pablo (since 2021)
- Allen Ansay (since 2020)
- Lexi Gonzales (since 2020)
- Zephanie (since 2022)
- Thea Astley (since 2020)
- Christian Bautista (since 2020)
- Mark Bautista (since 2020)
- Michael Sager (since 2022)
- Sean Lucas (since 2022)
- Patrick Quiroz (since 2022)
- Garrett Bolden (since 2020)
- John Rex Baculfo (since 2023)
- Mariane Osabel (since 2022)
- Jessica Villarubin (since 2021)
- Hannah Precillas (since 2021)

Co-hosts, performers and occasional guests

- Gabbi Garcia (2020–23; since 2024)
- Joaquin Domagoso (2020–23; since 2024)
- Radson Flores (2020–23; since 2024)
- Abdul Raman (2020–22; since 2024)
- Shayne Sava (2020–23; since 2024)
- Zonia Mejia (since 2020)
- Jamir Zabarte (since 2020)
- Mitzi Josh (since 2021)
- Sandro Muhlach (since 2021)
- Hannah Arguelles (2021; since 2024)
- Vince Maristela (since 2022)
- Raheel Bhyria (since 2022)
- Anjay Anson (since 2022)
- Jeff Moses (since 2022)
- Vanessa Peña (since 2022)
- Larkin Castor (since 2022)
- Saviour Ramos (since 2022)
- Roxie Smith (since 2022)
- Cheska Fausto (since 2022)
- Kirsten Gonzales (since 2022)
- Shuvee Etrata (since 2023)
- Jong Madaliday (2020–21;since 2025)

Musicians

- Marc Lopez - musical director / arranger / 1st keyboard (since 2020)
- Niño Regalado - drums / arranger (since 2020)
- Jem Florendo - 2nd keyboard / arranger (since 2020)
- Noel Mendez - acoustic guitar (2020)
- Gerald Flores - bass guitar (since 2020)
- Soc Mina - bass guitar (2020)
- Sushi Reyes - backup singer (since 2020)
- Manolo Tanquilut - backup singer (2020–22)
- Vincent de Jesus - Comedy musical director / arranger (2020–24)
- Cezar Aguas - acoustic guitar (since 2022)

Former cast

- Alden Richards (2020–23)
- Aicelle Santos (2020–23)
- Glaiza de Castro (2020–23)
- Paolo Contis (2020–23)
- Betong Sumaya (2020–23)
- Kakai Bautista (2020–23)
- Boobay (2020–23)
- Super Tekla (2020)
- Migo Adecer (2020–21)
- Cassy Legaspi (2020–21)
- Mavy Legaspi (2020–23)
- Kim de Leon (2020–23)
- Golden Cañedo (2020–21)
- Vince Crisostomo (2020–23)
- Karl Aquino (2020)
- Jak Roberto (2020)
- Ruru Madrid (2020–23)
- Paul Salas (2020–22)
- Lani Misalucha (2021–22)
- Khalil Ramos (2020–23)
- Barbie Forteza (2021–23)
- Bianca Umali (2021–23)
- Andrei Sison (2023)
- Jeremiah Tiangco (2020-2024)/The OGs/OG Cuties (since 2020)
- Divas of the Queendom (since 2021)
- The Balladeers of Kingdom (since 2021)
- Sayaw-One (since 2021)
- Limitless (since 2021)
- Super Champions (2022; since 2023)
- P-Pop Power (since 2022)
- Majesty (since 2023)
- AOS Mismo (since 2023)

Defunct

- FTW: Four the Win (2020–21)
- Press Play (2020)
- Tapsikret (2020)
- Sing Kilig (2020–23)
- Familympics (2020)
- All-Out Stage (2020)
- Ano Raw?! (2020–21)
- Don't Me! (2020)
- Walang Talent Show (2020)
- Mass Dancing (2020)
- Pasa Mode (2020)
- Sana All: Hugot From the Heart (2020)
- Tara! Let's Duet (2020)
- Bentang-Benta (2020)
- Ang Drama Mo (2020)
- TikTok Battle (2020–21)
- All-Out Concert (2021)
- All-Star Assembly (2021)
- Cypher (2021)
- Eternal Flame (2021)
- All for Love (2021)
- Love Doctors (2021)
- I'm Byerna (2021)
- #FYP: Fresh Young Peeps (2021)
- Tik-Pak Boom! (2021)
- Isla Fantasia (2021)
- The Nightingale Sings (2021)
- Ka-Sing Style (2021–22)
  - Ka-Sing Style: Dance Edition (2022)
- Queendom X Kingdom (2021–23)
- Master Sessions (2021–22; 2023)
- AyOS Ang Pasko (2021)
- The Clash Originals (2022)
- Hulaoke (2022)
- Marites at Marisol/Marites at Marichu/Chismax Game (2022)
- Ibong Pak Na Pak (2022)
- Danserye (2022)
- Queen Beks (2022)
- Kung Sigurado Ka, Putukin Mo! (2022)
- Tune-Pak Na Pak! (2022–23)
- AyOS Lounge (2022–23)
- Tanging Treasure (2022)
- Move In, Move On (2022)
- GG Girls (2022)
- Scam Busters (2022–23)
- BarDagulan (2022–24)
  - BarDagulan Boys (2022–23)
  - BardaGurlan (2023)
  - BardaGayan (2023)
- Engkanto Academy (2023)
- Barkadaoke (2023–24)
- Version 2.0 (2023)
- Drag King (2023)
- My Ninang Fairy (2023)
- Royal High Blood (2023)
- Featured Sunday (2023)
- Witch Yaya (2023)
- Live Lip Sync Showdown (2023–24)
- Sing-Pabida (2023–24)
- Magandang Dalag (2024)
- V6 (2024)

== Ratings ==
According to AGB Nielsen Philippines' Nationwide Urban Television Audience Measurement People in Television Homes, the pilot episode of All-Out Sundays earned a 6.1% rating.

== Accolades ==
Accolades received by All-Out Sundays
| Year | Award | Category | Recipient | Result | Ref. |
|---|---|---|---|---|---|
| 2021 | 34th PMPC Star Awards for Television | Best New Female TV Personality | Shayne Sava | Nominated | |
| 2021 | 34th PMPC Star Awards for Television | Best New Female TV Personality | Thea Astley | Nominated | |
| 2021 | 34th PMPC Star Awards for Television | Best New Male TV Personality | Abdul Raman | Nominated | |
| 2021 | 34th PMPC Star Awards for Television | Best New Male TV Personality | Jerick Dolormente | Nominated | |
| 2021 | 34th PMPC Star Awards for Television | Best New Male TV Personality | Joaquin Domagoso | Won | |
| 2021 | 34th PMPC Star Awards for Television | Best New Male TV Personality | Kim de Leon | Nominated | |
| 2021 | 34th PMPC Star Awards for Television | Best New Male TV Personality | Radson Flores | Nominated | |
| 2021 | 34th PMPC Star Awards for Television | Best Variety Show | All-Out Sundays | Nominated | |
| 2021 | Asian Academy Creative Awards | Best General Entertainment or Quiz Programme | All-Out Sundays | Won | |
| 2023 | 35th PMPC Star Awards for Television | Best Variety Show | All-Out Sundays | Won | |
| 2023 | 35th PMPC Star Awards for Television | Best Female TV Host | Julie Anne San Jose | Nominated | |
| 2023 | 35th PMPC Star Awards for Television | Best New Male TV Personality | Sandro Muhlach | Nominated | |
| 2023 | 35th PMPC Star Awards for Television | Best New Female TV Personality | Pamela Prinster | Nominated | |
| 2024 | ContentAsia Awards | Best Variety Program | All-Out Sundays | Bronze | |
| 2025 | 37th PMPC Star Awards for Television | Best Female TV Host | Julie Anne San Jose | Nominated | |
| 2025 | 37th PMPC Star Awards for Television | Best Male TV Host | Alden Richards | Nominated | |
| 2025 | 37th PMPC Star Awards for Television | Best Variety Show | All-Out Sundays | Nominated | |
| 2025 | 38th PMPC Star Awards for Television | Best Variety Show | All-Out Sundays | Pending | |
