= TiktoClock =

Philippine television variety show

- Title card
- Genre: Variety show
- Written by: Venjie Pellena
- Directed by: Louie Ignacio
- Presented by: Kim Atienza; Pokwang; Rabiya Mateo; Jayson Gainza; Faith da Silva; Herlene Budol
- Theme music composer: Louie Ignacio
- Opening theme: "TiktoClock" by Kim Atienza, Pokwang, Rabiya Mateo, Jennie Gabriel and Garrett Bolden
- Ending theme: "TiktoClock" by Kim Atienza, Pokwang, Rabiya Mateo, Jennie Gabriel and Garrett Bolden
- Country of origin: Philippines
- Original language: Tagalog

Production
- Executive producer: Raymund Bigboy Villariza
- Production locations: German Moreno Studio, GMA Network Studios Annex, Quezon City, Philippines
- Editors: AC Ambrad; Erwin Logina; Jeck Pilpil
- Camera setup: Multiple-camera setup
- Running time: 20–40 minutes
- Production company: GMA Entertainment Group

Original release
- Network: GMA Network
- Release: July 25, 2022 – present

TiktoClock is a Philippine television variety show broadcast by GMA Network. Directed by Louie Ignacio, it was originally hosted by Kim Atienza, Pokwang and Rabiya Mateo. It premiered on July 25, 2022 on the network's daytime line up. Atienza, Pokwang, Jayson Gainza, Faith da Silva and Herlene Budol currently serve as the hosts.

The show is streaming online on Facebook and YouTube.

== Premise ==
The show's goal is to attract audiences with finite games, performances and interactive activities. The studio audience and television viewers are invited to join the show, and later win prizes.

== Hosts ==
Hosts

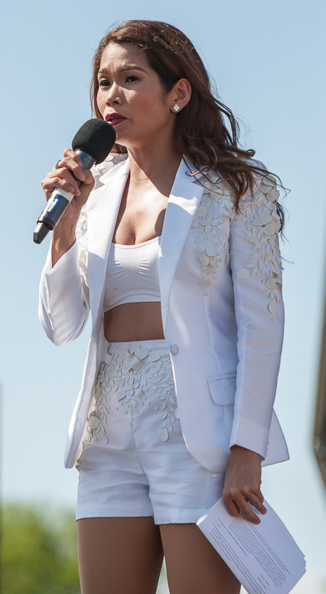
Pokwang

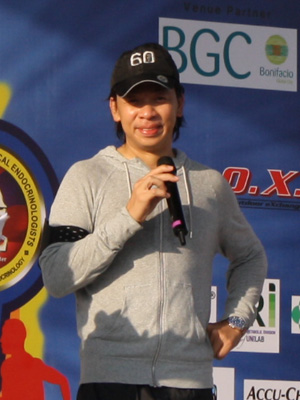
Kim Atienza

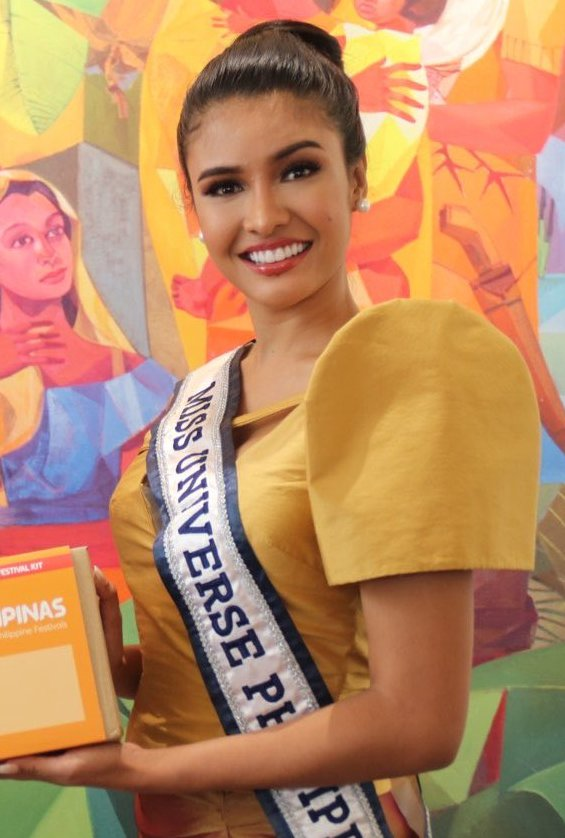
Rabiya Mateo

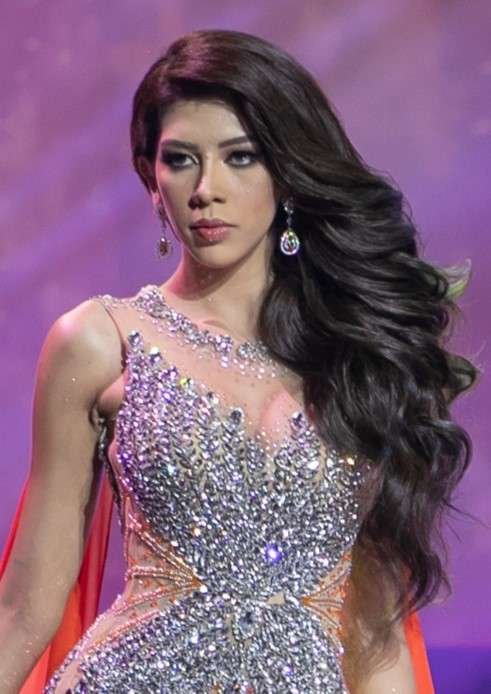
Herlene Budol

- Kim Atienza
- Pokwang
- Jayson Gainza (since 2022)
- Faith da Silva (since 2023)
- Herlene Budol (since 2024)

Former host

- Rabiya Mateo (2022–24)

Guest hosts

- Rhian Ramos (2022–23)
- Boobay (2022)
- Tuesday Vargas (2022)
- Betong Sumaya (2022)
- Eugene Domingo (2023)
- Billy Crawford (2023)
- Donita Nose (2023–24)
- Niño Muhlach (2023)
- Wacky Kiray (2023–24)

== Segments ==
- Hale-Hale Hoy! (since 2022)
- 'Sang Tanong, 'Sang Sabog (since 2022)
- Ulo ng mga Balita (since 2023)
- Puno ng Swerte (2023)
- Tanghalan ng Kampeon (since 2024)

Defunct

- Taympers (2022)
- Oras Mo Na! (2022)
- Dance Raffle (2022)
- Quiz and Shout (2022–23)
- Category Game/TiktoKulitan (2022–23)
- Mamang-huhula (2022)
- Abs 'O Absent (2022)
- Boy Romantiko (2022–23)
- Karoling Galing (2022)
- Zumvivor: Last Mom Standing (2022–23)
- Sing-Patible (2023)
- Sure-Prize! (2023)
- Bibong Tiktropa (2023)
- Sagot Kita, Pilipinas! (2023)
- Beat My Birit! (2023-24)
- Singspector (2023-24)
- Heto na Nga! (2023)
- 12 Boys of Christmas (2023)

== Ratings ==
According to AGB Nielsen Philippines' Nationwide Urban Television Audience Measurement People Ratings, the pilot episode of TiktoClock earned a 4.2% rating.

== Accolades ==
Accolades received by TiktoClock
| Year | Award | Category | Recipient | Result | Ref. |
|---|---|---|---|---|---|
| 2023 | 45th Catholic Mass Media Awards | Best Entertainment Program | TiktoClock | Won | |
| 2025 | 38th PMPC Star Awards for Television | Best Female TV Host | Pokwang | Nominated | |
| 2025 | 38th PMPC Star Awards for Television | Best Variety Show | TiktoClock | Nominated | |
| 2025 | 37th PMPC Star Awards for Television | Best Female TV Host | Pokwang | Pending | |
| 2025 | 37th PMPC Star Awards for Television | Best Variety Show | TiktoClock | Pending | |
