= Studio 7 (TV program) =

Philippine television variety show

- Title card
- Genre: Variety show
- Developed by: Darling De Jesus-Bodegon
- Written by: Rommel S. Gacho; Trish Mangubat Lunosco; Haydee Belen; Buboy Caress
- Directed by: Miguel Tanchanco
- Presented by: Christian Bautista; Julie Anne San Jose; Mark Bautista
- Country of origin: Philippines
- Original language: Tagalog
- No. of episodes: 59

Production
- Executive producer: Paul Lester M. Chia
- Production locations: Studio 7, GMA Network Studios Annex, Quezon City, Philippines
- Editors: Edward Alegre; Noel Mauricio
- Camera setup: Multiple-camera setup
- Running time: 60–75 minutes
- Production company: GMA Entertainment Group

Original release
- Network: GMA Network
- Release: October 13, 2018 – December 7, 2019

Studio 7 is a Philippine television variety show broadcast by GMA Network. Directed by Miguel Tanchanco, it is hosted by Christian Bautista, Julie Anne San Jose and Mark Bautista. It premiered on October 13, 2018, on the network's Sabado Star Power sa Gabi line up. The show concluded on December 7, 2019, with a total of 59 episodes.

== Cast ==
Hosts

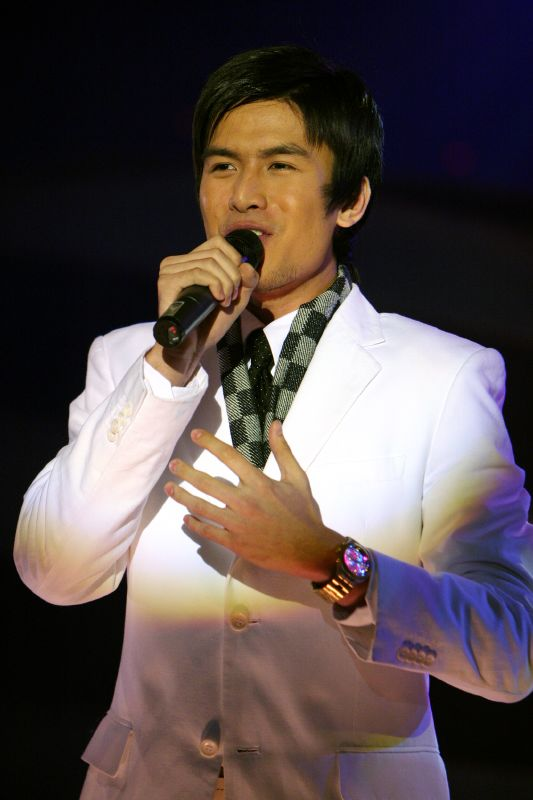
Christian Bautista

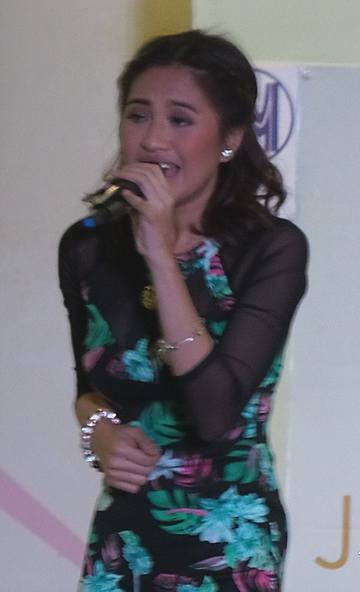
Julie Anne San Jose

Hosts

- Christian Bautista (2018–19)
- Mark Bautista (2018–19)
- Julie Anne San Jose (2018–19)

Co-hosts / performers

- Migo Adecer (2018–19)
- Josh Adornado (2018–19)
- Kyline Alcantara (2018–19)
- Garrett Bolden (2018–19)
- Golden Cañedo (2018–19)
- Angel Guardian (2019)
- Ken Chan (2019)
- Paolo Contis (2019)
- Rayver Cruz (2018–19)
- Rodjun Cruz (2018–19)
- Rita Daniela (2019)
- Gabbi Garcia (2018–19)
- Maricris Garcia (2018–19)
- JBK (2018–19)
- Cassy Legaspi (2018–19)
- Mavy Legaspi (2018–19)
- Jong Madaliday (2018–19)
- Mirriam Manalo (2018–19)
- Donita Nose (2018–19)
- Mikee Quintos (2018–19)
- Anthony Rosaldo (2018–19)
- Paul Salas (2018–19)
- Aicelle Santos (2018–19)
- Kate Valdez (2018–19)
- Joaquin Domagoso (2019)

== Ratings ==
According to AGB Nielsen Philippines' Nationwide Urban Television Audience Measurement People in Television Homes, the pilot episode of Studio 7 earned a 12.2% rating. Based from Nationwide Urban Television People audience shares, the series had its highest rating on October 14, 2018, with a 12.3 rating.

== Accolades ==
Accolades received by Studio 7
Year	Award	Category	Recipient	Result	Ref.
2019	Anak TV Seal Awards		Studio 7	Won	
2019	33rd PMPC Star Awards for Television	Best Musical Variety Show	Studio 7	Nominated	
2019	33rd PMPC Star Awards for Television	Best New Female TV Personality	Golden Cañedo	Nominated	
2020	Gandingan 2020: The 14th UPLB Isko’t Iska Multi-media Awards	Special Citation for Most Development Oriented Musical Segment/Program	Studio 7	Won	
