= Golden Cañedo =

Filipina singer (born 2002)

- Born: Roma Mae Cañedo Apa-ap; April 5, 2002 (age 24); Minglanilla, Cebu, Philippines
- Education: University of the Visayas Minglanilla Campus
- Occupations: Singer, actress
- Years active: 2017–present
- Agent: Sparkle GMA Artist Center

Roma Mae Cañedo Apa-ap (born April 5, 2002), professionally known as Golden Cañedo (Tagalog pronunciation: [kaˈɲɛdɔ]), is a Filipina singer. She was the first winner of reality TV competition The Clash. She began pursuing nursing studies in 2021.

== Life and career ==
In October 2017, Cañedo appeared as a contestant in It's Showtime's Tawag ng Tanghalan, where she performed "Pusong Ligaw" and was eliminated. In 2018, she competed in another reality singing show, The Clash, winning the competition. Later that year she became a contract artist with GMA Network. Along with other The Clash contestants, she appeared on the late-night musical variety show Studio 7. In 2019, Cañedo joined All-Out Sundays.

In 2021, Cañedo moved back to her native Cebu to begin undergraduate nursing studies at the University of Visayas.

== Discography ==
=== Singles ===
Year	Title	Notes	Label	Ref.
2018	"Ngayon"		GMA Music	
2019	"Tayo Pa Rin"		GMA Music	
2019	"More Than Before"	To Have & to Hold theme song	GMA Music	
2019	"Magpakailanman"	Magpakailanman theme song	GMA Music	
2019	"Nakikita Ba ng Langit?"	Kara Mia theme song	GMA Music	
2019	"Huwag Kang Susuko"	Prima Donnas theme song	GMA Music	
2020	"Tayong Dalawa"	Anak ni Waray vs. Anak ni Biday theme song	GMA Music	
2020	"Walang Hanggang Sandali"		GMA Music	

== Filmography ==
Television
Year	Title	Role	Notes	Ref.
2017	It's Showtime	Herself	Contender, Tawag ng Tanghalan segment	
2018	The Clash	Herself	Contender / Grand Champion	
2018; 2019; 2020; 2026	Unang Hirit	Herself	Guest	
2018–19	Studio 7	Herself	Performer / Co-host	
2018	Magpakailanman: Top of The Clash - The Golden Cañedo Story	Herself	Episode role / Guest	
2018; 2019	Sarap, 'Di Ba?	Herself	Guest	
2018; 2019	Sunday PinaSaya	Herself	Guest Performer	
2018	Puso ng Pasko: The GMA Christmas Special	Herself	Performer	
2018–19	Countdown to 2019: The GMA New Year Special	Herself	Performer	
2019	The Clash	Herself	Guest Performer	
2019–20	Kapuso Countdown to 2020: The GMA New Year Special	Herself	Performer	
2020–21	All-Out Sundays	Herself	Performer / Co-host	
2020	Wowowin	Herself	Guest	
2020	The Clash	Herself	Guest Performer	
2020	The Clash Christmas Special: Pasko Para sa Lahat	Herself	Performer	
2020–21	Kapuso Countdown to 2021: The GMA New Year Special	Herself	Performer	
2021	Centerstage	Herself	Guest	
2021	The Clash: Flashback Specials	Herself		
2023	The Clash	Herself	Guest Performer	
2026	Born to Shine	Lexie Epolito	Part of girl group NIXI /Lead Antagonist	

Awards and achievements
Preceded by New	The Clash; 2018 (season 1)	Succeeded by Jeremiah Tiangco
