= TBATS On the Go =

Philippine television and web talk show

- Title card since 2026
- Also known as: The Boobay and Tekla Show; TBATS: Tawa Is Life
- Genre: Comedy; Late-night talk show
- Directed by: Rico Gutierrez; Frasco Mortiz
- Presented by: Boobay; Super Tekla
- Country of origin: Philippines
- Original language: Tagalog

Production
- Camera setup: Multiple-camera setup
- Running time: 34–37 minutes
- Production company: GMA Entertainment Group

Original release
- Network: YouTube (2018); GMA Network (2019)
- Release: March 1, 2018 – present

TBATS On the Go (also known as The Boobay and Tekla Show and TBATS: Tawa Is Life) is a Philippine television comedy talk show broadcast by YouTube and GMA Network. The show premiered as a streaming television show on YouTube on March 1, 2018. Directed by Rico Gutierrez and Frasco Mortiz, it is hosted by Boobay and Super Tekla. It premiered on terrestrial television on January 27, 2019 on the network's Sunday Grande sa Gabi line up.

The show is streaming online on YouTube.

== Hosts ==
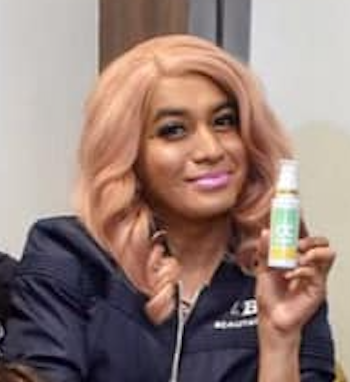
Boobay serves as the host.

- Boobay
- Super Tekla

Recurring cast

- Pepita Curtis (since 2020)
- Ian Red (since 2021)
- Jennie Gabriel (since 2021)
- Buboy Villar (since 2021)
- John Vic De Guzman (since 2022)
- Jessica Villarubin (since 2022)

== Production ==
In March 2020, the admission of a live audience in the studio and production were suspended due to the enhanced community quarantine in Luzon caused by the COVID-19 pandemic. The show resumed its programming on September 13, 2020.

== Ratings ==
According to AGB Nielsen Philippines' Nationwide Urban Television Audience Measurement People in Television Homes, the pilot episode of The Boobay and Tekla Show earned a 5.7% rating.

== Accolades ==
Accolades received by The Boobay and Tekla Show
Year	Award	Category	Recipient	Result	Ref.
2019	33rd PMPC Star Awards for Television	Best Variety Show	The Boobay and Tekla Show	Nominated	
2021	Best Choice Awards	Most Outstanding Stand Up Comedian	Boobay	Won	
2021	Best Choice Awards	Most Outstanding Stand Up Comedian	Super Tekla	Won	
2021	Best Choice Awards	Most Outstanding Variety Show	The Boobay and Tekla Show	Won	
2021	34th PMPC Star Awards for Television	Best Variety Show	The Boobay and Tekla Show	Nominated	
2023	35th PMPC Star Awards for Television	Best Variety Show	The Boobay and Tekla Show	Nominated	
2025	38th PMPC Star Awards for Television	Best Variety Show	The Boobay and Tekla Show	Nominated	
