= Centerstage =

2020 Philippine television reality show

- Title card
- Genre: Reality competition
- Directed by: Louie Ignacio
- Presented by: Alden Richards; Betong Sumaya
- Judges: Aicelle Santos; Mel Villena; Pops Fernandez
- Country of origin: Philippines
- Original language: Tagalog
- No. of episodes: 21

Production
- Camera setup: Multiple-camera setup
- Production company: GMA Entertainment Group

Original release
- Network: GMA Network
- Release: February 16, 2020 – June 6, 2021

Centerstage is a Philippine television reality talent competition show broadcast by GMA Network. Directed by Louie Ignacio, it is hosted by Alden Richards and Betong Sumaya. It premiered on February 16, 2020 on the network's Sunday Grande sa Gabi line up. The show concluded on June 6, 2021, with a total of 21 episodes.

== Hosts ==
Hosts

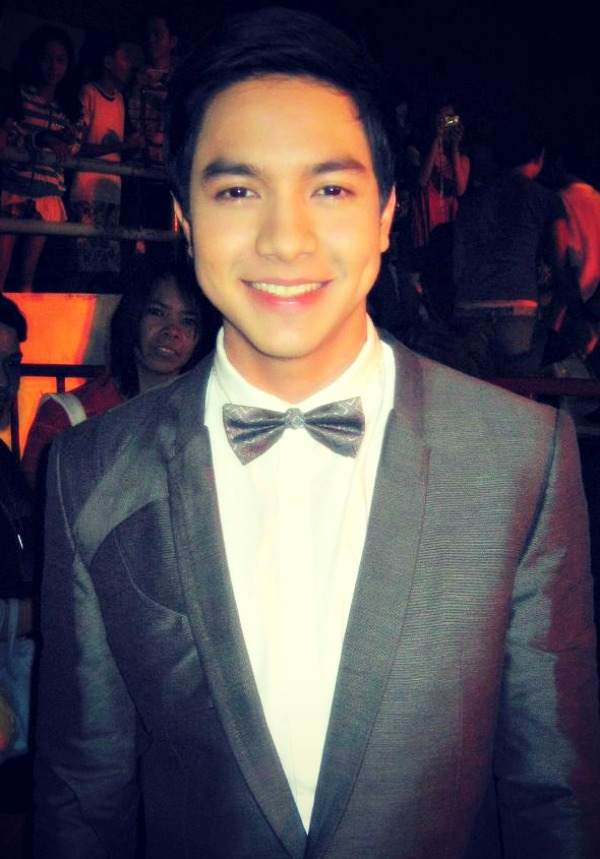
Alden Richards

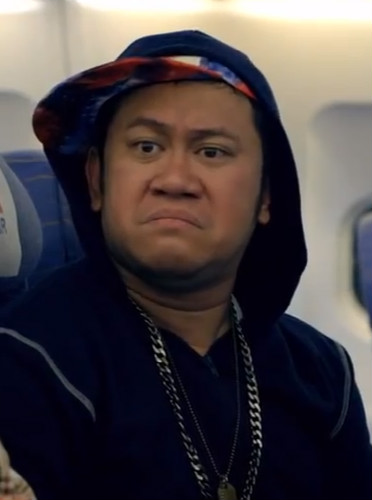
Betong Sumaya

- Alden Richards
- Betong Sumaya

== Judges ==
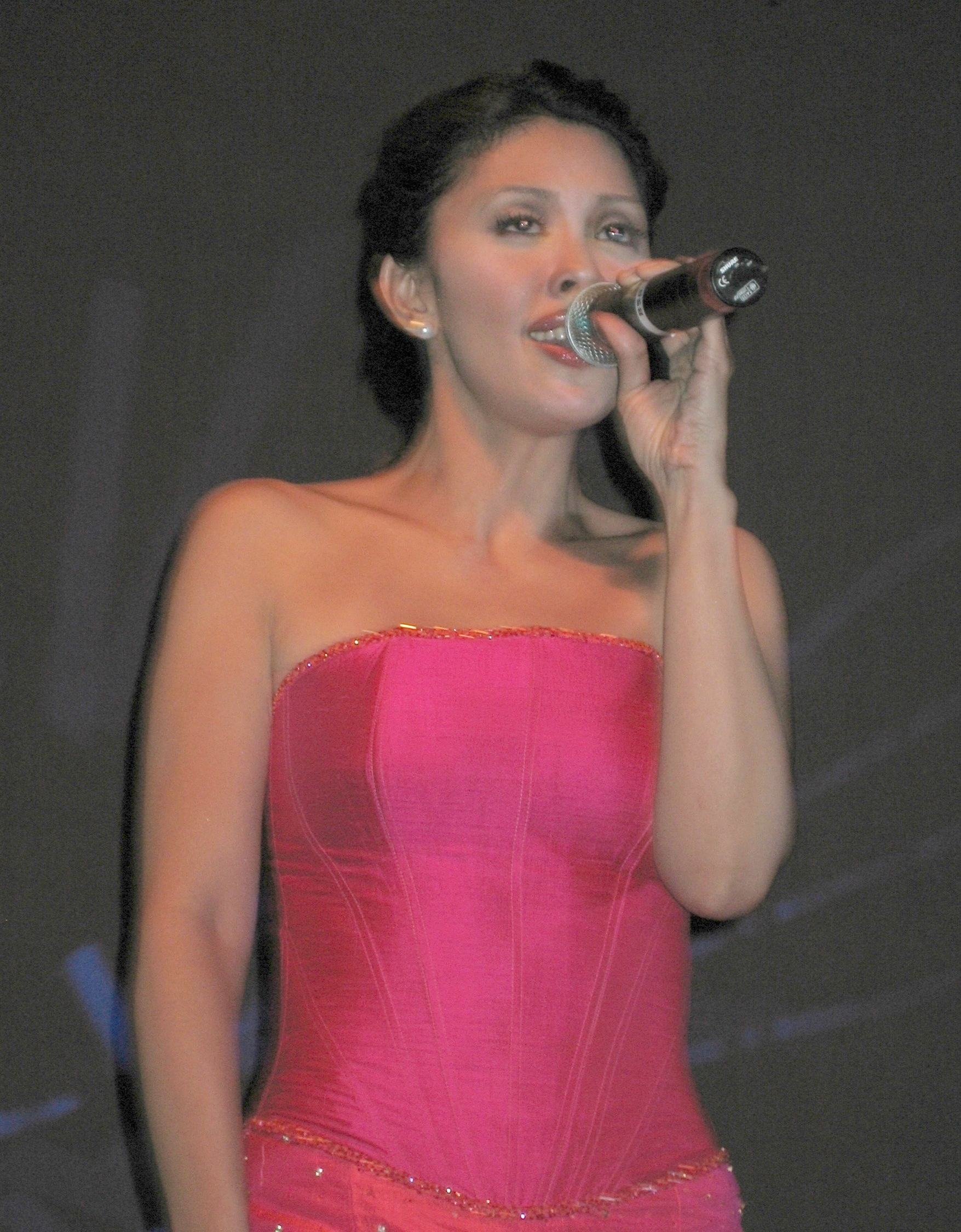
Pops Fernandez serves as a judge.

- Aicelle Santos
- Mel Villena
- Pops Fernandez

== Production ==
In March 2020, the admission of a live audience in the studio and production were suspended due to the enhanced community quarantine in Luzon caused by the COVID-19 pandemic. The show resumed its programming on February 28, 2021.

== Ratings ==
According to AGB Nielsen Philippines' Nationwide Urban Television Audience Measurement People in Television Homes, the pilot episode of Centerstage earned a 9.5% rating.
