= Catch Me Out Philippines =

2021 Philippine television reality show

- Title card
- Genre: Reality competition
- Based on: Catch Me Out
- Directed by: Rico Gutierrez
- Presented by: Jose Manalo
- Judges: Derrick Monasterio; Kakai Bautista
- Country of origin: Philippines
- Original language: Tagalog

Production
- Camera setup: Multiple-camera setup
- Running time: 45 minutes
- Production company: GMA Entertainment Group

Original release
- Network: GMA Network
- Release: February 6 – September 4, 2021

Catch Me Out Philippines is a 2021 Philippine television reality talent competition show broadcast by GMA Network. The show is based on the British version of the same name. Hosted by Jose Manalo, it premiered on February 6, 2021 on the network's Sabado Star Power sa Gabi line up. The show concluded on September 4, 2021.

== Premise ==
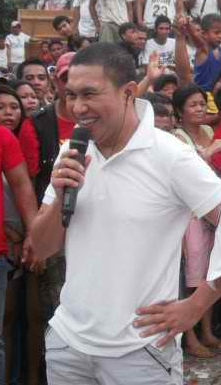
Jose Manalo served as the host.

Every week, two amateur performers will undergo training for a month under their mentors to master a certain skill. After which, each of them will perform alongside professional performers in front of ten celebrity catchers, including the show's regular celebrity spotters, Derrick Monasterio and Kakai Bautista.

At the end of episode, the impostor who managed to trick the most members of the show's celebrity catchers will be hailed as the winner and will be tagged as the episode's Great Pretender.

== Cast ==
Host

- Jose Manalo

Judges

- Derrick Monasterio
- Kakai Bautista
