= Family Feud (Philippine game show) =

Philippine television game show

- Title card since 2022
- Genre: Game show
- Based on: Family Feud (1976) by Mark Goodson
- Directed by: Ding Bolanos; Uro Q. dela Cruz; Arnel Natividad; Treb Monteras II
- Presented by: Ogie Alcasid; Richard Gomez; Dingdong Dantes; Edu Manzano; Luis Manzano
- Narrated by: Jefferson Utanes; Michael Knight; Al Torres; Peter Musñgi; Papa Dudut
- Theme music composer: Rick Turk; Sherwin Castillo; Ash Alexander & Simon Darlow; Simon Tan
- Opening theme: "Ano'ng Sabe" (instrumental)
- Ending theme: "Ano'ng Sabe" by Jeremiah Tiangco
- Country of origin: Philippines
- Original language: Tagalog

Production
- Executive producers: Nelson Lopez Alindogan; Agnes T. Suriaga
- Camera setup: Multiple-camera setup
- Running time: 50 minutes
- Production companies: ABC Entertainment Department; ABS-CBN Studios; Fremantle Asia; GMA Entertainment Group; Pearson Television International

Original release
- Network: ABC (November 19, 2001 – December 28, 2002); GMA Network (October 13, 2008 – July 1, 2011; since March 21, 2022); ABS-CBN (April 9, 2016 – May 7, 2017)
- Release: November 19, 2001 – present

Family Feud is a Philippine television game show based on the American series of the same name, in which two families or teams compete to name the most popular answers to survey questions in order to win cash and prizes.

Family Feud's Philippine series first aired from 2001 to 2002 on ABC and was presented by Ogie Alcasid. The second series aired on GMA Network from 2008 to 2011 and was presented by Richard Gomez (2008–09), Dingdong Dantes (2009–10) and Edu Manzano (2011). A third series aired on ABS-CBN from 2016 to 2017 and was presented by Luis Manzano. The game show returned on GMA in 2022, with Dingdong Dantes returning as the presenter.

The show is streaming online on YouTube.

== Overview ==
Family Feud has aired on multiple networks in four iterations since 2001. Originally hosted by Ogie Alcasid, it premiered on November 19, 2001 on ABC, and ended after 172 episodes on December 28, 2002.

The show moved to GMA Network on October 13, 2008 and was hosted by Richard Gomez in 2008 to 2009, Dingdong Dantes in 2009 to 2010, and Edu Manzano in 2011, until it ended after 324 episodes on July 1, 2011.

On ABS-CBN, Luis Manzano served as the host and the show started airing on April 9, 2016, and ended after 109 episodes on May 7, 2017.

The show returned on GMA Network on March 21, 2022 with Dantes returning as host. On September 16, 2026, Dantes announced that he would temporarily take a break from hosting due to filming for The Master Cutter. Michael V. served as the guest host.

== Hosts ==
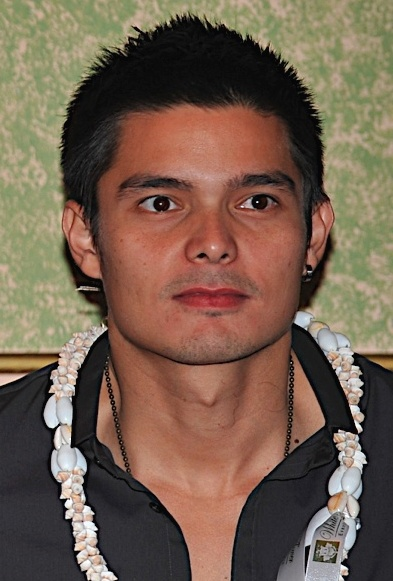
Dingdong Dantes serves as the host.

- Ogie Alcasid (2001–02)
- Richard Gomez (2008–09)
- Dingdong Dantes (2009–10; since 2022)
- Edu Manzano (2011)
- Luis Manzano (2016–17)

== Accolades ==
Accolades received by Family Feud
Year	Award	Category	Recipient	Result	Ref.
2009	23rd PMPC Star Awards for Television	Best Game Show Host	Richard Gomez	Won	
2010	24th PMPC Star Awards for Television	Best Game Show Host	Richard Gomez	Nominated	
2023	Platinum Stallion National Media Awards	Best Game Show	Dingdong Dantes	Won	
2024	6th Gawad Lasallianeta	Most Outstanding Entertainment Show	Family Feud	Won	
2024	52nd Box Office Entertainment Awards	Most Popular TV Program	Family Feud	Won	
2024	Asian Academy Creative Awards	Best Entertainment Host	Dingdong Dantes	Won	
2025	38th PMPC Star Awards for Television	Best Game Show Host	Dingdong Dantes	Won	
2025	37th PMPC Star Awards for Television	Best Game Show Host	Dingdong Dantes	Won	
2026	48th Catholic Mass Media Awards	Best Entertainment Program	Family Feud	Won	
