= NCAA Season 96 =

- Host school: Colegio de San Juan de Letran
- Tagline: "Rise Up Stronger"

Seniors' champions
Sport		Men	Women
Basketball		Not held	N/A
Chess		Lyceum	NT

Juniors' champions
Sport		Boys	Girls
Chess		Letran	N/A
- (NT) = No tournament; (DS) = Demonstration Sport; (Ex) = Exhibition;

NCAA Season 96 was the 2020–21 athletic year of the National Collegiate Athletic Association (NCAA) in the Philippines. The season host was the Colegio de San Juan de Letran, coincidentally also celebrating its 400th anniversary.

== Background ==
Due to the COVID-19 pandemic in Metro Manila, the preceding season, NCAA Season 95, was terminated. This meant tournaments that were ongoing or have not been started were all canceled. No championships were decided on canceled tournaments, and no general champions were named. The Management Committee has recommended on starting the athletic year in November, instead of the usual July schedule, with President Rodrigo Duterte moving the start of the academic year to September.

This is also the first season where foreigners are banned from playing.

After UAAP Season 83 was cancelled, the NCAA insisted on going through with its season.

On May 14, 2021, it was reported that Martin Javier and Sophia Senoron was to host the season. The opening ceremony was held virtually on June 13, 2021. Originally set for May, it was postponed to June 13 following the surge of COVID-19 cases in the country as well as the placement of the NCR+ under enhanced community quarantine.

No championships involving contact sports, including the basketball and volleyball, would be held. Holding games under the bubble format was considered for basketball and volleyball but such plans did not push through.

== Basketball ==
The season also had basketball tournaments but it was a skills showdown featuring Martin Antonio teaching the skills. It featured San Beda's Radge Tongco, San Sebastian's Ian Valdez, EAC's Jethro Mendoza, Benilde's Kendrix Belgica, LPU's Kim Cinco, Arellano's Leonard Anquillo, Perpetual's Gerald Dizon, Letran's Mark Cruz and JRU's Justin Padua to show their skills. Its skills were shooting stars and dribble and shoot.

Rank	Name	Team	SS Time	D&S Time	Total Time
1st place, gold medalist(s)	Kim Cinco (C/SFW)	Lyceum Pirates	27.35	24.19	51.54
2nd place, silver medalist(s)	Leonard Anquillo (SFL)	Arellano Chiefs	31.64	22.58	54.22
3rd place, bronze medalist(s)	Mark Cruz (FL/SFW)	Letran Knights (H)	37.75	20.31	58.06
4	Radge Tongco (SFL)	San Beda Red Lions	58.42	30.72	1:29.14
5	Kendrix Belgica	Benilde Blazers	1:01.23	37.39	1:38.62
6	Ian Valdez	San Sebastian Stags	1:13.96	30.61	1:44.57
7	Gerald Dizon	Perpetual Altas	1:36.79	53.36	2:30.15
8	Justin Padua	JRU Heavy Bombers	2:57.58	37.52	3:35.10
9	Jethro Mendoza	EAC Generals	3:29.51	20.06	3:49.60

Legend:

(C) = Champion

(SFL) = Semifinals Loser

(SFW) = Semifinals Winner

(FL) = Finals Loser

(H) = Host

== Chess ==
=== Seniors' tournament ===
==== Results ====
Rank	Name	Team
1st place, gold medalist(s)	Neymark Digno	Lyceum Pirates
2nd place, silver medalist(s)	Carl Jaedrianne Ancheta	Arellano Chiefs
3rd place, bronze medalist(s)	Carl Zirex Sato	Perpetual Altas
4	Adrian Othniel Yulo	Benilde Blazers

==== Bracket ====
Quarterfinals
July 24
Carl Jaedrianne Ancheta
Avel Louise Baldovia
July 23
Adrian Othniel Yulo
John Michael Magpily
July 22
Carl Zirex Sato
Nel Richmond Miranda
July 25
Neymark Digno
John Paulo Medina

Semifinals
July 26
Carl Jaedrianne Ancheta
Adrian Othniel Yulo
July 27
Neymark Digno
Carl Zirex Sato

Final
July 29
Neymark Digno
Carl Jaedrianne Ancheta
3rd place
July 28
Carl Zirex Sato
Adrian Othniel Yulo

== Taekwondo ==
=== Men's tournament ===
Poomsae – Standard
Rank	Name	Team	Score
1st place, gold medalist(s)	Alfritz Arevalo	San Beda Red Lions	7.217
2nd place, silver medalist(s)	Ivan Murray Solimen	Benilde Blazers	7.134
3rd place, bronze medalist(s)	Roi Vinson Belano	Letran Knights	7.083
4	Christian Dave Tayrus	Arellano Chiefs	6.617
5	John Harold Estoy	San Sebastian Stags	6.417
6	Mikko Jeremi Bataoil	JRU Heavy Bombers	6.284
7	Jake Aldrin Ramos	Lyceum Pirates	6.150
8	Ralph Laurenz Gasco	EAC Generals	6.033

Poomsae – Freestyle
Rank	Name	Team	Score
1st place, gold medalist(s)	Michael Christian Macario	San Beda Red Lions	7.033
2nd place, silver medalist(s)	Mikko Jerami Bataoil	JRU Heavy Bombers	5.600
3rd place, bronze medalist(s)	Justin Carl Dominic Nacua	Benilde Blazers	7.033

=== Women's tournament ===
Poomsae – Standard
Rank	Name	Team	Score
1st place, gold medalist(s)	Emie Fernandez	JRU Lady Bombers	7.550
2nd place, silver medalist(s)	Diane Nicole Supangan	Benilde Lady Blazers	7.284
3rd place, bronze medalist(s)	Lara Alejandrea Andres	San Beda Red Lionesses	6.867
4	Keith Laura Baladaya	San Sebastian Lady Stags	6.767
5	Stephanie Shane Ashley Arana	Letran Lady Knights	6.734
6	Chelsea Marie Bañez	EAC Lady Generals	6.484
7	Francis Claire Apuya	Arellano Lady Chiefs	6.234
8	Marinella de Peralta	Lyceum Lady Pirates	6.117

Poomsae – Freestyle
Rank	Name	Team	Score
1st place, gold medalist(s)	Krizelle Therese Yadao	Benilde Lady Blazers	6.900
2nd place, silver medalist(s)	Shyenler Emelo Cedo	JRU Lady Bombers	6.167

=== Juniors' tournament ===
Poomsae – Standard
Rank	Name	Team	Score
1st place, gold medalist(s)	John Vergel Reyes	EAC–ICA Brigadiers	7.217
2nd place, silver medalist(s)	Aaron Isaac Sevilla	San Sebastian Staglets	6.717
3rd place, bronze medalist(s)	Tor Timothy Castillo	San Beda Red Cubs	6.634
4	Lebron James Alemania	Letran Squires	6.117
5	Kimichi Ramirez	La Salle Green Hills Greenies	6.067

Poomsae – Freestyle
Rank	Name	Team	Score
1st place, gold medalist(s)	John McLeary Ornido	EAC–ICA Brigadiers	6.800
2nd place, silver medalist(s)	Raphael Ongkiko	La Salle Green Hills Greenies	6.700

Speed kicking – Bantamweight
Rank	Name	Team	Score
1st place, gold medalist(s)	Ignatius Vicente Pinera	San Beda Red Cubs	6.750
2nd place, silver medalist(s)	Dirk Ranque	Lyceum Junior Pirates	6.483
3rd place, bronze medalist(s)	Lebron James Alemania	Letran Squires	6.200
4	Ken Jireh Cuyugan	EAC–ICA Brigadiers	5.858
5	Earl Arvin Arellano	San Sebastian Staglets	4.467

Speed kicking – Flyweight
Rank	Name	Team	Score
1st place, gold medalist(s)	John Patrick Moneda	Lyceum Junior Pirates	6.733
2nd place, silver medalist(s)	Reymundo Calamba III	San Beda Red Cubs	6.558
3rd place, bronze medalist(s)	Chris Daniel Barrozo	EAC–ICA Brigadiers	6.375
4	Kris Martin Pulanco	Lyceum Junior Pirates	6.367
5	Tristan Andrew Diaz	San Beda Red Cubs	5.108

== Media ==
Due to the dissolution of ABS-CBN Sports and the denial of the new franchise of ABS-CBN by the House of Representatives, the NCAA had to find a new broadcast partner since its media partner's denial of franchise. On November 19, 2020, NCAA signed a deal with GMA Network, making them the broadcast partner for the next six seasons until Season 101.

== See also ==
- UAAP Season 83
