= The Clash (TV program) =

Philippine television reality show

- Season 7 title card
- Genre: Reality competition
- Directed by: Louie Ignacio
- Presented by: Regine Velasquez; Andre Paras; Joyce Pring; Rayver Cruz; Julie Anne San Jose; Ken Chan; Rita Daniela
- Judges: Lani Misalucha; Christian Bautista; Ai-Ai delas Alas; Pops Fernandez
- Theme music composer: Quest
- Opening theme: "Mangarap Ka, Laban Pa" by Quest
- Country of origin: Philippines
- Original language: Tagalog
- No. of seasons: 7
- No. of episodes: 134 + 3 specials

Production
- Executive producer: Maria Luisa Cadag
- Camera setup: Multiple-camera setup
- Running time: 60 minutes
- Production company: GMA Entertainment Group

Original release
- Network: GMA Network
- Release: July 7, 2018 – present

The Clash is a Philippine television reality talent competition show broadcast by GMA Network. Directed by Louie Ignacio, it was originally hosted by Regine Velasquez, Andre Paras and Joyce Pring. It premiered on July 7, 2018, on the network's Sabado Star Power sa Gabi and on Sunday Grande sa Gabi line-up. Rayver Cruz and Julie Anne San Jose currently serve as the hosts.

== Premise ==
The Clash begins with 62 competitors known as "Clashers" which are paired in two, and the winner to take a seat in the 32-seat semi-finalists who qualify for the second round. A wild card contender from a pair of two is electronically selected from among previous losers in the first elimination round. The semi-finalists battle it out among themselves in pairs in the second round. The final winner receives an exclusive management contract from GMA Network Inc., a brand new car, 1 million Philippine pesos and a house and lot.

== Hosts ==
Hosts

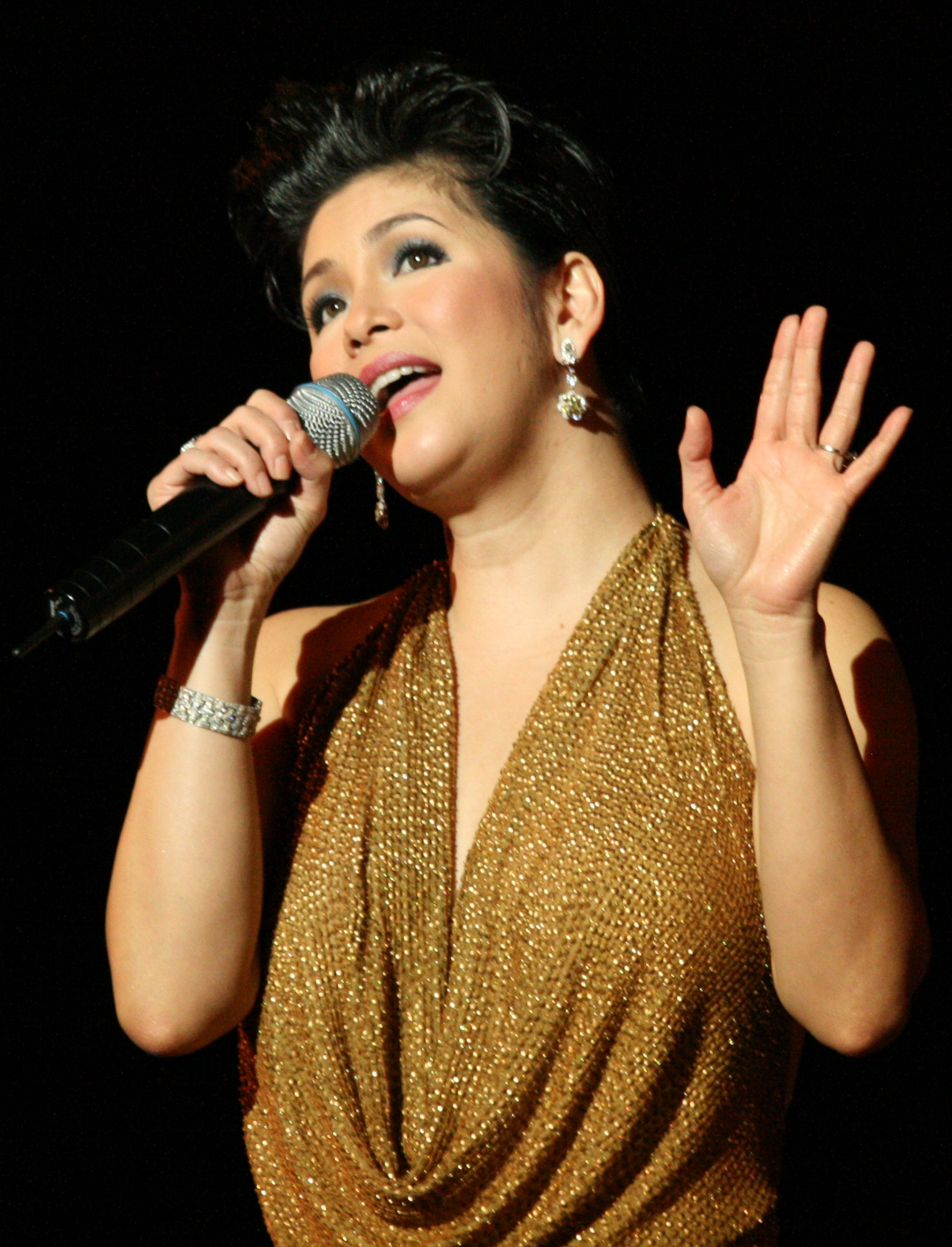
Regine Velasquez

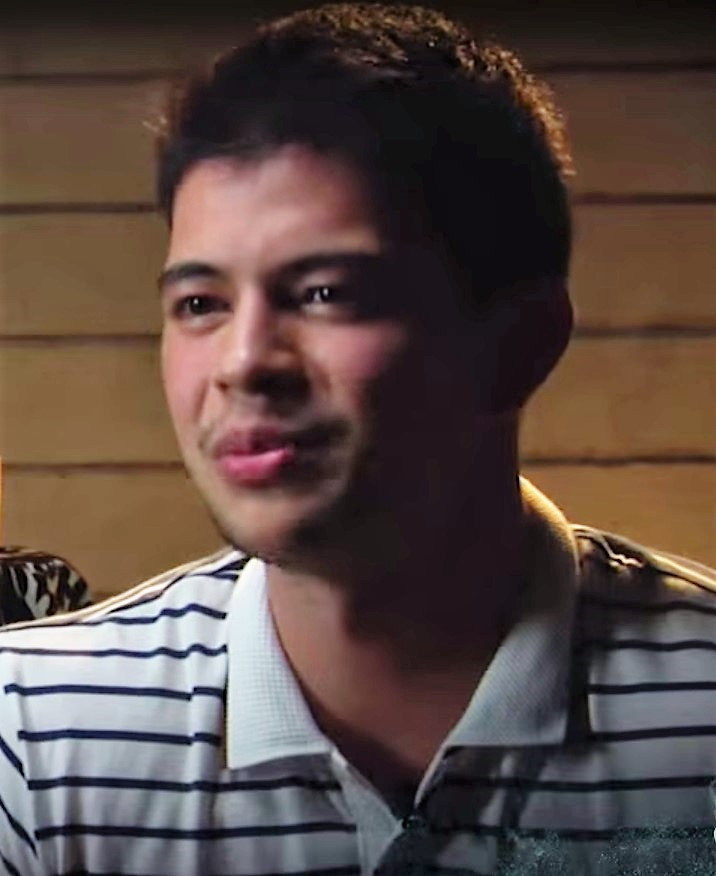
Rayver Cruz

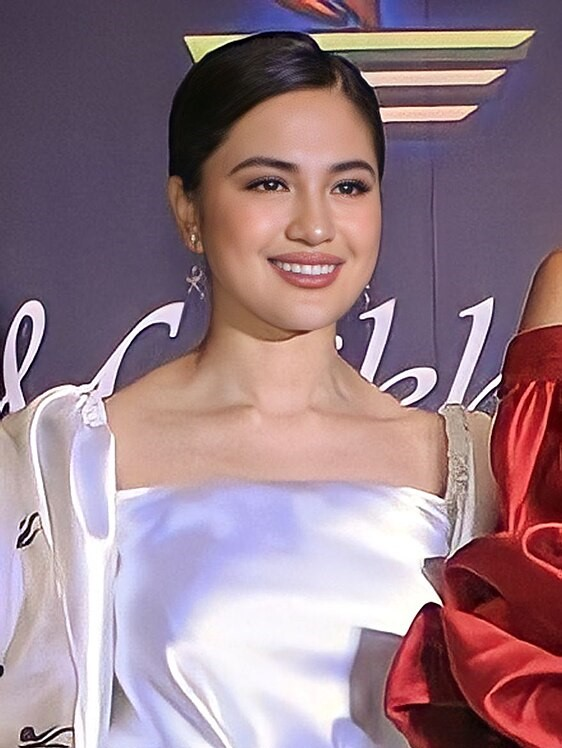
Julie Anne San Jose

Clash masters

- Regine Velasquez (2018)
- Rayver Cruz (since 2019)
- Julie Anne San Jose (since 2019)

Clashmates / Journey hosts

- Andre Paras (2018)
- Joyce Pring (2018)
- Ken Chan (2019–21)
- Rita Daniela (2019–21)

== Judges ==
Judges

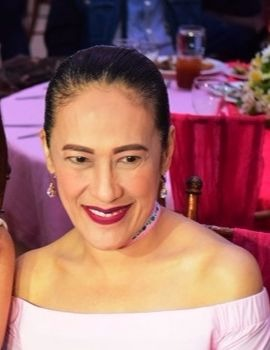
Ai-Ai delas Alas

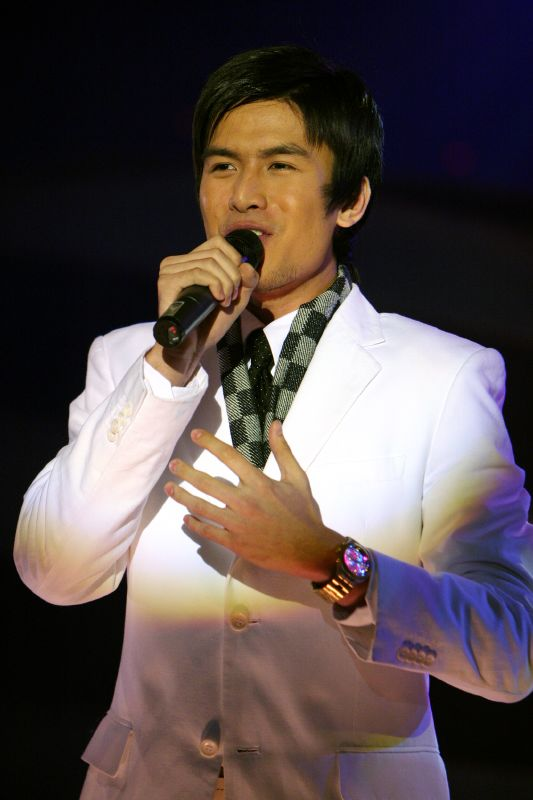
Christian Bautista

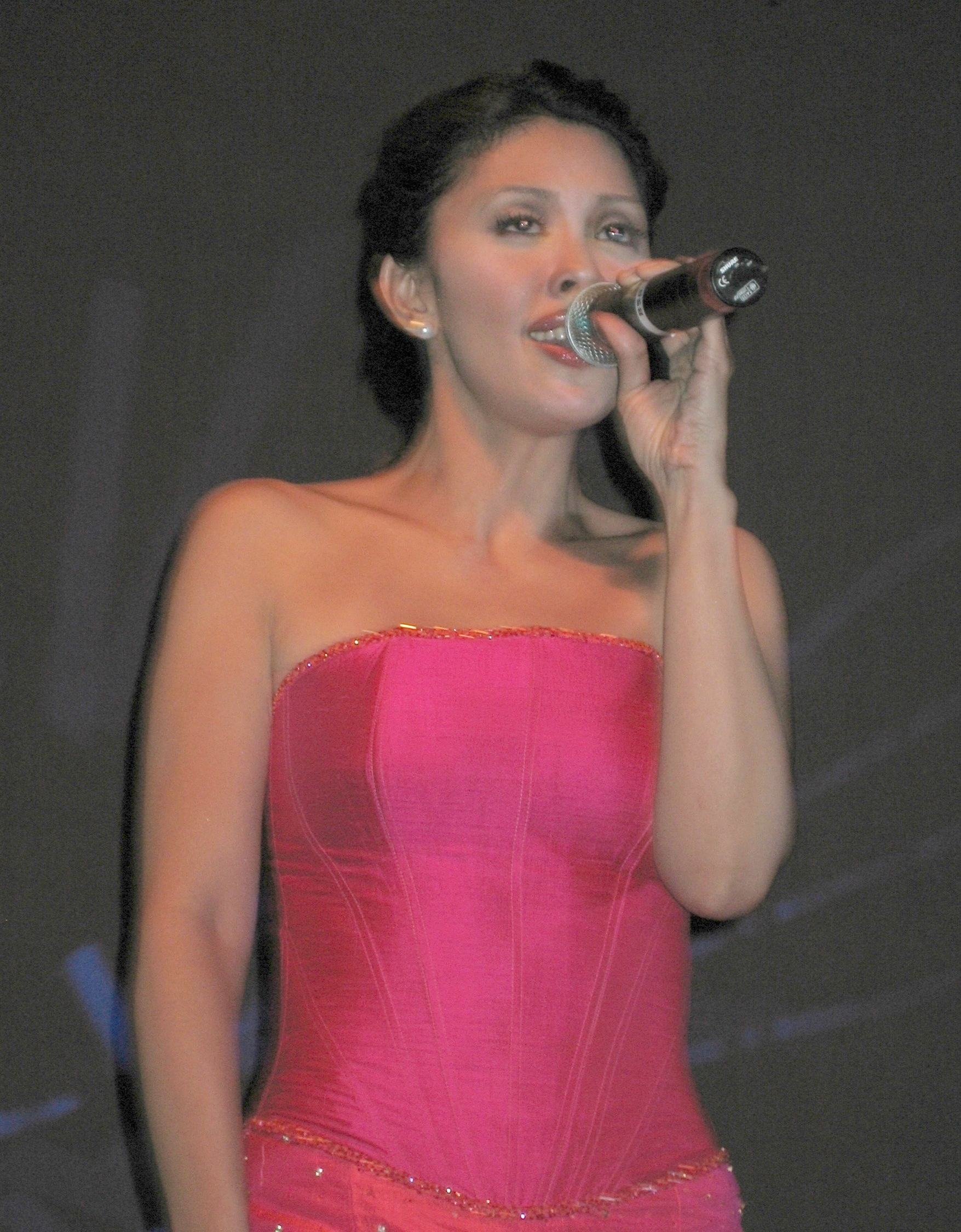
Pops Fernandez

- Lani Misalucha
- Christian Bautista
- Ai-Ai delas Alas
- Pops Fernandez (2020)

== Seasons ==
The Clash seasons
| Season | First released | Last released | Winner | Runner-up | Finalists |
|---|---|---|---|---|---|
| 1 | July 7, 2018 | September 30, 2018 | Golden Cañedo | Jong Madaliday | Garrett Bolden Mirriam Manalo Josh Adornado |
| 2 | September 21, 2019 | December 15, 2019 | Jeremiah Tiangco | Thea Astley | Nef Medina Jennifer Marravilla Antonette Tismo |
| 3 | October 3, 2020 | December 20, 2020 | Jessica Villarubin | Jennie Gabriel | Renz Robosa Sheemee Buenaobra Fritzie Magpoc |
| 4 | October 2, 2021 | December 19, 2021 | Mariane Osabel | Vilmark Viray | Lovely Restituto Julia Serad Mauie Francisco |
| 5 | January 22, 2023 | May 28, 2023 | Rex Baculfo | Arabelle dela Cruz | Mariel Reyes Liana Castillo |
| 6 | September 14, 2024 | December 14, 2024 | Naya Ambi | Chloe Redondo | Angel D. Alfred Bogabil |
| 7 | June 8, 2025 | September 7, 2025 | Jong Madaliday | Arabelle Dela Cruz | Liafer Deloso Juary Sabith |

== Ratings ==
According to AGB Nielsen Philippines' Nationwide Urban Television Audience Measurement People in Television Homes, the season five premiere of The Clash earned a 12.4% rating. The season six premiere scored a 10.6% rating. The season six finale achieved an 11.9% rating. The season seven finale gathered a 12.6% rating.

== Accolades ==
Accolades received by The Clash
| Year | Award | Category | Recipient | Result | Ref. |
|---|---|---|---|---|---|
| 2019 | 33rd PMPC Star Awards for Television | Best Talent Search Program | The Clash | Won | |
| 2019 | 33rd PMPC Star Awards for Television | Best Talent Search Program Host | Regine Velasquez | Nominated | |
| 2021 | 34th PMPC Star Awards for Television | Best Talent Search Program | The Clash | Won | |
| 2021 | 34th PMPC Star Awards for Television | Best Talent Search Program Host | Julie Anne San Jose Rayver Cruz | Nominated | |
| 2023 | 35th PMPC Star Awards for Television | Best Talent Search Program | The Clash | Won | |
| 2023 | 35th PMPC Star Awards for Television | Best Talent Search Program Host | Julie Anne San Jose Rayver Cruz | Won | |
| 2025 | 36th PMPC Star Awards for Television | Best Talent Search Program Host | Rayver Cruz Julie Anne San Jose | Pending | |

== Spin-off ==
A spin-off The Clash Teens, consisting of teenagers was announced in January 2026. The show premiered on June 7, 2026.
