= NCAA Season 98 =

2022–23 season of Philippine college athletics

- Host school: Emilio Aguinaldo College
- Tagline: "Achieve Greatness Every Day"

Seniors' champions
Sport		Men	Women
Basketball		Letran	NT
Volleyball		Perpetual	Benilde
Beach volleyball		Perpetual	Letran
Swimming		San Beda	San Beda
Track and field		JRU	NT
- Cheerdance: Arellano (Ex - Coed)

Juniors' champions
Sport		Boys	Girls
Basketball		Letran	NT
Volleyball		Perpetual	EAC–ICA
- (NT) = No tournament; (DS) = Demonstration Sport; (Ex) = Exhibition;

NCAA Season 98 was the 2022–23 athletic year of the National Collegiate Athletic Association (NCAA) in the Philippines. It was hosted by Emilio Aguinaldo College and was opened on September 10, 2022.

== Background ==
At the closing proceedings of NCAA Season 97, the then-Season Policy Board President from De La Salle–College of Saint Benilde turned over the NCAA Flag to the next host. Season 98 opened at the Smart Araneta Coliseum on September 10, with the rest of the elimination round of the seniors' basketball tournament once again returning at Filoil EcoOil Centre.

After two seasons, events such as men's and women's volleyball, track and field, swimming, and beach volleyball events returned at the senior's division. For juniors, the competition was composed of online taekwondo, online chess, and boys' basketball.

== Basketball ==
The seniors' basketball tournament began on September 10, 2022. The juniors' tournament, the first since 2019, started on February 1, 2023.

=== Seniors' tournament ===
==== Elimination round ====
Pos	Team	W	L	PCT	GB	Qualification
1	Benilde Blazers	14	4	.778	—	Twice-to-beat in the semifinals
2	Letran Knights	13	5	.722	1	Twice-to-beat in the semifinals
3	Lyceum Pirates	12	6	.667 (Note: Head-to-head record: Lyceum 2–0 San Beda)	2	Twice-to-win in the semifinals
4	San Beda Red Lions	12	6	.667	2	Twice-to-win in the semifinals
5	San Sebastian Stags	8	10	.444	6	
6	Arellano Chiefs	7	11	.389 (Note: Head-to-head record: Arellano 4–2, Mapua 3–3, Perpetual 3–3 (Mapua 1–1 Perpetual, Mapua +6), JRU 2–4)	7	
7	Mapúa Cardinals (Note: NCAA Management Committee reversed Mapúa's win over San Beda in their first round game, ruling it as a 20–0 forfeit win for San Beda after Mapúa fielded an ineligible player in Gab Gamboa. He was found to have been enrolled in another school outside the NCAA.)	7	11	.389	7	
8	Perpetual Altas	7	11	.389	7	
9	JRU Heavy Bombers	7	11	.389	7	
10	EAC Generals (H)	3	15	.167	11	

Source: GMA
Rules for classification: 1) winning percentage; 2) head-to-head record; 3) overall point differential
(H) Hosts

==== Playoffs ====
Semifinals (Top 2 twice-to-beat)
1	Benilde	62
4	San Beda	61
2	Letran	67
3	Lyceum	58

Finals (Best-of-three series)
1	Benilde	75	76	67
2	Letran	81	71	81

==== Awards ====
- Most Valuable Player: Will Gozum (Benilde Blazers)
- Rookie of the Year: Cade Flores (Arellano Chiefs)

=== Juniors' tournament ===
==== Elimination round ====
Pos	Team	W	L	PCT	GB	Qualification
1	Letran Squires	8	1	.889	—	Twice-to-beat in the semifinals
2	San Beda Red Cubs	6	3	.667 (Note: Head-to-head differential: LSGH +23, Malayan +16, San Beda −5, San Sebastian −34; playoff #1: San Beda 93–80 San Sebastian; playoff #2: San Beda 86–75 Malayan (Malayan #4); playoff #3: San Beda 83–77 LSGH (San Beda #2; LSGH #3))	2	Twice-to-beat in the semifinals
3	La Salle Green Hills Greenies	6	3	.667	2	Twice-to-win in the semifinals
4	Mapúa Red Robins	6	3	.667	2	Twice-to-win in the semifinals
5	San Sebastian Staglets	6	3	.667	2	
6	Perpetual Junior Altas	4	5	.444	4	
7	Arellano Braves	3	6	.333 (Note: Head-to-head differential: Arellano +14, Lyceum −5, JRU −9)	5	
8	Lyceum Junior Pirates	3	6	.333	5	
9	JRU Light Bombers	3	6	.333	5	
10	EAC–ICA Brigadiers (H)	0	9	.000	8	

Source: NCAA on Livestats
Rules for classification: 1) Winning percentage; 2) if tied for #2 or #4, one-game playoff; 3) if two teams are tied, head-to-head record, if three or more teams are tied, head-to-head point differential
(H) Hosts

==== Playoffs ====
Semifinals (Top 2 twice-to-beat)
1	Letran	83
4	Malayan	78
2	San Beda–Rizal	79	85
3	LSGH	92	89

Finals (Best-of-three series)
1	Letran	85	77
3	LSGH	81	61

==== Awards ====
- Most Valuable Player: Luis Pablo (La Salle Green Hills Greenies)
- Rookie of the Year: Matthew Rubico (Lyceum Junior Pirates)

== Volleyball ==
The NCAA seniors' volleyball tournaments started on February 18, and ended on April 16, 2023. The San Andres Sports Complex in Manila hosted the elimination round, while the Filoil EcoOil Centre in San Juan hosted the playoffs.

=== Men's tournament ===
==== Elimination round ====
Pos	Team	Pld	W	L	Pts	SW	SL	SR	SPW	SPL	SPR	Qualification
1	Perpetual Altas	9	9	0	26	27	4	6.750	301	222	1.356	Advance to the Finals (Note: As Perpetual won all of their elimination round games, the stepladder format will be used instead of the regular Final Four format.)
2	Arellano Chiefs	9	8	1	22	24	11	2.182	447	417	1.072	Proceed to stepladder round 2
3	San Beda Red Spikers	9	6	3	20	23	12	1.917	407	394	1.033	Proceed to stepladder round 1
4	EAC Generals	9	6	3	18	22	14	1.571	420	414	1.014	Proceed to stepladder round 1
5	Mapúa Cardinals	9	5	4	15	21	16	1.313	369	324	1.139	
6	JRU Heavy Bombers	9	4	5	12	17	20	0.850	330	349	0.946	
7	Letran Knights	9	4	5	12	15	19	0.789	368	365	1.008	
8	Benilde Blazers	9	2	7	7	11	21	0.524	344	363	0.948	
9	San Sebastian Stags (H)	9	1	8	3	8	24	0.333	277	300	0.923	
10	Lyceum Pirates	9	0	9	0	0	27	0.000	371	375	0.989	

Rules for classification: 1) Number of wins; 2) match points; 3) sets ratio; 4) points ratio; 5) head-to-head record
(H) Host
Notes:

Point system:

3 points = win match in 3 or 4 sets
2 points = win match in 5 sets
1 point = lose match in 5 sets
0 point = lose match in 3 or 4 sets

==== Playoffs ====
First round (Single elimination)
3	San Beda	3
4	EAC	1

Second round (Single elimination)
2	Arellano	1
3	San Beda	3

Finals (Best-of-three playoff)
1	Perpetual	3	2	3
3	San Beda	0	3	1

==== Awards ====
- Most Valuable Player: Louie Ramirez (Perpetual Altas)
- Rookie of the Year: Vince Himzon (Letran Knights)

=== Women's tournament ===
==== Elimination round ====
Pos	Team	Pld	W	L	Pts	SW	SL	SR	SPW	SPL	SPR	Qualification
1	Benilde Lady Blazers	9	9	0	25	27	5	5.400	609	474	1.285	Advance to the Finals (Note: As Benilde won all of their elimination round games, the stepladder format will be used instead of the regular Final Four format.)
2	Perpetual Lady Altas	9	8	1	24	24	9	2.667	330	300	1.100	Proceed to stepladder round 2
3	Lyceum Lady Pirates	9	6	3	19	22	11	2.000	418	413	1.012	Proceed to stepladder round 1
4	Mapúa Lady Cardinals	9	6	3	19	24	17	1.412	411	407	1.010	Proceed to stepladder round 1
5	Letran Lady Knights	9	5	4	17	21	18	1.167	527	517	1.019	
6	Arellano Lady Chiefs	9	5	4	16	20	14	1.429	606	525	1.154	
7	San Sebastian Lady Stags	9	3	6	10	15	18	0.833	231	282	0.819	
8	JRU Lady Bombers	9	1	8	5	11	24	0.458	584	632	0.924	
9	San Beda Lady Red Spikers	9	1	8	4	11	24	0.458	274	360	0.761	
10	EAC Lady Generals (H)	9	1	8	2	8	26	0.308	438	523	0.837	

Rules for classification: 1) Number of wins; 2) match points; 3) sets ratio; 4) points ratio; 5) head-to-head record
(H) Host
Notes:

Point system:

3 points = win match in 3 or 4 sets
2 points = win match in 5 sets
1 point = lose match in 5 sets
0 point = lose match in 3 or 4 sets

==== Playoffs ====
First round (Single elimination)
3	Lyceum	3
4	Mapúa	1

Second round (Single elimination)
2	Perpetual	1
3	Lyceum	3

Finals (Best-of-three playoff)
1	Benilde	3	3
3	Lyceum	0	0

==== Awards ====
- Most valuable player: Mary Rhose Dapol (Perpetual Lady Altas)
- Rookie of the Year: Shaila Allaine Omipon (Perpetual Lady Altas)

== Beach volleyball ==
The NCAA Beach Volleyball tournaments were held in the Subic Bay Sand Courts in Olongapo.

=== Men's tournament ===
==== Elimination round ====
Pos	Team	W	L	Pts	Qualification
1	Perpetual Altas	9	0	18	Twice-to-beat in the semifinals
2	EAC Generals	8	1	17	Twice-to-beat in the semifinals
3	Arellano Chiefs	7	2	16	Twice-to-win in the semifinals
4	San Beda Red Spikers	5	4	14	Twice-to-win in the semifinals
5	Benilde Blazers	4	5	13	
6	San Sebastian Stags	4	5	13	
7	Letran Knights	3	6	12	
8	Mapúa Cardinals	3	6	12	
9	JRU Heavy Bombers	2	7	11	
10	Lyceum Pirates	0	9	9	

==== Bracket ====
Semifinals (Nos. 1 & 2 have twice-to-beat advantage)
1	Perpetual	2
4	San Beda	0
2	EAC	2
3	Arellano	0

Finals (Single elimination)
1	Perpetual	2
2	EAC	1

=== Semifinals ===
Both Perpetual and EAC have the twice-to-beat advantage while they only have to win once, while their opponents twice, to advance to the Finals.

==== Perpetual vs. San Beda ====
21 January 2022	Perpetual Altas	2–0	San Beda Red Spikers	Subic Bay San Courts, Olongapo
21 January 2022	(21–18, 21–11)			Subic Bay San Courts, Olongapo

Perpetual wins series in one game

==== EAC vs. Arellano ====
21 January 2022	EAC Generals	2–1	Arellano Chiefs	Subic Bay San Courts, Olongapo
21 January 2022	(21–15, 18–21, 18–16)			Subic Bay San Courts, Olongapo

EAC wins series in one game

=== Finals ===
This is a single elimination game.

21 January 2022	Perpetual Altas	2–1	EAC Generals	Subic Bay San Courts, Olongapo
21 January 2022	(21–10, 15–21, 15–13)			Subic Bay San Courts, Olongapo

==== Awards ====
- Most Valuable Player: Jefferson Marapoc (Perpetual Altas)

=== Women's tournament ===
==== Elimination round ====
Pos	Team	W	L	Pts	Qualification
1	Perpetual Lady Altas	9	0	18	Twice-to-beat in the semifinals
2	Letran Lady Knights	8	1	17	Twice-to-beat in the semifinals
3	EAC Lady Generals	7	2	16	Twice-to-win in the semifinals
4	San Beda Lady Red Spikers	6	3	15	Twice-to-win in the semifinals
5	Benilde Lady Blazers	5	4	14	
6	San Sebastian Lady Stags	3	6	12	
7	Arellano Lady Chiefs	3	6	12	
8	Lyceum Lady Pirates	2	7	11	
9	Mapúa Lady Cardinals	1	8	10	
10	JRU Lady Bombers	1	8	10	

==== Bracket ====
Semifinals (Nos. 1 & 2 have twice-to-beat advantage)
1	Perpetual	2
4	San Beda	0
2	Letran	2
3	EAC	0

Finals (Single elimination)
1	Perpetual	0
2	Letran	2

=== Semifinals ===
Both Perpetual and EAC have the twice-to-beat advantage while they only have to win once, while their opponents twice, to advance to the Finals.

==== Perpetual vs. San Beda ====
21 January 2022	Perpetual Lady Altas	2–0	San Beda Lady Red Spikers	Subic Bay San Courts, Olongapo
21 January 2022	(21–17, 21–10)			Subic Bay San Courts, Olongapo

Perpetual wins series in one game

==== EAC vs. CSJL ====
21 January 2022	Letran Lady Knights	2–0	EAC Lady Generals	Subic Bay San Courts, Olongapo
21 January 2022	(21–8, 21–6)			Subic Bay San Courts, Olongapo

Letran wins series in one game

=== Finals ===
This is a single elimination game.

21 January 2022	Perpetual Lady Altas	0–2	Letran Lady Knights	Subic Bay San Courts, Olongapo
21 January 2022	(17–21, 12–21)			Subic Bay San Courts, Olongapo

==== Awards ====
- Most Valuable Player: Cha Cuñada (Letran Knights)

== Swimming ==
The San Beda Red Lions and Red Lionesses won their respective swimming championships held at the Teofilo Yldefonso Swimming Pool, Rizal Memorial Sports Complex, Manila. The Benilde Blazers and Letran Knights finished second and third, respectively, in the men's tournament, while the Benilde Lady Blazers and EAC Lady Generals finished second and third, respectively, in the women's tournament.

Rank	Men's team	Score	Rank	Women's	Score
1st place, gold medalist(s)	San Beda Red Lions	1,496	1st place, gold medalist(s)	San Beda Red Lions	1,573.5
2nd place, silver medalist(s)	Benilde Blazers	501	2nd place, silver medalist(s)	Benilde Blazers	571
3rd place, bronze medalist(s)	Letran Knights	290	3rd place, bronze medalist(s)	EAC Generals	325.5

== Track and field ==
The JRU Heavy Bombers won the track and field championship held from April 19 to 20, 2023, at the PhilSports Complex in Pasig. The Mapua Cardinals and Perpetual Altas finished second and third, respectively.

Rank	Men's team	Score
1st place, gold medalist(s)	JRU Heavy Bombers	685
2nd place, silver medalist(s)	Mapúa Cardinals	661.5
3rd place, bronze medalist(s)	Perpetual Altas	389

== Cheerleading Competition ==
The NCAA Cheerleading Competition Season 98 was held on April 30, 2023 at the Rizal Memorial Coliseum.

=== Team standings ===
Rank	Team	Judge 1	Judge 2	Judge 3	Judge 4	Judge 5	Score	Deducation	Total
1st place, gold medalist(s)	AU Chiefsquad	84	81	81.5	81.5	82.5	410.5	0	245.5
2nd place, silver medalist(s)	Altas Perpsquad	81	75	75	76	76.5	383.5	0	227.5
3rd place, bronze medalist(s)	Letran Cheering Squad	71	72.5	68	73	72	356.5	0	215.5
4	Mapúa Cheerping Cardinals	78	71	69	66.5	70.5	355	0	210.5
5	San Beda Red Corps	76	70	71	68	73	358	10	204
6	EAC Generals Pep Squad	67.5	71.5	62.5	64	65	330.5	0	196.5
7	Benilde Blazers Pep Squad	62	61	61.5	61	62	307.5	1	183.5
8	Golden Stags Cheerleading Squad	50.5	53.5	53	50	52	259	0	155.5
8	LPU Pirates Pep Squad	54.5	55	51	52.5	54.5	267.5	6	155.5
10	JRU Pep Squad	46	46.5	44	48.5	47	232	1	138.5

=== Awards ===
NCAA Season 98 cheerleading champions
Arellano Chiefs
Fifth title, fourth consecutive title

== See also ==
- UAAP Season 85
