= Domagoso =

Domagoso is a Filipino surname. Notable people with the surname include:

- Isko Moreno Domagoso (born 1974), Filipino actor and politician
- Joaquin Domagoso (born 2001), Filipino actor, model, and son of Isko
