= Pilar Pilapil =

Filipino actress (born 1950)

Pilar Pilapil-Peñas
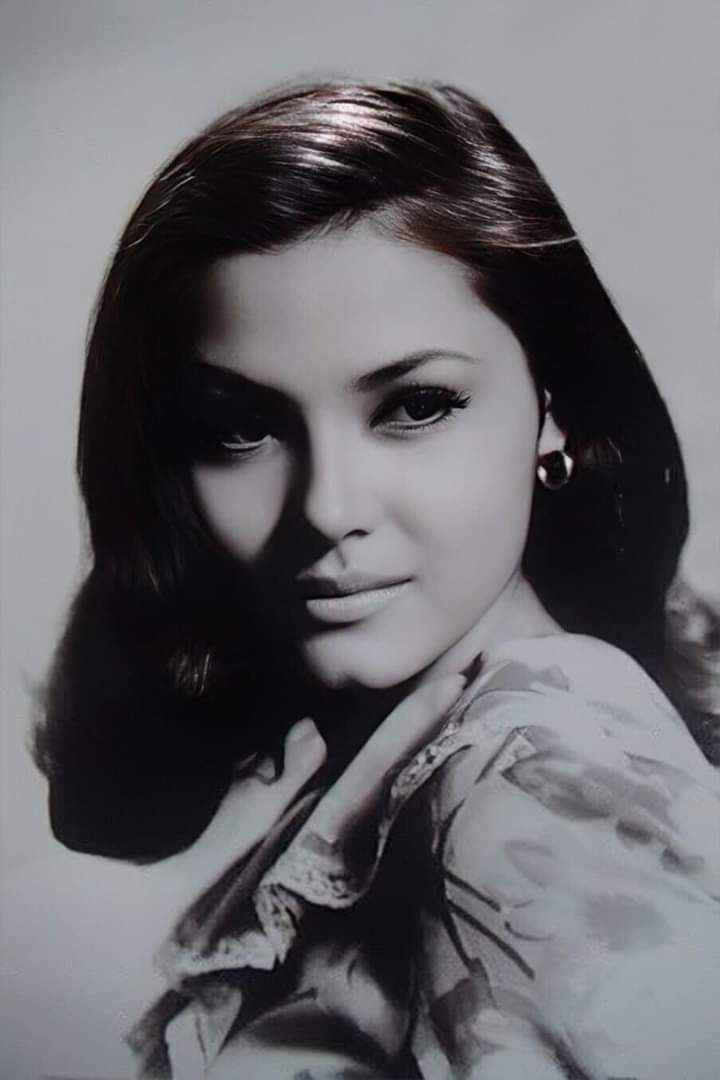
- Pilapil in 1967
- Born: Pilar Delilah Veloso Pilapil; October 12, 1950 (age 76); Liloan, Cebu, Philippines
- Occupations: Actress, producer, author
- Political party: Independent (2004)
- Beauty pageant titleholder
- Title: Binibining Pilipinas Universe 1967
- Years active: 1967–present
- Major competitions: Binibining Pilipinas 1967 (Winner – Binibining Pilipinas Universe 1967); Miss Universe 1967 (Unplaced)

Pilar Delilah Veloso Pilapil-Peñas (born October 12, 1950) is a Filipino actress and beauty pageant titleholder. She was crowned as Binibining Pilipinas Universe 1967. She represented the Philippines at the Miss Universe 1967 pageant but was unplaced.

In the 1970s, 1980s and 1990s her highly publicized life became the staple of the multimedia.

Pilapil starred in Highly Acclaimed Films such as Kailan Ba Tama Ang Mali in 1985, Tinik Sa Dibdib and Nagkapasakit Kuya Eddie an outstanding feat she was nominated and won one award in the movie categories for FAP FAMAS and MMFF then Manila Film Festival in 1985 in 1988.

She did the film Kailan Mahuhugasan Ang Kasalanan she continued to take a break and then came back with more movie projects such as Forever with Aga Muhlach and Mikee Counjangco and Tayo Na Sa Dilim and Bakit Ako Mahihiya in 1997.

She went on to do a soap called Mulha Ng Buhay for Viva Television as a main antagonist of the television series.

== Early life ==
Pilar Delilah Veloso Pilapil was born on October 12, 1950, in Liloan, Cebu, Philippines the youngest of six girls with four brothers after her.

== Career ==
After winning the Binibining Pilipinas beauty pageant in 1967, Pilapil was swamped with offers to join the movies. Her first film was the action picture El Nino in 1968 with Andy Poe as her leading man, directed by Fernando Poe, Jr. She did movies with Dolphy such as Dolpe De Gulat in 1969 and El Pinoy Matador in 1970, among others. Pilapil won two best actress awards, one for the movie Imelda, Ang Uliran in 1970 at the Manila Film Festival and another for the film Napakasakit Kuya Eddie in 1986 for Gawad Urian Award 1987.

In 1996 she did the afternoon drama Mukha Nang Buhay a television soap for Viva Television produced for RPN and simultaneously aired on IBC and its international channel RPN USA as the main antagonist to Lovely Rivero's character and the series. this would become her first Soap Opera on television after later doing work for GMA Network and mostly ABS-CBN primetime dDramas.

She also dabbled in politics when she ran for senator in 2004 as an independent candidate but she lost. Pilapil continues to entertain viewers via ABS-CBN's primetime drama series Ina, Kapatid, Anak premiered on October 8, 2012, and ended in June 2013, and is now airing by Jeepney TV. In 2015 she made her comeback with Pangako Sayo, which she plays Doña Benita Buenavista which originally by Liza Lorena.

In February 2020, she returned to GMA Network after thirteen years of stay with ABS-CBN to appear in Sanya Lopez's drama series, First Yaya and First Lady, respectively.

In 2024, she starred in the medical drama series of GMA Network, Abot-Kamay na Pangarap and portrays the role of Madam Chantal Dubois vda. de Rutaquio, Moira Tanyag's mother.

== Personal life ==
=== Family and relationships ===
Pilapil has a daughter with former Vice President of the Philippines Salvador Laurel named Pia Pilapil, who is also an actress. She married Spanish journalist Michel Ponti on October 12, 1986, at the Manila Cathedral, but they divorced after a year. She became a born-again Christian in 1995, and married Pastor Bernie Penas on May 18, 2002.

=== Philanthropy ===
In 2006, Pilapil released an autobiography The Woman Without A Face, chronicling her life in show business an in private after she went on a short retirement. The sales of the book went to the Pilar Pilapil Foundation, an organization founded by Pilapil which helps battered and abused women.

=== 2011 stabbing incident ===
Pilapil was found in a grassy lot in Antipolo with at least five stab wounds in her body and was rushed to the Medical City Hospital in Pasig City on the night of April 14.

A companion, Rosel Peñas driving her Kia Carens, picked up Pilapil from a mall, supposedly to introduce her to the executives of Unilever Australia, who were then at Riverbend Hotel in Marikina. Peñas was driving when two unidentified men forced their way into the vehicle, stabbed Pilapil, then sped away with Peñas.

Peñas, initially a co-victim, was later tagged as perpetrator and was charged with kidnapping and frustrated murder at the Antipolo prosecutor's office in November 2011.

== Filmography ==
=== Film ===
Year	Title	Role	Notes	Source
1969	Facifica Falayfay	Ligaya		
1975	Kahit ang Mundo'y Magunaw			
1976	Dateline Chicago: Arrest the Nurse Killer			
1978	Pag-ibig... Magkano Ka?			
1984	Bukas, Luluhod ang mga Tala	Doña Monica Estrella		
1985	Tinik sa Dibdib	Tricia		
1992	Bakit Ako Mahihiya?!			
2008	My Best Friend's Girlfriend	Olivia Gonzales		
2008	For the First Time	Sylvia Villaraza		
2013	The Bit Player	Ms. Amanda / Doña Esmeralda		
2013	When the Love is Gone	Cynthia Manuel		
2015	Etiquette for Mistresses	Eliza Castronuevo		
2017	Unexpectedly Yours	Catalina Ignacio		

=== Television ===
Year	Title	Role	Source
1999	Di Ba't Ikaw	Doña Amelia Montecillo	
2001	Sa Dulo ng Walang Hanggan	Adora Evangelista	
2002	Kapalaran		
2004	Hiram	Sophia's mother	
2006	Your Song Presents: Kung Paano	Dana	
2007	MariMar	Doña Dolores Aldama	
2008	Lobo	Eleanor "Lady Elle" Blancaflor	
2008	I Love Betty La Fea	Elvira Valencia	
2008	Kahit Isang Saglit		
2010	Rod Santiago's Agua Bendita	Doña Amalia Montenegro	
2012	Ina, Kapatid, Anak	Yolanda Cruz-Elizalde	
2013	Muling Buksan ang Puso	Elvira Santilices	
2015	Pangako Sa 'Yo	Doña Benita Buenavista	
2015	Pasión de Amor	Doña Maria Eduvina Suarez	
2017	A Love to Last	Victoria Madrigal	
2018	The Blood Sisters	Vida Hechanova	
2019	Nang Ngumiti ang Langit	Madam Divina Salvador	
2021	First Yaya	Blesilda "Blessie" Wenceslao-Acosta	
2022	First Lady	Blesilda "Blessie" Wenceslao-Acosta	
2024	Abot-Kamay na Pangarap	Madam Chantal Dubois vda. de Rutaquio	
2026	The Loyalty Game	Mona Saguil	

== Awards and nominations ==
Year	Work	Organization	Category	Result	Source
1970	Imelda, Ang Uliran	Manila Film Festival	Best Actress	Won	
1973	Isinilang Ang Anak Ng Ibang Babae	FAMAS Award	Best Actress	Nominated	
1974	Lalaki, Kasalanan Mo	FAMAS Award	Best Actress	Nominated	
1975	Isang Gabi... Tatlong Babae!	FAMAS Award	Best Actress	Nominated	
1977	May Langit Ang Bawat Nilikha	FAMAS Award	Best Actress	Nominated	
1987	Napakasakit, Kuya Eddie	Gawad Urian Award	Best Actress	Won	
1990	Kailan Mahuhugasan ang Kasalanan?	Gawad Urian Award	Best Supporting Actress	Nominated	
1992	Darna	FAMAS Awards	Best Supporting Actress	Nominated	
2009	For The First Time	FAMAS Awards	Best Supporting Actress	Nominated	
2016	Etiquette For Mistresses	PMPC Star Awards for Movies	Movie Supporting Actress of the Year	Nominated	
2018	Unexpectedly Yours	PMPC Star Awards for Movies	Movie Supporting Actress of the Year	Nominated	
2021		The EDDYS	Icon Award	Won	
