= Dahil sa Pag-ibig =

Dahil Sa Pag-ibig may refer to:

- Dahil sa Pag-ibig (2012 TV series), a Philippine telenovela aired on ABS-CBN
- Dahil sa Pag-ibig (2019 TV series), a Philippine telenovela aired on GMA Network
