= List of Haplos episodes =

Haplos is a 2017 Philippine television drama series, directed by Gil Tejada Jr. starring Sanya Lopez, Thea Tolentino, Rocco Nacino and Pancho Magno. Which premiered on GMA Network's GMA Afternoon Prime block and worldwide on GMA Pinoy TV on July 10, 2017 to February 23, 2018 on the network's Afternoon Prime line up replacing D' Originals.

NUTAM (Nationwide Urban Television Audience Measurement) People in television homes ratings are provided by AGB Nielsen Philippines. The series ended, but its the 33rd-week run, and with a total of 165 episodes. It was replaced by Hindi Ko Kayang Iwan Ka.

== Series overview ==
| Month | Episodes | Monthly averages |
| Month | Episodes | NUTAM |
|---|---|---|
| July 2017 | 16 | 5.3% |
| August 2017 | 23 | 5.6% |
| September 2017 | 21 | 6.3% |
| October 2017 | 22 | 6.0% |
| November 2017 | 22 | 5.9% |
| December 2017 | 21 | 5.7% |
| January 2018 | 23 | 5.4% |
| February 2018 | 17 | 6.2% |
| Total | 165 | 5.8% |

== Episodes ==
=== July 2017 ===
| Episode | | Original air date | Social media hashtag | AGB Nielsen NUTAM People | | | Ref. |
| Episode | | Original air date | Social media hashtag | Rating | Timeslot rank | Whole day rank | Ref. |
|---|---|---|---|---|---|---|---|
| 1 | "Unang Haplos" | July 10, 2017 | #UnangHaplos | 4.9 % | #1 | #7 | |
| 2 | "Nakaw na Halik" | July 11, 2017 | #HaplosNakawNaHalik | 5.7% | #1 | #5 | |
| 3 | "Anak sa Labas" | July 12, 2017 | #HaplosAnakSaLabas | 4.4% | #2 | #10 | |
| 4 | "Birthday Party" | July 13, 2017 | #HaplosBirthdayParty | 5.1% | #1 | #6 | |
| 5 | "Magkapatid" | July 14, 2017 | #HaplosMagkapatid | 4.4% | #2 | #10 | |
| 6 | "Eskandalo" | July 17, 2017 | #HaplosEskandalo | 5.0% | #1 | #7 | |
| 7 | "Ritwal" | July 18, 2017 | #HaplosRitwal | 4.8% | #1 | #8 | |
| 8 | "Atraksyon" | July 19, 2017 | #HaplosAtraksyon | 4.7% | #1 | #7 | |
| 9 | "Duda" | July 20, 2017 | #HaplosDuda | 5.1% | #2 | #8 | |
| 10 | "Bistado" | July 21, 2017 | #HaplosBistado | 4.8% | #1 | #8 | |
| 11 | "Bagong Kakampi" | July 24, 2017 | #HaplosBagongKakampi | 5.9% | #1 | #4 | |
| 12 | "Bagong Kakampi" | July 25, 2017 | #HaplosBagongKakampi | 4.9% | #1 | #7 | |
| 13 | "Hidden Camera" | July 26, 2017 | #HaplosHiddenCamera | 6.4% | #1 | #6 | |
| 14 | "Ganti" | July 27, 2017 | #HaplosGanti | 7.0% | #1 | #6 | |
| 15 | "Lola Biring" | July 28, 2017 | #HaplosLolaBiring | 7.5% | #1 | #6 | |
| 16 | "Fully Paid" | July 31, 2017 | #HaplosFullyPaid | 4.9% | #2 | #9 | |

=== August 2017 ===
| Episode | | Original air date | Social media hashtag | AGB Nielsen NUTAM People | | | Ref. |
| Episode | | Original air date | Social media hashtag | Rating | Timeslot rank | Whole day rank | Ref. |
|---|---|---|---|---|---|---|---|
| 17 | "Balik Bayad" | August 1, 2017 | #HaplosBalikBayad | 5.1% | #1 | #6 | |
| 18 | "Barang o Kanser" | August 2, 2017 | #HaplosBarangOKanser | 6.0% | #1 | #6 | |
| 19 | "Haplos ni Angela" | August 3, 2017 | #HaplosNiAngela | 5.2% | #1 | #7 | |
| 20 | "Bilin" | August 4, 2017 | #HaplosBilin | 5.3% | #1 | #7 | |
| 21 | "Gayuma" | August 7, 2017 | #HaplosGayuma | 5.1% | #1 | #7 | |
| 22 | "Alembong" | August 8, 2017 | #HaplosAlembong | 5.0% | #1 | #8 | |
| 23 | "Angela vs. Lucille" | August 9, 2017 | #HaplosAngelaVSLucille | 5.5% | #1 | #5 | |
| 24 | "Power of 2" | August 10, 2017 | #HaplosPowerOf2 | 4.9% | #1 | #7 | |
| 25 | "Huling Hakbang" | August 11, 2017 | #HaplosHulingHakbang | 5.0% | #1 | #7 | |
| 26 | "The Boss" | August 14, 2017 | #HaplosTheBoss | 4.9% | #1 | #6 | |
| 27 | "Ipinagpalit" | August 15, 2017 | #HaplosIpinagpalit | 4.9% | #1 | #7 | |
| 28 | "Gerald vs. Benedict" | August 16, 2017 | #HaplosGeraldVSBenedict | 4.6% | #1 | #7 | |
| 29 | "Kitang-kita Na" | August 17, 2017 | #HaplosKitangKitaNa | 5.3% | #1 | #6 | |
| 30 | "Hindi Matanggap" | August 18, 2017 | #HaplosHindiMatanggap | 5.2% | #1 | #8 | |
| 31 | "Muntikan" | August 21, 2017 | #HaplosMuntikan | 6.9% | #1 | #5 | |
| 32 | "Kontra Gayuma" | August 22, 2017 | #HaplosKontraGayuma | 6.7% | #1 | #6 | |
| 33 | "Muling Pagkikita" | August 23, 2017 | #HaplosMulingPagkikita | 6.1% | #1 | #6 | |
| 34 | "Resbak" | August 24, 2017 | #HaplosResbak | 5.6% | #1 | #5 | |
| 35 | "Asunto" | August 25, 2017 | #HaplosAsunto | 7.2% | #1 | #4 | |
| 36 | "Panganib" | August 28, 2017 | #HaplosPanganib | 5.9% | #1 | #6 | |
| 37 | "Yakap" | August 29, 2017 | #HaplosYakap | 6.4% | #1 | #5 | |
| 38 | "Palengke War" | August 30, 2017 | #HaplosPalengkeWar | 6.5% | #1 | #4 | |
| 39 | "Paratang" | August 31, 2017 | #HaplosParatang | 6.3% | #1 | #5 | |

=== September 2017 ===
| Episode | | Original air date | Social media hashtag | AGB Nielsen NUTAM People | | | Ref. |
| Episode | | Original air date | Social media hashtag | Rating | Timeslot rank | Whole day rank | Ref. |
|---|---|---|---|---|---|---|---|
| 40 | "Dinner Date" | September 1, 2017 | #HaplosDinnerDate | 7.5% | #1 | #6 | |
| 41 | "Confirmed" | September 4, 2017 | #HaplosConfirmed | 5.9% | #1 | #6 | |
| 42 | "Trahedya" | September 5, 2017 | #HaplosTrahedya | 6.2% | #1 | #6 | |
| 43 | "Goodbye Fred" | September 6, 2017 | #HaplosGoodbyeFred | 6.2% | #1 | #6 | |
| 44 | "Sagupaan" | September 7, 2017 | #HaplosSagupaan | 5.9% | #1 | #6 | |
| 45 | "Triggered" | September 8, 2017 | #HaplosTriggered | 5.5% | #1 | #11 | |
| 46 | "Beach Getaway" | September 11, 2017 | #HaplosBeachGetaway | 6.5% | #1 | #12 | |
| 47 | "Savior" | September 12, 2017 | #HaplosSavior | 8.1% | #1 | #9 | |
| 48 | "Mahal" | September 13, 2017 | #HaplosMahal | 7.2% | #1 | #11 | |
| 49 | "Mutya" | September 14, 2017 | #HaplosMutya | 6.9% | #1 | #13 | |
| 50 | "Masahe" | September 15, 2017 | #HaplosMasahe | 5.7% | #1 | #11 | |
| 51 | "Alias Anj" | September 18, 2017 | #HaplosAliasAnj | 5.6% | #1 | #13 | |
| 52 | "Lucille Meets Anj" | September 19, 2017 | #HaplosLucilleMeetsAnj | — | | | |
| 53 | "Extra Service" | September 20, 2017 | #HaplosExtraService | — | | | |
| 54 | "Stay" | September 21, 2017 | #HaplosStay | 6.6% | #1 | #13 | |
| 55 | "Finding Mutya" | September 22, 2017 | #HaplosFindingMutya | 5.9% | #1 | #14 | |
| 56 | "Race to Mutya" | September 25, 2017 | #HaplosRaceToMutya | 5.7% | #1 | #14 | |
| 57 | "Sabotahe" | September 26, 2017 | #HaplosSabotahe | 6.4% | #1 | #12 | |
| 58 | "Shortcut" | September 27, 2017 | #HaplosShortcut | 6.1% | #1 | #12 | |
| 59 | "Huling Dahon" | September 28, 2017 | #HaplosHulingDahon | 6.2% | #1 | #14 | |
| 60 | "Magical Kiss" | September 29, 2017 | #HaplosMagicalKiss | 6.1% | #1 | #13 | |

=== October 2017 ===
| Episode | | Original air date | Social media hashtag | AGB Nielsen NUTAM People | | | Ref. |
| Episode | | Original air date | Social media hashtag | Rating | Timeslot rank | Whole day rank | Ref. |
|---|---|---|---|---|---|---|---|
| 61 | "Level Up" | October 2, 2017 | #HaplosLevelUp | 5.5% | #1 | #12 | |
| 62 | "Manika" | October 3, 2017 | #HaplosManika | 6.1% | #1 | #13 | |
| 63 | "The Proposal" | October 4, 2017 | #HaplosTheProposal | 5.0% | #1 | #14 | |
| 64 | "Orasyon" | October 5, 2017 | #HaplosOrasyon | 5.7% | #1 | #13 | |
| 65 | "Nasaan Ka, Angela" | October 6, 2017 | #HaplosNasaanKaAngela | 5.9% | #1 | #10 | |
| 66 | "Casa" | October 9, 2017 | #HaplosCasa | 6.0% | #1 | #14 | |
| 67 | "Sayaw" | October 10, 2017 | #HaplosSayaw | 6.7% | #1 | #10 | |
| 68 | "Cage" | October 11, 2017 | #HaplosCage | 5.9% | #1 | #13 | |
| 69 | "Exotica the Dancer" | October 12, 2017 | #HaplosExoticaTheDancer | 6.1% | #1 | #12 | |
| 70 | "Suspetsa" | October 13, 2017 | #HaplosSuspetsa | 6.7% | #1 | #12 | |
| 71 | "Missed Call" | October 16, 2017 | #HaplosMissedCall | 5.8% | #1 | #12 | |
| 72 | "Muntikang Pagkikita" | October 17, 2017 | #HaplosMuntikangPagkikita | 6.3% | #1 | #10 | |
| 73 | "Poser" | October 18, 2017 | #HaplosPoser | 5.9% | #1 | #13 | |
| 74 | "Bagong Pag-asa" | October 19, 2017 | #HaplosBagongPagasa | 5.9% | #1 | #13 | |
| 75 | "Duda ni Benedict" | October 20, 2017 | #HaplosDudaNiBenedict | 5.9% | #1 | #14 | |
| 76 | "Pananakot" | October 23, 2017 | #HaplosPananakot | 5.8% | #1 | #12 | |
| 77 | "Pagtakas" | October 24, 2017 | #HaplosPagtakas | 5.5% | #1 | #16 | |
| 78 | "Auction" | October 25, 2017 | #HaplosAuction | 6.2% | #1 | #13 | |
| 79 | "Winning Bidder" | October 26, 2017 | #HaplosWinningBidder | 6.4% | #1 | #13 | |
| 80 | "Transformation" | October 27, 2017 | #HaplosTransformation | 6.2% | #1 | #11 | |
| 81 | "Shookt" | October 30, 2017 | #HaplosShookt | 5.5% | #1 | #13 | |
| 82 | "Goodbye Wendy" | October 31, 2017 | #HaplosGoodbyeWendy | 6.4% | #1 | #12 | |

=== November 2017 ===
| Episode | | Original air date | Social media hashtag | AGB Nielsen NUTAM People | | | Ref. |
| Episode | | Original air date | Social media hashtag | Rating | Timeslot rank | Whole day rank | Ref. |
|---|---|---|---|---|---|---|---|
| 83 | "Kaakibat ng Sumpa" | November 1, 2017 | #HaplosKaakibatNgSumpa | 6.1% | #1 | #12 | |
| 84 | "Helpless" | November 2, 2017 | #HaplosHelpless | 6.6% | #1 | #12 | |
| 85 | "Book of Spells" | November 3, 2017 | #HaplosBookOfSpells | 6.2% | #1 | #12 | |
| 86 | "Harapan" | November 6, 2017 | #HaplosHarapan | 5.9% | #1 | #15 | |
| 87 | "Secret Room" | November 7, 2017 | #HaplosSecretRoom | 5.8% | #1 | #13 | |
| 88 | "Pagkuha sa Manika" | November 8, 2017 | #HaplosPagkuhaSaManika | 4.8% | #1 | #13 | |
| 89 | "Palaban" | November 9, 2017 | #HaplosPalaban | 6.1% | #1 | #10 | |
| 90 | "Sasakyan Kita" | November 10, 2017 | #HaplosSasakyanKita | 5.5% | #1 | #13 | |
| 91 | "Balon" | November 13, 2017 | #HaplosBalon | 4.7% | #1 | #17 | |
| 92 | "Mahiwagang Kandila" | November 14, 2017 | #HaplosMahiwagangKandila | 5.9% | #1 | #13 | |
| 93 | "Alipin" | November 15, 2017 | #HaplosAlipin | 5.3% | #1 | #17 | |
| 94 | "Duda ni Gerald" | November 16, 2017 | #HaplosDudaNiGerald | 5.8% | #1 | #10 | |
| 95 | "Ibang Babae" | November 17, 2017 | #HaplosIbangBabae | 5.8% | #1 | #13 | |
| 96 | "Alas Sais" | November 20, 2017 | #HaplosAlasSais | 5.2% | #1 | #13 | |
| 97 | "Kumpisal" | November 21, 2017 | #HaplosKumpisal | 5.2% | #1 | #15 | |
| 98 | "Lipstick" | November 22, 2017 | #HaplosLipstick | 5.3% | #1 | #13 | |
| 99 | "Kahit Saglit Lang" | November 23, 2017 | #HaplosKahitSaglitLang | 4.7% | #1 | #15 | |
| 100 | "Singsing" | November 24, 2017 | #HaplosSingsing | 5.9% | #1 | #12 | |
| 101 | "Kontra Sumpa" | November 27, 2017 | #HaplosKontraSumpa | 5.7% | #1 | | |
| 102 | "Sugod Bahay" | November 28, 2017 | #HaplosSugodBahay | 5.5% | #1 | | |
| 103 | "Benedict's Denial" | November 29, 2017 | #HaplosBenedictsDenial | 5.6% | #1 | | |
| 104 | "Missing" | November 30, 2017 | #HaplosMissing | 5.9% | #1 | | |

=== December 2017 ===
| Episode | | Original air date | Social media hashtag | AGB Nielsen NUTAM People | | | Ref. |
| Episode | | Original air date | Social media hashtag | Rating | Timeslot rank | Whole day rank | Ref. |
|---|---|---|---|---|---|---|---|
| 105 | "Takas" | December 1, 2017 | #HaplosTakas | 5.7% | #1 | #13 | |
| 106 | "Bisa ng Kandila" | December 4, 2017 | #HaplosBisaNgKandila | 5.5% | #1 | #14 | |
| 107 | "Reunion" | December 5, 2017 | #HaplosReunion | 5.4% | #1 | #14 | |
| 108 | "Sacrifice of Love" | December 6, 2017 | #HaplosSacrificeOfLove | 5.5% | #1 | #13 | |
| 109 | "Celebration" | December 7, 2017 | #HaplosCelebration | 6.0% | #1 | #13 | |
| 110 | "Under Spell" | December 8, 2017 | #HaplosUnderSpell | 5.9% | #1 | #14 | |
| 111 | "Jump" | December 11, 2017 | #HaplosJump | 5.1% | #1 | #13 | |
| 112 | "Victim" | December 12, 2017 | #HaplosVictim | 5.7% | #1 | #13 | |
| 113 | "Call" | December 13, 2017 | #HaplosCall | 5.1% | #1 | #12 | |
| 114 | "Lucille's Proposal" | December 14, 2017 | #HaplosLucillesProposal | 5.3% | #1 | 13 | |
| 115 | "Wedding Preps" | December 15, 2017 | #HaplosWeddingPreps | 5.5% | #1 | #12 | |
| 116 | "Ultimate Curse" | December 18, 2017 | #HaplosUltimateCurse | 6.5% | #1 | #10 | |
| 117 | "The Search for the Doll" | December 19, 2017 | #HaplosTheSearchForTheDoll | 6.0% | #1 | #13 | |
| 118 | "Kasal" | December 20, 2017 | #HaplosKasal | 6.0% | #1 | #13 | |
| 119 | "Gerald's Wife" | December 21, 2017 | #HaplosGeraldsWife | 6.3% | #1 | #12 | |
| 120 | "Sungay at Buntot na Sumpa" | December 22, 2017 | #HaplosSungayAtBuntotNaSumpa | 6.3% | #1 | #13 | |
| 121 | "Monster Benedict" | December 25, 2017 | #HaplosMonsterBenedict | 4.3% | #1 | #13 | |
| 122 | "Viral" | December 26, 2017 | #HaplosViral | 5.3% | #1 | #13 | |
| 123 | "Taming Benedict" | December 27, 2017 | #HaplosTamingBenedict | 5.9% | #1 | #14 | |
| 124 | "Beast for Sale" | December 28, 2017 | #HaplosBeastForSale | 6.6% | #1 | #11 | |
| 125 | "Curse or Baby" | December 29, 2017 | #HaplosCurseOrBaby | 6.2% | #1 | #11 | |

=== January 2018 ===
| Episode | | Original air date | Social media hashtag | AGB Nielsen NUTAM People | | | Ref. |
| Episode | | Original air date | Social media hashtag | Rating | Timeslot rank | Whole day rank | Ref. |
|---|---|---|---|---|---|---|---|
| 126 | "The Rescue" | January 1, 2018 | #HaplosTheRescue | 5.2% | #1 | #13 | |
| 127 | "Escape Plan" | January 2, 2018 | #HaplosEscapePlan | 5.7% | #1 | #14 | |
| 128 | "Showdown of Powers" | January 3, 2018 | #HaplosShowdownOfPowers | 5.8% | #1 | #15 | |
| 129 | "Lucille's Defeat" | January 4, 2018 | #HaplosLucillesDefeat | 6.6% | #1 | #14 | |
| 130 | "Lola Lucille" | January 5, 2018 | #HaplosLolaLucille | 5.9% | #1 | #14 | |
| 131 | "Search is Over" | January 8, 2018 | #HaplosSearchIsOver | 6.1% | #1 | #13 | |
| 132 | "Blood" | January 9, 2018 | #HaplosBlood | 5.0% | #1 | #14 | |
| 133 | "Agawan ng Libro" | January 10, 2018 | #HaplosAgawanNgLibro | 5.3% | #1 | #13 | |
| 134 | "Pamilya o Libro" | January 11, 2018 | #HaplosPamilyaOLibro | 5.2% | #1 | #14 | |
| 135 | "Escape" | January 12, 2018 | #HaplosEscape | 5.7% | #1 | #14 | |
| 136 | "Mansanas" | January 15, 2018 | #HaplosMansanas | 5.5% | #1 | #15 | |
| 137 | "Goodbye" | January 16, 2018 | #HaplosGoodbye | 5.7% | #1 | #11 | |
| 138 | "Agawan" | January 17, 2018 | #HaplosAgawan | 4.9% | #1 | #14 | |
| 139 | "Bagong Buhay" | January 18, 2018 | #HaplosBagongBuhay | 5.3% | #1 | #12 | |
| 140 | "Unang Kita" | January 19, 2018 | #HaplosUnangKita | 5.8% | #1 | #12 | |
| 141 | "Duda" | January 22, 2018 | #HaplosDuda | 4.9% | #1 | #14 | |
| 142 | "Third Day" | January 23, 2018 | #HaplosThirdDay | 4.8% | #1 | #14 | |
| 143 | "Airport" | January 24, 2018 | #HaplosAirport | 5.9% | #1 | #12 | |
| 144 | "Moving On" | January 25, 2018 | #HaplosMovingOn | 5.3% | #1 | #13 | |
| 145 | "Karma ni Lucille" | January 26, 2018 | #HaplosKarmaNiLucille | 5.0% | #1 | #15 | |
| 146 | "Wrinkled" | January 29, 2018 | #HaplosWrinkled | 4.9% | #1 | | |
| 147 | "Benedict's Proposal" | January 30, 2018 | #HaplosBenedictsProposal | 5.1% | #1 | | |
| 148 | "Bugbog" | January 31, 2018 | #HaplosBugbog | 5.8% | #1 | | |

=== February 2018 ===
| Episode | | Original air date | Social media hashtag | AGB Nielsen NUTAM People | | | Ref. |
| Episode | | Original air date | Social media hashtag | Rating | Timeslot rank | Whole day rank | Ref. |
|---|---|---|---|---|---|---|---|
| 149 | "Trust Fund" | February 1, 2018 | #HaplosTrustFund | 5.6% | #1 | #14 | |
| 150 | "Hilo" | February 2, 2018 | #HaplosHilo | 6.2% | #1 | #12 | |
| 151 | "Savior" | February 5, 2018 | #HaplosSavior | 5.7% | #1 | #14 | |
| 152 | "Return to Sender" | February 6, 2018 | #HaplosReturnToSender | 5.6% | #1 | #11 | |
| 153 | "Evil Kiss" | February 7, 2018 | #HaplosEvilKiss | 6.2% | #1 | #11 | |
| 154 | "Double Power" | February 8, 2018 | #HaplosDoublePower | 5.6% | #1 | #14 | |
| 155 | "Selos" | February 9, 2018 | #HaplosSelos | 6.0% | #1 | #14 | |
| 156 | "Gerald's Baby" | February 12, 2018 | #HaplosGeraldsBaby | 6.3% | #1 | #10 | |
| 157 | "Olga vs. Angela" | February 13, 2018 | #HaplosOlgaVSAngela | 6.0% | #1 | #12 | |
| 158 | "Bilin" | February 14, 2018 | #HaplosBilin | 6.3% | #1 | #13 | |
| 159 | "Abswelto" | February 15, 2018 | #HaplosAbswelto | 6.6% | #1 | #12 | |
| 160 | "Cornered" | February 16, 2018 | #HaplosCornered | 7.6% | #1 | #9 | |
| 161 | "Olga's Last Hurrah" | February 19, 2018 | #HaplosOlgasLastHurrah | 6.7% | #1 | #11 | |
| 162 | "Gerald's Healing" | February 20, 2018 | #HaplosGeraldsHealing | 6.4% | #1 | #11 | |
| 163 | "Jail Break" | February 21, 2018 | #HaplosJailBreak | 5.8% | #1 | #14 | |
| 164 | "Sacrifice" | February 22, 2018 | #HaplosSacrifice | 6.5% | #1 | #14 | |
| 165 | "Enchanting Finale" | February 23, 2018 | #HaplosEnchantingFinale | 6.6% | #1 | #13 | |
