= Haplos (TV series) =

Philippine television drama series

- Title card
- Also known as: Angela
- Genre: Horror drama
- Created by: Aloy Adlawan
- Written by: Lobert Villela; Jake Somera; Tina Samson-Velasco; Dang Sulit-Marino
- Directed by: Gil Tejada Jr.
- Creative director: Roy C. Iglesias
- Starring: Sanya Lopez; Thea Tolentino
- Theme music composer: Cecille G. Borja
- Opening theme: "Haplos" by Aicelle Santos
- Country of origin: Philippines
- Original language: Tagalog
- No. of episodes: 164 (list of episodes)

Production
- Executive producer: Reylie Manalo
- Camera setup: Multiple-camera setup
- Running time: 20–32 minutes
- Production company: GMA Entertainment TV

Original release
- Network: GMA Network
- Release: July 10, 2017 – February 23, 2018

Haplos (transl. caress / international title: Angela) is a Philippine television drama horror series broadcast by GMA Network. Directed by Gil Tejada Jr., it stars Sanya Lopez and Thea Tolentino. It premiered on July 10, 2017, on the network's Afternoon Prime line up. The series concluded on February 23, 2018, with a total of 164 episodes.

The series is streaming online on YouTube.

== Premise ==
Angela has an ability to heal others through her caress which she doesn't know yet. While her half-sister, Lucille has an ability in witchcraft. Angela's quiet life will be in trouble with the arrival of Lucille. Lucille will take everything away from Angela believing it is for her.

== Cast and characters ==
Cast

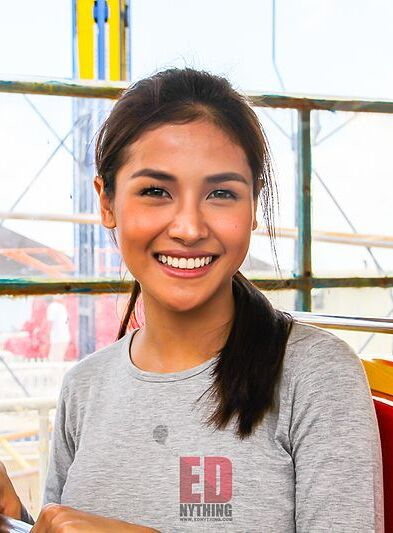
Sanya Lopez

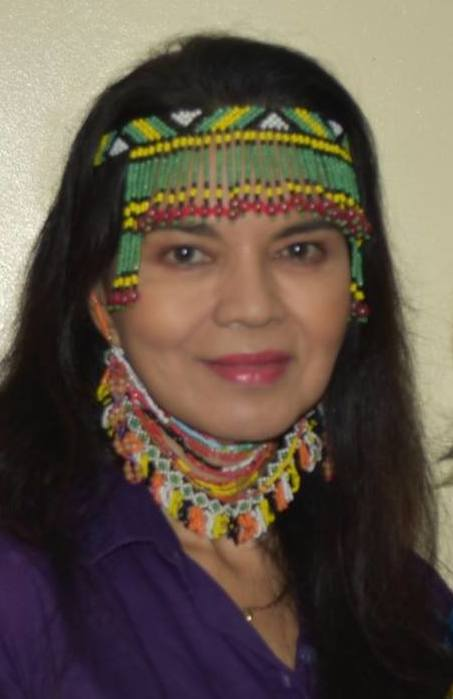
Maria Isabel Lopez

Lead cast

- Sanya Lopez as Angela Marie "Anj / Angela Marie" L. Alonzo-Cortez / Elang / Exotica / Alice
- Thea Tolentino as Lucille Bermudez / Rosella "Sella"

Supporting cast

- Pancho Magno as Benedict "Benny" Dizon / Eduardo Gomez
- Rocco Nacino as Gerald Cortez / John "Janjan" Montecines
- Emilio Garcia as Renato Alonzo
- Patricia Javier as Minda Luciano-Alonzo
- Francine Prieto as Mercedes "Cedes" Bermudez
- Diva Montelaba as Gwendolyn "Wendy" Reyes
- Kim Rodriguez as Olga Maglalim
- Mega Unciano as Mega
- Nikki Co as Jake
- Celia Rodriguez as Virginia "Biring" Alonzo
- Maria Isabel Lopez as Corazon "Cora" Maglalim
- Lito Legaspi as Eduardo "Doods" Dizon

Guest cast

- Ar Angel Aviles as younger Angela
- Geson Granado as younger Gerald
- Liezel Lopez as younger Mercedes
- Jillian Ward as teenage Angela
- Maey Bautista as Fely
- Betong Sumaya as Raul
- Lotlot de Leon as Stella Montecines
- Raquel Monteza as Adele "Del" Alonzo
- Mosang as Solis
- Marnie Lapuz as Gomez
- Pat Fernandez as Lita
- Priscilla Meirelles as Sally
- Mike Lloren as Fred Cortez
- Banjo Romero as Obet
- Ces Aldaba as a manager
- Mara Alberto as Nadia "Marikit"
- Paolo Gumabao as a doctor
- Paolo Paraiso as a soldier
- Jun Hidalgo as a hunter
- Gee Canlas as Irene
- Marlann Flores as Kara
- Mia Pangyarihan as Verna
- Cheche Tolentino as Didi
- Jholan Veluz as Cea
- Cynthia Yapchingco as Riri
- Maureen Larrazabal as Sol Españo
- Koreen Medina as a bar dancer
- Princess Guevarra as a massage therapist
- Catherine Rem as Diamond
- Louise Bolton as Lena
- Aira Bermudez as Nessa
- Hannah Precillas as Imee
- Ayeesha Cervantes as Leila
- Philip Lazaro as Sirena
- Ashley Cabrera as Ariana Alonzo Cortez

== Production ==
Principal photography commenced on May 31, 2017.

== Ratings ==
According to AGB Nielsen Philippines Nationwide Urban Television Audience Measurement People in television homes, the pilot episode of Haplos earned a 4.9% rating. The final episode scored a 6.6% rating. The series had its highest rating on September 12, 2017, with an 8.1% rating.
