= First Yaya =

2021 Philippine television drama series

- Title card
- Also known as: The First Nanny
- Genre: Drama; Romantic comedy
- Created by: Jojo Tawasil Nones; Marlon G. Miguel
- Written by: Jojo Tawasil Nones; Marlon G. Miguel; Christine Badillo-Novicio; Obet Villela
- Directed by: L.A. Madridejos
- Creative director: Aloy Adlawan
- Starring: Sanya Lopez
- Opening theme: "Ang Puso Kong Ito'y Sa'Yo" by Thea Astley
- Country of origin: Philippines
- Original language: Tagalog
- No. of episodes: 78 (list of episodes)

Production
- Executive producer: Mary Joy Lumboy-Pili
- Cinematography: Albert Banson
- Camera setup: Multiple-camera setup
- Running time: 24–39 minutes
- Production company: GMA Entertainment Group

Original release
- Network: GMA Network
- Release: March 15 – July 2, 2021

Related
- First Lady

First Yaya (transl. first nanny / international title: The First Nanny) is a 2021 Philippine television drama romance comedy series broadcast by GMA Network. Directed by L.A. Madridejos, it stars Sanya Lopez in the title role. It premiered on March 15, 2021 on the network's Telebabad line up. The series concluded on July 2, 2021, with a total of 78 episodes.

The series is streaming online on YouTube. A television sequel series, First Lady aired in 2022.

== Cast and characters ==
Cast

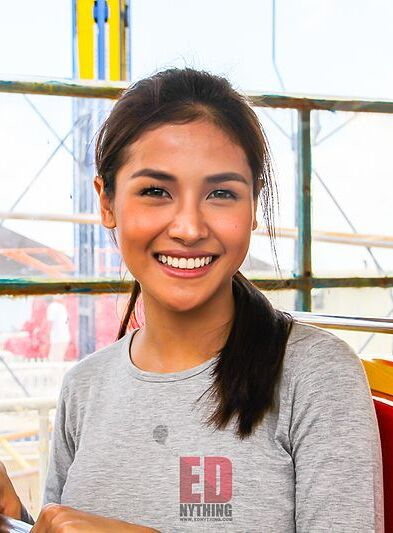
Sanya Lopez

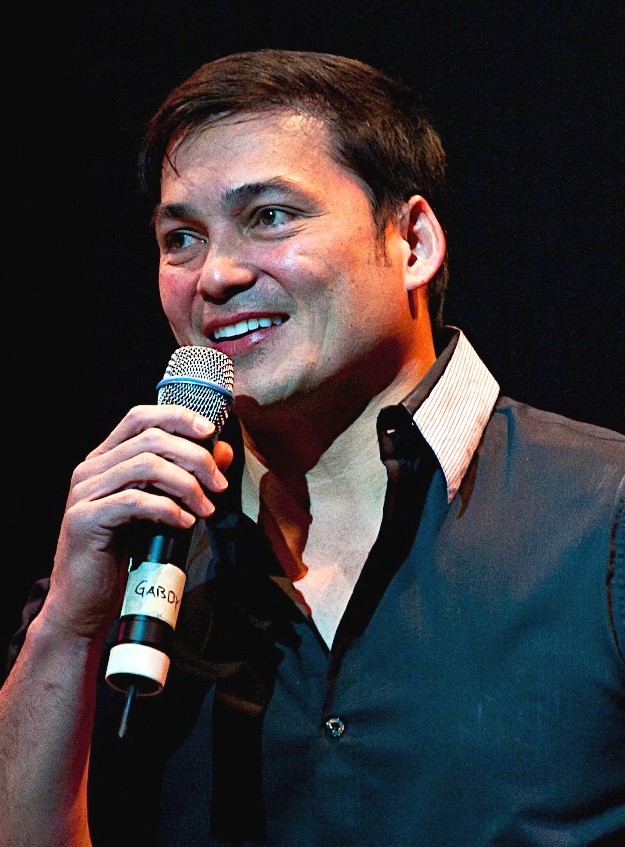
Gabby Concepcion

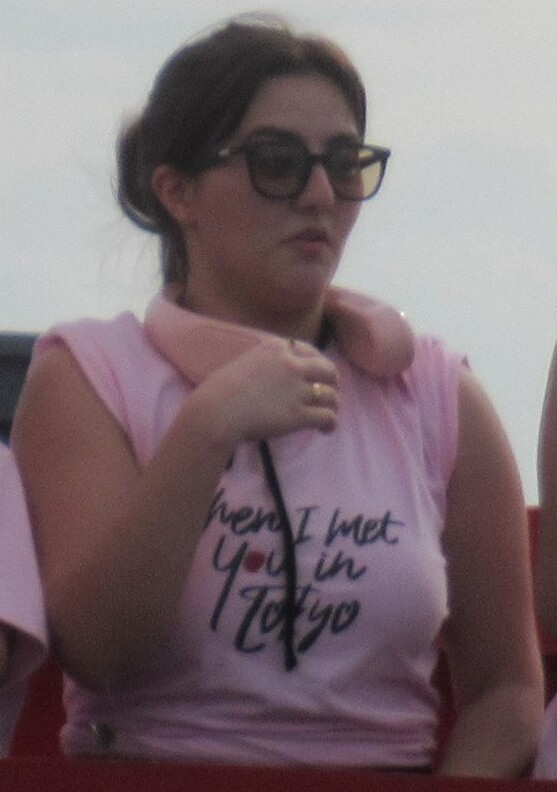
Cassy Legaspi

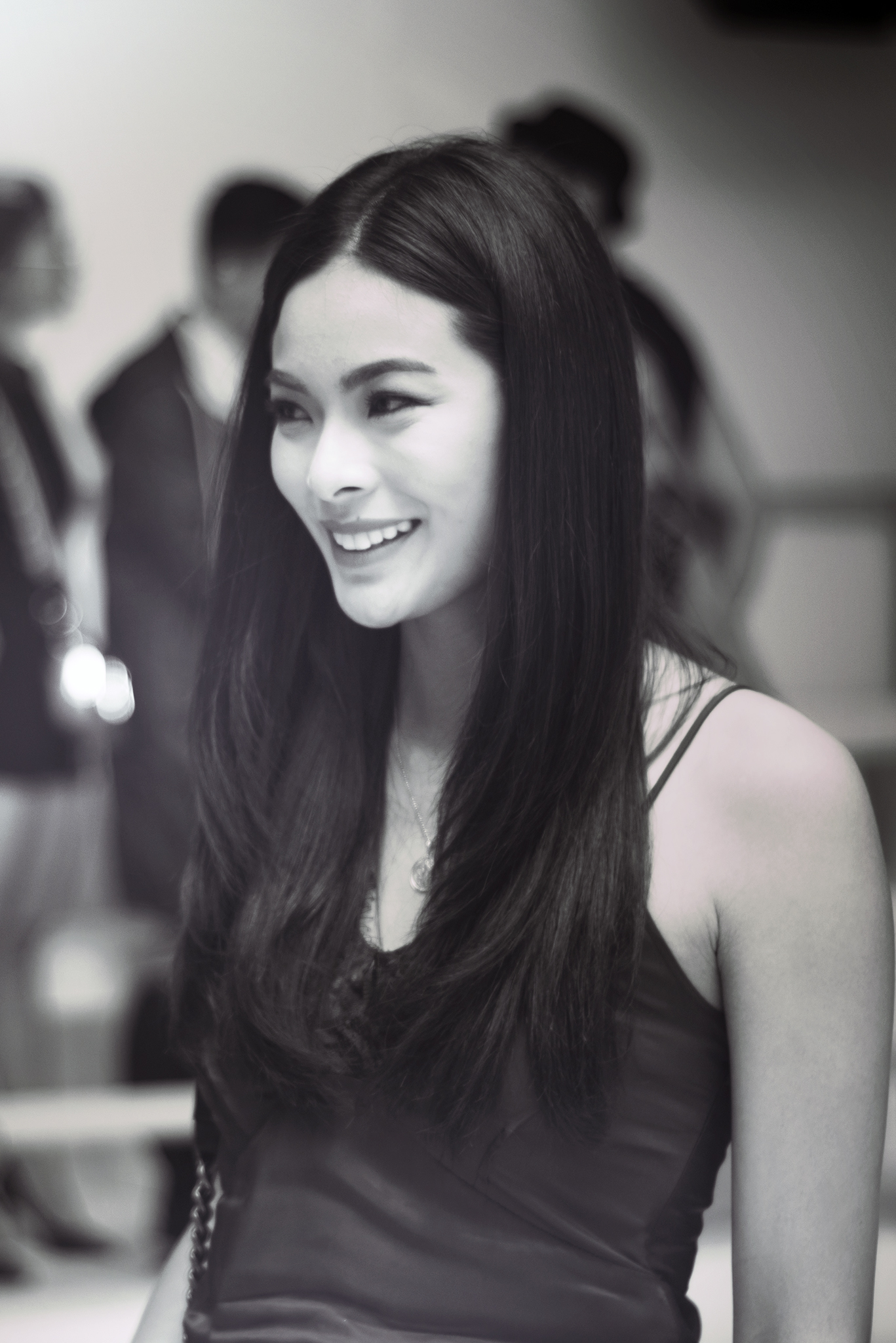
Maxine Medina

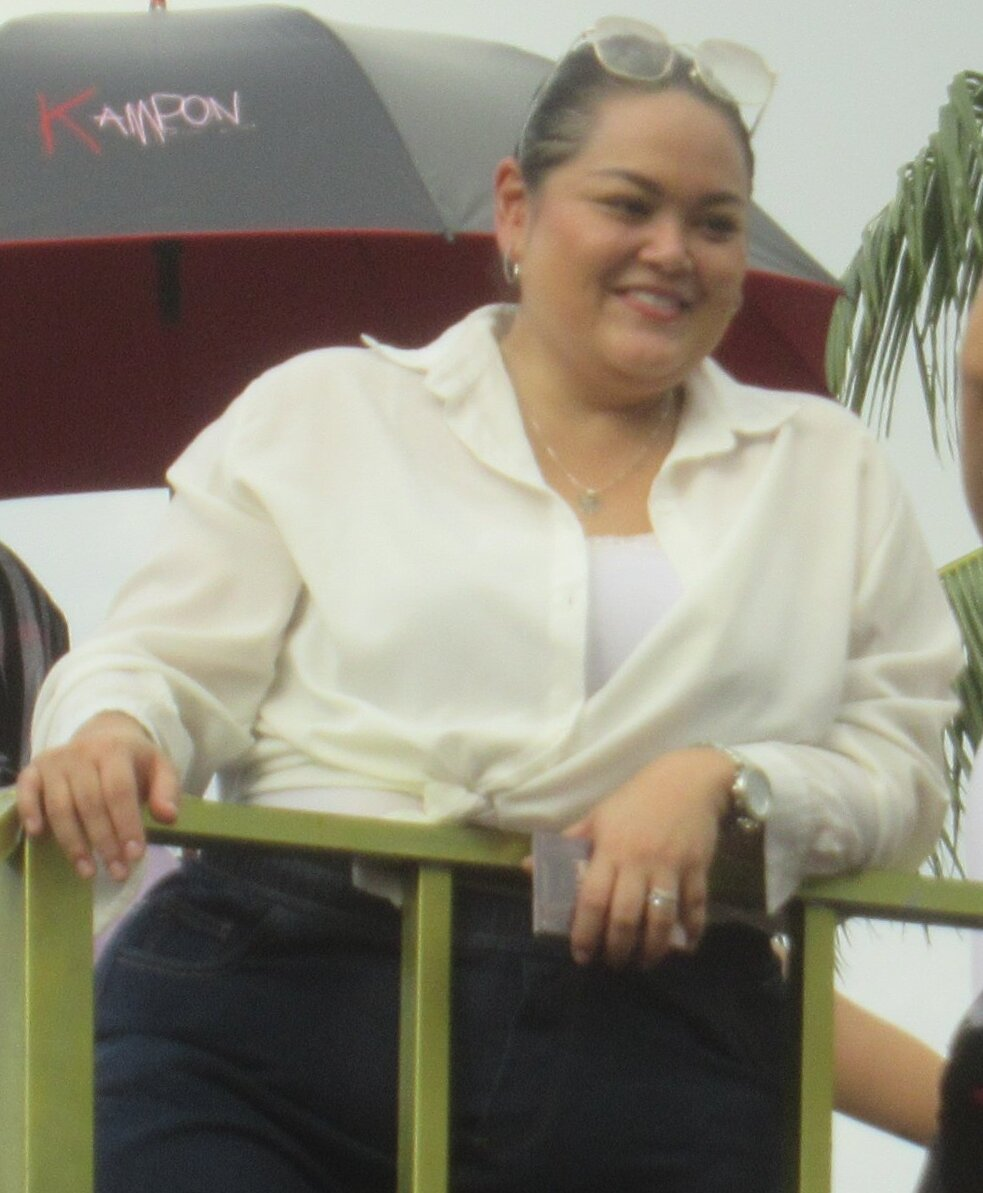
Cai Cortez

Lead cast

- Sanya Lopez as Melody Reyes-Acosta

Supporting cast

- Gabby Concepcion as Glenn Francisco Acosta
- Pancho Magno as Conrad Enriquez
- Cassy Legaspi as Nina Acosta
- Joaquin Domagoso as Jonas Clarito
- Sandy Andolong as Edna Reyes
- Gardo Versoza as Luis Prado
- Maxine Medina as Lorraine Prado
- Boboy Garovillo as Florencio Reyes
- Pilar Pilapil as Blessilda "Blessie" Acosta
- Kakai Bautista as Pepita San Jose
- Cai Cortez as Norma Robles
- Analyn Barro as Gemmalyn Rose "Gemrose" Reyes
- Thou Reyes as Yessey Reyes
- Patricia Coma as Nicole Acosta
- Clarence Delgado as Nathan Acosta
- Thia Thomalla as Valerie "Val" Cañete
- Jon Lucas as Titus de Villa
- Glenda Garcia as Marni Tupaz
- Anjo Damiles as Jasper Agcaoili
- Kiel Rodriguez as Paul Librada
- Jerick Dolormente as Lloyd Reyes
- Hailey Mendes as Charlotte "Charlie" Barboa

Guest cast

- Boots Anson-Roa as Diane Carlos
- Jean Garcia as Christine Acosta
- Andre Paras as Alexander Carlos
- Tommy Abuel as Anthony Carlos
- Allen Dizon as Subido
- Mikoy Morales as Jaime
- Jenzel Angeles as Paige
- Lovely Rivero as Viola
- Frances Makil-Ignacio as Rosales
- Wilma Doesnt as Matilda
- Issa Litton as Helena Buenaventura
- Michael Roy Jornales as Danilo Garcia
- Dennis Marasigan as Ezekiel Lopez
- Muriel Lomadilla as Beverly "Bevs" Oliveros
- Rollie Inocencio as Pedrito Conde
- Nicki Morena as Aila
- Julius Miguel as Osmond Buenaventura
- Atak as Impak
- Cecile Paz as Jess
- Chinggay Datu as Kathy Baluyot
- Lourdes Conde Serrano as Lourdes
- Michael Flores as Allan Buenaventura
- Marnie Lapus as Mercedeta "Mercy" L. Primavera
- Luis Hontiveros as Jason
- Teresa Loyzaga as Alessandra "Sandra" Robles
- Polo Ravales as Secretary Ordoñez

== Casting ==
In November 2019, Marian Rivera was hired to portray the role of First Yaya. Rivera left the series in September 2020, due to the safety protocols of the series' filming. Sanya Lopez was later hired as the replacement in October 2020. Actor Kelvin Miranda was also initially hired for the role of Jonas Clarito. He was pulled out from the series to appear in the drama series The Lost Recipe. Actor Joaquin Domagoso served as his replacement.

== Production ==
Principal photography commenced on March 10, 2020. Filming was halted on March 15, 2020, due to the enhanced community quarantine in Luzon caused by the COVID-19 pandemic. Filming was continued in November 2020. Filming concluded in May 2021.

== Ratings ==
According to AGB Nielsen Philippines' Nationwide Urban Television Audience Measurement People in television homes, the pilot episode of First Yaya earned a 23% rating. The final episode scored a 19.2% rating.

== Accolades ==
Accolades received by First Yaya
| Year | Award | Category | Recipient | Result | Ref. |
|---|---|---|---|---|---|
| 2023 | 35th PMPC Star Awards for Television | Best Drama Actor | Gabby Concepcion | Nominated | |
| 2023 | 35th PMPC Star Awards for Television | Best Drama Actress | Sanya Lopez | Nominated | |
| 2023 | 35th PMPC Star Awards for Television | Best Drama Supporting Actor | Gardo Versoza | Nominated | |
| 2023 | 35th PMPC Star Awards for Television | Best Drama Supporting Actress | Pilar Pilapil | Nominated | |
| 2023 | 35th PMPC Star Awards for Television | Best Primetime Drama Series | First Yaya | Nominated | |

== Legacy ==
A television series First Lady premiered on February 14, 2022, serving as a sequel to First Yaya. In August 2026, actress Sanya Lopez appeared in the 2026 Philippine television musical drama series Born to Shine in a guest role, portraying the same character.
