= List of First Yaya episodes =

First Yaya is a Philippine television drama series broadcast by GMA Network. It aired on the network's Telebabad line up and worldwide via GMA Pinoy TV from March 15 to July 2, 2021.

== Series overview ==
| Season | Episodes | Originally released | |
| Season | Episodes | First released | Last released |
|---|---|---|---|
| 1 | 78 | March 15, 2021 | July 2, 2021 |

== Episodes ==
| No. overall | No. in season | Title | Social media hashtag | Original release date | AGB Nielsen Ratings (NUTAM People) | Timeslot rank |
|---|---|---|---|---|---|---|
| 1 | 1 | "Meet the First Yaya" | #MeetTheFirstYaya | February 27, 2023 | 23.0% | #1 |
| 2 | 2 | "Pinagtagpo" (transl. Brought Together) | #FirstYayaPinagtagpo | February 28, 2023 | 23.4% | #1 |
| 3 | 3 | "Melody and VP" | #FirstYayaMelodyAndVP | March 1, 2023 | 21.6% | #1 |
| 4 | 4 | "Hired Ka Na" (transl. You're Hired) | #FirstYayaHiredKaNa | March 2, 2023 | 22.2% | #1 |
| 5 | 5 | "May Buzz" (transl. There's a Buzz) | #FirstYayaMayBuzz | March 3, 2023 | 22.1% | #1 |
| 6 | 6 | "Rescue Me" | #FirstYayaRescueMe | March 6, 2023 | 21.9% | #1 |
| 7 | 7 | "Trending" | #FirstYayaTrending | March 7, 2023 | N/A | TBA |
| 8 | 8 | "VP, Resign!" | #FirstYayaVPResign | March 8, 2023 | 20.0% | #1 |
| 9 | 9 | "New President" | #FirstYayaNewPresident | March 9, 2023 | 20.9% | #1 |
| 10 | 10 | "Palasyo" (transl. Palace) | #FirstYayaPalasyo | March 10, 2023 | 19.8% | #1 |
| 11 | 11 | "Mabuhay, VP!" (transl. Long Live VP!) | #FirstYayaMabuhayVP | March 13, 2023 | 20.9% | #1 |
| 12 | 12 | "Assassination" | #FirstYayaAssassination | March 14, 2023 | 22.5% | #1 |
| 13 | 13 | "Shooter" | #FirstYayaShooter | March 15, 2023 | 22.5% | #1 |
| 14 | 14 | "Chismis" (transl. Gossip) | #FirstYayaChismis | March 16, 2023 | 20.6% | #1 |
| 15 | 15 | "Conspiracy" | #FirstYayaConspiracy | March 17, 2023 | 21.5% | #1 |
| 16 | 16 | "First Yaya, Ganda Ka" (transl. First Yaya, You're Beautiful) | #FirstYayaGandaKa | March 20, 2023 | 21.6% | #1 |
| 17 | 17 | "First Yaya At the Ball" | #FirstYayaAtTheBall | March 21, 2023 | 22.9% | #1 |
| 18 | 18 | "Yakap" (transl. Hug) | #FirstYayaYakap | March 22, 2023 | 22.9% | #1 |
| 19 | 19 | "18 Roses" | #FirstYaya18Roses | March 23, 2023 | N/A | TBA |
| 20 | 20 | "First Yaya in Denial" | #FirstYayaInDenial | March 24, 2023 | 22.1% | #1 |
| 21 | 21 | "Not a Fairytale" | #FirstYayaNotAFairytale | March 27, 2023 | N/A | TBA |
| 22 | 22 | "First Yaya in the Rain" | #FirstYayaInTheRain | March 28, 2023 | 22.9% | #1 |
| 23 | 23 | "May Something" (transl. There Is Something) | #FirstYayaMaySomething | March 29, 2023 | 22.3% | #1 |
| 24 | 24 | "Selosan" (transl. Jealousy) | #FirstYayaSelosan | March 30, 2023 | 21.4% | #1 |
| 25 | 25 | "Kuryente Feels" (transl. Electric Feels) | #FirstYayaKuryenteFeels | March 31, 2023 | 22.3% | #1 |
| 26 | 26 | "Magkaiba" (transl. Different) | #FirstYayaMagkaiba | April 3, 2023 | 21.9% | #1 |
| 27 | 27 | "Sexy Yarn" | #FirstYayaSexyYarn | April 4, 2023 | 24.2% | #1 |
| 28 | 28 | "Secret Dinner" | #FirstYayaSecretDinner | April 5, 2023 | N/A | TBA |
| 29 | 29 | "Heartbroken" | #FirstYayaHeartbroken | April 10, 2023 | 21.9% | #1 |
| 30 | 30 | "Ang Sakit" (transl. It Hurts) | #FirstYayaAngSakit | April 11, 2023 | 22.1% | #1 |
| 31 | 31 | "VIP Visitor" | #FirstYayaVIPVisitor | April 12, 2023 | N/A | TBA |
| 32 | 32 | "Flashmob" | #FirstYayaFlashmob | April 13, 2023 | 21.9% | #1 |
| 33 | 33 | "Sana Tayo" (transl. I Hope We're Together) | #FirstYayaSanaTayo | April 14, 2023 | 21.6% | #1 |
| 34 | 34 | "Puso o Career" (transl. Heart or Career) | #FirstYayaPusoOCareer | April 17, 2023 | N/A | TBA |
| 35 | 35 | "Tamis" (transl. Sweet) | #FirstYayaTamis | April 18, 2023 | N/A | TBA |
| 36 | 36 | "First Yaya's Secret Love" | #FirstYayaSecretLove | April 19, 2023 | 22.1% | #1 |
| 37 | 37 | "Achieve" | #FirstYayaAchieve | April 20, 2023 | 21.1% | #1 |
| 38 | 38 | "Japorms" | #FirstYayaJaporms | April 21, 2023 | 21.1% | #1 |
| 39 | 39 | "Fight 4 Love" | #FirstYayaFight4Love | April 24, 2023 | 21.2% | #1 |
| 40 | 40 | "Holding Hands" | #FirstYayaHoldingHands | April 25, 2023 | 20.7% | #1 |
| 41 | 41 | "Flowers 4 u" | #FirstYayaFlowers4U | April 26, 2023 | 22.0% | #1 |
| 42 | 42 | "Special Ka" (transl. You're Special) | #FirstYayaSpecialKa | April 27, 2023 | 21.8% | #1 |
| 43 | 43 | "Kutob" (transl. Beat) | #FirstYayaKutob | April 28, 2023 | 20.9% | #1 |
| 44 | 44 | "Flashback" | #FirstYayaFlashback | May 1, 2023 | 20.4% | #1 |
| 45 | 45 | "OMG" | #FirstYayaOMG | May 2, 2023 | N/A | TBA |
| 46 | 46 | "Kayo Na Ba?" (transl. Are You Together?) | #FirstYayaKayoNaBa | May 3, 2023 | 21.1% | #1 |
| 47 | 47 | "Confession" | #FirstYayaConfession | May 4, 2023 | N/A | TBA |
| 48 | 48 | "Fake News" | #FirstYayaFakeNews | May 5, 2023 | 19.5% | #1 |
| 49 | 49 | "Basher" | #FirstYayaBasher | March 27, 2023 | 18.2% | #1 |
| 50 | 50 | "My Family" | #FirstYayaMyFamily | March 28, 2023 | 20.1% | #1 |
| 51 | 51 | "First Yaya Sa Palasyo" (transl. First Yaya in the Palace) | #FirstYayaSaPalasyo | March 29, 2023 | 19.2% | #1 |
| 52 | 52 | "Pak Ganern" | #FirstYayaPakGanern | March 30, 2023 | N/A | TBA |
| 53 | 53 | "Connected" | #FirstYayaConnected | March 31, 2023 | N/A | TBA |
| 54 | 54 | "Anong Secret?" (transl. What Secret?) | #FirstYayaAnongSecret | April 3, 2023 | 19.3% | #1 |
| 55 | 55 | "First Yaya's First BF" | #FirstYayaFirstBF | April 4, 2023 | 18.6% | #1 |
| 56 | 56 | "We Support PGA" | #FirstYayaWeSupportPGA | April 5, 2023 | 19.9% | #1 |
| 57 | 57 | "Suklay" (transl. Comb) | #FirstYayaSuklay | April 6, 2023 | 19.5% | #1 |
| 58 | 58 | "Kundiman Malaya" (transl. Free Love Song) | #FirstYayaKundimanMalaya | April 7, 2023 | 18.8% | #1 |
| 59 | 59 | "The Incident" | #FirstYayaTheIncident | April 10, 2023 | 17.9% | #1 |
| 60 | 60 | "The Truth" | #FirstYayaTheTruth | April 11, 2023 | 18.1% | #1 |
| 61 | 61 | "Goodbye Na Ba?" (transl. Is This Goodbye?) | #FirstYayaGoodbyeNaBa | April 12, 2023 | 18.8% | #1 |
| 62 | 62 | "First Yaya, Love Ka Namin" (transl. First Yaya, We Love You) | #FirstYayaLoveKaNamin | April 13, 2023 | 18.5% | #1 |
| 63 | 63 | "First Yaya, Be Happy" | #FirstYayaBeHappy | April 14, 2023 | 17.4% | #1 |
| 64 | 64 | "First Yaya, Magtiwala Ka" (transl. First Yaya, Have Trust) | #FirstYayaMagtiwalaKa | April 17, 2023 | 18.2% | #1 |
| 65 | 65 | "Para sa Pamilya" (transl. For the Family) | #FirstYayaParaSaPamilya | April 18, 2023 | N/A | TBA |
| 66 | 66 | "Win Her Back" | #FirstYayaWinHerBack | April 19, 2023 | 16.9% | #1 |
| 67 | 67 | "Not Her Fault" | #FirstYayaNotHerFault | April 20, 2023 | N/A | TBA |
| 68 | 68 | "Peace Offering" | #FirstYayaPeaceOffering | April 21, 2023 | N/A | TBA |
| 69 | 69 | "First Yaya's New Work" | #FirstYayaNewWork | April 24, 2023 | 17.8% | #1 |
| 70 | 70 | "Saan Papanig?" (transl. Who to Side With?) | #FirstYayaSaanPapanig | April 25, 2023 | 17.8% | #1 |
| 71 | 71 | "Yakap" (transl. Hug) | #FirstYayaYakap | April 26, 2023 | N/A | TBA |
| 72 | 72 | "Two Mothers" | #FirstYayaTwoMothers | April 27, 2023 | 18.5% | #1 |
| 73 | 73 | "First Yaya, Salamat Sayo" (transl. First Yaya, Thank You) | #FirstYayaSalamatSayo | April 28, 2023 | 17.7% | #1 |
| 74 | 74 | "Ever After" | #FirstYayaEverAfter | May 1, 2023 | 17.8% | #1 |
| 75 | 75 | "GlenDy" | #FirstYayaGlenDy | May 2, 2023 | N/A | TBA |
| 76 | 76 | "Love Wins" | #FirstYayaLoveWins | May 3, 2023 | 17.9% | #1 |
| 77 | 77 | "First Yaya, Will You?" | #FirstYayaWillYou | May 4, 2023 | N/A | TBA |
| 78 | 78 | "First Lady" | #FirstYayaFirstLady | May 5, 2023 | 19.2% | #1 |
