= Anjo Damiles =

Filipino actor

- Born: Joseph Roland Damiles; May 10, 1996 (age 29); Las Piñas, Philippines
- Occupations: Actor; Model; Brand Ambassador
- Agents: Star Magic (2014–2019); Sparkle GMA Artist Center (2019–2025); Viva Artists Agency (2025–present)
- Height: 1.75 m (5 ft 9 in)
- Relatives: Boy Abunda (grand-uncle); Aileen Damiles (aunt)
- Website: www.instagram.com/anjodamiles10/

Joseph Roland Beltran Damiles (born May 10, 1996), better known as Anjo Damiles, is a Filipino actor and commercial model.

In 2015 he became one of the leading men of actress Julia Montes as Andrew "Andy" Delgado in the afternoon melodrama series Doble Kara and thought of it as his biggest break yet in showbiz. Damiles is also known for portraying the role of Jasper Agcaoili in First Yaya and First Lady.

== Personal life ==
He is a grandnephew of TV host/talent manager Boy Abunda and a nephew of former beauty queen Miss Universe 1996 candidate Aileen Damiles, his father's younger sister.

== Career ==
Damiles started to work in commercials and print ads at the age of eight. He first appeared in Candy Magazine (September 2011). He has been seen having guest roles in ABS CBN series Forevermore of 2014 as Jonathan Acosta with Enrique Gil and Liza Soberano, Ipaglaban mo, Maalaala mo kaya and Wansapanatym with James Reid and Nadine Lustre. He trended on Twitter when he had his first guesting on Gandang Gabi, Vice! with Albie Casiño and Edgar Allan Guzman.

He joined Star Magic on 2015 and at the 7th Annual Star Magic Games, Damiles bagged the adult division's Rookie of the Year award. Later of 2015, he got the role of Andy Delgado as one Julia Montes leading men in Doble Kara.

In July 2019 he transferred to GMA Artist Center (later Sparkle) after five years with Star Magic.

== Business ==
Damiles opened his food business, The Breakfast Menu in 2020.

== Filmography ==
=== Film ===
Year	Title	Role
2015	Just The Way You Are	Ricky
2017	Foolish Love	Erickson
2019	Ang Henerasyong Sumuko Sa Love	

=== Television ===
Year	Title	Role
2014	Forevermore	Jonathan Acosta
2014	ASAP: Chillout	Himself / Guest co-host
2015–2017	Doble Kara	Andrew "Andy" Delgado
2015	Maalaala Mo Kaya: Sinigang	Reymark
2016	Gandang Gabi, Vice!	Himself
2016	Ipaglaban Mo: Pagkakasala Ng Ama	Miguel
2017	Maalaala Mo Kaya: Bituin	Rex
2017	Wansapanataym: Anika Pintasera	Bryle Tabora
2017	Wattpad Presents: Breaking The Bad Boy	Caleb
2017	La Luna Sangre	Angelo
2017	The Promise of Forever	adult Adrien Espinosa
2018	Ipaglaban Mo: Hazing	Ian James Pascual
2018	Wansapanatayn: Gelli In A Bottle	Hubert
2019	Dear Uge	Timothy
2019	Pepito Manaloto	Perfect
2019	Daig Kayo ng Lola Ko: Love from Beyond	Jigs
2019	Daddy's Gurl	Ipe
2019–2020	Madrasta	George
2020	Wish Ko Lang!	Brix
2020	Wish Ko Lang: Bangkay	Francis Hernandez
2020	Imbestigador	Marvin Ferreras
2021	First Yaya	Jasper Agcaoili
2021	Stories from the Heart: Love on Air	Vincent Rivera
2022	First Lady	Jasper Agcaoili
2022	Tadhana: Ligaya	Mico
2022	Abot-Kamay na Pangarap	Oscar
2023	Stolen Life	Vincent "Vince" Rigor
