= First Lady (Philippine TV series) =

2022 Philippine television drama series

- Genre: Drama; Romantic comedy
- Directed by: L.A. Madridejos
- Starring: Sanya Lopez
- Opening theme: "Ang Puso Kong Ito'y Sa'Yo" by Thea Astley
- Country of origin: Philippines
- Original language: Tagalog
- No. of episodes: 97

Production
- Executive producer: Mary Joy Lumboy-Pili
- Camera setup: Multiple-camera setup
- Running time: 24–42 minutes
- Production company: GMA Entertainment Group

Original release
- Network: GMA Network
- Release: February 14 – July 1, 2022

Related
- First Yaya

First Lady is a 2022 Philippine television drama romance comedy series broadcast by GMA Network. The series served as a sequel to the 2021 television series First Yaya. Directed by L.A. Madridejos, it stars Sanya Lopez in the title role. It premiered on February 14, 2022, on the network's Telebabad line up. The series concluded on July 1, 2022, with a total of 97 episodes.

The series is streaming online on YouTube.

== Cast and characters ==
Cast

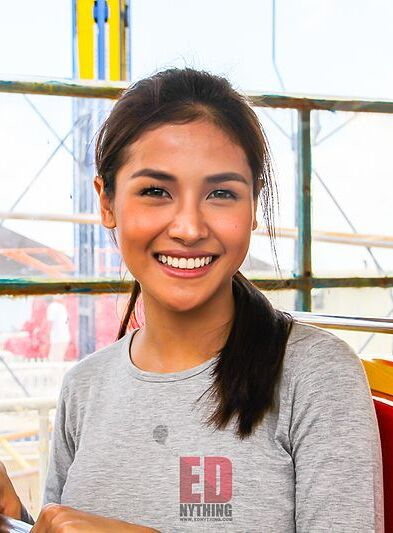
Sanya Lopez

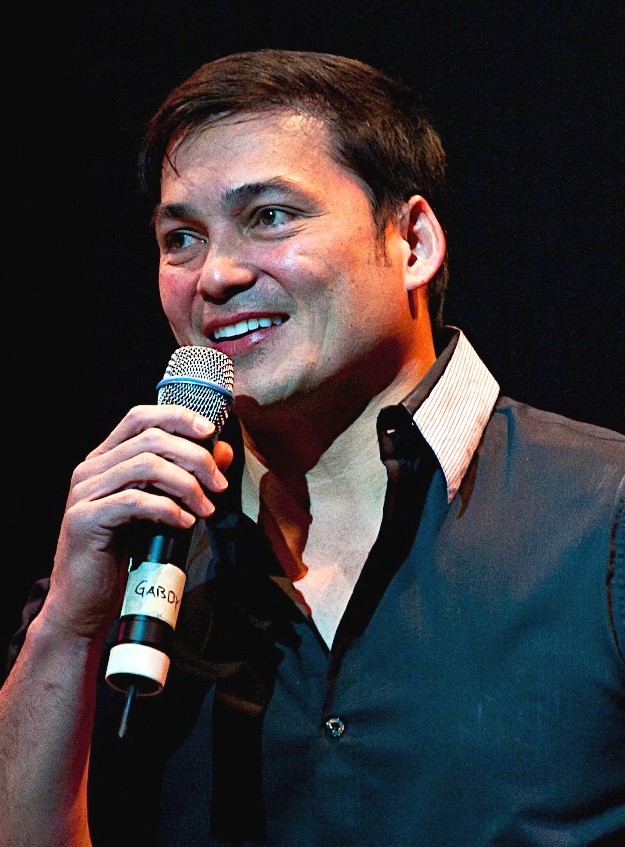
Gabby Concepcion

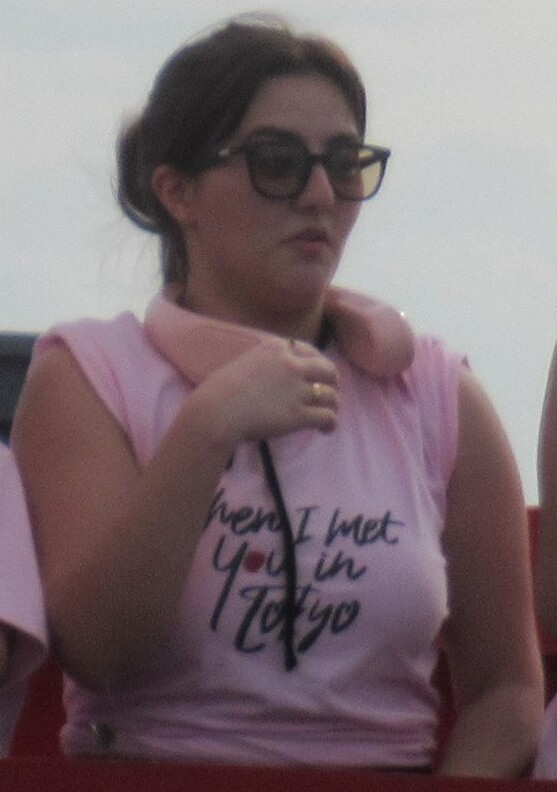
Cassy Legaspi

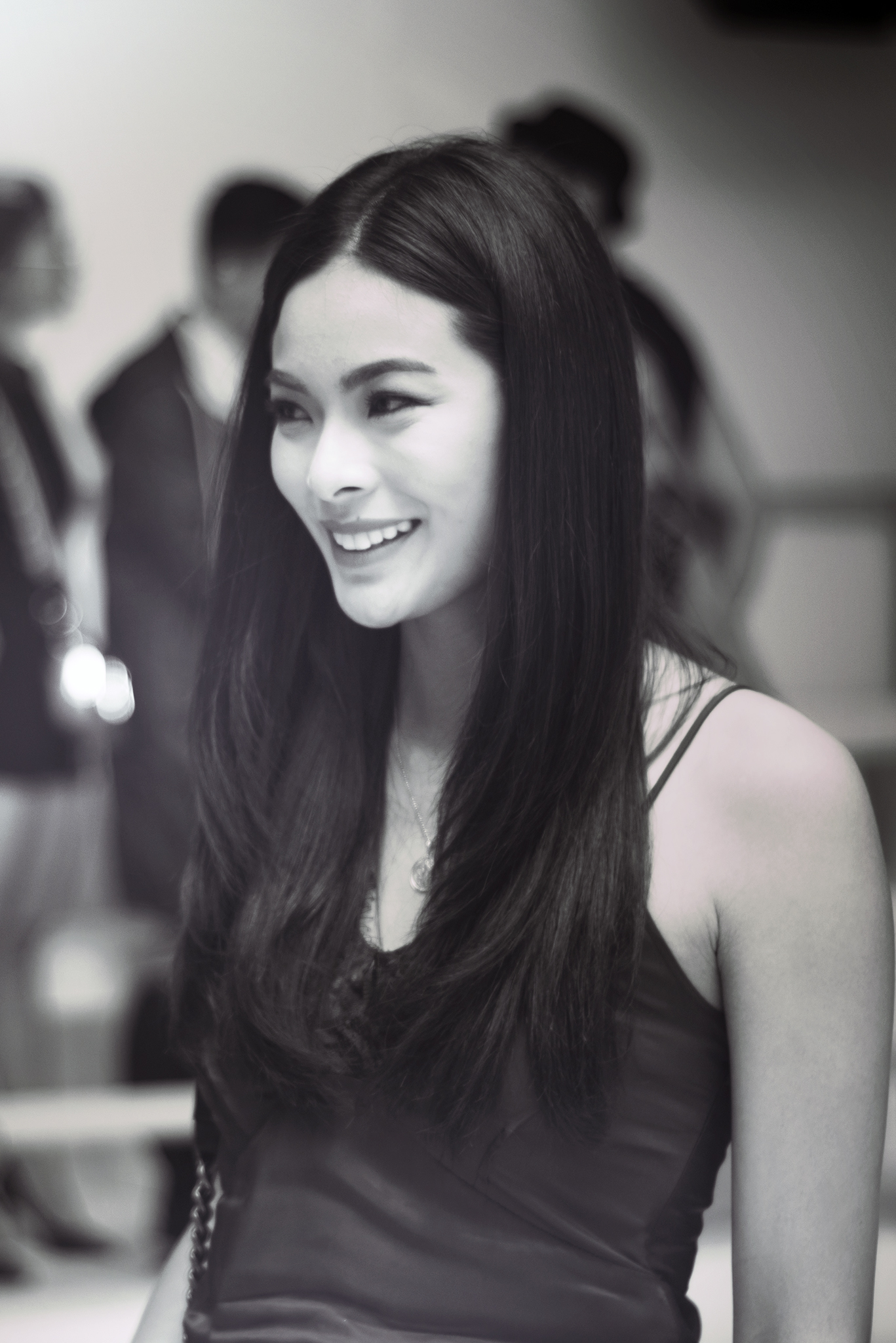
Maxine Medina

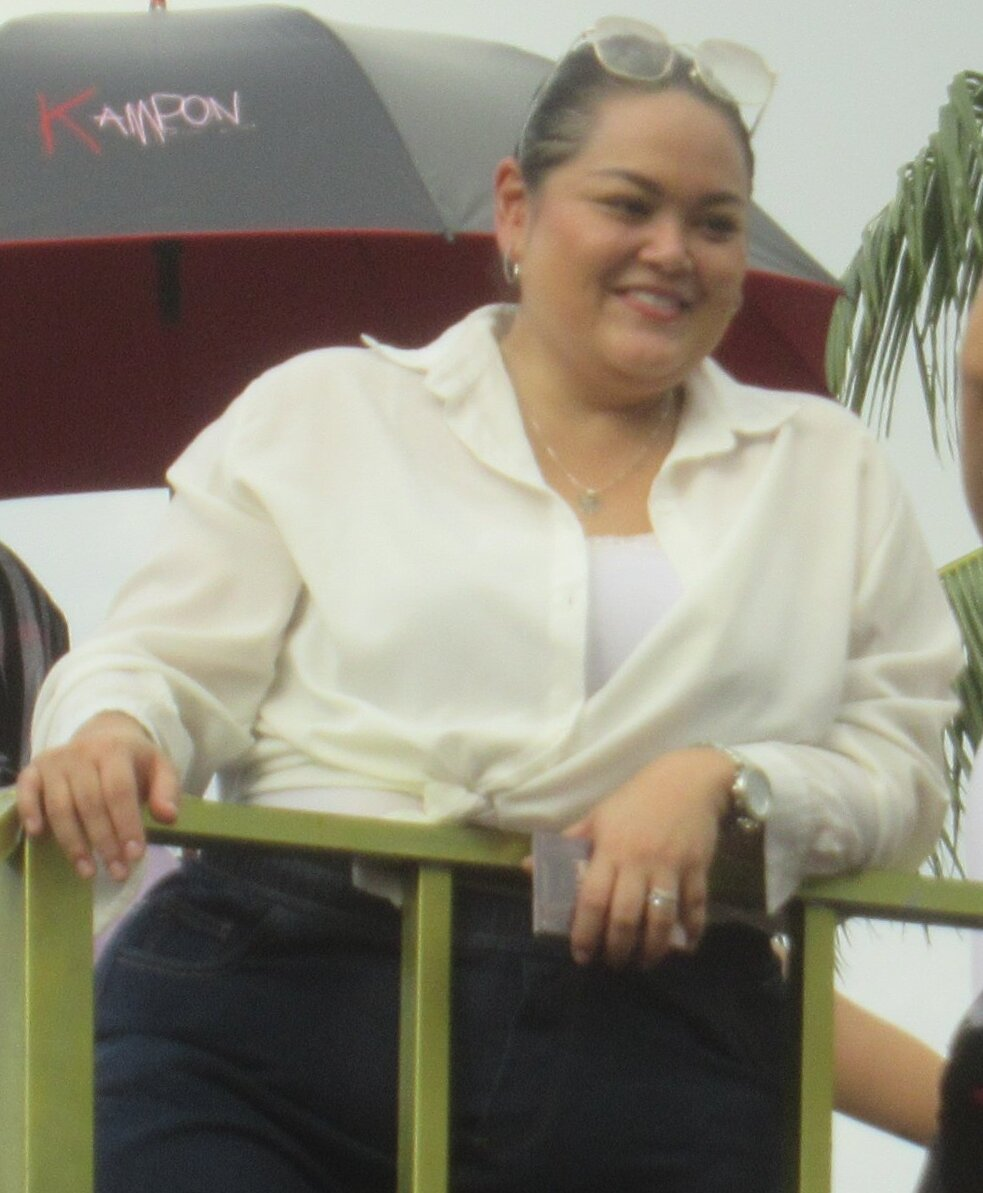
Cai Cortez

Lead cast

- Sanya Lopez as Melody Reyes-Acosta

Supporting cast

- Gabby Concepcion as Glenn Francisco W. Acosta
- Alice Dixson as Ingrid Domingo
- Rocco Nacino as Moises Valentin
- Pancho Magno as Conrad Enriquez
- Pilar Pilapil as Blesilda Wenceslao-Acosta
- Cassy Legaspi as Janina "Nina" Valdez Acosta
- Patricia Coma as Nicolette "Nicole" Domingo-Acosta
- Clarence Delgado as Nathaniel "Nathan" Valdez Acosta
- Boboy Garovillo as Florencio Reyes
- Sandy Andolong as Edna Reyes
- Analyn Barro as Gemrose Reyes-Agcaoili
- Jerick Dolormente as Lloyd Reyes
- Isabel Rivas as Allegra Trinidad
- Francine Prieto as Soledad Cortez
- Samantha Lopez as Ambrocia Bolivar
- Thou Reyes as Yessey Reyes
- Maxine Medina as Lorraine Prado-Reyes
- Joaquin Domagoso as Jonas Clarito
- Kakai Bautista as Pepita San Jose
- Cai Cortez as Norma Robles
- Thia Thomalla as Valerie "Val" Cañete
- Jon Lucas as Titus de Villa
- Glenda Garcia as Marnie Tupaz
- Anjo Damiles as Jasper Agcaoili
- Kiel Rodriguez as Paul Librada
- Muriel Lomadilla as Beverly "Bevs" Oliveros
- Divine Aucina as Bella Llamanzares
- Shyr Valdez as Sioning Lagman

Guest cast

- Shannelle Agustin as Max
- Jhoana Marie Tan as Maila
- John Feir as Teddy
- Dennis Marasigan as Ezekiel
- Jestoni Alarcon as Anastacio
- Glaiza de Castro as Ciara P. Reyna
- Rabiya Mateo as Ashanti P.
- Carla Abellana as Andrea Salcedo
- Sam Nielsen as younger Ingrid

== Production ==
Principal photography commenced on November 18, 2021. Filming resumed in January 2022. Filming concluded in June 2022.

== Ratings ==
According to AGB Nielsen Philippines' Nationwide Urban Television Audience Measurement People in television homes, the pilot episode of First Lady earned a 14.4% rating. The final episode scored a 17.1% rating.

== Legacy ==
In August 2026, actress Sanya Lopez appeared in the 2026 Philippine television musical drama series Born to Shine in a guest role, portraying the same character.
