= Flex (TV program) =

Philippine television variety show

- Title card
- Genre: Variety show
- Directed by: Treb Monteras II
- Presented by: Mavy Legaspi; Lexi Gonzales; Joaquin Domagoso; Althea Ablan
- Country of origin: Philippines
- Original language: Tagalog

Production
- Camera setup: Multiple-camera setup
- Production company: GMA Entertainment Group

Original release
- Network: GTV
- Release: July 4 – August 22, 2021

Flex is a 2021 Philippine television variety show broadcast by GTV. Hosted by Mavy Legaspi, Lexi Gonzales, Althea Ablan and Joaquin Domagoso, it premiered on July 4, 2021 on the network's Sunday evening line up. The show concluded on August 22, 2021.

== Cast ==
- Mavy Legaspi
- Lexi Gonzales
- Joaquin Domagoso
- Althea Ablan
