= List of Dahil sa Pag-ibig episodes =

Dahil sa Pag-ibig (transl. Because of Love / International title: For Love or Money) is a 2019 Philippine television drama suspense series broadcast by GMA Network. It premiered on the network's Afternoon Prime line up and worldwide via GMA Pinoy TV on May 20, 2019, replacing Inagaw na Bituin.

NUTAM (Nationwide Urban Television Audience Measurement) People in Television Homes ratings are provided by AGB Nielsen Philippines while Kantar Media Philippines provide Nationwide ratings (Urban + Rural).

The series ended, but it's the 20th-week run, and with 100 episodes. It was replaced by Madrasta.

== Series overview ==
Month	Episodes	Monthly average
Month	Episodes	NUTAM
May 2019	10	5.5%
June 2019	20	5.4%
July 2019	23	6.1%
August 2019	22	5.9%
September 2019	21	5.9%
October 2019	4	6.4%
Total	100	5.9%

== Episodes ==
=== May 2019 ===
Episode		Original air date	Social media hashtag	AGB Nielsen NUTAM People in Television Homes		Ref.
Episode		Original air date	Social media hashtag	Rating	Timeslot rank	Ref.
1	"Pilot"	May 20, 2019	#DahilSaPagIbig	5.2%	#2	
2	"The Crime"	May 21, 2019	#DSPTheCrime	5.6%	#2	
3	"Blood Money"	May 22, 2019	#DSPBloodMoney	5.9%	#2	
4	"The Savior"	May 23, 2019	#DSPTheSavior	5.5%	#2	
5	"Indecent Proposal"	May 24, 2019	#DSPIndecentProposal	5.3%	#2	
6	"Deadline"	May 27, 2019	#DSPDeadline	4.5%	#2	
7	"Sex for Money"	May 28, 2019	#DSPSexForMoney	5.9%	#2	
8	"Saving Eldon"	May 29, 2019	#DSPSavingEldon	5.4%	#2	
9	"Secrets"	May 30, 2019	#DSPSecrets	5.6%	#2	
10	"Accusation"	May 31, 2019	#DSPAccusation	5.8%	#2	

=== June 2019 ===
Episode		Original air date	Social media hashtag	AGB Nielsen NUTAM People in Television Homes		Ref.
Episode		Original air date	Social media hashtag	Rating	Timeslot rank	Ref.
11	"Denial"	June 3, 2019	#DSPDenial	5.9%	#2	
12	"Tamang Duda" (transl. Right Doubt)	June 4, 2019	#DSPTamangDuda	5.4%	#2	
13	"New Baby"	June 5, 2019	#DSPNewBaby	5.7%	#2	
14	"Real Father"	June 6, 2019	#DSPRealFather	4.9%	#2	
15	"Face Off"	June 7, 2019	#DSPFaceOff	6.0%	#2	
16	"Dalawang Ama" (transl. Two Fathers)	June 10, 2019	#DSPDalawangAma	6.0%	#2	
17	"Secret Father"	June 11, 2019	#DSPSecretFather	5.9%	#2	
18	"Hero"	June 12, 2019	#DSPHero	6.3%	#1	
19	"Ceasefire"	June 13, 2019	#DSPCeasefire	5.5%	#1	
20	"Revelation"	June 14, 2019	#DSPRevelation	4.9%	#2	
21	"Galit ni Eldon" (transl. Eldon's Anger)	June 17, 2019	#DSPGalitNiEldon	5.1%	#2	
22	"Abuso" (transl. Abuse)	June 18, 2019	#DSPAbuso	5.6%	#2	
23	"Worried Mother"	June 19, 2019	#DSPWorriedMother	5.2%	#1	
24	"Eldon vs. Gary"	June 20, 2019	#DSPEldonVSGary	5.1%	#1	
25	"Biyenan" (transl. Mother-in-Law)	June 21, 2019	#DSPBiyenan	5.1%	#1	
26	"Para sa Anak" (transl. For the Child)	June 24, 2019	#DSPParaSaAnak	5.2%	#1	
27	"Pag-aayos" (transl. Reconciliation)	June 25, 2019	#DSPPagAayos	5.1%	#2	
28	"Sorry Not Sorry"	June 26, 2019	#DSPSorryNotSorry	5.6%	#1	
29	"Portia Returns"	June 27, 2019	#DSPPortiaReturns	5.3%	#2	
30	"Meet Up"	June 28, 2019	#DSPMeetUp	4.9%	#1	

=== July 2019 ===
Episode		Original air date	Social media hashtag	AGB Nielsen NUTAM People in Television Homes		Ref.
Episode		Original air date	Social media hashtag	Rating	Timeslot rank	Ref.
31	"Tulong ni Gary" (transl. Gary's Help)	July 1, 2019	#DSPTulongNiGary	6.4%	#1	
32	"Halik" (transl. Kiss)	July 2, 2019	#DSPHalik	5.9%	#1	
33	"Cheaters"	July 3, 2019	#DSPCheaters	5.7%	#2	
34	"Portia's Game"	July 4, 2019	#DSPPortiasGame	4.9%	#2	
35	"Tensyon" (transl. Tension)	July 5, 2019	#DSPTensyon	5.0%	#2	
36	"In Denial"	July 8, 2019	#DSPInDenial	5.1%	#2	
37	"Wife's Instinct"	July 9, 2019	#DSPWifesInstinct	5.9%	#2	
38	"Follow Eldon"	July 10, 2019	#DSPFollowEldon	5.7%	#2	
39	"Taguan" (transl. Hiding)	July 11, 2019	#DSPTaguan	6.1%	#1	
40	"Mariel vs. Portia"	July 12, 2019	#DSPMarielVsPortia	6.2%	#2	
41	"Painful Truth"	July 15, 2019	#DSPPainfulTruth	6.1%	#1	
42	"Ganti ni Mariel" (transl. Mariel's Revenge)	July 16, 2019	#DSPGantiNiMariel	7.3%	#1	
43	"Agawan" (transl. Rivalry)	July 17, 2019	#DSPAgawan	7.7%	#1	
44	"Mag-iina" (transl. Mother and Child)	July 18, 2019	#DSPMagIina	6.8%	#1	
45	"Hiwalayan" (transl. Separation)	July 19, 2019	#DSPHiwalayan	6.8%	#1	
46	"Sugod, Portia" (transl. Dash, Portia)	July 22, 2019	#DSPSugodPortia	5.9%	#2	
47	"Lost and Found"	July 23, 2019	#DSPLostAndFound	5.9%	#2	
48	"Linlang" (transl. Deceive)	July 24, 2019	#DSPLinlang	6.0%	#2	
49	"Hanapan" (transl. Searching)	July 25, 2019	#DSPHanapan	5.9%	#2	
50	"Takot" (transl. Fear)	July 26, 2019	#DSPTakot	6.4%	#2	
51	"Alas ni Portia" (transl. Portia's Ace)	July 29, 2019	#DSPAlasNiPortia	6.1%	#2	
52	"Dalawang Ama" (transl. Two Fathers)	July 30, 2019	#DSPDalawangAma	5.9%	#1	
53	"Gatecrasher"	July 31, 2019	#DSPGatecrasher	6.5%	#1	

=== August 2019 ===
Episode		Original air date	Social media hashtag	AGB Nielsen NUTAM People in Television Homes		Ref.
Episode		Original air date	Social media hashtag	Rating	Timeslot rank	Ref.
54	"Hanap Gulo" (transl. Find Trouble)	August 1, 2019	#DSPHanapGulo	6.5%	#1	
55	"Backfire"	August 2, 2019	#DSPBackfire	6.1%	#1	
56	"Galit ni Eldon" (transl. Eldon's Anger)	August 5, 2019	#DSPGalitNiEldon	6.9%	#1	
57	"Ganti" (transl. Revenge)	August 6, 2019	#DSPGanti	6.3%	#1	
58	"Fake Witness"	August 7, 2019	#DSPFakeWitness	6.0%	#1	
59	"Tunay na Damdamin" (transl. Real Feelings)	August 8, 2019	#DSPTunayNaDamdamin	6.4%	#1	
60	"Truth and Lies"	August 9, 2019	#DSPTruthAndLies	6.3%	#1	
61	"Change of Heart"	August 12, 2019	#DSPChangeOfHeart	6.0%	#1	
62	"Tunay na Pagibig" (transl. Real Love)	August 13, 2019	#DSPTunayNaPagibig	5.9%	#1	
63	"Bagong Buhay" (transl. New Life)	August 14, 2019	#DSPBagongBuhay	6.1%	#1	
64	"Jealous Father"	August 15, 2019	#DSPJealousFather	5.4%	#1	
65	"Doble Higanti" (transl. Double Revenge)	August 16, 2019	#DSPDobleHiganti	5.4%	#1	
66	"Mastermind"	August 19, 2019	#DSPMastermind	5.0%	#2	
67	"Desperada" (transl. Desperate)	August 20, 2019	#DSPDesperada	5.5%	#2	
68	"Dead End"	August 21, 2019	#DSPDeadEnd	6.0%	#1	
69	"Away Magulang" (transl. Parents Fight)	August 22, 2019	#DSPAwayMagulang	5.6%	#2	
70	"Ang Paghihiganti" (transl. The Revenge)	August 23, 2019	#DSPAngPaghihiganti	5.8%	#2	
71	"In Danger"	August 26, 2019	#DSPInDanger	6.0%	#1	
72	"Finding Justine"	August 27, 2019	#DSPFindingJustine	5.8%	#2	
73	"Portia's Trap"	August 28, 2019	#DSPPortiasTrap	5.8%	#2	
74	"Palit Peligro" (transl. Change Danger)	August 29, 2019	#DSPPalitPeligro	5.3%	#1	
75	"Laban, Mariel" (transl. Fight, Mariel)	August 30, 2019	#DSPLabanMariel	5.0%	#1	

=== September 2019 ===
Episode		Original air date	Social media hashtag	AGB Nielsen NUTAM People in Television Homes		Ref.
Episode		Original air date	Social media hashtag	Rating	Timeslot rank	Ref.
76	"Sino Ka, Cedes?" (transl. Who Are You, Cedes?)	September 2, 2019	#DSPSinoKaCedes	5.6%	#2	
77	"Eldon's Karma"	September 3, 2019	#DSPEldonsKarma	5.2%	#2	
78	"Takas ng Batas" (transl. Escapee of Law)	September 4, 2019	#DSPTakasNgBatas	5.9%	#2	
79	"Fake Sister"	September 5, 2019	#DSPFakeSister	6.0%	#2	
80	"Pablo at Cedes" (transl. Pablo and Cedes)	September 6, 2019	#DSPPabloAtCedes	6.2%	#1	
81	"Takas, Portia" (transl. Escape, Portia)	September 9, 2019	#DSPTakasPortia	5.8%	#2	
82	"Ganti" (transl. Revenge)	September 10, 2019	#DSPGanti	6.0%	#2	
83	"Unhappy Reunion"	September 11, 2019	#DSPUnhappyReunion	5.8%	#2	
84	"Away Asawa" (transl. Spouse Fight)	September 12, 2019	#DSPAwayAsawa	5.6%	#2	
85	"Galit ni Mariel" (transl. Mariel's Anger)	September 13, 2019	#DSPGalitNiMariel	5.8%	#2	
86	"Annulment"	September 16, 2019	#DSPAnnulment	6.0%	#2	
87	"Pagsusumamo" (transl. Pleading)	September 17, 2019	#DSPPagsusumamo	5.9%	#2	
88	"Portia's Plan"	September 18, 2019	#DSPPortiasPlan	5.8%	#2	
89	"Double Cross"	September 19, 2019	#DSPDoubleCross	6.4%	#2	
90	"Pasabog" (transl. Explosion)	September 20, 2019	#DSPPasabog	5.9%	#2	
91	"Eldon's Plan"	September 23, 2019	#DSPEldonsPlan	5.5%	#2	
92	"Paasa" (transl. False Hope)	September 24, 2019	#DSPPaasa	6.3%	#1	
93	"Takas" (transl. Escape)	September 25, 2019	#DSPTakas	6.0%	#2	
94	"Resbak" (transl. Recluse)	September 26, 2019	#DSPResbak	6.0%	#2	
95	"Mariel vs. Portia"	September 27, 2019	#DSPMarielVsPortia	6.0%	#2	
96	"Bad Karma"	September 30, 2019	#DSPBadKarma	6.0%	#2	

=== October 2019 ===
Episode		Original air date	Social media hashtag	AGB Nielsen NUTAM People in Television Homes		Ref.
Episode		Original air date	Social media hashtag	Rating	Timeslot rank	Ref.
97	"Suspects"	October 1, 2019	#DSPSuspects	6.6%	#2	
98	"Rehas" (transl. Steel Bars)	October 2, 2019	#DSPRehas	6.0%	#2	
99	"Final Karma"	October 3, 2019	#DahilSaPagibig	6.0%	#2	
100	"Finale"	October 4, 2019	#DSPFinale	6.9%	#2	
