= Daddy's Gurl =

Philippine television sitcom series

- Title card from 2021 to 2023
- Genre: Sitcom
- Written by: Chris Martinez; Tina Samson-Velasco; John Lapus
- Directed by: Chris Martinez
- Starring: Vic Sotto; Maine Mendoza
- Country of origin: Philippines
- Original language: Tagalog
- No. of episodes: 175

Production
- Executive producer: Aila R. de Jesus
- Producers: Marvic C. Sotto; Antonio P. Tuviera
- Production location: Philippines
- Editor: Vanessa de Leon
- Camera setup: Multiple-camera setup
- Running time: 20–35 minutes
- Production companies: GMA Entertainment Group; M-Zet Productions

Original release
- Network: GMA Network
- Release: October 13, 2018 – May 6, 2023

Daddy's Gurl is a Philippine television sitcom series broadcast by GMA Network. Directed by Chris Martinez, it stars Vic Sotto and Maine Mendoza in the title role. It premiered on October 13, 2018 on the network's Sabado Star Power sa Gabi line up. The series concluded on May 6, 2023, with a total of 175 episodes.

== Premise ==
After the passing of Barak's wife, he decides to live in the condominium unit in Manila of his aspiring city girl daughter, Visitacion, in order to watch and take care of her, much to his daughter's surprise. He barely made a living for them, while he talks to the picture of his wife.

== Cast and characters ==
Cast

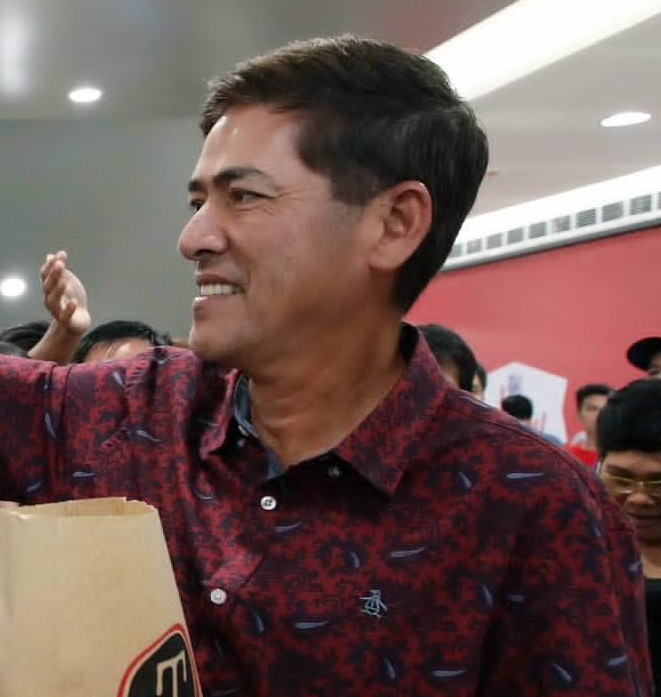
Vic Sotto

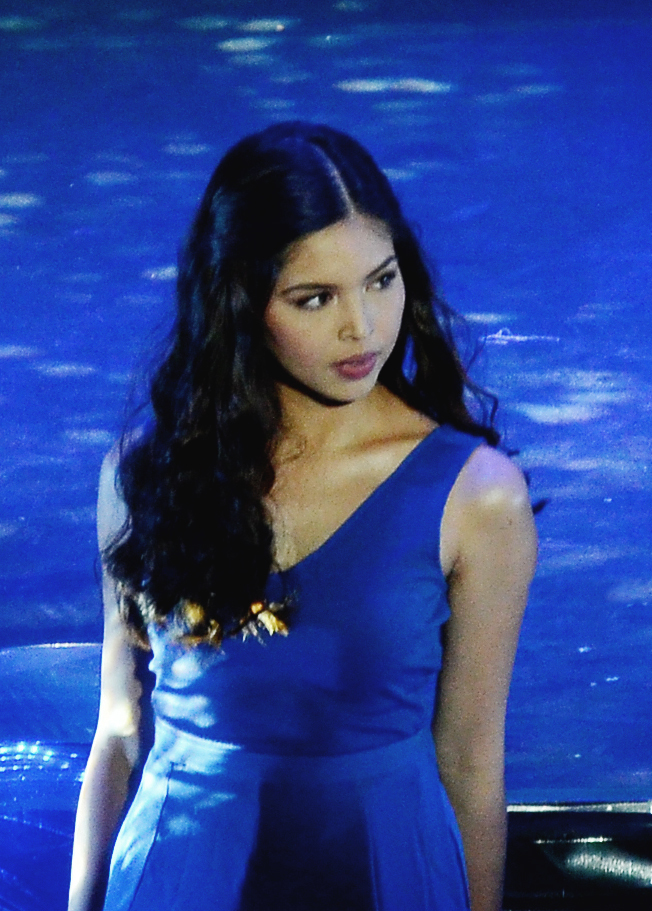
Maine Mendoza

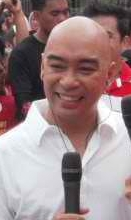
Wally Bayola

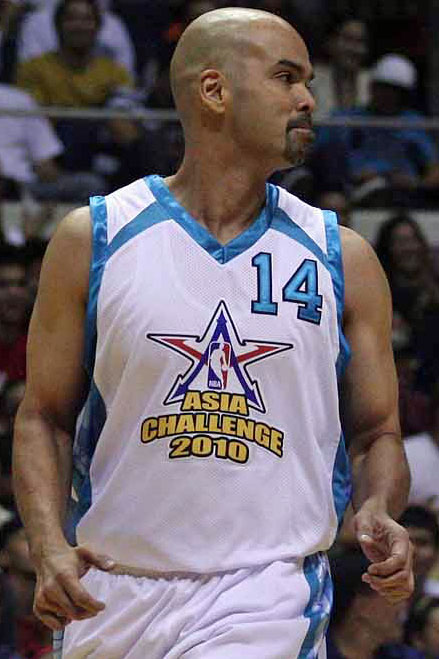
Benjie Paras

Lead cast

- Vic Sotto as Barak Otogan
- Maine Mendoza as Visitacion "Stacy" Otogan

Supporting cast

- Wally Bayola as Marikit Otogan / Matilda
- Angelika Dela Cruz as Oprah Saavedra
- Oyo Boy Sotto as Lance Saavedra
- Benjie Paras as Tom
- Kevin Santos as Daboy
- Jelson Bay as Jerry
- Chichirita as Beauty
- Chamyto as himself

Guest cast

- Odette Khan as Espi Rito
- Joey Marquez as Jun
- Jak Roberto as Jonas
- Kiko Estrada as Boji
- Martin del Rosario as Romualdo "Waldo" Saavedra
- Max Collins as May Amoy
- Rodjun Cruz as Bomber
- Tuesday Vargas as Hannah Silva
- Lovi Poe as Yammy
- Glydel Mercado as Fely
- Ruffa Gutierrez as Ruffa Mae Mendoza
- Ai-Ai delas Alas as Amor Flowers
- Kendoll as Jonnaly
- Andre Paras as Burnok Onse
- Megan Young as Kim
- Mikael Daez as Kanny
- Ruru Madrid as Anton
- Barbie Forteza as Pureza
- Jason Francisco as Kevin
- Leo Martinez as Rudy
- Leah Patricio as Anna
- Kyline Alcantara as Elsa dela Cruz / Daisy
- Kakai Bautista as Tootsie
- Alden Richards as Aldrich Reyes
- Janine Gutierrez as Mina
- Alma Moreno as Vanessa
- Winwyn Marquez as Therese
- Paolo Ballesteros as Pabling / Maruya Carey
- Sanya Lopez as Cherry Aguinaldo
- Clint Bondad as Onak
- Boobsie Wonderland as Abat
- Pilita Corrales as Oprah
- Jackie Lou Blanco as Becky Belat
- Ex Battalion as themselves
- Jo Berry as Tiny
- Solenn Heussaff as Margaux Lu
- Mika dela Cruz as Hillary
- Paul Salas as Brix
- Ken Chan as Kuracho
- Baste Benedict as Chukoy
- Glaiza de Castro as Grace
- Roi Vinzon as Brusko
- Sheena Halili as Berna
- Dante Gulapa as himself
- Gladys Reyes as Malou Manay
- Paolo Contis as Jumbo
- Sunshine Dizon as Demi Macaspac
- Thea Tolentino as Caitlyn
- Kristofer Martin as Hung Hang You
- André Paras as Burnok
- Kiray Celis as Sam
- Ed Caluag as himself
- Candy Pangilinan as Jujubi
- Danica Sotto as Lucille
- Joyce Ching as Claire
- Joey Paras as Tangerine
- Kristoffer Martin as Hung Hang Yoo
- Sophie Albert as Ella
- Super Tekla as Kiko Rukuko / Lala
- Yuan Francisco as Bon Jovi
- Sunshine Teodoro as Tingting
- Caprice Cayetano as Nosbi
- Joey Reyes as himself
- Buboy Villar as Champaca
- Carlo Aquino as Marco
- Wendell Ramos as Igme
- Jason Abalos as Rudolph
- Anjo Damiles as Ipe
- Melanie Marquez as Ms. Macupad
- Via Antonio as Jingle Belle
- Boi Spencer as himself
- Ryzza Mae Dizon as Chacha
- Ricky Davao as Ceferino Escobar
- Derrick Monasterio as Pantaleon
- Ina Feleo as Blaire
- Danieca Arreglado "Teacher Dan" Goc-ong as Teacher Diva
- Rufa Mae Quinto as Joy Dibdiban
- Cherie Gil as Cherry Hills
- Mavy Legaspi as Paul
- Boy 2 Quizon as Abdulaziz "Abdul" Alhambra
- Bianca Umali as Hazel
- Mark Bautista as Blitzen
- Kelvin Miranda as Jose Mari
- Lianne Valentin as Baby
- Bea Binene as Aiza
- Shamaine Buencamino as Celia
- Betong Sumaya as Mr. Cruise
- Nikki Co as Ken
- Archie Alemania as Jake
- Miggs Cuaderno as Kokoy
- Boobay as Kuya Jude
- Dustin Yu as Dustin
- Kimson Tan as Kimson
- Jenine Desiderio as Marilou
- Kokoy de Santos as Eskupido
- Wilma Doesnt as Veronique
- Matet de Leon as Sharon
- Gabby Eigenmann as Ramil
- Boboy Garrovillo as Hermano Balatibat

== Production ==
Principal photography was halted in March 2020 due to the enhanced community quarantine in Luzon caused by the COVID-19 pandemic. The series resumed its programming on June 13, 2020. In October 2021, John Lapus joined the series as a writer.

== Ratings ==
According to AGB Nielsen Philippines' Nationwide Urban Television Audience Measurement People in television homes, the pilot episode of Daddy's Gurl earned a 13.6% rating.

== Accolades ==
Accolades received by Daddy's Gurl
Year	Award	Category	Recipient	Result	Ref.
2019	7th Kagitingan Awards for Television ng Bataan Peninsula State University	Pinaka-magiting na Personalidad ng Comedy Show	Vic Sotto Maine Mendoza	Won	
2019	33rd PMPC Star Awards for Television	Best Comedy Program	Daddy's Gurl	Nominated	
2019	33rd PMPC Star Awards for Television	Best Comedy Actor	Vic Sotto	Nominated	
2019	33rd PMPC Star Awards for Television	Best Comedy Actress	Maine Mendoza	Won	
2021	34th PMPC Star Awards for Television	Best Comedy Actor	Vic Sotto	Won	
2021	34th PMPC Star Awards for Television	Best Comedy Actress	Maine Mendoza	Nominated	
2021	34th PMPC Star Awards for Television	Best Comedy Show	Daddy's Gurl	Nominated	
2023	35th PMPC Star Awards for Television	Best Comedy Actor	Vic Sotto	Nominated	
2023	35th PMPC Star Awards for Television	Best Comedy Show	Daddy's Gurl	Nominated	
