= Dante Gulapa =

Filipino internet celebrity

- Born: Dante Santos Gulapa; January 20, 1980 (age 46); Malabon, Philippines
- Other names: Big Papa, Big Daddy, King Eagle
- Occupation: Dancer

Dante Santos Gulapa (born January 20, 1980) is a Filipino internet and television personality known for his viral "macho dance" videos posted online on Facebook in 2019. He was nicknamed the "Big Papa" or "King Eagle" by his fan base "Gulapanatics" or "Daigonatics" for his signature dance move.

== Personal life ==
Gulapa was raised by his grandparents as a child. When he was old enough, he visited night bars and started performing as a bar dancer. According to him, his struggle with financial issues pushed him to pursue erotic dancing.

He also took different jobs aside from being a performer. He earned the moniker "Master Daigo" from Lightning Legend: Daigo no Daibouken on PlayStation. The DJ at the bar where he worked dubbed him "Master Daigo" for his excellence at performing and showmanship.

== Filmography ==
=== Television ===
Television
Year	Show	Role	Network
2019	Minute to Win It (Philippines)	Himself	ABS-CBN
2019	The Boobay and Tekla Show	Guest	GMA Network
2019	Studio 7	Guest	GMA Network
2019	Daddy's Gurl	Himself	GMA Network
2019	Magpakailanman: Viral Macho Dancer (The Dante Gulapa Story)	Himself	GMA Network
2019	Kapuso Mo, Jessica Soho	Himself	GMA Network
