= Dahil sa Pag-ibig (2019 TV series) =

2019 Philippine television drama series

- Title card
- Also known as: For Love or Money
- Genre: Crime drama
- Created by: Angeli Delgado
- Written by: Christine Novicio; Marlon Miguel; Wiro Michael Ladera; Angeli Delgado; Nehemiarey Dallego
- Directed by: Ricky Davao
- Creative director: Aloy Adlawan
- Starring: Sanya Lopez
- Theme music composer: Ann Margaret Figueroa
- Opening theme: "Ililigtas Kita" by Mirriam Manalo
- Country of origin: Philippines
- Original language: Tagalog
- No. of episodes: 100 (list of episodes)

Production
- Executive producer: Arlene del Rosario-Pilapil
- Editors: Nikka Olayvar-Layson; Julius Castillo; Kent Harvy dela Cruz; Ella Cruz; James Li
- Camera setup: Multiple-camera setup
- Running time: 22–32 minutes
- Production company: GMA Entertainment Group

Original release
- Network: GMA Network
- Release: May 20 – October 4, 2019

Dahil sa Pag-ibig (transl. because of love / international title: For Love or Money) is a 2019 Philippine television drama crime series broadcast by GMA Network. Directed by Ricky Davao, it stars Sanya Lopez. It premiered on May 20, 2019 on the network's Afternoon Prime line up. The series concluded on October 4, 2019, with a total of 100 episodes.

The series is originally titled as Blood Money. The series is streaming online on YouTube.

== Premise ==
Eldon Corpuz, an overseas Filipino worker in Saudi Arabia commits a crime that will land him in jail. His wife Mariel Corpuz, who lives in the Philippines is desperate to earn blood money for the bail of her husband. Portia Reyes, the wife of Eldon's employer, is bent on putting Eldon in jail. While Mariel's former lover Gary Sandoval, offers an indecent proposal to Mariel.

== Cast and characters ==
Cast

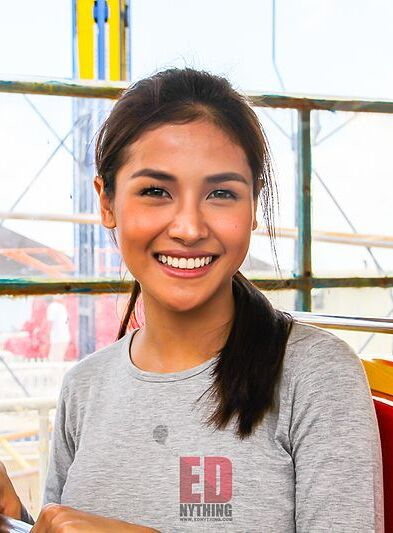
Sanya Lopez

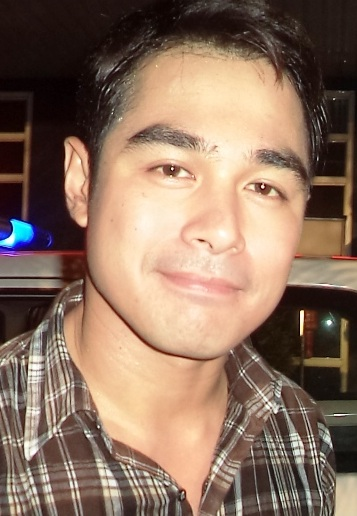
Benjamin Alves

Lead cast

- Sanya Lopez as Mariel Fajardo Corpuz

Supporting cast

- Benjamin Alves as Eldon Corpuz
- Winwyn Marquez as Portia Reyes Kahlaf
- Pancho Magno as Gary Sandoval
- Dominic Roco as Roger
- Devon Seron as Chin-Chin Fajardo
- Kelley Day as Alison
- Tetchie Agbayani as Clara Corpuz
- Rez Cortez as Pablo "Pabs" Sandoval
- Sandy Andolong as Nanette Fajardo

Guest cast

- Lianne Valentin as Madie Fajardo
- Charles Jacob Briz as Jun Jun Fajardo
- Teptep Mendoza as Justine F. Corpuz
- Rich Asuncion as Janet
- Janna Trias as Diding
- Arrian Labios as Goon
- Bernard Laxa as Goon
- Mark Malana as Police
- Sheen Gener as Inmate
- Jhoana Marie Tan as Cindy
- Catherine Remperas as Evie
- Jackie Rice as Mercedes Reyes / Mylene Buenaventura
- Jeff Carpio as Tomas

== Casting ==
Actor Rocco Nacino was initially hired to appear in the series as Eldon Corpus. Nacino was later removed from the show by GMA Network, and hired to appear in the drama series Descendants of the Sun: The Philippine Adaptation. Actor Benjamin Alves served as his replacement.

== Ratings ==
According to AGB Nielsen Philippines' Nationwide Urban Television Audience Measurement People in television homes, the pilot episode of Dahil sa Pag-ibig earned a 5.2% rating.

== Accolades ==
Accolades received by Dahil sa Pag-ibig
Year	Award	Category	Recipient	Result	Ref.
2021	34th PMPC Star Awards for Television	Best Daytime Drama Series	Dahil sa Pag-ibig	Nominated	
