= Joaquin Domagoso =

Filipino actor, model, and politician (born 2001)

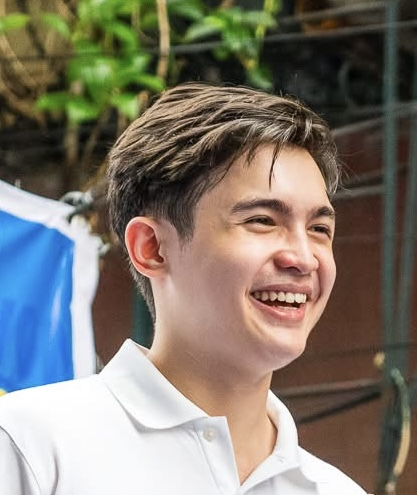
- Domagoso in 2024

Member of the Manila City Council from the 1st district
- Incumbent
- Assumed office June 30, 2025

Personal details
- Born: Joaquin Andre Ditan Domagoso; October 24, 2001 (age 24) Paco, Manila, Philippines
- Party: Aksyon Demokratiko (2024–present)
- Height: 5 ft 10 in (178 cm)
- Domestic partner: Raffa Castro
- Children: 1
- Parents: Isko Moreno (father); Diana Lynn Ditan (mother)
- Education: Southville International School affiliated with Foreign Universities
- Occupation: Actor; model; host
- Years active: 2019–present
- Agent: Sparkle GMA Artist Center (2019–present)

Joaquin Andre Ditan Domagoso (born October 24, 2001) is a Filipino actor, host, model and politician who is currently an artist under GMA Network and a 1st district councilor of Manila since 2025. He is the son of actor-politician and Manila mayor Isko Moreno.

== Early life and education ==
Domagoso was born on October 24, 2001, to Manila 1st district councilor Francisco "Isko Moreno" Domagoso and Diana Lynn Ditan. He is one of the couple's five children and is their second biological child together. He is named after his paternal grandfather.

He finished senior high school and studied a business entrepreneurship degree at Southville International School affiliated with Foreign Universities.

== Acting career ==
In 2019, Domagoso signed a contract with GMA Artist Center (now Sparkle) and became a semi-regular cast of the defunct variety show Studio 7. He later became a mainstay in All-Out Sundays since 2020.

In 2021, Domagoso was paired with Cassy Legaspi in the romantic comedy series First Yaya and its continuation, First Lady.

On November 23, 2022, Domagoso won the Best Actor award for his performance in That Boy In The Dark, directed by Adolf Alix Jr., at the 16th Toronto Film and Script Awards in Toronto, Canada. On December 23, 2022, Domagoso received another award as Best Actor at the 2022 Five Continents International Film Festival (FCIFF), an online festival in Venezuela. On December 26, he also won the Best Actor award at the Boden International Film Festival (BIFF) 2022 of Sweden. On February 2, 2023, he was awarded the Best Youth Actor Award at the 2023 New York Independent Cinema Awards. Domagoso has been recognized as the "Iconic Young Actor Ace of the Year" and "Promising Young Actor of the Year" by the Global Iconic Aces Awards 2022, and the 2022 Philippine Faces of Success, respectively. On February 22, 2023, Domagoso received an "Ani ng Dangal" trophy by the National Commission for Culture and the Arts (NCCA) during an awarding ceremony in the 15th Ani ng Dangal Awards held at the Ceremonial Hall of Malacañang Palace for winning Best Actor awards in the aforementioned international film festivals.

In 2023, Domagoso and his father Isko Moreno, appeared in the action series Black Rider. In 2024, Domagoso appeared in the legal drama series Lilet Matias: Attorney-at-Law.

== Political career ==
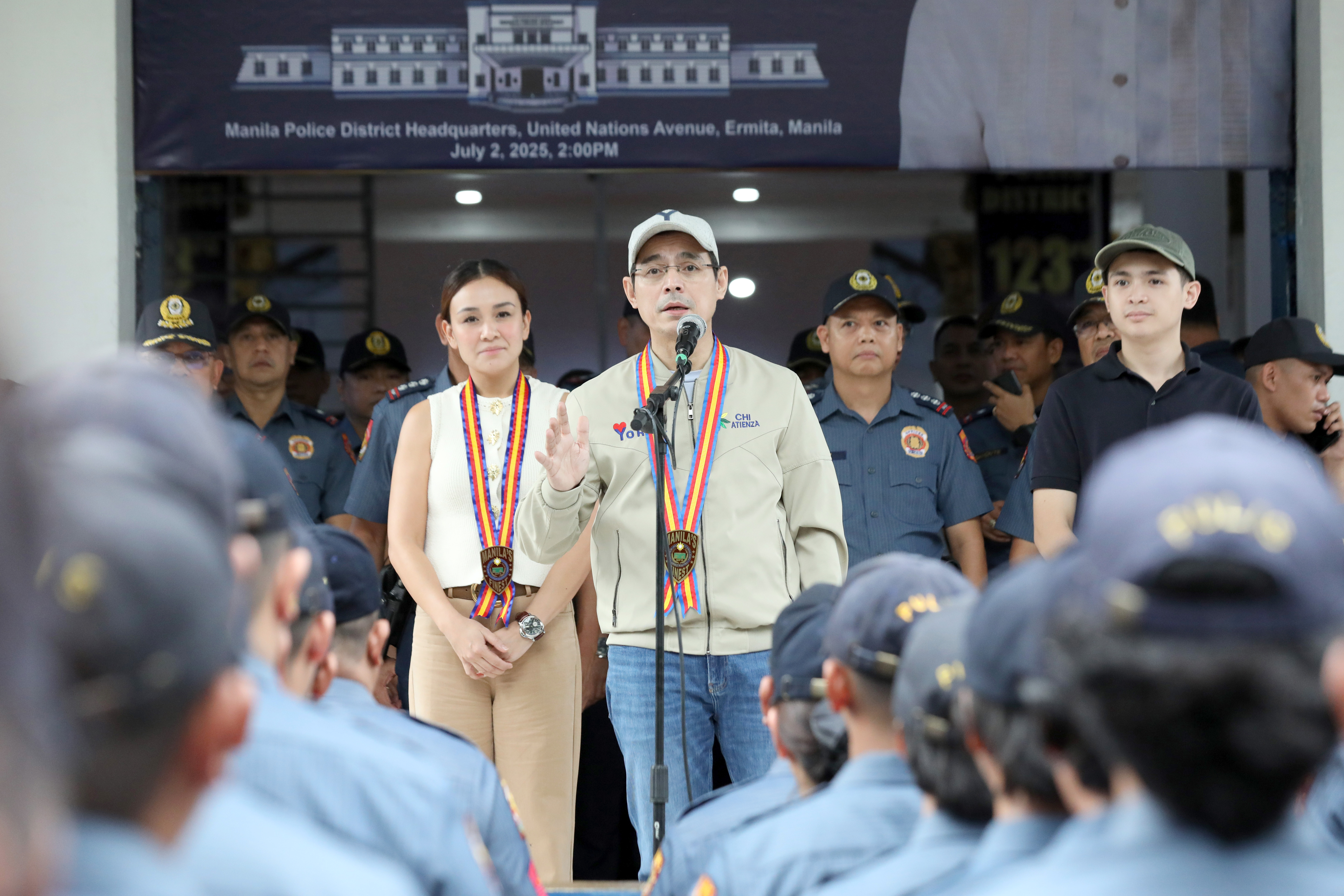
Domagoso (right) joins his father, Mayor Isko Moreno (center), as the latter addresses the Manila Police District at their headquarters in Ermita, Manila.

In 2024, it was announced that Domagoso joined Aksyon Demokratiko, the party led by his father, and would run for councilor of the first district of Manila in 2025. He later won, winning the most votes in the race.

== Personal life ==
Domagoso and social media personality girlfriend Raffa Castro, daughter of actor-turned-broadcast journalist Diego Castro and sister of actress Claire Castro, welcomed their son Scott Angelo on April 28, 2022, named after the childhood nickname of Domagoso's father Isko Moreno and Castro's late grandfather Angelo Castro Jr. The news was initially reported by Cristy Fermin and later confirmed by Philippine Entertainment Portal in late June 2022, two months after Castro gave birth. Domagoso was reportedly hands-on during Castro's pregnancy and kept the pregnancy private from the public eye during his father's campaign for the 2022 presidential elections, though Domagoso has never denied earlier rumors and had initially expressed intention to publicly reveal the identity of the child. Domagoso and Castro's relationship and parenthood are supported by their respective parents.

== Filmography ==
=== Film ===
Year	Title	Role	Ref.
2021	Huwag Kang Lalabas	Buboy	
2021	Caught in the Act	Barn Astete	
2023	That Boy in the Dark	Knight (lead role)	

=== Television ===
Year	Title	Role	Ref.
2019	Ipaglaban Mo!: Pariwala	Friend	
2019	Maynila: My Unwanted Son	Jom	
2019	Studio 7	Himself / Co-host	
2020–2023	All-Out Sundays	Himself / Performer	
2021	First Yaya	Jonas Clarito	
2021	Flex	Himself / Host	
2021	Daig Kayo Ng Lola Ko: Scarecation	Eloy	
2022	First Lady	Jonas Clarito	
2022	Magpakailanman: Huwag Kang Susuko	Niño Garcia	
2023	Daig Kayo Ng Lola Ko: Lodi League	Jig	
2023	Wish Ko Lang: Babae Po Ako	Douglas / Ahra	
2023	Black Rider	Lando	
2024	Lilet Matias: Attorney-at-Law	Constantino "Inno" de Leon Jr.	
2024	Magpakailanman: Don't Kill Your Baby	Dion Calzado	
