= Sanya Lopez =

Filipino actress (born 1996)

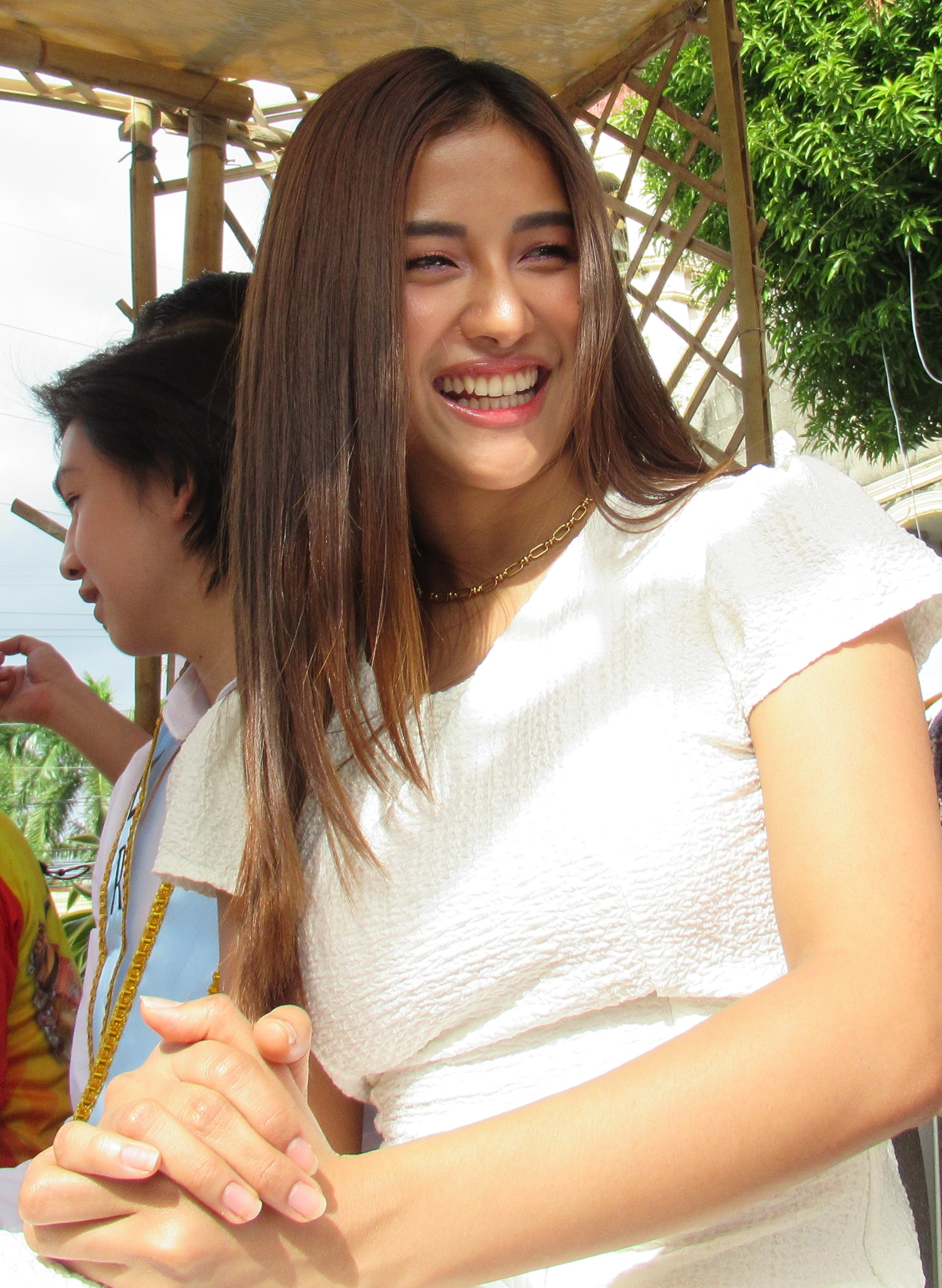
- Lopez in 2021
- Born: Shaira Lenn Osuna Roberto; August 9, 1996 (age 30); Malolos, Bulacan, Philippines
- Occupations: Actress; singer
- Years active: 2012–present
- Agents: German Moreno (2012–2015); Sparkle GMA Artist Center (2016–present)
- Relatives: Jak Roberto (brother)

YouTube information
- Channel: YouTube channel
- Years active: 2016–2023
- Subscribers: 1.43 million
- Views: 37.94 million
- Last updated: May 15, 2026

Shaira Lenn Osuna Roberto (born August 9, 1996), known professionally as Sanya Lopez (Tagalog: [ˈsɐɲɐ ˈlɔpɛs]), is a Filipino actress, singer, and television personality known for her work in Philippine television dramas and fantasy series. She began her career as a co-host on Walang Tulugan with the Master Showman (2012) after being discovered by veteran host German Moreno. She later appeared in supporting and minor roles before gaining wider recognition in The Half Sisters (2014).

Lopez rose to prominence in 2016 after portraying Danaya in the remake of Encantadia, which became her breakthrough role and established her as one of GMA Network’s rising lead actresses. She later starred in television series such as Haplos (2017–2018), First Yaya (2021), Mga Lihim ni Urduja (2023), and Pulang Araw (2024). In addition to acting, she released the single "Hot Maria Clara" in 2022, which later gained viral popularity on social media.

== Early life and background ==
Shaira Lenn Osuna Roberto was born on August 9, 1996, and raised in Malolos, Bulacan. She is the daughter of Marlene Osuna Roberto and Ramil Roberto, who died when she was two years old. Lopez is the younger sister of actor Jak Roberto. At the age of 14, Roberto met German Moreno and came to see him as a father figure; she dedicates her performance both to Moreno and her father. She was given the name Sanya, of Indian origin, by her manager.

Lopez resides in Quezon City with her brother Jak.

== Career ==
=== 2012–2015: Early career ===
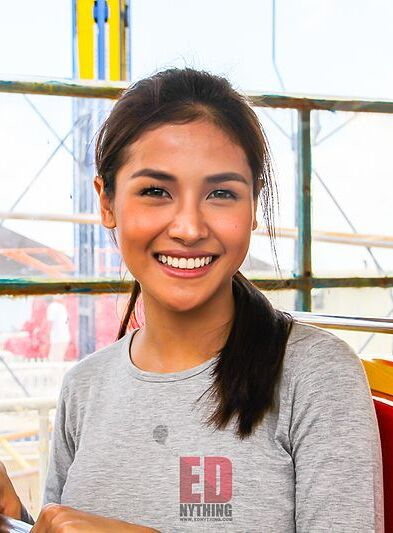
Lopez at the GMAAC Skyranch Date, April 2016

Lopez's entry into show business began when she visited the taping of Walang Tulugan with the Master Showman with her brother, Jak Roberto. During the visit, some fans mistook her for Kim Rodriguez, which caught the attention of veteran host German Moreno, also known as Moreno. After being introduced by Jak, Lopez was invited by Moreno to return for another taping, opening opportunities for her in the entertainment industry. Since then, Moreno included her on the program as one of his co-hosts.

Lopez began her acting career in 2012 through the teleserye Magdalena: Anghel sa Putikan, where she appeared in a challenging role at a young age. In the following years, she spent around four years doing minor and extra roles in various GMA Network's programs. During this period, she experienced humiliation and unfair treatment on set, including being forced out of tents during tapings and staying under the heat of the sun. Despite these hardships, she said the experiences taught her humility, perseverance, and respect for people regardless of status or profession.

=== 2016–2019: Breakthrough and transition to lead roles ===
In 2014, Lopez gained attention after appearing in The Half Sisters as the best friend of Barbie Forteza. Before The Half Sisters ended, she was offered a management contract by GMA Artist Center. Lopez's breakthrough came in 2016 when she was cast as Danaya in the remake of Encantadia, originally played by Bubble Gang former cast Diana Zubiri which she considers her biggest television break. She underwent five auditions and was initially considered for several other characters before finally securing the role. Her casting received criticism because she was still a newcomer, but her performance eventually earned praise and made her one of the breakout stars of the series. Following the success of Encantadia, her career rapidly progressed, and she became widely recognized by viewers. Zubiri, on the other hand, congratulated Lopez for bagging the role on her Twitter account.

Even before Encantadia ended in 2017, Lopez was already chosen to headline the teleserye Haplos. She later starred in Cain at Abel in 2018 alongside Dingdong Dantes and Dennis Trillo, whom she admired for their professionalism and humility. In 2019, she continued her rise as a lead actress through Dahil sa Pag-ibig.

In October 2019, Lopez was chosen as the 2020 calendar girl for the liquor brand Ginebra.

=== 2020–present: Career resurgence ===
In October 2020, Lopez was announced to portray Melody Reyes in First Yaya, replacing Marian Rivera, who exited the project due to concerns over lock-in taping. In 2021, she was cast as the leading lady in Agimat ng Agila, opposite Bong Revilla. Both series aired in 2021 and contributed significantly to her rise in popularity. Due to their success, both shows were renewed for a second season in 2022. Her character in Agimat ng Agila was written off to accommodate her commitment to the second season of First Yaya, retitled First Lady.

On July 15, 2022, Lopez released her debut single "Hot Maria Clara" under GMA Music along with its music video. In 2023, she portrayed the legendary warrior Urduja in the television series Mga Lihim ni Urduja, alongside her fellow Encantadia co-stars Kylie Padilla and Gabbi Garcia. The following year, in 2024, she played Teresita Borromeo, also known as "Morena," in the historical drama Pulang Araw.

In 2025, Lopez reprised her role as Danaya in Encantadia Chronicles: Sang'gre, a spin-off of the fantasy series Encantadia. On June 10, 2025, almost three years after its release, her single "Hot Maria Clara" appeared on top of Spotify's "Viral 50 Philippines Chart" after being featured on viral videos on social media.

== Personal life ==
During the media conference for Samahan ng mga Makasalanan on March 27, 2025, Lopez confirmed that she was dating a Chinese businessman. She said they were still in the dating stage and were enjoying each other's company without pressure. Lopez also shared that she now viewed relationships more seriously compared to before, when she was more focused on her career. She described the businessman as sincere and consistent in pursuing her, adding that she still preferred traditional courtship and hoped to find a caring and serious partner.

== Filmography ==
=== Film ===
Year	Title	Role(s)	Ref.
2017	Amalanhig: The Vampire Chronicles	Aryana Dimalinlang	
2018	Wild and Free	Ellie	
2020	Isa Pang Bahaghari	Dolores "Dolly / Dolly Ariana" Sanchez	
2024	Playtime	Allyson	
2025	Samahan ng mga Makasalanan	Mila	
2026	Midnight Girls	Mary Anne "Paris" Garcia Sibal	

=== Television ===
Year	Title	Role	Ref.
2013	Dormitoryo	Thea	
2014–2016	The Half Sisters	Lorna	
2016	The Millionaire's Wife	Lovely	
2016–2017	Encantadia	Sang'gre / Hara Danaya	
2017–2018	Haplos	Angela Marie Alonzo-Cortez / Angela Marie Alonzo-Montecines / Anj / Angel / Elang / Exotica / Alice	
2018–2019	Cain at Abel	Margaret Tolentino	
2019	Dahil sa Pag-Ibig	Mariella "Mariel" Fajardo-Corpuz	
2019	Beautiful Justice	Thea Vasquez	
2021	First Yaya	Melody Reyes-Acosta	
2021–2022	Agimat ng Agila	Maya Lagman	
2022	First Lady	Melody Reyes-Acosta	
2023	Mga Lihim ni Urduja	Hara Urduja	
2024	Pulang Araw	Teresita "Morena" Borromeo	
2025–2026	Encantadia Chronicles: Sang'gre	Sang'gre / Hara Durie Danaya	
2026	Born to Shine	Melody Reyes-Acosta	

=== Television (guest) ===
Year	Title	Role	Ref.
2012–2016	Walang Tulugan with the Master Showman	Herself (co-host)	
2016	Magpakailanman: "The Wowowin Grand Winner"	Shayne	
2017	Follow Your Heart	Herself	
2017	Karelasyon	Various roles	
2017	Imbestigador	Marina	
2017	Wish Ko Lang	RJ	
2017	Wowowin	Herself	
2017	Road Trip: Albay	Herself	
2017	Pepito Manaloto	Suzanne	
2017	Magpakailanman: "BFF: Best Sisters Forever"	Arianne	
2017	Tadhana: "Prodigal Daughter"	Elaine	
2018	Wagas: "Lola Iska, 120"	Teen Iska	
2018	Daig Kayo ng Lola Ko: "Giselle, Palayain Mo si Rapunzel!"	Rapunzel	
2018	Wish Ko Lang: "Ang Bangungot ni Rhea"	Rhea	
2018	Wagas: "Sigaw ng Puso (The Rein Morales and RJ Zulueta Story)"	Rein Morales	
2018	Inday Will Always Love You	Lea	
2018	Dear Uge: "Emma Liar"	Emma	
2018	Wish Ko Lang: "Tatlong Ama, Iisang Kapalaran"	Emily	
2018	Daig Kayo ng Lola Ko: "Witchikels"	Willow	
2018	Victor Magtanggol	Sang'gre Danaya / Aya	
2018	Studio 7	Herself	
2018	Wish Ko Lang: "Mga Mukha ng Pag-asa"	Herself / Emily	
2019	Tadhana: "Titser Yaya"	Elaine	
2019	Magpakailanman: "Tatlong Henerasyon ng Sipag at Tiyaga"	Young Lelang	
2019	Dear Uge: "Patayin sa Sindak si Bernadette"	Bernadette	
2019	Daddy's Gurl	Cherry Aguinaldo	
2019	Tadhana: "Boso"	Arianne	
2019	Imbestigador: "Gomez-Sarmenta Rape-Slay and Murder Case"	Eileen Sarmenta	
2019	Magpakailanman: "Babaeng Binulag ng Pag-ibig"	Leny	
2019	Beautiful Justice	Agent Thea	
2020	Daig Kayo ng Lola Ko: "Mermaid for Each Other"	Sofia	
2020	Tadhana: "Inner Beauty"	Elaine	
2020	Tadhana: "Laman"	Risa	
2020	Magpakailanman: "Halimaw sa Kama"	Mayet	
2021	Daig Kayo ng Lola Ko: "Oh My Oppa!"	Grace	
2021	Regal Studio Presents: "That Thin Line Between"	Gemma Rose	
2022	Daig Kayo ng Lola Ko: "Madal-Dolls"	Bubbles	
2022	Magpakailanman: "My Kidney Belongs to You"	Irish	
2022	Regal Studio Presents: "Budol Queen"	Rhea	
2022	Magpakailanman: "Listen to My Heart: The Maegan Aguilar Story"	Maegan Aguilar	
2022–2023	Daig Kayo ng Lola Ko: "All by My Elf"	Honey	
2023	Tadhana: "Nympha"	Nympha	
2023	Tadhana: "Pagtakas sa Kahapon"	Rowena	
2023	Magpakailanman: "A Runner to Remember: The Jirome de Castro Story"	Geraldine	
2023	Open 24/7	Herself	
2024	Walang Matigas na Pulis sa Matinik na Misis	Mildred Darlene Yabut	
2024–2025	It's Showtime	Herself (judge, performer)	
2025	Pinoy Big Brother: Celebrity Collab Edition	Herself	

== Awards ==
Year	Category	Work	Award Giving Body	Notes	Ref.
2016	Gintong Kabataan Sa Larangan ng Sining at Kultura recognition	—	Gintong Kabataan Awards	August 26, 2016	
2016	German Moreno Youth Achievement Award 2016	—	FAMAS Awards 2016	December 10, 2016	
2016	Huwarang Artista ng Taon para sa mga Kabataan	—	3rd Inding-Indie Short Film Festival Awards	December 4, 2016	
2017	Ranked No. 20, FHM Philippines 100 Sexiest Woman	—	FHM Philippines (Summit Media)	First time to be nominated in the list, July 2017 issue	
2019	New Movie Actress of the Year	Wild and Free	35th PMPC Star Awards for Movies	June 16, 2019	
2021	Best Supporting Actress	Isa Pang Bahaghari	4th EDDYS Entertainment Editors' Choice	Nominee	
2021	Top Celebrity Award	—	First TikTok Awards Philippines 2021	July 4, 2021	
