= Kazel Kinouchi =

Filipina-Japanese actress (born 1991)

- Born: Kazel Yllarie Kim Kinouchi; August 13, 1991 (age 35); Tokyo, Japan
- Occupation: Actress
- Years active: 2010–present
- Agent(s): Star Magic (2010–2021); Sparkle GMA Artist Center (2022–present)
- Known for: Miley Santiago in Oh My G! Zoey Tanyag in Abot-Kamay na Pangarap; Betsy Morales in My Father's Wife

Kazel Yllarie Kim Kinouchi (born August 13, 1991), is a Filipino-Japanese actress. She is also known as Zoey Tanyag in Abot-Kamay na Pangarap and the lead villain Betsy Morales in My Father's Wife.

== Early life and career ==
Kazel Yllarie Kim Kinouchi was born on August 13, 1991 in Tokyo, Japan.

She rose to fame after joining a televised hit reality show in Pinoy Big Brother in 2010.

In 2015, she played the role Miley Santiago via Oh My G!.

In 2022, she moved to GMA Network after 12 years with ABS-CBN. She appeared as Zoey Tanyag/Benitez via Abot-Kamay na Pangarap.

== Filmography ==
=== Television ===
Year	Title	Role	Notes
2010	Pinoy Big Brother	Herself/housemate	
2011	Good Vibes	Lea Carlos	Main Cast
2012	Paraiso	Rhoda	Recurring Cast
2012	Maalaala Mo Kaya	Consuelo	Episode: "Aso"
2013	Maalaala Mo Kaya	Roel's Sister	Episode: "Krus"
2014	Be Careful with My Heart	Georgina Barrel	Guest Cast
2014	Maalaala Mo Kaya	Carla	Episode: "Gitara"
2015	Oh My G!	Maria Luisa "Miley" Z. Santiago	Supporting Cast / Antagonist / Anti-Hero
2015	Pasión de Amor	Eliza "Elle" Adriano	Supporting Cast / Antagonist
2016	Maalaala Mo Kaya	Hermie	Episode: "Salamin"
2017	A Love to Last	Bianca Silverio	Guest Cast / Protagonist
2018	Maalaala Mo Kaya	Angelica	Episode: "Laptop"
2018	The End	Sam	
2018	Asintado	Young Hillary del Mundo	Special participation
2018	Playhouse	Olivia "Liv" Asuncion	Supporting Cast / Protagonist
2022	Start-Up PH	Catherine	
2022–2024	Abot-Kamay na Pangarap	Zoey R. Tanyag / Zoey R. Benitez	Main Cast / Antagonist / Anti-Hero
2022	Family Feud	Herself	Guest
2022	TiktoClock	Herself	Guest
2023	Fast Talk With Boy Abunda	Herself	Guest
2023	The Boobay and Tekla Show	Herself	Guest
2024	Sarap, 'Di Ba?	Herself	Guest
2025	My Ilonggo Girl	Joanna Pedroso	Guest Cast
2025	My Father's Wife	Elizabeth "Betsy" Morales-Rodriguez	Main Cast / Antagonist
2026	Sanggang Dikit FR	Rafaella “Ella”	Guest Cast / Protagonist
2026	You're My Favorite Song	Serina Dimaculangan- Montaverde	Supporting Cast / Antagonist
