= Hating Kapatid =

Hating Kapatid may refer to:

- Hating Kapatid (film), a 2010 Philippine film
- Hating Kapatid (TV series), a 2025 Philippine television drama series
