= Jillian Ward =

Filipino-American actress (born 2005)

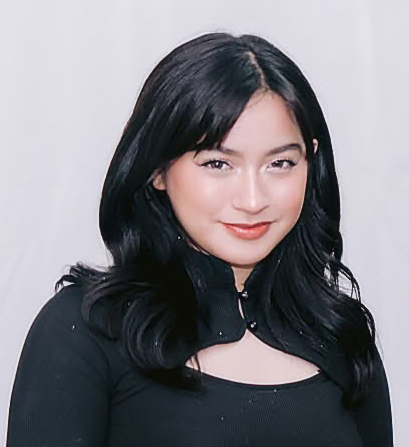
- Ward in July 2025
- Born: Jhyllianne Wardë; February 23, 2005 (age 21); Manila, Philippines
- Occupation: Actress
- Years active: 2009–present
- Agent: Sparkle GMA Artist Center
- Height: 5 ft 1 in (155 cm)
- Parents: Elson Penzon (father); Jennifer Ward-Penzon (mother)
- Musical career
- Genres: Pop
- Instrument: Vocals
- Label: GMA Music

Jhyllianne Wardë (English: /ˈdʒɪliːən wɑːrd/ JI-lee-yən WARD; Tagalog: [ˈdʒiljɐn wɐɹd]; born February 23, 2005) is a Filipino actress and singer. She began her career as a child actress, debuting in the drama comedy Trudis Liit. Her profile increased with leading roles in several daytime dramas, such as Prima Donnas and Abot-Kamay na Pangarap. Her accolades include a FAMAS Award, a Star Award for Movies, and two Box Office Entertainment Awards.

== Early life and education ==
Jhyllianne Wardë was born on February 23, 2005, in Manila, Philippines, to Elson Penzon and Filipino-American mother Jennifer Ward-Penzon. Her parents separated in 2024.

Ward finished pre-school in 2012 and attended elementary in 2011 at ODB Montessori School of Novaliches. She moved to Pampanga until 6th grade and attended junior high school as a homeschooling student at Westfields International School. She finished senior high school in 2023 at Homeschool of Asia Pacific in Muntinlupa.

== Career ==
She first appeared in a commercial for Promil Pre-school, a powdered milk drink. Before starring in GMA Network's TV remake of the classic film Trudis Liit, she had played the role of Daldanika in The Last Prince.

== Other activities ==
In November 2019, Ward founded her own business Wonder Tea Philippines in Floridablanca as its first branch. It was followed by Guagua, San Fernando, and Porac as their second, third, and fourth branches.

== Filmography ==
=== Film ===
Year	Title	Role	Notes	Ref.
2010	Si Agimat at Si Enteng Kabisote	Bebeng	Credited as "Gillian Ward"	
2011	My Valentine Girls	Lilly Perez / Ishi/Lily/Aidan and Ivy's daughter	Segment: "Soulmates", "BBF", "Gunaw"	
2011	Oh! Pa Ra Sa Ta Y Wa Yeah!	Bettina	Short film	
2011	Aswang	Ahnia		
2012	The Mommy Returns	Sapphire "Saf" Martirez	Supporting role	
2012	Si Agimat, si Enteng Kabisote at si Ako	Bebeng		
2025	KMJS' Gabi ng Lagim: The Movie	Angel	Segment: "Sanib"	

=== Television / Digital Series ===
Year	Title	Role
2010	The Last Prince	Daldakina
2010	Wachamakulit	Herself
2010	Maynila	Melanie
2010	Sine Novela: Trudis Liit	Gertrudis "Trudis" Capili-Ferrer
2010	Kaya ng Powers	Janna Jackson Powers
2010	Maynila	Sean
2010	Pepito Manaloto	Angelica
2010–11	Jillian: Namamasko Po	Jillian the Doll
2011	Captain Barbell	Leah "Lelay" Concepcion / Super Tiny
2011	Eat Bulaga!	Herself / Guest
2011	Andres de Saya	Jecjec
2011–12	Daldalita	Lolita Matias / Daldalita
2012	Biritera	Louise May Imperial
2012–14	Kap's Amazing Stories	Marikit
2012	Spooky Valentine	Princess
2012	Luna Blanca Book 1	Luna Sandoval / Luna de Jesus / Cara Amor Montecines
2012	Cielo de Angelina	Young Angelina
2013	Indio	Young Rosa
2013	Home Sweet Home	Jessie Caharian
2013	Magpakailanman: Kabang: Hero Dog	Dina
2013	One Day Isang Araw	Daisy
2013	Magkano Ba ang Pag-ibig?	Young Richelle
2013	Genesis	Young Racquel
2014	My BFF	Chelsea / Elsie
2015	Pari 'Koy	Sarah Espiritu Cruz
2015	Magpakailanman: Apoy ng Pangarap (The Beverly Grimaldo Story)	Young Bebs
2016	Poor Señorita	Charisse Dela Cruz
2016	Dear Uge: Maid in China	Tricia
2016–17	Sa Piling ni Nanay	Maya Salvacion-de Guzman / Katherine Mercado
2017	Maynila	Charlene Liantada
2017	Haplos	Teen Angela Marie
2017–19	Daig Kayo ng Lola Ko	Alice Espino / Princesita
2017–18	Super Ma'am	Michelle Ombrero
2018	Lip Sync Battle Philippines	Herself / Guest Performer
2018	Sunday PinaSaya	Herself / Guest Performer
2018	Dear Uge: Pasiklaban sa Lamayan	Julia
2018	Magpakailanman: Ang Batang Biktima ng Sanib	Julia
2018–19	My Special Tatay	Odette Villaroman
2019–22	Prima Donnas	Donna Marie "Mayi" Madreal Escalante
2019	Maynila	Sara
2020–22; 2023–25	All-Out Sundays	Herself / Guest Performer
2022	Daig Kayo ng Lola Ko: Tiki Toktok	Angelica "Angel" Andres
2022	Tadhana: Tayong Dalawa	Sophia
2022	Happy Together: Kalapati	Maye
2022–24	Abot-Kamay na Pangarap	Dra. Analyn Santos
2023	Royal Blood	Dra. Analyn Santos
2023	Daig Kayo ng Lola Ko: Captain Kitten	Captain Kitten / Kat
2024–present	It's Showtime	Herself / Guest
2024	Black Rider	Dra. Analyn Santos
2024	Walang Matigas na Pulis sa Matinik na Misis	Barbara (season 3)
2025	My Ilonggo Girl	Roberta "Tata" Magbanua / Venice Hermoso (before)
2025	Mga Batang Riles	Lady
2025	Bubble Gang	Amponietta
2025	Hating Kapatid	Dra. Analyn Tanyag-Young
2026	Never Say Die	Joey Delgado
2026	Pinoy Big Brother: Celebrity Collab Edition 2.0	Herself / Houseguest
TBA	Behind Close Doors	

== Discography ==
=== Singles ===
Title	Year	Album	Label	Ref.
"Tomorrow" (unreleased)	2010	Non-album single	—N/a	
"Natutulog Ba ang Diyos?"	2012	Cielo de Angelina OST	GMA Records	
"Best Friends Forever"	2014	Novela (album by Janno Gibbs)	GMA Records	
"Sa Piling ni Nanay"	2016	Mga Awit Mula sa Puso Vol. 7	GMA Records	
"Daig Kayo ng Lola Ko"	2017	Daig Kayo ng Lola Ko OST	GMA Records	
"Ikaw ang Tahanan Ko"	2019	Prima Donnas OST	GMA Music	
"Bukod Tangi"	2022	Prima Donnas OST	GMA Music	
"First Love Na Nga Ba"	2022	Prima Donnas OST	GMA Music	
"Kaibigan"	2022	Prima Donnas OST	GMA Music	
"Be All Mine"	2024	Non-album single	GMA Music	
"Soredemo (Kahit Na)" (with SkyGarden)	2024	Pulang Araw OST	GMA Music	
"Boom Bada Boom"	2025	My Ilonggo Girl OST	GMA Music	
"Lihim"	2025	My Ilonggo Girl OST	GMA Music	
"Pumapag-ibig"	2026	Non-album single	GMA Music	
"Lowkey"	2026	Non-album single	GMA Music	

=== Music video appearances ===
Title	Year	Artist(s)	Role	Album	Director	Ref.
"Shawty"	2022	Donnalyn	Herself	Non-album singles	Donnalyn	
"Maria Clara"	2022	Magnus Haven	Herself	Non-album singles	Albert S. Langitan	
"Tara, Laro"	2024	Various	Melissa	Non-album singles	Emerson Reyes	

== Accolades ==
Awards and nominations received by Jillian Ward
Award (Note: Awards, festivals, honors and other miscellaneous organizations are listed in alphabetical order.)	Year (Note: Indicates the year of ceremony. Each year is linked to the article about the awards held that year, wherever possible.)	Category	Nominated work	Result	Ref.
Asia Pacific Luminare Awards	2023	Most Remarkable Actress of the Year	Abot-Kamay na Pangarap	Won	
Box Office Entertainment Awards	2011	Most Popular Female Child Performer	Jillian Ward	Won	
Box Office Entertainment Awards	2024	Daytime TV Actress of the Year	Abot Kamay na Pangarap	Won	
FAMAS Awards	2011	Best Child Actress	Si Agimat at si Enteng Kabisote	Nominated	
FAMAS Awards	2023	German Moreno Youth Achievement Award	Jillian Ward	Won	
NSSU Students' Choice Awards for Radio and Television	2023	Best Actress in Daytime Series	Abot Kamay na Pangarap	Won	
Star Awards for Movies	2011	Movie Child Performer of the Year	Si Agimat at si Enteng Kabisote	Nominated	
Star Awards for Movies	2012	Movie Child Performer of the Year	Aswang	Won	
Star Awards for Television	2011	New Female TV Personality	Trudis Liit	Won	
Star Awards for Television	2012	Best Child Performer	Luna Blanca	Nominated	
Star Awards for Television	2013	Best Child Performer	Home Sweet Home	Nominated	
Star Awards for Television	2014	Best Child Performer	My BFF	Nominated	

== See also ==
- List of Filipino actresses
- Cinema of the Philippines
- Television in the Philippines
- List of former Filipino child actors
