= Analyn =

Analyn is a given name. Notable people with the name include:

- Analyn Barro (born 1996), Filipina actress
- Analyn Santos, fictional character from the Philippine medical drama series Abot-Kamay na Pangarap
