= Marikit =

2020 song by Juan Craoile and Kyle Caplis

Single by Juan Caoile & Kyle Caplis
- Released: May 21, 2020
- Recorded: 2020
- Genre: Pop
- Length: 4:19
- Label: VIVA Records
- Songwriter: Juan Caoile
- Producer: Since1999

Music video
- "Marikit" on YouTube

"Marikit" (English: Beautiful) is the debut song by Filipino hip hop artists Juan Caoile and Kyle Caplis. It was released on May 21, 2020 and produced by Since1999.

It is a pop record blend with a touch of rap. Produced by Since1999 and written by Juan Caoile, the song which does not only have an upbeat and addictive tone to the listener has also become an ode of appreciation to all women.

The song, which is in Tagalog, was initially written by Juan Caoile for his girlfriend, Elyn Sebastian in 2019, who he said inspired him. Caoile and childhood friend Kyle Caplis finally came up with a collaboration for "Marikit", combining different musical beats, hip-hop with the song in lyrical, old Tagalog tone. The song became a top trending hit globally, garnering 15 million views as of July 19 and hitting number one in the Top Hits Philippines on Spotify. It also had a staggering 250 million views on TikTok.

There have been many versions of the song, including the acoustic version released on July 24, 2020. A cover by Sparkle GMA Artist Center artist Sean Lucas was released in 2025 as the soundtrack for the drama series Binibining Marikit.

== Music video ==
The official music video was released and posted on YouTube on June 28, 2020. However, earlier versions had been released since May, including the lyrics video which hit 81 million views on YouTube. Denise Julia played one of the main love interests in the music video.
