= Jeff Moses =

Filipino actor (born 2000)

- Born: Jeff Moses Halaghay; April 1, 2000 (age 26); San Carlos City, Negros Occidental, Philippines
- Occupation: Actor
- Years active: 2022–present
- Agent: Sparkle

Jeff Moses Halaghay (born April 1, 2000) is a Filipino actor. He made his acting debut as Reagan in the medical drama series Abot-Kamay na Pangarap (international title: Hands on the Dream) in 2022. In 2024, he received attention from film and theater critics for his roles as Stephen, a young baker in 1980s Negros Occidental, in Under a Piaya Moon (2024); and as Topee in Bagets: The Musical (2026), a theater adaptation of the 1984 coming-of-age comedy film Bagets (lit. 'Teens'). In 2026, he was cast as Romer Pasion in Bongga Ka, 'Day!: The Annie Batungbakal Musical.

== Life and career ==
Jeff Moses Halaghay was born on April 1, 2000 in San Carlos City, Negros Occidental. Although his father is Ilonggo, and Moses speaks Hiligaynon, his first language is Cebuano. He was a member of the San Carlos Boys, a dance trio in his hometown that was popular with Visayan viewers on social media.

In 2022, Moses made his acting debut as hospital custodian Reagan in the medical drama series Abot-Kamay na Pangarap (international title: Hands on the Dream). In 2024, he starred as Stephen, a young baker who joins a baking competition in Negros Occidental to generate publicity for his business, in the independent Hiligaynon-language film Under a Piaya Moon. It premiered at the 2024 Puregold CinePanalo Film Festival, where Moses won the Best Actor award; his performance in Piaya Moon also earned a nomination for New Movie Actor of the Year at the 41st PMPC Star Awards for Movies. ABS-CBN Entertainment's Fred Hawson wrote that Moses's smile and demeanor in the film made the audience immediately root for his character.

In October 2025, Moses was cast as Topee in Bagets: The Musical, a theater adaptation of the coming-of-age comedy film Bagets (1984). He alternated the role with Sam Shoaf. Originally portrayed by J.C. Bonnin, the character is an Ilonggo martial arts enthusiast; in an interview with ABS-CBN News's Leah C. Salterio, Moses said that he felt confident in the role due to his own fluency in Hiligaynon and athletic background. The play opened on January 23, 2026 at the Newport World Resorts in Manila, directed by Maribel Legarda of the Philippine Educational Theater Association. Critics agreed that Moses's character was underdeveloped, but praised his performance; Daily Tribune's Alwin Ignacio described Moses as the cast's "most impressive" member alongside KD Estrada, while Spot.PH's Jerome Gomez commended his vocal abilities and for "invest[ing] his role with such electricity and verve". (Note: Attributed to multiple sources:)

In June 2026, Moses was cast as Romer Pasion in Bongga Ka, 'Day!: The Annie Batungbakal Musical, which is scheduled to begin its run at the Newport World Resorts in September this year. The character, which he shares with Sam Concepcion and Anthony Rosaldo, is a flirtatious and self-assured flight attendant and the heir of House of Pasion, a fictional fashion house.

== Public image ==
In December 2023, Mega included Moses in their list of standout rising actors they believed would have their breakthrough moments in the following year. In June 2024, Alwin Ignacio of the Daily Tribune identified Moses as a member of the Philippines' new generation of leading men, calling him "brown-skinned, photogenic,[...] and eager to try more out of the box and engaging characters".

== Filmography ==
Key
†	Denotes films that have not yet been released

=== Television ===
Year	Title	Role	Notes
2022–2024	Abot-Kamay na Pangarap	Reagan Tibayan	
2023	Pepito Manaloto: Tuloy Ang Kwento	Neil	Episode: "Juice Balls"
2024	Bubble Gang	Various	Episodes: "Misquotes" and "Medyo cool"
2025	Lilet Matias: Attorney-at-Law	Marco	Episode: "Matibay na ebidensya"
2025	Regal Studios Presents	JC/JM	Dual role; anthology series; episode: "Twin Takeover"
2025	Binibining Marikit	Caloy	
2025–2026	Hating Kapatid	Calix	
2026	Taskforce Firewall	Darryl	

=== Film ===
Year	Title	Role	Notes
2024	Under a Piaya Moon	Stephen Maravilla	Lead role

== Stage credits ==
Year	Title	Role	Director	Venue
2026	Bagets: The Musical	Topee	Maribel Legarda	Newport World Resorts, Manila
2026	Bongga Ka, 'Day!: The Annie Batungbakal Musical †	Romer Pasion	Chris Millado	Newport World Resorts, Manila
