= My Ilonggo Girl =

2025 Philippine television drama series

- Title card
- Genre: Drama; Romantic comedy
- Created by: John Mychal Feraren; Erwin Caezar Bravo
- Written by: Erwin Caezar Bravo
- Directed by: Conrado Delgago Peru
- Starring: Jillian Ward
- Country of origin: Philippines
- Original language: Tagalog
- No. of episodes: 40

Production
- Executive producers: Rochelle Ann F. Marcelo; Joseph Aleta; Karl Perry G. Laylo
- Producers: David Ramos; EJ dela Cruz; Ana Martha Zamora
- Production location: Iloilo
- Cinematography: Jay Ramirez
- Editors: Jhoan Q. Antenor-Longboy; Erdy M. Tibayan; Roslainy T. Barodi
- Camera setup: Multiple-camera setup
- Running time: 25–31 minutes
- Production company: GMA Public Affairs

Original release
- Network: GMA Network
- Release: January 13 – March 20, 2025

My Ilonggo Girl is a 2025 Philippine television drama romantic comedy series broadcast by GMA Network. Directed by Conrado Delgado Peru, it stars Jillian Ward in the title role. It premiered on January 13, 2025 on the network's Prime line up. The series concluded on March 20, 2025, with a total of 40 episodes.

The series is streaming online on YouTube.

== Premise ==
An Ilongga's life takes a turn as she navigates fame and identity, when she is forced to impersonate an internet celebrity.

== Cast and characters ==
Cast

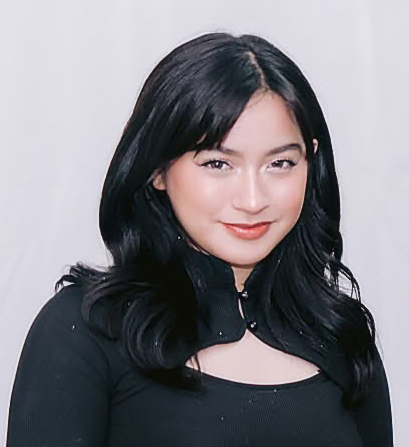
Jillian Ward

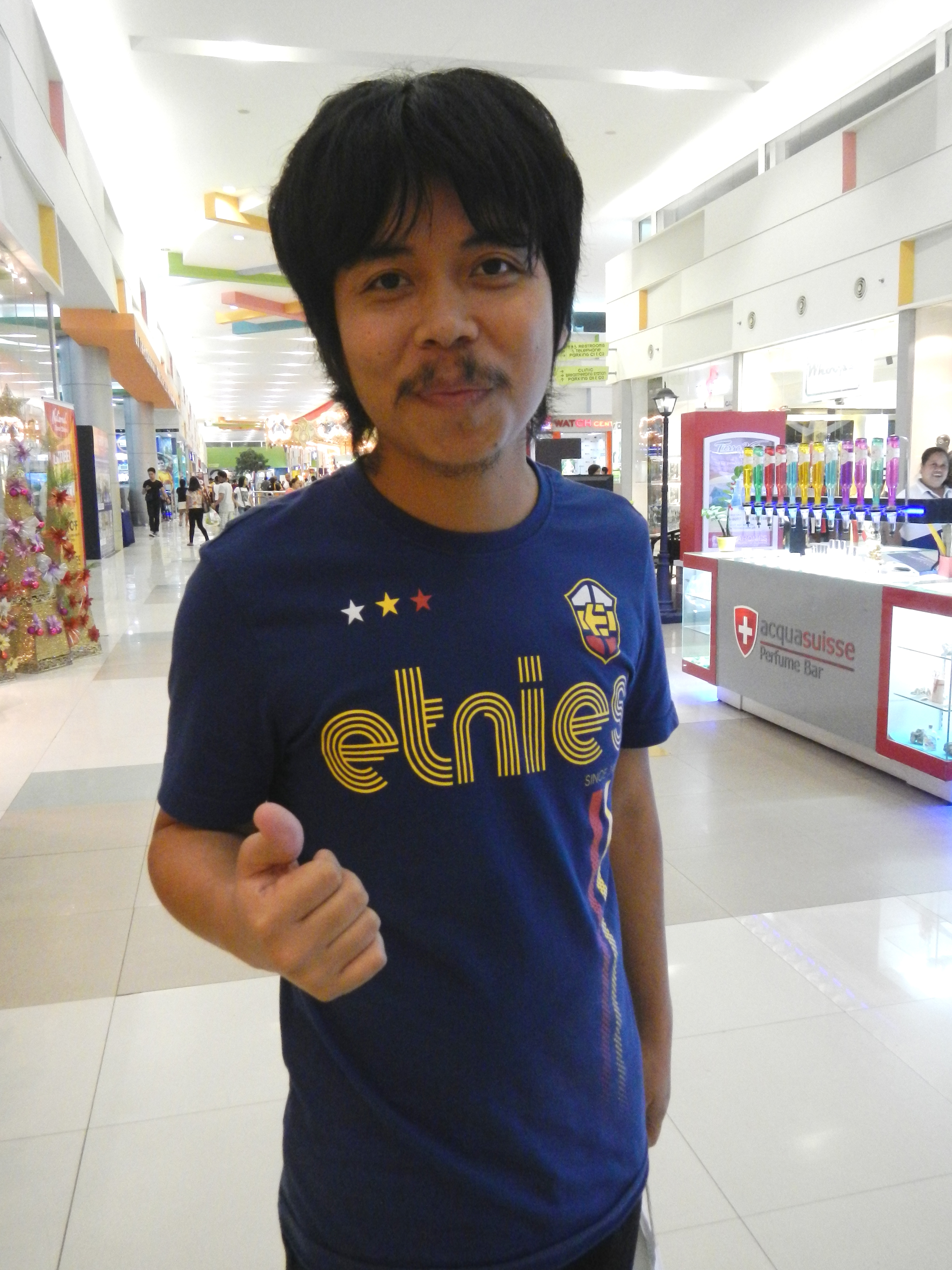
Empoy Marquez

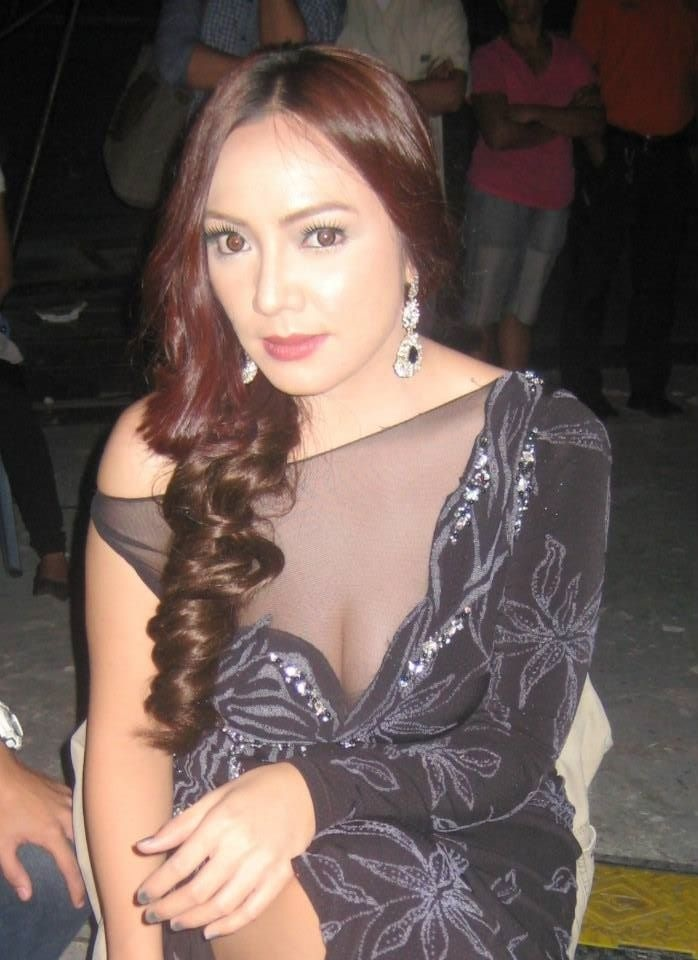
Shermaine Santiago

Lead cast

- Jillian Ward as Roberta "Tata" Magbanua, a "humble" Ilongga and Venice's doppelgänger / Venice Hermoso, a "glamorous" actress

Supporting cast

- Michael Sager as Francis Palma
- Arlene Muhlach as Shirley "Nay Gwapa" Magbanua
- Andrea del Rosario as Margaret Palma
- Empoy Marquez as Dante "Daboy" Galang
- Lianne Valentin as Ivana Velasquez
- Arra San Agustin as Sugar Hermoso
- Richard Quan as Gregorio Orlando-Vicente "Gov" Palma
- Teresa Loyzaga as Vivian Hermoso
- Yasser Marta as James Ramirez
- Vince Maristela as John Paul "Jampol" Pedroso
- Yesh Burce as Nora Velasquez
- Sebreenika Santos as Marian "Maymay" Pedroso
- Geo Mhanna as Julius Palma
- Aleck Bovick as Loring
- Carla Martinez as Dulce "Sweet" Palma
- Patricia Ismael as Vilma
- Raquel Pareño as Sharon
- Al Gatmaitan as Ninong
- Larkin Castor as Ryker Hermoso
- Gelly Bea Isorena as Daisy Vicente
- Myrtle Sarrosa as Venice Hermoso

Guest cast

- Kazel Kinouchi as Joanna Pedroso
- Shermaine Santiago as Sharmaine
- Matt Lozano as Vincent Palma

== Ratings ==
According to AGB Nielsen Philippines' Nationwide Urban Television Audience Measurement People in television homes, the pilot episode of My Ilonggo Girl earned a 6.2% rating. The final episode scored an 8% rating.
