= List of Abot-Kamay na Pangarap episodes =

Abot-Kamay na Pangarap is a Philippine television drama series broadcast by GMA Network. It premiered on September 5, 2022, on the network's Afternoon Prime and Sabado Star Power sa Hapon line up replacing Apoy sa Langit. The series concluded on October 19, 2024, with a total of 659 episodes. It was replaced by Lilet Matias: Attorney-at-Law in its timeslot.

== Series overview ==
Season	Episodes	Originally released	
Season	Episodes	First released	Last released
1	659	September 5, 2022	October 19, 2024

== Episodes ==
No.	Title	Original release date	AGB Nielsen Ratings NUTAM People
1	"World Premiere"	September 5, 2022	6.3%
2	"Pangarap" (transl. dream)	September 6, 2022	6.6%
3	"Pagtatagpo" (transl. meet up)	September 7, 2022	7.1%
4	"Ikaw Na Nga Ba, Dok Tanyag?" (transl. is it you, Dr. Tanyag?)	September 8, 2022	6.5%
5	"Yakap ng Ama" (transl. father's embrace)	September 9, 2022	6.7%
6	"School Opening"	September 12, 2022	6.9%
7	"Young Dream"	September 13, 2022	6.7%
8	"Batang Henyo" (transl. genius child)	September 14, 2022	7.0%
9	"Iskolar Ako!" (transl. i'm a scholar!)	September 15, 2022	7.8%
10	"High School Life"	September 16, 2022	7.5%
11	"Perfect Score"	September 17, 2022	6.6%
12	"Kasinungalingan" (transl. lie)	September 19, 2022	7.4%
13	"Student Lyneth"	September 20, 2022	8.0%
14	"Medical School"	September 21, 2022	7.7%
15	"Kodigo" (transl. cheat sheet)	September 22, 2022	7.7%
16	"The Truth"	September 23, 2022	7.7%
17	"Paghaharap" (transl. confrontation)	September 24, 2022	7.7%
18	"Doktor na Ako!" (transl. i'm finally a doctor!)	September 26, 2022	8.6%
19	"Bullies sa Hospital" (transl. bullies in the hospital)	September 27, 2022	7.4%
20	"Carwash"	September 28, 2022	7.7%
21	"Rite of Passage"	September 29, 2022	8.0%
22	"Pabibo at Pabida" (transl. know-it-all and show-off)	September 30, 2022	7.8%
23	"Best Gift"	October 1, 2022	8.4%
24	"Lyneth's Birthday"	October 3, 2022	7.8%
25	"Stalker Ka Ba?" (transl. are you a stalker?)	October 4, 2022	7.2%
26	"Party"	October 5, 2022	8.4%
27	"Ako ang Ama" (transl. i'm the father)	October 6, 2022	7.5%
28	"Paboritong Pagkain" (transl. favorite food)	October 7, 2022	8.7%
29	"New Medical Director"	October 8, 2022	7.9%
30	"Masyadong Pabida" (transl. too egoistic)	October 10, 2022	7.9%
31	"Hanapin si Tatay" (transl. find father)	October 11, 2022	8.2%
32	"Buhay ng Pasyente" (transl. life of a patient)	October 12, 2022	8.5%
33	"As One Family"	October 13, 2022	8.1%
34	"Wafer Stick"	October 14, 2022	9.2%
35	"Telling the Truth"	October 15, 2022	9.2%
36	"The Kiss"	October 17, 2022	8.3%
37	"Crush"	October 18, 2022	9.1%
38	"Sino si Tisay?" (transl. who is Tisay?)	October 19, 2022	9.0%
39	"Hinala" (transl. suspicion)	October 20, 2022	9.3%
40	"Sikreto ni Chinito" (transl. Chinito's secret)	October 21, 2022	9.4%
41	"Mag-ina" (transl. mother and daughter)	October 22, 2022	8.6%
42	"Hindi Totoo" (transl. not true)	October 24, 2022	N/A
43	"DNA Test"	October 25, 2022	10.1%
44	"Resignation"	October 26, 2022	9.5%
45	"Farewell Party"	October 27, 2022	9.7%
46	"Bintang" (transl. accusation)	October 28, 2022	11.1%
47	"Allergy"	October 29, 2022	9.9%
48	"The Deal"	October 31, 2022	10.2%
49	"Zoey Strikes Again"	November 1, 2022	8.6%
50	"Buong Pamilya" (transl. whole family)	November 2, 2022	9.3%
51	"Hanapin si Tisay" (transl. find Tisay)	November 3, 2022	9.5%
52	"Confession"	November 4, 2022	9.1%
53	"Magkapatid" (transl. siblings)	November 5, 2022	8.6%
54	"The Proposal"	November 7, 2022	N/A
55	"Aling Susan"	November 8, 2022	N/A
56	"We Are Not Sisters"	November 9, 2022	9.0%
57	"Turo ni Lyneth" (transl. Lyneth's instruction)	November 10, 2022	N/A
58	"Pagtanggap" (transl. acceptance)	November 11, 2022	8.9%
59	"Maging Ina" (transl. be a mother)	November 12, 2022	8.7%
60	"Pagtatanggol" (transl. defense)	November 14, 2022	8.9%
61	"Pangarap ni Zoey" (transl. Zoey's dream)	November 15, 2022	N/A
62	"Pagiging Tatay" (transl. becoming a father)	November 16, 2022	8.6%
63	"Like a Father"	November 17, 2022	N/A
64	"Bintang" (transl. accusation)	November 18, 2022	9.5%
65	"Zoey is Back"	November 19, 2022	N/A
66	"Ganda Lang" (transl. only beauty)	November 21, 2022	8.2%
67	"Rehearsal"	November 22, 2022	8.5%
68	"Saving Life"	November 23, 2022	N/A
69	"Pageant Night"	November 24, 2022	8.3%
70	"Miss Apex"	November 25, 2022	9.6%
71	"Coronation Night"	November 26, 2022	9.1%
72	"Lunch Date"	November 28, 2022	8.8%
73	"Pangarap ni Lyneth" (transl. Lyneth's dream)	November 29, 2022	8.4%
74	"Makilala ang Anak" (transl. meet the child)	November 30, 2022	9.7%
75	"Organ Donor"	December 1, 2022	9.0%
76	"Yakap ng Ama" (transl. father's embrace)	December 2, 2022	8.8%
77	"Doctors' Outing"	December 3, 2022	9.3%
78	"Patalbugan" (transl. showdown)	December 5, 2022	8.9%
79	"At the Pool"	December 6, 2022	9.1%
80	"I Still Love Tisay"	December 7, 2022	9.3%
81	"The Necklace"	December 8, 2022	8.7%
82	"Medical Mission"	December 9, 2022	9.2%
83	"Moira vs. Tisay"	December 10, 2022	8.7%
84	"Tulong, Analyn!" (transl. help, Analyn!)	December 12, 2022	8.8%
85	"Sa Bundok" (transl. in the mountains)	December 13, 2022	8.6%
86	"Kaya mo yan, Analyn!" (transl. you can do it, Analyn!)	December 14, 2022	9.2%
87	"Pagliligtas" (transl. safety)	December 15, 2022	9.8%
88	"Selos" (transl. jealous)	December 16, 2022	9.1%
89	"Sino ba si Tisay?" (transl. who is Tisay?)	December 17, 2022	8.7%
90	"Plano ni Analyn" (transl. Analyn's plan)	December 19, 2022	9.0%
91	"Tumakas Ka, Analyn!" (transl. escape, Analyn!)	December 20, 2022	10.1%
92	"May Pag-asa Pa" (transl. there is still hope)	December 21, 2022	10.0%
93	"Saving Analyn"	December 22, 2022	9.5%
94	"Ice Cream Lang" (transl. just ice cream)	December 23, 2022	9.8%
95	"Anak sa Labas" (transl. illegitimate child)	December 24, 2022	8.1%
96	"Buo ang Pamilya" (transl. complete family)	December 26, 2022	8.2%
97	"Sissy"	December 27, 2022	9.0%
98	"Sorpresa ni Regan" (transl. Regan's surprise)	December 28, 2022	9.4%
99	"Banta Kay Zoey" (transl. threat for Zoey)	December 29, 2022	8.6%
100	"Sila Na" (transl. them)	December 30, 2022	N/A
101	"Moira Strikes Again"	December 31, 2022	N/A
102	"Puso at Isip ni RJ" (transl. RJ's heart and mind)	January 2, 2023	9.1%
103	"I'm the Wife"	January 3, 2023	9.7%
104	"The Patient"	January 4, 2023	8.6%
105	"Affected Ka, Girl!" (transl. you're affected, girl!)	January 5, 2023	10.3%
106	"Ang Kambal" (transl. the twin)	January 6, 2023	9.9%
107	"Huwag Patulan" (transl. don't respond)	January 7, 2023	8.4%
108	"This is the Truth"	January 9, 2023	N/A
109	"Let Me Save You"	January 10, 2023	N/A
110	"Respeto Lang" (transl. just respect)	January 11, 2023	9.1%
111	"My Twin Needs Help"	January 12, 2023	9.3%
112	"Personalan" (transl. getting personal)	January 13, 2023	9.6%
113	"Affected si RJ" (transl. RJ is affected)	January 14, 2023	8.6%
114	"Analyn vs. Moira"	January 16, 2023	N/A
115	"Matapobre" (transl. poor)	January 17, 2023	N/A
116	"Go, Regan!"	January 18, 2023	N/A
117	"Father Issues"	January 19, 2023	N/A
118	"Will You Marry Me?"	January 20, 2023	9.2%
119	"Engagement Ring"	January 21, 2023	N/A
120	"Fishball"	January 23, 2023	N/A
121	"Another Chance"	January 24, 2023	N/A
122	"Zoey is Back to Work"	January 25, 2023	N/A
123	"The Date"	January 26, 2023	N/A
124	"Stethoscope"	January 27, 2023	N/A
125	"Date ko si Doc" (transl. doc is my date)	January 28, 2023	N/A
126	"Zoey's Gift"	January 30, 2023	N/A
127	"Pagdududa" (transl. doubt)	January 31, 2023	9.0%
128	"Analyn's Birthday"	February 1, 2023	N/A
129	"CCTV"	February 2, 2023	8.5%
130	"Reveal the Truth"	February 3, 2023	8.1%
131	"Pagtatapat" (transl. confession)	February 4, 2023	9.2%
132	"I'm Your Father"	February 6, 2023	8.8%
133	"Tunay na Ama" (transl. real father)	February 7, 2023	9.0%
134	"Call me your Father"	February 8, 2023	9.0%
135	"Gulo sa ER" (transl. brawl in the ER)	February 9, 2023	N/A
136	"Hostage si Doc" (transl. doc is hostage)	February 10, 2023	9.0%
137	"Mag-ama" (transl. father and daughter)	February 11, 2023	N/A
138	"Lolo Pepe"	February 13, 2023	8.4%
139	"Not Sisters"	February 14, 2023	N/A
140	"Provider"	February 15, 2023	N/A
141	"Isang Relasyon" (transl. one relationship)	February 16, 2023	N/A
142	"Anak ko rin siya" (transl. she's still my child)	February 17, 2023	8.6%
143	"Dalawang Anak" (transl. two children)	February 18, 2023	9.9%
144	"The New Owner"	February 20, 2023	N/A
145	"Tagapagmana" (transl. heir)	February 21, 2023	9.0%
146	"Siblingship"	February 22, 2023	9.0%
147	"The DNA Results"	February 23, 2023	N/A
148	"Confrontation"	February 24, 2023	10.5%
149	"The CCTV Files"	February 25, 2023	9.1%
150	"Accusations"	February 27, 2023	9.6%
151	"The Hard Drive"	February 28, 2023	9.6%
152	"Ang May Sala" (transl. the offender)	March 1, 2023	10.2%
153	"Hindi Tunay na Anak" (transl. false child)	March 2, 2023	10.0%
154	"Tunay na Apo" (transl. real grandchild)	March 3, 2023	9.9%
155	"Don't call me Ate!" (transl. don't call me sister!)	March 4, 2023	10.5%
156	"Rejected"	March 6, 2023	10.5%
157	"RJ's Birthday"	March 7, 2023	9.7%
158	"Symposium"	March 8, 2023	10.1%
159	"Ampao"	March 9, 2023	9.8%
160	"Pagdalaw" (transl. visit)	March 10, 2023	9.9%
161	"Cardiac Arrest"	March 11, 2023	9.4%
162	"Gumising Ka!" (transl. wake up!)	March 13, 2023	9.2%
163	"Sampal" (transl. slap)	March 14, 2023	10.6%
164	"Mga Alaala" (transl. the memories)	March 15, 2023	10.8%
165	"Bintang" (transl. blame)	March 16, 2023	10.3%
166	"Isang Tawag" (transl. one call)	March 17, 2023	11.1%
167	"Sinungaling" (transl. liar)	March 18, 2023	11.4%
168	"Seizure"	March 20, 2023	10.6%
169	"New CEO"	March 21, 2023	11.0%
170	"Allergic"	March 22, 2023	11.4%
171	"The Bomb"	March 23, 2023	11.1%
172	"Bayad sa Ospital" (transl. payment for hospitalization)	March 24, 2023	N/A
173	"The Bomber"	March 25, 2023	N/A
174	"Tama si Analyn" (transl. Analyn is right)	March 27, 2023	10.9%
175	"Ticking Bomb"	March 28, 2023	N/A
176	"Rescue Analyn"	March 29, 2023	11.3%
177	"Better Tanyag"	March 30, 2023	N/A
178	"Pangarap ni Josa" (transl. Josa's wish)	March 31, 2023	10.4%
179	"The Secret"	April 1, 2023	10.5%
180	"Adoption"	April 3, 2023	N/A
181	"Pabayang Ina" (transl. careless mother)	April 4, 2023	N/A
182	"Trusting Moira"	April 5, 2023	10.1%
183	"Puso ng Ina" (transl. mother's heart)	April 10, 2023	10.6%
184	"Sagip Buhay" (transl. saving lives)	April 11, 2023	N/A
185	"Panganib" (transl. danger)	April 12, 2023	10.7%
186	"Sina Ninong at Ninang" (transl. godparents)	April 13, 2023	10.8%
187	"Hinagpis" (transl. saddened)	April 14, 2023	10.3%
188	"Galit" (transl. anger)	April 15, 2023	N/A
189	"Bulaklak" (transl. flower)	April 17, 2023	N/A
190	"Doctors' Duty"	April 18, 2023	N/A
191	"The Killer"	April 19, 2023	N/A
192	"Lihim ni Analyn" (transl. Analyn's secret)	April 20, 2023	9.7%
193	"Isang Panaginip" (transl. one dream)	April 21, 2023	9.8%
194	"Sikreto ni Giselle" (transl. Giselle's secret)	April 22, 2023	9.2%
195	"Marites" (transl. gossiper)	April 24, 2023	N/A
196	"Tita" (transl. aunt)	April 25, 2023	9.3%
197	"Bintangera" (transl. blamer)	April 26, 2023	N/A
198	"Parlor Games"	April 27, 2023	9.9%
199	"Planong Paglipat" (transl. transfer plan)	April 28, 2023	N/A
200	"Kamay ng Doktor" (transl. doctor's hand)	April 29, 2023	9.8%
201	"Hindi Kaya" (transl. I can't do it)	May 1, 2023	9.4%
202	"Ang Aking Kamay" (transl. my hand)	May 2, 2023	10.2%
203	"Parusa" (transl. penalty)	May 3, 2023	N/A
204	"Desisyon" (transl. decision)	May 4, 2023	10.9%
205	"Eastridge"	May 5, 2023	10.8%
206	"Binatang Doktor" (transl. young doctor)	May 6, 2023	9.9%
207	"Gising Na Si RJ" (transl. RJ is now awake)	May 8, 2023	10.5%
208	"Royal Treatment"	May 9, 2023	11.0%
209	"Ang Aking Ina" (transl. my mother)	May 10, 2023	10.3%
210	"Nasaan ang Kotse?" (transl. where is the car?)	May 11, 2023	N/A
211	"Isang Bisita" (transl. a visitor)	May 12, 2023	10.6%
212	"Tennis Bracelet"	May 13, 2023	11.1%
213	"Parinig" (transl. gossip)	May 15, 2023	10.5%
214	"Billboard"	May 16, 2023	9.9%
215	"Passport"	May 17, 2023	9.9%
216	"Bistado si Moira" (transl. Moira is caught)	May 18, 2023	11.0%
217	"Kalagayan ni RJ" (transl. RJ's condition)	May 19, 2023	10.5%
218	"Pagkukunwari" (transl. pretention)	May 20, 2023	10.9%
219	"Mapapapirma" (transl. signing)	May 22, 2023	N/A
220	"Alaga ng Anak" (transl. child's care)	May 23, 2023	11.9%
221	"Despedida" (transl. farewell)	May 24, 2023	10.7%
222	"Pagbisita kay RJ" (transl. visiting RJ)	May 25, 2023	N/A
223	"Karapatan ni Analyn" (transl. Analyn's right)	May 26, 2023	10.8%
224	"Take Over"	May 27, 2023	10.5%
225	"Brainwash"	May 29, 2023	10.6%
226	"Apex is Mine"	May 30, 2023	10.5%
227	"Bagyong Moira" (transl. typhoon Moira)	May 31, 2023	11.2%
228	"Bagong Kakampi" (transl. new ally)	June 1, 2023	N/A
229	"Marites Squad"	June 2, 2023	10.2%
230	"Carlos to the Rescue"	June 3, 2023	9.7%
231	"Balik-Pinas" (transl. return to the Philippines)	June 5, 2023	10.8%
232	"Gaganti Ako" (transl. i'll take revenge)	June 6, 2023	10.8%
233	"Pakikipaglaban" (transl. fighting for)	June 7, 2023	10.2%
234	"Puso ni Carlos" (transl. carlos' heart)	June 8, 2023	10.6%
235	"Caduceus' Necklace"	June 9, 2023	9.9%
236	"Gandang Lyneth" (transl. beautiful Lyneth)	June 10, 2023	10.5%
237	"Better Version"	June 12, 2023	11.8%
238	"Karma is Real"	June 13, 2023	10.4%
239	"Padre de Pamilya" (transl. head of the family)	June 14, 2023	N/A
240	"Lyneth Did It"	June 15, 2023	N/A
241	"Bilog and Mundo" (transl. the world is round)	June 16, 2023	10.1%
242	"Welcome Home, RJ!"	June 17, 2023	N/A
243	"Mga Halik" (transl. the kisses)	June 19, 2023	10.2%
244	"Surprise for Analyn"	June 20, 2023	10.6%
245	"The Interview"	June 21, 2023	11.0%
246	"Photoshoot"	June 22, 2023	10.9%
247	"RJ Visits Apex"	June 23, 2023	11.0%
248	"Karapatan Kay RJ" (transl. right for RJ)	June 24, 2023	11.0%
249	"Double Date"	June 26, 2023	10.9%
250	"Tunay na Reyna" (transl. real queen)	June 27, 2023	N/A
251	"Conjoined Twins"	June 28, 2023	12.4%
252	"Paghahabol" (transl. demand)	June 29, 2023	11.1%
253	"Bardagulan" (transl. brawl)	June 30, 2023	N/A
254	"Analyn, Proud Kami Sayo!" (transl. Analyn, we're proud of you!)	July 1, 2023	9.9%
255	"Damit ni Moira" (transl. Moira's clothes)	July 3, 2023	11.3%
256	"Ganti" (transl. revenge)	July 4, 2023	N/A
257	"Online Clown"	July 5, 2023	11.7%
258	"Para Kay Zoey" (transl. for Zoey)	July 6, 2023	N/A
259	"The Green Hair"	July 7, 2023	10.1%
260	"Forda Ipis" (transl. for the roach)	July 8, 2023	10.7%
261	"Sister or Girlfriend?"	July 10, 2023	10.1%
262	"Lipat Ospital" (transl. transfer of hospital)	July 11, 2023	10.9%
263	"Solutera" (transl. bachelor)	July 12, 2023	11.6%
264	"Carwash Girl"	July 13, 2023	12.1%
265	"Chismis Lang" (transl. it's only gossip)	July 14, 2023	11.4%
266	"Resbak" (transl. revenge)	July 15, 2023	11.8%
267	"Alumni Homecoming"	July 17, 2023	12.2%
268	"Lyneth's Tumbler"	July 18, 2023	12.3%
269	"Masquerade Ball"	July 19, 2023	12.1%
270	"Purga Party"	July 20, 2023	12.2%
271	"Beach Volley"	July 21, 2023	11.9%
272	"Mistress"	July 22, 2023	12.1%
273	"Malungkot ang Beshy Ko" (transl. my bestfriend is lonely)	July 24, 2023	12.2%
274	"Performance Level"	July 25, 2023	12.0%
275	"Stars of the Night"	July 26, 2023	13.3%
276	"Family Picture"	July 27, 2023	13.2%
277	"Dalawang Tatay" (transl. two fathers)	July 28, 2023	13.6%
278	"Doc Lyndon"	July 29, 2023	13.9%
279	"Analyn's Gift"	July 31, 2023	12.6%
280	"Grocery Showcase"	August 1, 2023	12.3%
281	"Fake Charity"	August 2, 2023	12.4%
282	"Pekeng Doctor" (transl. fake doctor)	August 3, 2023	13.0%
283	"Balik-aral" (transl. back to school)	August 4, 2023	N/A
284	"To Save Lives"	August 5, 2023	N/A
285	"Finding Ninang" (transl. finding godmother)	August 7, 2023	12.8%
286	"Cellphone ni RJ" (transl. RJ's cellphone)	August 8, 2023	12.2%
287	"Locker"	August 9, 2023	12.1%
288	"Blackmailing"	August 10, 2023	12.5%
289	"Usapang Past" (transl. talking about the past)	August 11, 2023	11.8%
290	"Cellphone ni Tatay" (transl. father's cellphone)	August 12, 2023	12.3%
291	"Kutob" (transl. hunch)	August 14, 2023	N/A
292	"Assisting Doc Analyn"	August 15, 2023	12.4%
293	"Tagu-taguan" (transl. hide and seek)	August 16, 2023	N/A
294	"Dinner Date"	August 17, 2023	N/A
295	"Anak Ko si Analyn" (transl. Analyn is my daughter)	August 18, 2023	N/A
296	"Pag-amin" (transl. confession)	August 19, 2023	N/A
297	"Masama si Moira" (transl. Moira is bad)	August 21, 2023	N/A
298	"Flowers"	August 22, 2023	13.0%
299	"Lindol" (transl. earthquake)	August 23, 2023	12.8%
300	"Trapped"	August 24, 2023	12.0%
301	"Anyare, Moira?" (transl. what happened, Moira?)	August 25, 2023	N/A
302	"Thank You, Analyn!"	August 26, 2023	N/A
303	"Sagot sa Dalangin" (transl. answer to prayers)	August 28, 2023	12.9%
304	"Gumising Ka, RJ!" (transl. wake up, RJ!)	August 29, 2023	12.7%
305	"Nasaan ang Cellphone?" (transl. where's the cellphone?)	August 30, 2023	N/A
306	"Ceasefire"	August 31, 2023	N/A
307	"I Trust You"	September 1, 2023	N/A
308	"Be Thankful"	September 2, 2023	N/A
309	"Analyn Saved You"	September 4, 2023	N/A
310	"Red Roses"	September 5, 2023	N/A
311	"Away Mag-ina" (transl. fight of mother and daughter)	September 6, 2023	N/A
312	"Sisters' Bonding"	September 7, 2023	N/A
313	"Anak Ko" (transl. my child)	September 8, 2023	N/A
314	"Hanapin si Analyn" (transl. find Analyn)	September 9, 2023	12.1%
315	"Bisita ni Lyneth" (transl. Lyneth's visitor)	September 11, 2023	N/A
316	"The Heart Remembers"	September 12, 2023	N/A
317	"Umalis Ka sa Eastridge" (transl. leave Eastridge)	September 13, 2023	N/A
318	"Ipagluluto Kita" (transl. i'll cook for you)	September 14, 2023	N/A
319	"Model Yarn" (transl. she's a model)	September 15, 2023	N/A
320	"Tatlong Bebe" (transl. three girls)	September 16, 2023	N/A
321	"Marriage Proposal"	September 18, 2023	N/A
322	"Everybody Has a Secret"	September 19, 2023	N/A
323	"Malaman ang Totoo" (transl. know the truth)	September 20, 2023	N/A
324	"Panganib kay Lyndon" (transl. danger for Lyndon)	September 21, 2023	N/A
325	"Saving Lyndon"	September 22, 2023	12.6%
326	"He Saved Me"	September 23, 2023	13.6%
327	"Kunin ang Cellphone!" (transl. get the cellphone!)	September 25, 2023	N/A
328	"Isang Ebidensya" (transl. one evidence)	September 26, 2023	11.4%
329	"Makuha ang Cellphone" (transl. get the cellphone)	September 27, 2023	N/A
330	"Video Recording ni RJ" (transl. RJ's video recording)	September 28, 2023	N/A
331	"May Bagong Ebidensya" (transl. there's new evidence)	September 29, 2023	N/A
332	"CCTV Hard Drive"	September 30, 2023	N/A
333	"Secret Revealed"	October 2, 2023	11.1%
334	"Checkmate"	October 3, 2023	11.4%
335	"Lagot Ka, Moira!" (transl. you're in trouble, Moira!)	October 4, 2023	11.6%
336	"Run, Moira, Run!"	October 5, 2023	13.6%
337	"Lumayas Ka, Moira!" (transl. leave, Moira!)	October 6, 2023	12.5%
338	"Sinisingil Ka Na" (transl. you will pay)	October 7, 2023	11.5%
339	"Pulubi Ka, Gurl!" (transl. you're a beggar, girl!)	October 9, 2023	12.1%
340	"Buhay Walang Pera" (transl. life with no money)	October 10, 2023	11.6%
341	"Ay, Nahulog!" (transl. she fell)	October 11, 2023	N/A
342	"Bonding Kay Tatay" (transl. bonding with father)	October 12, 2023	11.8%
343	"Marshmallow"	October 13, 2023	11.7%
344	"Paghingi ng Tawad" (transl. asking for forgiveness)	October 14, 2023	N/A
345	"Isang Kagat" (transl. one bite)	October 16, 2023	N/A
346	"Delivery Boy"	October 17, 2023	11.2%
347	"Adult Problems"	October 18, 2023	N/A
348	"Engagement Party"	October 19, 2023	11.6%
349	"Gimbal"	October 20, 2023	N/A
350	"It Hurts"	October 21, 2023	N/A
351	"Padating Na ang Karma" (transl. karma is coming)	October 23, 2023	N/A
352	"Scrub Out"	October 24, 2023	11.5%
353	"Isip-Bata" (transl. childish)	October 25, 2023	N/A
354	"Moira in the Window"	October 26, 2023	N/A
355	"Shares ni RJ" (transl. RJ's shares)	October 27, 2023	N/A
356	"Name Your Price"	October 28, 2023	N/A
357	"Kinatatakutan ni Analyn" (transl. what fears analyn)	October 30, 2023	N/A
358	"Iba ang Ugali" (transl. different attitude)	October 31, 2023	10.8%
359	"The Uninvited Guest"	November 1, 2023	10.9%
360	"The Pen"	November 2, 2023	11.9%
361	"Buhay Nurse" (transl. nurse life)	November 3, 2023	13.1%
362	"Mga Pagdududa" (transl. the doubts)	November 4, 2023	N/A
363	"Ituloy Natin ang Kasal" (transl. we should push through with the wedding)	November 6, 2023	N/A
364	"Rambulan" (transl. brawl)	November 7, 2023	11.4%
365	"Wedding"	November 8, 2023	11.3%
366	"Choose Me, Lyneth"	November 9, 2023	11.4%
367	"Lakad sa Altar" (transl. walk in the altar)	November 10, 2023	12.7%
368	"My True Love"	November 11, 2023	11.6%
369	"Sayawan" (transl. dance)	November 13, 2023	N/A
370	"Honeymoon"	November 14, 2023	11.9%
371	"Lipat-Bahay" (transl. house moving)	November 15, 2023	11.4%
372	"Dummy ni Moira" (transl. Moira's dummy)	November 16, 2023	N/A
373	"Mop the Floor"	November 17, 2023	11.3%
374	"Pagtataka ni Pepe" (transl. Pepe's puzzlement)	November 18, 2023	10.6%
375	"At the Laboratory"	November 20, 2023	11.7%
376	"My Real Apo" (transl. my real granddaughter)	November 21, 2023	N/A
377	"Where My Heart Is"	November 22, 2023	11.5%
378	"Hindi Kita Apo!" (transl. you're not my granddaughter)	November 23, 2023	10.9%
379	"Nawawala si Pepe" (transl. Pepe is missing)	November 24, 2023	11.6%
380	"Palusot" (transl. excuse)	November 25, 2023	10.7%
381	"Sundan Si Moira" (transl. follow Moira)	November 27, 2023	11.7%
382	"Sa Warehouse" (transl. in the warehouse)	November 28, 2023	11%
383	"Hukay" (transl. pit)	November 29, 2023	10.3%
384	"Maglolo" (transl. grandfather)	November 30, 2023	9.9%
385	"Kasabwat" (transl. accomplice)	December 1, 2023	10.9%
386	"Nilooban" (transl. invaded)	December 2, 2023	9.7%
387	"Asawa Ka Ba Talaga?" (transl. are you really married?)	December 4, 2023	10.5%
388	"Tulong" (transl. help)	December 5, 2023	11.2%
389	"Isang Daang Milyon" (transl. one hundred million)	December 6, 2023	10.1%
390	"The Offer"	December 7, 2023	9.7%
391	"The Ransom"	December 8, 2023	10.7%
392	"The Kidnapper"	December 9, 2023	10.7%
393	"Nasaan si Lolo?" (transl. where's the grandfather?)	December 11, 2023	10.8%
394	"Gawin ang Tama" (transl. do the right thing)	December 12, 2023	10.5%
395	"Sugat ni Zoey" (transl. Zoey's wound)	December 13, 2023	10.2%
396	"Carlos to the Rescue"	December 14, 2023	9.8%
397	"Bait-baitan" (transl. pretending to be kind)	December 15, 2023	9.8%
398	"Pagtakas" (transl. escape)	December 16, 2023	9.3%
399	"Tatay Mo si Carlos" (transl. Carlos is your father)	December 18, 2023	11.1%
400	"Saving Pepe"	December 19, 2023	10.7%
401	"Takot ni Zoey" (transl. Zoey's fear)	December 20, 2023	10.9%
402	"Guniguni" (transl. hallucination)	December 21, 2023	10.8%
403	"To Serve Lolo" (transl. to serve grandfather)	December 22, 2023	11.2%
404	"Paramdam" (transl. hint)	December 23, 2023	9.1%
405	"Episode 405"	December 25, 2023	6.9%
406	"Episode 406"	December 26, 2023	9.3%
407	"Kaba ni Lyneth" (transl. Lyneth's fear)	December 27, 2023	10.6%
408	"Sino si Justine?" (transl. who is Justine?)	December 28, 2023	10.2%
409	"Mysterious Visitor"	December 29, 2023	10.8%
410	"Reyna Bakulaw" (transl. queen of apes)	December 30, 2023	8.5%
411	"Anak ni Giselle" (transl. Giselle's daughter)	January 1, 2024	7%
412	"'Wag Kang Umalis" (transl. don't leave)	January 2, 2024	10.5%
413	"Regalo" (transl. gift)	January 3, 2024	10.3%
414	"Tatlong Apo" (transl. three grandchildren)	January 4, 2024	10.2%
415	"The Tanyag Girls"	January 5, 2024	10.1%
416	"Feeling Blessed"	January 6, 2024	TBD
417	"Firefly"	January 8, 2024	9.4%
418	"Tanggapin ang Offer" (transl. accept the offer)	January 9, 2024	10.2%
419	"The New VP"	January 10, 2024	9.8%
420	"Tanyag Card"	January 11, 2024	9.3%
421	"Artista Yarn" (transl. she's an artist)	January 12, 2024	9.1%
422	"Miss Pokwang"	January 13, 2024	8.1%
423	"Gagalingan Ko" (transl. i'll do my best)	January 15, 2024	9.2%
424	"Sugat" (transl. wound)	January 16, 2024	9.2%
425	"I'm Not Perfect"	January 17, 2024	9.3%
426	"Hininga" (transl. breath)	January 18, 2024	9.6%
427	"Huli Ka!" (transl. caught you!)	January 19, 2024	9.1%
428	"Ikanta Mo si Moira" (transl. let Moira admit her crime)	January 20, 2024	8.9%
429	"Bistado Na" (transl. caught in the act)	January 22, 2024	9.7%
430	"Welcome to Japan"	January 23, 2024	9.9%
431	"Konnichiwa" (transl. hello)	January 24, 2024	10.5%
432	"Mount Fuji"	January 25, 2024	10.6%
433	"New Identity"	January 26, 2024	10.4%
434	"Dasal" (transl. prayer)	January 27, 2024	8.3%
435	"Air Tag"	January 29, 2024	9.8%
436	"Huli Ka!" (transl. caught you!)	January 30, 2024	10%
437	"Presscon"	January 31, 2024	10.1%
438	"Moira sa Selda" (transl. Moira behind bars)	February 1, 2024	10.9%
439	"Buhay Kulungan" (transl. prison life)	February 2, 2024	10.4%
440	"Pananakit" (transl. hurt)	February 3, 2024	9.8%
441	"Luluhod Ako" (transl. i'll kneel down)	February 5, 2024	9.9%
442	"Sinong Tumawag?" (transl. who called?)	February 6, 2024	10.6%
443	"Ipapatumba" (transl. kill)	February 7, 2024	10.9%
444	"Star Witness"	February 8, 2024	10.4%
445	"Iligtas si Analyn" (transl. save Analyn)	February 9, 2024	11.4%
446	"Duda kay Zoey" (transl. doubt on Zoey)	February 10, 2024	N/A
447	"Muriatic Acid"	February 12, 2024	10.7%
448	"Banta ni Moira" (transl. Moira's threat)	February 13, 2024	10.5%
449	"Tears of Joy"	February 14, 2024	10.5%
450	"Surprise for Carlos"	February 15, 2024	11.2%
451	"Lunch Date"	February 16, 2024	11%
452	"Bartolina" (transl. poster)	February 17, 2024	8.8%
453	"Babala" (transl. warning)	February 19, 2024	10.1%
454	"Paalam, Lolo!" (transl. goodbye, grandfather!)	February 20, 2024	10.8%
455	"Doktor sa Selda" (transl. doctor in prison)	February 21, 2024	10.8%
456	"Mission to Help"	February 22, 2024	11.1%
457	"Bagong Moira" (transl. new Moira)	February 23, 2024	10.5%
458	"Palaro" (transl. game)	February 24, 2024	8.6%
459	"Partner Tayo" (transl. we're partners)	February 26, 2024	10.1%
460	"Galit ni Lotus" (transl. Lotus's anger)	February 27, 2024	10%
461	"Pamilya ni Giselle" (transl. Giselle's family)	February 28, 2024	10%
462	"Medical Clearance"	February 29, 2024	10.3%
463	"Origami"	March 1, 2024	10%
464	"Pumuga" (transl. escape)	March 2, 2024	9.8%
465	"Problema ni Carlos" (transl. Carlos' problem)	March 4, 2024	9.8%
466	"The Guilt"	March 5, 2024	9.6%
467	"Planong Bakasyon" (transl. plan for vacation)	March 6, 2024	9.7%
468	"Red Carpet"	March 7, 2024	10.7%
469	"Natagpuan sa Creek" (transl. found in the creek)	March 8, 2024	8%
470	"Saklaan" (transl. crutch)	March 9, 2024	8.6%
471	"She is Missing"	March 11, 2024	7.9%
472	"Lihim ni Carlos" (transl. Carlos' secret)	March 12, 2024	8.6%
473	"Killer Doctor"	March 13, 2024	9.3%
474	"I Can Feel It"	March 14, 2024	10.7%
475	"Sinigang"	March 15, 2024	10%
476	"Tumakas Ka, Lyneth!" (transl. escape, Lyneth!)	March 16, 2024	9.6%
477	"Rescue Me"	March 18, 2024	11.7%
478	"Help Me, Harry!"	March 19, 2024	11.2%
479	"Sumbong" (transl. report)	March 20, 2024	10.8%
480	"Desisyon ni Harry" (transl. Harry's decision)	March 21, 2024	10.8%
481	"Mahal Kita" (transl. I love you)	March 22, 2024	11%
482	"Saving Lyneth"	March 23, 2024	10%
483	"Ligtas Ka Na" (transl. You're Safe)	March 25, 2024	11.1%
484	"Pink Bouquet"	March 26, 2024	10.9%
485	"Nakita Ko si Carlos" (transl. I Saw Carlos)	March 27, 2024	10.6%
486	"To Protect You"	April 1, 2024	10%
487	"Selos is the Key" (transl. jealousy is the key)	April 2, 2024	9.9%
488	"Justice for Pepe"	April 3, 2024	10.4%
489	"The Mastermind"	April 4, 2024	10.5%
490	"Version of Truth"	April 5, 2024	10.7%
491	"Fabrication"	April 6, 2024	10.7%
492	"Our Parents"	April 8, 2024	10.6%
493	"Para Kay Nanay" (transl. for nother)	April 9, 2024	11.3%
494	"Bisita sa ICU" (transl. visitor in the ICU)	April 10, 2024	10.9%
495	"Maging Buo ang Pamilya" (transl. to have a complete family)	April 11, 2024	10.8%
496	"Malaya na Ako!" (transl. i'm free!)	April 12, 2024	10.6%
497	"Scapegoat"	April 13, 2024	10.4%
498	"Outbreak"	April 15, 2024	11.4%
499	"Lockdown"	April 16, 2024	11.1%
500	"Hawaan" (transl. infection)	April 17, 2024	11.3%
501	"Panalangin" (transl. prayer)	April 18, 2024	10.4%
502	"Isang Operasyon" (transl. one operation)	April 19, 2024	10.2%
503	"Infected Ako" (transl. i'm infected)	April 20, 2024	9.5%
504	"Lumalala" (transl. worsen)	April 22, 2024	10.6%
505	"Mahigpit na Yakap" (transl. tight hug)	April 23, 2024	10.1%
506	"Gamot" (transl. medicine)	April 24, 2024	10.6%
507	"Welcome Back"	April 25, 2024	11%
508	"Marites 4ever"	April 26, 2024	10.7%
509	"Analyn Meets Black Rider"	April 27, 2024	9.2%
510	"Ambulance"	April 29, 2024	9.9%
511	"Cactus Fight"	April 30, 2024	10%
512	"Justine vs. Analyn"	May 1, 2024	8.7%
513	"Someone is Watching"	May 2, 2024	9.8%
514	"Zoey and Dax"	May 3, 2024	9.6%
515	"Isang Bitag" (transl. one trap)	May 4, 2024	8.8%
516	"Buking Ka Na, Moira!" (transl. you're already eposed, Moira!)	May 6, 2024	10.5%
517	"Hulihin si Moira" (transl. arrest Moira)	May 7, 2024	10.3%
518	"At The Yacht"	May 8, 2024	10.6%
519	"Birthday Surprise"	May 9, 2024	10.4%
520	"Biyaheng Impyerno" (transl. trip to hell)	May 10, 2024	10.9%
521	"Pasabog" (transl. surprise)	May 11, 2024	10%
522	"To the Rescue"	May 13, 2024	10.2%
523	"Nasaan si Moira?" (transl. where is Moira?)	May 14, 2024	11.2%
524	"End of Evil"	May 15, 2024	11.3%
525	"Moira is Dead"	May 16, 2024	10.6%
526	"At the Funeral"	May 17, 2024	10%
527	"She's Not Dead"	May 18, 2024	9%
528	"Balak ni Carlos" (transl. Carlos' plan)	May 20, 2024	10.1%
529	"Episode 529"	May 21, 2024	10.2%
530	"Sa Sementeryo" (transl. at the cemetery)	May 22, 2024	10.4%
531	"Wig ni Moira" (transl. Moira's wig)	May 23, 2024	10.2%
532	"Criminal Lover"	May 24, 2024	10.8%
533	"Kundisyon ni Carlos" (transl. Carlos' condition)	May 25, 2024	9.3%
534	"Nakita Ko si Moira" (transl. I saw Moira)	May 27, 2024	9.3%
535	"Hospital Arrest"	May 28, 2024	8.8%
536	"Pakiusap ni Harry" (transl. Harry's request)	May 29, 2024	8.1%
537	"Shares ng APEX" (transl. shares of APEX)	May 30, 2024	8.6%
538	"Brillant Acting"	May 31, 2024	9.1%
539	"Madam Chantal"	June 1, 2024	7.5%
540	"Moira's Mother"	June 3, 2024	9%
541	"Celebrity Photo"	June 4, 2024	9.6%
542	"Palpak Ka, Zoey" (transl. you failed, Zoey)	June 5, 2024	8.9%
543	"Sampal ng Ina" (transl. mother's slap)	June 6, 2024	9.6%
544	"Escabetche"	June 7, 2024	9.1%
545	"Dugo" (transl. blood)	June 8, 2024	8.2%
546	"At the Mall"	June 10, 2024	8.6%
547	"Panis" (transl. lost)	June 11, 2024	10%
548	"Tree Planting"	June 12, 2024	8.9%
549	"Pregnancy Test"	June 13, 2024	8.8%
550	"Lab Results ni Zoey" (transl. Zoey's lab results)	June 14, 2024	8.5%
551	"Paninindigan" (transl. affirmation)	June 15, 2024	7.8%
552	"Ama ng Bata" (transl. father of the child)	June 17, 2024	9.8%
553	"Pakakasalan Kita, Zoey" (transl. i'll marry you, Zoey)	June 18, 2024	9.2%
554	"For My Baby"	June 19, 2024	9.6%
555	"Doctor Cifra"	June 20, 2024	8.6%
556	"ZoDax"	June 21, 2024	9%
557	"Taksil" (transl. betrayal)	June 22, 2024	8.4%
558	"Hindi Ako ang Ama" (transl. i'm not the father)	June 24, 2024	9.1%
559	"Pagtanan" (transl. eloping)	June 25, 2024	10.3%
560	"Target"	June 26, 2024	9.5%
561	"Baby ni Zoey" (transl. Zoey's baby)	June 27, 2024	9.1%
562	"Kapatid ni Moira" (transl. Moira's sister)	June 28, 2024	9.5%
563	"Baby Shower"	June 29, 2024	7.4%
564	"Zoey vs. Lyneth"	July 1, 2024	9.1%
565	"Trapped si Lyneth" (transl. Lyneth is trapped)	July 2, 2024	8.9%
566	"Ang Nanay Ko" (transl. my mother)	July 3, 2024	10%
567	"Morgana Go"	July 4, 2024	9.4%
568	"Muling Pagkabuhay" (transl. rebirth)	July 5, 2024	9.3%
569	"Finding Zoey"	July 6, 2024	7.5%
570	"Get Out!"	July 8, 2024	8.3%
571	"Libingan ni Moira" (transl. Moira's burial)	July 9, 2024	10%
572	"Operation: Hukay" (transl. operation: grave)	July 10, 2024	9.1%
573	"Himas Selda" (transl. rub the cell)	July 11, 2024	8.8%
574	"Morgana is My Mom"	July 12, 2024	8.3%
575	"Mag-ina Reunited" (transl. mother and daughter reunited)	July 13, 2024	8.7%
576	"Morgana's DNA"	July 15, 2024	8.6%
577	"Wushu Lesson"	July 16, 2024	10.3%
578	"Nushi and Morgana"	July 17, 2024	9.7%
579	"Wushu Instructor"	July 18, 2024	10.4%
580	"Chantal's Offer"	July 19, 2024	9.2%
581	"Women's Center"	July 20, 2024	9.3%
582	"Provoking Moira"	July 22, 2024	12.7%
583	"Pagtakas ni Carlos" (transl. Carlos' escape)	July 23, 2024	12.1%
584	"Dating Game"	July 24, 2024	11.7%
585	"Pinili ni RJ" (transl. RJ's choice)	July 25, 2024	11.8%
586	"Ginang APEX" (transl. Mrs. APEX)	July 26, 2024	12%
587	"Anyare, Morgana?" (transl. what happened, Morgana?)	July 27, 2024	N/A
588	"And the Winner is..."	July 29, 2024	8.4%
589	"Morgana vs. Giselle"	July 30, 2024	8.5%
590	"Botohan" (transl. vote)	July 31, 2024	9%
591	"Viral si Giselle" (transl. Giselle is viral)	August 1, 2024	8.1%
592	"Bistida" (transl. dress)	August 2, 2024	8.3%
593	"Spa Day"	August 3, 2024	8.5%
594	"Farm Reveal"	August 5, 2024	9.2%
595	"Find the Key"	August 6, 2024	9.6%
596	"Fistfight"	August 7, 2024	9.2%
597	"Kasuhan si Giselle" (transl. file a case against Giselle)	August 8, 2024	8.8%
598	"Pabayang Anak" (transl. neglectful child)	August 9, 2024	8.1%
599	"Pasabog" (transl. surprise)	August 10, 2024	8.5%
600	"May Pagseselosan" (transl. something to be jealous about)	August 12, 2024	8.3%
601	"Tatlong Babae" (transl. three girls)	August 13, 2024	8.5%
602	"First Love"	August 14, 2024	7.8%
603	"Tatlong Girlfriend" (transl. three girlfriends)	August 15, 2024	7.2%
604	"Code Blue"	August 16, 2024	7.8%
605	"The Coat"	August 17, 2024	7.5%
606	"Certified Oppa"	August 19, 2024	7%
607	"Albularyo"	August 20, 2024	7.5%
608	"Isang Desisyon" (transl. one decision)	August 21, 2024	8.3%
609	"Ikaw Lang, RJ" (transl. only you, RJ)	August 22, 2024	7.8%
610	"Will You Marry Me?"	August 23, 2024	8.4%
611	"My Girlfriend"	August 24, 2024	N/A
612	"Pogi si Doc" (transl. Doc is handsome)	August 26, 2024	8.8%
613	"Bridal Shower"	August 27, 2024	8.7%
614	"Mag-asawang Sampal" (transl. slap from the couple)	August 28, 2024	9.5%
615	"Alaala ni RJ" (transl. RJ's memory)	August 29, 2024	8.4%
616	"Duda kay Carlos" (transl. doubt on Carlos)	August 30, 2024	8.4%
617	"Morgana's Plan"	August 31, 2024	8%
618	"To The Wedding"	September 2, 2024	10.2%
619	"Wedding Entourage"	September 3, 2024	10.5%
620	"Sunog sa Kasal" (transl. fire at the wedding)	September 4, 2024	9.6%
621	"Where is Analyn?"	September 5, 2024	9.6%
622	"Iligtas si Analyn" (transl. save Analyn)	September 6, 2024	8.2%
623	"Fake Money"	September 7, 2024	N/A
624	"Bag Locator"	September 9, 2024	8.9%
625	"Hawak ni Carlos" (transl. with Carlos)	September 10, 2024	8.9%
626	"Tulong" (transl. help)	September 11, 2024	9.1%
627	"Saving Doc Analyn"	September 12, 2024	9.1%
628	"Ang May Sala" (transl. the offender)	September 13, 2024	8.7%
629	"Dr. Kim to the Rescue"	September 14, 2024	8.6%
630	"Pagtakas" (transl. escape)	September 16, 2024	9%
631	"A Flash of Memory"	September 17, 2024	8.7%
632	"Hindi Totoong Tanyag" (transl. not the real Tanyag)	September 18, 2024	9%
633	"Alaala ni RJ" (transl. RJ's memory)	September 19, 2024	8.5%
634	"Sikreto ng mga Tanyag" (transl. the Tanyag family's secret)	September 20, 2024	8.4%
635	"Patahimikin si Justine" (transl. put Justine to silence)	September 21, 2024	8.1%
636	"Zoey's Secret"	September 23, 2024	9%
637	"Morgana's Act"	September 24, 2024	9.9%
638	"Hindi Totoong Anak" (transl. not the real child)	September 25, 2024	8.7%
639	"Pagkukunwari ni Zoey" (transl. Zoey's pretence)	September 26, 2024	8.6%
640	"Matagal Nang Alam" (transl. long known)	September 27, 2024	8.5%
641	"Surprise Visit"	September 28, 2024	N/A
642	"Sa Elevator" (transl. at the elevator)	September 30, 2024	8.7%
643	"The Mascot"	October 1, 2024	8.9%
644	"Disowning Zoey"	October 2, 2024	9.8%
645	"Plano kay Carlos" (transl. plan for Carlos)	October 3, 2024	9.5%
646	"Hanapin ang Vial" (transl. find the vial)	October 4, 2024	8.9%
647	"Suspencion"	October 5, 2024	N/A
648	"The Deal With RJ"	October 7, 2024	N/A
649	"Bagong CEO" (transl. New CEO)	October 8, 2024	N/A
650	"Nushi to the Rescue"	October 9, 2024	N/A
651	"Morgana Vs. Morgana"	October 10, 2024	10%
652	"Pag-Amin" (transl. Confession)	October 11, 2024	N/A
653	"Pagtugis Kay Moira" (transl. Chasing Moira)	October 12, 2024	10.5%
654	"Zoey's Betrayal"	October 14, 2024	10.2%
655	"Moira Vs. Zoey"	October 15, 2024	10%
656	"Hostage Taking"	October 16, 2024	N/A
657	"Tunay Na Pamilya" (transl. Real Family)	October 17, 2024	N/A
658	"Remote Control"	October 18, 2024	10.3%
659	"Finale"	October 19, 2024	9.6%
