= Zoey Tanyag =

Fictional character in Abot-Kamay na Pangarap

- Abot-Kamay na Pangarap character
- Kazel Kinouchi as Zoey Tanyag
- First appearance: "Ikaw Na Nga Ba, Dok Tanyag?" (Episode #4) (Note: transl. Is it you, Dr. Tanyag?)
- Last appearance: Naabot na Pangarap (Episode #659; Finale) (Note: transl. A Dream Within Reach)
- Created by: Geng Delgado
- Portrayed by: Kazel Kinouchi; Kyle Ocampo (young)

In-universe information
- Full name: Zoey Rutaquio Tanyag Zoey R. Benitez (formerly)
- Species: Human
- Gender: Female
- Occupation: Medical doctor
- Family: Robert Jose Tanyag (father); Moira Tanyag (mother)
- Relatives: Analyn Santos (half-sister)
- Nationality: Filipino

Zoey Tanyag is a fictional character from the GMA Network medical drama television series, Abot-Kamay na Pangarap. She is portrayed by Kazel Kinouchi. Tanyag is depicted as a jealous and mean doctor who constantly competes with others, yet her character gradually evolves as she learns to change for the better in the demanding world of medicine.

== Character background ==
Dra. Zoey Tanyag works at APEX Medical Hospital. She is confident in her skills but can be very proud, which often leads her to clash with her old classmate Analyn Santos. She is the daughter of Moira Tanyag and Dr. Robert Jose Tanyag. From the beginning, she underestimates others, especially Analyn, and this creates problems with her coworkers and supervisors. Because of this, many people see her as strict and unapproachable.

Zoey is bitter toward Analyn because of her strained relationship with her father. Later, she learns that he is also Analyn's biological father. Learning this makes Zoey even more upset, because she feels her father never really cared for her. She still worries about herself a lot. She wants to prove she can do things right. At work, she makes mistakes and faces hard choices. She notices how she affects other people. She starts to own up to what she did wrong.

== Portrayal ==
Zoey Tanyag is played by actress Kazel Kinouchi. Her performance was noted for giving depth to a character who is both strong and imperfect. Pao Apostol of ABS-CBN described her portrayal as "effective" and "believably fierce", earning attention for her intense confrontations with Jillian Ward's character. Kinouchi mentioned in interviews that playing [Zoey] the character challenged her acting skills and helped her grow as an actress. She explained that taking on an antagonist meant exploring the character's emotions and reasons for her actions, instead of presenting her as purely villainous.

Viewers of Filipino telenovelas often become deeply invested in the characters, and because of this, some expressed strong dislike toward the role she played. In an interview with the Philippine Entertainment Portal, Kinouchi said she had not encountered hostile reactions from the public despite portraying an antagonist. She remarked, "Fortunately, I haven't experienced anything like that yet because I rarely go out."
