= Trudis Liit (TV series) =

2010 Philippine television drama series

- Title card
- Also known as: Little Trudis
- Genre: Comedy drama
- Created by: Mars Ravelo
- Based on: Trudis Liit (1963) by Jose de Villa
- Written by: Agnes Gagelonia-Uligan; Keiko Aquino; Mitchiko Yamamoto; Maribel Ilagan
- Directed by: Don Michael Perez
- Creative director: Jun Lana
- Starring: Jillian Ward
- Opening theme: "Tomorrow" by Jillian Ward
- Country of origin: Philippines
- Original language: Tagalog
- No. of episodes: 90

Production
- Executive producer: Mona Coles-Mayuga
- Camera setup: Multiple-camera setup
- Running time: 25–35 minutes
- Production company: GMA Entertainment TV

Original release
- Network: GMA Network
- Release: June 21 – October 22, 2010

Trudis Liit (transl. Trudis little / international title: Little Trudis) is a 2010 Philippine television drama comedy series broadcast by GMA Network. Based on a 1963 Philippine film of the same title, the series is the twenty-first and final instalment of Sine Novela. Directed by Don Michael Perez, it stars Jillian Ward in the title role. It premiered on June 21, 2010 on the network's Dramarama sa Hapon line up. The series concluded on October 22, 2010, with a total of 90 episodes.

The series is streaming online on YouTube.

== Cast and characters ==
Lead cast

- Jillian Ward as Gertrudis "Trudis" Capili-Ferrer

Supporting cast

- Gina Alajar as Lolita "Lolly" Toledo
- Ian Veneracion as Bogart Perez
- Cris Villanueva as Niccolo "Nick" Ferrer
- Pauleen Luna as Honelyn "Honey" Toledo-Ferrer
- Mike Tan as Miguelito "Migs" Ocampo
- Maxene Magalona as Mercedes "Ched" Cristobal
- Bella Flores as Hershey Ferrer
- Jao Mapa as Catalino "Lino" Capili
- Maricel Morales as Magdalena "Magda" Basco-Capili
- Dexter Doria as Carmen "Menang" Cristobal
- Archie Adamos as Carlos "Carling" Cristobal
- Francheska Salcedo as Sugar Toledo
- Jamaica Mikaella Olivera as Guadalupe "Upeng" Capili
- Marc Acueza as Alvin
- Robert Ortega as Bogart
- Yul Servo as Johnny "Lando" Manabat
- Chynna Ortaleza as Precious Toledo
- Russianne Jandris Ilao
- Jhiz Deocareza

== Production ==
Principal photography concluded on October 5, 2010.

== Ratings ==
According to AGB Nielsen Philippines' Mega Manila People/Individual television ratings, the pilot episode of Trudis Liit earned a 6.3% rating. The final episode scored an 8% rating.

== Accolades ==
Accolades received by Trudis Liit
Year	Award	Category	Recipient	Result	Ref.
2011	25th PMPC Star Awards for Television	Best New Female TV Personality	Jillian Ward	Won	
