= Vince Maristela =

Filipino actor (born 2000)

- Born: Vincent Jedrick Bailon Maristela; March 7, 2000 (age 26); Cainta, Rizal, Philippines
- Occupation: Actor
- Years active: 2007–present
- Agent: Sparkle (2019–present)

Vincent Jedrick Bailon Maristela is a Filipino actor.

== Early life ==
Vince Maristela was born on March 7, 2000 in Cainta, Rizal Province, Philippines. He attended De La Salle University and graduated in 2023 with a degree in marketing management.

== Career ==
Maristela is first seen on the Philippine Television Network GMA Network at All-Out Sundays, Love Before Sunrise as Memot Sulit, Luv Is: Caught in his Arms, as Tristan Matteo and Encantadia Chronicles: Sang're as Akiro Nuñez.

== Filmography ==
Key
†	Denotes films or TV productions that have not yet been released

=== Film ===
Year	Title	Role	Ref.
2007	Ang Cute ng Ina Mo!	Young Val Quizon	
2025	Love You So Bad	Jed	

=== Television ===
Year	Title	Role	Ref.
2026–present	Delivery Boi	Winston Aldomovar	
2026	Barangay Love Stories	Greg	
2026	Love, Siargao	Archie	
2026	The Secrets of Hotel 88	Peter Montevilla (first antagonist role)	
2025–2026	Hating Kapatid	Wesley	
2025	Regal Studio Presents: My Super Paranoid Girlfriend		
2025	Daig Kayo Ng Lola Ko: Beast Friends Forever		
2025	It's Showtime	Himself/Guest	
2025	Rainbow Rumble	Himself/Contestant	
2025	Encantadia Chronicles: Sang'gre	Akiro Nuñez	
2025	Pinoy Big Brother: Celebrity Collab Edition	Himself/Housemate	
2025	Regal Studio Presents: What Boys Think	Patrick	
2025	My Ilonggo Girl	John Paul "Jampol" Pedroso	
2024–2025	Trggrd!	Himself/Host	
2024	Open 24/7	Felix Santillan	
2024	Regal Studio Presents: May The Best Man Win	Ethan	
2024	Tadhana: Lucky in Love	Rodney	
2024	The Boobay and Tekla Show	Himself/Guest	
2023	Fast Talk with Boy Abunda	Himself/Guest	
2023	Luv Is: Caught in His Arms	Tristan Mateo Azcona Ferell	
2023	Love Before Sunrise	Memot Sulit	
2023	All-Out Sundays	Himself	
2023	Wish Ko Lang!: Love Obsession	Ryan	
2022–2024	TiktoClock	Himself/Guest	
2022–2023	Daig Kayo ng Lola Ko	Various roles	
