= My Father's Wife =

2025 Philippine television drama series

- Title card
- Genre: Romantic drama
- Directed by: Aya Topacio; Dominic Zapata
- Creative director: Aloy Adlawan
- Starring: Kazel Kinouchi; Gabby Concepcion; Kylie Padilla; Jak Roberto
- Theme music composer: Rina Mercado
- Opening theme: "Sa Gitna ng Lahat" by Thea Astley
- Country of origin: Philippines
- Original language: Tagalog
- No. of episodes: 96

Production
- Camera setup: Multiple-camera setup
- Running time: 24–28 minutes
- Production company: GMA Entertainment Group

Original release
- Network: GMA Network
- Release: June 23 – October 11, 2025

My Father's Wife is a 2025 Philippine television drama romance series broadcast by GMA Network. Directed by Aya Topacio and Dominic Zapata, it stars Kazel Kinouchi, Gabby Concepcion, Kylie Padilla and Jak Roberto. It premiered on June 23, 2025 on the network's Afternoon Prime line up. The series concluded on October 11, 2025, with a total of 96 episodes.

The series is streaming online on YouTube.

== Cast and characters ==
Cast

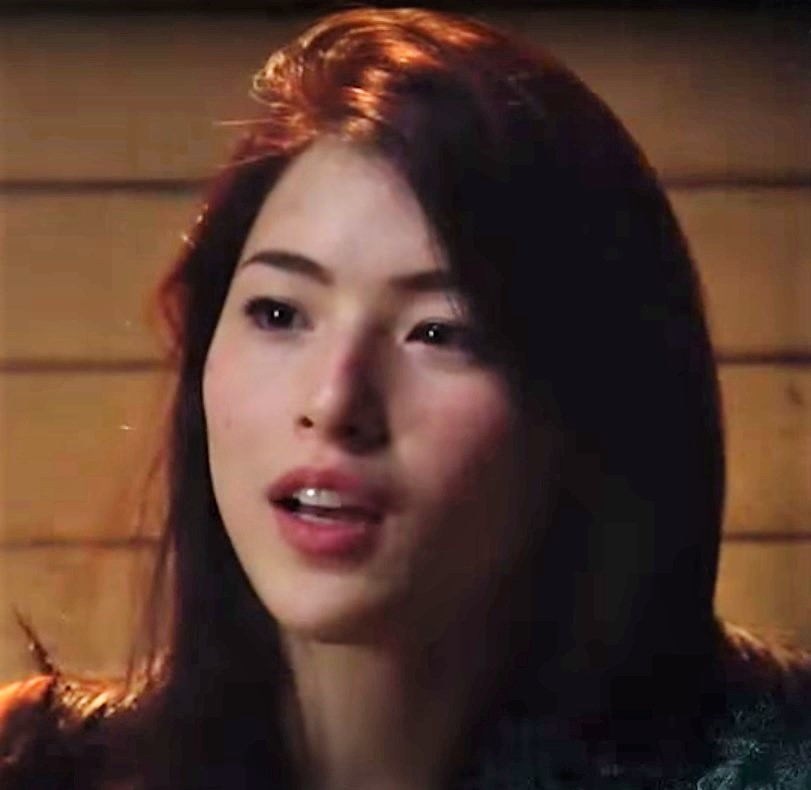
Kylie Padilla

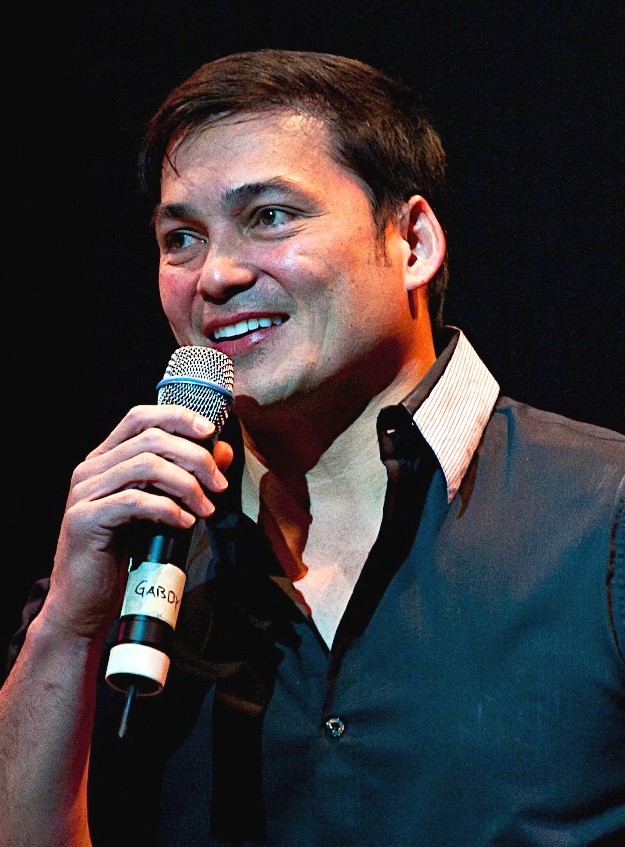
Gabby Concepcion

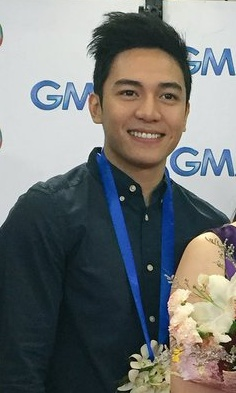
Jak Roberto

Lead cast

- Kazel Kinouchi as Betsy Morales
- Gabby Concepcion as Robert Rodriguez
- Kylie Padilla as Gina Rodriguez
- Jak Roberto as Gerald Reyes

Supporting cast

- Arlene Muhlach as Connie
- Andre Paras as Mackie
- Maureen Larrazabal as Susan
- Sue Prado as Nora
- Caitlyn Stave as Julia
- Shan Vesagas as Tolits

Guest cast

- Snooky Serna as Minda Rodriguez
- Yul Servo as Marcelino "Marcel/Jun" Santos Jr.
- Dina Bonnevie as Vivian

== Development ==
The series and its cast members were announced in March 2025.

== Production ==
Principal photography commenced in May 2025.

== Ratings ==
According to AGB Nielsen Philippines' Nationwide Urban Television Audience Measurement People in television homes, the pilot episode of My Father's Wife earned a 5.7% rating. The finale episode earned a 7.2% rating.
