= Alvin Francisco =

Filipino radiologist, and media personality

- Born: Alvin John Francisco; July 25, 1987 (age 39); Philippines
- Education: De La Salle University – Dasmariñas (BS Biology); De La Salle Medical and Health Sciences Institute (M.D.)
- Occupations: Radiologist; vlogger

YouTube information
- Channel: Doc Alvin
- Genre: Informative vlogging
- Subscribers: 1.09M
- Views: 80M
- Last updated: October 12, 2024

Alvin John Francisco (July 25, 1987) is a Filipino radiologist and social media personality known for his informative videos online wherein he debunks myths and clarifies questions regarding health conditions.

== Education and medical career ==
Francisco graduated his pre-med in De La Salle University – Dasmariñas with BS Biology. He got his M.D. degree from De La Salle Medical and Health Sciences Institute, and got his clinical clerkship experience from the same school, and medical internship in the Army General Hospital in Fort Bonifacio. He is currently working as a resident radiologist at National Kidney and Transplant Institute.

== Internet career ==
In 2020, while in the middle of COVID-19 pandemic, he started uploading YouTube videos about his everyday routine as radiologist, but later uploaded videos about reviewing and sharing medical facts about medical disease and complications suffered by some famous people like Kris Aquino, John Regala, and many more. He also review some medical shows on its portrayal of medical procedures. He also uploaded in TikTok, and also hosted a podcast named Doc Alvin: The Podcast.

He also appeared on TV drama Abot-Kamay na Pangarap.

But in April 2023, a Vera Files article contradicted Francisco's claim in a video he uploaded that claim that oral glutathione helps reverse fatty liver.

== As subject of deepfake ==
Like another medical doctor in social media Willie Ong, name and videos were used by some social media scammers to deepfake and advertise some products. Some of those are: a fake video showing that he was interviewed by CNN with promotion of ‘joint pain cure’ ad, and using his photo for advertisement of hypertension cure.

== Personal life ==
In 2022, he surprised his fans when he posted his pre-wedding photos with his fiancée, Maki Bondoc, in London.
