= Love Before Sunrise =

2023 Philippine television drama series

- Title card
- Genre: Romantic drama
- Created by: Denoy Navarro-Punio; Christine Novicio
- Written by: Denoy Navarro-Punio; Anna Aleta Nadela; Christine Novicio
- Directed by: Mark Sicat dela Cruz
- Creative director: Aloy Adlawan
- Starring: Dennis Trillo; Bea Alonzo
- Opening theme: "From Afar" by Rita Daniela
- Country of origin: Philippines
- Original language: Tagalog
- No. of episodes: 70

Production
- Executive producer: Michele Robles Borja
- Cinematography: Mac Cosico
- Editor: Robert Ryan Reyes
- Camera setup: Multiple-camera setup
- Running time: 26–46 minutes
- Production company: GMA Entertainment Group

Original release
- Network: GMA Network
- Release: September 25 – December 29, 2023

Love Before Sunrise is a 2023 Philippine television drama romance series broadcast by GMA Network. Directed by Mark Sicat dela Cruz, it stars Dennis Trillo and Bea Alonzo. It premiered on September 25, 2023 on the network's Telebabad line up. The series concluded on December 29, 2023, with a total of 70 episodes.

The series is streaming online on Viu and YouTube.

== Cast and characters ==
Cast

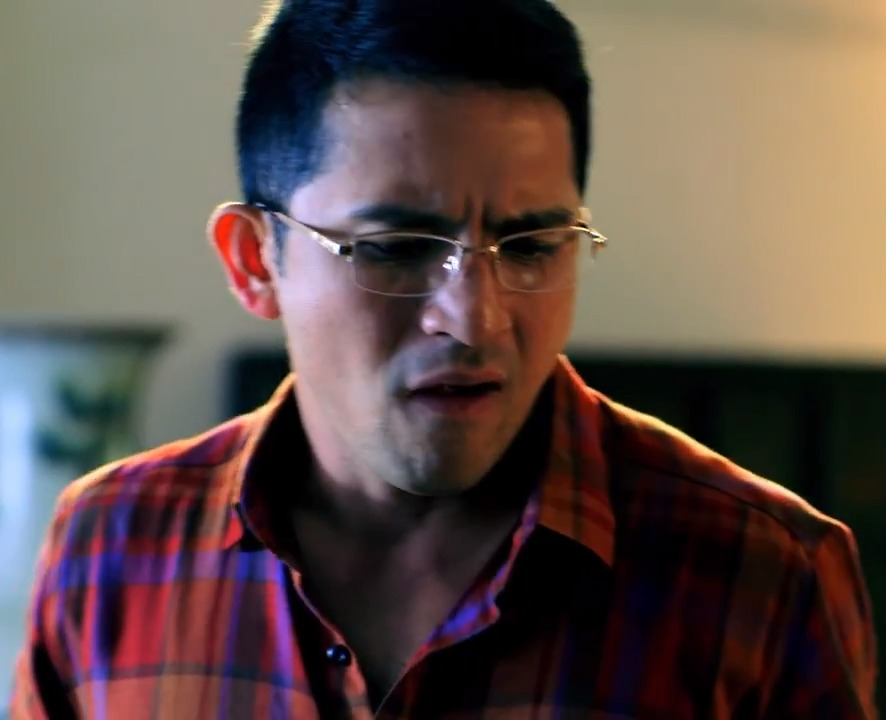
Dennis Trillo

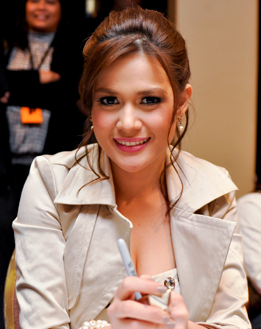
Bea Alonzo

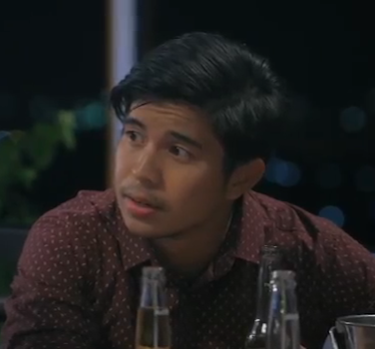
Rodjun Cruz

Lead cast

- Dennis Trillo as Artemio "Atom" Menandrez Jr.
- Bea Alonzo as Stella Domingo

Supporting cast

- Andrea Torres as Czarina Montelibano
- Sid Lucero as Roald Vibal
- Ricky Davao as Rodrigo Montelibano
- Tetchie Agbayani as Zoraya Vibal
- Isay Alvarez-Seña as Lilian "Liling" Domingo
- Jackie Lou Blanco as Amparo Montelibano
- Nadia Montengero as Nida Sulit
- Matet de Leon as Daisy Lacson-Pagdilao
- Vaness del Moral as Marijo Alcantara
- Rodjun Cruz as Enrico "Rico" Domingo
- Sef Cadayona as Bong Pagdilao
- Cheska Fausto as Mutya Domingo
- Vince Maristela as Memot Sulit

Guest cast

- Lito Pimentel as Artemio Menandrez Sr.
- Bodjie Pascua as an old man
- Nanette Inventor as Rocio
- Sharmaine Arnaiz as Aurora
- William Lorenzo as Rolly
- Monching Gutierrez as Castor Domingo
- Jeniffer Maravilla as Jing
- Jason Abalos as Jerson
- Simon Ibarra as Robin Ramos
- Seth dela Cruz as younger Atom
- Dayara Shane as younger Stella
- Jose Sarasola as Judah
- Thia Thomalla as Margot
- Gileth Sandico as Choleng
- Angel Raymundo as Violy
- Art Acuña as Max Blanco
- Sheila Marie Rodriguez as Ditas Blanco
- Pancho Magno as Matthew
- Ericca Laude as Sky Menandrez

== Production ==
Principal photography commenced in April 2023.

== Ratings ==
According to AGB Nielsen Philippines' Nationwide Urban Television Audience Measurement People in Television Homes, the pilot episode of Love Before Sunrise earned an 8% rating.

== Accolades ==
Accolades received by Love Before Sunrise
Year	Award	Category	Recipient	Result	Ref.
2024	Seoul International Drama Awards	Best Drama	Love Before Sunrise	Nominated	
2025	37th PMPC Star Awards for Television	Best Drama Actress	Bea Alonzo	Nominated	
2025	37th PMPC Star Awards for Television	Best New Male TV Personality	Vince Maristela	Nominated	
