= Binibining Marikit =

2025 Philippine television drama series

- Title card
- Also known as: Hello, Miss Beautiful
- Genre: Drama; Romantic comedy
- Created by: Kit Villanueva-Zapata
- Written by: Christine Novocio; Patrick Louie Ilagan; Nehemiarey Dallego; Marlon Miguel
- Directed by: Jorron Lee Monroy
- Creative director: Aloy Adlawan
- Starring: Herlene Budol
- Theme music composer: John Patrick Caoile; Kyle Caplis
- Opening theme: "Marikit" by Sean Lucas
- Country of origin: Philippines
- Original language: Tagalog
- No. of episodes: 100

Production
- Executive producer: Lenie Gonzales-Santos
- Production locations: Tanay, Rizal
- Camera setup: Multiple-camera setup
- Running time: 21–32 minutes
- Production company: GMA Entertainment Group

Original release
- Network: GMA Network
- Release: February 10 – June 27, 2025

Binibining Marikit (transl. beautiful lady / international title: Hello, Miss Beautiful) is a 2025 Philippine television drama romantic comedy series broadcast by GMA Network. Directed by Jorron Lee Monroy, it stars Herlene Budol in the title role. It premiered on February 10, 2025, on the network's Afternoon Prime line up. The series concluded on June 27, 2025, with a total of 100 episodes.

The series is streaming online on YouTube.

== Cast and characters ==
Cast

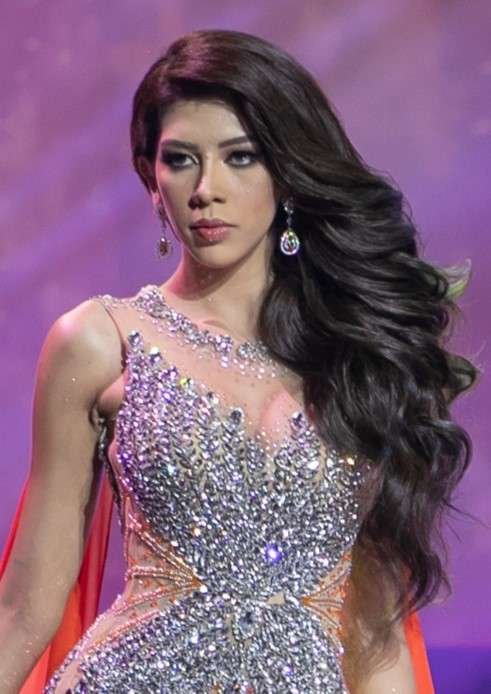
Herlene Budol

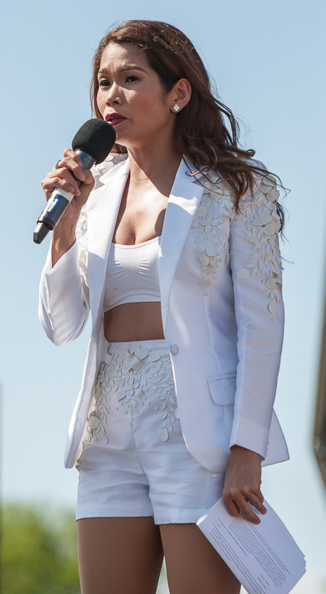
Pokwang

Lead cast

- Herlene Budol as Marikit "Ikit" Caringal

Supporting cast

- Pokwang as Mayumi Smith
- Tony Labrusca as Andrew "Drew" Jimenez
- Kevin Dasom as Matthew "Matt" Smith
- Cris Villanueva as Isagani "Gani" Caringal
- Almira Muhlach as Rica Torres-Caringal
- Thea Tolentino as Angela Torres-Caringal
- Ashley Rivera as Gemmalou Ramos
- John Feir as Salvador "Badong" Ramos
- Jeff Moses as Carlo "Caloy" Gamboa
- Migs Almendras as Brandy Valdez

Guest cast

- Pinky Amador as Soraya
- Klea Pineda as Pia

== Production ==
Principal photography commenced in October 2024 in Tanay, Rizal.

== Ratings ==
According to AGB Nielsen Philippines' Nationwide Urban Television Audience Measurement People in television homes, the pilot episode of Binibining Marikit earned a 6.2% rating. The final episode scored a 5.9% rating.
