= Abot-Kamay na Pangarap =

Philippine television drama series

- Title card
- Also known as: Hands on the Dream
- Genre: Medical drama
- Created by: Geng Delgado
- Written by: Geng Delgado; Lobert Villela; Kenneth Angelo Enriquez; Wiro Michael Ladera
- Directed by: L.A. Madridejos; Jorron Lee Monroy; Paul Sta. Ana
- Creative director: Aloy Adlawan
- Starring: Carmina Villarroel; Jillian Ward
- Theme music composer: Rina Mercado
- Opening theme: "Sagot sa Dalangin" by Maricris Garcia
- Country of origin: Philippines
- Original language: Tagalog
- No. of episodes: 659 (list of episodes)

Production
- Executive producer: Mary Joy Lumboy-Pili
- Camera setup: Multiple-camera setup
- Running time: 22–31 minutes
- Production company: GMA Entertainment Group

Original release
- Network: GMA Network
- Release: September 5, 2022 – October 19, 2024

Abot-Kamay na Pangarap (transl. the dream within reach / international title: Hands on the Dream) is a Philippine television medical drama series broadcast by GMA Network. Directed by L.A. Madridejos, it stars Carmina Villarroel and Jillian Ward. It premiered on September 5, 2022 on the network's Afternoon Prime and Sabado Star Power sa Hapon line up. The series concluded on October 19, 2024, with a total of 659 episodes. It is the longest running drama series of GMA Network, based on episode count.

The series is streaming online on YouTube.

== Premise ==
Mother and daughter, Lyneth and Analyn go through difficulties in life. They both hope, they would meet their dreams and share each other's successes someday. A researcher will find out Analyn's level of intelligence, leading her to study in a medical school.

== Cast and characters ==
Lead cast

- Carmina Villarroel as Lyneth Santos
- Jillian Ward as Analyn Santos

Supporting cast

- Richard Yap as Robert Jose "RJ/Obeng" Tanyag
- Dominic Ochoa as Michael Lobrin
- Pinky Amador as Moira Rutaquio-Tanyag / fake Morgana Go
- Andre Paras as Luke Antonio
- Wilma Doesnt as Josaline "Josa" Enriquez-Valencia
- Kazel Kinouchi as Zoey Tanyag
- Jeff Moses as Reagan Tibayan
- Dexter Doria as Susana "Susan" Burgos
- Chuckie Dreyfus as Raymond "Ray" Meneses
- Ariel Villasanta as Cromwell "Croms" Valencia

Recurring cast

- Denise Barbacena as Eulalia "Eula" Sarmiento
- Patricia Coma as Grace Villar
- Alexandra Mendez as Jhoanne Lery H. Dizon
- John Vic De Guzman as Kenneth "Ken" Prado
- Che Ramos-Cosio as Katherine "Katie" Enriquez
- Eunice Lagusad as Karen Elise G. Caudal
- Alchris Galura as Evan Andrew L. Nicolas
- Anya Gonzalez Almario as Joyce "Joy" Cruz
- Fritzie Aquino as Nerissa Sandoval
- Leo Martinez as Joselito "Pepe" Tanyag
- Dianne dela Fuente as Patricia Menor
- Allen Dizon as Carlos Enrico Benitez
- Dina Bonnevie as Giselle Marie Tanyag
- Ken Chan as Lyndon Ramirez Javier
- Prince Clemente as Neskrist "Krist" Ilustre
- Chanel Latorre as Luningning "Ning" Sandoval
- Sam Pinto as Denise Evangelista
- Raheel Bhyria as Harrison "Harry" Benitez
- Carlo San Juan as Vico Manalastas
- Michael Sager as Mico de Ocampo
- Kirsten Gonzales as Bridgette Lavezares
- Tonton Gutierrez as Eric Refuerzo
- Klea Pineda as Justine Refuerzo
- Marx Topacio as Omar "Dax" Dacanay
- Chrome Prince Cosio as Mark Gonzaga
- Pilar Pilapil as Chantal Dubois vda. de Rutaquio
- Sophia Senoron as Daphne

Guest cast

- Heart Ramos as younger Analyn
- Sophie Albert as Hazel Roces
- Kyle Ocampo as younger Zoey
- Chlaui Malayao as Wendy
- Elia Ilano as younger Grace
- Jenzel Angeles as Sheba
- Alvin Francisco as Alvin
- Winston Tiwaquen as Win
- Jon Lucas as Timothy "Tim" Campos
- Melissa Mendez as Tim's mother
- Ariella Arida as Shamcey
- Joyce Ching as Faith Villar-Castillo
- Shaira Diaz as Olivia "Olive" Garcia
- Jan Marini as Denoy
- Lianne Valentin as Riza
- Anjo Damiles as Oscar
- Betong Sumaya as Obet Villarin
- Zonia Mejia as Jemily Villarin
- Arny Ross as Bea Almasan
- Samantha Lopez as Cherry Mendoza
- Mavy Legaspi as Jordan Mendoza
- Cassy Legaspi as Jewel Mendoza
- Max Collins as Izzy
- Dion Ignacio as Bart
- Pekto as Elmer
- Gabby Eigenmann as Benedicto "Benny" Caballero
- Jamir Zabarte as Darwin Caballero
- Archie Alemania as Lando
- Shanelle Agustin as Jyra
- Ryan Eigenmann as Arman Tinio
- Stanley Abuloc as Toybits
- Sue Prado as Mildred
- Haley Dizon as Cindy
- Crystal Paras as Marga
- Francis Mata as Yamato Hiroshi
- Tess Antonio as Priscilla Ortiz
- Ejay Fontanilla as Arman de Vera
- Gino Ilustre as Timoteo Villarica
- Frances Ignacio as Eleanor Villarica
- Arra San Agustin as Emily
- Angel Leighton as Valeen Ferrer
- Divine Aucina as a flower vendor
- Leanne Bautista as Precious
- Manilyn Reynes as Melba Salazar
- Pauline Mendoza as Katelyn Salazar
- James Marco as Bogs
- Gian Magdangal as Lander Soler
- Thou Reyes as Quinito
- Euwenn Mikaell as Andoy
- Pokwang as herself
- Shayne Sava as younger Giselle
- Abdul Raman as younger Eric
- Brianna Advincula as younger Justine
- Luke Conde as Froilan
- Jackie Lou Blanco as Leticia "Lotus" Madrigal
- Cecil Paz as Bogart
- Lloyd Samartino as Constantino de Leon
- Mia Pangyarihan as Warden Reyes
- Geneva Cruz as Irene Castro-Benitez
- Jem Manicad as Irene's friend
- Jana Trias as Ninang
- Ian Ignacio as Germie
- Elijah Alejo as Carla Madrigal
- Cai Cortez as Joyce
- Gene Padilla as Empoy
- Marcus Madrigal
- Jemwell Ventenilla as Arman
- Ronnie Liang as Maniago
- Shyr Valdez as Violeta "Violy" Reyes
- Ruru Madrid as Elias P. Guerrero / Black Rider
- Empoy Marquez as Oscar "Oka" Santos
- Herlene Budol as Marikit "Pretty" Calaguas
- Alex Medina as Empoy
- Rodjun Cruz as Gabby Cifra
- Joyce Anne Burton as Lara Cecilio
- Mika Salamanca as Emerald Añonuevo
- Pepita Curtis as Kimmy Chika
- Anjay Anson as Tinoy
- Divina Valencia as May
- Eva Darren as Juanita "Juaning" Banaag / Juanita "Nita" Francisco
- Gladys Reyes as real Morgana Go / Nushi G.
- Mark Herras as Gilbert
- Tart Carlos as Olga
- Jess Martinez as Diwata "Diwa" Tibayan
- Caprice Cayetano as Apple Francisco
- Madeleine Nicolas as Apo Binig-an
- MJ Lastimosa as Claire Bermudez
- Ji Soo as Kim Young
- Kenji San Pablo as William "Willy"
- Gilleth Sandico as Roda
- Andrew Gan as Richie

== Development ==
The series was announced in January 2022. The cast of the series was announced in June 2022. In April 2024, actors Ruru Madrid, Empoy Marquez and actress Herlene Budol made an appearance as Elias Guerrero, Oka Santos and Pretty Calaguas respectively, who all originated from the Philippine television action drama series Black Rider.

== Production ==
Principal photography commenced in July 2022. Filming concluded on October 17, 2024.

== Ratings ==
According to AGB Nielsen Philippines' Nationwide Urban Television Audience Measurement People in Television Homes, the pilot episode of Abot-Kamay na Pangarap earned a 6.3% rating. The final episode scored a 9.6% rating. The series had its highest rating on July 29, 2023, with a 13.9% rating.

== Accolades ==
Accolades received by Abot-Kamay na Pangarap
Year	Award	Category	Recipient	Result	Ref.
2023	Platinum Stallion National Media Awards	Television Drama of the Year	Abot-Kamay na Pangarap	Won	
2023	12th Northwest Samar State University Students' Choice Awards for Radio and Television	Best Actress in Daytime Series	Jillian Ward	Won	
2023	12th Northwest Samar State University Students' Choice Awards for Radio and Television	Best Daytime Drama Series	Abot-Kamay na Pangarap	Won	
2023	12th Northwest Samar State University Students' Choice Awards for Radio and Television	Best Supporting Actor in Daytime Series	Richard Yap	Won	
2023	12th Northwest Samar State University Students' Choice Awards for Radio and Television	Best Supporting Actress in Daytime Series	Carmina Villarroel	Won	
2023	45th Catholic Mass Media Awards	Best Drama Series/Program	Abot-Kamay na Pangarap	Special citation	
2024	52nd Box Office Entertainment Awards	Daytime TV Drama Actor of the Year	Richard Yap	Won	
2024	52nd Box Office Entertainment Awards	Daytime TV Drama Actress of the Year	Jillian Ward	Won	
2024	52nd Box Office Entertainment Awards	TV Supporting Actress of the Year	Pinky Amador	Won	
2024	5th VP Choice Awards	TV Series of the Year (Afternoon)	Abot-Kamay na Pangarap	Won	
2024	5th VP Choice Awards	TV Actor of the Year (Afternoon)	Ken Chan	Nominated	
2024	5th VP Choice Awards	TV Actress of the Year (Afternoon)	Jillian Ward	Nominated	
2024	5th VP Choice Awards	TV Supporting Actress of the Year	Kazel Kinouchi	Nominated	
2025	38th PMPC Star Awards for Television	Best Drama Supporting Actress	Pinky Amador	Nominated	
2025	38th PMPC Star Awards for Television	Best Daytime TV Series	Abot-Kamay na Pangarap	Won	
2025	37th PMPC Star Awards for Television	Best Drama Supporting Actress	Pinky Amador	Nominated	
2025	37th PMPC Star Awards for Television	Best Drama Actress	Jillian Ward	Nominated	
2025	37th PMPC Star Awards for Television	Best Daytime TV Series	Abot-Kamay na Pangarap	Won	

== Legacy ==
In September 2023, actress Jillian Ward appeared in the 2023 Philippine television crime drama series Royal Blood in a guest role, portraying the same character she played in Abot-Kamay na Pangarap. In October 2023, actor Richard Yap appeared in the 2023 Philippine television drama series Magandang Dilag in a cameo role. In April 2024, Ward appeared in the Philippine television action drama series Black Rider. In December 2025, Ward appeared in the Philippine television drama series Hating Kapatid.
