= Hating Kapatid (TV series) =

Philippine television drama series

- Title card
- Also known as: Stolen Bonds
- Genre: Drama
- Written by: Luningning Ribay; Maria Christina Velasco; Renato Custodio; Wiro Michael Ladera; Jai Shane Cañete
- Directed by: Adolf Alix Jr.
- Creative director: Aloy Adlawan
- Starring: Carmina Villarroel; Zoren Legaspi; Mavy Legaspi; Cassy Legaspi
- Country of origin: Philippines
- Original language: Tagalog
- No. of episodes: 129

Production
- Executive producer: Arlene Del Rosario-Pilapil
- Production locations: Atok, Benguet
- Running time: 23–33 minutes
- Production company: GMA Entertainment Group

Original release
- Network: GMA Network
- Release: October 13, 2025 – March 21, 2026

Hating Kapatid (transl. sibling divide / international title: Stolen Bonds) is a Philippine television drama series broadcast by GMA Network. Directed by Adolf Alix Jr., it stars Carmina Villarroel, Zoren Legaspi, Cassy Legaspi and Mavy Legaspi. It premiered on October 13, 2025 on the network's Afternoon Prime line up. The series concluded on March 21, 2026, with a total of 129 episodes.

The series is streaming online on YouTube.

== Cast and characters ==
Cast

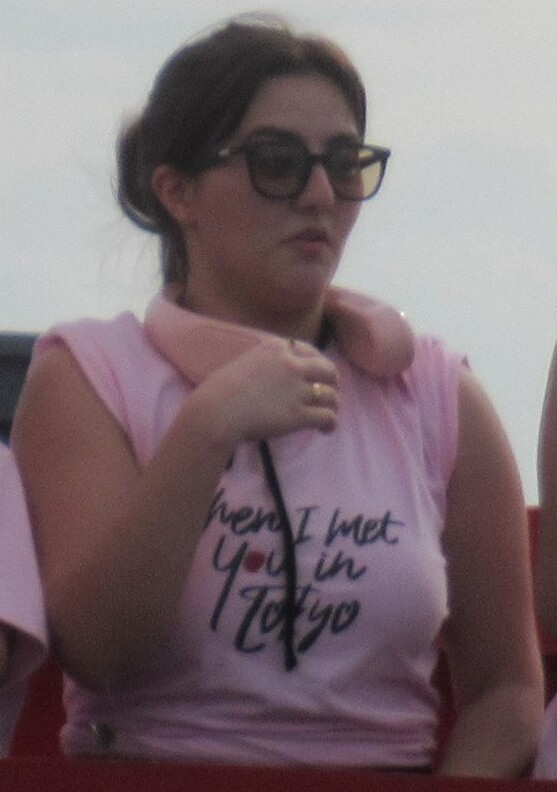
Cassy Legaspi

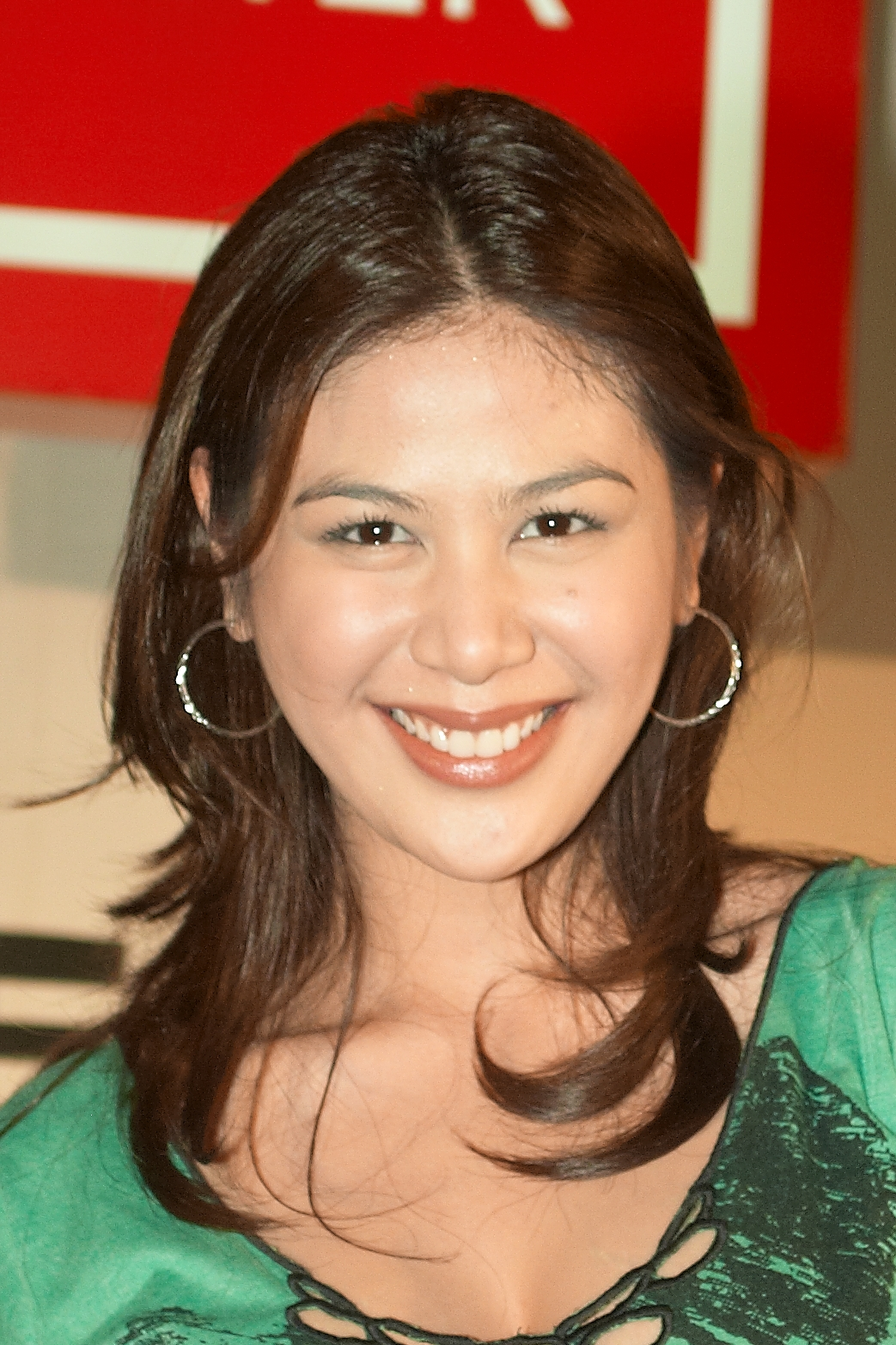
Valerie Concepcion

Lead cast

- Carmina Villarroel as Roselle
- Zoren Legaspi as Cris
- Mavy Legaspi as Tyrone
- Cassy Legaspi as Belle

Supporting cast

- Valerie Concepcion as Via
- Bobby Andrews
- Lovely Rivero
- Chuckie Dreyfus
- Faye Lorenzo
- Vince Maristela as Wesley
- Cheska Fausto as Thalia
- Hayley Dizon as Zinnia
- Glenda Garcia as Jacinta
- Mel Kimura
- Leandro Baldemor as Darius
- Mercedes Cabral as Melania

Guest cast

- Euwenn Mikaell as younger Tyrone
- Juharra Asayo as younger Thalia
- Jillian Ward as Analyn Santos
- Ashley Ortega as Angel

== Development ==
The series and its cast members were announced in March 2025. In December 2025, actress Jillian Ward made a cameo appearance, Analyn Santos, who originated from the Philippine television medical drama series Abot-Kamay na Pangarap.

== Ratings ==
According to AGB Nielsen Philippines' Nationwide Urban Television Audience Measurement People in television homes, the pilot episode of Hating Kapatid earned a 5.6% rating. The final episode scored a 5.5% rating.
