= Analyn Santos =

Fictional character in Abot-Kamay na Pangarap

- Abot-Kamay na Pangarap character
- Jillian Ward as Analyn Santos in Abot-Kamay na Pangarap
- First appearance: World Premiere (Episode #1; Pilot)
- Last appearance: Naabot na Pangarap (Episode #659; Finale) (Note: transl. A Dream Within Reach)
- Created by: Geng Delgado
- Portrayed by: Heart Ramos (young); Jillian Ward (adult)

In-universe information
- Species: Human
- Gender: Female
- Occupation: Medical surgeon
- Family: Lyneth Santos (mother); Robert Jose Tanyag (biological father)
- Relatives: Zoey Tanyag (half-sister)
- Nationality: Filipino

Analyn Santos is a fictional character from the GMA Network medical drama television series, Abot-Kamay na Pangarap. She is portrayed by Heart Ramos as a young girl and by Jillian Ward as she grows older. The series tells the story of a teenage prodigy who becomes one of the world's top neurosurgeons. Santos is depicted as a loving and exceptionally genius, persevering, feisty, wise, and kind, daughter of Lyneth Santos, a woman who was unable to pursue formal education.

== Character background ==
Analyn grew up poor, raised by a sickly, illiterate mother. She finished high school at 12 and medical school by 19, becoming the youngest surgical resident at APEX Medical Hospital. Many of her colleagues felt threatened by how young and skilled she was, which made her job difficult. She stopped working at the hospital for a time because of the difficulties she faced. When her father fell ill with a rare brain disease, she returned to take care of him. Analyn is skilled and determined, but she deals with challenges both in her job and in her life.

== Media appearances ==
Analyn has appeared beyond Abot-Kamay na Pangarap, making guest appearances in other television series. In September 2023, she reprised her role in the crime drama Royal Blood. In April 2024, Ward brought the character to the action drama series Black Rider.
