= Sparkle GMA Artist Center =

Talent agency division of GMA Network

Sparkle
- Logo used since 2022
- Formerly: GMA Artist Center (1995–2021)
- Type: Division
- Industry: Talent agency
- Founded: August 12, 1995; 31 years ago
- Headquarters: GMA Network Center, Diliman, Quezon City, Philippines
- Area served: Nationwide (Metro Manila and suburbs)
- Key people: Atty. Annette Gozon-Valdes (SVP for Talent Management); Joy C. Marcelo (first vice president for Sparkle, GMA Artist Center); Tracy Garcia (Senior Talent Manager)
- Products: Music & entertainment
- Services: Talent management
- Parent: GMA Network Inc.
- Website: www.gmanetwork.com/sparkle

Sparkle (stylized in all caps, formerly known as GMA Artist Center, also formally as GMA Talent Development and Management Department and Sparkle GMA Artist Center) is the talent agency owned by GMA Network Inc. based in Quezon City, Philippines that was founded on August 12, 1995.

== History ==
=== GMA Artist Center ===
GMA Artist Center or GMAAC conducted several auditions prior to launching its first batch of talents in 1998. It also launched the "Metropop Star Search" from 1996 to 1998 where winners automatically became part of GMAAC. It was originally headed by veteran talent manager Wyngard Tracy until 2000. When Felipe Gozon took over as GMA Network's president and CEO in 2000, the Artist Center was placed under the network's Entertainment Division led by Wilma Galvante. In 2003, GMAAC hired Ida Henares as their newest head. Under her leadership, GMAAC launched the reality artista search Starstruck which became the main launching pad for most star hopefuls since then. In 2007, GMA Artist Center invoked the exclusivity clause. For 2011, GMA Artist Center's slogan was "Making Stars Shine".

In 2013, Henares retired from her position. In 2014, Simoun Ferrer and Gigi Santiago-Lara became the new heads of GMAAC. During their tenure until present day, GMAAC experienced growth and increased popularity, with most of its artists being given recognition here and abroad. On July 13, 2021, former Star Magic Chairman Emeritus Johnny Manahan signed up as GMAAC consultant. On September 5, 2021, GMAAC organized "Signed for Stardom", a digital multi-platform event where current and new talents were signed up and introduced to the public.

GMAAC provides models for various endorsements, and actors for projects of Philippine television, music, and film industry.

=== Sparkle ===
On December 31, 2021, during GMA Network's New Year's Eve special, it was announced that the agency had been renamed "Sparkle": the rebranding was stated to be an effort to "reinvigorate" the agency. It also launched its theme song, "Let It Spark", which is sung by Psalms David, XOXO, and Thea Astley, on February 8, 2022. Senior Vice President Atty. Annette Gozon-Valdes was appointed as the Head of Sparkle.

== Batches ==
=== Sparkle era ===
==== Sparkle's Next Brightest Stars of 2022 ====
Along with the launch in 2022, Sparkle reintroduced 8 artists from its roster, dubbed as the "Sparkle's Next Brightest Stars".

- Bianca Umali
- Ysabel Ortega
- Gabbi Garcia
- Sanya Lopez
- Khalil Ramos
- Derrick Monasterio
- Miguel Tanfelix
- Ruru Madrid

==== Sparkle Sweethearts ====
In February 2022, 5 pairs of new and existing young love teams were launched as the "Sparkle Sweethearts".

- Kyline Alcantara and Mavy Legaspi (until 2023)
- Sofia Pablo and Allen Ansay
- Althea Ablan and Bruce Roeland (until 2022)
- Shayne Sava and Abdul Raman
- Zonia Mejia and Jamir Zabarte

==== Sparkada ====
In April 2022, Sparkle first introduced onscreen a new roster of talents, collectively named as the "Sparkada", on the weekly variety show, All-Out Sundays. The group consists of 17 young artists.

- Caitlyn Stave
- Vanessa Pena
- Roxie Smith
- Dilek Montemayor
- Kirsten Gonzales
- Cheska Fausto
- Lauren King
- Tanya Ramos
- Vince Maristela
- Raheel Bhyria
- Larkin Castor
- Jeff Moses
- Sean Lucas
- Saviour Ramos
- Kim Perez
- Anjay Anson
- Michael Sager

==== Sparkle Teens ====
In April 2023, a new batch of 19 teenage artists debuted as the "Sparkle Teens". Prior to their launch, the batch originally had 20 talents, until the death of one of the members, Andrei Sison, due to a vehicular accident in March 2023.

- Charlie Fleming
- Ashley Sarmiento
- Keisha Serna
- Gaea Mischa
- Selina Griffin
- Naomi Park
- Liana Mae
- Aya Domingo
- Princess Aliyah
- John Clifford
- Lee Victor
- James Graham
- Anton Vinzon
- Aidan Veneracion
- Josh Ford
- Bryce Eusebio
- Marco Masa
- Zyren Dela Cruz
- Waynona Collings
- Andrei Sison† (deceased)

==== Sparkle 10 ====
On the peek before Valentine's Day, Sparkle introduced and showcased 10 Young, Current and Upcoming Actresses, collectively named as the "Sparkle 10".

- Faith da Silva
- Rabiya Mateo
- Ashley Ortega
- Lianne Valentin
- Shuvee Etrata
- Lexi Gonzales
- Angel Guardian
- Liezel Lopez
- Kate Valdez
- Elle Villanueva
- Sofia Jahrling
- Bella Racelis

==== Sparkle Boys of Summer ====
On April 16, 2024, On the Peek this Summer. The blazing summer heat just got hotter with Sparkle GMA Artist Center's recently released summer campaign video, which features the "Sparkle Boys of Summer".

- Vince Maristela
- Raheel Bhyria
- Kelvin Miranda
- Bruce Roeland
- Radson Flores
- Royce Cabrera
- Prince Carlos
- Matthew Uy
- Yasser Marta
- Dustin Yu
- Jeff Moses
- Mclaude Guadaña
