= List of Inagaw na Bituin episodes =

Inagaw na Bituin (Lit: Taken Star / English: Written in the Stars) is a 2019 Philippine musical drama television series starring Kyline Alcantara and Therese Malvar. The series premiered on GMA Network's GMA Afternoon Prime block and worldwide on GMA Pinoy TV from February 11, 2019 to May 17, 2019, replacing Ika-5 Utos.

NUTAM (Nationwide Urban Television Audience Measurement) People in Television Homes ratings are provided by AGB Nielsen Philippines. The series ended, but its the 14th-week run, and with 68 episodes. It was replaced by Dahil sa Pag-ibig.

== Series overview ==
Month	Episodes	Monthly averages
Month	Episodes	NUTAM
February 2019	14	6.4%
March 2019	21	6.3%
April 2019	20	5.1%
May 2019	13	4.4%
Total	68	5.6%

== Episodes ==
=== February 2019 ===
Episode		Original air date	Social media hashtag	AGB Nielsen NUTAM People in Television Homes		Ref.
Episode		Original air date	Social media hashtag	Rating	Timeslot rank	Ref.
1	"Pilot"	February 11, 2019	#InagawNaBituin	6.1%	#1	
2	"The Proposal"	February 12, 2019	#INBTheProposal	6.3%	#2	
3	"Kasalo" (Share)	February 13, 2019	#INBKasalo	6.4%	#1	
4	"Inggitan" (Envy)	February 14, 2019	#INBInggitan	6.1%	#1	
5	"Kidnapped"	February 15, 2019	#INBKidnapped	6.3%	#2	
6	"Pagbawi" (Redemption)	February 18, 2019	#INBPagbawi	6.5%	#1	
7	"Elsa"	February 19, 2019	#INBElsa	6.4%	#1	
8	"On the Run"	February 20, 2019	#INBOnTheRun	6.0%	#2	
9	"Paglayo" (Departure)	February 21, 2019	#INBPaglayo	6.1%	#2	
10	"Pagmamahal" (Love)	February 22, 2019	#INBPagmamahal	7.0%	#1	
11	"Pagkikita" (Meeting)	February 25, 2019	#INBPagkikita	7.2%	#1	
12	"Anna is Elsa"	February 26, 2019	#INBAnnaIsElsa	6.4%	#2	
13	"Hiling ni Belinda" (Belinda's Request)	February 27, 2019	#INBHilingNiBelinda	6.6%	#1	
14	"Confession"	February 28, 2019	#INBConfession	6.0%	#2	

=== March 2019 ===
Episode		Original air date	Social media hashtag	AGB Nielsen NUTAM People in Television Homes		Ref.
Episode		Original air date	Social media hashtag	Rating	Timeslot rank	Ref.
15	"Audition"	March 1, 2019	#INBAudition	6.7%	#1	
16	"Litrato" (Picture)	March 4, 2019	#INBLitrato	6.0%	#2	
17	"Pag-asa" (Hope)	March 5, 2019	#INBPagAsa	5.9%	#2	
18	"Spotlight"	March 6, 2019	#INBSpotlight	6.1%	#2	
19	"Banggaan" (Clash)	March 7, 2019	#INBBanggaan	5.8%	#2	
20	"Paghaharap" (Confrontation)	March 8, 2019	#INBPaghaharap	6.4%	#1	
21	"Target Elsa"	March 11, 2019	#INBTargetElsa	6.3%	#2	
22	"Pagtulong" (Helping)	March 12, 2019	#INBPagtulong	6.3%	#2	
23	"Secret"	March 13, 2019	#INBSecret	6.2%	#2	
24	"Guilty"	March 14, 2019	#INBGulity	6.1%	#2	
25	"Proof"	March 15, 2019	#INBProof	6.0%	#2	
26	"Challenge"	March 18, 2019	#INBChallenge	6.0%	#2	
27	"Viral"	March 19, 2019	#INBViral	6.6%	#2	
28	"Confessions"	March 20, 2019	#INBConfessions	6.9%	#2	
29	"Revelation"	March 21, 2019	#INBRevelation	7.0%	#2	
30	"Rivalry"	March 22, 2019	#INBRivalry	6.3%	#2	
31	"Adopted"	March 25, 2019	#INBAdopted	6.1%	#2	
32	"Confirmation"	March 26, 2019	#INBConfirmation	6.5%	#2	
33	"Elsa's Return"	March 27, 2019	#INBElsasReturn	6.3%	#2	
34	"Trahedya" (Tragedy)	March 28, 2019	#INBTrahedya	6.4%	#2	
35	"Kapatid" (Sibling)	March 29, 2019	#INBKapatid	6.0%	#2	

=== April 2019 ===
Episode		Original air date	Social media hashtag	AGB Nielsen NUTAM People in Television Homes		Ref.
Episode		Original air date	Social media hashtag	Rating	Timeslot rank	Ref.
36	"Paalam, Melody" (Goodbye, Melody)	April 1, 2019	#INBPaalamMelody	5.8%	#1	
37	"Salarin" (Culprit)	April 2, 2019	#INBSalarin	5.1%	#1	
38	"Pakiusap" (Beg)	April 3, 2019	#INBPakiusap	4.2%	#2	
39	"Torn"	April 4, 2019	#INBTorn	4.1%	#2	
40	"Decisions"	April 5, 2019	#INBDecisions	5.4%	#2	
41	"Tiwala" (Trust)	April 8, 2019	#INBTiwala	5.5%	#2	
42	"Kulong" (Jail)	April 9, 2019	#INBKulong	5.3%	#2	
43	"Enough"	April 10, 2019	#INBEnough	5.6%	#2	
44	"Pakikipagbati" (Reconciliation)	April 11, 2019	#INBPakikipagbati	5.4%	#2	
45	"Captive"	April 12, 2019	#INBCaptive	5.3%	#2	
46	"Sakripisyo" (Sacrifice)	April 15, 2019	#INBSakripisyo	4.6%	#2	
47	"Escape"	April 16, 2019	#INBEscape	4.3%	#2	
48	"Huling Pakiusap" (Final Beg)	April 17, 2019	#INBHulingPakiusap	5.0%	#2	
49	"Takas" (Escape)	April 22, 2019	#INBTakas	5.0%	#2	
50	"Gunshot"	April 23, 2019	#INBGunshot	5.9%	#2	
51	"Family"	April 24, 2019	#INBFamily	5.3%	#2	
52	"Hanapin si Belinda" (Find Belinda)	April 25, 2019	#INBHanapinSiBelinda	4.9%	#2	
53	"Walang Iwanan" (Without Leaving)	April 26, 2019	#INBWalangIwanan	4.0%	#2	
54	"Pasukuin si Lucy" (Giving Up Lucy)	April 29, 2019	#INBPasukuinSiLucy	4.9%	#2	
55	"Cornered"	April 30, 2019	#INBCornered	5.9%	#2	

=== May 2019 ===
Episode		Original air date	Social media hashtag	AGB Nielsen NUTAM People in Television Homes		Ref.
Episode		Original air date	Social media hashtag	Rating	Timeslot rank	Ref.
56	"Awa ng Ina" (Mother's Pity)	May 1, 2019	#INBAwaNgIna	6.0%	#2	
57	"Sigaw" (Shout)	May 2, 2019	#INBSigaw	6.0%	#2	
58	"Buong Pamilya" (Whole Family)	May 3, 2019	#INBBuongPamilya	6.3%	#2	
59	"Higanti" (Revenge)	May 6, 2019	#INBHiganti	5.2%	#2	
60	"Pakikipaglaban" (Fighting)	May 7, 2019	#INBPakikipaglaban	3.8%	#2	
61	"Plano" (Plan)	May 8, 2019	#INBPlano	3.7%	#2	
62	"Pagbabalik" (Comeback)	May 9, 2019	#INBPagbabalik	3.3%	#2	
63	"Kidnap"	May 10, 2019	#INBKidnap	3.0%	#2	
64	"Saving Anna"	May 13, 2019	#INBSavingAnna	—N/a		
65	"Kapalit" (Replacement)	May 14, 2019	#INBKapalit	2.9%	#2	
66	"Rescue Operation"	May 15, 2019	#INBRescueOperation	3.7%	#2	
67	"Tutukan" (Point)	May 16, 2019	#INBTutukan	4.1%	#2	
68	"Finale"	May 17, 2019	#INBFinale	4.7%	#2	
