= San Juanico Bridge =

Third longest bridge in the Philippines, connecting Leyte and Samar

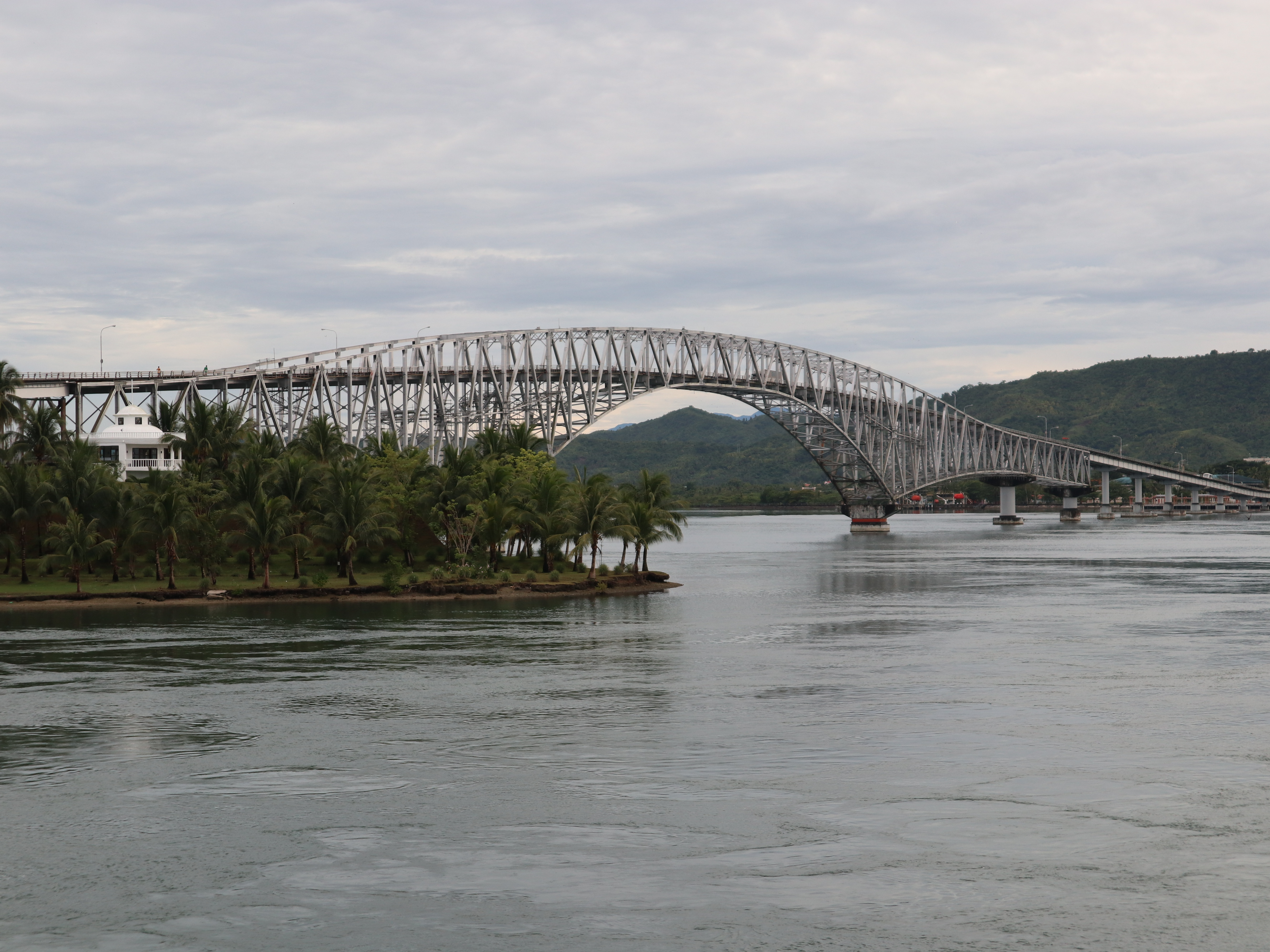
- The bridge in 2022
- Coordinates: 11°18′10″N 124°58′19″E
- Carries: 2 lanes of AH26 (Maharlika Highway); pedestrian sidewalks
- Crosses: San Juanico Strait
- Locale: Santa Rita, Samar and Tacloban City
- Other name(s): Philippine-Japan Friendship Highway bridge; formerly Marcos Bridge
- Maintained by: Department of Public Works and Highways

Characteristics
- Design: Arch-shaped truss bridge
- Total length: 2,164 m (7,100 ft)
- Width: 14 m (46 ft)
- Longest span: 192 m (630 ft)
- No. of spans: 43
- Load limit: 15 Tons

History
- Constructed by: Construction and Development Corporation of the Philippines
- Construction start: 1969
- Construction end: 1973
- Construction cost: US$22 million (₱154 million)
- Opened: 2 July 1973; 53 years ago

Location
- Interactive map of San Juanico Bridge

The San Juanico Bridge (Filipino: Tulay ng San Juanico; Waray: Tulay han San Juanico) is part of the Pan-Philippine Highway and stretches from Samar to Leyte across the San Juanico Strait in the Philippines. It is located by the Municipality of Santa Rita, Samar, and the City of Tacloban. Its longest length is a steel girder viaduct built on reinforced concrete piers, and its main span is of an arch-shaped truss design. Constructed during the administration of President Ferdinand Marcos through Japanese Official Development Assistance loans, it has a total length of 2.16 kilometers (1.34 mi)—the third longest bridge spanning a body of seawater in the Philippines after the Cebu–Cordova Link Expressway and Panguil Bay Bridge. It was also the longest bridge in the Philippines upon its opening in 1973, surpassed in 1976 by Candaba Viaduct of North Luzon Expressway (NLEX), another bridge that connects from one province to another, connecting the provinces of Pampanga and Bulacan.

The bridge has helped bolster economic activity in Samar and Leyte and has become an iconic tourist attraction.

== History ==
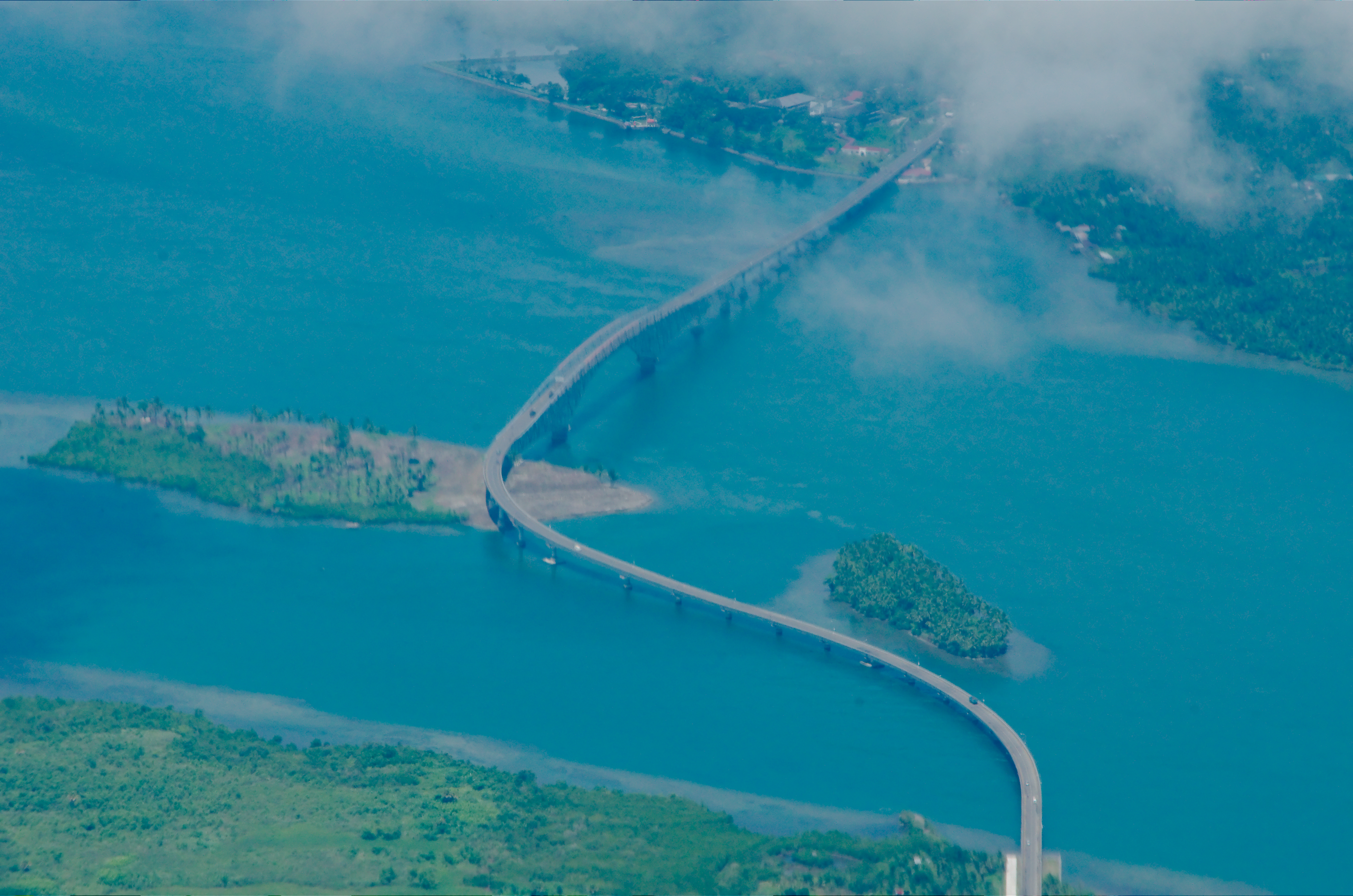
Aerial view over San Juanico Strait.

=== Development ===
==== Inception ====
The "Philippine-Japan Friendship Highway Bridge" was part of a large bundle of high-visibility foreign-loan-funded infrastructure launched by then-Philippine President Ferdinand Marcos' administration during the 1969 presidential election campaign.

At the time the project was conceived, there was not yet much traffic between the islands of Leyte and Samar because they were relatively underdeveloped, and as a result, the construction of the bridge was not seen as economically viable, but was nonetheless funded by foreign loans that would charge interest.

==== Financing ====
The Philippine-Japan Friendship Highway project started out in the mid-1960s with a single US$25 million Japan Export-Import Bank loan meant for the purchase of equipment for road development. However, the Philippine government requested its expansion to incorporate a bridge between Leyte and Samar, and various sea traffic projects such as roll-on/roll-off ferries.

The cost of the construction was US$22 million (about ₱154 million in the 1970s), which was acquired through Official Development Assistance loans from Japan's Overseas Technical Cooperation Agency (OTCA), the predecessor of today's Japan International Cooperation Agency (JICA). This was the first Official Development Assistance from Japan to the Philippines through JICA.

==== Contract awarding ====
Through the Ministry of Public Highways, the Philippine government contracted the San Juanico Bridge project to the Construction and Development Corporation of the Philippines (CDCP; now the Philippine National Construction Corporation), a company founded by close Marcos associate Rodolfo Cuenca.

==== Construction ====
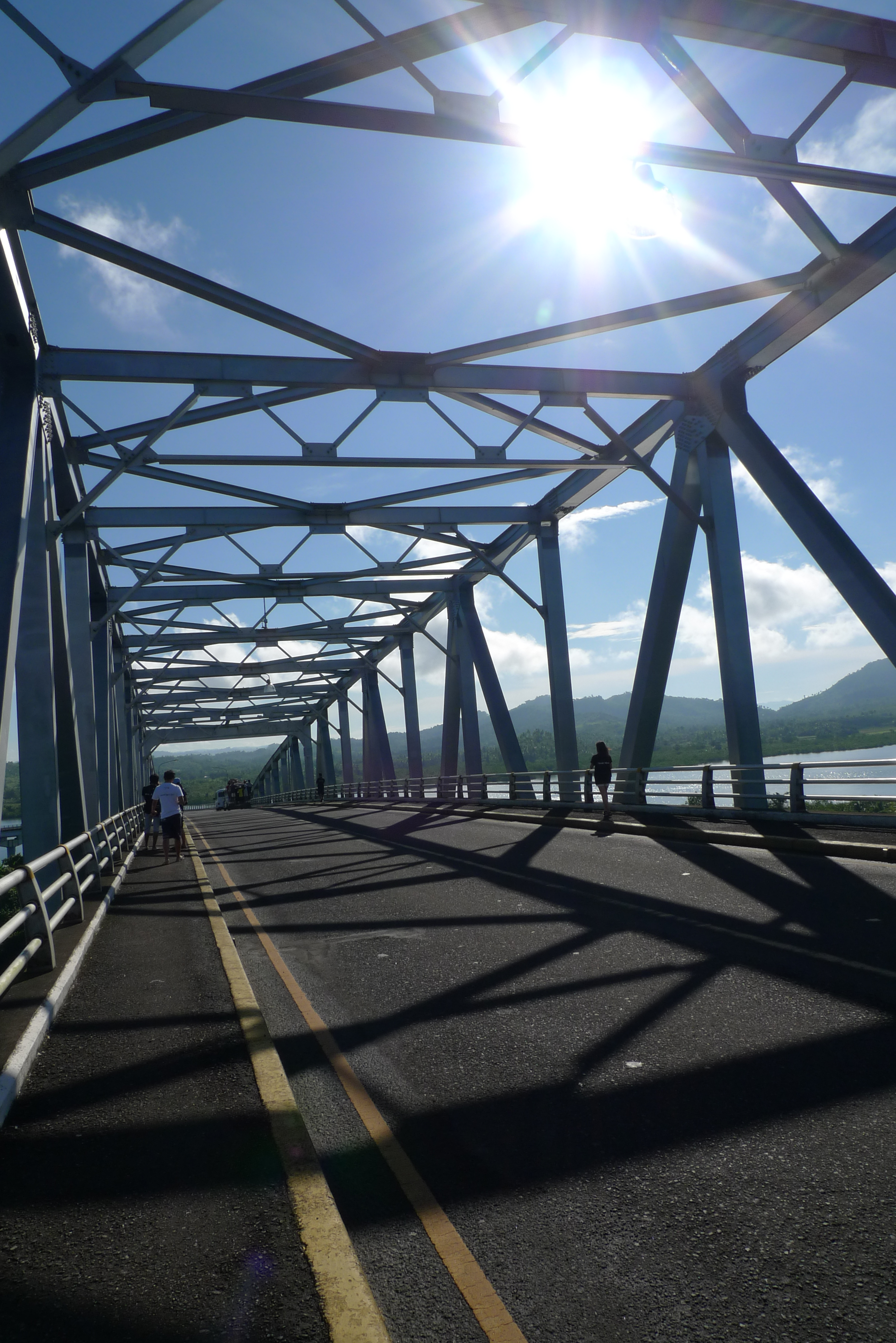
Inside the bridge's main span

Construction of the bridge commenced during 1969 presidential campaign. It was finally completed four years later, in 1973, and was inaugurated on 2 July, coinciding with the birthday of then-First Lady Imelda Marcos, a native of Leyte.

The bridge's design reflected the aesthetic of other infrastructure projects associated with what has been called the Marcoses' "edifice complex"—described by architectural historian Gerard Lico as "an obsession and compulsion to build edifices as a hallmark of greatness".

=== Post-construction ===
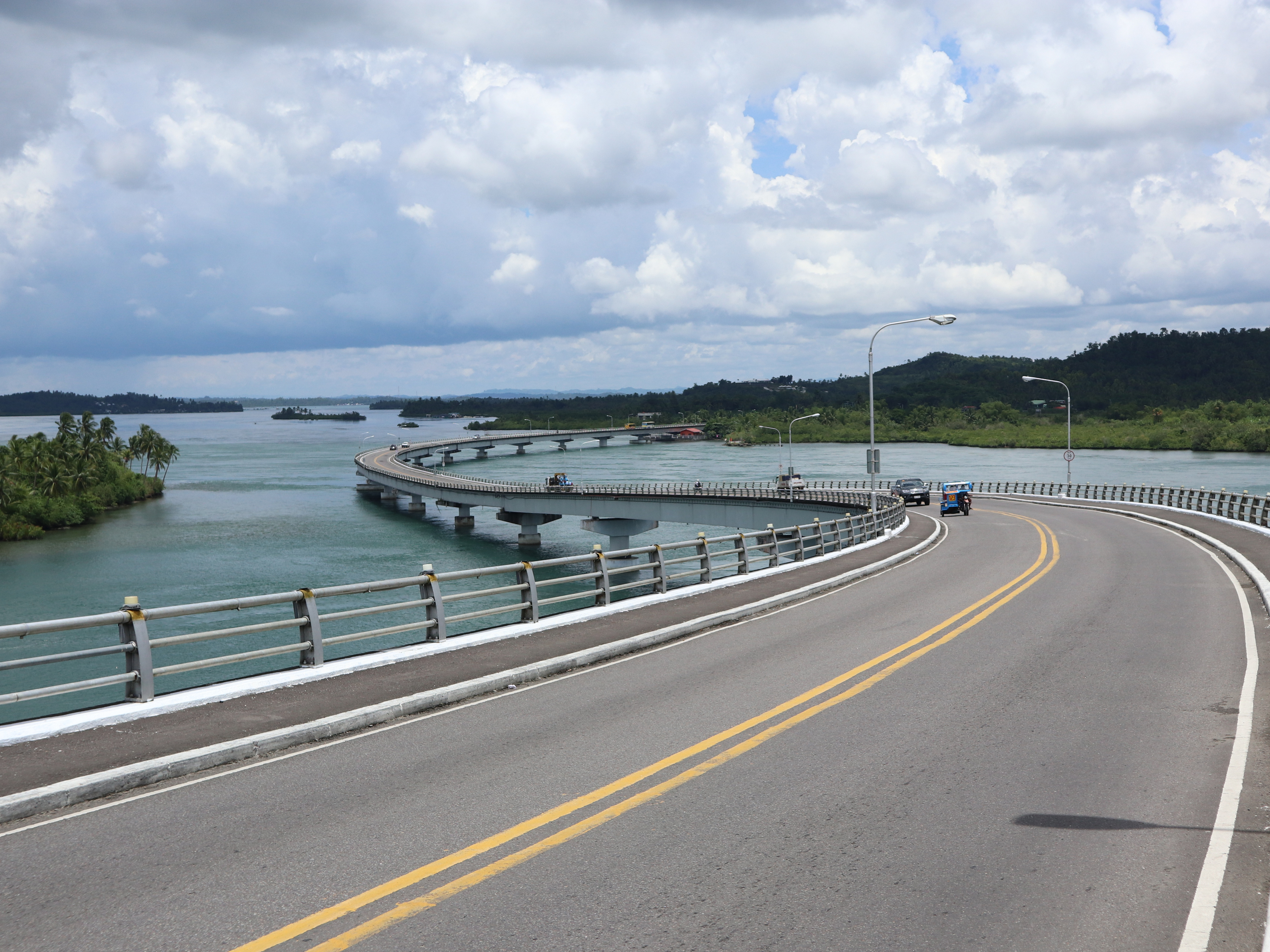
San Juanico Bridge in 2022

According to former National Economic and Development Authority deputy director Ruperto Alonzo, the project was initially criticised as a white elephant that was "a possession that is useless and expensive to maintain or difficult to dispose of", because its average daily traffic was too low to justify the cost of its construction. As a result, its construction has been associated with what has been called the Marcoses' "edifice complex".

In the years after the bridge's construction, economic activity in Samar and Leyte has finally caught up with the bridge's intended function, and has become an iconic tourist attraction.

The bridge was slightly damaged by Typhoon Haiyan, locally known as Super Typhoon Yolanda, in November 2013 but was quickly repaired and reopened within the month.

The Samar provincial government proposed a project to install LED lights in the bridge, with timed lighting effects for select occasions as an effort to boost tourism between Leyte and Samar islands. The ₱80 million project dubbed as the San Juanico Bridge Lighting Project was approved by the Tourism Infrastructure and Enterprise Zone Authority in January 2018. The implementation of the lighting project has experienced delays. The groundbreaking for the project took place on 26 July 2019, with completion projected for December 2019 or January 2020. The completion of the project however has been delayed. The bridge was successfully lit up for the first time on 20 October 2022.

In May 2025, the DPWH imposed a 3-ton axle load limit on the San Juanico Bridge due to structural concerns. RORO routes were used as alternatives. Pedestrians were banned from crossing the bridge and would be ferried by light vehicles instead. The partial closure prompted the declaration of states of emergency in Samar Province on May 20 and in Tacloban on May 29, and fuel shortages in parts of Samar Island. On May 21, Department of Public Works and Highways secretary Manuel Bonoan announced plans to build a longer bridge measuring 2.6 kilometers near the San Juanico Bridge that would be funded through official development assistance from Japan. The National Disaster Risk Reduction and Management Council estimated that repairs on the bridge would cost approximately P7 billion, while monthly economic losses from its partial closure could reach up to P600 million. On June 5, President Bongbong Marcos declared a state of calamity in Eastern Visayas due to the repairs. The bridge was reopened to vehicles with a weight not exceeding 15 tons in December 2025.

== Features ==
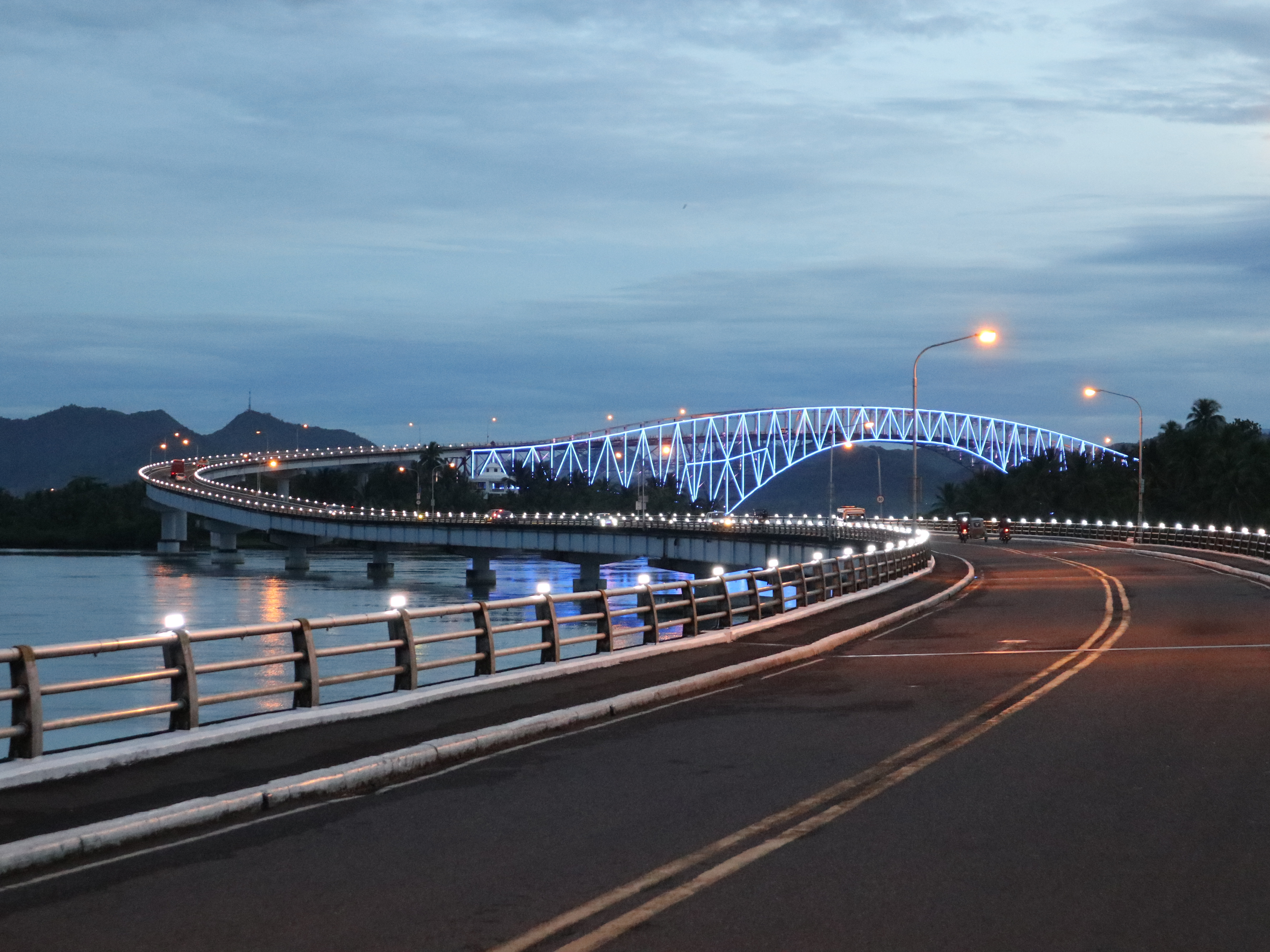
San Juanico Bridge in 2022 with the new LED lights installed

The San Juanico Bridge connects the islands of Leyte and Samar by linking the city of Tacloban in Leyte to the town of Santa Rita in Samar. It passes over the San Juanico Strait. The road infrastructure is the third longest bridge spanning a body of seawater in the Philippines after the Cebu–Cordova Link Expressway and the Panguil Bay Bridge, measuring 2,164 m (7,100 ft) in total length. It has 43 steel spans with the primary span measuring 192 m (630 ft).

The bridge's abutments are founded on steel H-piles while its piers are rock seated pedestals built using the Prepakt method, having single cylindrical shafts and tapered cantilevered copings.

The bridge is part of the Pan–Philippine Highway (commonly known as the Maharlika Highway), a network of roads, bridges, and sea routes that connect the islands of Luzon, Samar, Leyte, and Mindanao in the country. The highway was proposed in 1965, and constructed as part to serve as the country's backbone of transportation.

== Economic significance ==
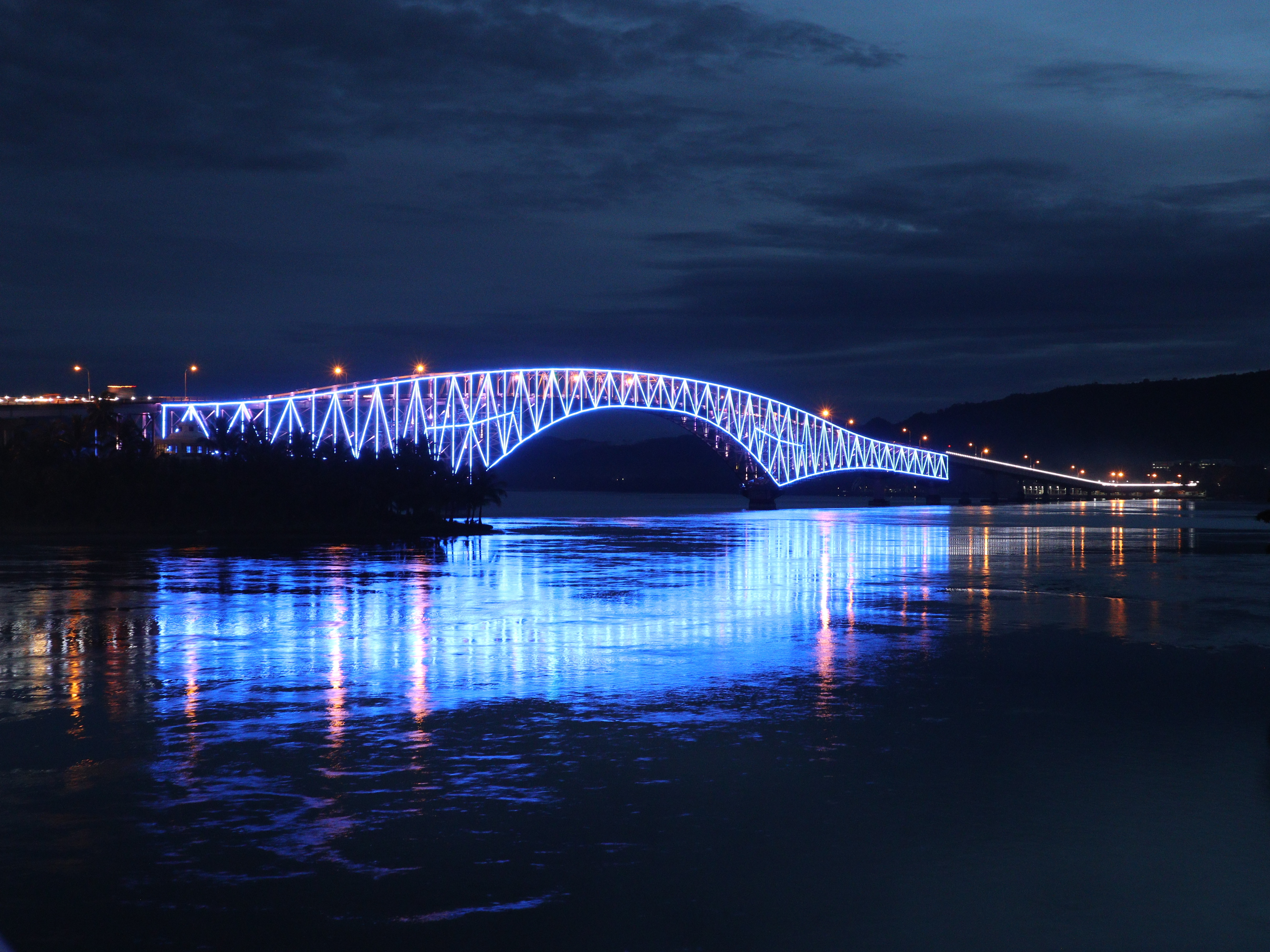
San Juanico Bridge in 2022

Nicknamed the "Bridge of Love", San Juanico is considered a major tourist destination of the locale especially the city of Tacloban. Tourists riding buses and jeepneys are allowed to alight in the middle of the bridge. Group tours are also organized. Boat tours have also been organized to give tourists a view of the bridge while at sea.

The San Juanico Bridge also serves as an important role for both the tourism and economies of the islands of Samar and Leyte by linking them which also relies on their respective agriculture industries.

== In popular culture ==
=== Martial Law slang ===
During martial law in the Philippines under then-president Ferdinand Marcos, military personnel who conducted tortures referred to one particular method of torture as "the San Juanico Bridge". It involved a person being beaten while the victim's head and feet lay on separate beds and the body is suspended as though to form a bridge.

=== Film and literature ===
Filipino actor and stunt performer Dante Varona jumped from the San Juanico Bridge without a harness in the 1981 movie Hari ng Stunt.

The short story "The Bridge" by Yvette Tan is based on one of the urban legends surrounding the San Juanico Bridge. The story won an award for fiction from the Philippine Graphic.

=== Urban legends ===
There are a number of urban legends associated with the bridge's construction. The most popular one involves a woman overseeing the project who follows a fortune teller's advice and orders workers to mix children's blood with the bridge's foundation. A river fairy curses the woman and causes the woman to grow foul-smelling scales on her legs.

== Incidents ==
- On 22 September 2002, a barge rammed into a concrete foundation of the bridge causing ₱25-million in damage. Then, in October, a portion of the bridge slid down by at least 10 centimeters after a metal support for its concrete foundation gave way, which was attributed by Engineer Jimmy Chan to "material fatigue".

== See also ==
- List of longest bridges
