= Rodolfo Cuenca =

Filipino businessman (1928–2023)

- Born: May 1, 1928; Manila, Philippine Islands
- Died: October 2023 (aged 95)
- Occupation: Businessman
- Known for: Chairman of the Construction and Development Corporation of the Philippines (CDCP)

Rodolfo Cuenca (May 1, 1928 – October 2023), sometimes known by his nickname, Rudy Cuenca, was a Filipino businessman best known as the chairman of the Construction and Development Corporation of the Philippines (CDCP), which is known today as the Philippine National Construction Corporation. He was a close associate of Ferdinand Marcos, and was noted not to be embarrassed by "his much-criticized close association with Marcos and his being tagged as a crony."

== Early life and education ==
Rodolfo Cuenca was born on May 1, 1928, at the Philippine General Hospital in Manila, to Nicolas and Cristina Cuenca. He was the eldest among four children. Cuenca spent his early years in Vigan, as his father was assigned as district engineer in Ilocos Sur. In 1937, the family transferred to Bulacan, where Cuenca finished his fourth and fifth grade. He continued sixth grade in Ateneo de Manila on Padre Faura Street, then transferred to the Intramuros campus for his seventh grade.

During the Second World War, Cuenca withdrew from high school and worked some jobs, one of which was at the General Engineering Depot for the US Army in Malolos, Bulacan. In 1946, he returned to Ateneo to finish high school. He then enrolled at the Far Eastern University to study commerce, but soon dropped out to work as a road contractor. On 2 January 1948, he married Yasmin Santos, whom Cuenca met in Angat, Bulacan.

== Association with Ferdinand Marcos ==
Cuenca financially donated to Ferdinand Marcos' first presidential campaign in 1965. In his second year of presidency, Marcos awarded large-scale projects to Cuenca's company, Cuenca Construction Company, which later became part of the Construction and Development Corporation of the Philippines (CDCP). Under the Republic Act (RA) 3741, private contractors were allowed to bid for government infrastructure projects. In 1967, the CDCP won government contracts to build the Manila North and South Expressways, valued at just over $16 million. The company maintained its favored treatment until the early 1980s, for the benefit of Cuenca and Marcos, both of whom allegedly "divided and funneled commissions" and kickbacks into their own pockets.

According to Cuenca, it was in also in 1967 when he started joining Marcos to play golf, along with Robert "Bobby" Benedicto, the latter's classmate in UP Law School, and the former's close friend since the 1950s. These frequent golf sessions would continue well into the Martial Law era. For Marcos' re-election campaign in 1969, Cuenca again played the role of fundraiser.

== Tenure as CDCP Chairman ==
Cuenca's chairmanship of the CDCP began in 1967, and lasted until 1983. It was during this period that Cuenca acquired much of his wealth, properties, and companies. Between these years, CDCP experienced a rapid rise of profits, mainly through what critics called "bloated" government contracts. These profits then suddenly plummeted, due to accumulation of government debts and unnecessary expenses.

=== CDCP Projects ===
Cuenca's company was involved with many projects, which were constructed at the behest of Ferdinand Marcos and his wife, Imelda Marcos. These included the Manila North and South Luzon Expressways, the San Juanico Bridge, Imelda Marcos' Manila Bay Reclamation Project, and the Light Rail Transit (LRT).

==== Manila North and South Luzon Expressways ====
The first major government contract that the CDCP was awarded were for the construction of Manila North and South Luzon Expressways. By the end of 1968, the first phase of the Manila North Luzon Expressway (NLEX) was open to the public, the road measuring 28 kilometers towards Guiginto Bulacan from Balintawak. In the same year of 1968, construction for the Manila South Luzon Expressway (SLEX) began. The initial 16-kilometer stretch from Nichols to Alabang was finished by 1970.

These contracts also allowed the CDCP to gain back their expenditures and/or capital by collecting toll fees for a decade, "starting from 1968 or until it accumulated $6.1 million, whichever came first." The CDCP, however, requested that the duration be extended, as well the amount increased, justifying that their cost of operations had also inflated, and that they were held responsible "not only to maintain the highways but also to improve and 'expand' them." Although a report by the Toll Regulatory Board (TRB) showed evidence that CDCP had amassed $25.6 million already in one year alone from 1976–77, the TRB approved their request and extended the duration to thirty years. Presidential Decrees 1112 and 1113 in 1977 also imposed an increase in toll rates, forcing the public to pay steep fees that would primarily benefit the CDCP's and Cuenca's pockets. During a 1975 toll hike, buses boycotted the NLEX and SLEX roads. The Marcos administration retaliated by releasing a presidential decree that closed service roads for buses, which then had no choice but to pass through the expressways.

==== San Juanico Bridge ====
In 1974, the Marcos administration and the CDCP tapped Japanese Official Development Assistance (ODA) loans to build the San Juanico Bridge, which crossed the San Juanico Strait and connected the two then-underdeveloped islands of Leyte and Samar. With a total length of 2.16 kilometers (1.34 mi), it remains the longest bridge spanning a body of seawater in the Philippines.

It was touted as President Ferdinand Marcos' "birthday gift" to his wife Imelda, and it was one of the high-visibility foreign-loan projects initiated by Marcos during the run-up to the 1969 Presidential election campaign. Completed four years later, it was inaugurated on July 2, 1973 - Imelda Marcos' birthday.

Upon its completion, economists and public works engineers tagged it as a "white elephant" which was "constructed several decades too soon", because its average daily traffic was too low to justify the cost of its construction. As a result, its construction has been associated with what has been called the Marcoses' "edifice complex".

In the decades after the Marcoses administration, economic activity in Samar and Leyte finally caught up with the bridge's intended function, and it has become an iconic tourist attraction acknowledged as "part of the identity of people in Samar and Leyte."

==== Manila Bay Reclamation ====
The CDCP, again at Imelda's behest, sought out a land reclamation project in Manila Bay. They were to construct an artificial 240-hectare white beach behind the Cultural Center of the Philippines. The rationale of the project was to create a 'Cannes' vibe for the international visitors of the Manila Film Festival. The white sand was quarried from the towns of Mariveles in Bataan and Cavite City. This area is now known as the Manila Bay Free port Zone. Also at Imelda's command, the CDCP and other companies worked to create a "huge complex of native-style pavilions" for representatives of the United Nations Conference on Trade and Development in their 1979 conference in Manila. The complex became a ghost town throughout the 1980s.

==== Light Rail Transit ====
Another project of the CDCP was the Light Rail Transit (LRT), this time partly financed by a $40 million loan from the Belgian government. A study of the World Bank in 1977 challenged the intentions of the project, stating that Manila needed a street-level transport system, not a 'high-flyer'. A street-level transport system would also cost much cheaper, with only a $8.1 million estimate, compared to the $278 million over-all cost for the LRT. Despite these skepticism, Marcos permitted Cuenca to begin construction in October 1981.

==== Other projects ====
Other projects the CDCP under Cuenca handled were the Pantabangan Dam, and the Candaba Viaduct.

==== Turnover of Chairmanship to Roberto Ongpin ====
Cuenca eventually invited Roberto Ongpin to take his place as CDCP chairman, although Cuenca kept his position as president, and "7% ownership" of the firm.

== 1987 PCGG Case ==
On July 24, 1987, the Presidential Commission on Good Government (PCGG) filed a case whose respondents included Cuenca and his son Roberto, Imelda Marcos, Roberto Ongpin, former Philippine National Bank president Panfilo Domingo, Development Bank of the Philippines officer Don Ferry, and eleven others, claiming that the respondents had engaged in “schemes, devices or stratagems” to acquire ill-gotten wealth. On August 5, 2010, the Sandiganbayan dismissed the case after throwing out 60 of the 100 documentary exhibits presented by the PCGG at the trial because they were photocopies, rather than originals of the documents. The 27-page decision penned by Sandiganbayan Associate Justice Alex Quiroz, asserted that “since the due execution and authenticity of said photocopied documents had not been proved, the same were inadmissible in evidence. Further, the documents in question were rendered inadmissible as they were only photocopies.”

In June 2018, the Philippine Supreme Court’s First Division dismissed the complaint of the PCGG against the 2010 Sandiganbayan ruling, stating that the court was not able to review the evidence in order to rule on the PCGG’s complaint. The 28-page decision penned by Supreme Court Associate Justice Noel Tijam said that: "In order to determine the veracity of the Republic's main contention that it has established a prima facie case against respondents through its documentary and testimonial evidence, a reassessment and reexamination of the evidence is necessary[….] Unfortunately, the limited and discretionary judicial review allowed under Rule 45 does not envision a re-evaluation of the sufficiency of the evidence upon which respondent court's action was predicated. "

The PCGG released a press statement reacting to the decision, saying "Although the complaint was filed by the PCGG more than 31 years ago, and the Supreme Court decision was a mere affirmation of the Sandiganbayan ruling 8 years ago, the present officials of PCGG will still exhaust all possible legal remedies to pursue the case and to protect government interest.”

== 2010 biography ==
In the 2000s, Cuenca sought out authors Jose Dalisay Jr. and Antonette Reyes to write his biography, which was eventually published in September 2010 under the title "Builder of Bridges: the Rudy Cuenca Story".

Journalist Amando Doronila, who had himself been one of the first critics arrested when Marcos proclaimed martial law in 1972, noted that "the book is the first time a Marcos crony or a senior functionary has written about his role in the Marcos hierarchy," adding that in the book, "Rodolfo Cuenca who admits to being a Marcos crony, reveals for the first time an insider’s view of the heightening rivalry among power blocs within the Marcos inner circle as the dictator’s health started to deteriorate in 1983... The book reveals the corruption and the corrosive tensions among the Marcos’ Palace elite that contributed to its downfall during the last three years of the dictatorship."

== Death ==
Rodolfo Cuenca died in October 2023, at the age of 95.

== See also ==
- Cronies of Ferdinand Marcos
- Ferdinand Marcos
