= Mae Paner =

Filipino actress and activist

- Occupations: Activist, political satirist, and actress
- Known for: Juana Change character

Mae Paner is a Filipino activist, political satirist, and actress.

== Early life and education ==
Mae Paner was born to a family with seven children. She is the second eldest among siblings. She attended the University of Santo Tomas (UST) where she majored in psychology.

== Career ==
=== Theater and advertising ===
She began her acting career in theater in the 1970s when she was still attending UST. She would become an actress and a production assistant. By the time she reached her 20s, Paner is already directing audio-visual presentations. By around this time her elder sibling and father had died, which meant that she had to take care of her younger siblings and mother who is already bedridden.

Her background in theater helped her land a role in television commercials. In 1984, Motion Grafix tapped her service to play the antagonist role of "Shellane" in a commercial for their client Petron. She was offered the role of production assistant after filming. She also served as a partner for production companies Electromedia and Click Digital Post. She has since left the advertising industry.

She was part of the Philippine Educational Theater Association (PETA). She joined the Panata sa Kalayaan of PETA in the late 1980s as an actress and head stage manager. After the conclusion of the world tour, she became tour director.

=== Acting and directing career ===
In 2003, Paner directed a commercial featuring Dennis Trillo for a product from Globe Telecom and its partnership with Jollibee.

In 2013, Paner starred in the 2013 sex comedy film Juana C the Movie. In the film which also tackled political themes such as corruption, she played the role of Juana Change.

Paner would direct and perform the 2021 film Tao Po which was adopted from a theater play. The film tackled the issue of extrajudicial killings.

== Activism ==
Paner owes her involvement in politics through her participation in theater. She and her colleagues would take part in protest against the administration of President Ferdinand Marcos. She was arrested in 1984 but was released. In contemporary times, she is more focused on doing "performance activist", dressing up as characters as part of her activism.

Among the issues she has covered include the Reproductive Health Bill, and the Philippine drug war.

=== Juana Change ===
Juana Change
- First appearance: Juana Change (YouTube); 2008
- Created by: Artists Movement
- Portrayed by: Mae Paner

In-universe information
- Nationality: Filipino

Paner is best known for her character as "Juana Change". The character was first featured in a YouTube parody series produced by the Artists Movement, a group of anti-corruption activists which Paner founded. Through Juana, Paner intends to encourage change in Philippine political politics. The YouTube series was launched in December 2008.

=== Impersonation ===
She has impersonated various political figures as part of her critique. At the Grand Mañanita protest, she dressed up as Metro Manila Police Chief Debold Sinas in June 2020 as a reference to Sinas' controversial birthday celebration amidst prevailing COVID-19 community quarantine measures. At the sidelines of the 2020 State of the Nation Address, she dressed up as Harry Roque along with inflatable orcas which alludes to Roque's visit to Ocean Adventure in Subic Bay despite COVID-19 quarantine measures.

== Personal life ==
In 2015, Paner is single.

== Filmography ==
=== Film ===
Year	Title	Role	Notes
2013	Norte, the End of History	Magda	
2013	Juana C. the Movie	Juana Change	
2014	My Illegal Wife	Madam	
2016	The Woman Who Left	Warden	
2021	Tao Po		Also director and writer
2021	History of Ha		
2023	Oras de Peligro	Doña Jessa	
2025	Flower Girl		

=== Television ===
Year	Title	Role	Notes
1993	Noli Me Tangere	Tindera	
