= List of Inday Will Always Love You episodes =

Inday Will Always Love You (International title: Happy Together) is a 2018 Philippine romantic comedy series starring Barbie Forteza, Derrick Monasterio and Juancho Trivino. The series premiered on GMA Network's GMA Telebabad evening block and worldwide via GMA Pinoy TV on May 21 to October 5, 2018, replacing The One That Got Away.

As of October 5, 2018, 100 episodes of Inday Will Always Love You were aired over two seasons.

NUTAM (Nationwide Urban Television Audience Measurement) People in Television Homes ratings are provided by AGB Nielsen Philippines.

== Series overview ==
Season	Episodes	Originally released	
Season	Episodes	First released	Last released
1	65	May 21, 2018	August 17, 2018
2	35	August 20, 2018	October 5, 2018

== Episodes ==
=== Season 1 (2018) ===
==== May 2018 ====
No. overall	No. in season	Episode	Original air date	Social media hashtag	AGB Nielsen NUTAM People in Television Homes			Ref.
No. overall	No. in season	Episode	Original air date	Social media hashtag	Audience Share	Timeslot rank	Whole day rank	Ref.
1	1	"Bonggang Pilot" (Amazing Pilot)	May 21, 2018	#IWALYBonggangPilot	42.0%	#1	#6	
2	2	"Demolisyon" (Demolition)	May 22, 2018	#IWALYDemolisyon	45.2%	#1	#5	
3	3	"Ex Battalion"	May 23, 2018	#ExBattalionOnIWALY	42.7%	#1	#5	
4	4	"Hello Tekla"	May 24, 2018	#IWALYHelloTekla	44.9%	#1	#5	
5	5	"Hostage Taking"	May 25, 2018	#IWALYHostageTaking	51.5%	#1	#6	
6	6	"Happylou Level Up"	May 28, 2018	#IWALYHappylouLevelUp	11.1%	#1		
7	7	"Kimpoy"	May 29, 2018	#KimpoyOnIWALY	10.8%	#1		
8	8	"Falling"	May 30, 2018	#IWALYFalling	10.1%	#1		
9	9	"Scandal"	May 31, 2018	#IWALYScandal	10.9%	#1		

==== June 2018 ====
No. overall	No. in season	Episode	Original air date	Social media hashtag	AGB Nielsen NUTAM People in Television Homes			Ref.
No. overall	No. in season	Episode	Original air date	Social media hashtag	Audience Share	Timeslot rank	Whole day rank	Ref.
10	10	"Laban, Inday" (Fight, Inday)	June 1, 2018	#IWALYLabanInday	10.1%	#1		
11	11	"Friend Zone"	June 4, 2018	#IWALYFriendZone	8.9%	#1		
12	12	"Lucky Inday"	June 5, 2018	#IWALYLuckyInday	9.1%	#1		
13	13	"Secret Island"	June 6, 2018	#IWALYSecretIsland	9.6%	#1		
14	14	"Marta vs. Amanda"	June 7, 2018	#IWALYMartaVsAmanda	10.3%	#1		
15	15	"Rebelasyon" (Revelation)	June 8, 2018	#IWALYRebelasyon	9.6%	#1		
16	16	"Bagsik ni Amanda" (Amanda's Fierceness)	June 11, 2018	#IWALYBagsikNiAmanda	9.8%	#1		
17	17	"Danger"	June 12, 2018	#IWALYDanger	10.9%	#1		
Philip asks Happylou to continue working at the company and to remain living at the mansion. Happyliz goes missing. Amanda plots against Philip. Patrick works on wedding plans.
18	18	"Kutob" (Hunch)	June 13, 2018	#IWALYKutob	10.8%	#1		
19	19	"Kidnap"	June 14, 2018	#IWALYKidnap	10.7%	#1		
20	20	"Pasabog" (Petard)	June 15, 2018	#IWALYPasabog	10.7%	#1		
21	21	"Trahedya" (Tragedy)	June 18, 2018	#IWALYTrahedya	10.8%	#1		
22	22	"Lihim ni Marta" (Marta's Secret)	June 19, 2018	#IWALYLihimNiMarta	9.9%	#1		
23	23	"Matinding Rebelasyon" (Intense Revelation)	June 20, 2018	#IWALYMatindingRebelasyon	10.3%	#1		
24	24	"Patrick's Love"	June 21, 2018	#IWALYPatricksLove	9.4%	#1		
25	25	"Tagapagmana" (Heiress)	June 22, 2018	#IWALYTagapagmana	9.8%	#1		
26	26	"Inday Makeover"	June 25, 2018	#IWALYIndayMakeover	10.1%	#1		
27	27	"Inday CEO"	June 26, 2018	#IWALYIndayCEO	10.2%	#1		
28	28	"Pagbabalik" (Coming Back)	June 27, 2018	#IWALYPagbabalik	10.8%	#1		
29	29	"Patrick's Father"	June 28, 2018	#IWALYPatricksFather	10.3%	#1		
30	30	"Panganib" (Danger)	June 29, 2018	#IWALYPanganib	10.0%	#1		

==== July 2018 ====
No. overall	No. in season	Episode	Original air date	Social media hashtag	AGB Nielsen NUTAM People in Television Homes			Ref.
No. overall	No. in season	Episode	Original air date	Social media hashtag	Audience Share	Timeslot rank	Whole day rank	Ref.
31	31	"Trapped"	July 2, 2018	#IWALYTrapped	8.7%	#1		
32	32	"Goodbye Amanda"	July 3, 2018	#IWALYGoodbyeAmanda	9.9%	#1		
33	33	"Love Triangle"	July 4, 2018	#IWALYLoveTriangle	9.5%	#1		
34	34	"Crazy Ex Girlfriend"	July 5, 2018	#IWALYCrazyExGirlfriend	9.9%	#1		
35	35	"Galawang Philip" (Philip's Moves)	July 6, 2018	#IWALYGalawangPhilip	9.4%	#1		
36	36	"Happylou's Sister"	July 9, 2018	#IWALYHappylousSister	9.0%	#1		
37	37	"Rivalry"	July 10, 2018	#IWALYRivalry	9.1%	#1		
38	38	"Amanda Returns"	July 11, 2018	#IWALYAmandaReturns	9.2%	#1		
39	39	"Kim Domingo"	July 12, 2018	#KimDomingoOnIWALY	9.5%	#1		
40	40	"Cruise"	July 13, 2018	#IWALYCruise	8.6%	#1		
41	41	"Sabwatan" (Conspiracy)	July 16, 2018	#IWALYSabwatan	9.0%	#1		
42	42	"Laban, Happylou" (Fight, Happylou)	July 17, 2018	#IWALYLabanHappylou	9.3%	#1		
43	43	"Ernest's Heartbreak"	July 18, 2018	#IWALYErnestsHeartbreak	8.3%	#1		
44	44	"Happylou vs. Sunshine"	July 19, 2018	#IWALYHappylouVsSunshine	8.1%	#1		
45	45	"Beach Sabotage"	July 20, 2018	#IWALYBeachSabotage	9.4%	#1	#6	
46	46	"Inday Palaban" (Gladiatorial Inday)	July 23, 2018	#IWALYIndayPalaban	9.7%	#1		
47	47	"Korean Visitors"	July 24, 2018	#IWALYKoreanVisitors	8.9%	#1		
48	48	"ExB Concert"	July 25, 2018	#ExBConcertOnIWALY	9.1%	#1		
49	49	"Katrina Halili"	July 26, 2018	#KatrinaHalilionIWALY	9.1%	#1		
50	50	"Pasabog ni Amanda" (Amanda's Petard)	July 27, 2018	#IWALYPasabogNiAmanda	9.8%	#1		
51	51	"Fake"	July 30, 2018	#IWALYFake	8.8%	#1	#7	
52	52	"The Big Reveal"	July 31, 2018	#IWALYTheBigReveal	9.8%	#1		

==== August 2018 ====
No. overall	No. in season	Episode	Original air date	Social media hashtag	AGB Nielsen NUTAM People in Television Homes			Ref.
No. overall	No. in season	Episode	Original air date	Social media hashtag	Audience Share	Timeslot rank	Whole day rank	Ref.
53	53	"Laban, Philip" (Fight, Philip)	August 1, 2018	#IWALYLabanPhilip	9.2%	#1	#5	
54	54	"Pagsubok" (Trial)	August 2, 2018	#IWALYPagsubok	8.7%	#1	#7	
55	55	"Amandarific"	August 3, 2018	#IWALYAmandarific	9.7%	#1	#6	
56	56	"Explosion"	August 6, 2018	#IWALYExplosion	8.4%	#1	#7	
57	57	"Bagong Simula" (New Beginning)	August 7, 2018	#IWALYBagongSimula	9.0%	#1	#6	
58	58	"Happy Lechon"	August 8, 2018	#IWALYHappyLechon	8.5%	#1	#7	
59	59	"Gulo sa Palengke" (Trouble in Marketplace)	August 9, 2018	#IWALYGuloSaPalengke	8.7%	#1	#7	
60	60	"Carcareer Queen"	August 10, 2018	#IWALYCarcareerQueen	7.8%	#1	#8	
61	61	"Agaw Buhay" (Dying)	August 13, 2018	#IWALYAgawBuhay	8.3%	#1	#7	
62	62	"Fight Inday"	August 14, 2018	#IWALYFightInday	8.3%	#1	#7	
63	63	"Matinding Desisyon" (Strongly Decision)	August 15, 2018	#IWALYMatindingDesisyon	8.2%	#1	#7	
64	64	"Kyline and Jean"	August 16, 2018	#KylineAndJeanOnIWALY	7.8%	#1	#8	
65	65	"Barbecute"	August 17, 2018	#IWALYBarbecute	8.6%	#1	#8	

=== Season 2 (2018) ===
==== August 2018 ====
No. overall	No. in season	Episode	Original air date	Social media hashtag	AGB Nielsen NUTAM People in Television Homes			Ref.
No. overall	No. in season	Episode	Original air date	Social media hashtag	Audience Share	Timeslot rank	Whole day rank	Ref.
66	1	"Amanda's Plan"	August 20, 2018	#IWALYAmandasPlan	9.4%	#1	#7	
67	2	"Bintang" (Imputation)	August 21, 2018	#IWALYBintang	8.8%	#1	#7	
68	3	"Kimberlou's Mom"	August 22, 2018	#IWALYKimberlousMom	8.9%	#1	#7	
69	4	"Ratratan"	August 23, 2018	#IWALYRatratan	9.3%	#1	#8	
70	5	"Kimberlou's GF"	August 24, 2018	#IWALYKimberlousGF	8.5%	#2	#8	
71	6	"Marta's New Friend"	August 27, 2018	#IWALYMartasNewFriend	8.2%	#1	#7	
72	7	"Liga sa Barangay" (League in the Village)	August 28, 2018	#IWALYLigaSaBarangay	8.1%	#1	#7	
73	8	"Selos" (Envy)	August 29, 2018	#IWALYSelos	7.9%	#2	#9	
74	9	"Peligro" (Risk)	August 30, 2018	#IWALYPeligro	8.5%	#1	#8	
75	10	"Patrick in Danger"	August 31, 2018	#IWALYPatrickInDanger	8.8%	#1	#8	

==== September 2018 ====
No. overall	No. in season	Episode	Original air date	Social media hashtag	AGB Nielsen NUTAM People in Television Homes			Ref.
No. overall	No. in season	Episode	Original air date	Social media hashtag	Audience Share	Timeslot rank	Whole day rank	Ref.
76	11	"Happyliz's Mom"	September 3, 2018	#IWALYHappylizMom	7.7%	#1	#8	
77	12	"Laban" (Fight)	September 4, 2018	#IWALYLaban	7.8%	#2		
78	13	"Mother's Love"	September 5, 2018	#IWALYMothersLove	7.7%	#1	#9	
79	14	"Sakripisyo" (Sacrifice)	September 6, 2018	#IWALYSakripisyo	5.7%	#2	#14	
80	15	"Bagong Kaibigan" (New Friend)	September 7, 2018	#IWALYBagongKaibigan	7.6%	#1	#9	
81	16	"Wedding Gift"	September 10, 2018	#IWALYWeddingGift	6.9%	#1	#15	
82	17	"Patrick vs. Pabs"	September 11, 2018	#IWALYPatrickVsPabs	8.3%	#1	#9	
83	18	"Wowowin"	September 12, 2018	#WowowinOnIWALY	8.6%	#1	#7	
84	19	"Hep-hep Hooray"	September 13, 2018	#IWALYHephepHooray	8.4%	#1	#8	
85	20	"The Wedding"	September 14, 2018	#IWALYTheWedding	8.2%	#1	#8	
86	21	"Where is Marta?"	September 17, 2018	#IWALYWhereIsMarta	8.0%	#2		
87	22	"Kyline"	September 18, 2018	#KylineOnIWALY	7.5%	#1	#8	
88	23	"Finding Nanay" (Finding Mom)	September 19, 2018	#IWALYFindingNanay	6.9%	#2	#9	
89	24	"Pagbabalik" (Comeback)	September 20, 2018	#IWALYPagbabalik	7.7%	#1	#7	
90	25	"Marta is Back"	September 21, 2018	#IWALYMartaIsBack	8.3%	#1	#7	
91	26	"Marta's Revenge"	September 24, 2018	#IWALYMartasRevenge	8.4%	#1	#7	
92	27	"Karma ni Amanda" (Amanda's Karma)	September 25, 2018	#IWALYKarmaNiAmanda	7.7%	#2	#8	
93	28	"Up Down"	September 26, 2018	#IWALYUpDown	7.9%	#2	#8	
94	29	"Suspetsa" (Suspect)	September 27, 2018	#IWALYSuspetsa	8.3%	#1	#8	
95	30	"Happylou's Decision"	September 28, 2018	#IWALYHappylousDecision	8.9%	#1	#5	

==== October 2018 ====
No. overall	No. in season	Episode	Original air date	Social media hashtag	AGB Nielsen NUTAM People in Television Homes			Ref.
No. overall	No. in season	Episode	Original air date	Social media hashtag	Audience Share	Timeslot rank	Whole day rank	Ref.
96	31	"Ericka Strikes Back"	October 1, 2018	#IWALYErickaStrikesBack	7.9%	#2		
97	32	"The One"	October 2, 2018	#IWALYTheOne	8.0%	#1		
98	33	"Inday Says Yes"	October 3, 2018	#IWALYIndaySaysYes	8.1%	#1		
99	34	"The Wedding"	October 4, 2018	#IWALYTheWedding	7.6%	#1		
100	35	"Bonggang Finale" (Amazing Finale)	October 5, 2018	#IWALYBonggangFinale	10.8%	#1		
