= Oras de Peligro =

- Theatrical release poster
- Directed by: Joel Lamangan
- Written by: Boni Ilagan, Eric Ramos
- Produced by: Jaypee Calleja; Nor Domingo; Tito Garcia; Alvi Siongco
- Starring: Allen Dizon; Cherry Pie Picache; Mae Paner; Therese Malvar; Dave Bornea
- Cinematography: TM Malones
- Edited by: Gilbert Obispo
- Music by: Eddie Pagayon
- Production company: Bagong Siklab Productions
- Distributed by: Solar Pictures
- Release date: March 1, 2023 (Philippines)
- Running time: 104 minutes
- Country: Philippines
- Language: Filipino

Oras de Peligro (lit. Hour of Danger) is a 2023 Philippine crime drama film directed by Joel Lamangan. The film was written by Boni Ilagan and Eric Ramos and stars Allen Dizon, Cherry Pie Picache, Mae Paner, Therese Malvar, and Dave Bornea.

The film is set in the Philippines during the last days of the Marcos dictatorship, during the People Power Revolution that sent dictator Ferdinand Marcos fleeing into exile in Hawaii.

== Synopsis ==
The film tells the story of a family struggling with economic hardships and personal tragedy, and the characters’ involvement in the civil disobedience campaign to protest election fraud during the 1986 Snap Elections.

== Release ==
An invitational premiere was held at Cine Adarna in the University of the Philippines on February 24, 2023. The screening was followed by an open forum with the film cast, crew, and martial law survivor and poet Mila D. Aguilar. The film was released along with Martyr or Murderer.

== Cast ==
- Allen Dizon as Dario Marianas
- Cherry Pie Picache as Beatriz
- Therese Malvar as Nerissa
- Dave Bornea as Jimmy
- Mae Paner as Doña Jessa
- Nanding Josef as Ka Elyong
- Apollo Abraham as Sgt. Gallido
- Jim Pebanco as Cpl. Cardema
- Allan Paule as Bembol
- Joe Gruta
- Edru Abraham as Ka Lito

== Reception ==
Stephanie Mayo of Daily Tribune give the film a negative feedback and wrote:

Unfortunately, Joel Lamangan’s movie is a rushed, panicky job to educate the Filipino people with such urgency that it forgets artistic quality.
