= Ilawod =

- Theatrical film poster
- Directed by: Dan Villegas
- Written by: Yvette Tan
- Produced by: Joji Alonso; Patricia Sumagui
- Starring: Iza Calzado; Ian Veneracion; Xyriel Manabat; Harvey Bautista; Therese Malvar
- Cinematography: Mycko David
- Edited by: Marya Ignacio
- Music by: Emerzon Texon
- Production companies: Buchi Boy Entertainment; MJM Productions; Quantum Films; Tuko Film Productions
- Distributed by: Quantum Films
- Release date: January 18, 2017
- Running time: 95 minutes
- Country: Philippines
- Language: Filipino

Ilawod is a 2017 Filipino independent supernatural horror film directed by Dan Villegas, in his first venture into the horror genre as a director, from a screenplay written by Palanca winner Yvette Tan. Starring Iza Calzado, Ian Veneracion, Xyriel Manabat, Harvey Bautista, and Therese Malvar, the story follows a family's breakdown in the midst of a demonic attack.

Distributed by Quantum Films, which co-produced the film with Buchi Boy Entertainment, MJM Productions, and Tuko Film Productions, the film was theatrically released on January 18, 2017.

== Plot ==
The film opens with Dennis, an online journalist, interviewing a disturbed man who claims that a water spirit has entered his home and harmed his family. After completing the assignment, Dennis travels back to Manila, unaware that a fragment of the entity—known as an Ilawod, a lower-river elemental—has followed him.

Upon his return, the household begins to experience minor disturbances involving water. Dennis notices an unusual sensation in his mouth whenever he drinks; the water tastes metallic and bitter, though he is unsure of the cause. This symptom gradually worsens and signals the first physical sign of the Ilawod’s presence.

Dennis’s children, Ben and Bea, begin sensing changes in their environment. Ben is the first to directly encounter the entity. The Ilawod appears to him in a calm, childlike form near sinks and faucets. It speaks to him, claims to be a friend, and slowly encourages him to isolate himself from the rest of the family.

Bea experiences a contrasting manifestation. She sees a darker, more threatening version of the spirit lurking in hallways and bedrooms. Water begins appearing unexpectedly in her belongings, and she suffers from recurring night disturbances that leave her visibly distressed.

Dennis’s wife, Kathy, gradually becomes irritable and emotionally unstable. The Ilawod subtly influences her reactions, amplifying frustration and conflict within the family. Arguments between her and Dennis become more frequent as the atmosphere at home grows tense.

As the days progress, the Ilawod’s presence strengthens. Ben becomes secretive and withdrawn, increasingly protective of the entity. Bea experiences episodes of fear and confusion, sometimes waking up drenched or finding unexplained pools of water around her. Dennis’s strange taste sensations intensify, reflecting the spirit’s deeper attachment to him.

Suspicious of the growing disturbances, Dennis reviews his earlier interview footage. He notices abnormal water movement in the background, leading him to conclude that the elemental traveled home with him and is now feeding on the emotional discord inside their house.

The Ilawod escalates its influence. Ben is manipulated into assisting the spirit, while Bea faces more dangerous encounters that threaten her safety. Kathy reaches a breaking point, further increasing the negativity that empowers the entity.

In the climax, Dennis attempts to confront and sever Ilawod’s connection to the family. The spirit manifests aggressively, targeting each family member simultaneously. Dennis struggles to pull Ben away from the entity’s control as Bea and Kathy attempt to escape the increasingly violent manifestations.

The confrontation ends when Dennis disrupts the elemental’s hold, weakening it enough to force it out of their home. The family survives the ordeal, though emotionally shaken.

The film concludes with the family attempting to return to normalcy, leaving the fate and possible return of the Ilawod uncertain.

== Cast ==
- Ian Veneracion as Dennis
- Iza Calzado as Kathy
- Harvey Bautista as Ben
- Xyriel Manabat as Bea
- Therese Malvar
- Epy Quizon

== See also ==
- List of ghost films
