= Inagaw na Bituin =

2019 Philippine television drama series

- Title card
- Also known as: Written in the Stars
- Genre: Drama; Musical
- Created by: Jason John Lim
- Written by: Obet Villela; Jaymee Katanyag; Tina Velasco
- Directed by: Mark A. Reyes V
- Creative director: Aloy Adlawan
- Starring: Kyline Alcantara; Therese Malvar
- Theme music composer: Ann Margaret Figueroa
- Opening theme: "Kinang" by Kyline Alcantara
- Country of origin: Philippines
- Original language: Tagalog
- No. of episodes: 68 (list of episodes)

Production
- Executive producer: Rosie Lyn Atienza
- Camera setup: Multiple-camera setup
- Running time: 22–39 minutes
- Production company: GMA Entertainment Group

Original release
- Network: GMA Network
- Release: February 11 – May 17, 2019

Inagaw na Bituin (transl. taken star / international title: Written in the Stars) is a 2019 Philippine television drama musical series broadcast by GMA Network. Directed by Mark A. Reyes V, it stars Kyline Alcantara and Therese Malvar. It premiered on February 11, 2019 on the network's Afternoon Prime line up. The series concluded on May 17, 2019, with a total of 68 episodes.

Originally titled as Kidnap, it was later renamed to Inagaw na Bituin. The series is streaming online on YouTube.

== Premise ==
The relationship between Edward and Belinda will be put to a test after their only daughter, Anna, is kidnapped. With the loss of their real daughter, they will focus their attention and love on their niece, Ariela. While Anna will grow up as Elsa with Aurora. Due to music, their families will cross paths.

== Cast and characters ==
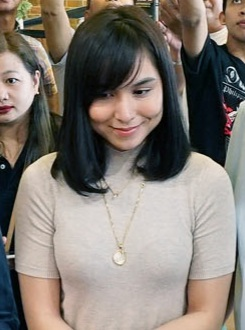
Kyline Alcantara portrays Anna Lopez Sevilla.

Lead cast

- Kyline Alcantara as Anna Lopez Sevilla
- Therese Malvar as Ariela Lopez Sevilla

Supporting cast

- Sunshine Dizon as Belinda Lopez vda. de-Sevilla
- Angelika Dela Cruz as Lucinda "Lucy" Lopez
- Marvin Agustin as Edward Sevilla
- Angelu de Leon as Aurora "Auring" Mendoza vda. de Dela Cruz
- Gabby Eigenmann as George Del Mundo
- Jackie Lou Blanco as Regina Lopez
- Manolo Pedrosa as Prince Antonio
- Renz Valerio as Philip Henry Bautista
- Melbelline Caluag as Melody M. Dela Cruz
- Patricia Tumulak as Queenie Belardo
- Yana Asistio as Christiana "Tiana" Pablo
- Jerald Napoles as Paul Isagan

Guest cast

- Michael Flores as Enrique "Iking" Dela Cruz
- Ramon Christopher Gutierrez as Wolfgang Garcia
- Ashley Cabrera as younger Anna
- Jazz Yburan as younger Ariela
- Dayara Shane as younger Lucy
- Lynn Ynchausti-Cruz as Socorro Dela Cruz
- Patricia Ysmael as Tasya
- Maritess Joaquin as Mina
- André Paras as a singing competition host
- Rich Asuncion as Kaye
- Garrett Bolden as a singing competition judge
- Danielle Ozaraga as Daniele Mae Clemente
- Shyr Valdez as Fiona
- Cheche Tolentino as Diana
- Sandy Tolentino as Gisela
- Mia Pangyarihan as Porshie
- Aleera Montalla as Ces
- Arrian Labios as Gorio

== Casting ==
Migo Adecer was initially hired to portray as Prince Antonio. Adecer later left during pre-production due to joining the drama series, Sahaya. Manolo Pedrosa served as his replacement.

== Production ==
Principal photography commenced on November 5, 2018. Filming concluded on May 8, 2019.

== Ratings ==
According to AGB Nielsen Philippines' Nationwide Urban Television Audience Measurement People in television homes, the pilot episode of Inagaw na Bituin earned a 6.1% rating.
