= Inday Will Always Love You =

2018 Philippine television drama series

- Title card
- Also known as: Happy Together
- Genre: Drama; Romantic comedy
- Created by: Neil B. Gumban
- Written by: Zig Dulay; Nathaniel Arciaga; Mix Villalon; Acy Ramos; Carlo Obispo; Troy Espiritu; Eljay Dedoc
- Directed by: Monti Puno Parungao; Rember Gelera
- Starring: Barbie Forteza
- Country of origin: Philippines
- Original languages: Tagalog; Cebuano
- No. of seasons: 2
- No. of episodes: 100 (list of episodes)

Production
- Executive producer: John Mychal Alabado Feraren
- Production locations: Cebu, Philippines
- Editors: Veronica Unson; James Li; Sony Custado; Lainy Barodi
- Camera setup: Multiple-camera setup
- Running time: 17–35 minutes
- Production company: GMA Public Affairs

Original release
- Network: GMA Network
- Release: May 21 – October 5, 2018

Inday Will Always Love You (international title: Happy Together) is a 2018 Philippine television drama romance comedy series broadcast by GMA Network. Directed by Monti Puno Parungao and Rember Gelera, it stars Barbie Forteza in the title role. It premiered on May 21, 2018 on the network's Telebabad line up. The series concluded on October 5, 2018, with a total of 100 episodes.

The series is streaming online on YouTube.

== Premise ==
Happylou moves to Cebu in order to help her family who lives beside a train track. She also starts searching for her father that she has never met. She will eventually meet the people that will give answers to her lifelong questions.

== Cast and characters ==
Cast

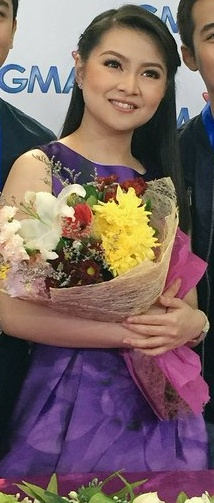
Barbie Forteza

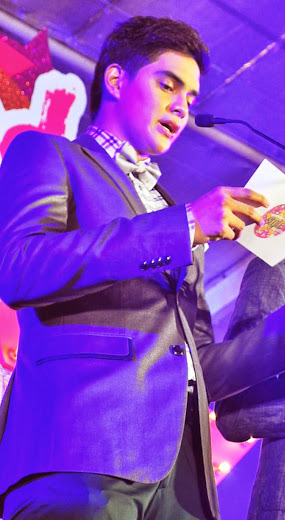
Juancho Triviño

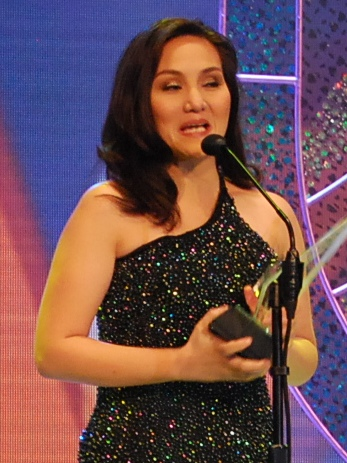
Gladys Reyes

Lead cast

- Barbie Forteza as Happylou "Inday" M. Fuentes-Melendez

Supporting cast

- Derrick Monasterio as Patrick Melendez
- Juancho Triviño as Ernest Pascual
- Ricky Davao as Philip Fuentes
- Gladys Reyes as Amanda Melendez
- Manilyn Reynes as Marta Magtibay-Fuentes
- Nova Villa as Loleng Magtibay
- Tina Paner as Madonna
- Kim Rodriguez as Ericka Ferraren
- Super Tekla as Kimberlou / Dominador
- Sherliz Simon as Happyliz "Lizliz" Magtibay
- Buboy Villar as Paeng
- Kimpoy Feliciano as Frank Santiago / Rocky
- Charice Hermoso as Kisses
- Charlotte Hermoso as Tricia
- Vangie Labalan as Tessa

Guest cast

- Ex Battalion as themselves
- Archie Alemania as Archie
- Archie Adamos as a demolition leader
- Sue Prado as Keri
- Carmelo Gutierrez as Chosa
- Antonette Garcia as Chubbyleta
- Sanya Lopez as Lea
- Solenn Heussaff as Joanna
- Christopher Roxas as Byron
- Arny Ross as Gina
- Nina Ricci Alagao as Christina Lazo
- Wendell Ramos as Perry Fuentes
- Lharby Policarpio as David
- Tonio Quiazon as a general
- Ayra Mariano as Sunshine Fuentes
- Giselle Sanchez as Lorna
- Beverly Salviejo as Dixy
- Kim Domingo as Chuchay
- Andrea del Rosario as Amelia
- Bryan Benedict as Lando
- Jet Alcantara as Isko
- Omar Flores as Ton
- Kristoffer King as Boyet
- Alma Concepcion as Marcy Ferraren
- Alexander Lee as a tourist
- Dasuri Choi as a tourist
- Katrina Halili as herself
- Betong Sumaya as Britney
- Lovi Poe as Lovejoy
- Epy Quizon as Volta
- Divine Aucina as a wet market vendor
- Jade Lopez as a wet market vendor
- Boobay as Norman
- Therese Malvar as younger Amanda
- Maey Bautista as the host of Search for Carcarian Queen
- Franchesca Salcedo as Jing
- Thea Tolentino as Ruby
- Tony Mabesa as San Pedro
- Jean Garcia as Florence
- Kyline Alcantara as Leslie Anne
- Jason Abalos as Russell
- Victor Neri as Budots
- Lotlot de Leon as D
- Keempee de Leon as Joaquin
- Angelu de Leon as Ricka
- Pen Medina as Afredo
- Ruru Madrid as Pabs
- Willie Revillame as himself
- Sunshine Dizon as Martina Lazo
- Nonong de Andres as Teggy

== Production ==
Principal photography commenced in February 2018 in Cebu.

== Ratings ==
According to AGB Nielsen Philippines' Nationwide Urban Television People audience shares, the pilot episode of Inday Will Always Love You earned a 42% rating.

== Accolades ==
Accolades received by Inday Will Always Love You
Year	Award	Category	Recipient	Result	Ref.
2018	32nd PMPC Star Awards for Television	Best Primetime Drama Series	Inday Will Always Love You	Nominated	
2018	1st Asian Academy Creative Awards	Best Promo or Trailer (National)	Inday Will Always Love You	Won	
2018	4th LionhearTV RAWR Awards	Bet na Bet na Teleserye	Inday Will Always Love You	Won	
