= Philippine National Construction Corporation =

Philippine state-owned construction company

- Formerly: Construction and Development Corporation of the Philippines (1966-1983)
- Type: Public
- Traded as: PSE: PNC (trading suspended since May 2008)
- Industry: Construction and civil engineering
- Founded: 1966
- Headquarters: PNCC Complex, KM 15, East Service Road, San Martin de Porres, Parañaque, Philippines
- Key people: Josefa I. Aquino (chairman emeritus); Herculano C. Co (chairman); Miguel E. Umali (president & CEO); Abraham A. Purugganan (EVP & COO)
- Products: Architecture services Engineering services Infrastructure development Toll road management
- Revenue: ▲ ₱287.3 million (2021)
- Net income: ▲ ₱4.063 billion (2021)
- Number of employees: 56
- Website: www.pncc.ph

The Philippine National Construction Corporation (PNCC) is a de facto government-owned and controlled corporation (GOCC) of "acquired asset corporation" class in the Philippines. It was once said to be the largest construction company in the Philippines and in Southeast Asia.

It is usually tasked with major construction works, especially in the field of infrastructure. The PNCC has extensive operations in the Philippines, and has also been involved in projects and has or had operations in various other countries, notably in Saudi Arabia, Iraq, Hong Kong, Malaysia, and Indonesia.

== History ==
The PNCC was established in 1966 by virtue of an executive order during the administration of the former president Ferdinand Marcos as the Construction and Development Corporation of the Philippines (CDCP), with the corporation being led by Rodolfo Cuenca, a crony. It was granted a 50-year franchise to commission and perform construction works throughout the Philippines.

In 1977, Presidential Decree No. 1113 was issued, granting the CDCP a 30-year franchise to operate and maintain the various limited-access toll highways in the Philippines. The CDCP changed its name to its present name in 1983 after the infusion of additional equity from the government since 1981. On July 16, 2004, it was placed under the full supervision of the Office of the Secretary of the Department of Trade and Industry by virtue of Executive Order 331.

In 1981 it was granted the right of first refusal, preferred option to purchase, or develop the particular area (in the Manila-Cavite Coastal Road Reclamation Project) known as Central Business Park-1 (which now contains the SM Mall of Asia complex). It is through them that SM Investments started to get hold of the area by winning a 1988 bid for joint venture project, besting others with a PHP250 million offer..

Currently, it is under the purview of the finance department's attached agency, the Privatization and Management Office (PMO).

=== Projects ===
The PNCC has been involved in various projects over the years. Some of its most famous projects were the San Juanico Bridge, the Metro Manila Skyway, North and South Luzon Expressways, the Manila Light Rail Transit System, the Manila–Cavite Expressway and Bay City.

== Ownership ==
Updated Shareholding* Structure as of June 30, 2026:

Major Shareholder	% of Total*	Common Shares	Preferred Shares
Government of the Philippines**	52.40%	79,271,024	25,500,000
Government Service Insurance System	23.75%	47,490,383	—
Wellex Petroleum, Inc. (possibly related to the family of Senator Win Gatchalian)	15.269%	26,635,891	—
Others***	8.581%	21,047,461	—
Total	100%	174,444,759	25,500,000

*Total voting stock (i.e. common + voting preferred)
** through the Department of Finance's Privatization Management Office (PMO)
*** While the Philippine Central Depository (PCD) is listed a major shareholder, it is more of a trustee-nominee for all shares lodged in the PCD system rather than a single owner/shareholder. Major beneficial shareholders (i.e. those who own at least 5% of outstanding capital stock with voting rights) hidden, if any, under the PCD system are checked/identified and are disclosed with the Definitive Information Statement companies are submitting annually to the local bourse and Securities and Exchange Commission

== Subsidiaries ==
PNCC is divided into the following subsidiaries or affiliates:

- Dasmariñas Industrial and Steelworks Corporation
- Traffic Control Products Corporation
- South Metro Manila Skyway Project
- NLEX Corporation
- SMC SLEX Inc.
