= HVDC Leyte–Luzon =

High-voltage direct current transmission link in Philippines

- Map of HVDC Leyte–Luzon

Location
- Country: Philippines
- Province: Leyte; Sorsogon; Camarines Sur
- Coordinates: 11°05′19″N 124°38′21″E; 11°23′36″N 124°59′04″E; 12°34′01″N 124°16′29″E; 12°39′14″N 124°6′58″E; 13°36′40″N 123°14′19″E
- From: Leyte
- Passes through: San Juanico Strait
- To: Luzon

Ownership information
- Owner: National Power Corporation (August 10, 1998 – March 1, 2003); National Transmission Corporation (March 1, 2003–present)
- Operator: National Power Corporation (August 10, 1998 – March 1, 2003); National Transmission Corporation (March 1, 2003 – January 15, 2009); National Grid Corporation of the Philippines (January 15, 2009–present)

Construction information
- Cable manufacturer: ABB
- Cable installer: ABB
- Substation manufacturer: ABB
- Substation installer: ABB
- Commissioned: August 10, 1998; 28 years ago

Technical information
- Current type: HVDC
- Total length: 451 km (280 mi)
- Capacity: 440 MW
- DC voltage: 350 kV
- No. of poles: 1

HVDC Leyte–Luzon is a high-voltage direct current transmission link in the Philippines between geothermal power plants on the islands of Leyte and Luzon.

Abbreviated as 8LI1NAG-ORMOC, 8LI1NAG-ORMOC HVDC (with "HVDC" at end) and known as Ormoc-Naga HVDC transmission line.

== History ==
The feasibility study of the transmission project was conducted by the Japan International Cooperation Agency in 1981. The project financing was approved by World Bank in June 1994, co-financed also by the Japan Export-Import Bank. The HVDC Leyte–Luzon went in service on August 10, 1998. It is operated by the privately owned National Grid Corporation of the Philippines (NGCP) since January 15, 2009, and previously by government-owned companies National Transmission Corporation (TransCo) and National Power Corporation (NAPOCOR). It was owned previously by NAPOCOR from August 10, 1998, to March 1, 2003, and is owned currently by TransCo since March 1, 2003.

== Technical description ==
The transmission line is a triple-bundle power line and bipolar HVDC.

Capacity of the Leyte-Luzon is a 440 MW. It is implemented as monopolar line for a voltage of 350 kV, feeding the power grid in the Manila region. In addition to overall connection of grids, HVDC was chosen to enable supply of bulk geothermal power, and to stabilize the alternating current network in Manila region. The interconnector was manufactured by ABB in cooperation with Marubeni.

The length of submarine cable is 21 kilometers (13 mi) and the total length of overhead lines is 430 kilometers (270 mi).

The crossing of San Juanico Strait is realized as overhead crossing with a tower on an island in the strait.

By time in construction of the 1st tower ((8LI1NAG-ORMOC HVDC)0001) was erected and it is now commonly the first HVDC tower in the Philippines.

== Route ==
The HVDC Leyte–Luzon begins at Ormoc converter station (Leyte) and ends at Naga converter station (Camarines Sur). It consists three sections:

- Leyte-Samar overhead line
- submarine cables across San Bernardino Strait between Cabacungan (Allen, Samar) and Santa Magdalena (Sorsogon, Luzon)
- overhead line at Luzon

The grounding electrodes are situated at Albuera at 10°54′01″N 124°42′24″E and near Calabanga at 13°43′59″N 123°14′29″E . They are connected with the converter stations by 25 respectively 15-kilometre-long overhead lines. These lines are 69kV DC.
