= Therese Malvar =

Filipino actress (born 2000)

- Born: Therese Martin Alcala Malvar; September 16, 2000 (age 26); Calamba, Laguna, Philippines
- Other name: Teri Malvar
- Occupation: Actress
- Years active: 2013–present
- Agent: Sparkle GMA Artist Center (2013–present)

Therese Martin Alcala Malvar (born September 16, 2000), occasionally credited as Teri Malvar, is a Filipino actress known for her performances in independent films. She gained recognition for her debut in Ang Huling Cha-Cha ni Anita (2013), earning the Best Actress award at the 1st CineFilipino Film Festival at age 13. Malvar has since received multiple acting honors, both locally and internationally.

== Early life and education ==
Malvar was born Therese Martin Alcala Malvar on September 16, 2000. She is the daughter of stage and independent film actress Cherry Malvar. Malvar is also the third great-granddaughter of two Philippine heroes, General Miguel Malvar and Dr. José Rizal.

She made her film debut in Ang Huling Cha-Cha ni Anita after joining her mother at an audition at age 12, with no formal acting training prior to the project.

While filming Inagaw na Bituin, Malvar continued her high school studies and graduated as class salutatorian. In June 2024, she graduated magna cum laude with a Bachelor of Arts in Film and Video from MINT College.

== Career ==
Malvar made her film debut at age 13 in Ang Huling Cha-Cha ni Anita. In the film, she played the titular character, a 12-year-old girl who falls in love with an older woman. For her performance, she won Best Actress at the inaugural CineFilipino Film Festival, becoming the youngest recipient of the award. She earned the distinction over veteran nominees, including Nora Aunor. She also received a nomination for Best Actress at the 37th Gawad Urian Awards, New Movie Actress of the Year at the 30th PMPC Star Awards for Movies, and Best Breakthrough Performance by an Actress at the 11th Golden Screen Awards.

In 2015, Malvar portrayed the role of Jinky in Hamog, a role that earned her multiple local and international awards, including Best Actress at the 40th Moscow International Film Festival. In 2017, the Film Development Council of the Philippines awarded her with the Artistic Excellence Award. She also starred in the horror film Ilawod as the titular malicious water spirit. The following year, she tied with herself for the Best Supporting Actress award at the 14th Cinemalaya Independent Film Festival for her roles in School Service and Distance, the first time in Cinemalaya history that an actor tied with themselves in a single category.

In 2019, Malvar portrayed the lead role of Ariela Lopez in the drama series Inagaw na Bituin, a role that allowed her to showcase her singing talents. This was also her first leading role on television. In 2022, she portrayed Cynthia in the film Broken Blooms. For her role, she won Best Actress at the Saskatchewan International Film Festival. The same year, Malvar was also selected as a judge at the 2022 Tallinn Black Nights Film Festival.

In 2023, she starred in the socio-political film, Oras de Peligro. Malvar was also among the selected Philippine delegates for the ASEAN International Film Festival and Awards. In November, she made her Regal Studio Presents debut with the episode, "Baddest Best Friend".

In 2025, she joined the cast of Encantadia Chronicles: Sang'gre. She was also cast in Quezon and Bar Boys: After School that year. Malvar was also an associate producer on the documentary Food Delivery.

== Personal life ==
Since June 2026, Malvar has been engaged to filmmaker Jaime Morados.

== Filmography ==
=== Films ===
Year	Title	Role	Notes	Ref.
2013	Ang Huling Cha-Cha ni Anita	Anita	Credited as "Teri Malvar"; Won—1st CineFilipino Film Festival for Best Actress	
2014	Bitukang Manok	Danielle	Credited as "Teri Malvar"	
2014	Tumbang Preso	Jea	Credited as "Teri Malvar"	
2015	Child Haus		Credited as "Teri Malvar"	
2015	Hamog	Jinky	Won—40th Moscow International Film Festival for Best Actress	
2015	Matangtubig	Melody	Credited as "Teri Malvar"	
2016	Gasping for Air (1-2-3)	Reyna		
2016	Sud sa Ginhawaan	Teresa	Short film; credited as "Teri Malvar"	
2016	Sakaling Hindi Makarating	Sol	Entry for the CineFilipino 2016 Film Festival	
2017	Baconaua	Dian	Entry for the 13th Cinemalaya Independent Film Festival	
2017	Ilawod	Isla	Won—2nd EDDYS Award for Best Supporting Actress	
2017	Spirit of the Glass 2: The Haunted	Anita		
2018	School Service	Linda	Won—14th Cinemalaya Independent Film Festival for Best Supporting Actress (tied with herself)	
2018	Distance	Karla	Won—14th Cinemalaya Independent Film Festival for Best Supporting Actress (tied with herself)	
2022	Broken Blooms	Cynthia	Won—Saskatchewan International Film Festival for Best Actress	
2022	Ang Pagliligtas sa Dalagang Bukid	Atang de la Rama	Entry for the QCinema International Film Festival 2022	
2023	Oras de Peligro	Nerissa	Entry for the 11th Asian Film Festival Barcelona (AFFBCN)	
2024	Pushcart Tales	Emily	Entry for the Puregold CinePanalo Film Festival 2024	
2024	Guardia de Honor	Marie	Entry for the 46th Moscow International Film Festival	
2024	Lumang Tugtugin	Angela	Short film	
2025	Quezon	Nadia Hernando		
2025	Bar Boys: After School	CJ David	Entry for the 51st Metro Manila Film Festival	

=== Television ===
Year	Title	Role	Notes	Ref.
2013	My Husband's Lover	young Eulalia "Lally" Agatep		
2013	The Ryzza Mae Show	Herself / Guest	Guest appearance	
2014	Rhodora X	young Roxanne		
2015	Let the Love Begin	Lily	Credited as "Teri Malvar"	
2015	Karelasyon: Tres Rosas	young Maring		
2016	That's My Amboy	Maricar's Classmate	Season 1, Episode 7; uncredited	
2016	Maynila: Don't Give Up on Us	Tin-tin		
2016	Once Again	Lynnel Soriano		
2016	Oh, My Mama!	Peewee		
2017	Magpakailanman: Pag-ibig sa Likod ng Kababalaghan (The Chito and Daisy Mercader Story)	young Jessica Mercader	Season 1, Episode 203	
2017	Legally Blind	Nina Evangelista	Supporting Role	
2017	Wagas: Drug Runner		Season 1, Episode 191	
2017	Trops	Veronica "Nurse Ronnie / Nica" Sanchez	Recurring Role	
2017	Daig Kayo ng Lola Ko: Kristel (The Aswang Slayer)	Glody	Season 1, Episode 27	
2017	Wagas: Mata		Season 1, Episode 210	
2017	Kambal, Karibal	young Teresa Abaya	Season 1, Episode 5; uncredited	
2017	Tadhana: Pamana	Wena	Season 1, Episode 30	
2018	Wagas: Mukha ng Pag-ibig		Season 1, Episode 219	
2018	Imbestigador: Sipocot Rape-Slay Case	Jean Ivy Orea		
2018	Magpakailanman: My Sister, My Lover	Ayani	Season 1, Episode 259	
2018	Imbestigador: Babae sa Sementeryo	Shaynadyn Alejo	Credited as "Teri Malvar"	
2018	Imbestigador: Secret Admirer	Margie		
2018	Inday Will Always Love You	young Amanda Melendez	Uncredited	
2018	Dear Uge: Basta Dubber, Sweet Lover	Marielle	Season 1, Episode 129	
2019	Kaibigan Special Sunday	Various Roles		
2019	Inagaw na Bituin	Ariela Lopez	Lead Role	
2019	Dragon Lady	Steffi (Scarlet's Beshie)		
2019	Dear Uge: Kabitana	Melissa	Episode 1, 167	
2019—2020	Beautiful Justice	Hershey Bernardo	Supporting Role	
2021	Babawiin Ko ang Lahat	Lalaine "Lala" Vasquez	Supporting Role	
2021	Dear Uge: Community Panthief	Monique	Season 1, Episode 221	
2022	Little Princess	Masoy	Supporting Role	
2022	Unica Hija	young Cara Orosco	Guest Role	
2023	Luv Is: Love at First Read	Abigail "Gail" Garcia	Episode 1-35	
2023	Regal Studio Presents: Baddest Best Friend	Mylene	Season 9, Episode 11	
2025	Encantadia Chronicles: Sang'gre	Dina Villaroman	Supporting Role	
2026	Kamao	Jolina "Jolly" Morales	Supporting Role	

=== Producer ===
Year	Title	Notes	Ref.
2025	Food Delivery	Associate producer	

== Accolades ==
=== Film and television awards ===
Award	Year	Category	Nominated work	Result	Ref.
CineFilipino Film Festival	2013	Best Actress	Ang Huling Cha-Cha ni Anita	Won	
Cinemalaya Independent Film Festival	2018	Best Supporting Actress	Distance	Won	
Cinemalaya Independent Film Festival	2018	Best Supporting Actress	School Service	Won	
Cinema One Originals	2015	Best Actress	Hamog	Won	
CinePanalo Film Festival	2024	Best Actress (Panalong Aktres)	Pushcart Tales	Nominated	
CinePanalo Film Festival	2024	Best Ensemble (Panalong Ensemble)	Pushcart Tales	Won	
The EDDYs	2018	Best Supporting Actress	Ilawod	Won	
Gawad PASADO	2014	PinakaPASADOng Aktres	Ang Huling Cha-Cha ni Anita	Nominated	
Gawad PASADO	2019	PinakaPASADOng Katuwang na Aktres	School Service	Nominated	
Gawad PASADO	2023	PinakaPASADOng Aktres	Broken Blooms	Nominated	
Gawad PASADO	2026	PinakaPASADOng Katuwang na Aktres	Quezon	Pending	
Gawad Tanglaw Awards	2019	Best Supporting Actress	School Service	Won	
Gawad Urian Award	2014	Best Actress	Ang Huling Cha-Cha ni Anita	Nominated	
Golden Screen Awards	2014	Breakthrough Performance by an Actress	Ang Huling Cha-Cha ni Anita	Nominated	
Laguna Excellence Awards	2019	Indie Film Actress of the Year	School Service	Won	
Mokkho International Film Festival	2022	Critics Choice Award for Best Actress in an Indie	Broken Blooms	Won	
38th Moscow International Film Festival	2016	Silver St. George Best Actress	Hamog	Won	
15th New York Asian Film Festival	2016	Screen International Rising Star Asia Award	Hamog	Won	
Northern Virginia International Film and Music Festival	2018	Best Actress - Feature Film	Gasping for Air	Nominated	
PMPC Star Awards for Movies	2014	New Movie Actress of the Year	Ang Huling Cha-Cha ni Anita	Nominated	
PMPC Star Awards for Movies	2018	Movie Supporting Actress of the Year	Ilawod	Nominated	
PMPC Star Awards for Movies	2019	Movie Supporting Actress of the Year	Distance	Nominated	
PMPC Star Awards for Movies	2024	Movie Actress of the Year	Broken Blooms	Nominated	
PMPC Star Awards for Movies	2024	Movie Love Team of the Year	Broken Blooms	Nominated	
PMPC Star Awards for Movies	2025	Indie Movie Ensemble Acting of the Year	Pushcart Tales	Nominated	
PMPC Star Awards for Television	2025	Best Single Performance by An Actress	Magpakailanman: Bayad Utang	Nominated	
Saskatchewan International Film Festival	2022	Best Lead Actress	Broken Blooms	Won	
Shanghai International Festival	2016	Outstanding Artistic Achievement Golden Goblet Award	Hamog	Won	
7th Urduja Heritage Film Awards	2020	Best Young Actress	Distance	Won	

=== Honors and state recognition ===
Organization	Year	Award/Honor	Result	Ref.
Film Development Council of the Philippines	2017	Artistic Excellence Award	Honored	
Inquirer Indie Bravo!	2016	Award of Distinction	Honored	
National Commission for Culture and the Arts	2017	Ani ng Dangal – Cinema	Honored	
