= Yvette Tan =

Filipino author

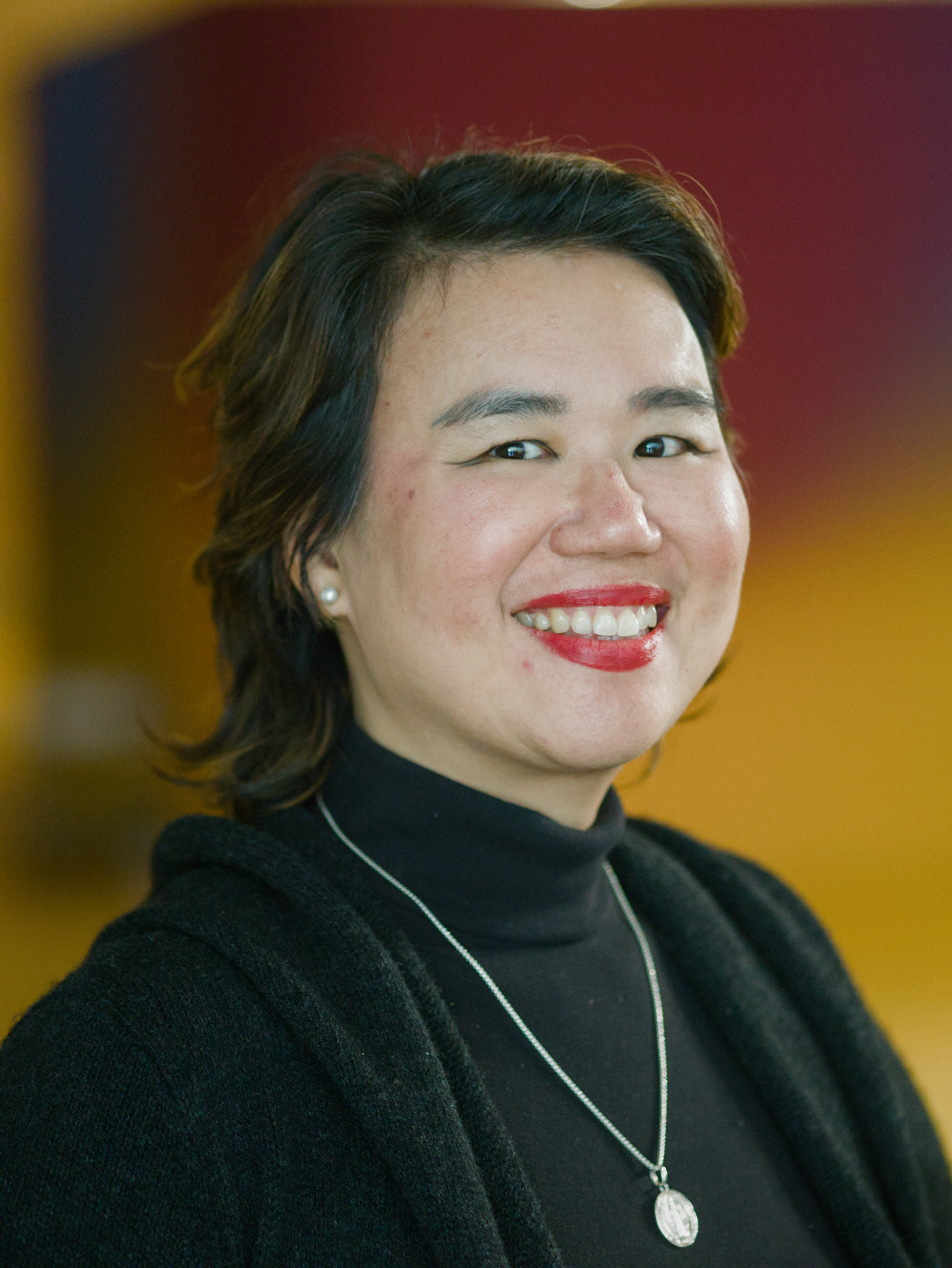
Tan at the book fair Frankfurt 2025

Tan at FilBookFest in San Francisco 2026

Yvette Natalie Uy Tan (born February 11, 1975) is a Filipino author known as one of the Philippines' "most celebrated horror fiction writers." Her literary work has won Don Carlos Palanca and Philippine Graphic/Fiction awards. She is also known for having written the screenplay for the 2017 independent film Ilawod, which received five nominations for the 2018 Star Awards for Movies.
