= Kyline Alcantara =

Filipino actress (born 2002)

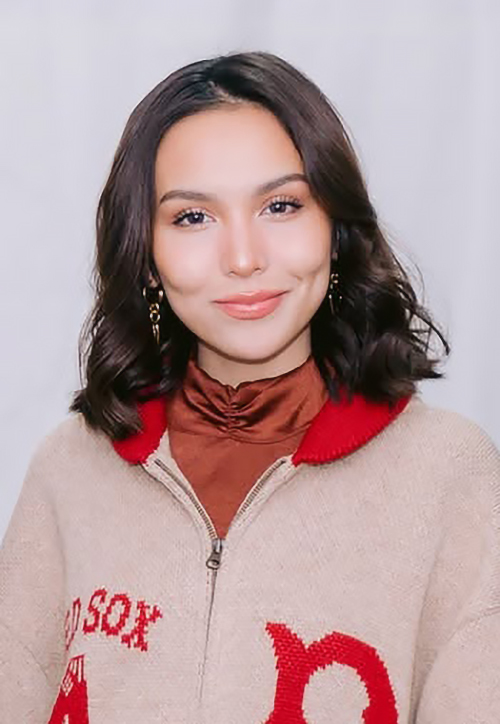
- Alcantara in July 2025
- Born: Kyline Nicole Aquino Alcantara; September 3, 2002 (age 24); Ocampo, Camarines Sur, Philippines
- Occupations: Singer; actress; dancer; host; podcaster
- Years active: 2009–present
- Agents: Star Magic (2010–2017); Sparkle GMA Artist Center (2017–present)

Kyline Nicole Aquino Alcantara (Tagalog: [kɐjˈlin ʔɐlˌkaːn.tɐˈɾa]; born September 3, 2002) is a Filipino actress and singer. She began her career as a child actress after finishing top ten in the talent search program Star Circle Quest. She is best known for her roles in Kambal, Karibal (2017) and Bilangin ang Bituin sa Langit (2020). Her accolades include a Star Award for Television and a Box Office Entertainment Award, in addition to nominations for an Awit Award and Asian Academy Creative Awards.

== Early life and education ==
Kyline Nicole Aquino Alcantara Manga, (Note: The Philippine Star reported her full name Kyline Nicole Aquino Alcantara while GMA Integrated News added her paternal family name Manga.) the youngest of three siblings, was born on September 3, 2002, in Ocampo, Camarines Sur, Philippines. Her parents separated when Alcantara was four years old but later reconciled with each other after 10 years.

Alcantara attended Saint Francis of Assisi College for her primary education and later attended Academy of Christian Excellence Montessori for two years of high school before moving into Exodus Elementary School. Drawn to the Armed Forces of the Philippines' strength, Alcantara said she wanted to enlist in the military, a job they did not offer.

At age seven, she gained attention from show business instead after participating in theatrical plays. Before auditioning as a cast member in Goin' Bulilit (2005–2009), Alcantara's family traveled to ABS-CBN Broadcasting Center in Diliman, Quezon City, where they arrived too late and noticed auditions had ended.

== Career ==
=== 2010–2020: Early roles and breakthrough ===
Alcantara made her television debut in the 2010 talent show Star Circle Quest: Search for the Next Kiddie Superstars, in which she qualified to the top ten before being the first contestant to be eliminated from the show. In 2013, Alcantara costarred opposite Andrea Brillantes in the remake of GMA Network's Anna Liza (1980–1985), titled Annaliza. At her audition for the show, she immediately secured the villainous role. In a 2020 retrospective, Alcantara said her craftsmanship influenced the show, having acting lessons from costars Zanjoe Marudo, Kaye Abad, Denise Laurel, and director Theodore Boborol. Her next supporting roles were Jessa Boborol in Pangako Sa 'Yo (2015–2016) and Chloe in Born for You (2016). Alcantara made her cinema debut with minor roles in 2015 films Hamog and Etiquette for Mistresses.

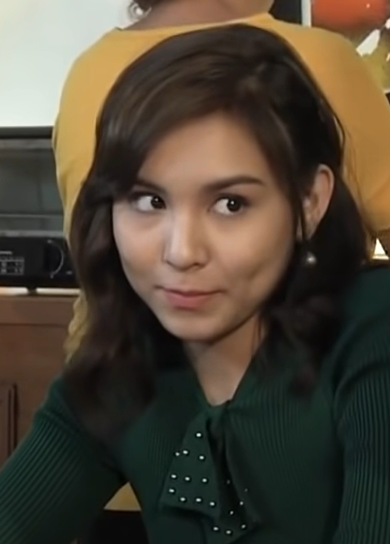
Alcantara in 2018

Alcantara's breakthrough in her career happened when she appeared as Cheska De Villa, a villain, in the television series Kambal, Karibal (2017–2018). She initially auditioned for either of her minor or supporting roles in the series, especially that of a younger version of Teresa (Jean Garcia). When GMA Network executives discovered that Alcantara's acting was decent, they convinced her to return for her different role. Her costars in the series, including Bianca Umali, Miguel Tanfelix, Pauline Mendoza, and Jeric Gonzales, presented her with new acting experiences. Alcantara's performance, which won her a PMPC Star Award for Television and received her an Asian Academy Creative Award nomination, was lauded by viewers and proved to be her breakthrough role.

Alcantara cohosted two variety shows in 2018: Sunday PinaSaya and Studio 7, and released her debut album Kyline that September. In 2019, she portrayed Anna Sevilla / Elsa Dela Cruz, the daughter of Edward Sevilla (Marvin Agustin) and Belinda Lopez (Sunshine Dizon) who was previously suffered from amnesia, in the musical series Inagaw na Bituin. In preparation, Alcantara read scripts that were inherent and watched videos about acting. Her next film role was in Julius Alfonso's Black Lipstick (2019) alongside Migo Adecer, Manolo Pedrosa, and Kate Valdez. Rappler critic Oggs Cruz criticized the film's complicated, unfocused scope, describing it as "old-fashioned". Alcantara made a part in the variety show All-Out Sundays since 2020. Bilangin ang Bituin sa Langit was her next project that year.

=== 2021–present: Transition to mature roles ===
Alcantara appeared in three television series in 2021. She had a guest role in an episode of the anthology series Magpakailanman as an Overseas Filipino Worker who was imprisoned for rape. Transitioning to mature roles was new to Alcantara, given "how strong of a woman she is". She received a PMPC Star Award for Best Single Performance by an Actress nomination. Alcantara starred in the installment #Future of the anthology I Can See You, in which she played a depressive and enigmatic woman. I Left My Heart in Sorsogon, a romantic drama, was her final series that year.

== Public image and personal life ==
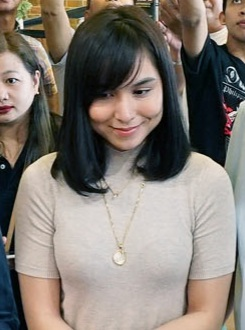
Alcantara in 2019

Francesca Testa of Mega took note of her energetic and "amusing personality". Krista Garcia of Preview.ph commented on her "determined optimism", identifying an extent of "typical carefree hopefulness" to her status and adding, "She's certain that her destiny is to be a big star, not because it has been handed to her, but because she knows that she will do whatever it takes to earn it."

Alcantara had difficulties with acne, missing roles, her family life, finances, and rejection from auditions. She is an ambassador for companies Converse and Ever Bilena, and agencies SOS Children's Villages and the Korea Tourism Organization (KTO). Alcantara's purpose of the KTO is to maintain South Korea a "top-of-mind tourist destination for Filipinos".

Alcantara was in a relationship with singer Darren Espanto for a year, and later actor Mavy Legaspi from 2021 to 2023. She began dating basketball player Kobe Paras in 2024, but they broke up in April 2025.

== Filmography ==
=== Film ===
Kyline Alcantara's film credits
Year	Title	Role	Notes	Ref.
2015	Hamog	Super Girl		
2015	Etiquette for Mistresses	Charley's daughter		
2019	Black Lipstick	Ikay		
2024	Miss Legends	Lucia		

=== Television ===
Kyline Alcantara's television credits
Year	Title	Role	Ref.
2010–2011	Star Circle Quest: Search for the Next Kiddie Superstars	Herself	
2012	Precious Hearts Romances: Lumayo Ka Man Sa Akin	Young Janine Del Castillo	
2012	Ina, Kapatid, Anak	Young Margaux Marasigan	
2013–2014	Annaliza	Arlene Benedicto	
2015–2016	Pangako Sa 'Yo	Jessa Boborol	
2016	Born for You	Chloe Sebastian	
2017	Wildflower	Young Emilia Ardiente	
2017–2018	Kambal, Karibal	Francheska "Cheska" de Villa / Grace Akeem Nazar	
2017–2019	Sunday PinaSaya	Herself	
2018	Dear Uge: Twin Kasama Kita	Anna / Mae	
2018	Inday Will Always Love You	Leslie Anne	
2018–2019	Studio 7	Herself	
2019	Inagaw na Bituin	Anna Sevilla / Elsa Dela Cruz	
2020–present	All-Out Sundays	Herself	
2020–2021	Bilangin ang Bituin sa Langit	Margarita "Maggie" Santos	
2021	Magpakailanman	Krizza	
2021	I Can See You: #Future	Lara Dacer	
2021–2022	I Left My Heart in Sorsogon	Tiffany Wenceslao	
2023	Zero Kilometers Away	Gwen Daphne	
2023	Luv Is: Love at First Read	Angelika Bianca "AB" C. De Makapili	
2023–present	It's Showtime	Herself	
2024–2025	Shining Inheritance	Joanna Dela Costa	
2025	Beauty Empire	Shari de Jesus	
2026–present	Taskforce Firewall	Callie Sandoval	
2026	Love, Siargao	Pearl	

=== Podcast ===
Year	Title	Notes	Platform	Ref.
2022	MavLine on Me	with Mavy Legaspi	Spotify	

== Discography ==
=== Studio albums ===
Title	Label	Released	Ref(s)
Kyline	GMA Records	September 19, 2018	

== Awards and nominations ==
Awards and nominations received by Kyline Alcantara
Award	Year (Note: Indicates the year of ceremony. Each year is linked to the article about the awards held that year, wherever possible.)	Category	Nominated work	Result	Ref.
Aliw Awards	2018	Best New Artist of The Year (Female)	—N/a	Nominated	
Asian Academy Creative Awards (Note: Covers non-web-only entities and excludes national winners)	2018	Best Actress in a Supporting Role	Kambal, Karibal	Nominated	
Awit Awards	2019	Music Video of the Year	"Fake Love"	Nominated	
Box Office Entertainment Awards	2019	Promising Female Concert Performer of the Year	—N/a	Won	
Myx Music Awards	2019	New Artist of the Year	—N/a	Nominated	
PMPC Star Awards for Television	2018	Best Drama Supporting Actress	Kambal, Karibal	Won	
PMPC Star Awards for Television	2023	Best Single Performance by an Actress	Magpakailanman (Episode: "Rape Victim, Ikinulong?")	Nominated	
