= San Juanico Strait =

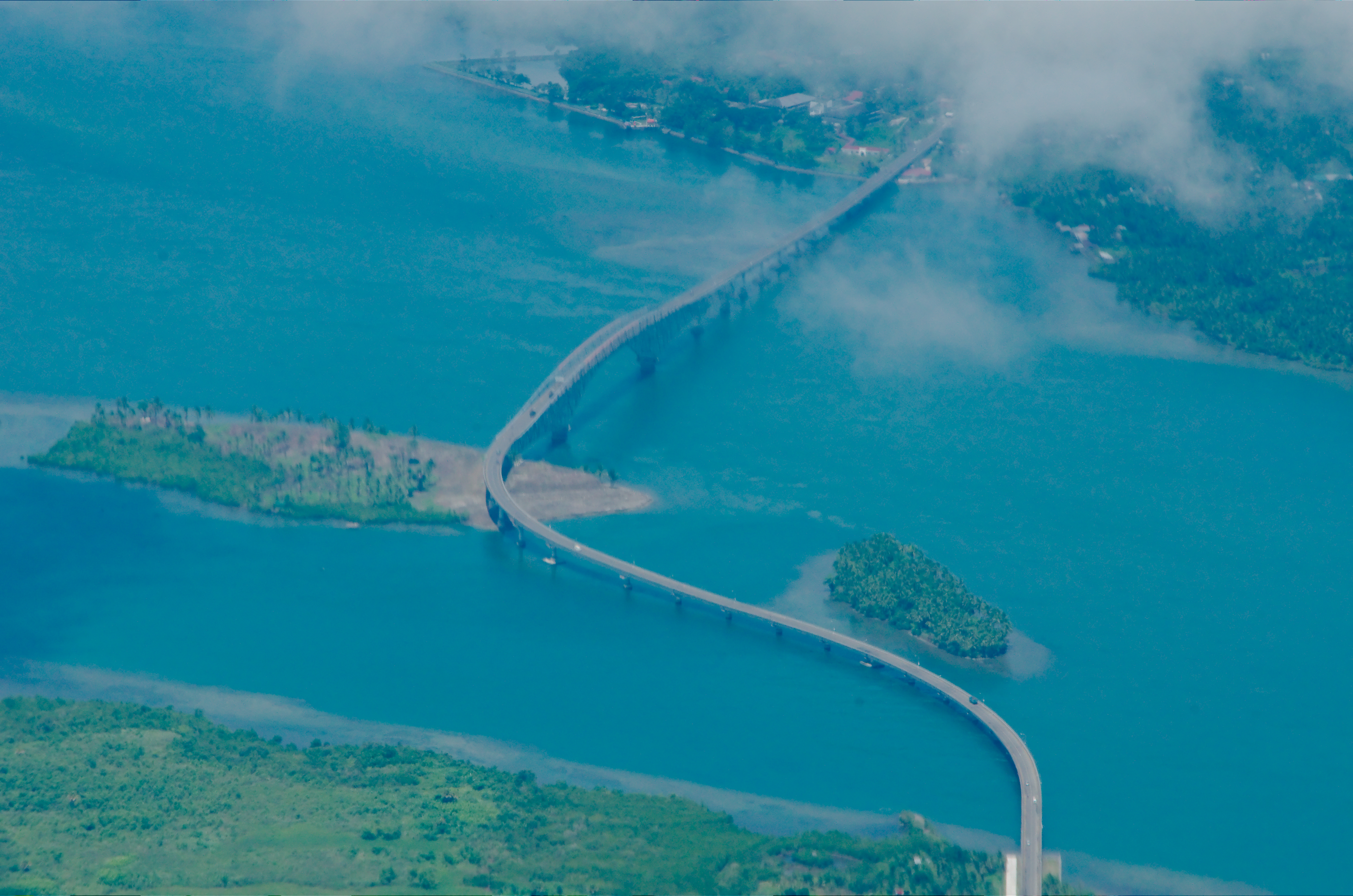
- Aerial view of the San Juanico Bridge over the strait

- Location within the Philippines San Juanico Strait (Philippines)
- Location: Samar; Leyte
- Coordinates: 11°20′25″N 124°58′42″E
- Type: strait

San Juanico Strait (Waray: Sulang han San Juanico) is a narrow strait in the Eastern Visayan region in the Philippines. It separates the islands of Samar and Leyte and connects Carigara Bay (Samar Sea) with the San Pedro Bay (Leyte Gulf). It is about 38 kilometres (24 mi) long. At its narrowest point, the strait is only 2 kilometers (1.2 mi) wide.

The strait is crossed by the San Juanico Bridge. The HVDC Leyte–Luzon power line also crosses the strait through an overhead line at 11°23′36″N 124°59′04″E, using a tower on an uninhabited island in the strait. The Tacloban City harbor, the main port of the Eastern Visayas, is on Cancabato Bay at the southern entrance of the strait.

== Gallery ==
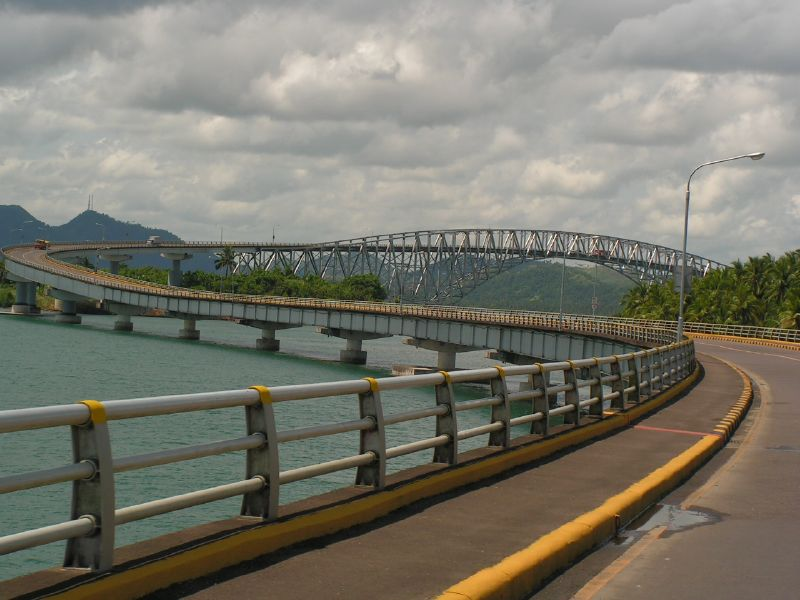
View of the San Juanico Bridge over the strait, looking southeastward.

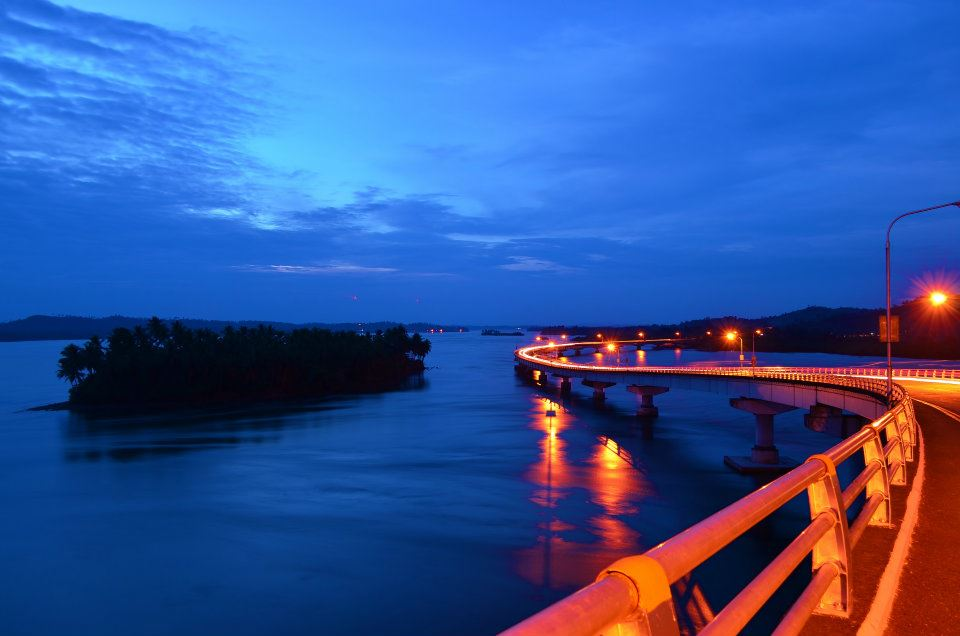
The San Juanico Bridge at night.

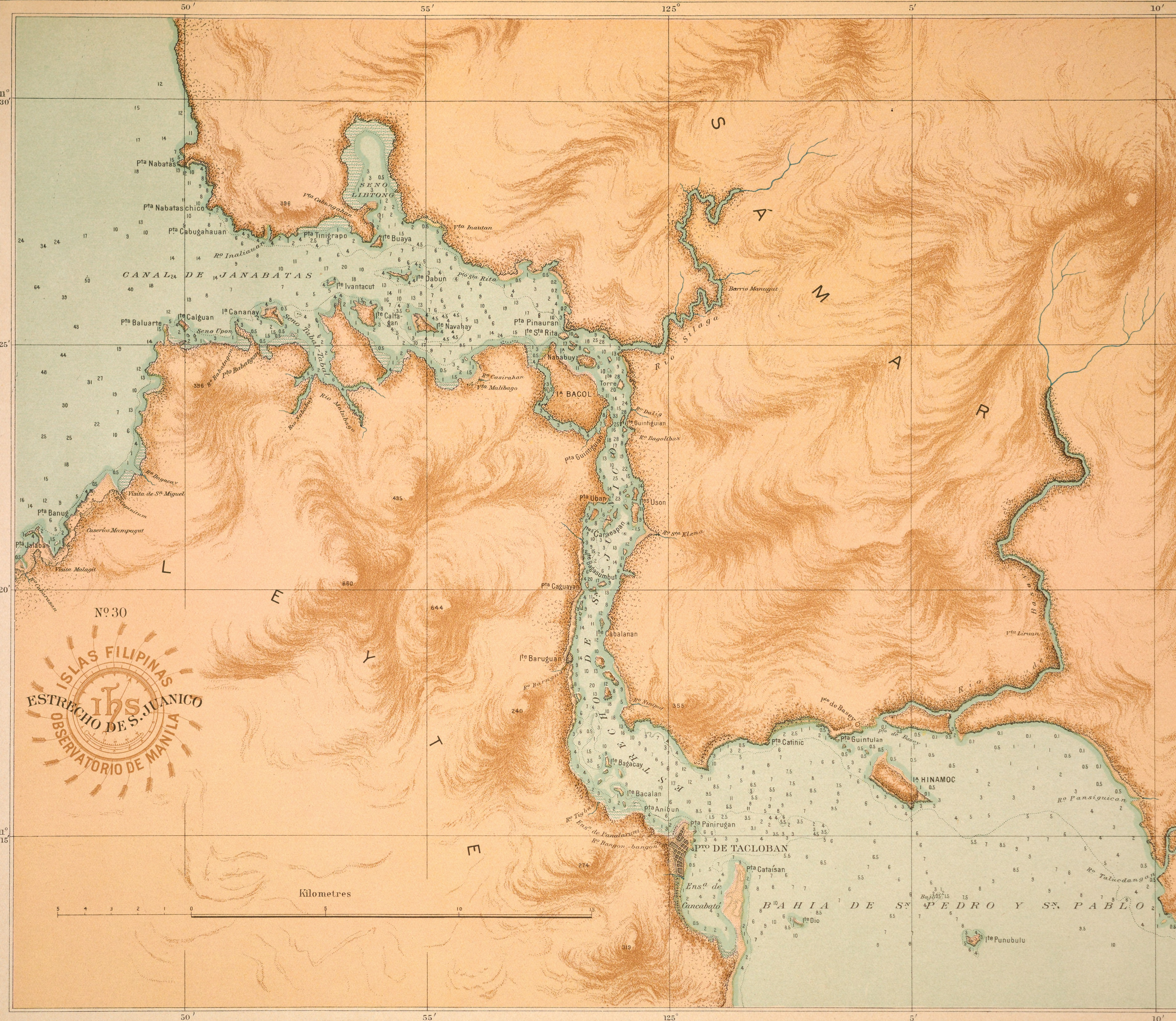
1900 map of the strait.
