= List of Alden Richards performances =

The following is a list of performances and contributions by Filipino actor-producer and director Alden Richards to local and International movies and television industry.

== Film ==
Year	Title	Role	Notes	Ref.
2011	Tween Academy: Class of 2012	Christian	Debut film	
2011	The Road	Teenage Luis	Released in the United States by Freestyle Releasing	
2011	Ang Panday 2	Hubli	37th Metro Manila Film Festival entry	
2012	Sosy Problems	Iñaki	38th Metro Manila Film Festival entry	
2012	Si Agimat, Si Enteng at Ako	Fino	38th Metro Manila Film Festival entry	
2013	10,000 Hours	Young Gabriel Molino Alcaraz	39th Metro Manila Film Festival entry	
2014	Kinabukasan (The Day After)	Niles	Short film by Adolfo Alix Jr.	
2015	My Bebe Love: #KiligPaMore	Dondi Talatala	41st Metro Manila Film Festival entry Lead actor	
2016	Imagine You and Me	Andrew Garcia	Lead actor	
2016	Enteng Kabisote 10 and the Abangers	Richard	Special participation	
2017	Alaala: A Martial Law Special	Boni Ilagan	Lead actor	
2017	Trip Ubusan: The Lolas vs. Zombies	Charmaine's father	Special participation Voice role	
2017	Meant to Beh	Gruber passenger	43rd Metro Manila Film Festival entry Cameo role	
2019	Hello, Love, Goodbye	Ethan Del Rosario	Third Highest Grossing Filipino Film of All Time; Lead actor	
2023	Five Breakups and a Romance	Lance Sandoval	Lead actor Co-producer; Guest director (uncredited)	
2023	Family of Two	Mateo Alfredo De Dios	49th Metro Manila Film Festival entry Lead actor	
2024	Hello, Love, Again	Ethan Del Rosario	Highest Grossing Filipino Film of All Time; Lead actor	
2025	Eraserheads: Combo on the Run	Himself	Eraserheads documentary	
2025	A Queen's Runway	Miss Universe Host / Emcee	Miss Universe Philippines documentary Cameo role	
2025	Prisoner of War	—	Executive producer International film	
2025	Out Of Order	Atty. Alex Roman	Lead actor Director; Co-producer and co-scriptwriter (story)	
TBA	Big Tiger	John Lynch	Co-producer; International film	
TBA	The Cassandra Project: Busy Body	—	Executive producer International film	

== Television ==
=== Television series ===
Year	Title	Role	Ref.
2011	Alakdana	Joma Perez	
2011–2012	Reel Love Presents: Tween Hearts	Dennis	
2012	My Beloved	Rico Castor	
2012	One True Love	Tisoy Bulaong	
2013	Indio	Young Simeon	
2013	Mundo Mo'y Akin	Jerome Alvarez	
2014	Carmela: Ang Pinakamagandang Babae sa Mundong Ibabaw	Santiago "Yago" Torres-Flores	
2014	Ilustrado	José Rizal	
2015	Pari 'Koy	Young Kokoy	
2016	Encantadia	Lakan	
2017	Destined to be Yours	Benjamin "Benjie" Rosales	
2017	Kapuso Movie Festival: Fantastic Four	Mr. Fantastic / Dr. Reed Richards; Voice role dubbed in tagalog	
2018	Victor Magtanggol	Victor Magtanggol / Hammer Man	
2019–2020	The Gift	Joseph "Sep" Apostol	
2020	I Can See You: Love on the Balcony	Iñigo "Gio" Mapa	
2021–2022	The World Between Us	Luisito "Louie" Asuncion	
2022	Start-Up PH	Tristan "Good Boy" Hernandez	
2024	Pulang Araw	Eduardo Dela Cruz	
2026	Love, Siargao	Jao Calderon	
TBA	Code Grey	Dr. Greyson Lazaro	

=== TV Special ===
Year	Title	Role	Ref.
2015	GMA New Year countdown	Co-host - performer	
2016	The Magic of Christmas - GMA Christmas special	Performer	
2016	Lipad Kapuso - Kapuso New Year countdown	Performer	
2017	Paskong Kapuso - Kapuso Christmas special	Performer	
2017	Boung Puso para sa Kapuso - GMA New Year countdown	Performer	
2018	Puso ng Pasko - GMA Christmas special	Performer	
2018	Eat Bulaga: The 40th Anniversary special	Co-host - performer	
2019	GMA 70th Anniversary New Year countdown	Performer	
2021	All Out Sunday Kicks off GMA's 71st Anniversary Special	Co-host - performer	
2025	Beyond 75: The GMA 75th Anniversary Special	Performer	

=== Guest appearance in Various Anthology ===
Year	Title	Role	Ref.
2011	Spooky Nights	Various roles	
2012	Tanikala: "Ang Ikaapat na Yugto-Unos"	Angelo	
2012; 2013; 2015	Maynila	Various roles	
2013	Bingit	Symon Jhon Riego	
2013; 2014; 2015; 2017; 2023	Magpakailanman	Various roles	
2013; 2014	Wagas	Various roles	
2015; 2017	Wish Ko Lang	Various roles	
2015	APT Entertainment Lenten Presentation: "Pag-uwi"	Sam Carbonel	
2015	Karelasyon: "Talent"	Adrian	
2015	Vampire ang Daddy Ko	Den-Den	
2016	Eat Bulaga! Lenten Special: "God Gave Me You"	James Esteban	
2016	Pepito Manaloto	Himself	
2017	Eat Bulaga! Lenten Special: "Kapatid"	Franco	
2017	Love Is...	Marco	
2017; 2018; 2019	Daig Kayo ng Lola Ko	Various roles	
2017; 2019	Dear Uge	Various roles	
2018	Eat Bulaga! Lenten Special: "Haligi Ng Pangarap"	Andrei	
2018	Eat Bulaga!: Pamana	balot vendor	
2019	Daddy's Gurl	Aldrich Reyes	
2019	Eat Bulaga! Lenten Special: "Bulawan"	Makoy	
2019	APT Entertainment Lenten Presentation: "The Journey"	Adrian Sarmiento	

=== Guest appearance in TV shows ===
Year	Title	Role	Ref.
2009, 2015, 2019	StarStruck season 5	Contestant	
2009, 2015, 2019	StarStruck season 6	Himself	
2009, 2015, 2019	StarStruck season 7	Himself	
2010	Pinoy Big Brother: Teen Clash 2010	Contestant	
2012, 2015, 2016, 2018	Idol sa Kusina	Himself	
2013	The Ryzza Mae Show	Himself	
2013	Chef Boy Logro: Kusina Master	Himself	
2013	Taste Buddies	Himself	
2013, 2014, 2017	Sarap, 'Di Ba?	Himself	
2014	Road Trip	Himself	
2014, 2015, 2017, 2018	Celebrity Bluff	Himself	
2016	Yan ang Morning!	Himself	
2016	Lip Sync Battle	Contestant	
2016	Physique TV: A Lifestyle TV channel in U.A.E.	Himself	
2016	BBC News	featured	
2016, 2019	Tonight with Arnold Clavio	Himself	
2017	Heart to Heart with Cardinal Tagle	Himself	
2017	Full House Tonight	Himself	
2017; 2019, 2023	Unang Hirit	Himself	
2019	The Lolas' Beautiful Show	Himself	
2019	Umagang Kay Ganda	Himself	
2019	Studio 7	Himself	
2019	Magandang Buhay	Himself	
2019	Cinema One	Himself	
2019	The Boobay and Tekla Show	Himself	
2019	Tonight with Boy Abunda	Himself	
2019, 2020, 2021, 2022	Mars	Himself	
2022, 2023, 2024, 2025	Family Feud	Contestant	
2023	Miss Filipina International Pageant	Judge	
2023	TiktoClock	Himself	
2023–2024	ASAP	Himself	
2023–2024	It's Showtime	Himself	
2023–2024	Fast Talk with Boy Abunda	Himself	
2024	Rainbow Rumble	Contestant	
2024	The Filipino Channel: BRGY	Himself	
2024	Kapuso Mo, Jessica Soho	Himself	
2024	GMA Pinoy TV	Himself	
2025	E! Talk - Canadian TV channel	featured	

=== Hosting ===
Year	Title	Notes	Ref.
2011–2013	Party Pilipinas	Co-host	
2013–2015	Sunday All Stars	Co-host	
2013	My Myx	Host / Celebrity VJ	
2014	Bet ng Bayan	Co-host	
2015–2023	Eat Bulaga!	Co-host	
2015–2019	Sunday PinaSaya	Co-host	
2016	21st Asian Television Awards	Co-host	
2020	Lockdown: Food Diaries	Main host	
2020–2021	Centerstage	Main host	
2020–Present	All-Out Sundays	Main host	
2023	Miss Universe Philippines 2023	Main host	
2023	Battle of the Judges	Main host	
2024	40th PMPC Star Awards for Movies	Co-host	
2024	FDCP’s “Parangal ng Sining”	Main host	
2024	Miss Universe Philippines 2024	Main host	
2025	38th PMPC Star Awards for Television	Co-host	
2025-Present	Stars on the Floor	Main host	

=== Web series ===
Year	Title	Role	Notes	Ref.
2024	Mowelfund sessions	Director/co-host	3 episodes, awareness campaign	

== Online game ==
E-sports events

Year	Title	Notes	Ref.
2018	Mobile Legends: Bang Bang LIGA	Shoutcaster	
2022	Battle of the Legends: Mobile Legends Tournament	E-sports player (guest)	
2023	Mobile Legends Myriad Cup Tournament	Director/producer	
2023	Mobile Legends Masters S1 Tournament	Director/producer	
