= Alden Richards discography =

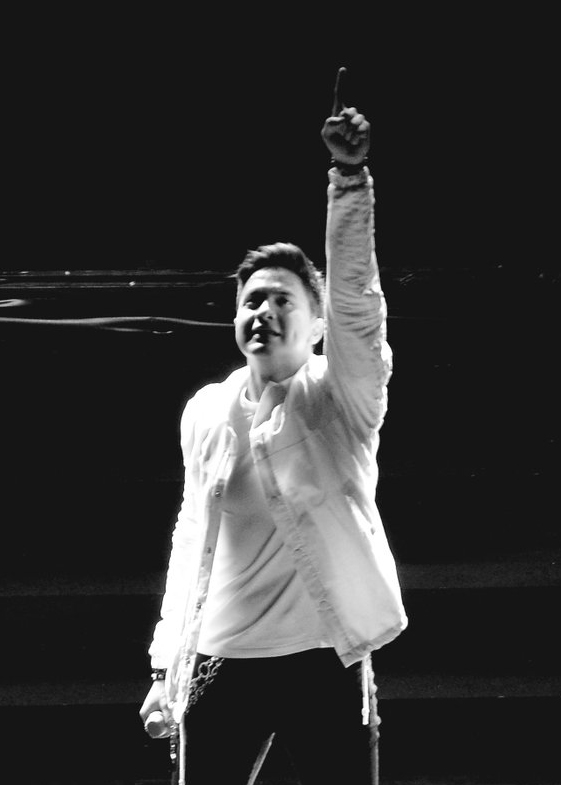
- Richards in 2017
- Studio albums: 4
- Soundtrack albums: 2
- Compilation albums: 3
- Singles: 5
- Music videos: 5
- Promotional singles: 3

Filipino singer-actor Alden Richards has released four studio albums, two soundtrack albums, three compilation albums and eight singles.

After signing with Universal Records Philippines in 2013, he released his first single Haplos, a revival Shamrock song on April 5, 2013, which debut at number one on My Music Store Philippines chart. Haplos became an official soundtrack in the television series Mundo Mo'y Akin. He released his debut EP Alden Richards on May 26, 2013. The album continued to top the iTunes PH charts two years later, after it was initially released. It also entered and peaked at number ten of Billboard World Albums chart for a week on October 17, 2015. His debut album was certified platinum by Philippine Association of the Record Industry (PARI).

In August 2015, Richards signed a recording contract with GMA Music. He released his second single Wish I May, an original composition of Agat Obar-Morallo. His second single was a commercial success which debut at number one on iTunes PH charts in September 2015, and was certified platinum by PARI. Following the release of his single, he launched his second album with the same title Wish I May which was released on October 17, 2015. It peaked at number eight of Billboard US Heatseeker-Pacific charts. His sophomore album is one of the best selling albums in the Philippines, having sold 150,000 thousand copies. He received a Diamond Record award from Philippine Association of the Record Industry (PARI) for the album.

In September 2016, he released his third single Rescue Me from his third studio album Say it Again. His third album was certified gold by PARI. Richards released another single I will be here from his fourth album Until I See You Again in 2018. His fourth album debut at number one on iTunes PH Albums charts. Richards was featured artist in several songs including Superhero Mo, a hip-hop song which was composed and sang by Ex-battalion for Victor Magtanggol series, where Richards performed rap-singing verses on the track.

== Discography ==
=== Studio albums ===
Title	Album details	Sales	Certifications
Alden Richards	Released: May 26, 2013; Label: Universal Records; Formats: CD, digital download, streaming	PHI: 15,000+	PARI: Platinum
Alden Richards	Released: November 28, 2015; Label: Universal Records; Formats: Special edition CD		
Wish I May	Released: October 17, 2015; Label: GMA Music; Formats: CD, digital download, streaming	PHI: 150,000+	PARI: Diamond
Say It Again	Released: October 2016; Label: GMA Music; Formats: CD, digital download, streaming	PHI: 7,500+	PARI: Gold
Until I See You Again	Released: September 28, 2018; Label: GMA Music; Formats: CD, digital download, streaming		

=== Soundtrack albums ===
Title	Album details
Tween Academy: Class of 2012 (Soundtrack)	Released: 2011; Label: GMA Music; Formats: CD, digital download
Imagine You and Me (Original Motion Picture Soundtrack)	Released: 2016; Label: APT / GMA Music; Format: Digital download

=== Compilation albums ===
Title	Album details
One More Try: Favorite Teleserye Love Songs & Other OPM Hits	Released: 2014; Label: Universal Records; Formats: CD, digital download
#AldubIsForever	Released: 2015; Label: Universal Records; Formats: CD, digital download
Songs of Worship, Prayer and Inspiration	Released: 2020; Label: GMA Music; Formats: Digital download

=== Singles ===
Title	Year	Certifications	Album
"Haplos"	2013		Alden Richards
"Naalala Ka"	2015		Alden Richards
"Wish I May"	2015	PARI: Platinum	Wish I May
"Rescue Me"	2016		Say It Again
"I Will Be Here"	2018		Until I See You Again

=== Other singles ===
Title	Year	Album	Notes
"MaGMAhalan Tayo Ngayong Pasko"	2015	Non-album single	GMA Network Christmas station ID Song
"Imagine You and Me (Version 2)" (Duet with Maine Mendoza)"	2016	Imagine You and Me (Original Motion Picture Soundtrack)	Imagine You and Me soundtrack
"Goin' Crazy"	2020	Non-album single	As promotional single

=== As featured artist ===
Title	Year	Notes
"Bangon Kaibigan" by Kapuso Stars	2013	It is composed by Janno Gibbs and arranged by Paulo Zarate.; The proceeds of the song was donated to victims of Typhoon Haiyan via GMA Kapuso Foundation.
"Puso ng Saya: 1000 Voices" by Kapuso Stars	2017	Sunday PinaSaya soundtrack.
"Ipadama ang #PusongPasko" by Kapuso Stars	2018	GMA Network Christmas song (CSID)
""Superhero Mo" by Ex-battalion feat. Alden Richards	2018	Victor Magtanggol soundtrack, composed by Ex-battalion. Richard performed rap-sing verses on this track.
"Love Shines" by Kapuso Stars	2019	GMA Network Christmas song (CSID)
"We Heal As One" by Various Singers	2020	It is composed by Ryan Cayabyab and written by Flor Quintos. The original lyrics were re-written in response to COVID-19.

== Videography ==
=== Music videos ===
Title	Year	Album
"Haplos"	2013	Alden Richards
"Wish I May"	2015	Wish I May
"Rescue Me"	2016	Say It Again
"Your Guardian Angel"	2017	Say It Again
"I Will Be Here"	2018	Until I See You Again
"Kapag Malapit ka"	2021	Until I See You Again

=== Guest appearances ===
Title	Year	Artist(s)	Album
"Basta't Nandito Ka"	2014	Jennylyn Mercado	Never Alone
"Kapangyarihan Ng Pag-Ibig"	2015	Aicelle Santos	Liwanag
