= Wish I May =

Wish I May may refer to:

- Wish I May (EP), a 2015 album by Alden Richards, and "Wish I May", the carrier single of the album
- "Wish I May", a song by Breaking Benjamin and is the fourth single from the 2002 album Saturate
  - featured in the horror 2003 film Wrong Turn
- Wish I May (TV series), a 2016 Philippine television series
