= Ilagan (surname) =

Ilagan is a surname. Notable people with the surname include:

- Boni Ilagan (fl. from 1974), Filipino playwright, screenwriter, filmmaker, journalist and editor
- Jay Ilagan (1955–1992), Filipino actor
- Lourence Ilagan (born 1978), Filipino darts player
- RK Ilagan (born 1997), Filipino basketball player

== See also ==
- Iligan, a highly-urbanized city in Northern Mindanao, Philippines
