= The World Between Us =

The World Between Us may refer to:

- The World Between Us (Taiwanese TV series), a 2019 Taiwanese TV series
- The World Between Us (Philippine TV series), a 2021 Philippine TV series
