= Jhoana Marie Tan =

Filipino actress

Jhoanna Marie Tan
- Born: Jhoanna Marie Ramilo Tan; October 9, 1993 (age 32); Caloocan, Philippines
- Other names: Jhoana, Joan
- Occupations: Actress, Politician
- Years active: 2001–present
- Agents: GMA Artist Center (2005–2009; 2010–2021); Star Magic (2001; 2009)
- Known for: Young Eunice, Selyang, Veronika Madrigal, Carla Monteclaro, Lupe Delpado-Bustamante, Sheila Meneses, Nurse April
- Children: 1

Jhoana Marie R. Tan

SK Chairman of Brgy. Baesa-160, Caloocan
- Incumbent
- Assumed office November 2010

Personal details
- Born: October 9, 1993 (age 32)
- Profession: Actress, Politician

Jhoanna Marie Ramilo Tan (born October 9, 1993) is a Filipino actress and politician. She is known for portraying the role of young Eunice in GMA Network's remake of the 2003 Korean drama Stairway to Heaven. Recently in 2018, after a short hiatus due to her pregnancy, she joined the cast of GMA's drama-thriller series The Cure, where she plays the role of April, a nurse who gets infected by a presumed-safe, rapidly-mutating anti-cancer drug from a bite.

== Career ==
=== 2003–2016 ===
Tan started her career as young Janeth on the film Mano Po in home in 2003. She appeared in a few supporting roles in ABS-CBN before signing a contract with GMA Network. Since then, she has been given many projects, including her breakout television drama, Stairway to Heaven, along with Nita Negrita, Alakdana, Strawberry Lane, Wish I May, The Millionaire's Wife and Magkaibang Mundo, among other programming. She was given the title of "primera kontrabida" for her role in Anna Karenina in 2013 as Carla Monteclaro. She was also cast in 2014 TV series Strawberry Lane as Guadalupe Delapdo-Bustamante. She was then given roles in the latter three aforementioned series before going on-leave for her pregnancy. She was best known for antagonist roles in drama.

=== 2018–present ===
In 2018, she is cast in the primetime drama-thriller series, The Cure where she is portraying the role of a nurse who gets infected with a contagious and highly unstable, anti-cancer drug from a recent bite that gives its victims "zombie-like" characteristics, eventually starting an epidemic across the country in the process, as well as My Special Tatay as Britney, In 2019, she is cast in the afternoon drama Magkaagaw as Shiela Herrera. She was then given a role in Ang Dalawang Ikaw as Lani Delgado.

== Personal life ==
Jhoana Marie Tan was born and raised in Caloocan. In 2017, she gave birth to her first daughter. She is currently signed under contract in GMA Network, though in 2009 she was given supporting roles in ABS-CBN before finally staying with GMA. In 2010, she ran for the position of SK Chairman of Baesa-160, Caloocan in the 2010 Philippine barangay and Sangguniang Kabataan elections.

== Filmography ==
=== Film ===
Year	Title	Role
2000	Sugo ng Tondo	Lisa
2003	Mano Po 2: My Home	Little Janet
2008	Magkaibigan	Mavic
2012	Just One Summer	Samantha

=== Television ===
Year	Title	Role
2001	Recuerdo de Amor	Sheryl Villafuerte
2005	A.S.T.I.G. (All Set To Intimate God)	Herself/host
2005	Ang Mahiwagang Baul: Ang Alamat ng Nuno sa Punso	Isay
2006	O-Ha!	Various
2007	Princess Charming	Charming's co-worker
2009	Stairway to Heaven	Young Eunice Aragon
2009	Katorse	Doray
2009	Maalaala Mo Kaya: Pansit	
2010	The Last Prince	Teenager Bambi
2010	First Time	Sarah Santiago
2010	Sine Novela: Basahang Ginto	Deedee
2010	Bantatay	Anne Rosales
2011	Nita Negrita	Selyang
2011	Reel Love Presents: Tween Hearts	Tracy Santiago
2011	Alakdana	Veronica Madrigal
2012	One True Love	Aireen
2012	Magpakailanman: The Lucy Aroma Story	Young Lucy Aroma
2012–2013	Paroa: Ang Kuwento ni Mariposa	Lila
2013	Anna Karenina	Carla Monteclaro Barretto
2013	One Day, Isang Araw	Witch Girl
2014	Strawberry Lane	Guadalupe "Lupe" Delgado-Bustamante
2015	Maynila: YOLO si LOLA	Trixie
2015	Maynila: Finding Faith	
2015	My Mother's Secret	Karen Pastor
2016	Magpakailanman: Anak, Saan Kami Nagkamali?	Shirlyn
2016	Wish I May	Miley
2016	The Millionaire's Wife	Sheila Meneses
2016	Magkaibang Mundo	Bito
2017	Love is...	Jennifer
2018	Imbestigador: Lady Cop	PO1 Mae Sasing
2018	The Cure	April Sison
2018–2019	My Special Tatay	Britney
2019	Imbestigador: Sanglaan	Lindsay Valdez
2019	Dahil sa Pag-ibig	Cindy Angeles
2019	Magkaagaw	Sheila Herrera
2020	I Can See You	Tere
2021	Ang Dalawang Ikaw	Lani Delgado
2022	First Lady	Maila
2023	Magandang Dilag	Thelma Sanchez
