= One True Love (TV series) =

2012 Philippine television drama series

- Title card
- Genre: Romantic drama
- Created by: Suzette Doctolero
- Written by: Suzette Doctolero; Angeli delos Reyes; Jason Lim; Jessie Villabrille
- Directed by: Andoy Ranay
- Creative director: Jun Lana
- Starring: Alden Richards; Louise delos Reyes
- Theme music composer: Ogie Alcasid
- Opening theme: "Pangarap Ko ang Ibigin Ka" by La Diva
- Country of origin: Philippines
- Original language: Tagalog
- No. of episodes: 85 (list of episodes)

Production
- Executive producer: Nieva M. Sabit
- Production locations: Batangas, Philippines; Manila, Philippines
- Cinematography: Juan Lorenzo Orendain III
- Camera setup: Multiple-camera setup
- Running time: 19–32 minutes
- Production company: GMA Entertainment TV

Original release
- Network: GMA Network
- Release: June 11 – October 5, 2012

One True Love is a 2012 Philippine television drama romance series broadcast by GMA Network. Directed by Andoy Ranay, it stars Alden Richards and Louise delos Reyes. It premiered on June 11, 2012, on the network's Telebabad line up. The series concluded on October 5, 2012, with a total of 85 episodes.

The series is streaming online on YouTube.

== Cast and characters ==
Cast

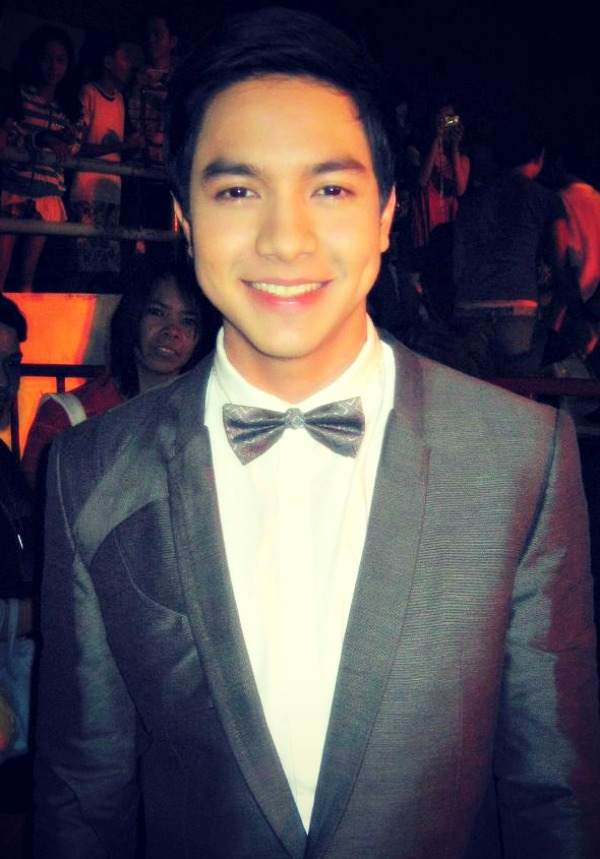
Alden Richards

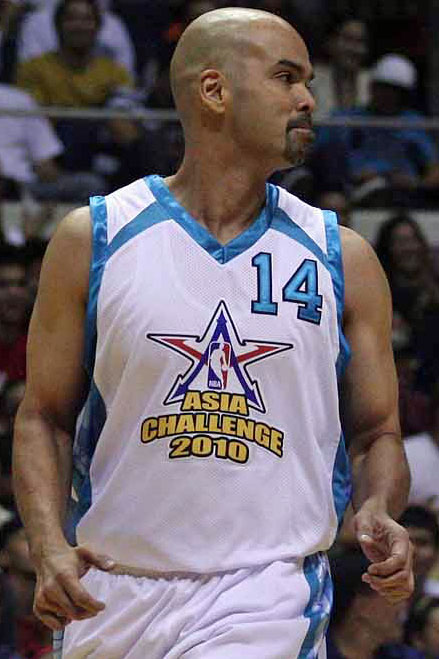
Benjie Paras

Lead cast

- Louise delos Reyes as Elize Samonte
- Alden Richards as Tisoy Bulaong

Supporting cast

- Jean Garcia as Ellen Balute-Sandoval
- Raymond Bagatsing as Carlos Samonte
- Agot Isidro as Leila Samonte
- Bembol Roco as Henry Sandoval
- Caridad Sanchez as Matilda Bulaong
- Carlene Aguilar as Candice Buenafe
- Benjie Paras as Douglas
- Tiya Pusit as Brittany
- Frencheska Farr as Violy Balute
- Wynwyn Marquez as Marla
- Lucho Ayala as Troy Sandoval

Guest cast

- Odette Khan as Sioneng Balute
- Ana Capri as Dyna
- Edelweiss Tuzons as younger Elize
- Nathaniel Britt as younger Tisoy
- Rita Iringan as Mavic
- Ana Abad Santos as Vivi
- Paolo O'Hara as Teban
- Mayton Eugenio as Iza
- Jhoana Marie Tan as Aireen
- Ping Medina as Jun Manabat
- Nomer Limatog Jr. as Zeus Pajarillo
- Annicka Dolonius as Carla Cabrera
- Robin Da Roza as Johnny

== Production ==
On May 18, 2012, the series was formally announced through a promo from GMA Network, with the title "Pushing Drama Beyond Limits", featuring the three new primetime shows of the network for the second quarter of the year 2012, which were One True Love, Luna Blanca and Makapiling Kang Muli. The full trailer of the series was launched on June 8, 2012.

Early principal photography commenced on May 29, 2012, with Suzette Doctolero working as the creator, and lead writer, executive producer Nieva Sabit, creative director Jun Lana, director Andoy Ranay and Lilybeth G. Rasonable headed as the overall in-charge of the production. The series filmed in part in Lipa, Batangas and Manila. It is set in a fictional docks and port terminal, where the shipping company of Carlos Samonte. On July 24, 2012, Alden Richards announced that the series was extended to seven weeks. It was originally slated to air for eight weeks.

=== Casting ===
Late April 2012, GMA Network announced that they will give Alden Richards and Louise delos Reyes their own drama series, as the network pushes the love team into full stardom. The Alden-Louise tandem started gaining popularity and huge fan base after their first ever project together, the drama-fantasy series, Alakdana, which was a hit. It followed by several hit series, such as, the popular teeny-bop series Tween Hearts and its movie version Tween Academy: Class of 2012, and the recently concluded primetime series My Beloved, a Dingdong Dantes-Marian Rivera starrer, which they played supporting characters. In one of his interviews, Richards said that he is overwhelmed with the network's support for the love team.

In one of her interviews, the actress stated that her decision to switched network rooted on her cravings to work in a different environment, work with some old folks again, and try something new and more challenging roles.

The production people also cast versatile actors, Jean Garcia and Raymond Bagatsing, both of them had recently completed Alice Bungisngis and Her Wonder Walis and The Good Daughter. Prior to this series, Garcia and Bagatsing paired in the so-called "dancerye" Time of My Life in 2011. In an interview, Garcia said that she is grateful in doing both damsel-in-distress and anti-hero roles for she is able to show her versatility as an actress.

=== Themes ===
One True Love consists of various themes, such as love, family, friendships, rivalries, betrayal, and vengeance and explores the reasons behind them. The creator and head writer, Suzette Doctolero explained that the series is a fresh and absorbing drama, more on about enduring power of love between two people from two different walks of life.

== Ratings ==
According to AGB Nielsen Philippines' Mega Manila household television ratings, the pilot episode of One True Love earned a 24.6% rating. The final episode scored a 28.2% rating. The series had its highest rating on October 4, 2012, with a 28.9% rating.

== Accolades ==
Accolades received by One True Love
Year	Award	Category	Recipient	Result	Ref.
2013	10th Golden Screen TV Awards	Outstanding Original Drama Series	One True Love	Nominated	
2013	10th Golden Screen TV Awards	Outstanding Performance by an Actor in a Drama Series	Alden Richards	Nominated	
2013	10th Golden Screen TV Awards	Outstanding Supporting Actor	Raymond Bagatsing	Nominated	
2013	10th Golden Screen TV Awards	Outstanding Supporting Actress	Ana Capri Jean Garcia	Nominated	
