= List of Alden Richards concerts =

Alden Richards live performances
- Concert tours: 12
- Music festivals: 3
- Promotional concerts: 14
- Charity concerts: 17
- Guest appearance: 12

Filipino singer Alden Richards has performed twelve major concert tours worldwide, two digital concerts, three music festivals and seventeen charity concerts. He has also performed several international concerts with other Kapuso artists.

== Live and virtual performances ==
=== Solo major concerts ===
Year	Title	Venue
March 18, 2016	Alden Richards Live: Aldenvasion	Ynarez Center Antipolo
May 27, 2017	Alden Richards: Upsurge	New Frontier Theatre
September 21, 2018	Alden Richards: Adrenaline Rush	New Frontier Theatre

=== Digital concerts ===
Year	Title	Venue
December 8, 2020	Alden's Reality: The Virtual Reality Concert	Digitally Distributed

=== Documentary concerts ===
Year	Title	Venue
January 30, 2022	ForwARd: Meet Richard R. Faulkerson Jr.	Distributed Digitally
September 3, 2022	ForwARd: Meet Richard R. Faulkerson Jr.	San Mateo, California
September 4, 2022	ForwARd: Meet Richard R. Faulkerson Jr.	San Diego, California
September 10, 2022	ForwARd: Meet Richard R. Faulkerson Jr.	Chicago, Illinois

== Tours ==
=== Headliner ===
Title	Year	Venue	Dates	Number of shows
Alden Richards: Live in Dubai	2016	Dubai Duty Free Tennis Stadium, Dubai, UAE	January 7, 2016	1
Concert details Alden Richards: Live in Dubai was Richards debut, sold-out solo concert in Dubai featuring songs from his second album and his hit song Wish I May. The concert also featured comedian Boobsee and Ian Red as special guest.
Alden Richards: Live in Doha	2016	Qatar National Convention Center Gharafat al Rayyan, Doha, Qatar	January 8, 2016	1
Concert details Alden Richards: Live in Doha was his sold-out concert in Doha featuring his songs from his second album with comedian Boobsie and Ian Red as special guest.
Alden Richards: Live Aldenvasion	2016	Ynarez Center Antipolo, Philippines	March 18, 2016	1
Concert details Alden Richards Live: Aldenvasion was Richards first, sold-out concert in Philippines on March 18, 2016. The concert featured his fellow Kapuso Stars Andrea Torres, Mike Tan and comedians Boobsie, Ate Reg and Kim Idol with Soul Tribe Band and Boys on the Dancefloor dancers.
One Fine Bae in Singapore	2016	Kallang Theater, Singapore	July 24, 2016	1
Concert details One Fine Day with Bae was Richards first solo concert in Singapore which featured Rock and Soul Dive singer Aicelle Santos and comedian Kim Idol.
One Fine Bae in Hongkong	2016	Southorn Indoor Stadium Wanchai, Hong Kong	December 8, 2016	1
Concert details One Fine Day with Bae was his sold out concert in HongKong featuring actress Glaiza de Castro and comedian Kim Idol.
Alden Richards: Upsurge	2017	Khia Theater, Quezon City Philippines	March 27, 2017	1
Concert details Alden Richards: Upsurge was his sold-out concert which featured Rodjun Cruz, Mark Herras, Kristoffer Martin and fellow Kapuso artists with Maine Mendoza as special guest. This was a benefit concert and proceeds were donated to GMA Kapuso Foundation to help children victims of Typhoons and to re-build the bridge in Camarines Sur.
Alden Richards: Live in Sydney	2018	Evan Theatre Panthers Penrith, Sydney, Australia	January 20, 2018	1
Concert details Alden Richards Live in Sydney was Richards first major concert sold-out concert in Australia which featured comedian Betong Sumaya with singer Johanna Aguila and Calvin Orosa.
Alden Richards: Adrenaline Rush	2018	Khia Theater, Quezon City Philippines	September 21, 2018	1
Concert details Alden Richards: Adrenaline Rush was his sold-out concert which featured special guests Regine Velasquez-Alcasid, Ai-Ai Delas Alas, Rodjun Cruz, comedian Betong Sumaya, One Up and Ex Battalion. This concert showcased his songs from second and third albums with indoor stunts. This was also a benefit concert with proceeds donated to GMA Kapuso Foundation to rebuild schools in Marawi City.
ForwARd: Alden Richards	2022	Digitally distributed San Mateo California, USA; Valley Center California, USA; Chicago, USA	January 20, 2022; September 3, 2022; September 4, 2022; September 10, 2022	4
Concert details ForwARd: Meet Richard R. Faulkerson Jr. is an international concert series held in USA with Kapamilya actress Sue Ramirez as special guest with Shining Divas: Riasa, Jen and Rane and The Amazing Trio: Audrey, Kayla and Tina feat. Fr. Sunny Castillo. These concerts were also documentary concerts. The concerts proceeds went to his own charity the AR Foundation to finance the college studies of low-income students.

=== Co-headliner ===
Year	Title	Details	Co-headliners	Ref.
2016	At Last in London	September 14, 2016; London, England	Alden Richards, Zyrah Rose, SPOON 21, Kate Torralba	
2016	One Phenomenal Night; A back to back concert	October 28, 2016; Island Cove and Leisure Park, Cavite	Ely Buendia and Alden Richards with Ice Seguerra; 2 concerts on the same day	
2017	Kalyserye Aldub sa USA	April 9, 2017; Pasadena, California, USA	Alden Richards, Maine Mendoza, Jose Manalo, Wally Bayola, Paolo Ballesteros	
2017	Kalyserye Aldub sa USA	April 12, 2017; Brooklyn, New York, USA	Alden Richards, Maine Mendoza, Jose Manalo, Wally Bayola, Paolo Ballesteros	
2017	Cebuanna Lhuillier's: Thank you for 30 concert series	September 1, 2017; Pasay City, Philippines	Sarah Geronimo, Alden Richards with Rey Valeria, Erik Santos, Mark Bautista, G-force, The Manouevres and several Viva Talent Artists	
2017	Cebuanna Lhuillier's: Thank you for 30 concert series	September 22, 2017; Lapu-Lapu City, Cebu, Philippines	Sarah Geronimo, Alden Richards with Rey Valeria, Erik Santos, Mark Bautista, G-force, The Manouevres and several Viva Talent Artists	
2017	Cebuanna Lhuillier's: Thank you for 30 concert series	October 20, 2017; Davao City, Philippines	Sarah Geronimo, Alden Richards with Rey Valeria, Erik Santos, Mark Bautista, G-force, The Manouevres and several Viva Talent Artists	
2019	EB Dabarkads Day in Dubai	November 15, 2019; Dubai World Trade Centre, Dubai, UAE	Vico Sotto, Joey De Leon, Pauline Luna-Sotto with Alden Richards, Maine Mendoza, Jose Manalo, Wally Bayola, Paolo Ballesteros, Allan K, Ryzza Mae Dizon, Baby Baste	
2025	Sparkada Trenta: The 30th Anniversary	November 15, 2025; MOA Amphitheater, MOA Sky Pasay City, Philippines	Alden Richards, Julie Anne San Jose, Rayver Cruz, Barbie Forteza, Ai-Ai delas Alas, Michelle Dee, Jillian Ward, Bianca Umali, Angel Guardian, Miguel Tanfelix, Ysabel Ortega, Rita Daniela, Rodjun Cruz, Max Collins, Kristoffer Martin, Pinoy Big Brother Collab, Starstruck Alumni, Sparkle Artists, GMA Queendom etc.	

=== Guest appearance ===
List of music festival performances, showing dates, locations, and venues
Title	Headlining Artist (s)	Date and Venue	Performed songs	Ref.
Fearless Concert	Jonalyn Viray	February 28, 2014; Music Museum, San Juan Metro Manila	"Terrified" (a duet with Jonalyn) "Story of my life"	
Ai Am who Ai Am	Ai-Ai delas Alas	May 16, 2015; SkyDome North Edsa, Quezon City	"All of me" "Bakit ngayon ka lang" (a duet with AiAi)	
Songs from a Silver World (Classical concert)	Gerphil Flores, Rachel Gerodias and KMF Scholars	May 7, 2016; Carlos P. Rumolo Auditorium, RCBC Makati City	"All of me" "Beauty and the Beast (a duet with Gerphil)	
Reborn1: Walker Worship Concert	Regine Velasquez-Alcasid, Ogie Alcasid, Jaya and Walker1	August 3, 2016; Mall of Asia, Pasay City	"How great is our God"	
TropGoals: Party with the Baes	EB Baes with Maine Mendoza, Wally Bayola and Jose Manalo	March 24, 2017; SM Skydome, SM North Edsa Quezon City	"Tadhana" (a duet with Maine)	
Ai meets Lani (Lani meets Ai?)	Lani Misalucha and Ai-Ai delas Alas	September 17, 2017; New Frontier Theater, Quezon City	"Wish I May"	
The Kuhl 2nd Event	Kuh Ledesma	March 16, 2018; CCF Main, Tiendesetas, Pasig City	"How great is our God"	
Ai H.E.A.R.T R.C.B.	Ai-Ai delas Alas	June 24, 2019; Araneta Coliseum, Quezon City	"I will be here"	
Amazing concert: Try ko lang ha?	Betong Sumaya	November 21, 2019; Music Museum, San Juan Metro Manila	"Don't care"	
Co-Love Live	Dennis Trillo and Jennylyn Mercado	February 15, 2020; New Frontier Theater Cubao, Quezon City	"This I promise you", "I swear" "As long as you love me"	
Pinakamakinang: The Brilliant concert	Glenda Victorio	February 7, 2023; Smart Araneta, Coliseum, Quezon City	"Kailan" (a duet with Glenda)	
Will Ashley Live	Will Ashley	October 18, 2025; New Frontier Theater, Quezon City	"Next in Line"	
Jona Journey to the Arena	Jonalyn Viray	November 8, 2025; Mall of Asia, Pasay City	"Kung di rin lang Ikaw" (a duet with Jonalyn)	

== Music and cultural festivals ==
List of music festival performances, showing dates, locations, and venues
Title	Date	Venue	Notes	Ref.
Fiesta ko Texas in Houston	August 3, 2017	Bayou Event Center, Houston, Texas, USA	Alden Richards, Carla Abellana	
A Taste of Manila	August 17, 2024	Bathurst St. and Wilson Ave, North York, Toronto, Canada	Canadian Prime Minister Justin Trudeau was present at the event; Over 400,000 people attended the two days music festival.; Alden Richards, Isko Moreno and Boobay	
London Barrio Fiesta	July 5–6, 2025	Cranford Community College; Hounslow, London, England	Alden Richards, Julie Anne San Jose and Rayver Cruz	

== Promotional concerts ==
The following is a list of international concerts by Kapuso artists, sponsored by GMA Pinoy TV.

Year	Title	Details	Artists
2015	Kapusong Pinoy sa Vancouver	May 29, 2015; The Orpheum Theatre, Vancouver, Canada	Ai-ai delas Alas, Christian Bautista, Jonalyn Viray, Alden Richards, Betong Sumaya
2015	Kapusong Pinoy sa Anaheim	May 31, 2015; City National Grove of Annaheim, Saskatchewan, Canada	Ai-ai delas Alas, Christian Bautista, Jonalyn Viray, Alden Richards, Betong Sumaya
2015	Kapusong Pinoy sa New York	September 5, 2015; The Town Hall, New York City, United States	Dingdong Dantes, Alden Richards, Ai-ai delas Alas, Christian Bautista, Betong Sumaya, Julie Anne San Jose, Rita De Guzman
2015	Kapusong Pinoy sa Japan	October 11, 2015; New Pier, Hall Tokyo, Japan	Ai-ai delas Alas, Aicelle Santos, Alden Richards
2016	Kapusong Pinoy sa Dubai	March 10, 2016; Al Nasr Leisureland, Dubai; United Arab Emirates	Alden Richards, Bentong Sumaya, Aicelle Santos
2017	Sikat Ka, Kapuso!	January 22, 2017; Terrace Theatre Long Beach, California; United States	Alden Richards, Dennis Trillo, Jennylyn Mercado, Tom Rodriguez, Lovi Poe, Betong Sumaya
2018	Sikat Ka, Kapuso!	April 7, 2018; Newark Symphony Hall, New Jersey; United States	Dingdong Dantes, Dennis Trillo, Jennylyn Mercado, Lovi Poe, Alden Richards, Betong Sumaya
2018	Sikat Ka, Kapuso!	April 8, 2018; Sony Center Performing Arts, Toronto; Canada	Dingdong Dantes, Dennis Trillo, Jennylyn Mercado, Lovi Poe, Alden Richards, Betong Sumaya
2019	Kapusong Pinoy: Musikalye sa Brookyln	May 11, 2019; Kings Theatre, Brooklyn New York City; United States	Alden Richards, Christian Bautista, Golden Canedo, Kyline Alcantara, Betong Sumaya, Rayver Cruz, Julie Anne San Jose
2023	Pinoys to the World	August 25, 2023; Madinat Al Ifran; Muscat Oman	Marian Rivera, Dingdong Dantes, Alden Richards, Christian Bautista, Ai-Ai delas Alas and Lani Misalucha
2023	Pinoys to the World	August 26, 2023; Dubai World Trade Center; Dubai, United Arab of Emirates	Marian Rivera, Dingdong Dantes, Alden Richards, Christian Bautista, Ai-Ai delas Alas and Lani Misalucha
2024	Sparkle World Tour	August 9, 2024; City National Grove of Anaheim, California; United States	Alden Richards, AiAi delas Alas, Isko Moreno, Rayver Cruz, Julie Anne San Jose and Boobay
2024	Sparkle World Tour	August 10, 2024; South San Francisco High School Auditorium, San Francisco, California; United States	Alden Richards, AiAi delas Alas, Isko Moreno, Rayver Cruz, Julie Anne San Jose and Boobay
2024	Sparkle World Tour	August 11, 2024; Southview Alliance Church in Calgary, Alberta; Canada	Alden Richards, AiAi delas Alas, Isko Moreno and Boobay

== Charity concerts ==
Richards has performed as a headliner or as special guest in various benefit concerts.

Date	Title	Venue	Country
January 13–14, 2014	116TH Anniversary of Philippines Independence "The Freedom concert"	Shrine Auditorium, Los Angeles, California and Bill Graham Civic Auditorium, San Francisco, California	United States of America
Featured Artists: Ogie Alcasid, Marian Rivera, Sheryn Regis, Alden Richards with Regine Velasquez as special guest and various artists; Beneficiary: Philippine Disaster Recovery Foundation
October 24, 2015	"Tamang Panahon"	Philippine Arena Bulacan	Philippines
Featured Artists: Tito Sotto, Vic Sotto, Joey de Leon, Pauleen Luna-Sotto with Alden Richards and Maine Mendoza including Jose Manalo, Wally Bayola, Paolo Ballesteros, Ryan Agoncillo, Michael V, Ruby Rodriguez and the rest of EB cast. Over 55,000 people watched the concert.; Beneficiary: construction of ALDub libraries in different schools
November 23, 2015	For Love of Mama	Mall of Asia Pasay City	Philippines
Featured Artists: Ai-ai delas Alas with Fatima Soriano, Erik Santos, Nikki Valdez, The Philippine Madrigal Singers, Alden Richards and various artists; Beneficiary: Anawin Lay Mission Foundation, home for the elderly and construction of Kristong-Hari Parish Church
December 22, 2015	Handog Pamasko with Alden Richards	Zamboanga Coliseum	Philippines
Featured Artists: Alden Richards, Sam Pinto, Kylie Vergara, Wendy Valdez; Beneficiary: Christian Family Movement for the construction of Our Mother of Perpetual Help Parish Church
January 10, 2016	Bae in the City Laguna	Laguna Star Polytechnic University, Laguna	Philippines
Featured Artists: Alden Richards; Beneficiary: Laguna Star Polytechnic University (LSPU) scholars
February 18, 2016	A Date with Ultimate Pambansang Bae	University of Southeastern Philippines (USEP) Gymnasium, Davao City	Philippines
Featured Artists: Alden Richards, comedians Gladys Guevarra, Boobay and Boobsie; Beneficiary: Field of Dreams Children's Charity Foundation
May 7, 2016	Songs from a Silver World	Carlos P. Rumolo Auditorium, RCBC Makati City	Philippines
Featured Artists: Rachelle, Gerodias, Gerphil Flores, KMF Scholars, Alden Richards as special guest; Beneficiary: Klassikal Music Foundation Scholars
August 3, 2016	Reborn:1 Walker Worship Concert	Mall of Asia, Pasay City	Philippines
Featured Artists: Regine Velasquez-Alcasid, Ogie Alcasid, Jaya with Angeline Quinto, Sarah Geronimo, Alden Richards as special guest; Beneficiary: Anawin Lay Missions Foundation
May 7, 2017	Alden Richards: Upsurge	Kia Theatre Quezon City	Philippines
Featured Artists: Alden Richards with special guests Maine Mendoza, Jerald Napoles, Rodjun Cruz, Mark Herras and various artists; Beneficiary: GMA Kapuso Foundation for children victims of Typhoons and reconstruction of Camarines Sur bridge
September 18, 2017	10th Anniversary Gabay Guro	Mall of Asia Arena, Pasay City	Philippines
Featured Artists: Lea Salonga, Regine Velasquez -Alcasid, Ogie Alcasid, Jaya, Pops Fernandez, Gary V., Alden Richards, Maine Mendoza, Baste, Gabby Concepcion, Tom Rodriguez and Jonalyn Viray; Beneficiary: Gabay Guro Foundation
January 26, 2018	San Isidro at Bente Singko	The Grand Event Combo Palace, Marikina	Philippines
Featured Artists: Alden Richards, Julia Clarete, Charmaine Clamour, Clarissa Maiquez and Rev. Fr. Rock Berdos; Beneficiary: construction of San Isidro Church canopy
March 16, 2018	The Kuhl 2nd event	CCF Main, Tiendesetas, Pasig City	Philippines
Featured Artists: Kuh Ledesma with special guests Piolo Pascual, Ogie Alcasid, Christian Bautista, Alden Richards, Nanette Inventor, Carlo Orosa, Perkins Twins, Kuhl Ledesma daughter Isabelle etc.; Beneficiary: The Holy Bible Giver Foundation
September 21, 2018	Alden Richards: Adrenaline Rush	Kia Theatre, Quezon City	Philippines
Featured Artists: Alden Richards with special guests Regine Velasquez-Alcasid, Ai-ai delas Alas, Betong Sumaya and various artists; Beneficiary: GMA Kapuso Foundation for rebuilding schools in Marawi City, Mindanao
June 24, 2019	Ai H.E.A.R.T R.C.B.	Araneta Coliseum, Quezon City	Philippines
Featured Artists: AiAi delas Alas with guest performers: Alden Richards, Julie Anne San Jose, Erik Santos, Kyline Alcantara, Jose Manalo, Wally Bayola and various artists; Beneficiary: Kristong Hari Parish Church
April 18, 2021	Philippine Movie Press Club (PMPC): Awit ng Pandemya	Virtual concert	Philippines
Featured Artists: Kuh Ledesma, Jed Madela, Charo Laude, Alden Richards and various artists; Beneficiary: PMPC officers and members medical assistance
January 30, 2022	Forward: Meet Richard R. Faulkerson Jr.	Distributed digitally	Philippines
Featured Artists: Alden Richards, The Manila String Machine, University of Sto. Thomas Singers; Beneficiary: AR Foundation scholars
