= We Win As One =

Single by Lea Salonga
- Released: September 3, 2019
- Recorded: 2019
- Length: 4:00
- Songwriters: Floy Quintos, Ryan Cayabyab
- Producer: Equinox Manila

"We Win As One" is a song that was used as a theme song of the 2019 Southeast Asian Games in the Philippines. The song was released on September 3, 2019 along with the music video. The song makes the Filipino athletes to compete at the international sporting events to go all-out for the glory and honor of the nation. Produced by Equinox Manila and directed by Shem Hampac, the music video for "We Win As One" shows Ms. Lea Salonga singing with the New Clark City serving as background. The music video also features footage from select SEA Games athletes. The music video is also available for viewing across all SEA Games social media platforms.

== Release ==
The song was launched on July 11, 2019, during the 2nd SEA Games Chef-de-mission meeting. The theme song expresses the message of sportsmanship, athletic superiority and artistic achievements that linked all 11 participating countries from November 30 – December 11. On August 23, a teaser showing the official theme song featuring Lea Salonga was shown. On September 3, the song along with the music video was officially launched during a media launch at the Resorts World Manila. The intercut with scenes of athletes in various sports was also released a month later. On November 25, Salonga was asked by the netizens to perform at the Opening Ceremony but she wasn't able to perform. She said via tweet,

Leaving on a jet plane for Singapore tomorrow and will begin our 14-show Sweeney run on Thursday night. This means I will not be performing at the SEA Games opening ceremonies on Saturday. I won’t be back home (un)til after Sweeney is done.

But she said to the performers at the opening ceremony, "HAVE THE BEST TIME! To the athletes, may the odds be ever in your favor. You have already done your countries proud." She was in Singapore for the Sweeney Todd Musical from November 28 – December 8. During the opening ceremony of the games, performers such as Anna Fegi, apl.de.ap, Robert Seña, Iñigo Pascual, TNT Boys, KZ Tandingan, Aicelle Santos, Lani Misalucha, Jed Madela, Christian Bautista, and Elmo Magalona led the singing of the theme song during the finale.

== We Heal as One ==
On March 26, 2020, the song was rewritten and rearranged into "We Heal as One" in response to the 2020 coronavirus pandemic in the Philippines, with the verses being sung in Tagalog. The music video was first aired during 24 Oras through GMA Network. Ryan Cayabyab also composed the song with new lyrics by Floy Quintos.

The song was performed by several Filipino singers including Iñigo Pascual, Jed Madela, Jamie Rivera, KZ Tandingan, Ogie Alcasid, Martin Nievera, Sarah Geronimo, Bamboo, Gary Valenciano, Apl.de.ap, Alden Richards, Lea Salonga, Julie Anne San Jose, Pops Fernandez, Mark Bautista, Rita Daniela, Paolo Valenciano, Aicelle Santos, Christian Bautista, Lani Misalucha, Ken Chan , Isay Alvarez, Menchu Lauchengco, Michael Williams, and Robert Seña.
