= Boni Ilagan =

Filipino playwright, screenwriter, filmmaker, journalist, and editor

Bonifacio Parabuac Ilagan, often known just as Boni Ilagan, is a Filipino playwright, screenwriter, filmmaker, journalist, and editor best known for numerous socially-conscious, critically-acclaimed works in theater, film and television, most notably the films The Flor Contemplacion Story (1995), Dukot (Desaparecidos, 2009), Sigwa (Rage, 2010), and Deadline (The Reign of Impunity, 2011); as well as his first play, Pagsambang Bayan (1976), which portrayed the human rights violations of the Marcoses. He is also one of the prominent torture victims who survived the Marcos dictatorship.

On December 4, 2024, Ilagan and 74 others filed the second impeachment complaint against Vice President Sara Duterte, citing betrayal of public trust for her office's alleged misuse of confidential funds.

== Biography ==
Ilagan is co-convenor of the Campaign Against the Return of the Marcoses and Martial Law and was vice chair of the organization Samahan ng Ex-Detainees Laban sa Detensyon at Aresto (SELDA) in 2017 when it was working to get compensation for the martial law human rights violations victims. As the founding director of the activist theater organization Panday Sining, he is acknowledged to have had a significant impact on the development of protest street theater in the Philippines.

He is the elder brother of disappeared anti-martial law activist Rizalina Ilagan, one of the Southern Tagalog 10 activists who were abducted in late July 1977 at the Makati Medical Center in Makati, Metro Manila, and never seen again.

Major award giving bodies that have recognized Ilagan's work over the years include the Catholic Mass Media Awards, the Cultural Center of the Philippines Centennial Honors for the Arts, the Don Carlos Palanca Memorial Awards for Literature, the Filipino Academy of Movie Arts and Sciences awards, the Film Academy of the Philippines' Luna Award, the Gawad Balagtas, the Gawad Plaridel, the Palihang Aurelio V. Tolentino, and the Philippine Movie Press Club Star Awards for Television.

== Imprisonment and torture ==
As an activist during the Marcos dictatorship, Ilagan was caught and imprisoned by forces loyal to Ferdinand Marcos in 1974, alongside Journalist Pete Lacaba. He was brought to Camp Crame and tortured. He was eventually conditionally released in 1976, after which he resumed his studies at the University of the Philippines.

== Pagsambang Bayan ==
Ilagan wrote the play Pagsambang Bayan and dedicated it to his sister Rizalina and other members of the Southern Tagalog 10. It was first staged in September 1977 by director Behn Cervantes and the University of the Philippines Repertory Company. The United Church of Christ in the Philippines sponsored the production. The play's structure revolved around a Christian liturgical Mass. The staging of the play led to the arrest of Cervantes and the play's musical director Susan Tagle.

According to Bulatlat, Pagsambang Bayan "was the first play during martial law that challenged the military regime in a way that no theater piece had dared to do then."

The play has been restaged multiple times around the Philippines. A musical adaptation of the play directed by Joel Lamangan was staged in 2017 at the Polytechnic University of the Philippines and the Cultural Center of the Philippines.

== In popular media ==
He was portrayed by Alden Richards in the GMA Television Network's commemorative documentary Alaala: A Martial Law Special, marking the 45th anniversary of Ferdinand Marcos' declaration of martial law. Alaala won the Gold Camera Award in the docudrama category of the 2018 U.S. International Film and Video Festival.

== See also ==
- Rizalina Ilagan
- Pete Lacaba
- Martial law under Ferdinand Marcos
- Alaala: A Martial Law Special
