= Bet ng Bayan =

2014 Philippine television reality show

- Title card
- Genre: Reality competition
- Presented by: Regine Velasquez; Alden Richards
- Country of origin: Philippines
- Original language: Tagalog
- No. of episodes: 13

Production
- Camera setup: Multiple-camera setup
- Running time: 30 minutes
- Production company: GMA Entertainment TV

Original release
- Network: GMA Network
- Release: October 5 – December 28, 2014

Bet ng Bayan (transl. bet of the town) is a 2014 Philippine television reality competition show broadcast by GMA Network. Hosted by Regine Velasquez and Alden Richards, it premiered on October 5, 2014. The show concluded on December 28, 2014, with a total of 13 episodes.

Hosts

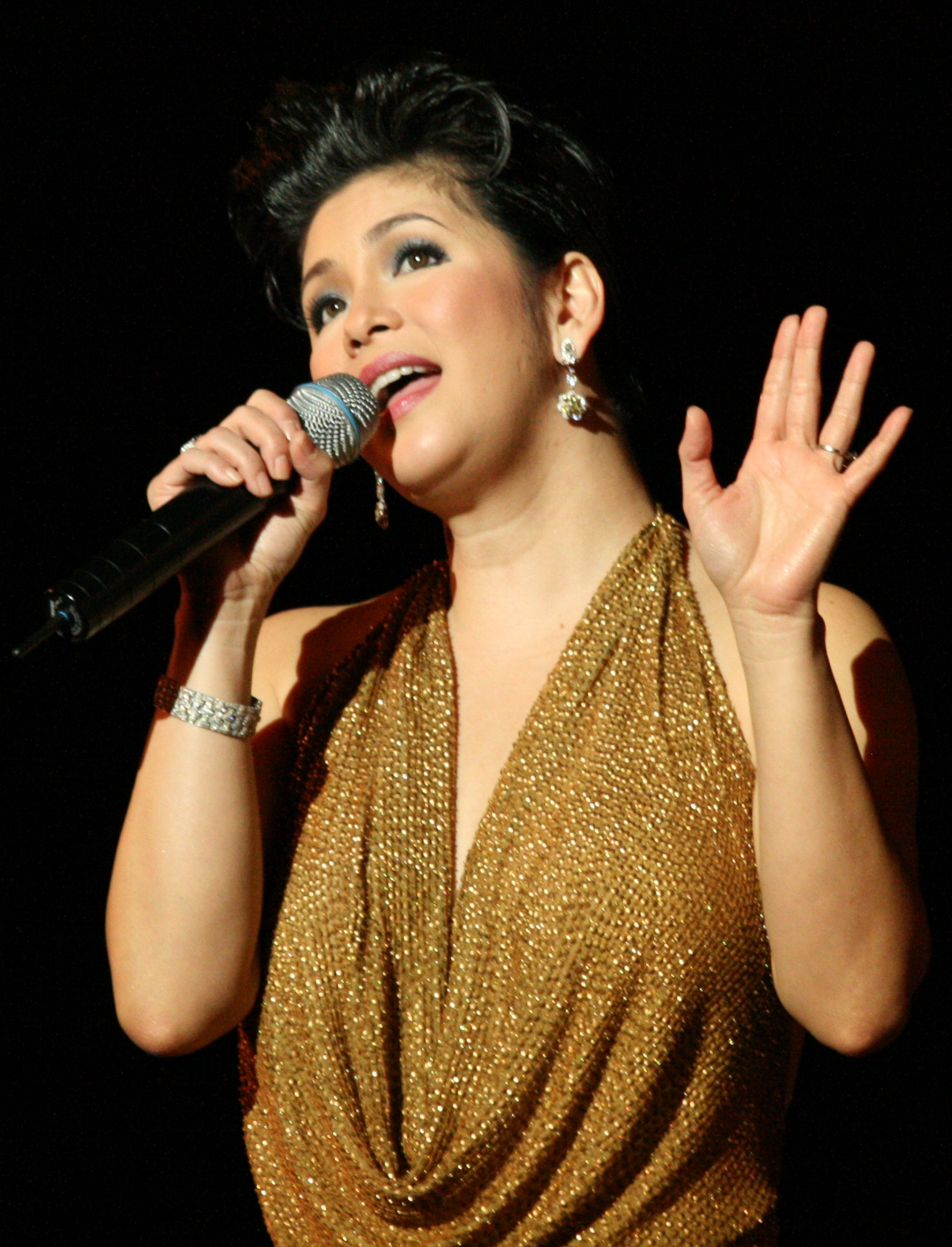
Regine Velasquez

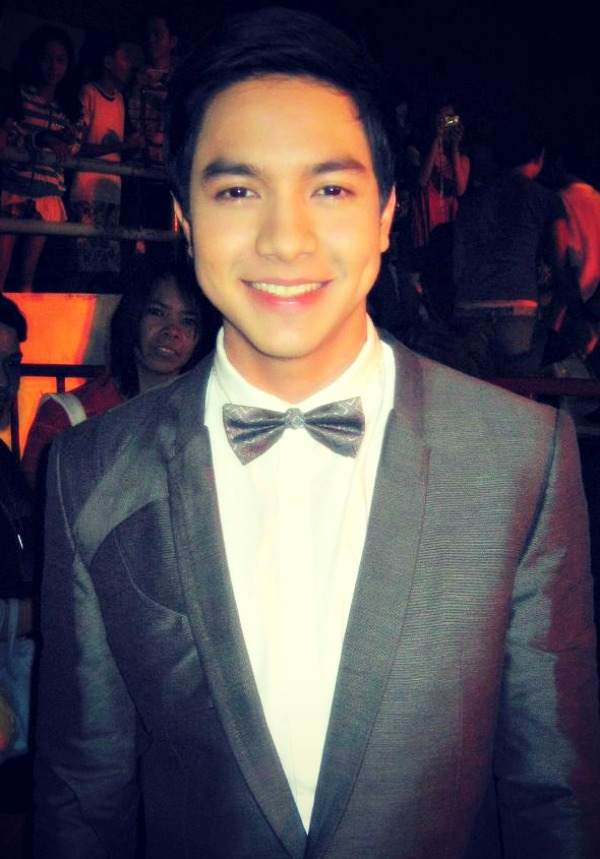
Alden Richards

== Contestants ==
Singing

- Luzon: Renz Robosa and Katherine Castillo
- Mega Manila: Veronica Atienza and Apple Delleva
- Visayas: Alma Sumagaysay and Hannah Precillas
- Mindanao: Sherwin Baguion and Keirulf Raboy

Dancing

- Luzon: Boyz Unlimited and UNEP Dance Club
- Mega Manila: Names Going Wild and A's Crew
- Visayas: Capa-DS and Don Juan
- Mindanao: Black Sheep and D'Gemini

Unique talent

- Luzon: Jason Ivan Sobremonte and John Kim Belangel
- Mega Manila: Techno Jazz and Ian Adriano
- Visayas: Master of Pain and Karinyoso Boys
- Mindanao: John Carlo Moneral and Jomar Abjelina

== Elimination chart ==
Singing
| Contestant | Semifinal / finals | | | | |
| Contestant | 1 | 2 | 3 | 4 | 5 |
|---|---|---|---|---|---|
| Hannah Precillas | | Won | | | Winner |
| Kierulf Raboy | | | Won | | Finalist |
| Renz Robosa | Won | | | | Finalist |
| Veronica Atienza | | | | Won | Finalist |
| Apple Delleva | | | | Eliminated | |
| Sherwin Baguion | | | Eliminated | | |
| Alma Sumagaysay | | Eliminated | | | |
| Katherine Castillo | Eliminated | | | | |

Dancing
| Contestant | Semifinal / finals | | | | |
| Contestant | 1 | 2 | 3 | 4 | 5 |
|---|---|---|---|---|---|
| Don Juan | | Won | | | Winner |
| A's Crew | | | | Won | Finalist |
| D'Gemini | | | Won | | Finalist |
| UNEP Dance Club | Won | | | | Finalist |
| Names Going Wild | | | | Eliminated | |
| Black Sheep | | | Eliminated | | |
| Capa-DS | | Eliminated | | | |
| Boyz Unlimited | Eliminated | | | | |

Unique talent
| Contestant | Semifinal / finals | | | | |
| Contestant | 1 | 2 | 3 | 4 | 5 |
|---|---|---|---|---|---|
| Jason Sobremonte | Won | | | | Winner |
| Jomar Abjelina | | | Won | | Finalist |
| Master of Pain | | Won | | | Finalist |
| Techno Jazz | | | | Won | Finalist |
| Ian Adriano | | | | Eliminated | |
| John Carlo Moneral | | | Eliminated | | |
| Karinyoso Boys | | Eliminated | | | |
| John Kim Belangel | Eliminated | | | | |

== Ratings ==
According to AGB Nielsen Philippines' Mega Manila household television ratings, the pilot episode of Bet ng Bayan earned a 14.7% rating. The final episode scored a 14.3% rating.

== Accolades ==
Accolades received by Bet ng Bayan
| Year | Award | Category | Recipient | Result | Ref. |
|---|---|---|---|---|---|
| 2015 | 29th PMPC Star Awards for Television | Best Talent Search Program | Bet ng Bayan | Nominated | |
| 2015 | 29th PMPC Star Awards for Television | Best Talent Show Program Host | Regine Velasquez Alden Richards | Nominated | |
