= Alaala: A Martial Law Special =

2017 Filipino docudrama film about martial law

- Directed by: Adolfo Alix Jr.; Rember Gelera
- Written by: Bonifacio "Boni" Ilagan
- Screenplay by: Bonifacio "Boni" Ilagan
- Starring: Alden Richards; Bianca Umali; Rocco Nacino
- Music by: Ann Margaret Figueroa
- Production companies: GMA News (now GMA Integrated News); GMA Public Affairs
- Distributed by: GMA Network
- Release date: 17 September 2017 (Philippines)
- Running time: 68 minutes
- Country: Philippines
- Language: Tagalog

Alaala: A Martial Law Special is a 2017 Filipino documentary drama directed by Adolfo Alix Jr. and Rember Gelera. It stars Alden Richards as the lead role. The film is produced by GMA News (now GMA Integrated News) and GMA Public Affairs, in celebration of the 45th anniversary since former president Ferdinand Marcos's declaration of martial law in 1973.

The film was released on September 17, 2017 on GMA Network's Sunday Night Box Office.

== Synopsis ==
Boni Ilagan, a human rights activist leads citizens rally against President Marcos's martial law regime, where Ilagan and several human rights activists are illegally imprisoned, tortured and suffered all types of abuse in the hands of the Philippines constabulary force.

== Cast ==
- Alden Richards as Boni Ilagan
- Rocco Nacino as Pete Lacaba
- Gina Alajar as Sara Ilagan
- Bianca Umali as Rizalina Ilagan
- Cedrick Juan as Abe
- Mailes Kanapi as Sanse

== Accolades ==
Accolades received by Alaala: A Martial Law Special
Year	Award	Category	Recipient	Result	Ref.
2017	31st PMPC Star Awards for Television	Best Documentary	Alaala: A Martial Law Special	Nominated	
2018	50th US International Film & Video Festival	Gold Camera Award	Alaala: A Martial Law Special	Won	
2018	New York TV and Film Festival Awards	Silver Medal Award	Alaala: A Martial Law Special	Won	
2019	FDCP 3rd Film Ambassador's Night	TV Documentary	Alaala: A Martial Law Special	Honored	
