= Alden Richards (EP) =

EP by Alden Richards
- Released: May 26, 2013
- Recorded: February–April 2013
- Genre: Pop
- Length: 24:22
- Language: English, Tagalog
- Label: Universal Records
- Producer: Ito Rapadas

Alden Richards chronology
Alden Richards (2013)	Wish I May (2015)

Singles from Alden Richards
- 1. "Haplos" Released: April 5, 2013; 2. "Naaalala Ka" Released: September 11, 2015

Alden Richards is the EP of Filipino actor and singer Alden Richards under Universal Records released on May 26, 2013, in the Philippines in CD and digital formats. The album magazine includes Richards' biography and personal interests in music, showbiz, food and other stuff. However, the physical released was first launched at TriNoma mall in which he has accompanied the event with live performance, autograph signing and giving posters and on May 31 for the nationwide distribution.

== Background ==
Alden Richards embarked on a new journey as a recording artist under Universal Records, joining the elite roster of Filipino artists, like Gary Valenciano, Ogie Alcasid, Regine Velasquez, Christian Bautista, and Jaya, among others. During the contract signing with the label, he was accompanied by David Fabros and Simoun Ferrer of GMA Artist Center and Universal Records' general manager, Kathleen Dy-Go and operations manager, Peter Chan. During the contract signing conference, Richards said that the album itself will include his favorite songs.

Universal Records Management had given Jerwin a list of songs, then Ito Rapadas, the album producer, selected most of the tracks. The lead single ("Haplos") was the first song performed by Jerwin. When the first demo was heard by the management, they were impressed by the outcome. Their common feedback was that Jerwin really had good musical skills. Though Jerwin experienced some difficulty in recording sessions with regard to his busy schedule, he still found enjoyment in every single moment of it.

In his exclusive interview in the music magazine Pinoy (April – May issue), he confirmed that he recorded five remakes and one original composition by Vince Rod Katindoy, member and composer of Shamrock. The final track listing consisted of seven tracks including his covers of "Naaalala Ka" by Rey Valera, "Di Na Mababawi" by Spongecola and Itchyworms' "Akin Ka Na Lang" and his carrier single, Shamrock's "Haplos". He expressed that the album doesn't include "belting songs," but consists of ballads that are cool and relaxing to hear, and that he hopes for his album to reach gold status and not have any negative feedback.

In October 2015, Universal Records released a special edition of the album which includes AlDub theme song "God Gave Me You" by Bryan White. The song was frequently dubbed by Alden Richards in Eat Bulaga!'s Kalyeserye. Richards' version of the song is included in his 2015 album Wish I May.

== Critical reception ==
The self-titled album was launched on May 26, 2013, at the Trinoma Activity Center and Alden was overwhelmed by the reception of his fans. "Hindi ko po inexpect na ganoon yung magiging reception kasi hindi ko po ineexpect na matatanggap ako ng tao as a singer," (I don't expect that kind of reception because I don't expect that people would accept me as a singer,) he added in a press conference held on June 11. In 2015, Richards gained so much popularity courtesy of ALDUB love team played in Eat Bulagas's segment, Juan For All, All For Juan. In line with this, the album eventually topped the charts of iTunes Philippines, and among largest retailers in the country such as Astroplus, and Odyssey. It also landed on Billboard World Albums Chart at number 10 for the week of October 17, 2015.

== Re-package ==
The album was re-release after two years since its debut in market in 2013, on November 28, 2015. It features Bryan Whites's hit, God Gave Me You, and with additional instrumentals for each tracks from the album.

== Singles ==
"Haplos", written and originally performed by Shamrock, was released as the lead single from the album on April 5, 2013, and became available on the April 9 in digital format. It was launched at the noontime musical variety show, Party Pilipinas by Richards himself performing on April 14. Further, the song topped all digital singles chart including My Music Store Philippines and the Philippines franchise of iTunes on April 19. Extending that the single itself was used as one of the official sound track for GMA's 2013 primetime series, Mundo Mo'y Akin, where he played the character role of Jerome. Its music video was directed and edited by J. Pacena II and first premiered in Myx Philippines, on May 23.

== Track listing ==
No.	Title	Writer(s)	Producer(s)	Length
1.	"Haplos"	Vince Rod Katindoy	Ito Rapadas	3:34
2.	"Naaalala Ka"	Rey Valera	Rapadas	3:49
3.	"Can't Find No Reason"	Dodjie Simon	Rapadas	2:56
4.	"‘Di Na Mababawi"	Rey Dilay	Rapadas	3:15
5.	"Sa Aking Tabi"	Vince Rod Katindoy	Rapadas	3:48
6.	"Akin Ka Nalang"	Johanne Angelo Nicolas	Rapadas	3:05
7.	"Everytime I See You"	P.O. Sorensen, R. Kristoffersen, M. Sjoberg	Rapadas	3:52
Total length:				24:22

== Personnel ==
- Kathleen Dy-Go – executive producer
- Ito Rapadas – producer
- Bobby Velasco, Alkemi Production, Fred Garcia, Ito Rapadas – song arrangers
- Gigi Arcay – guitarist
- Rommel Elliseo, Ito Rapadas – back-up vocalists
- Willy Villa at U.R. Recording Studio – song mixer and master
- Willy Villa and Gil Losenada at U.R. Recording Studio – record producers
- Doc Marion Pecjo – photographer
- Rex Atienza – stylist
- Denise Go – hair and makeup artist
- Anne Kate Pinero –album designer

== Charts ==
Weekly chart performance for Alden Richards (EP)
Chart (2015)	Peak position
US World Albums (Billboard)	10

== Certifications ==
Region	Certification	Certified units/sales
Philippines (PARI)	Platinum	15,000

== Release history ==
Country	Edition	Release date	Label	Catalogue
Philippines	Standard (download), CD	May 26, 2013	Universal Records Inc.	800594–490142
Philippines	Special Edition CD	November 28, 2015	Universal Records Inc.	800594–490142
