= Alden Richards =

Filipino actor (born 1992)

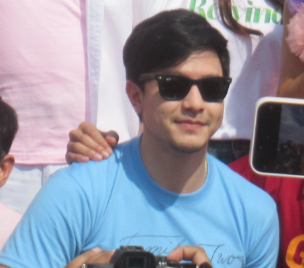
- Richards at the 2023 Metro Manila Film Festival
- Born: Richard Reyes Faulkerson Jr. January 2, 1992 (age 34); Quezon City, Philippines
- Education: Paco Catholic School; Colegio de Santa Rosa de Lima; De La Salle Canlubang; Alpha Aviation Group
- Occupations: Actor; model; television host; singer; businessman
- Years active: 2009–present
- Agent: Sparkle GMA Artist Center (since 2013)
- Works: Filmography; discography; concerts
- Musical career
- Genres: Pop; OPM
- Instrument: Vocal
- Years active: 2013–present
- Labels: Universal; GMA

Richard Reyes Faulkerson Jr. (born January 2, 1992), known professionally as Alden Richards, is a Filipino actor, model, television host, singer, and businessman. Known for his leading roles in romantic comedies, historical dramas, and fantasy-action television series and films, his accolades include five PMPC Star Awards for Movies, six PMPC Star Awards for Television, eight Box Office Entertainment Awards, two FAMAS Awards, a Seoul International Drama Award, a Jinseo Arigato International Film Festival Award, a Golden Screen Award, and an Ani ng Dangal, in addition to nominations for a Gawad Urian and two Metro Manila Film Festival. Richards is referred to in the entertainment industry as "Asia's Multimedia Star".

Richards's acting career began in the fantasy series Alakdana (2011), which marked his first screen appearance. His breakthrough was in the romantic drama One True Love (2012). He rose to stardom in the romantic comedy sketch Kalyeserye opposite Maine Mendoza, known popularly as AlDub. He later starred in various television series including Mundo Mo'y Akin (2013), Carmela (2014), Illustrado (2014), Destined to be Yours (2017), Victor Magtanggol (2018), The Gift (2019–2020), The World Between Us (2021–2022), Start-Up PH (2022), Pulang Araw (2024), Love, Siargao (2026) and Code Grey (2026).

In films, Richards started in supporting roles and transitioned into leading ones. His commercially successful movies include Ang Panday 2 (2011), Si Agimat, si Enteng Kabisote at si Ako (2012), My Bebe Love: KiligPaMore (2015), Imagine You and Me (2016), Five Breakups and a Romance (2023), including Hello, Love, Goodbye (2019) and Hello, Love, Again (2024), which are among the highest-grossing Filipino films of all time. Richards made his directorial debut in the legal thriller film Out of Order (2025).

Richards has received several awards and nominations for his music albums. His sophomore EP Wish I May is certified diamond record by PARI, making it one of the best-selling albums in the Philippines. He has ventured into production, directing and co-producing films, concerts and E-sports events.

Beyond his work in the entertainment industry, he has devoted his time supporting various charitable causes, particularly in the area of literacy and education. He is the founder of AR Foundation Inc., a scholarship program that helps underprivileged students finish college. Richards serves as a member of Mowelfund Inc. Board of Trustees since 2023. He is the global ambassador for the Overseas Workers Welfare Administration.

== Early life and education ==
Richard Reyes Faulkerson Jr. was born on January 2, 1992, in Quezon City and raised in Santa Rosa, Laguna to Richard Peralta Faulkerson Sr. and Rosario Reyes Faulkerson. He is the second child in the family with an older brother and two younger sisters. He is of American descent through his father who is half-Filipino and half-American and his American paternal grandfather. His grandfather died in California when he was only three years old.

He studied at Paco Catholic School in Manila but transferred to another school when his family moved to Laguna. He graduated high school from Colegio de Santa Rosa de Lima. In college, he attended De La Salle University, Canlubang with a degree in Business Administration, but paused his studies when his mother died of pneumonia in 2008. To help his family financially, he pursued his late mother's wish for him to become an actor and adopted the stage name Alden Richards.

In April 2025, Richards enrolled at Alpha Aviation Group, an aviation school to fulfill his father's dream and his own childhood dream of becoming a pilot. He began his pilot training in July 2025.

== Career ==
=== 2010–2014: Breakthrough ===
After modeling and male pageant stints, Richards auditioned and secured the role of Jomari on the series Alakdana, directed by Mac C Alejandre with co-stars Louise delos Reyes and Paulo Avelino. For the role, he won a Golden Screen Television Award for Breakthrough Performance by an Actor and received nomination for New Male Television Personality at the 25th PMPC Star Awards for Television. He was cast on teen-drama series Tween Hearts, directed by Gina Alajar and its film adaptation Tween Academy: Class of 2012, directed by Mark A. Reyes. He was also part of GMA' Sunday variety shows Party Pilipinas, Sunday All Stars and the comedy-horror series Spooky Nights.

He appeared on fantasy-action movie Ang Panday 2, directed by Mac C. Alejandre, replacing Aljur Abrenica role as Hubli He was on the horror movie The Road, directed by Yam Laranas; playing the teenager Luis Medina. His performance was praised by critics. Some entertainment writers predicted that he would become the next big star of the network. He appeared in supporting roles on My Beloved and CBN Asia' UNOS (Calamity) in the 4th week special Tanikala. Richards continued working with Louise delos Reyes and director Andoy Ranay on romantic drama series One True Love, playing the role of Tisoy and Mundo Mo'y Akin, playing the role of Jerome. His portrayal on the shows earned him a nomination for an Outstanding Performance by an Actor at the Golden Screen Television Awards. On October 25, 2013, Richards signed an exclusive contract with GMA Network.

As a recording artist, Richards debuted on Party Pilipinas #SummerCrush episode. In April 2013, he launched his first single Haplos, a revival of Shamrock song which was released on iTunes and MyMusic Store. His self-titled album Alden Richards was released by Universal Records on May 26, 2013. Haplos was used as a soundtrack on television series Mundo mo'y Akin while his other songs Di na Mababawi at Sa Aking Tabi were used in the comedy-drama series With a Smile and the Korean series Seoyoung, My Daughter, which was dubbed in Filipino He was featured Myx Celebrity VJ for the month of June 2013. Richards received New Male Recording Artist of the Year nomination at the 27th Awit Awards and 6th Star Awards for Music.

In 2014, Richards starred with Marian Rivera on Carmela, a drama series, directed by Dominic Zapata. His version of the song Naalala Ka from his debut album was used as the end theme song for the series. That same year, he played national hero José Rizal on the biographical drama series Ilustrado, directed by King Mark Baco. For the role, he won Best Actor award at the 29th PMPC Star Awards for Television. He was the only nominee from his home network against a field of respected actors from the rival network. He co-hosted Bet ng Bayan, a reality competition show with Regine Velasquez. He acted opposite veteran actress Nora Aunor on Kinabukasan, a short film directed by Adolfo Alix Jr.

=== 2015–2021: Rise to prominence ===
In 2015, Richards became part of the longest-running variety, noontime show Eat Bulaga! as co-host in That's my Bae segment. On July 16, 2015, he was paired with Maine Mendoza accidentally in the segment of Juan For All, All for Juan and they became a loveteam known as AlDub. Because of their popularity, a sketch comedy series called Kalyeserye was created for them; Richards played different roles including a fictionalized version of himself.

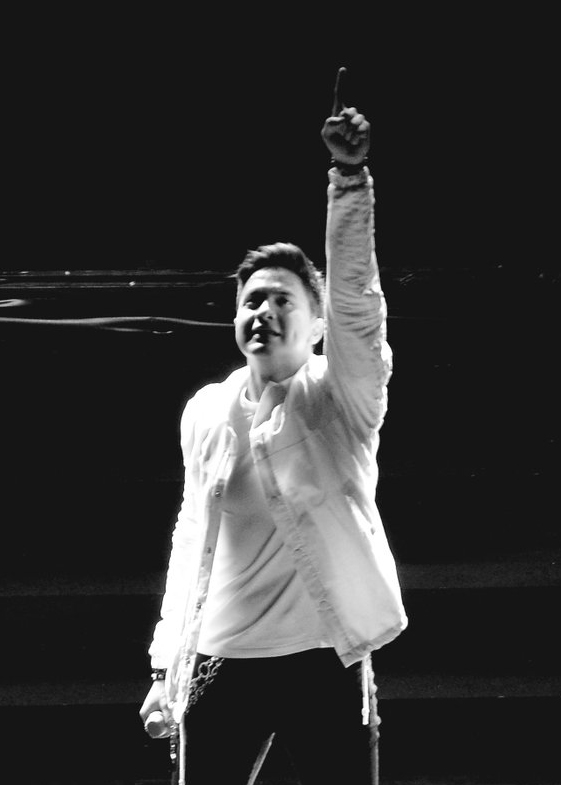
Richards in his 2017 Upsurge concert

In August 2015, Richards signed a four-year film contract with APT Entertainment and a recording contract with GMA Records. His second album Wish I May was launched on October 17, 2015, in SM North Edsa. The album contained two original songs and the rest were renditions. The first single Wish I May was an original composition by Agat Obar-Morallo and was released a month earlier for online downloading and streaming. His song landed the top spot on iTunes(PH) Songs chart. The second album was certified gold record from Philippine Association of the Record Industry (PARI) prior to its official released.

In October 2015, his debut album Alden Richards earned gold record from PARI and ranked number 10 at the Billboard World Albums chart. In the same month, Universal Records released a special edition of his debut album including AlDub theme song God Gave Me You by Bryan White, thus helping his album turned into platinum record in November. His second album Wish I May received 2× platinum record in December 2015; it turned 7× platinum record by July and earned a Diamond Record award from PARI in October 2016.

In December 2015, Richards and Maine Mendoza starred on romantic comedy film, My Bebe Love: KiligPaMore alongside Vic Sotto and AiAi delas Alas, directed by Jose Javier Reyes, which was an official entry to 41st Metro Manila Film Festival. Richards was inducted to Philippines Walk of Fame with his co-stars from Kalyeserye in Eastwood City, Quezon City. He returned to big screen with Maine Mendoza on Imagine You and Me, directed by Michael Tuveira. The film was released on July 13, 2016. The following year, they starred their first primetime television series Destined to be Yours, directed by Irene Villamore and headlined Love is... a television film directed by Adolfo Alix Jr and produced by Eat Bulaga!.

He released his book entitled Alden Richards: In My Own Words in July 2016. Aside from being a regular host on Eat Bulaga! and Sunday PinaSaya, he appeared as guest star in Lip Sync Battle Philippines, That's My Amboy and the reboot fantasy series Encantadia. Richards renewed his contract with GMA Network in September 2016. He co-hosted the 21st Asian Television Awards in Singapore.

Richards played real-life activist Bonifacio Ilagan on Alaala: A Martial Law Special, a docudrama directed by Adolfo Alix Jr. and written by Boni Ilagan with co-stars Bianca Umali and Rocco Nacino. The show premiered in September 2017. The special won silver medal at the New York Festival TV and Film Awards. Richards and program manager Joy Madrigal received the award. In 2018, he played the titular role of Victor Magtanggol, an action-drama fantasy series directed by Dominic Zapata.

After being on movie hiatus for almost 3 years, Richards starred with Kathryn Bernardo on Star Cinema's Hello, Love, Goodbye, directed by Cathy Garcia-Molina in 2019. The film became one of the highest grossing Filipino movie of all time. In September 2019, he starred on drama series The Gift, directed by Lord Alvin Madridejos with co-stars Jean Garcia, Joe Berry and Ysabel Ortega.

In 2020, Richards was honored with Ani ng Dangal by National Commission for Culture and the Arts and a recipient of Asian Star Prize in Seoul International Drama Awards in South Korea. He returned to All-Out Sundays, a musical variety show. In July 2021, he starred with Jasmine Curtis-Smith on The World Between Us directed by Dominic Zapata with co-stars Jaclyn Jose and Dina Bonnieve.

=== 2022–present ===
In March 2023, he returned to Eat Bulaga! after a year-long hiatus from the show, focusing on other projects including the TV series Start-Up PH, working with Bea Alonzo in 2022. The series was directed by Jerry Lopez Sineneng and Dominic Zapata.

Richards and Julia Montes starred on Five Breakups and a Romance; directed by Irene Emma Villamor. The movie was the first collaboration of GMA Pictures, Cornerstone Studios, and Myriad Entertainment. In an interview, Sharon Cuneta revealed that she and Richards would be featured in a film, Family of Two directed by Nuel Naval and produced by CineKo Productions. It was shown at the 2023 Metro Manila Film Festival.

He played the lead role in Magpakailanman: Sa Puso't Isipan, directed by Gina Alajar with co-stars Chris Villanueva, Jackie Lou Blanco and Therese Malvar. The episode won for Best Single Drama Anthology National Winner at the 2024 Asian Academy Creative Awards. The episode first premiered in August 2023. It was re-aired in January 2025.

He co-hosted the 2023 Miss Universe Philippines with Xian Lim. Richards returned to host the 2024 Miss Universe Philippines with Gabbi Garcia, Tim Yap and former Ms. Universe R'Bonney Gabriel, held at Mall of Asia.

He joined the war action, drama series Pulang Araw, directed by Dominic Zapata with an ensemble cast of Dennis Trillo, Barbie Forteza, David Licauco and Sanya Lopez. He played the role of Eduardo Dela Cruz, one of the guerillas. The series aired on Netflix from July to December 2024. In November 2024, Richards was reunited with Bernardo in Hello, Love, Again, directed by Cathy Garcia-Sampana. The movie became the highest-grossing Filipino films of all time. This was the first movie studio collaboration between Star Cinema and GMA Pictures. The film debut on Netflix in February 2025.

In June 2025, he hosted Stars on the Floor, a reality dance competition with Marian Rivera, Pokwang and SB19 choreographer Jay Joseph Roncesvalles served as the dance judges. That same month, Richards announced his first directed film, titled Out of Order co-starring Heaven Peralejo and Nonie Buencamino Out of Order was an official entry to 3rd Da Nang Asian Film Festival (DNAFF) in Vietnam and Jagran Film Festival in India In December 2025, Richards was inducted to Anak TV Seal Awards, Hall of Fame.

In February 2026, he returns to host for the season 2 of Stars on the Floor. He stars with Nadine Lustre in Love, Siargao, a romcom series which was released on June 26, 2026 on Viu.

== Other ventures ==
=== Modeling and endorsements ===
Aside from being an actor, Alden Richards has also done modeling stints. In 2010, he ranked 4th on the list of Candy Magazine's "Celebrity Cuties". In July 2012, Richards was on the cover of MEGA Magazine with Kapuso co-actors dubbed as "GMA's new breed of rising talents". From this time onwards, he has continued to appear in a number of magazines, while being featured in several endorsements.

=== Philanthropy ===
After the devastation of Typhoon Haiyan in 2013, Richards helped with the relief efforts initiated by GMA Kapuso Foundation. For more than 10 years, he has supported Holy Trinity Home for Children, an orphanage in Quezon City. Since 2013, he would visit the orphanage by bringing foods, gifts and playing games with the abandoned kids. He was part of Department of Health (DOH) Pilipinas Go4Health campaign which aimed in promoting healthy lifestyle. Richards became Habitat for Humanity ambassador for Philippines in 2014. For three years, he spent his time by building homes alongside other volunteers and families in Payatas, Quezon City. He spent his post-birthday celebration with Aeta people in Tarlac for his outreach program in February 2016, he returned to build a school for them in 2019.

In 2015, Richards was in #NowPH Climate change campaign by the National Youth Commission (NYC) and the Climate Change Commission (CCC). He became Boardwalk's ambassador for Young Emerging Sociopreneurs campaign which encouraged students to earn money while still in school After joining Philippine Red Cross in 2015 Nation's Blood Drive project, he returned to donate blood for Kapuso Foundation Blood letting project with Red Cross for two consecutive years.

He participated in Make-A-Wish Foundation program for seriously ill-children in 2017. The next year, he joined Dr. Vicki Belo outreach program for cancer patients at Philippine Children's Medical Center on Valentine's Day. He helped build a school for cultural minorities known as Mangyan in Mindoro in 2019. In November 2019, Richards became Ronald McDonald House Charities (RMHC) ambassador and raised awareness by joining fund-raising events for learn to read program.

In early 2020, he converted his restaurant to a temporary donation center to raise donations for the affected residents of Taal Volcano eruption. He was chosen by Department of Health (DOH) Bida Solusyon campaign for COVID-19 prevention in July and Resbakuna campaign to promote vaccination against the virus in August 2020. He donated a thousand food packs to indigent families and health workers affected by pandemic. Richards was chosen by United States Agency for International Development (USAID) for Philippines End Tuberculosis campaign. In November 2020, he run a donation drive with AR game live-streaming for victims of Typhoon Vamco.

He established the AR Foundation, Inc. (2021), a college scholarship program which supports low-income students. By August 2023, AR Foundation has 27 scholars; some of them have already graduated from college. He became Philippine Animal Welfare Society (PAWS) ambassador in 2022. He participated in Century Tuna's Save our Seas campaign (SOS) for beach and coral reef clean-up drive in Batangas.

In September 2023, Richards became the youngest member of Movie Workers Welfare Foundation (Mowelfund) He joined Dingdong Dantes in celebrating Mowelfund 50th Anniversary. Richards and Dantes were introduced as members of Mowelfund's Board of Trustees in March 2024. At the event, his company helped set-up free medical mission with cash raffle prizes to Mowelfund members. He donated a thousand McDonald's burgers with portable water alongside hot meals from Kapuso Soup Kitchen to victims of Typhoon Carina in Navotas in July 2024.

In partnership with Mowelfund and Green Media Events, he announced Lights, Camera, Run (Takbo para sa Pelikulang Pilipino), a fun-run raising event for the benefits of Mowelfund members on May 11, 2025. He spent his early morning with book reading to Palatiw Elementary School students in Pasig City. In April 2025, he participated in the annual Run to Share, a run for fitness with a cause for the benefit of I Want To Share Foundation in support of children with cancer at Philippine General Hospital.

In November 2025, Richard was introduced as global ambassador of Overseas Workers Welfare Administration (OWWA) by Patricia Yvonne Caunan, OWWA administrator. In December 2015, he spent his whole day in Tahanan Walang Hagdan (People with Disabilities) in Rizal, Orthopedic Department of East Avenue Medical Center and Philippine Animal Welfare Society (PAWS) in Quezon City.

=== Business ===
In 2016, Richards ventured in his first food business with co-owner Gemma Sembrano, a chef, and opened Concha's Garden, a restaurant with Filipino heirloom recipes located in Tagaytay. From a single branch, the restaurant has now several branches located in Tagaytay; Silang, Cavite; and Talisay, Batangas. He is a franchise owner of McDonald's with branches in Biñan and Santa Rosa, Laguna. He is a co-owner of Stardust, a restobar located in Makati. He is also a franchise owner of Hungry Pita, a Filipino-styled shawarma restaurant. Richards and his father, Richard Sr., own a construction firm and a real estate business.

In 2022, he established his own multimedia company, Myriad Entertainment Corporation, a company that organized the reunion concert of rock band Eraserheads entitled Huling El Bimbo, where Richards served as the co-producer.

== Personal life ==
Richards is a practicing Catholic.

His hometown is Santa Rosa, Laguna, although he is currently living in Quezon City.

He is a mountaineer, a jogger/runner, a cyclist, and a gamer.

== Filmography ==
Richards appeared in 21 movies and 17 television series in the course of his career. He was in critically acclaimed movies The Road (2012), The Day After (2014) and Alaala: A Martial Law Special (2017). His most commercially successful films include Ang Panday 2 (2011), Si Agimat, si Enteng Kabisote at si Ako (2012), My Bebe Love: KiligPaMore (2015), Imagine You and Me (2016), Five Breakups and a Romance (2023) including Hello, Love, Goodbye (2019) and Hello, Love, Again (2024) which are among the highest-grossing Filipino films of all time. He released his directorial feature film titled, Out of Order (2025).

On television, he starred in various series Alakdana (2011), One True Love (2012), Mundo Mo'y Akin (2013), Carmela (2014), Illustrado (2014), Kalyeserye (2015–2016), Destined to be Yours (2017), Victor Magtanggol (2018), The Gift (2019–2020), Pamilya Nunal (2020–2022), The World Between Us (2021–2022), Start-Up PH (2022), Pulang Araw (2024) and Love, Siargao (2026), Code Grey (2026).

== Discography ==
Richards has released four studio albums, two soundtrack albums, three compilation albums and eight singles including two promotional non-singles and a movie soundtrack. His studio albums include his self-titled EP Alden Richards (2013), Say it Again (2016), Until I see you again (2018) and Wish I May (2015) which is considered one of the best-selling albums in the Philippines.

== Tours ==
Concert tours

- Alden Richards: Live in Dubai! (2016)
- Alden Richards: Live in Doha! (2016)
- Alden Richards: Live Aldenvasion (2016)
- One Fine Day with Bae in Singapore (2016)
- One Fine Day with Bae in Hongkong (2016)
- Alden Richards: Upsurge (2017)
- Alden Richards: Adrenaline Rush (2018)
- Alden Richards: Live in Sydney! (2018)
- ForwARd: Meet Richard R. Faulkerson Jr.
  concert series in USA (2022)

Digital concerts

- Alden's Reality: The Virtual Reality Concert (2020)
- ForwARd: Meet Richard R. Faulkerson Jr. (2020)

Collaboration concerts

- At Last in London, UK (2016)
- Kalyserye Aldub sa USA concert series (2017)
- Cebuanna Lhuillier's "Thank you for 30"
  concert series (2017)
- EB Dabarkads in Dubai (2019)
- Sparkada Trenta: The 30th Anniversary

Music and cultural festivals

- Fiesta ko Texas in Houston, USA (2017)
- Taste of Manila in Canada (2024)
- London Barrio Fiesta (2025)

Promotional concerts with GMA Pinoy TV

- Kapusong Pinoy sa Vancouver (2015)
- Kapusong Pinoy sa Anahiem (2015)
- Kapusong Pinoy sa New York (2015)
- Kapusong Pinoy sa Japan (2015)
- Kapusong Pinoy sa Dubai (2016)
- Sikat ka Kapuso Long Beach (2017)
- Sikat ka Kapuso New Jersey (2018)
- Sikat ka Kapuso Toronto, Canada (2018)
- Kapusong Pinoy Musikalye sa Brooklyn NY (2019)
- Sparkle World Tour in Anaheim, California (2024)
- Sparkle World Tour in San Francisco (2024)
- Sparkle World Tour in Calgary Alberta (2024)

Charity concerts

- PLDT:116th Anniversary: Freedom Concert (2014)
- EB AlDub Tamang Panahon (2015)
- For the Love of Mama (2015)
- Handog Pamasko with Alden Richards (2015)
- A Date with Ultimate Pambansang Bae (2016)
- Reborn: 1 Walker Worship Concert (2016)
- Song from a Silver World (2016)
- Alden Richards Upsurge (2017)
- 10th Anniversary Gabay Guro (2017)
- Alden Richards Adrenaline Rush (2018)
- The Kuhl 2nd event (2018)
- PMPC: Awit ng Pandemya (2021)
- Forward: Meet Richard R. Faulkerson, Jr. (2022)

== Accolades ==
Richards has received several accolades throughout his career including five PMPC Star Awards for Movies, eight GMMSF Box-Office Entertainment Awards, six PMPC Star Awards for Television, three Gawad Tanglaw Awards, two FAMAS Award, two EDDY's Award, two Gawad Pasado Awards, a Seoul International Drama Award, Jinseo Arigato International Film Festival Award (JAIFF), a Golden Screen Television Award and Film Actor of the Year at the EdukCircle Awards, in addition to receiving nominations from Gawad Urian, Golden Screen Movie Award, Manila International Film Festival and Metro Manila Film Festival.

Aside from acting, he also ventured into music and won several awards for his albums including eight PMPC Star Awards for Music, three Awit Awards, three GMMSF Box Office Entertainment Awards for music, a Myx Music Awards, an Aliw Award and a Diamond Record Award from Philippine Association of the Record Industry (PARI).

He was honored with Ani ng Dangal Award by National Commission for Culture and the Arts (NCCA), the Asia' Influential Leadership Award, Film Development Council of the Philippines' Luminary Leading Man ng Sentenaryo in Sine Sandaan. EdukCircle Awards one of the most influential celebrities of the decade. He was also inducted to Anak TV Seal Awards Hall of Fame, Philippines Walk of Fame and Natatangi Filipino Awards Lifetime Achievement Award. Tatler Asia named him as one of the Gen. T Leaders of Tomorrow.

=== Solo awards ===
Year	Nominee / work	Award	Result
2011	1st Yahoo! OMG Awards	Amazing Male Newcomer	Won
2011	59th FAMAS Awards	German Moreno Youth Achievement Award	Won
2011	Golden Screen TV Awards	Outstanding Breakthrough Performance by an Actor for Alakdana	Won
2011	25th PMPC Star Awards for Television	Best New Male TV Personality for Alakdana	Nominated
2012	Golden Screen TV Awards	Breakthrough Performance by an Actor for The Road	Nominated
2012	28th PMPC Star Awards for Movies	New Movie Actor of the Year for The Road	Nominated
2013	Golden Screen TV Awards	Outstanding Performance by an Actor in a Drama Series for One True Love	Nominated
2014	27th Awit Awards	Best Performance by a New Recording Artist for Self-Titled Album: Haplos	Nominated
2014	Golden Screen TV Awards	Outstanding Performance by an Actor in a Drama Series for Mundo Mo'y Akin	Nominated
2014	6th PMPC Star Awards for Music	New Male Recording Artist of the Year for Self-Titled Album	Nominated
2014	28th PMPC Star Awards for Television	Best Single Performance by an Actor for Magpakailanman: The Dondon Lanuza Story	Nominated
2015	29th PMPC Star Awards for Television	Best Drama Actor for Ilustrado	Won
2015	29th PMPC Star Awards for Television	Best Talent Search Program Host for Bet ng Bayan with Regine Velasquez	Nominated
2015	Mega Man Nov 2015 issue	Starmometer's 2015 Cover Guy of the Year	Won
2015	Catholic Social Media Awards	Catholic Social Media Achievement Awardee	Won
2015	Eastwood City Walk of Fame	Walk of Fame Star	Inducted
2015	41st Metro Manila Film Festival	Best Supporting Actor for My Bebe Love #KiligPaMore	Nominated
2016	People Choice Awards (People Asia Magazine)	People of the Year	Won
2016	Anak TV Seal Awards 2016	Male Makabata Star Awardee	Included
2016	USTv Students' Choice Awards	Students' Choice of Variety Show Host for Eat Bulaga!	Nominated
2016	Myx Music Awards 2016	Favorite Male Artist for Wish I May	Nominated
2016	Myx Music Awards 2016	Favorite Mellow Video for Wish I May; Directed by Louie Ignacio	Nominated
2016	Myx Music Awards 2016	Favorite Guest Appearance in a Music Video for "Kapangyarihan Ng Pag-Ibig" by Aicelle Santos	Won
2016	47th GMMSF Box-Office Entertainment Awards	Breakthrough Recording/Performing Artist for Wish I May	Won
2016	47th GMMSF Box-Office Entertainment Awards	Breakthrough Male Star of Philippine Movies and TV	Won
2016	14th Gawad Tanglaw Awards	Best Single Performance by an Actor for Magpakailanman: The Alden Richards Story	Won
2016	MPS Online Awards	Favorite Artist of the Year for Wish I May	Won
2016	MPS Online Awards	Album of the Year for Wish I May	Nominated
2016	MPS Online Awards	Favorite OPM Song for Wish I May	Nominated
2016	3rd PEPList Awards – Editor's Choice	Male TV Star of the Year	Won
2016	3rd PEPList Awards – Editor's Choice	Best PEPTalk episode	Won
2016	3rd PEPList Awards – Editor's Choice	Male Stylish Star of the Year	Won
2016	University of Perpetual Help System Dalta's 2nd Alta Media Icon Awards	Most Promising Male TV Star	Won
2016	6th EdukCircle Awards	5 Most Influential Male Celebrity Endorsers of the Year	Included
2016	6th EdukCircle Awards	Male Music Artist of the Year for Wish I May	Won
2016	30th PMPC Star Awards for Television	Best Single Performance by an Actor for Eat Bulaga! Lenten Special: God Gave Me You	Nominated
2016	8th PMPC Star Awards for Music	Pop Album of the Year for Wish I May	Won
2016	8th PMPC Star Awards for Music	Album of the Year for Wish I May	Won
2016	8th PMPC Star Awards for Music	Song of the Year Wish I May	Won
2016	8th PMPC Star Awards for Music	Male Pop Artist of the Year for Wish I May	Won
2016	29th Awit Awards	Best Selling Album of the Year for Wish I May	Won
2016	29th Awit Awards	Most Downloaded Song 2015 for Wish I May	Won
2016	29th Awit Awards	Most Downloaded Artist for Wish I May	Won
2016	Philippine Association of the Record Industry	Diamond Record for Wish I May	Included
2017	Inside Showbiz People's Choice Awards	Male Trending Star of 2016	Won
2017	MPS Online Awards	Favorite Male OPM Artist	Won
2017	MPS Online Awards	Favorite Album of the Year Say it Again	Won
2017	MPS Online Awards	Favorite OPM Song of the Year Rescue Me	Won
2017	Myx Music Awards 2017	Favorite Male Artist for Say It Again Album	Nominated
2017	48th GMMSF Box-Office Entertainment Awards	Prince of Philippine Movies for Imagine You and Me	Won
2017	48th GMMSF Box-Office Entertainment Awards	Male Recording Artist of the Year for Say It Again Album	Won
2017	33rd PMPC Star Awards for Movies	Movie Actor of the Year for Imagine You and Me	Nominated
2017	33rd PMPC Star Awards for Movies	Movie Original Theme Song Interpreter of the Year for Imagine You and Me	Won
2017	9th ComGuild Media Awards	Most Loved Male Teen Endorser	Won
2017	7th EdukCircle Awards	5 Most Influential Male Celebrity Endorsers of the Year	Included
2017	31st PMPC Star Awards for Television	Best Single Performance by an Actor for Eat Bulaga! Lenten Special: Kapatid	Won
2017	31st PMPC Star Awards for Television	Best Male TV Host for Eat Bulaga!	Nominated
2017	Wish 107.5 Music Awards	Wish Original Song of the Year by a Male Artist for Rescue Me	Nominated
2017	Anak TV Seal Awards 2017	Male Makabata Star Awardee	Included
2017	NAMIC Excellence in Multicultural Marketing Awards (EMMA) in New York	Social Media Take—Over: Alden Richards Online Event	Won
2018	49th GMMSF Box Office Entertainment Awards	Male Recording Artist of the Year	Won
2018	New York Festivals TV and Film Awards 2018	Silver Award for Alaala: A Martial Law Special	Won
2018	U.S International Film and Video Festival 2018	Gold Camera Docudrama for Alaala: A Martial Law Special	Won
2018	10th PMPC Star Awards For Music	Male Pop Artist of the Year for Say It Again Album	Won
2018	10th PMPC Star Awards For Music	Pop Album of the Year for Say It Again Album	Won
2018	10th PMPC Star Awards For Music	Album of the Year for Say It Again Album	Won
2018	10th ComGuild Media Awards	Most Popular TV Personality of the Year	Won
2018	2018 Aliw Awards	Best Major Concert—Alden's Adrenaline Rush	Nominated
2018	Garage Magazine	Best Dressed Men in the Street Dapper 2018	Won
2018	8th EdukCircle Awards	5 Most Influential Male Celebrity Endorsers of the Year	Included
2018	Asia's Total Entertainment Blog Starmometer	Sexiest Man in the Philippines of 2018	Won
2018	Anak TV Seal Awards 2018	Male Makabata Star Awardee	Included
2018	32nd PMPC Star Awards for Television	Best Male TV Host for Eat Bulaga!	Won
2019	Film Ambassadors' Night 2019	TV documentary for Alaala: A Martial Law Special	Won
2019	Myx Music Awards 2019	Remake of the Year for I Will Be Here Song	Nominated
2019	Paragala Central Luzon Media Awards	Best Male Recording Artist for I Will Be Here Song	Nominated
2019	Inside Showbiz Awards 2019	Showbiz Personality of the Year	Won
2019	35th PMPC Star Awards for Movies	Darling of the Press	Nominated
2019	9th EdukCircle Awards	Best Male Noontime Show Host	Nominated
2019	9th EdukCircle Awards	5 Most Influential Male Celebrity Endorsers of the Year	Included
2019	Young Educators Convergence of Soccsksargen, Inc (YECS); 5th Aral-Parangal 2019	Movie Actor of the Year for Hello, Love, Goodbye	Won
2019	14th Seoul International Drama Awards 2019	Asian Star Prize	Included
2019	Okada Icon Awards 2019	First Celebrity of the Year	Won
2019	University of Perpetual Help System Dalta's 5th Alta Media Icon Awards	Most Influential Male TV Personality	Won
2019	Sine Sandaan Event – Film Development Council of the Philippines	Luminary Leading Men ng Sentenaryo	Won
2019	33rd PMPC Star Awards for Television	Best Drama Actor for Victor Magtanggol	Nominated
2019	33rd PMPC Star Awards for Television	Best Single Performance by an Actor for Eat Bulaga! Lenten Special: Bulawan	Nominated
2019	Asia's Total Entertainment Blog Starmometer	Sexiest Man in the Philippines of 2019	Won
2019	11th ComGuild Media Awards	Most Popular TV Personality of the Year	Won
2019	Mulat Media Awards	Championing OFW Recognition for Hello, Love, Goodbye	Included
2019	Rawr Awards – LionHeartTV	Actor of the Year for Hello, Love, Goodbye	Won
2019	Rawr Awards – LionHeartTV	Earthy Energy: Earth Award	Won
2019	Rawr Awards – LionHeartTV	Movie of the Year Hello, Love, Goodbye	Won
2019	1st Biliran Province State University Student Choice Awards For Media	Most Popular TV Personality of the Year	Won
2019	Anak TV Seal Awards 2019	Male Makabata Star Awardee	Included
2019	Lustre Awards 2019	Outstanding Fashion Collaborator of the Year for AvelxAlden	Won
2019	10th TV Series Craze Awards 2019	Lead Actor of the Year	Won
2019	11th PMPC Star Awards for Music	Male Recording Artist of the Year for Until I See You Again Album	Nominated
2019	11th PMPC Star Awards for Music	Male Pop Artist of the Year for Until I See You Again Album	Nominated
2019	11th PMPC Star Awards for Music	Pop Album of the Year for Until I See You Again	Won
2019	11th PMPC Star Awards for Music	Collaboration of the Year for Superhero Mo Song with The Ex-Battalion	Nominated
2019	2019 Comguild Academe's Choice Awards	Male Endorser of the Year	Nominated
2019	2019 Comguild Academe's Choice Awards	Advertisers Friendly Male Host	Nominated
2019	VP Choice Awards	Movie Actor of the Year for Hello, Love, Goodbye	Won
2019	VP Choice Awards	Movie of the Year Hello, Love, Goodbye	Won
2020	2020 Gawad Lasallianeta	Most Influential Male Celebrity	Nominated
2020	2020 Gawad Lasallianeta	Most Outstanding Male TV Lead Dramatic Actor for The Gift	Nominated
2020	2020 Gawad Lasallianeta	Most Effective Male Celebrity Endorser	Nominated
2020	2020 Gawad Lasallianeta	Most Outstanding Filipino Film for Hello, Love, Goodbye	Won
2020	Guild of Educators, Mentors and Students (Hiyas ng Sining)	Best Actor for Hello, Love, Goodbye	Nominated
2020	Guild of Educators, Mentors and Students (Hiyas ng Sining)	Best Actor in a Single Performance for Eat Bulaga! Bulawan	Nominated
2020	Guild of Educators, Mentors and Students (Hiyas ng Sining)	Best TV Series Actor for The Gift	Won
2020	Guild of Educators, Mentors and Students (Hiyas ng Sining)	Best TV Series for The Gift	Nominated
2020	Guild of Educators, Mentors and Students (Hiyas ng Sining)	Best Mainstream Film for Hello, Love, Goodbye	Won
2020	51st GMMSF Box-Office Entertainment Awards	Phenomenal Star of Philippine Cinema for Hello, Love, Goodbye	Won
2020	51st GMMSF Box-Office Entertainment Awards	Film Actor of the Year for Hello, Love, Goodbye	Won
2020	12th Ani ng Dangal Awards (National Commission for Culture and the Arts)	Recipient for Ani ng Dangal Awards	Included
2020	Inside Showbiz Awards 2020	Best TV Actor	Won
2020	Inside Showbiz Awards 2020	Most Outstanding Male Artist	Won
2020	Inside Showbiz Awards 2020	Best Male Endorser	Won
2020	Inside Showbiz Awards 2020	Sexiest Male Artist	Won
2020	22nd Gawad PASADO	Pinaka PASADONG Aktor for Hello, Love, Goodbye	Won
2020	1st Gawad Pelikula Pilipinas (GAPEFIL) 2019	Male Breakthrough Performance for Hello, Love, Goodbye	Nominated
2020	18th Gawad Tanglaw Awards	Film Acting Awardee for Hello, Love, Goodbye	Included
2020	43rd Gawad Urian Awards	Best Actor for Hello, Love, Goodbye	Nominated
2020	Pampelikulang Samahan Ng Mga Dalubguro (Philippine Normal University)	Pinaka PASADONG Aktor for Hello, Love, Goodbye	Won
2020	10th EdukCircle Awards	Film Actor of the Year	Won
2020	10th EdukCircle Awards	Most Influential Celebrity of the Decade	Included
2020	Rawr Awards 2019 – LionHeartTV	Actor of the Year for The Gift	Won
2020	68th FAMAS Awards	Best Performances of the Year, Actor for Hello, Love, Goodbye	Nominated
2020	World Music Awards (10 Songs in the Philippines)	Top 8 for Goin' Crazy	Included
2020	42nd Catholic Mass Media Awards	Best Drama Series for The Gift	Won
2021	7th Urduja Heritage Film Awards	Best Actor for Hello, Love, Goodbye	Included
2021	5th Guild of Educators, Mentors and Students (Hiyas ng Sining)	Best Male Variety Show Host for All-Out Sundays	Nominated
2021	5th Film Ambassadors' Night	11 New Film Ambassadors for Acting Performance (Asian Star Prize)	Included
2021	FNET Critics Awards 2021	Man of the Decade	Won
2021	2nd VP Choice Awards	VP Cover of the Year	Won
2021	36th PMPC Star Awards for Movies	Movie Actor of the Year for Hello, Love, Goodbye	Won
2021	PEP 15 Greatest Actors of Philippine Cinema in Leading Roles	Greatest Movie Actors in Leading Roles (Top 11)	Included
2021	New York Festivals TV and Film Awards	2021 Finalist for Alden's Reality	Included
2021	3rd Laguna Excellence Awards	Outstanding Male Recording Artist of the Year for Goin' Crazy	Won
2021	34th PMPC Star Awards for Television	Best Drama Actor for The Gift	Nominated
2021	34th PMPC Star Awards for Television	Best Male TV host for Eat Bulaga!	Nominated
2021	TC Candler: Village Pipol Magazine	The 100 Most Handsome Faces of 2021	Nominated
2021	PH Choice Awards	Top 20 Male Host of Year 2021	Included
2021	PH Choice Awards	Top 1 Male Recording Artist of the Year	Won
2021	12th PMPC Star Awards for Music	Plaque of Appreciation for PMPC's Awit ng Pandemya Benefit Concert	Included
2021	2021 Tag Awards Chicago	Best Actor for The World Between Us	Won
2022	6th Guild of Educators, Mentors and Students (Hiyas ng Sining)	Best Performance in a Lead Role for The World Between Us	Won
2022	13th PMPC Star Awards for Music	Male Recording Artist of the Year for Goin' Crazy	Nominated
2022	13th PMPC Star Awards for Music	Male Concert Performer of the Year for Alden's Reality	Nominated
2022	LPU Golden Laurel Media Awards 2022	Most Inspiring Social Media Personality	Nominated
2022	Asean Excellence Achievers Awards 2022	Most Loved Male TV	Won
2022	Asean Excellence Achievers Awards 2022	Movie Personality of the Year	Won
2022	GMA Thanksgiving Gala 2022	Sparkle Star of the Night.	Won
2022	TC Candler	The 100 Most Handsome Faces of 2022	Nominated
2022	PHTV Fan Awards 2022	Favorite Drama Actor	Nominated
2022	2022 Tag Awards Chicago	Best Actor for Start-Up PH	Nominated
2022	Rawr Awards 2022 – LionHeartTV	Favorite Performer	Nominated
2022	5th Gawad Lasallianeta	Most Outstanding Actor in a Drama Series for Start-Up PH	Won
2022	5th Gawad Lasallianeta	Most Influential Male Filipino Celebrity	Nominated
2022	5th Gawad Lasallianeta	Most Outstanding Brand Endorser	Nominated
2022	Esquire Philippines' 2022 Man at His Best Awards	Entertainer of the Year	Included
2023	7th Guild of Educators, Mentors and Students (Hiyas ng Sining)	Best Performance by an Actor in a Lead Role for Start-Up PH	Nominated
2023	7th Guild of Educators, Mentors and Students (Hiyas ng Sining)	Best TV Program Host for All-Out Sundays	Nominated
2023	4th VP Choice Awards	TV Actor of the Year	Nominated
2023	Philippine National Esports League (PNEL)	2022 Positive Community Influencer of the Year	Won
2023	Philippine National Esports League (PNEL)	2022 Esports Personality of the Year	Nominated
2023	Philippine National Esports League (PNEL)	2022 Best Celebrity Gamer Awardee	Won
2023	12th Northwest Samar State University Student's Choice Awards for Radio and TV	Best Male Variety Show Host for All-Out Sundays	Won
2023	GMA Thanksgiving Gala 2023	Sparkle Star of the Night	Won
2023	Southeast Asian Premier Business and Achiever Award 2023	Premier Achiever Outstanding Entrepreneur	Won
2023	Southeast Asian Premier Business and Achiever Award 2023	Inspiring Male Celebrity Actor	Won
2023	6th Gawad Lasallianeta	Most Outstanding Film Actor for Five Breakups and a Romance	Won
2023	2023 Tag Awards Chicago	Male Celebrity of the Year	Won
2023	Anak TV Seal Awards 2023	Male Makabata Star Awardee	Included
2023	Anak TV Seal Awards 2023	Net Makabata Star Awardee	Included
2023	49th Metro Manila Film Festival	Best Actor for Family of Two	Nominated
2024	5th VP Choice Awards	Movie Actor of the Year for Five Breakups and a Romance	Won
2024	1st Manila International Film Festival	Best Actor for Family of Two	Nominated
2024	Asia's Influential Leader Awards	Asia's Exemplary Actor of the Year	Won
2024	Philippine Esports Awards	Esports and Gaming Positive Influencer of the Year	Nominated
2024	13th Northwest Samar State University Student's Choice Awards for Radio and TV	Best Reality Show Host for Battle of the Judges	Won
2024	Maharlika Filipino Awards	Maharlika Laureate for TV and Film	Won
2024	52nd GMMSF Box-Office Entertainment Awards	Box Office King for Five Breakups and a Romance	Won
2024	72nd FAMAS Awards	Best Actor for Family of Two	Nominated
2024	7th EDDYS Entertainment Editor's Choice	Box Office Hero for Five Breakups and a Romance	Included
2024	7th EDDYS Entertainment Editor's Choice	Best Actor for Five Breakups and a Romance	Nominated
2024	GMA Gala 2024	Aqua Boracay Tropical Trendsetter	Nominated
2024	40th PMPC Star Awards for Movies	Movie Actor of the Year for Five Breakups and a Romance	Won
2024	40th PMPC Star Awards for Movies	Darling of the Press	Nominated
2024	26th Gawad PASADO	Pinaka PASADONG Aktor for Family of Two	Nominated
2024	8th Guild of Educators, Mentors and Students (Hiyas ng Sining)	Best Performance by an Actor in a Lead Role for Family of Two	Won
2024	7th Gawad Lasallianeta	Most Outstanding Actor in a Drama Series for Pulang Araw	Nominated
2024	7th Gawad Lasallianeta	Most Outstanding Film Actor for Hello, Love, Again	Won
2024	7th Gawad Lasallianeta	Most Influential Celebrity	Nominated
2024	Anak TV Seal Awards 2024	Male Anak TV Makabata Star for Television	Included
2024	Asean Excellence Achievers Awards 2024	Most Outstanding Male Celebrity	Won
2024	Asean Excellence Achievers Awards 2024	Movie Actor of the Year	Won
2024	2024 Tag Awards Chicago	Best Actor for Pulang Araw	Nominated
2024	2024 Tag Awards Chicago	Best Actor for Hello, Love, Again	Nominated
2024	2024 Tag Awards Chicago	Male Celebrity of the Year	Won
2024	Jinseo Arigato International Film Festival	Best International Film Actor	Won
2024	Stevie Awards—International Business Awards Asia-Pacific	Best Business Influencer of the Year—Gold Stevie Award	Won
2025	4th Primetime Choice Media Awards	Best Actor for Hello, Love, Again	Won
2025	6th Village Pipol Choice Awards	Best Movie Actor for Hello, Love, Again	Nominated
2025	38th PMPC Star Awards for Television	Best Drama Actor for Pulang Araw	Nominated
2025	38th PMPC Star Awards for Television	Male Star of the Night	Won
2025	Manila Bulletin	Newsmaker of the Year	Won
2025	GMA Thanksgiving Denim Event 2025	Kapuso Male Heartthrob	Won
2025	Cinema Exhibitors' Association of the Philippines (CEAP)	Box Office King for Hello, Love, Again	Won
2025	Box Office Entertainment Awards	Phenomenal Box Office King for Hello, Love, Again	Won
2025	Box Office Entertainment Awards	Best Ensemble Acting for Hello, Love, Again	Won
2025	FAMAS Award	Best Actor for Hello, Love, Again	Nominated
2025	FAMAS Award	Bida sa Takilya Actor	Won
2025	The EDDYS Awards	Best Actor for Hello, Love, Again	Nominated
2025	The EDDYS Awards	Box Office Hero	Included
2025	PMPC Star Awards for Television	Best Male TV Host	Nominated
2025	PMPC Star Awards for Television	Best Single Performance by an Actor in Magpakailanman Sa Puso't Isipan	Won
2025	People's Asia	Men Who Matter (shares with Senator Tito Sotto, Senator Benigno "Bam" Aquino etc. .	Included
2025	ContentAsia Awards	Favorite Actor from the Philippines	Nominated
2025	International Golden Summit Excellence Awards in Vietnam	Male Celebrity of the Year	Won
2025	Manila Film Critics Circle Award	Best Actor for Hello, Love, Again	Nominated
2025	Manila Film Critics Circle Award	Box Office Circle Award	Won
2025	27th Gawad Pasado Awards	Pinakapasadong Aktor for Hello, Love, Again	Nominated
2025	Alta Media Icon Awards	Best Actor for Hello, Love Again	Won
2025	Inding Indie Excellence Awards	Pinakamahusay na Aktor ng Dekada	Won
2025	Tatler Asia	Gen. T Leaders of Tomorrow	Won
2025	11th Edukcircle Awards	Most Influential Celebrity of the Year	Won
2025	PMPC Star Awards for Movies	Movie Actor of the Year	Nominated
2025	PMPC Star Awards for Movies	Movie Ensemble Acting of the Year for Hello, Love, Again	Nominated
2025	PMPC Star Awards for Movies	Takilya King	Won
2025	8th Gawad Lasallianeta	Most Outstanding Brand Ambassador	Nominated
2025	8th Gawad Lasallianeta	Most Influential Celebrity	Nominated
2025	Anak TV Seal Awards	Net Makabata Award	Won
2025	Anak TV Seal Awards	Hall of Fame award	Won
2025	Artista Achievers Awards	People's Choice for Best Actor	Won
2026	3rd Philippines District Men and Women of Excellence	Top 16 Celebrities Achievers of the Decade	Included
2026	Parangal ng Natatangi Filipino Award	Lifetime Achievement Award and Distinguished Actor of the Year	Won
2026	VP Choice Awards	TV Host of the Year	Nominated
2026	7th Global Trends Business Leaders Awards	Excellence in Philippine Entertainment Award	Won
2026	Philippines Arts, Film and Television Awards	Box Office Star	Won
2026	City of Life (Laguna)	Entrepreneur of the Year	Won

== Book ==
- Richards, Alden (2016). Alden Richards: In My Own Words (First hardcover ed.). Mandaluyong City, Philippines: Summit Publishing Co. ISBN 9786214041244. OCLC 1183439037.
- Gozon-Tarriela, Flor; Jimenez, Butch (2015). Beyond All Barriers: Coincidence or Miracle. Anthology contributor by Richard Faulkerson Jr. (5th ed.). Philippines: Conquest for Christ Foundation. ISBN 9718698124.
