= The World Between Us (Philippine TV series) =

Philippine television drama series

- Title card
- Genre: Romantic drama
- Created by: Dode Cruz
- Written by: Glaiza Ramirez; Marlon Miguel; Patrick Ilagan
- Directed by: Dominic Zapata
- Creative director: Aloy Adlawan
- Starring: Alden Richards; Jasmine Curtis-Smith
- Theme music composer: Edwin G. Guerrero
- Opening theme: "Ang Aking Awitin" by Garrett Bolden and Thea Astley
- Country of origin: Philippines
- Original language: Tagalog
- No. of episodes: 75 (list of episodes)

Production
- Cinematography: Roman Theodossis
- Editors: Benedict Lavadista; Robert Reyes
- Camera setup: Multiple-camera setup
- Running time: 23–32 minutes
- Production company: GMA Entertainment Group

Original release
- Network: GMA Network
- Release: July 5, 2021 – January 7, 2022

The World Between Us is a Philippine television drama romance series broadcast by GMA Network. Directed by Dominic Zapata, it stars Alden Richards and Jasmine Curtis-Smith. It premiered on July 5, 2021 on the network's Telebabad line up. The series concluded on January 7, 2022, with a total of 75 episodes.

The series is streaming online on YouTube.

== Cast and characters ==
Cast

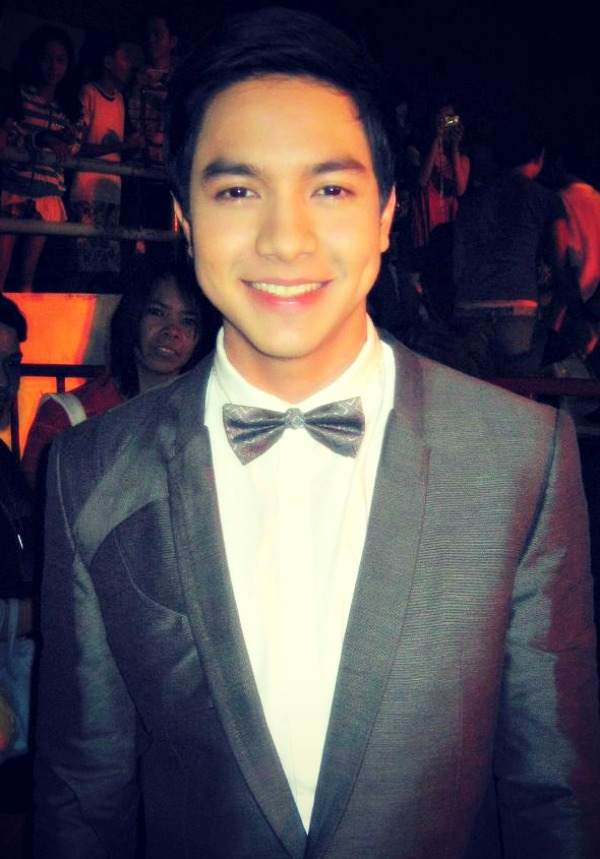
Alden Richards

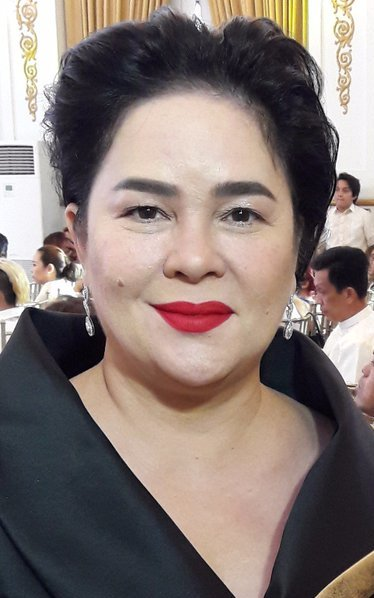
Jaclyn Jose

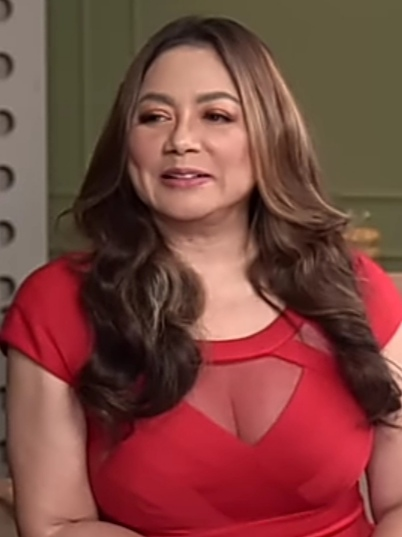
Dina Bonnevie

Lead cast

- Alden Richards as Luisito "Louie" Asuncion
- Jasmine Curtis-Smith as Emilia "Lia" Libradilla-Asuncion

Supporting cast

- Tom Rodriguez as Brian Libradilla / Brian Delgado
- Jaclyn Jose as Jacinta "Yachie" Delgado
- Dina Bonnevie as Rachel Cruz-Libradilla
- Sid Lucero as Eric Carlos
- Kelley Day as Audrey Villacer
- Yana Asistio as Jacqueline "Jackie" Carlos-Libradilla
- Don Bocco as Agapito "Pitoy" Flores
- Jericho Arceo as Edison Tomas
- Celeste Guevarra as Aira
- Lyra Micolob as Gina

Guest cast

- Glydel Mercado as Clara Asuncion
- Will Ashley as younger Brian
- Shanelle Agustin as younger Lia
- Izzy Canillo as younger Louie
- Ashley Rivera as younger Rachel
- Dion Ignacio as Franco Libradilla
- Faye Lorenzo as younger Yachie
- Jong Cuenco as Alvaro Villacer
- Seb Pajarillo as Aga
- Angelo Alagban as Karl
- Karl Aquino as Dexter
- Gould Aceron as Drew
- Manel Sevidal as Carla
- Ella Cristofani as Megan
- Ricky Davao as Emmanuelito "Emmanuel/Noli" Asuncion
- Mia Pangyarihan as Robin

== Production ==
Principal photography commenced in June 2021.

== Ratings ==
According to AGB Nielsen Philippines' Nationwide Urban Television Audience Measurement People in television homes, the pilot episode of The World Between Us earned a 13.9% rating. The final episode scored a 14.3% rating.
