= Love Is... (film) =

- Theatrical release poster
- Written by: Ma. Acy Ramos; Michelle Ngu
- Directed by: Adolf Alix, Jr.
- Starring: Alden Richards; Maine Mendoza
- Music by: Richard Gonzales
- Country of origin: Philippines
- Original language: Filipino

Production
- Producers: Antonio P. Tuviera; Annette Gozon Valdes
- Cinematography: Albert Banzon
- Editor: Michael Bayani Canino
- Running time: 88 minutes
- Production companies: TAPE Inc.; GMA Pictures; APT Entertainment

Original release
- Network: GMA Network
- Release: October 21, 2017

Love is... is a Philippine television film by Eat Bulaga! and was aired on October 21, 2017, at GMA Network without any commercial break. It was directed by Adolf Alix Jr. starring the AlDub love team of Alden Richards and Maine Mendoza. The main plot of the television film drama revolves around the effects of clinical depression to a person. Eat Bulaga! also released the whole television film on its official YouTube channel under Creative Commons Attribution License and distributed by GMA Pictures.

On the day that it was broadcast on television, the official hashtag of the show (#ALDUBxEBLoveIs) trended on Twitter where it landed on the top spot in the Philippines and the second spot worldwide. It generated around 1.38 million tweets even before the television film started. According to the AGB Nielsen, Love is... got a television rating of 7.8%, which is the highest percentage on its time slot.

== Plot ==
Vivienne (Mendoza) and Marco (Richards) prepare for their wedding after Marco proposes in Antipolo. While Marco's family is expected to cover all wedding expenses, Vivienne insists on contributing. She works hard as an associate creative director and social media influencer to save money for their marriage funds.

Vivienne runs into her cousin Edwin (Lopez), who offers her business opportunities. She discusses Edwin's offer with her father (Buencamino) and expresses her desire to invest in stocks to boost her wedding funds. Her father provides her with his retirement fund, earned from being an Overseas Filipino Worker, for the investment.

Vivienne's father suffers a stroke, forcing her to use her wedding funds for his medical expenses with Marco's consent. She also discovers that Edwin's business dealings are a sham. These events plunge Vivienne into sadness, affecting her work. Due to persistent negligence, she is forced to take a leave from work. This leads her to abandon her relationship with Marco, her friends, and her family, isolating herself in her bedroom for days without eating.

Marco continually tries to contact Vivienne, but she often avoids him. She finally responds when he invites her to a family dinner. At the dinner, Marco suspects Vivienne has clinical depression due to her behavior and appearance. He shares his concern with his mother (Pimentel) when Vivienne steps out. His mother suggests that Vivienne might be crazy, which Vivienne overhears. Upset, she walks away, and Marco runs after her to comfort her. However, Vivienne pushes him away, returns the engagement ring, and leaves him.

Vivienne goes to Antipolo, where Marco proposed, and attempts suicide with sleeping pills. Marco, unable to reach her, checks her social media posts and finds a clue to her location. He arrives just in time to prevent her overdose. Marco consoles Vivienne, promising never to forsake her and expressing his love for her as she is.

They visit a psychiatrist to help Vivienne with her depression. After her treatment, Vivienne posts a video online, stating that love is about accepting who she is. Marco proposes to her again, and she says yes. They share a kiss.

== Cast ==
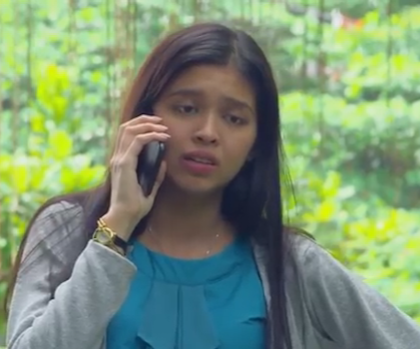
A film screenshot of Maine Mendoza as Vivienne

=== Main cast ===
- Alden Richards as Marco
- Maine Mendoza as Vivienne Castro

=== Supporting cast ===
- Nonie Buencamino as Roman
- Shamaine Buencamino as Aurora
- Dianne Medina as Lara
- Rodjun Cruz as John
- Marco Alcaraz as Miguel
- Precious Lara Quigaman as Angela
- Bing Pimentel as Marco's mother
- Marky Lopez as Edwin
- Shiela Marie Rodriguez as Ms. Mel
- Rhian Ramos as Chloe
- Prince Stefan as Vivienne's friend
