= Mowelfund =

Philippine non-governmental organization

- Formation: December 3, 1974
- Founder: Joseph Estrada
- Type: NGO
- Purpose: Support film industry workers
- Headquarters: Quezon City, Philippines
- Location(s): Mowelfund Plaza; No. 66 Rosario Drive corner Ilang-Ilang Street, Barangay Immaculate Conception, Cubao, Quezon City, Metro Manila, Philippines
- Coordinates: 14.62341°N 121.040237°E
- Chairperson: Boots Anson-Roa
- President & CEO: Rez Cortez
- Website: mowelfund.com

Movie Workers Welfare Foundation, Inc. (Mowelfund) is an organization in the Philippines that provides for the welfare of marginalized and undeserved workers in the film industry. As well as helping film workers in times of need, it provides support to various organizations including the Mowelfund Film Institute.

== History ==
The Movie Workers Welfare Foundation, Inc. (Mowelfund) was incorporated on December 3, 1974. It was established by then-San Juan Mayor and then-President of the Philippine Motion Picture Producers Association Joseph Estrada to fund the social welfare of workers in the Philippine film industry. It was incorporated The first members of the board of trustees consisted of Estrada, Jess Garcia, Jess Lee, and Rolfie Velasco.

They raised funds for the 1975 Metropolitan Film Festival, the Filipino Film Festival Tour in Canada and the United States, and the Supershow 76 at the Araneta Coliseum. The third event was the only one who managed to profit.

Mowelfund took over the organization of the Metro Manila Film Festival in 1978, after the controversial conduct of the 1977 edition.

In addition to supporting the welfare of movie industry workers, Mowelfund reorganized the Board of Censors to become the Movie and Television Review and Classification Board and created the Film Academy of the Philippines.

Mowelfund handled the Metro Manila Film Festival until the People Power Revolution in 1986, when the government assumed responsibility.

The old Mowelfund Plaza (c. 2016)

A groundbreaking ceremony was held for the proposed seven-storey Mowelfund Building Complex on December 21, 1990. Mowelfund moved to the building in 2001. However the completion of the building had delays with it being described as "half-finished" in 2007. In 2015, the seven-storey structure is noted to be underutilized.

In 2019, plans which has been seven years in the making for a new office was announced. A new six-storey building called the Mowelfund Center in Quezon City was inaugurated in July 2022.

== Activities ==
With about 4,500 members, Mowelfund provides financial support for hospitalization, surgery, medical fees and death benefits, and helps with housing and employment. The foundation maintains an archive of old Filipino movies. A museum was opened in 2005 in the Mowelfund headquarters, which are in a quiet part of Quezon City. The museum is run on a shoestring budget, and can be visited only through arrangement. Working with the Film Development Council of the Philippines, the Mowelfund Film Institute holds Intensive Filmmaking Workshops twice a year. These have helped many aspiring young Filipino filmmakers who are now active internationally. Mowelfund also campaigns against film and video piracy.

== Fundraising ==
In March 2011 Mowelfund celebrated its 37th anniversary at the Mowelfund Plaza in Quezon City. Former president and founder Joseph "Erap" Estrada was a guest of honor. The Philippine Charity Sweepstakes Office and the Mowelfund sweepstakes partnership were launched at the event. Through the partnership, Mowelfund beneficiaries could become dealers or agents of sweepstakes tickets, thus providing a livelihood. In June 2011 Mowelfund organized a fundraising concert at the Cultural Center of the Philippines to celebrate the 92nd anniversary of Dalagang Bukid, the first Filipino-produced film, which was directed by Jose Nepomuceno. Performers included Mitch Valdes, Dulce, Bituin Escalante, Jolina Magdangal and Janno Gibbs, supported by the Philippine Philharmonic Orchestra. In November 2011 Mowelfund held a celebrity bowling event in Eastwood Mall, Quezon City, to raise funds.
