= Wish I May (EP) =

EP by Alden Richards
- Released: October 17, 2015
- Recorded: August – September 2015
- Genre: Pop
- Language: English, Filipino
- Label: GMA

Alden Richards chronology
Alden Richards (2013)	Wish I May (2015)	Say It Again (2016)

Singles from Wish I May
- 1. "Wish I May" Released: September 2, 2015

Wish I May is the second extended play by Filipino actor and recording artist Alden Richards. It has 11 tracks and released under GMA Records on October 17, 2015. Upon the release of the album, it earned a gold record from PARI. It was launched at SM City North EDSA.

== Background ==
The album consists of three remakes and two original compositions. The album features several covers and two original compositions. The songs covered include "Thinking Out Loud" by Ed Sheeran and "God Gave Me You" by Bryan White, which are usually played in the Kalyeserye segment of Eat Bulaga! where Alden leads as the other half of AlDub.

=== Songs ===
"Wish I May" was released as the carrier single for the second studio album. The single landed on the number one spot in iTunes as the most downloaded song beating Justin Bieber's "What Do You Mean?" and Taylor Swift's "Wildest Dreams" after the day of its release. The music video of the song "Wish I May" was premiered on October 18, 2015, at the Sunday noontime variety show Sunday PinaSaya.

"Wish I May" was used for the television commercial for Datu Puti which features Richards and Maine Mendoza. The song also served as a theme song for the Philippine TV series Wish I May on GMA Network.

Richards' version of "Thinking Out Loud" was used as the opening theme song of the romantic comedy drama series That's My Amboy. Richards' rendition was also used as a soundtrack for God Gave Me You which was a part of Eat Bulaga!'s Lenten drama specials.

"Urong Sulong" was used as a soundtrack in the March 27, 2016, episode of the comedy anthology series Dear Uge.

== Release and marketing ==
The album was first announced on August 25, 2015, right after Richards finished recording the track "Wish I May", and he promoted it in various interviews and social media. Before the official launching at SM North EDSA Cinema, he performed "Thinking Out Loud" in the October 17, 2015, episode of Eat Bulaga! where he received his gold record award for the album and again a day after in Sunday PinaSaya. The mall tours for the record have started on the 23rd at Market! Market!. Several mall tours were also planned by GMA Records to promote the album.

== Commercial performance ==
On the day of its release, Wish I May reached the gold status from PARI 12 hours after it was released digitally. It is the fastest selling Filipino album in the Philippines in 2015, resulting to topping iTunes in the Philippines. The album received a platinum record award from PARI for selling more than 15,000 copies. In December, the album turned double platinum. The album earned a triple platinum award on January 21, 2016 and quadruple platinum award on February 28, 2016. In March 2015, the album received a 5× platinum record recognition from PARI. The album received the 6x and 7× platinum record awards on July 27, 2016 and the 8× platinum award on September 18, 2016. It received its diamond certification on October 9, 2016.

== Track listing ==
No.	Title	Writer(s)	Length
1.	"Wish I May"	Agat Obar-Morallos	3:36
2.	"Thinking Out Loud"	Ed Sheeran; Amy Wadge	5:36
3.	"God Gave Me You"	Andy Goldmark; Jamie Houston; James Dean Hicks	4:58
4.	"Urong Sulong"	JC Magsalin	4:15
5.	"How Great Is Our God"	Chris Tomlin; Jesse Reeves; Ed Cash	4:10
6.	"Wish I May" (instrumental)		3:36
7.	"Thinking Out Loud" (instrumental)		5:36
8.	"God Gave Me You" (instrumental)		4:58
9.	"Urong Sulong" (instrumental)		4:15
10.	"How Great Is Our God" (instrumental)		4:10
11.	"Wish I May" (acoustic)	Obar-Morallos	3:34

== Charts ==
Chart performance for Wish I May
Chart (2015)	Peak position
US Heatseekers – Pacific (Billboard)	8

== Certifications ==
=== Album ===
Certifications for Wish I May
Region	Certification	Certified units/sales
Philippines (PARI)	Diamond	150,000^{*}
^{*} Sales figures based on certification alone.

=== Single ===
Certifications for "Wish I May"
Region	Certification	Certified units/sales
Philippines (PARI)	Platinum	150,000^{*}
^{*} Sales figures based on certification alone.
