= Alakdana =

2011 Philippine television drama series

- Title card
- Also known as: Scorpion Lady
- Genre: Fantasy drama
- Written by: Dode Cruz; Kit Villanueva Langit; Luningning Ribay; Gen Delgado
- Directed by: Mac Alejandre
- Creative director: Jun Lana
- Starring: Louise delos Reyes
- Theme music composer: Vehnee Saturno
- Opening theme: "Sa Pangarap Ko" by Frencheska Farr
- Country of origin: Philippines
- Original language: Tagalog
- No. of episodes: 78

Production
- Executive producer: Joseph I. Aleta
- Editor: Robert Reyes
- Camera setup: Multiple-camera setup
- Running time: 19–29 minutes
- Production company: GMA Entertainment TV

Original release
- Network: GMA Network
- Release: January 24 – May 13, 2011

Alakdana (international title: The Lady Scorpion) is a 2011 Philippine television drama fantasy series broadcast by GMA Network. Directed by Mac Alejandre, it stars Louise delos Reyes in the title role. It premiered on January 24, 2011 on the network's Dramarama sa Hapon line up. The series concluded on May 13, 2011, with a total of 78 episodes.

The series is streaming online on YouTube.

== Cast and characters ==
Cast

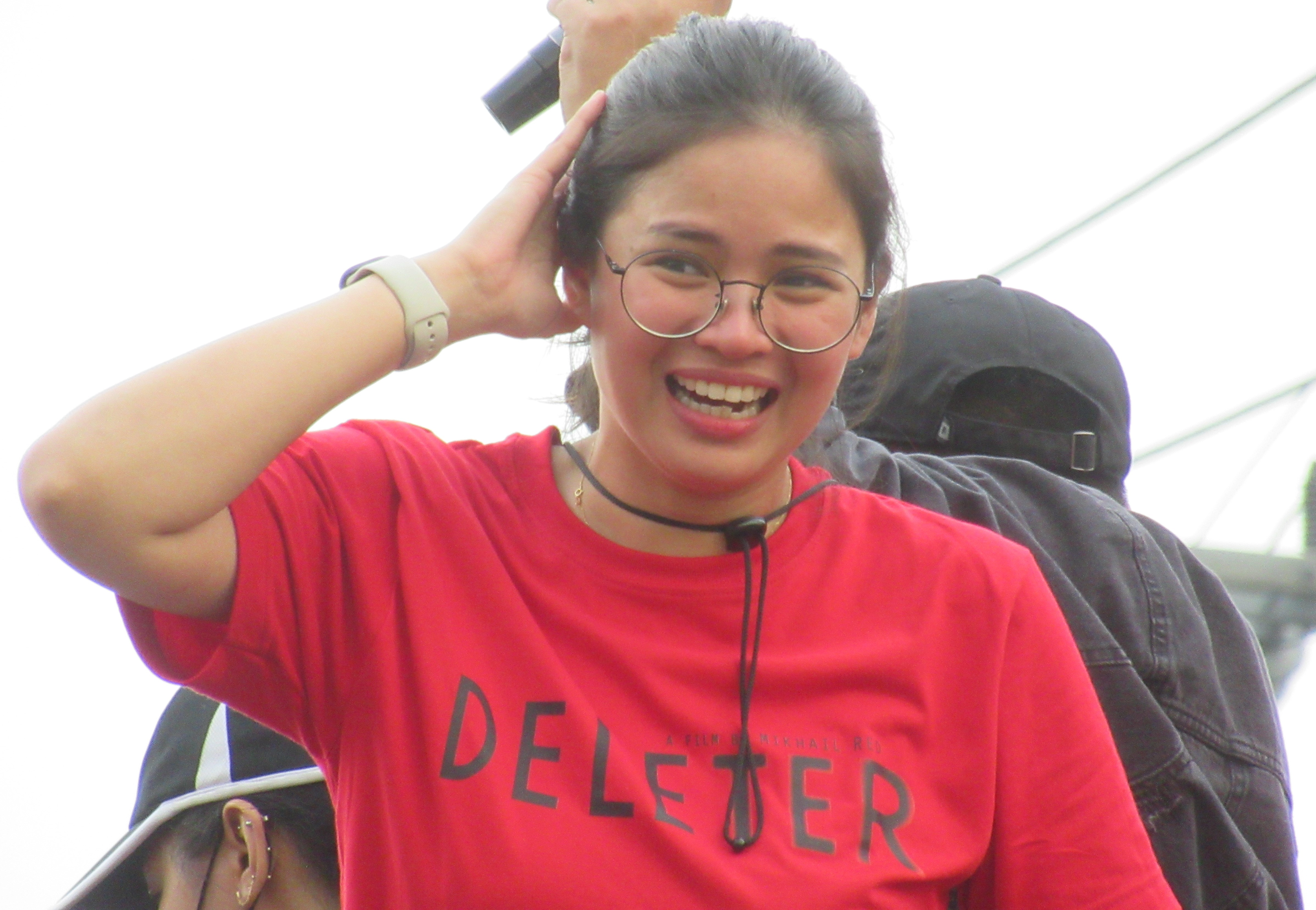
Louise delos Reyes

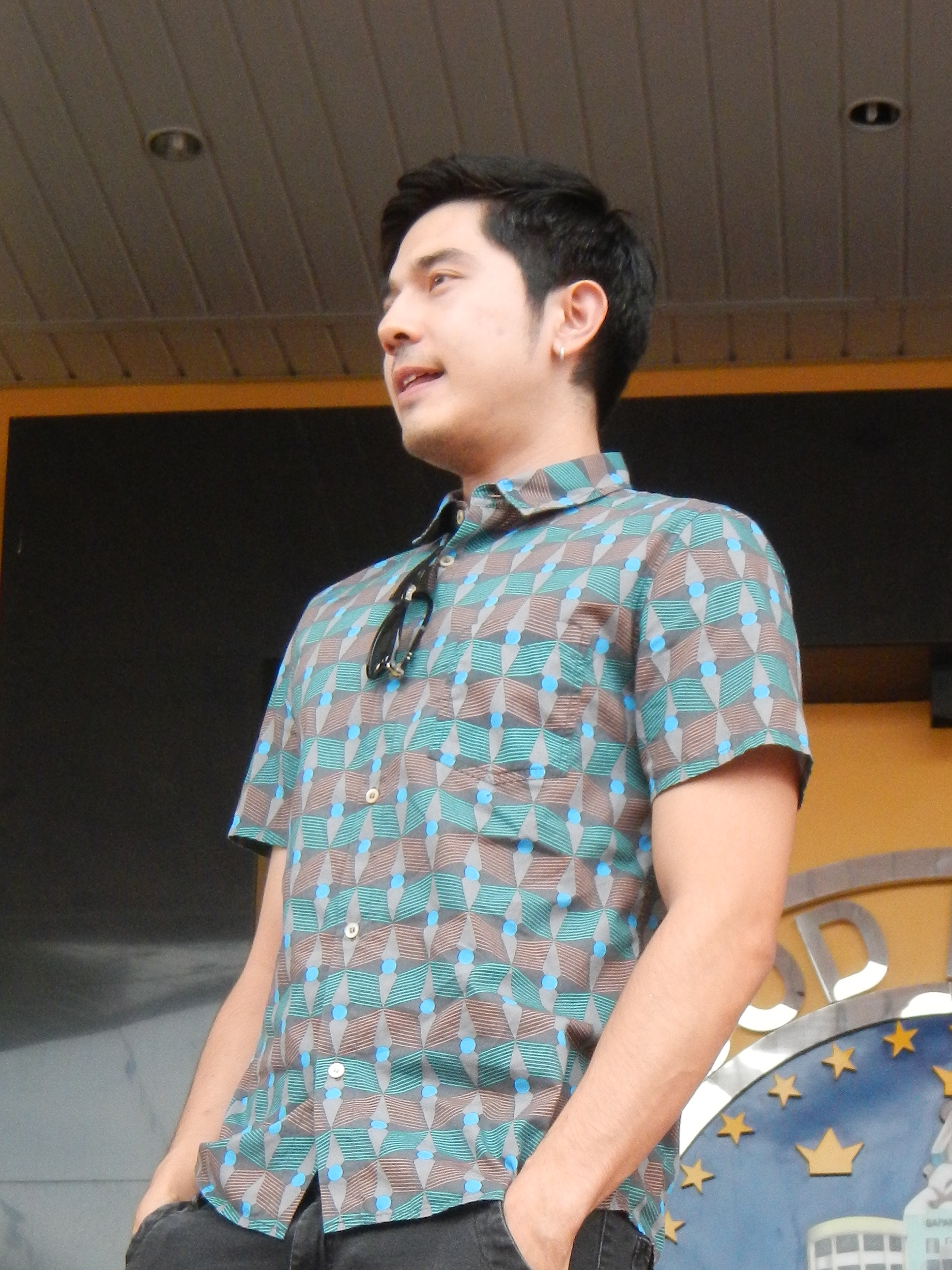
Paulo Avelino

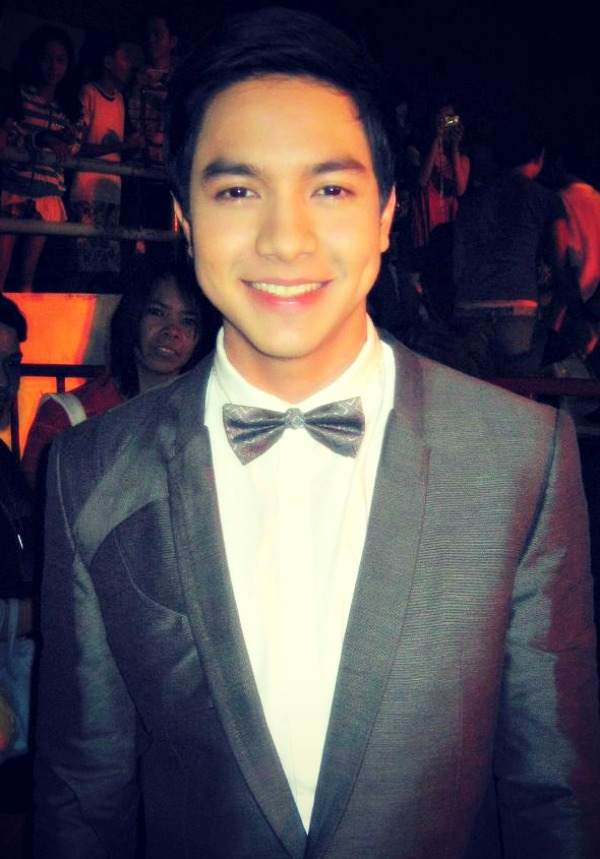
Alden Richards

Lead cast

- Louise delos Reyes as Adana San Miguel Madrigal

Supporting cast

- Paulo Avelino as Billy Yaneza
- Alden Richards as Jomari "Joma" Perez
- Jean Garcia as Teresa San Miguel
- Matthew Mendoza as Vergel Madrigal
- Jobelle Salvador as Zoila Madrigal
- Jhoana Marie Tan as Veronica Madrigal
- Ritchie Paul Gutierrez as Gabriel Geronimo
- Perla Bautista as Ising Perez
- Racquel Montesa as Olga Gaston
- Ian de Leon as Rico Romero
- Karla Estrada as Greta Yaneza
- Gwen Zamora as Rachel Dinagul / Krista Eisenhower
- Jan Manual as Vic
- Eunice Lagusad as Weng

Guest cast

- Mariel Pamintuan as younger Adana
- Randy Frosca as younger Joma
- Shermaine Santiago as Shiela Romero
- Menggie Cobarrubias as Vergel's father
- Baby O'Brien as Vergel's mother
- Carmen Soriano as Zoila's mother

== Ratings ==
According to AGB Nielsen Philippines' Mega Manila People/Individual television ratings, the pilot episode of Alakdana earned an 8.1% rating. The final episode scored a 16.6% rating in Mega Manila household television ratings.

== Accolades ==
Accolades received by Alakdana
| Year | Award | Category | Recipient | Result | Ref. |
|---|---|---|---|---|---|
| 2011 | Golden Screen TV Awards | Outstanding Breakthrough Performance by an Actor | Alden Richards | Won | |
| 2011 | 25th PMPC Star Awards for Television | Best Daytime Drama Series | Alakdana | Nominated | |
| 2011 | 25th PMPC Star Awards for Television | Best New Male TV Personality | Alden Richards | Nominated | |
