= Tamang Panahon =

2015 benefit concert and special episode by Eat Bulaga!

- Genre: Television special; Benefit concert
- Directed by: Poochie Rivera
- Presented by: Tito Sotto; Vic Sotto; Joey de Leon
- Starring: Alden Richards; Maine Mendoza; Wally Bayola; Paolo Ballesteros; Jose Manalo; Ryan Agoncillo; Michael V.; Allan K.; Jimmy Santos; Anjo Yllana; Ruby Rodriguez; Pauleen Luna; Julia Clarete; Sam YG; Patricia Tumulak; Ryzza Mae Dizon; Baste Granfon
- Country of origin: Philippines
- Original languages: Filipino; English

Production
- Executive producers: Helen Atienza-Dela Cruz; Dhory Maiquez; Sheila Macariola-Ilacad; Liza Marcelo-Lazatin
- Producer: Antonio P. Tuviera
- Production locations: Philippine Arena, Bocaue, Bulacan, Philippines
- Running time: 210 minutes
- Production company: TAPE Inc.

Original release
- Network: GMA Network
- Release: October 24, 2015

Tamang Panahon (lit. 'Right Time'; also known as Sa Tamang Panahon) is a benefit concert and a special episode of Eat Bulaga! that aired live on television in the Philippines and other countries on October 24, 2015, from the Philippine Arena. "Tamang Panahon" was part of the "Kalyeserye" portion of Eat Bulaga! and highlighted the no-restrictions (Note: In prior episodes of "Kalyeserye", the love team is only allowed to communicate through dubsmashing, flashing handwritten signs, and hand waves.) meeting of the love team of Alden Richards and Maine Mendoza, known as AlDub. The event experienced high demand immediately after the concert's announcement, with ticket sales amounting to ₱14 million. All of the proceeds went to the construction of libraries that benefited schools in the Philippines and the Lumad.

The commercial-free broadcast garnered high ratings in Mega Manila and nationally, according to multiple television measurement firms, and beat its competition—the 6th anniversary of It's Showtime—by a wide margin. The Twitter hashtag AlDubEBTamangPanahon was recognized by Guinness World Records as the most used hashtag in 24 hours. The hashtag generated a total of around 40.7 million tweets from October 24 to 25, 2015.

== "Kalyeserye" plot ==
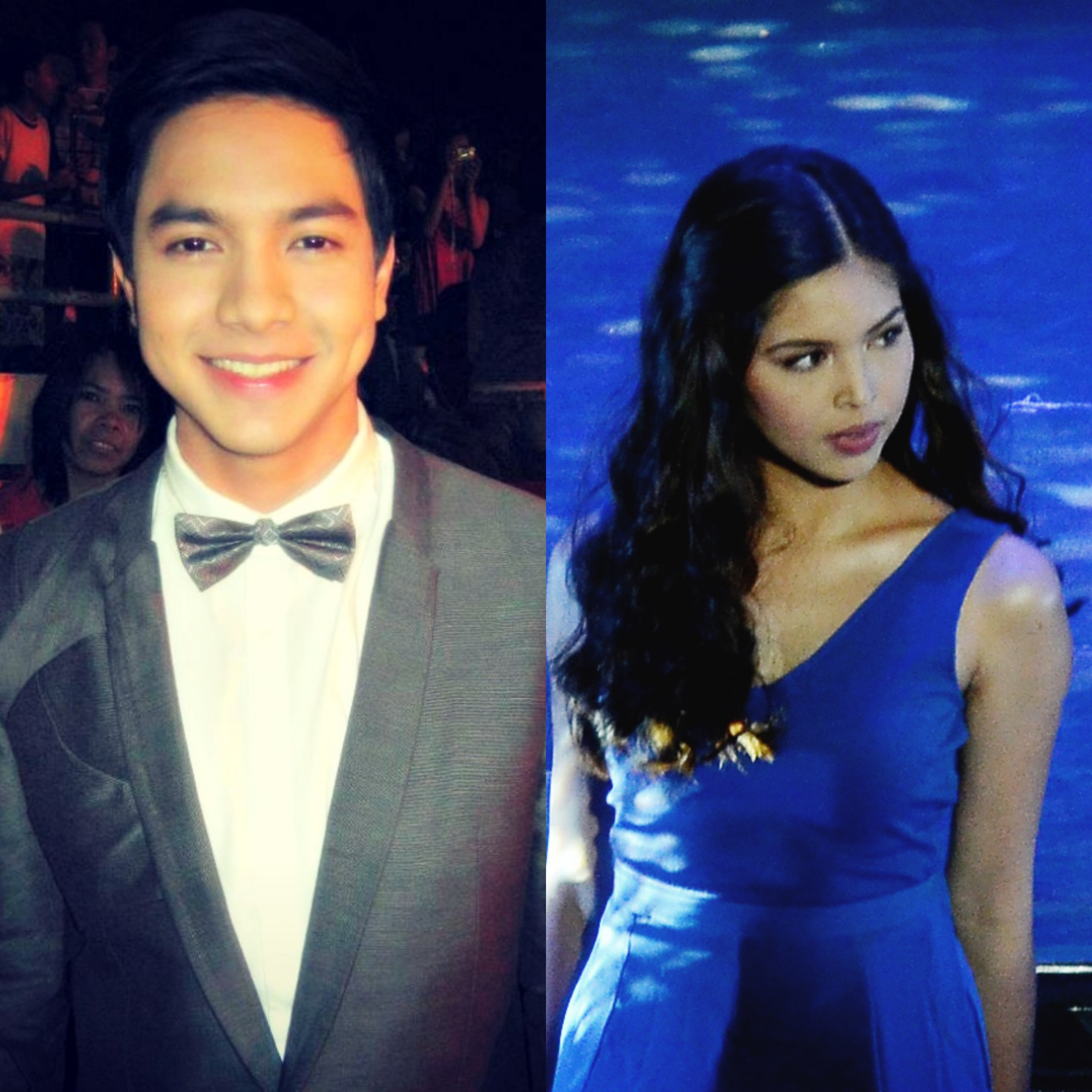
Alden Richards (left) and Maine Mendoza, known as Yaya Dub (right)

Lola Nidora (Wally Bayola) announces that she will allow a no-restrictions policy during meetings of Alden (Alden Richards) and Yaya Dub's (Maine Mendoza) meetings as long as they trust each other for the sake of love. After the announcement, Lola Nidora and her two other sisters—Lola Tidora (Paolo Ballesteros) and Lola Tinidora (Jose Manalo)—reminisce about their younger years. (Note: The younger versions of characters were portrayed by Pauleen Luna (Nidora), Patricia Tumulak (Tidora), and Julia Clarete (Tinidora).)

At the mansion of the three Lolas, Lola Nidora receives a mystery call warning her that the Riding in Tandem, who holds the secret diary, is heading to the bungalow (the Philippine Arena) to ruin the show. Meanwhile, Alden makes his way to the bungalow of Lola Nidora.

In the bungalow, Lola Nidora recollects her past relationships. She begins with Alberto, moving on to Antonio, then Ferdinand, (Note: The parody versions of Albert Einstein, Antonio Luna, and Ferdinand Magellan, respectively.) and finally Anselmo, whom Lola Nidora had carried away with him. However, her mother was not in favor of Anselmo, until she had met Miguel de Explorer, whom Lola Nidora loves. Lola Nidora continues her story by explaining the family tree of the de Explorer clan. Suddenly, DuhRizz arrives and says that she loves Alden but hates Yaya Dub. She later apologizes for her mistakes to them. Rihanna enters the scene and calls her chat mate Harry, but Lola Nidora orders Rihanna to fetch her and DuhRizz some juice. Lola Nidora tells DuhRizz that she can still find her true love, regardless of her social status, beauty, or educational background, and then calls Yaya Dub, who arrives along with Bae-by Baste and Yaya Luvs.

Alden finally arrives, bringing a box of roses and a box containing a missing glass slipper. (Note: This was the same slipper that Yaya Dub left after her first "Bulaga pa More! Dabarkads Pa More!" performance on August 12 of that same year.) Alden slowly enters and finally comes face-to-face with Yaya Dub. Lola Nidora enters the scene and lectures the couple about true love that waits for the right time and later proclaims that this is the right time for them. Then, the couple hugs Lola Nidora. Both Alden and Yaya Dub deliver their messages together. Lola Tidora and Lola Tinidora arrive and tell the couple to have their first dance together, but before their dance, Alden puts the missing slipper on the foot of Yaya Dub.

Afterward, the Riding in Tandem arrives on the scene, and Alden chases them to the car park. Suddenly, Frankie Arenolli arrives, wearing an outfit filled with logos of known sponsors of the event, while Yaya Dub and Alden run away. Frankie delivers a short speech and claims that Yaya Dub should have become his wife. As the show almost ends, Lola Tidora notices that Lola Nidora is missing. Lola Nidora and the Rogelios are at the car park, fighting off the Riding in Tandem, and Nidora successfully retrieves her secret diary from one of the riders.

== Production and airing ==
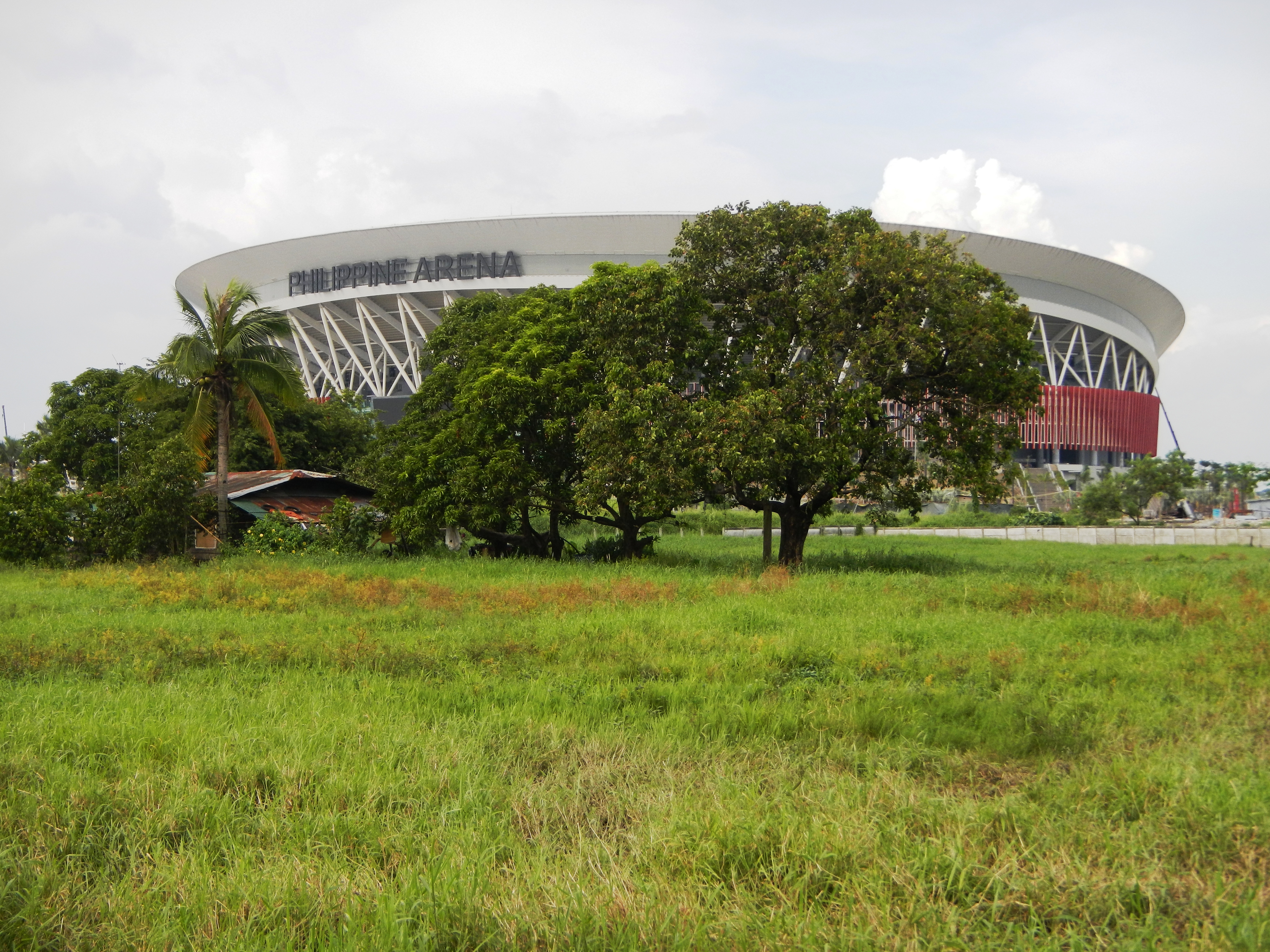
The show was held at the Philippine Arena in Bocaue, Bulacan, Philippines.

During the October 17, 2015, episode of "Kalyeserye", Wally Bayola through his Lola Nidora character announced that the AlDub love team would meet at the Philippine Arena with no restrictions on October 24, 2015. He further explained that the special event, which Lola Nidora called "Tamang Panahon", was for a cause and 100% of the ticket sales would go to the construction of AlDub libraries that would benefit three elementary schools.

In just minutes after the availability of the tickets for the "Tamang Panahon" or "Sa Tamang Panahon" event was announced, the website of the ticket provider, TicketWorld, crashed according to the posts of some netizens. Three hours later, TicketWorld said that ticket sales for the "Tamang Panahon" benefit concert broke records for first-day sales and the only available tickets were for the Level 4 prize zone. After three days, all tickets were sold out.

On October 24, 2015, attendees were allowed to enter the venue, the Philippine Arena, at 6 am. At 10 am, a pre-show began, including front act performances and other activities that were hosted by Valeen Montenegro and Jerald Napoles. At 11:30 am, "Tamang Panahon" was shown live via GMA Network in the Philippines and was also beamed live via satellite in other countries such as the United States, Canada, and New Zealand. The live broadcast lasted for about three and a half hours without any commercial breaks.

As with the rest of Eat Bulaga, "Tamang Panahon" was produced by TAPE Inc. with Antonio P. Tuviera as producer and Malou Choa-Fagar as the overall in-charge of production. It was directed by Poochie Rivera with all the regular crew and production team of Eat Bulaga! including Jenny Ferre as its creative head. This event was hosted by its regular hosts, including headliners Tito Sotto, Vic Sotto, and Joey de Leon as well as Ryan Agoncillo, Michael V., Allan K., Jimmy Santos, Anjo Yllana, Pauleen Luna, Julia Clarete, Sam YG, Patricia Tumulak, Jose Manalo, Wally Bayola, Paolo Ballesteros, Ryzza Mae Dizon, and Baste Granfon. Pia Guanio was absent due to a vacation leave.

== Performances ==
The show started as Wally Bayola's Lola Nidora character entered the premises of the Philippine Arena through a helicopter. After entering the venue, Lola Nidora and the Rogelios danced through the tune of Dawin's "Dessert". Lola Tidora performed songs from Mariah Carey and Regine Velasquez, while Lola Tinidora also danced to "Mambo No. 5" by Lou Bega.

The next dance number was performed by Pauleen Luna, Patricia Tumulak, and Julia Clarete. In their The Great Gatsby–inspired performance, they played the younger versions of Nidora, Tidora, and Tinidora. Later in the show, musical artists sang AlDub theme songs. Those singers were Raymund Sarangay of Silent Sanctuary, who sang "Sa 'Yo"; Medwin Marfil of True Faith, who sang "Dahil Ikaw", Jireh Lim, who sang "Buko"; Joey Generoso of Side A, who sang "Forevermore"; and Tito Sotto, Vic Sotto, and Joey de Leon, who sang "Ngiti", a Ronnie Liang original.

Before the highlight of the event, Maine Mendoza danced to Big Bang's "Fantastic Baby", which was followed by a dance number by Ryzza Mae Dizon and then another dance number by Baste who danced to Psy's "Gentleman". After a series of videos presenting Mendoza's rise to fame, Mendoza performed an instrumental dance to the tune of Selena's "Dreaming of You". Later on, the highlight of the event, the meeting of Alden Richards and Yaya Dub (the character of Maine Mendoza), followed as they performed Ed Sheeran's "Thinking Out Loud" and Bryan White's "God Gave Me You". Yaya Dub, who usually lip synced songs and film lines and did not actually speak in the previous episodes of the "Kalyeserye" segment, spoke for the first time in this event. At the end of the event, Alden and Yaya Dub danced together with other hosts of Eat Bulaga!

Aside from song and dance numbers, there were also "Kalyeserye" skits, which included Bayola switching between portrayals of his three characters: Lola Nidora, DuhRizz, and Rihanna. Frankie Arenolli, one of Jose Manalo's characters, performed a dance number at the end of the show where his outfit was filled with logos of advertisers. It served as product placement, in light of the lack of commercial breaks.

== Fundraising ==
"Tamang Panahon" is not only a special episode of Eat Bulaga! but also a benefit concert. The episode intended to raise funds for the construction of libraries that benefited schools and Lumad. All the ticket sales of the event were allotted to charity. Tickets were already sold out after three days of the announcement of its availability according to TicketWorld, the handler for selling the tickets of the event.

Other people who were not able to buy tickets still donated for the cause. After the first production number of the event, it was made public that the benefit show raised ₱14 million. Two months after the event was aired, some of the AlDub libraries were already fully constructed in the schools at Laguna, Capiz, and Iligan City. In October 2016, Maine Mendoza formally turned over one of the AlDub libraries to a beneficiary in Cebu.

== Reception ==
=== Ratings ===
"Tamang Panahon" was one of the most-watched television events of 2015 in the Philippines. Per AGB Nielsen's Nationwide Urban Television Audience Measurement, "Tamang Panahon" obtained a 50.8% rating in Mega Manila and 42.9% rating in urban areas in the Philippines, while Kantar Media reported a national rating of 40.1%. This compared with the sixth-anniversary special of It's Showtime that same day, which drew ratings of 5.4% in Mega Manila and 10.2% nationally. In Mega Manila, "Tamang Panahon" drew a higher audience share than the 2014 Manny Pacquiao vs. Timothy Bradley II fight and was the highest-rated daytime show episode of 2015.

=== Reactions ===
Some netizens criticized the gown worn by Maine Mendoza during the event, pointing out that it had already been worn by actress Kim Chiu previously. Liz Uy of Stylized Studio, who was hired as wardrobe stylist for the show, made a statement regarding the gown. She argued that the producers of Eat Bulaga!, TAPE Inc., purchased the gown from Francis Libiran and had chosen it to fit the Cinderella-themed event. Libiran stated that Chiu had worn the gown in a 2013 fashion show, that he had made replicas for other, lower-profile clients, and that Mendoza's was custom-tailored for her.

Kim Chiu appealed through Twitter to stop the hate, stating that the "gown is just a gown". Eat Bulaga! host Allan K. also asked on Twitter not to make an issue of the gown, since Libiran had already released a statement on its history.

== Accolades and features ==
According to the Guinness World Records, the "Tamang Panahon" hashtag #AlDubEBTamangPanahon became the most used hashtag in 24 hours on Twitter, generating 40,706,392 mentions from October 24 to 25, 2015. The recognition was part of the record-breaking feats of Twitter's 10-year history. The most retweeted tweet for the event came from a post from the official Twitter account of Maine Mendoza, which was retweeted more than 74,000 times.

"Tamang Panahon" received a special award during the 2016 Box Office Entertainment Awards as the Highest Record Rating of a Noontime Show of All Time (Local & Global). The event was also featured in a special collectors' edition of the December 2015 issue of Yes! magazine.
