= Pabebe wave =

2015 hand gesture by Alden Richards and Maine Mendoza

Alden Richards and Maine Mendoza doing the pabebe wave.

Pabebe wave is a cringe term coined by the Philippine media to describe a gesture where a person imitates the waving movement done by beauty contestants in the Miss Universe pageant. It was popularized by AlDub in the "Juan For All, All for Juan" segment of the Philippine noontime show Eat Bulaga! A deviation from a beauty-queen wave gesture, it was exchanged between Alden Richards and Maine Mendoza after its initiation by the latter's character, Yaya Dub. Now popular among Filipinos, it also caught the attention of the world through several media platforms. The gesture is similar to an earlier British gesture – the royal wave, used to mock the waving of the royal family.

== History ==
On July 16, 2015, while doing a Dubsmash-inspired bit on the noontime variety show Eat Bulaga!, Yaya Dub caught Richards' attention, which prompted Yaya Dub to let out a smile that she failed to conceal and that was so out of her character as an uptight "Yaya" (Nanny). Amid teasing from the show's hosts Tito Sotto, Joey de Leon, Vic Sotto, and especially Allan K—Yaya Dub made a playful hand motion in reciprocation to Richards' greeting. Referred thereafter as the "pabebe wave," it is derived from the Filipino slang, pabebe, which means "to act cute like a baby." The gesture is made when a hand is curved slightly inwards, with all fingers closed together, in a small side-to-side motion. The gesture was so intriguing that it caught on and was soon imitated by the show's audience.

== Social and cultural impact ==
After its introduction, the "pabebe wave" quickly spread and is often used as a gesture of friendly greeting by viewers and non-viewers of the show alike, including local celebrities, politicians, including staff at the US embassy in the Philippines. The trend also went viral online that various international celebrities are shown to be doing the wave, including Vin Diesel, Lifehouse, and Bryan White. Because of the pabebe wave's popularity, international entertainment and news outlets, such as BBC News and The Guardian, even feature the Filipino craze on their programs.

Eat Bulaga! declared September 26, 2015 as the "National Pabebe Wave Day," an event where thousands of Filipinos all over the world joined to do the gesture.

== See also ==
- Korean wave
- Tamang Panahon
