= Speech Graphics =

Scottish technology company

- Type: Private
- Industry: Computer animation; Artificial intelligence software
- Founded: 2010; 16 years ago in Edinburgh, Scotland
- Founders: Michael Berger, Gregor Hofer
- Headquarters: Edinburgh, Scotland, United Kingdom
- Key people: Gregor Hofer (CEO); Michael Berger (CTO)
- Products: SGX, SG Com, Rapport, FaceFX
- Number of employees: ~60 (2025)
- Website: www.speech-graphics.com

Speech Graphics is a Scottish technology company that creates facial animation software, generating lip sync and emotional expressions from audio. Its technology is used in applications including AAA game development, VR avatars, and AI assistants.

== History ==
Speech Graphics was founded in 2010 as a spin-out from the University of Edinburgh, by Michael Berger and Gregor Hofer to commercialise their audio-driven facial animation technology.

The company started out as a consulting business while developing the technology further. Games such as Shadow of Mordor made use of Speech Graphics services. A music video for Kanye West, "Black Skinhead" (2013), used its technology for computer-generated imagery. In 2016, Gears of War 4 used Speech Graphics products during development. The company transitioned to selling software as a service in about 2017.

It raised a first venture capital round in 2018 and a Series A round by Sands Capital in 2022 to launch its enterprise cloud platform Rapport.

In 2023 the technology was used by researchers at UC San Francisco and UC Berkeley in a brain–computer interface study, enabling a person with severe paralysis to communicate via a digital avatar.

Aquifer Motion became a part of Speech Graphics when the company acquired it in 2025.

FaceFX became part of the Speech Graphics product line up in 2025 when the company acquired the assets of OC3 Entertainment.

== Technology and products ==
Speech Graphics technology analyses speech and generates the matching lip sync and emotional expressions automatically. The company sells the following products:

- SGX is a set of tools for producing facial animation from audio files. It has batch processing and editing capabilities, character configuration editing, and multiple integrations.
- SG Com provides access to real-time audio-driven facial animation technology, which helps developers build interactive applications with avatars based on voice audio.
- Rapport is a platform for real-time interactive avatars aimed at enterprise with applications in training and education.
- FaceFX toolset was acquired with OC3 Entertainment in 2025.

Speech Graphics technology has been used in video games including Shadow of Mordor, The Last of Us Part II, Hogwarts Legacy and Monster Hunter Wilds.
