= Lip sync =

Matching lip movements to a recording

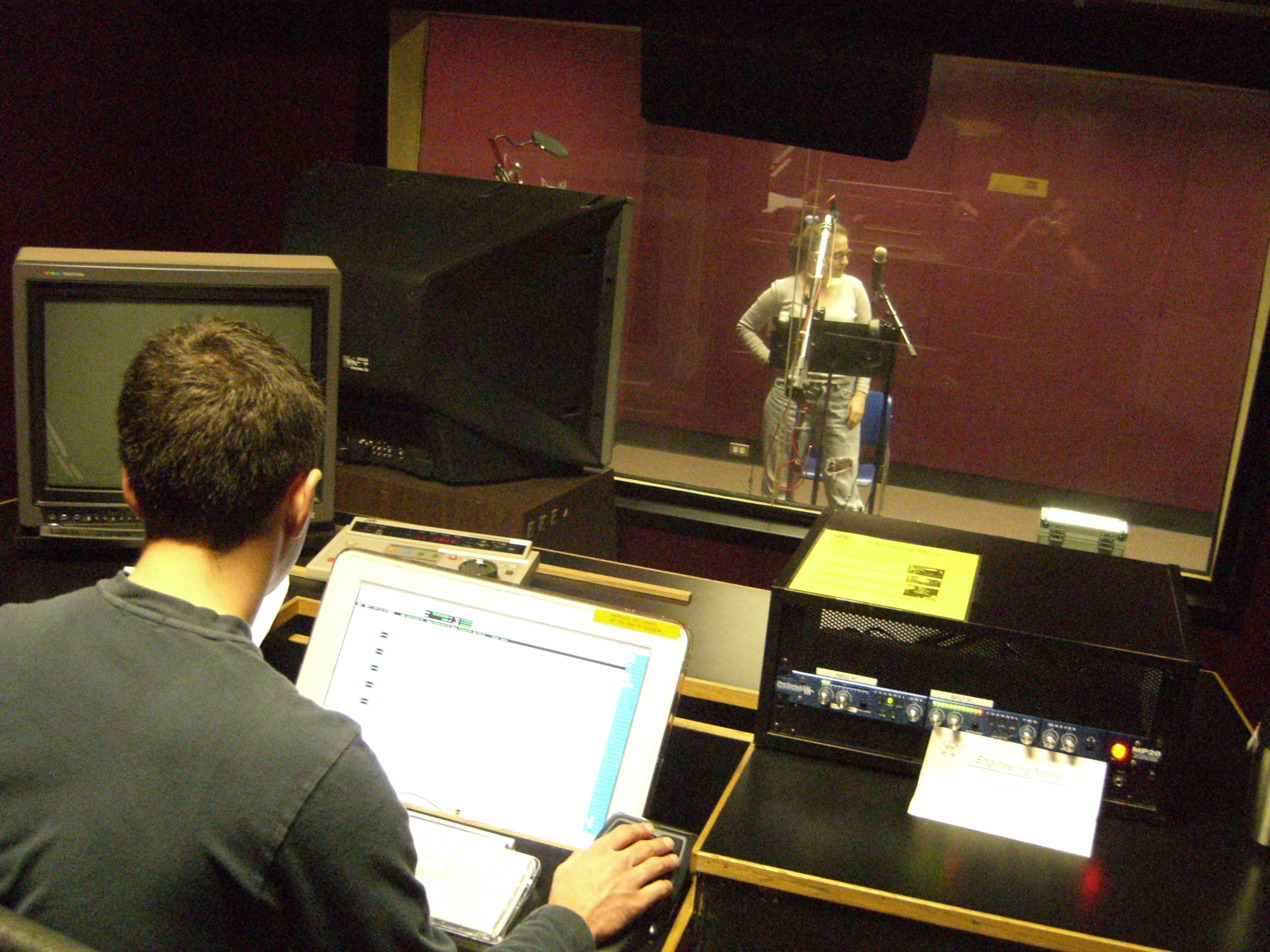
An audio engineer (foreground) recording a voice actor (at microphone) for an animated video production. Lip synchronization of this recording with animation will give the impression that an animated character is speaking.

Lip sync or lip synch (pronounced /sɪŋk/, like the word sink, despite the spelling of the participial forms synced and syncing), short for lip synchronization, is a technical term for matching a speaking or singing person's lip movements with sung or spoken vocals.

Audio for lip syncing is generated through the sound reinforcement system in a live performance or via television, computer, cinema speakers, or other forms of audio output. The term can refer to any of a number of different techniques and processes, in the context of live performances and audiovisual recordings.

In film production, lip syncing is often part of the post-production phase. Dubbing foreign-language films and making animated characters appear to speak both require elaborate lip syncing. Many video games make extensive use of lip-synced sound files to create an immersive environment in which on-screen characters appear to be speaking. In the music industry, lip syncing is used by singers for music videos, television and film appearances, and some types of live performances. Lip syncing by singers can be controversial to fans attending concert performances who expect a live performance.

== In music ==
Lip sync is considered a form of miming. It can be used to make it appear as though actors have substantial singing ability (e.g., The Partridge Family television show), to simulate a vocal effect that can be achieved only in the recording studio (e.g., Cher's Believe, which used an Auto-Tune effects processing on her voice); to improve performance during choreographed live dance numbers that incorporate vocals; to misattribute vocals entirely (e.g., Milli Vanilli, a band which lip synced to recordings made by other singers), or to cover deficiencies in live performance. It is also commonly used in drag shows. Sometimes lip sync performances are forced on performers by television producers to shorten the guest appearances of celebrities, as it requires less time for rehearsals and hugely simplifies the process of sound mixing, or to eliminate the risk of vocal errors. Some artists lip sync because they are not confident singing live and want to avoid singing out of tune.

Because the film track and music track are recorded separately during the creation of a music video, artists usually lip sync their songs and often imitate playing musical instruments as well. Artists also sometimes move their lips at a faster speed than the recorded track, to create videos with a slow-motion effect in the final clip, which is widely considered to be complex to achieve. Similarly, some artists have been known to lip sync backward for music videos such that, when reversed, the singer is seen to sing forwards while time appears to move backwards in his or her surroundings, such as in Coldplay's "The Scientist". Notable exceptions to this trend include Bruce Springsteen's hit "Streets of Philadelphia", which only uses the instruments as a backing track while the vocals were recorded with a microphone attached on the singer, giving a different feel to it.

On American Bandstand and most variety shows of the 1960s, vocals and instrumentals were all (with a few notable exceptions on American Bandstand) synced to pre-recorded music. Since the creation of MTV in the 1980s, many artists have focused on visual effects, rather than singing, for their live shows. Artists often lip sync during strenuous dance numbers in both live and recorded performances.

=== Complex performance ===
Artists often lip sync during strenuous dance numbers in both live and recorded performances, due to lung capacity being needed for physical activity (both at once would require incredibly trained lungs). Michael Jackson is an example of this; he performed complex dance routines while lip syncing and live singing. His performance on the television special Motown 25: Yesterday, Today, Forever (1983) changed the scope of live stage show. Ian Inglis, author of Performance and Popular Music: History, Place and Time (2006) notes the fact that "Jackson lip-synced 'Billie Jean' is, in itself, not extraordinary, but the fact that it did not change the impact of the performance is extraordinary; whether the performance was live or lip synced made no difference to the audience," thus creating an era in which artists recreate the spectacle of music video imagery on stage.

Chris Nelson of The New York Times reported: "Artists like Madonna and Janet Jackson set new standards for showmanship, with concerts that included not only elaborate costumes and precision-timed pyrotechnics but also highly athletic dancing. These effects came at the expense of live singing." Edna Gundersen of USA Today comments that the complexity of modern stage show has forced "singing and musicianship into minor roles", citing as example artists such as New Kids on the Block, Milli Vanilli, George Michael, Cher, Paula Abdul and Janet Jackson. Gundersen elaborates: "The most obvious example is Madonna's Blond Ambition World Tour, a visually preoccupied and heavily choreographed spectacle. Madonna lip-syncs the duet 'Now I'm Following You', while a Dick Tracy character mouths Warren Beatty's recorded vocals. On other songs, background singers plump up her voice, strained by the exertion of non-stop dancing."

=== Changing fan expectations ===
Billboard editor Thom Duffy commented in 1990: "The expectations of fans have changed, and that's the driving force here ... They expect a concert as perfect as what they see on MTV." Rashod D. Ollison of The Baltimore Sun observed in 2004: "Since the advent of MTV and other video music channels, pop audiences have been fed elaborate videos thick with jaw-dropping effects, awesome choreography, fabulous clothes, marvelous bodies. And the same level of perfection is expected to extend beyond the video set to the concert stage. So if Britney Spears, Janet Jackson or Madonna sounds shrill and flat without a backing track, fans won't pay up to $300 for a concert ticket."

Lip syncing can also be part of an artist's performance style. A 2014 study of Japanese electropop acts Perfume and Kyary Pamyu Pamyu links lip syncing to their personas, vocals, dance and costumes.

=== Using real singing and some lip syncing ===
Some singers habitually lip sync during live performances, both concert and televised, over pre-recorded music and mimed backing vocals; this is known as singing over playback. Some artists switch between live singing and lip syncing during a performance, particularly during songs that require them to hit particularly high or low notes. Lip syncing these notes ensures that the performer will not be out of tune or strain their voice. Once the difficult portion of the song has passed, the artist may continue to lip sync or may resume singing live. Some artists lip sync choruses during songs but sing the main verses.

=== Musical theater ===
The practice of syncing also occurs in musical theater, for much the same purpose as for musicians. A production may include a mix of lip synced and live musical numbers. In long-running shows, this may be done to help protect the performer's voice from strain and damage, as well as to maintain a high caliber of production. A notable example of using lip syncing as a special effect includes performances of The Phantom of the Opera, with swing actors in the same costumes as the lead actors give the illusion of the characters moving around the stage with some mystery.

=== Parade floats ===
Artists may also lip sync in situations in which their backup bands and sound reinforcement systems cannot be accommodated, such as the Macy's Thanksgiving Day Parade, which features popular singers lip syncing while riding floats.

=== Types ===
"[S]ome of the most talented singers have been caught in the act of lip-synching". Arts journalist Chuck Taylor says that it is considered "an egregious offense", but he points out that when singers are dancing and doing complex stage shows, it is hard to sing live. On some TV show performances, "the singer's microphone is still on. On the parts they're not confident on or if the performance is physically demanding, the artist will sing quieter, and more of the performance [backing] track vocals can be heard." There are "very few artists who [...] completely lip-sync" while a backing track is playing with "full lead vocals", a practice done due to "weather conditions, technical issues, or sickness."

=== For entertainment and effect ===
Lip syncing where the audience knows the performer is pretending has also been popular as a form of musical pantomime, in which performers mime to pre-recorded music for the public's entertainment. It is often performed by drag performers (drag queens and drag kings). Iron Maiden and Muse both mocked demands by two music television programs to give mimed performances, by having their band members deliberately swap instruments.

Examples of lip sync performances (sometimes referred to as a lip dub video) have also been popular as viral videos on the internet. An early example, "Numa Numa", a video recorded by Gary Brolsma of him dancing and lip syncing to the song "Dragostea din Tei", was ranked in 2007 by The Viral Factory as the second most-viewed viral video of all time behind the Star Wars Kid.

Various television competition programs have been built around lip sync performances, such as Puttin' on the Hits, and Lip Service. Comedian Jimmy Fallon incorporated similar performances with celebrities as sketches during his late night talk show Late Night with Jimmy Fallon; he oversaw a standalone television series for Spike, Lip Sync Battle, which extended the concept into a competitive format between pairs of celebrities. Owing to their prominence as part of drag culture, the reality competition franchise RuPaul's Drag Race uses lip sync performances as a recurring challenge, particularly to eliminate contestants.

Mobile apps such as Dubsmash and TikTok (which acquired and shut down Musical.ly in 2017), which allow users to record their own lip sync videos to pre-existing audio and song clips for sharing on social networking services or an internal platform, have also been popular.

In 2015, Maine Mendoza — a Filipino content creator who had been nicknamed the "Queen of Dubsmash" — became a cast member of the Filipino variety show Eat Bulaga! She appeared in a recurring sketch as a character named Yaya Dub, whose dialogue consisted exclusively of lip synced audio. Her spontaneous reactions to fellow cast member Alden Richards during a remote broadcast resulted in the creation of an on-air couple known as AlDub, in which the two were portrayed as a couple who never physically meet, and communicated solely via lip syncing. The couple became a major cultural phenomenon in the country, and appeared on-stage for the first time in an October 2015 concert special, Tamang Panahon. A hashtag associated with the special received 41 million posts within 24 hours on Twitter, beating a global record previously set during Brazil and Germany's semi-final match at the 2014 FIFA World Cup.

=== Legal and ethical aspects ===
In the Australian state of New South Wales, the government is considering new laws that would require pop singers to print disclaimers on tickets "to alert fans if [the singers] intend on miming throughout their shows". Fair Trading Minister Virginia Judge stated that "Let's be clear – live means live." Minister Judge stated that "If you are spending up to $200 [on concert tickets], I think you deserve better than a film clip". She indicated that "The NSW Government would be happy to look at options, such as a disclaimer on a ticket which would warn consumers a performance is completely pre-recorded."

A writer on ethics calls lip syncing an "affront to all legitimate live performers who risk lyric mistakes and cracking voices to give an authentic performance". The author argues that lip syncing in live concerts will "...destroy our ability to enjoy great live performances the way we once could, thrilling to the certain knowledge that we are witnessing something extraordinary from a great talent". The author argues that this "...makes lip-syncing in public performances wrong. Not only is the audience being lied to; it is being made cynical".

=== Examples ===
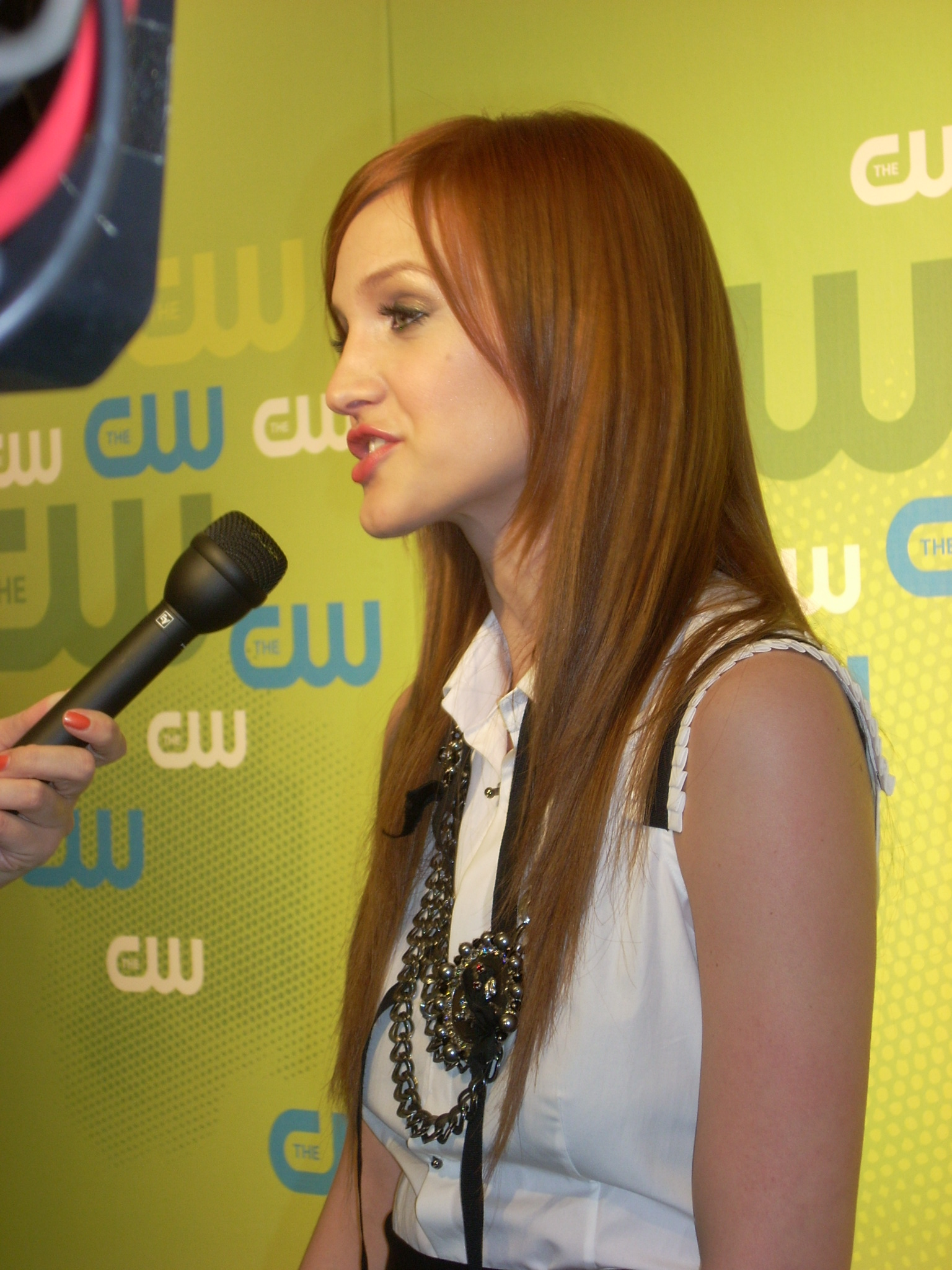
Pop singer Ashlee Simpson (pictured in 2009) lip-synced a song on the variety TV show Saturday Night Live in 2004.

While Michael Jackson's performance on the television special Motown 25: Yesterday, Today, Forever (1983) changed the scope of live stage show, as he mixed singing and complex dance moves, Ian Inglis, author of Performance and Popular Music: History, Place and Time (2006) states that "Jackson lip-synced 'Billie Jean'" during this TV show. In 1989, a New York Times article claimed that "Bananarama's recent concert at the Palladium", the "first song had a big beat, layered vocal harmonies and a dance move for every line of lyrics", but "the drum kit was untouched until five songs into the set, or that the backup vocals (and, it seemed, some of the lead vocals as well-a hybrid lead performance) were on tape along with the beat". The article also claims that "British band Depeche Mode, ...adds vocals and a few keyboard lines to [a] taped backup [track when they perform] onstage".

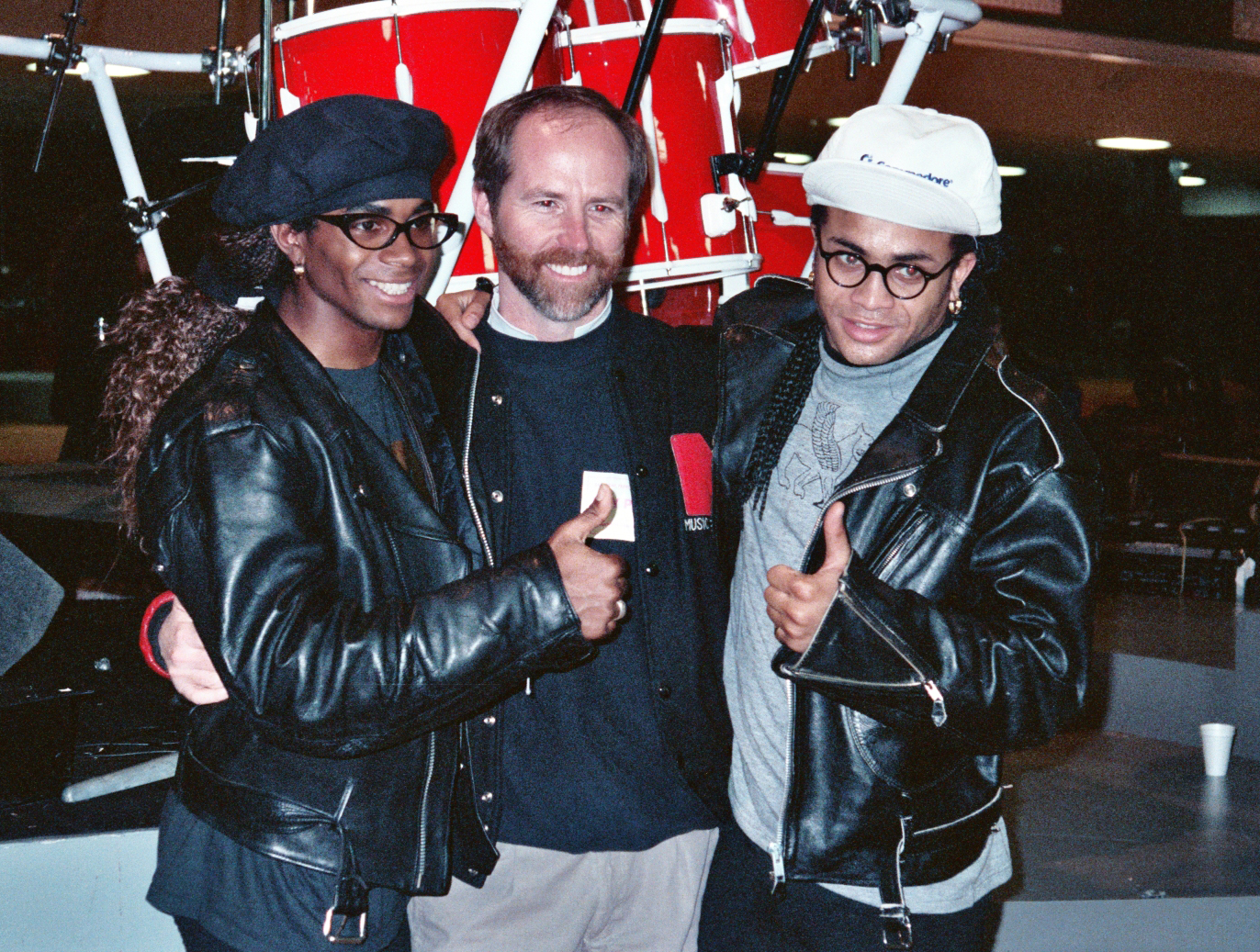
Milli Vanilli in 1990

In 1989, during a Milli Vanilli performance recorded by MTV at the Lake Compounce theme park in Bristol, Connecticut, what sounded to be a pre-recorded track of the group's song "Girl You Know It's True" jammed and began to skip, repeating the partial line "Girl, you know it's..." over and over. Due to rising public questions regarding the source of singing talent in the group, owner Frank Farian confessed to reporters on November 12, 1990, that Morvan and Pilatus did not actually sing on the records. As a result of American media pressure, Milli Vanilli's Grammy was withdrawn four days later, and Arista Records dropped the act from its roster and deleted their album and its masters from their catalog, taking the album Girl You Know It's True out of print in the process. After these details emerged, at least 26 different lawsuits were filed under various U.S. consumer fraud protection laws. On August 28, a settlement was approved that refunded those who attended concerts along with those who bought Milli Vanilli recordings. An estimated 10 million buyers were eligible to claim a refund.

Chris Nelson of The New York Times reported that by the 1990s, "[a]rtists like Madonna and Janet Jackson set new standards for showmanship, with concerts that included not only elaborate costumes and precision-timed pyrotechnics but also highly athletic dancing. These effects came at the expense of live singing." Edna Gundersen of USA Today reported: "The most obvious example is Madonna's Blond Ambition World Tour, a visually preoccupied and heavily choreographed spectacle. Madonna lip syncs the duet 'Now I'm Following You', while a Dick Tracy character mouths Warren Beatty's recorded vocals. On other songs, background singers plump up her voice, strained by the exertion of non-stop dancing."

Similarly, in reviewing Janet Jackson's Rhythm Nation World Tour, Michael MacCambridge of the Austin American-Statesman commented "[i]t seemed unlikely that anyone—even a prized member of the First Family of Soul Music—could dance like she did for 90 minutes and still provide the sort of powerful vocals that the '90s super concerts are expected to achieve."

The music video for Electrasy's 1998 single "Morning Afterglow" featured lead singer Alisdair McKinnell lip syncing the entire song backwards. This allowed the video to create the effect of an apartment being tidied by 'un-knocking over' bookcases, while the music plays forwards.

On October 23, 2004, US pop singer Ashlee Simpson appeared as a musical guest of episode 568 of the live comedy TV show Saturday Night Live. During her performance, "she was revealed to apparently be lip-synching". According to "her manager-father[,]...his daughter needed the help because acid reflux disease had made her voice hoarse." Her manager stated that "Just like any artist in America, she has a backing track that she pushes so you don't have to hear her croak through a song on national television." During the incident, vocal parts from a previously performed song began to sound while the singer was "holding her microphone at her waist"; she made "some exaggerated hopping dance moves, then walked off the stage".

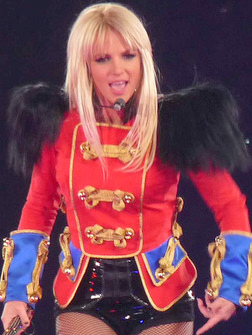
Spears performing in 2009's world tour The Circus Starring Britney Spears

In 2009, US pop singer Britney Spears was "'extremely upset' over the savaging she has received after lip-synching at her Australian shows", where ABC News (Australia) reported that "[d]isappointed fans ...stormed out of Perth's Burswood Dome after only a few songs". Reuters reports that Britney Spears "is, and always has been, about blatant, unapologetic lip-synching". The article claims that "at the New York stop of her anticipated comeback tour, Spears used her actual vocal cords only three times – twice to thank the crowd, and once to sing a ballad (though the vocals during that number were questionable, as well)". Rolling Stone magazine stated that "Though some reports indicate Spears did some live singing [in her 2009 concerts], the L.A. Times Ann Powers notes that the show was dominated by backing tracks (which granted, is not the same thing as miming)".

Teenage viral video star Keenan Cahill openly lip syncs popular songs on his YouTube channel. His popularity has increased as he included guests such as rapper 50 Cent in November 2010 and David Guetta in January 2011, sending him to be one of the most popular channels on YouTube in January 2011.

The Beatles ran afoul of the contemporaneous British law against miming on television in 1967 with their lip synced promo clip to their song Hello, Goodbye. On the 21 November 1967 edition of Top of the Pops, the song was thus played over a series of sequences from the band's 1964 film A Hard Day's Night. On the 7 December edition of the show, a specially made Black and white promo clip was broadcast with the song, which consisted of the band members editing their telefilm Magical Mystery Tour, and (other than the official promo clip in color including miming, which first became commercially available with the 1996 VHS release of The Beatles Anthology) was not released on home video up until appearing as a bonus feature on the 2012 DVD release of Magical Mystery Tour.

Indian cinema relies heavily on lip syncing. Lip syncing by a playback singer is almost exclusively used in Indian cinema, where actors perform song and dance sequences in movies while lip syncing to the song that is sung by playback singers. The playback singers are officially recognised and have gained much fame in their careers. Some notables among them are Lata Mangeshkar, Kishore Kumar, Muhammad Rafi, Asha Bhosle, Sonu Nigam, Shreya Ghoshal, and many more.

- Gene Pitney was involved in a memorable gaffe on ITV's This Morning in 1989, owing to a "technical mishap". Giving an ostensibly live performance of his track "You're the Reason", Pitney missed his cue and was seen "failing dismally to mime along in time to his backing track"; he tried not to laugh and continued with the song. The incident has been repeated on television over the years, notably on a 2002 episode of BBC One series Room 101, where host Paul Merton described it as a "very funny moment" in which Pitney came in "unbearably late". It was re-aired on the 25th-anniversary edition of This Morning in 2013, where presenter Holly Willoughby "broke out into a cold sweat" while reliving the moment.
- 50 Cent was caught lip syncing live on stage at the BET awards, watched by millions of people when DJ Whoo Kidd played the instrumental version of the hit song "Amusement Park".
- During a concert at Madison Square Garden, the R & B singer R. Kelly put down his microphone in the middle of a song and let his recorded vocals keep singing.
- The Pittsburgh Post-Gazette called Janet Jackson "one of pop's most notorious onstage lip synchers" in a 2001 article on lip syncing.

In an article about Katy Perry, entitled "Lip-Sync Malfunction Forces Katy Perry to Use Her Own Voice to Sing", Gawker stated that while the pop star was "performing her hit song 'Roar' at the NRJ Music Awards in Cannes on Saturday, [she] suffered a devastating lip-sync malfunction." Perry was "unable to match the backing track" with her lip movements, causing the host to stop the performance and ask her if she wished to start again. Perry restarted the song, this time without the backing track. The producers issued a statement indicating that it was planned for Perry to sing live, except that a "technical problem" caused staff to play a "bad soundtrack".

==== Recurring events ====
The Super Bowl has used lip syncing during singers' performances at the live-to-air sports event. During Super Bowl XLIII, "Jennifer Hudson's performance of the national anthem" was "lip-synched ...to a previously recorded track, and apparently so did Faith Hill who performed before her". The singers lip synced "...at the request of Rickey Minor, the pregame show producer", who argued that "There's too many variables to go live." Subsequent Super Bowl national anthems were performed live. Whitney Houston's rendition of the anthem at the 1991 Super Bowl was also reported to have been lip synced. Such pre-recorded performances for the Super Bowl's halftime shows and national anthem have been commonplace since the 1990s; the NFL has confirmed this as standard practice. In January 1998, singer-songwriter Jewel was criticised for lip syncing the American national anthem at the opening of the Super Bowl XXXII to a digitally recorded track of her own voice. This was noticeable as the singer missed her cue, and thus, did not sing the first few words of the song. Super Bowl producers have since admitted that they attempt to have all performers pre-record their vocals.

Some Olympics events have used lip syncing. In the 2008 Summer Olympics opening ceremony, the song "Ode to the Motherland" appeared to be sung by Lin Miaoke at the ceremony, but it emerged that she mimed her performance to a recording by another girl, Yang Peiyi, who actually won the audition. It was a last-minute decision to use lip syncing, following a Politburo member's objection to Yang's physical appearance. International Olympic Committee executive director Gilbert Felli defended the use of a more photogenic double.

On February 10, 2006, Luciano Pavarotti appeared during a performance of the opera aria "Nessun Dorma" at the 2006 Winter Olympics opening ceremony in Turin, Italy, at his final performance. In the last act of the opening ceremony, his performance received the longest and loudest ovation of the night from the international crowd. Leone Magiera, the conductor who directed the performance, revealed in his 2008 memoirs, Pavarotti Visto da Vicino, that the performance was prerecorded weeks earlier. "The orchestra pretended to play for the audience, I pretended to conduct and Luciano pretended to sing. The effect was wonderful," he wrote. Pavarotti's manager, Terri Robson, said that the tenor had turned the Winter Olympic Committee's invitation down several times because it would have been impossible to sing late at night in the sub-zero conditions of Turin in February. The committee eventually persuaded him to take part by pre-recording the song.

=== Protests by artists ===
On occasion, some vocalists have protested being asked to lip sync on television programs by blatantly drawing attention to the fact they are not singing live. John Lennon, in late 1965, during an alternate video taping version of We Can Work It Out, clowned around on the keyboard. In May 1980, when Public Image Limited singer John Lydon performed on American Bandstand, instead he sat on the floor of the studio, threw himself into the assembled audience, and stuck his nose into the camera while recordings over his own voice played". When appearing on a TV program in Detroit in 1966, Frank Zappa and his band similarly gathered on a "stage" with items from the station's props department, and asked his band members to perform "a repeatable physical action, not necessarily in sync with (or even related to) the lyrics, and do it over and over until our spot on the show was concluded", leading to a performance Zappa described as "Detroit's first whiff of homemade prime-time Dada."

Morrissey protested a similar policy on the BBC music programme Top of the Pops by singing "This Charming Man" with a fern plant as a "microphone". When appearing on a German music programme in 1986, English metal band Iron Maiden gave a lip synced performance of "Wasted Years" where the band blatantly swapped instruments mid-song, and at one point had three members "playing" the drums at the same time.

=== Reception and impact ===
Following the Milli Vanilli vocal miming scandal, it "...forever embedded skepticism into the minds (and ears) of the listener." In the fallout of this miming controversy, MTV's Unplugged series was launched, "a showcase for artists wanting to prove they were more than just studio creations". As the show used live performances with singers and acoustic instruments, it required performers to "...display their unembellished voices and ability to perform live." On MTV Unplugged, artists could not use lip syncing, backup tracks, synthesizers, and racks of vocal effects. With Unplugged, authenticity in live performances again became an important value in popular music.

Ellie Goulding and Ed Sheeran have called for honesty in live shows by joining the "Live Means Live" campaign. "Live Means Live" was launched by songwriter/composer David Mindel. When a band displays the "Live Means Live" logo, the audience knows, "there's no Auto-Tune, nothing that isn't 100 per cent live" in the show, and there are no backing tracks.

== In video ==
=== Film ===
In film production, lip syncing is often part of the post-production phase. Most film today contains scenes where the dialogue has been re-recorded afterwards; lip syncing is the technique used when animated characters speak, and lip syncing is essential when films are dubbed into other languages. In many musical films, actors sang their own songs beforehand in a recording session and lip synced during filming, but many also lip synced to playback singers, voices other than their own. Rex Harrison was the exception in My Fair Lady. Marni Nixon sang for Deborah Kerr in The King and I and for Audrey Hepburn in My Fair Lady, Annette Warren for Ava Gardner in Show Boat, Robert McFerrin for Sidney Poitier in Porgy and Bess, Betty Wand for Leslie Caron in Gigi, Lisa Kirk for Rosalind Russell in Gypsy, and Bill Lee for Christopher Plummer in The Sound of Music.

Some pre-overdubbed performances have survived, such as Hepburn's original My Fair Lady vocals (included in documentaries related to the film), and Gardner's original vocals in Show Boat were heard for the first time in the 1994 documentary That's Entertainment! III. When songs appear in non-musical films, however, the actors sing live on set, but later dub their voices in ADR using a "better" performance of the song.

Lip syncing is almost always used in modern musical films (The Rocky Horror Picture Show being an exception) and in biopics such as Ray and La Vie en Rose, where the original recording adds authenticity. But some early musicals usually use live recordings.

In the 1950s MGM classic Singin' in the Rain, lip syncing is a major plot point, with Debbie Reynolds' character, Kathy Selden, providing the voice for the character Lina Lamont (played by Jean Hagen). Writing in UK Sunday newspaper The Observer, Mark Kermode noted, "Trivia buffs love to invoke the ironic dubbing of Debbie Reynolds by Betty Noyes on Would You" although he pointed out that "the 19-year-old Reynolds never puts a foot wrong on smashers like Good Morning". Reynolds also later acknowledged Betty Noyes' uncredited contribution to the film, writing: "I sang You Are My Lucky Star with Gene Kelly. It was a very rangy song and done in his key. My part did not come out well, and my singing voice was dubbed in by Betty Royce [sic]".

=== ADR ===
Automated dialogue replacement, also known as "ADR" or "looping", is a film sound technique involving the re-recording of dialogue after photography. Sometimes the dialogue recorded on location is unsatisfactory either because it has too much background noise on it or the director is not happy with the performance, so the actors replace their own voices in a "looping" session after the filming.

=== Animation ===
Another manifestation of lip syncing is the art of making an animated character appear to speak in a prerecorded track of dialogue. The lip sync technique to make an animated character appear to speak involves figuring out the timings of the speech (breakdown) as well as the actual animating of the lips/mouth to match the dialogue track. The earliest examples of lip sync in animation were attempted by Max Fleischer in his 1926 short My Old Kentucky Home. The technique continues to this day, with animated films and television shows such as Shrek, Lilo & Stitch, and The Simpsons using lip syncing to make their artificial characters talk. Lip syncing is also used in comedies such as This Hour Has 22 Minutes and political satire, changing totally or just partially the original wording. It has been used in conjunction with translation of films from one language to another, for example, Spirited Away. Lip syncing can be a very difficult issue in translating foreign works to a domestic release, as a simple translation of the lines often leaves overrun or underrun of high dialog to mouth movements.

=== Language dubbing ===
Quality film dubbing requires that the dialogue is first translated in such a way that the words used can match the lip movements of the actor. This is often hard to achieve if the translation is to stay true to the original dialogue. Elaborate lip sync of dubbing is also a lengthy and expensive process. The more simplified non-phonetic representation of mouth movement in many anime helps this process.

In English-speaking countries, many foreign TV series (especially anime like Pokémon) are dubbed for television broadcast. However, cinematic releases of films tend to come with subtitles instead. The same is true of countries in which the local language is not spoken widely enough to make the expensive dubbing commercially viable (in other words, there is not enough market for it). However, other countries with a large-enough population dub all foreign films into their national language cinematic release. Dubbing is preferred by some because it allows the viewer to focus on the on-screen action, without reading the subtitles.

=== Visual dubbing ===
In the 2020s, deep learning models have been developed to automatically generate lip movements in video that match a given audio input. Unlike traditional lip sync in film dubbing, which relies on voice actors and translators adapting scripts to fit existing mouth movements, AI-driven approaches modify the visual component of a video directly. Wav2Lip (2020), developed at IIIT Hyderabad, was the first speaker-independent model to achieve lip-sync accuracy comparable to real synchronised video across arbitrary identities and languages. This technology has been applied commercially to visual dubbing in film and television, where an actor's on-screen lip movements are adjusted in post-production to match dubbed audio in a target language.

== In video games ==
Early video games did not use any voice sounds, due to technical limitations. In the 1970s and early 1980s, most video games used simple electronic sounds such as bleeps and simulated explosion sounds. At most, these games featured some generic jaw or mouth movement to convey a communication process in addition to text. However, as games become more advanced in the 1990s and 2000s, lip sync and voice acting has become a major focus of many games. In the 2020s, facial animation provided by companies like FaceFX allows for synchronization more efficiently.

=== Role-playing games ===
Lip sync was for some time a minor focus in role-playing video games. Because of the amount of information conveyed through the game, the majority of communication uses of scrolling text. Older RPGs rely solely on text, using inanimate portraits to provide a sense of who is speaking. Some games make use of voice acting, such as Grandia II or Diablo, but due to simple character models, there is no mouth movement to simulate speech. RPGs for hand-held systems are still largely based on text, with the rare use of lip sync and voice files being reserved for full motion video cutscenes. Newer RPGs, have extensive audio dialogues. The Neverwinter Nights series are examples of transitional games where important dialogue and cutscenes are fully voiced, but less important information is still conveyed in text. In games such as Jade Empire and Knights of the Old Republic, developers created partial artificial languages to give the impression of full voice acting without having to actually voice all dialogue.

=== Strategy games ===
Unlike RPGs, strategy video games make extensive use of sound files to create an immersive battle environment. Most games simply played a recorded audio track on cue with some games providing inanimate portraits to accompany the respective voice. StarCraft used full motion video character portraits with several generic speaking animations that did not synchronize with the lines spoken in the game. The game did, however, make extensive use of recorded speech to convey the game's plot, with the speaking animations providing a good idea of the flow of the conversation. Warcraft III used fully rendered 3D models to animate speech with generic mouth movements, both as character portraits as well as the in-game units. Like the FMV portraits, the 3D models did not synchronize with actual spoken text, while in-game models tended to simulate speech by moving their heads and arms rather than using actual lip synchronization. Similarly, the game Codename Panzers uses camera angles and hand movements to simulate speech, as the characters have no actual mouth movement. However, StarCraft II used fully synced unit portraits and cinematic sequences.

=== First-person shooters ===
FPS is a genre that generally places much more emphasis on graphical display, mainly due to the camera almost always being very close to character models. Due to increasingly detailed character models requiring animation, FPS developers assign many resources to create realistic lip synchronization with the many lines of speech used in most FPS games. Early 3D models used basic up-and-down jaw movements to simulate speech. As technology progressed, mouth movements began to closely resemble real human speech movements. Medal of Honor: Frontline dedicated a development team to lip sync alone, producing the most accurate lip synchronization for games at that time. Since then, games like Medal of Honor: Pacific Assault and Half-Life 2 have made use of coding that dynamically simulates mouth movements to produce sounds as if they were spoken by a live person, resulting in astoundingly lifelike characters. Gamers who create their own videos using character models with no lip movements, such as the helmeted Master Chief from Halo, improvise lip movements by moving the characters' arms, bodies and making a bobbing movement with the head (see Red vs. Blue).

== Television transmission synchronization ==
An example of a lip synchronization problem, also known as lip sync error, is the case in which television video and audio signals are transported via different facilities (e.g., a geosynchronous satellite radio link and a landline) that have significantly different delay times. In such cases, it is necessary to delay the earlier of the two signals electronically.

Lip sync issues have become a serious problem for the television industry worldwide. Lip sync problems are not only annoying but can lead to subconscious viewer stress which in turn leads to viewer dislike of the television program they are watching. Television industry standards organizations have become involved in setting standards for lip sync errors. In 2015 SMPTE (the Society of Motion Picture and Television Engineers) adopted Standard ST2064 which provides technology for greatly reducing or eliminating lip sync errors in television programming.

== Finger syncing ==
The miming of the playing of a musical instrument, also called finger-syncing, is the instrument equivalent of lip syncing. A notable example of miming includes John Williams' piece at President Obama's inauguration, which was a recording made two days earlier and mimed by musicians Yo-Yo Ma and Itzhak Perlman. The musicians wore earpieces to hear the playback. During Whitney Houston's performance of "The Star Spangled Banner" with full orchestra, a pre-recorded version was used: "At the game, everyone was playing, and Whitney was singing, but there were no live microphones," orchestra director Kathryn Holm McManus revealed in 2001. "Everyone was lip synching or finger-synching."

== See also ==
- Audio synchronizer
- John Epperson
- Playback singer
- Presentation timestamp
- Ventriloquism
- Visual dubbing
- Deepfake
