= Kalyeserye =

Soap opera parody segment

- Also known as: Juan for All, All for Juan: Kalyeserye
- Genre: Romantic Comedy; Dramedy; Parody
- Created by: Jenny Ferre
- Directed by: Bert de Leon; Ding Bolanos; Poochie Rivera; Rich Ilustre
- Creative director: Jenny Ferre
- Starring: Maine Mendoza; Alden Richards; Wally Bayola; Paolo Ballesteros; Jose Manalo
- Opening theme: Juan For All, All for Juan Theme
- Ending theme: (Ending theme varies)
- Country of origin: Philippines
- Original language: Tagalog
- No. of seasons: 2
- No. of episodes: 400 (final)

Production
- Executive producers: Helen Atienza dela Cruz; Dhory Marquez; Shiela Macariola-Ilacad; Liza Marcelo-Lazatin
- Producers: Antonio P. Tuviera; Malou Choa-Fagar
- Production locations: Broadway Centrum; Various barangays
- Camera setup: Multiple-camera setup; split screen
- Running time: 20–40 minutes (weekdays); 1–2 hours (Saturdays)
- Production company: TAPE Inc.

Original release
- Network: GMA Network
- Release: July 16, 2015 – December 17, 2016

Kalyeserye was a soap opera parody segment that was aired live on the Filipino noontime variety show Eat Bulaga! on GMA Network. The show-within-a-show, as it had evolved, focused on AlDub, the fictional couple pairing of Alden Richards and Maine Mendoza's "Yaya Dub" character in which the two only communicate through lip-syncing to various pop songs and movie audio clips as well as written messages, and interact only on the show's split-screen frame. Richards is usually based in Broadway Centrum studio of Eat Bulaga! in Quezon City, Metro Manila while Mendoza travels around to a different external location.

The immediate success of Kalyeserye led to its runtime being expanded to at least an hour through the segment's run. The show featured live improvisation from Alden Richards, Maine Mendoza, Wally Bayola, Jose Manalo and Paolo Ballesteros, who all played various roles while the other hosts of Eat Bulaga! in the studio served as live commentators (usually as a live "panel" consisting of 3–4 hosts) that interact with the characters and also with the audience. Kalyeserye had elements of comedy-drama, parody, romantic comedy and reality television. According to Anna Leah Sarabia, a Filipino anthropologist, the segment uses fairy tale and soap opera tropes. The term "Kalyeserye", coined by Eat Bulaga! host Joey de Leon, is a play on the Filipino word teleserye (television series) and is a portmanteau of the Tagalog words kalye (street, from Spanish calle) and serye (series, serie); the term refers to the location outside the studio, which was usually shot out on the streets of Metro Manila or in the provinces of the Philippines that serve as the remote setting of the parody segment.

The portion proved to be a success in both television and social media, resulting in a significant increase in viewership and popularity of Eat Bulaga!. The segment helped put the showbiz careers of Richards and Mendoza on the map.

Kalyeserye temporarily ended on September 3, 2016 and returned on October 15, 2016, after a month-break. The entire segment concluded on December 17, 2016.

On July 16, 2025, Eat Bulaga! celebrated Kalyeserye's 10th anniversary through an elaborate tribute. Prior to this, speculation about a possible return of the segment for a third installment arose following the release of several teasers posted on Eat Bulaga!'s social media pages. On July 20, 2025, a podcast series commemorating the segment, entitled Tamang Panahon was launched by the program—currently under the production of TVJ Productions and airing on TV5 after severing ties with TAPE Inc. on May 31, 2023. The series depicts some of the best moments of the segment and production secrets behind the phenomenal success. Mendoza revealed that they invited Richards for the podcast, but was unable to attend that day due to prior commitments. Additionally, the show's headwriter, Jenny Ferre has disclosed in the podcast that there will no longer be a continuation of the series.

== Overview ==
The show follows the love story of Yaya Dub (Mendoza), a girl who converses only in dubsmash (lip-syncing to phrases from songs and other audio clips), and Alden Richards, a regular guest on the "Juan for All, All for Juan" television segment, during which they begin flirting with each other by dubsmashing and exchanging waves. Yaya Dub's employer, Lola Nidora (Bayola), is initially against the couple's budding romance. Lola Nidora then reveals her Book of Secrets/Secret Diary which contains various reasons for her disapproval. The appearance of other characters like the luxurious Frankie Arenolli (from the word arinola, "chamber pot") (Manalo) and the socialite DuhRizz (Bayola) make things even more complicated for the amorous pair. As the story unfolds, characters from Lola Nidora and Yaya Dub's past are revealed as a part of their backstory. Lola Nidora turns out to be one of the triplet children of the Zobeyala family (a parody of the Zóbel de Ayala family); the three are collectively known as the "de Explorer Triplets/Sisters" (in reference to Dora the Explorer). During the course of the series, Alden must prove his trustworthiness and love for Yaya Dub by engaging in several challenges.

From its return for "Season 2", it not only focused on the continuation of the AlDub story as a fictional married couple but also focused on the De Explorer sisters who become hosts for a cooking show, with their real-life mothers as guests, who can cook.

== Background ==
=== Casting ===
In 2015, Alden Richards, who had finished filming the mini-series Ilustrado (2014), was invited to join Eat Bulaga! as a host for a month-long trial period, hosting various segments such as "That's My Bae" with radio disc jockey Sam Y.G. A month later, Maine Mendoza, who had initially gained online popularity by posting her Dubsmash videos in various social media platforms, auditioned for the program after catching the attention of its producers. Mendoza eventually joined the cast in July 2015. She was initially selected to act as a lawyer for Eat Bulaga!'s "Juan for All, All for Juan" segment but was ultimately cast as Yaya Dub, a nanny for Wally Bayola's "Lola Nidora" character. Mendoza's character would communicate only by lip-synching to various pop songs and film audio clips and could not actually speak onscreen. Her character was portrayed as a very serious and snobbish nanny who does not even smile or laugh. The characters Doña Nidora and Yaya Dub first appeared on July 4, 2015, in the "Problem Solving" portion of the "Juan For All, All For Juan" segment performed in Cainta, Rizal east of Manila. Their presence filled the void left by Doktora Dora de Explorer's character (also played by Bayola), who has left the previous day to attend a seminar in South Africa. However, the Kalyeserye segment officially started on July 16, 2015, when Yaya Dub sees Alden for the first time.^{Day 1}

=== "Day 1" onwards ===
On the episode broadcast July 16, 2015 (retroactively referred to as "Day 1"), performed in Olongapo, Zambales, Mendoza broke out of her "Yaya Dub" character when she accidentally smiled after noticing Alden Richards watching her on the show's live split screen. Upon seeing Mendoza's spontaneous reaction, the studio panel members Allan K. and Joey de Leon teased the pair and thus prompted the producers to make an on-screen couple of the two. Mike Tuviera, a resident director of the show, revealed that the resulting "love team", christened "AlDub", was formed by accident because of the pair's natural on-screen chemistry.

Due to the audiences' positive reception to the pairing, the producers decided to make a 30-minute portion under its daily "Juan For All, All for Juan" segment to replace "Problem Solving". Pegged as Kalyeserye, it was characterized as a dramedy series with elements of parody of Philippine television drama, romantic comedy and reality TV performed by improv acting, broadcast live from the streets of different towns and cities. Poochie Rivera, one of the program's directors, described it as "natural and unscripted", saying that "Nothing is rehearsed. We are trying to maintain the spontaneity because that is a big part of its charm." Aside from the AlDub love team, Kalyeserye also featured comedians Jose Manalo, Wally Bayola, and Paolo Ballesteros. The trio, collectively known as "JoWaPao", played various characters, but most prominently, as the three lolas (grandmothers) of Yaya Dub.

=== AlDub ===
AlDub is derived from a portmanteau of the show's main characters' names, Alden Richards, who portrays a fictionalized version of himself, and Yaya Dub, portrayed by comedian Maine Mendoza. Both joining the program's cast in 2015, Richards first appeared as a host of Eat Bulaga!'s various segments, such as the "That's My Bae"; while Mendoza appeared only as "Yaya Dub" in the "Juan for All, All for Juan" segment. The couple exclusively interacted through the show's split screen frame and only communicated with each other by dubbing audio samples of popular songs, films and TV series as well as handwritten messages (or "fan signs") on screen. As of early October 2015, the AlDub couple had yet to meet in person.

Some of the running gags and gimmicks throughout the parody series include a special gesture between Alden and Yaya Dub, called the Pabebe Wave. Another narrative involves Lola Nidora lobbying for a pairing between Yaya Dub and Frankie Arenolli dubbed as the "YaKie" tandem, with the couple almost ended up getting married. Other events include Lola Nidora issuing labor challenges to Alden to prove his love for Yaya Dub, and the incompetency of the numerous Rogelios, Lola Nidora's bodyguards. The Kalyeserye's main storyline is the Cinderella-like forbidden courtship between the AlDub tandem, with its paramount goal being the first physical meeting of the two, a move continually opposed by Lola Nidora.

The AlDub couple's near-encounters on live television also became pivotal throughout the series. In the show's August 8, 2015 episode, which featured the first wedding between the "YaKie" tandem, Mendoza collapsed unexpectedly while performing on live television and was immediately rushed to a nearby hospital, resulting in an improvisation by the segment's remaining characters — Frankie (Manalo), Lola Nidora (Bayola) and Alden himself. Mendoza later revealed through her social media accounts that she experienced fatigue hours prior to the show. In its August 12, 2015 episode, Yaya Dub appeared at Broadway Centrum's TAPE Eastside Studio for her Cinderella-themed performance on Eat Bulaga!'s "Bulaga Pa More! Dabarkads Pa More!" segment. The episode marked as the closest rendezvous between the two, only to be interrupted by Lola Nidora, who played as an evil witch and forced Yaya Dub to leave in the middle of her performance.

=== Tamang Panahon ===
The series reached the climax of its story on the October 24, 2015 episode entitled "Sa Tamang Panahon"(In the Right Time). Approximately 55,000 people gathered at the Philippine Arena in Bocaue, Bulacan to witness the most awaited meeting of Alden and Yaya Dub; the couple was able to see and interact with each other without any hindrance from Lola Nidora. One hundred percent of ticket sales (Php 14 million) was allotted for the AlDub Library Project, which aimed to build libraries for less fortunate schools across the country. With 41 million tweets within 24 hours, #ALDubEBTamangPanahon, the official hashtag of the event, became the third most tweeted topic for the TV category worldwide in 2015 and the most used hashtag within 24 hours on Twitter. The show garnered a 50.8% rating in Mega Manila, becoming the highest-rated episode of Eat Bulaga! and the most watched show in 2015.

=== Wedding ===
Kalyeserye went on a hiatus on September 3, 2016, to give way to new segments. The story concluded with Lola Nidora and Lola Tinidora leaving to go to the United States. After a month break, the series returned on October 15, 2016. The storyline opened five years later with the three lolas returning to the Philippines and Alden asking them for Maine's hand in marriage. The week then focused on the couple's preparations for their marriage.

On October 22, 2016, two days before the anniversary of Sa Tamang Panahon, the wedding of AlDub took place at the Shrine of Jesus the Divine Word in Quezon City. #ALDUBWedding, the official Twitter hashtag for the awaited event, gained over 6 million tweets within 24 hours. The seemingly realistic wedding marked another milestone for the love team's story, sealing their marriage with a kiss.

=== Ending and concert tour ===
Kalyeserye ended on December 17, 2016, with AlDub's twin babies baptized and the family ready to migrate to Russia with Lola Babah.

The following year, the story continued with an American concert tour called KS sa US (KS in the US). The concert tour began on April 9 at the Pasadena Civic Auditorium in Pasadena, California and concluded on April 12 at Kings Theatre in Brooklyn, New York.

== Characters ==
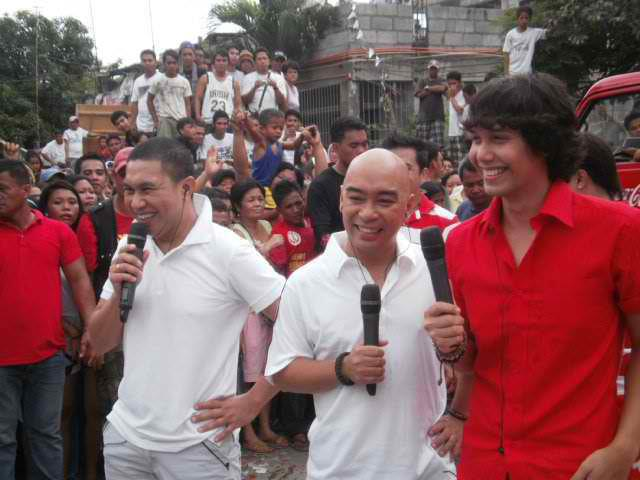
The main cast of the series, Jose Manalo, Wally Bayola and Paolo Ballesteros who play various roles.

Some members of the cast as portraying as the characters from Kalyeserye.

=== Main characters ===
Yaya Dub
Portrayed by: Maine Mendoza; Unknown (young version, during her childhood)
Divina Ursula Bokbokova Smash (a playful reverse-acronym of Dubsmash), is a woman who primarily communicates only by lip-synching audio clips of songs and speeches in the show. She only starts speaking using her real voice much later in the series.^{Day 64} She was initially introduced in the Problem Solving segments as the snobbish nanny of Lola Nidora. In her first split-screen interaction with Alden Richards, her smiling at him garnered notice by the Eat Bulaga hosts.^{Day 1} Her parents are Ursula Palais (Isadora's daughter) and Teodoro "Dodong" Smash (Zobeyala's former gardener).^{Day 82} It is later revealed that Divina actually was the only granddaughter of the Zobeyala-De Explorer Triplets' adopted sister Isadora. Yaya Dub was abandoned as a child by her parents and grandmother Isadora,^{Day 81} so she had been with Lola Nidora for most of her childhood. She graduated in culinary arts and is currently studying for a second degree majoring in business administration.

Alden
Portrayed by: Alden Richards;
Originally appearing as a talk show guest, Alden begins flirting with Yaya Dub and even tries to communicate with her using dubsmash.^{Day 1} He is the grandson of the very wealthy Lola Babah. Over the series, he goes through several challenges to prove his love for Yaya Dub.

Lola Nidora/ Doña Nidora Esperanza Zobeyala Viuda de Explorer
Portrayed by: Wally Bayola; Maine Mendoza (young version, during the post-WW2 years)
Doña Nidora Esperanza Zobeyala Viuda de Explorer, more commonly referred as Lola Nidora, is Yaya's former employer and adoptive grandmother.^{Day 1} She graduated from Ateneo de Municipal in Spain majoring in philosophy, language, culture and history. She also went to Universidad Central de Madrid in 1878, and during that time, she was given the Sobra Saliente (Most Outstanding) Award. Lola Nidora is also a philanthropist and was one of world's wealthiest people in the 1900s. Lola Nidora was reportedly courted by such figures as Adolf Hitler, Charlie Chaplin, Albert Einstein, Antonio Luna, Ferdinand Magellan and Anselmo, but she repudiated them all. Her character is loosely based on Filipina actresses Celia Rodriguez and Jaclyn Jose. When she becomes stressed, she acts and talks like Filipino comedian Babalu. Lola Nidora initially did not approve of Alden's and Yaya Dub's romance and is the major antagonist during the first part of the series. Despite her strict demeanor, she imparts words of wisdom hoping that Yaya could learn from them.

Lola Tidora
Portrayed by: Paolo Ballesteros
Lola Tidora Zobeyala is Lola Nidora's triplet sister who resides in Massachusetts. She has a knack of revealing secrets and is into modern ideals.^{Day 35} She is also up-to-date with current trends, especially with regards to make-up and fashion. Tidora usually steps in when her sister Tinidora loses her patience with anyone, especially with their older sister, Nidora. Most of the time, Tidora translates Yaya Dub's lip-synching language and is usually the first to overreact in certain situations. Tidora is in favor of Alden as a partner for Maine and often helps the couple with their courtship. Her signature expression is "Wooooh", imitating singer Regine Velasquez' high-pitched call. According to Nidora, she studied acting in Massachusetts and continues to pursue a career in music. She also serves as Yaya Dub's singing teacher and make-up artist. ^{Day 71} As said by Tinidora, Tidora is the most knowledgeable when it comes to charity work, which the lolas do every now and then. ^{Day 76} Lola Tidora usually enters with a song number dubbing whistle notes of Mariah Carey's songs and is sometimes carried by the Bernardos.

Lola Tinidora
Portrayed by: Jose Manalo
Lola Tinidora Zobeyala is the liberated and free-spirited triplet sister of Nidora and Tidora.^{Day 38} She apparently, is the most feisty and protective among the 3 lolas, ready to defend her family whenever required. Tinidora briefly took care of the much younger Yaya Dub before the child's care was eventually left to Nidora. Tinidora was rumored to be Yaya Dub's real mother but she had denied the report as she believed the real mother of Yaya Dub is Isadora, their fourth and youngest sibling. Tinidora once revealed that she had a past relationship with a certain American named "Bill",^{Day 65} but broke up with him after he tricked her into marrying a cactus around 90 years ago. This is why she always warns Rihanna not to be careful with her British boyfriend so as to have the same fate as hers. Tinidora is also in favor of Alden as a suitable partner for Yaya Dub, and often persuades Nidora to let the couple go on their dates. Lola Tinidora is often seen wearing a short skirt and going up ladders/stairs dancing to Mambo No. 5 and she was thought to have studied dance in Europe which led her to teach choreography to Yaya Dub and the Rogelios. In a post-Halloween episode, Tinidora has an experience as a witch doctor. ^{Day 94}

=== Supporting characters ===
Rogelios
Lola Nidora's bodyguards who are always shown wearing matching light blue barong tagalog shirts and sunglasses.^{Day 8} Lola Nidora also asks them to do menial tasks (like carrying her bag) but is frequently mad at them because of their incompetence. The actors who portray the Rogelios on-set are real-life bouncers who enforce crowd control during the outside broadcast.

Eat Bulaga! hosts
The hosts of Eat Bulaga! provide narration and commentary to the show. They include: Tito Sotto, Vic Sotto, Joey de Leon, Allan K and other members of the Eat Bulaga family known as EB Dabarkads. Paolo Ballesteros and Jose Manalo occasionally appear as themselves when they are not playing character roles. The hosts often break the fourth wall in various instances as they interact with the characters. The panel also serves as additional comic relief and provides insights on the story.

The Audience
The Audience in the Studio are served as the reactors of AlDub and the Lolas.

Gasgas
Portrayed by: Jose Manalo
Gasgas Abelgas was the former narrator of Kalyeserye who summarized the day's events. He is a parody of journalist Gus Abelgas.^{Day 11} He acts as a narrator when a Kalyeserye episode ends and summarizes the day's events. Gasgas is replaced by Ging-Ging. The name "Gasgas" is the Filipino word for "bruises" and "scratches", which Manalo often uses as gag material, referring to his facial skin stricken with scars.

Ate Ging-Ging
Portrayed by: Jose Manalo
Ging-Ging was a substitute narrator for episodes where Lola Nidora reads her Secret Diary. She later replaced Gasgas as the main narrator. She is a parody of Ging-Ging, a character from the children's TV series Batibot.

Gosgos
Portrayed by: Paolo Ballesteros
Gosgos was the self-proclaimed wife of Gasgas Abelgas and his female counterpart, who occasionally replaced him when he was not available to narrate. Later in the series, Gosgos introduced herself as Lola Tidora and is thus coined by Joey as Gasgas Songbird. The name Gosgos is derived from the Filipino term gusgus meaning "dirty".

Yaya Gasgas
Portrayed by: Maine Mendoza (lip-sync), Wally Bayola and Alden Richards (voice overs)
Yaya Gasgas is another female narrator who appears as a substitute to Gasgas and Gosgos. On-screen, she recaps the episode by mouthing lines spoken by Bayola mostly off-screen. Richards substituted for Bayola when the former was not present.

Kiko Matsing
Portrayed by: Wally Bayola
Kiko accompanies Ging-Ging in some episodes.

Mengging
Portrayed by: Maine Mendoza
She is a substitute "narrator" for Ging-Ging while Lola Tinidora is absent. Other spellings include Maginging, Mingging, and Pabebeng Mengging.

Singaw
Portrayed by: Jose Manalo
Singaw was a guest narrator for one time episode. He is a parody of Imaw, a character from Encantadia. "Singaw" is the Filipino word for "steam".

=== Major recurring characters ===
Doktora Dora da Explorer

Portrayed by: Wally Bayola
Doktora Dora de Explorer is a daughter of Doktora Donita de Explorer albularyo (quack doctor) and originally part of the Problem Solving segment, but she left to attend a seminar in South Africa. Her character is later brought back as one of Lola Nidora's grandchildren.^{Day 16} It is revealed that Dora is an AlDub fan and that Doktora and Yaya Dub are childhood friends. Doktora returns from time to time to visit her grandmother and her grandaunts, and usually gives them her concoctions called DDD, or Doktora Dora Drinks.

Jimmy

Portrayed by: Jimmy Santos
Lola Nidora's initial love interest who also uses Dubsmash as a way of communicating with Nidora.^{Day 4} His pairing with Lola is called the "Lommy" tandem, a portmanteau of their names. Jimmy is sometimes part of the commentary at the Broadway studio.

Frankie

Portrayed by: Jose Manalo
Frankie Amoi Arenolli was born in Turin, Italy. He is an arrogant and boastful Filipino-Chinese-Italian heir who only wants to get married so that he can finally get his inheritance from his family.^{Day 18} He is the grandson of Doña Guada Sevilla de Arenolli and the son of Don Francisco "Franing" Arenolli. He is also the owner of the "Largest Wine company in Italy world" and "Arenolli Airlines". He claims to be so rich enabling him to be an avid shipwreck collector. Lola Nidora arranged his marriage with Yaya Dub in exchange for the ransom money for the "Book of Secrets". After his wedding failed to proceed, Frankie heads back to Italy. He later returns, ^{Day 114} and eventually meets Cindy Kournikova and develops a crush on her. His name "Amoi Arenolli" is a pun on the phrase amoy arinola which loosely translates to "smells like an urinal."

DuhRizz

Portrayed by: Wally Bayola
DuhRizz Maine de Explorer, also known as "Duh", is the rich, liberated, socialite granddaughter of Lola Nidora.^{Day 29} She lives in New York and has decided to return to Manila to visit her sick grandmother. She has a crush on Alden and hates Yaya Dub, whom she sees as a rival. DuhRizz is later revealed to be the mastermind of the couple's abductions.^{Day 51}

Bae-by Baste

Portrayed by: Sebastian Benedict
Bae-by Baste is the 3-year old nephew of Alden. He is Alden's mini version and sometimes becomes his stand-in when Alden is absent.^{Day 35} The name Bae-by is portmanteau of Bae (slang for babe) and baby.

Yaya Luvs

Portrayed by: Ryzza Mae Dizon
Yaya Luvs is Yaya Dub's best friend at the Broadway studio.^{Day 70} She's a kid version of Yaya Dub and also uses Dubsmash to communicate.

Lola Isadora
Portrayed by: Paolo Ballesteros; Patricia Tumulak (young version)
Lola Isadora Palais is Nidora, Tidora and Tinidora's estranged and adopted sister, and is the biological grandmother of Yaya Dub.^{Day 81}

Rihanna

Portrayed by: Wally Bayola
Maria Rihanna Valenciana is the current mayordoma (main chambermaid) of Lola Nidora's mansion.^{Day 60} She is also Yaya Dub's best friend and supports Alden's and Yaya's romance. She is currently in a long-distance relationship with her British chatmate named "Harry".

Lola Babah

Portrayed by: Ai Ai delas Alas
Doña Barbara Laticia Rockefeller Viuda de Faulkerson is the half-Russian and half-Waray grandmother of Alden. She is the very wealthy wife of Babancio Lucas "Babalu" Faulkerson and Lola Nidora's rival. ^{Day 109} The flamboyant grandmother does not approve of Yaya Dub as Alden's partner, and tries to set her grandson up with a Russian model and Harvard graduate, Cindy Kournikova. Lola Babah also happens to be the mortgage holder of the Zobeyala' residence, therefore escalating her rivalry with Lola Nidora.

Cindy

Portrayed by: Alina Bogdanova
Cinderella "Cindy" Kournikova is a young and beautiful Russian model whom Lola Babah favors to be Alden's girlfriend.^{Day 107} Cindy has traveled to Milan, Tokyo, Paris and New York for her work. She studied Culinary Arts majoring in Economics, and International Relations with a minor in Financial Accounting and also majored in Management Communication at Harvard University. She becomes Yaya Dub's rival when she briefly got engaged to Alden upon Lola Babah's direction. However, she later meets the Frankie Arenolli and the two become close.

Bernardos

Portrayed by: Corbin Edmonds, Kyle Perry, and Joco San Juan
They are Lola Tidora's bodyguards and her own version of the Rogelios. They are much younger, handsome, fit and better dancers compared to Nidora's bodyguards. Their uniforms are white shirts, jeans, and they also wear black shades.

Quandos

The Quandos are Lola Tinidora's own bodyguards that started out as just a trio similar to Nidora's "Rogelios" and Tidora's "Bernardos". They are depicted as zombie-like and wear similar white Barong Tagalogs. The Quandos continuously increase their numbers by every episode as Tinidora jokingly states that she recruits additional Quando members by "exhuming them from the nearest cemetery." They were also referred as "The Walking Deads" or "Quandeads" by Joey de Leon.

Riding-in-Tandem

They are the unnamed motorcycle-riding individuals who stole the Book of Secrets/Secret Diary from Lola Nidora. It is unknown if they are also the same individuals who Alden frequently orders to deliver his gifts to Yaya Dub in some episodes. They are sometimes referred to as "Riding-in-Tanders" by Bossing Marvic.

Doña Ariana

Portrayed by: Paolo Ballesteros
Doña Ariana Miley Zobeyala is the mother of Nidora, Tidora and Tinidora and the sister of Tiya Bebeng. She is very strict and does not approve Anselmo as Nidora's partner because of his lower class and provincial background. Her appearance is loosely based on Miss Minchin from Princess Sarah and the late Bella Flores.

Anselmo
Portrayed by: Alden Richards (young version, during Post-War Years in 1945); Eddie Gutierrez (present day)
Anselmo is one of Lola Nidora's love interests during her younger days in 1945. Doña Ariana, Nidora's mother, rejects him because of his lower social status and his small-town upbringing. He is Nidora's most beloved suitor. It is later revealed that Anselmo has a brain tumor, which may explain his constant eye twitching, but the fact is kept secret from Nidora.

Beyonce

Portrayed by: Ann "Hopia" Boleche
Beyonce, or Yaya Mot, is the main chambermaid of Doña Ariana's mansion. She speaks poor English and is being maltreated by Ariana for permitting Nidora to see Anselmo. She is the predecessor of Rihanna Valenciana and also a grandmother of Yaya Glo/Gluta who would later audition for becoming a new kasambahay for Lola Nidora's mansion. Beyonce's nickname "Yaya Mot" is derived from the word yamot (lit. meaning "annoy") and her appearance is loosely based on Becky from Princess Sarah.

Caitlyn

Portrayed by: Allan K
Caitlyn "Dudang" Smash is a rich businesswoman who is the second wife of Dodong and Yaya Dub's stepmother. She visits her stepdaughter and the three lolas Nidora, Tidora and Tinidora during Divina's birthday week. Initially as an elderly, she didn't bear any children. Caitlyn's nickname "Dudang" is derived from the word duda (lit. meaning "suspicious").

Cookie

Portrayed by: Mike "Pekto" Nacua
Cookie is the temporary caretaker of Lola Nidora's mansyon who meets Nidora and Tinidora. She is the one who is seeking for Divina as a new owner of Nidora's mansion. Cookie leaves the mansion to Divina, Nidora and Tinidora after the ownership of the mansion has returned to Nidora. The character reprises from the defunct gag show Nuts Entertainment.

Yaya Pak

Portrayed by: Boobay
Yaya Pak is one of applicants for the position of the new nanny in the Zobeyala household. She fights off the Rogelios before proceeding to Nidora. Yaya Pak becomes the new Yaya after defeating Lola Tinidora in an arm wrestling contest.

Rogelia

Portrayed by: Sinon Loresca
Rogelia is the gay version of a Rogelio who is willing to apply as new bodyguard for Lola Nidora. Nidora initially thought of him as a muscular man much like the rest of the Rogelios, until Tinidora drops a metal tray which made him shocked, revealing his gay personality.^{Day 222}

== Production ==
=== Music ===
Kalyeserye utilized a number of songs while Alden and Yaya Dub communicated through split-screen. The most used songs for their lip-synch interaction include "God Gave Me You" by Bryan White, "Thinking Out Loud" by Ed Sheeran, "Twerk It Like Miley" by Brandon Beal, and "Fantastic Baby" by Big Bang. Alden even sang "God Gave Me You" live before going to Lola Nidora's mansion to visit Yaya Dub for their second date. Yaya Dub and Alden frequently danced in celebration to the tune of "Fantastic Baby". In one episode, the couple also sang "Wish I May", which is included in Alden's titular album, using their own voices and not via Dubsmash/lip-synch as they usually did in the show.

There were also other songs that served as theme music that played when either one or all three sisters, Nidora, Tidora, and Tinidora, entered or exited their scene. Towards the end in most of the episodes of Kalyeserye, the three sisters posed a la Charlie's Angels with "Wannabe" by Spice Girls being played in the background. While entering her scenes, Tinidora and her Quandos would dance to the tune of Lou Bega's "Mambo No. 5". Tidora, before entering the scene, was always shown lip-synching to various Mariah Carey songs. The chorus of the song "Dessert" by Dawin was played when Nidora entered the scene or was feeling very happy. The chorus of "Macarena" by Los del Rio was played when Isadora entered into the scene. The chorus of "Fashionista" by Jimmy James was played when Cindy entered into the scene while modelling.

Prior to the second incarnation, a new set of songs were used during the entrance of Yaya Dub and the Lolas such as "Work" by Rihanna and "Focus" by Ariana Grande.

Towards the end, a new set of songs was used during the entrance of the Lolas such as "Choopeta" by T-Rio (as covered by Leticia) and "Halukay Ube" by SexBomb Girls.

== Reception ==
=== Eat Bulaga! ratings ===
Kalyeserye proved to be a success in both broadcast television and social media. The segment helped boost the show's ratings, the August 12, 2015 episode of Eat Bulaga! posted a 36.1 rating in AGB Nielsen's overnight measurements among Mega Manila households, the highest rating for the year. The AlDub couple became an overnight phenomenon on both television and social media. The pivotal wedding episode between the YaKie tandem on August 8, 2015, scored a 32% percent rating and a 300% increase in viewership for Eat Bulaga!, according to the Nielsen ratings conducted by AGB Nielsen Philippines. On a weekly survey by Kantar Media Philippines, the tandem was cited in helping the program to become a number one daytime program for weeks. According to AGB Nielsen's research, the August 12, 2015 episode marked the first time that the show reached the all-time high in viewership for the year with a 36.1% rating, which was mainly alluded to the tandem's near-meeting. More than a month later, on September 26, 2015, during the tandem's second date, the show broke their previous record with a 45.7% rating. Almost a month later, Eat Bulaga breached the 50% mark at 50.8%, superseding their previous turnout.

Below is the list of Eat Bulaga Kalyeserye episodes #AlDub

Name of the show, episodes, date and year listed and company
Title	Episodes	Ratings	Date and year	Company	Ref.
Eat Bulaga; Kalyserye	Yaya Dub meets Alden	21.1%	July 16, 2015	AGB Nielsen	
Eat Bulaga; Kalyserye	On-screen	22.6%	July 18, 2015	AGB Nielsen	
Eat Bulaga; Kalyserye	AlDub PaMore	24.6%	July 28, 2015	AGB Nielsen	
Eat Bulaga; Kalyserye	AlDub to the Rescue	28.1%	August 1, 2015	AGB Nielsen	
Eat Bulaga; Kalyserye	AlDub We Belong Together	32.4%	August 8, 2015	AGB Nielsen	
Eat Bulaga; Kalyserye	AlDub Game of Destiny	31.6%	August 11, 2015	AGB Nielsen	
Eat Bulaga; Kalyserye	AlDub Bulaga pa more!	36.1%	August 12, 2015	AGB Nielsen	
Eat Bulaga; Kalyserye	AlDub For you I will	33.8%	August 15, 2015	AGB Nielsen	
Eat Bulaga; Kalyserye	AlDub Against all odds	39%	August 22, 2015	AGB Nielsen	
Eat Bulaga; Kalyserye	AlDub MiaDen Heaven	34%	August 29, 2015	AGB Nielsen	
Eat Bulaga; Kalyserye	AlDub the Revelation	35.1%	August 31, 2015	AGB Nielsen	
Eat Bulaga; Kalyserye	AlDub Battle for a cause	39.5%	Sept. 5, 2015	AGB Nielsen	
Eat Bulaga; Kalyserye	AlDub the Abduction	36%	Sept. 12, 2015	AGB Nielsen	
Eat Bulaga; Kalyserye	AlDub Most Awaited Date	43.1%	Sept. 19, 2015	AGB Nielsen	
Eat Bulaga; Kalyserye	AlDub EB for Love	45.7%	Sept. 26, 2015	AGB Nielsen	
Eat Bulaga; Kalyserye	AlDub meets TVJ	42.7%	Oct. 3, 2015	AGB Nielsen	
Eat Bulaga; Kalyserye	EB Dabarkads pa more!	40.7%	Oct. 10, 2015	AGB Nielsen	
Eat Bulaga; Kalyserye	AlDub The Big Surprise	38.8%	Oct. 17, 2015	AGB Nielsen	
Eat Bulaga; Kalyserye	AlDub EB "Tamang Panahon"	50.8%	Oct. 24, 2015	AGB Nielsen	

=== Cultural impact ===
Eat Bulaga! director Poochie Rivera theorized that the coupling's successful response from audiences was because of the Filipinos who can relate with their predicament. He remarked, "People who have partners who work abroad often communicate and pursue their relationship online, through Skype or FaceTime." Pauleen Luna, a castmember of Eat Bulaga!, commented that AlDub "has brought a different kind of energy to the show." Anthropologist Anna Leah Sarabia cited the use of fairy tale and soap opera tropes contributed to the tandem's increasing popularity, saying, "It's a 'Cinderella' story that's fake and true-life at the same time." Television executive Malou Choa-Fagar also cited the unpredictable nature of the Kalyeserye had largely contributed to the AlDub success. On Twitter, hashtags with AlDub became top trending topics in both the Philippine and Worldwide trends. Various outlets also lauded the show's use of old and new media for the AlDub tandem, which also pulsated in raising the value of the Dubsmash app in the Philippines. The popularity of the tandem even reached some schools and became a topic discussed in classrooms; for instance in a University of the Philippines Diliman Filipino class. Several Filipino politicians also referenced the AlDub couple in various interviews: Ralph Recto cited the tandem as a symbolism regarding the Philippine Land Transportation Office license plates, while Mar Roxas also referenced AlDub in his 2016 presidential campaign.

The August 22, 2015 episode earned positive feedback from Catholic Bishops' Conference of the Philippines (CBCP) and Radyo Veritas via Twitter for highlighting Filipino love, responsibility and marriage moral standards. Mendoza (as Yaya Dub), Bayola (as Lola Nidora), Eat Bulaga and TAPE Inc. were awarded by the 1st Catholic Social Media Awards for promotion of values. Maine Mendoza was also awarded the Gintong Kabataan Award by the Provincial Government of Bulacan.

Professor Randy David of the University of the Philippines, in the August 23, 2015 edition of his Philippine Daily Inquirer column Public Lives, wrote about the depth and significance of Maine Mendoza's voice/mime characterization of Yaya Dub, challenging people to look deep within his nature, and who he really is when not performing:

Indeed, we may as well ask the same question of ourselves: Who are we when we are not performing? I think that if there is anything that Yaya Dub has shown us, it is the stereotypical and "mediatized" nature of our emotions and modes of expression. In that sense, we are performing all the time. What we think are spontaneous feelings that we communicate from the depth of our beings are really nothing but ready-made emoticons that other people have deployed in various other contexts. The shock of that recognition, I am certain, is what sustains the fascination with Yaya Dub. She gets behind all of us, and lip-syncs the standard texts of our private selves—our insecurities, anger, celebratory moments, and frustrations. Beneath the performance is parody of the highest type.

=== Social media ===
The segment was also a frequent Twitter trending topic while the abridged versions uploaded in Eat Bulaga!'s Facebook page and highlights on GMA Network's YouTube channel had become viral. From July 27, 2015, to August 26, 2015, 16 out of the 30 Philippine trending topics are from the show's AlDub tandem.

==== Twitter records ====
On August 29, 2015, 3.5 million messages were sent on Twitter with the hashtag #ALDUBMaidenHeaven, a record number of tweets in the Philippines about a single subject. This amount, which was achieved in one day, exceeded the number of Tweets sent with the hashtag #PapalVisit, during Pope Francis's January 2015 visit in the Philippines, a predominantly Catholic nation. However, the October 24, 2015 record with the hashtag #ALDubEBTamangPanahon currently stands as the most tweeted at 41 million, beating the 2014 World Cup match between Brazil and Germany.

=== Careers of Richards and Mendoza ===
The success of the AlDub tandem also contributed to the careers of Richards and Mendoza. Kalyeserye helped Richards secure a four-year film contract with APT Entertainment, while the Philippine Basketball Association team Barangay Ginebra San Miguel and Mahindra Enforcers was also reported to have been considering inviting Mendoza as their muse for the 2015–16 PBA season, but she refused. Mendoza and Richards also appeared in separate profile interviews regarding the AlDub's success on the television program Kapuso Mo, Jessica Soho. Tuviera also revealed in an interview about a possibility of making 2015 feature film starring the AlDub couple. Another report also confirmed that Richards and Mendoza would be part of 41st Metro Manila Film Festival entry My Bebe Love starring Vic Sotto and Ai Ai delas Alas.

In an interview with the celebrity talk show Startalk, Richards revealed that he did not expect the success of the show/segment and was overwhelmed by the popularity of the AlDub tandem. In other interviews, Richards revealed that he was open to the possibility of AlDub to star in a movie or TV show.

To date, Mendoza has appeared in advertisements for 555 Sardines and O+ Ultra (with Wally Bayola in his Lola Nidora character), while both Richards and Mendoza have appeared together for McDonald's Philippines' promoting their Chicken Fillet ala King product, Talk 'N Text's Extend promo, Zonrox Plus Thick Bleach and Bear Brand Adult Plus.

After the Tamang Panahon event, Mendoza commenced her co-hosting stint in the Juan For All, All For Juan segment and (briefly) the ATM with the Baes segment with Alden Richards in Eat Bulaga!. Mendoza and Richards have their first photoshoot for the movie My Bebe Love, alongside Vic Sotto and Ai Ai delas Alas. Mendoza made her television drama debut as Chef Elize in Princess in the Palace which stars Ryzza Mae Dizon.

=== Tenth anniversary: Tamang Panahon podcast ===
On July 16, 2025, Eat Bulaga! celebrated the Kalyeserye's 10th anniversary through an elaborate tribute. Prior to this, speculation about a possible return of the segment for a third installment arose following the release of several teasers posted on the program's social media pages. On July 20, 2025, a podcast series commemorating the segment, entitled Tamang Panahon was launched, hosted by Manalo, Bayola, Ballesteros and Mendoza as well as producer Jenny Ferre. By this point, Eat Bulaga! had transferred to TV5 effective July 1, 2023 under the purview of the joint-venture TVJ Productions after the hosts and production staff severed ties with TAPE Inc..

== See also ==
- Notable uses of split-screen
- Destined to be Yours
- Eat Bulaga! Lenten Specials

== Works cited ==
- "Day" refers to an episode in the Kalyeserye series.
