= AlDub =

- Eat Bulaga' Kalyeserye character
- Alden (Alden Richards) and Yaya Dub (Maine Mendoza) interacting through split screen television
- Portrayed by: Alden Richards as Alden and young Anselmo; Maine Mendoza as Divina Ursula Bokbokova or Yaya Dub
- Duration: 2015 – 2023
- First appearance: Eat Bulaga' Kalyeserye
- Last appearance: Love is...
- Appears on: Kalyeserye; My BebeLove #KiligPaMore; Imagine You and Me; Destined to be Yours; Love is...
- Created by: TAPE Inc. (2015–2023); GMA Network (2015–2023)

AlDub was a love team which originated from the Kalyeserye portion of the "Juan for All, All for Juan" segment of the variety show Eat Bulaga! The name was derived from a portmanteau of the name of the two characters in Kalyeserye, namely Filipino actor Alden Richards, who portrays a fictionalized version of himself, and Yaya Dub (Divina Ursula Bokbokova Smash, a reverse-acronym of Dubsmash), portrayed by Dubsmash Queen personality and socialite actress Maine Mendoza, who initially does not talk and interacts through lip-syncing.

== Background ==
A 30-minute to 1-hour soap opera parody titled Kalyeserye (literally translated as "street series") was created within the "Juan for All, All for Juan" segment for the tandem, featuring live improv acting from the AlDub supercouple and its additional characters–Filipino comedians Wally Bayola (primarily as Lola Nidora), Jose Manalo (primarily as Lola Tinidora), and Paolo Ballesteros (primarily as Lola Tidora) as various characters. The segment proved to be a success in both broadcast television and social media, resulting in a significant increase of viewership and popularity of Eat Bulaga!. In addition, it has also contributed to the careers of Richards and Mendoza.

As of late, different media outlets had hailed AlDub as a "social media phenomenon" following its success in trending everyday on Twitter and other social media platforms. Record-breaking tweets correlate to a pivotal episode of Kalyeserye, mostly about AlDub's continuing romance. Such is the case on September 5, 2015, as the couple finally saw each other for the first time after their respective performances in the Bulaga Pa More! Dabarkads Edition wildcard round. Subsequent meetings for the pair happened in the weeks that followed, advancing the storyline of Kalyeserye.

On September 26, 2015, they first reached record-breaking tweets on Twitter for #ALDubEBforLOVE with 25.6 million tweets in just a day, breaking their own record of 12.1 million tweets within 24 hours for #ALDUBMostAwaitedDate on September 19, 2015.

On October 24, 2015, the couple finally got to meet properly without hindrances through Eat Bulaga!'s grand benefit concert at the Philippine Arena dubbed as "Sa Tamang Panahon" ("At the Right Time"). The concert was part of the show's 36th anniversary and held as a celebration to Eat Bulaga! and a tribute to the fans of AlDub. Proceeds were used to fund libraries for certain schools across the Philippines. That day, the hashtag #ALDubEBTamangPanahon reached over 41 million tweets within 24 hours (which is now the global record for the most number of tweets within 24 hours), beating the record of the 2014 World Cup semi-final match between Brazil and Germany, which consists of 37.6 million tweets within 24 hours. Rishi Jaitly, one of the executives of Twitter said that the tweets were "real, fresh and organic." Apart from social media records, the concert also recorded a live audience of 55,000 people and set another record after tickets for the event sold out in less than 3 days.

== Beginnings ==
In 2015, Alden Richards, who had finished filming the miniseries Ilustrado (2014), was invited to join Eat Bulaga! as a host for a month-long trial period, hosting various segments such as "Pak Na Pak" and later, "That's My Bae" with Indian-Filipino radio disc jockey Sam YG. A month later, Maine Mendoza, who had initially gained popularity for posting Dubsmash videos in various social media platforms, auditioned for the program after catching the attention of its producers. Mendoza officially entered showbiz on July 4, 2015. She recalled that she was originally cast as a lawyer for Eat Bulaga!'s "Juan for All, All for Juan" segment but was ultimately cast as Yaya Dub (Divina Ursula Bokbokova Smash), a personal assistant (although the Filipino term Yaya translate to nanny) for comedian Wally Bayola's Lola Nidora character. Utilizing her Dubsmash popularity, Mendoza only communicates in the series through vocal dubbing and was initially portrayed as the snobbish Yaya Dub. On the show's July 16, 2015 episode, Yaya Dub broke character when she was caught being kilig (a Tagalog word roughly translated in English as "feeling giddy" or much closer with the idiom "tickled pink") seeing Richards on the show's live split screen, prompting Eat Bulaga's producers to make an onscreen couple of the two. On October 1, 2015, their first duet happened when Maine Mendoza and Alden Richards sang "Wish I May", a song by the latter, and "God Gave Me You", a hit song by Bryan White. Mike Tuviera, a resident director for the show, revealed that the tandem was made by accident. The name "AlDub" was conceived as a portmanteau of the tandem's names, Alden and Yaya Dub And despite being featured in the show, the couple did not meet with each other for the first few weeks of the segment and only interacted through the show's split-screen frame and conversing in dubbed audio samples of popular songs and lines from popular films and TV series as well as through handwritten messages shown on screen.

== Kalyeserye ==
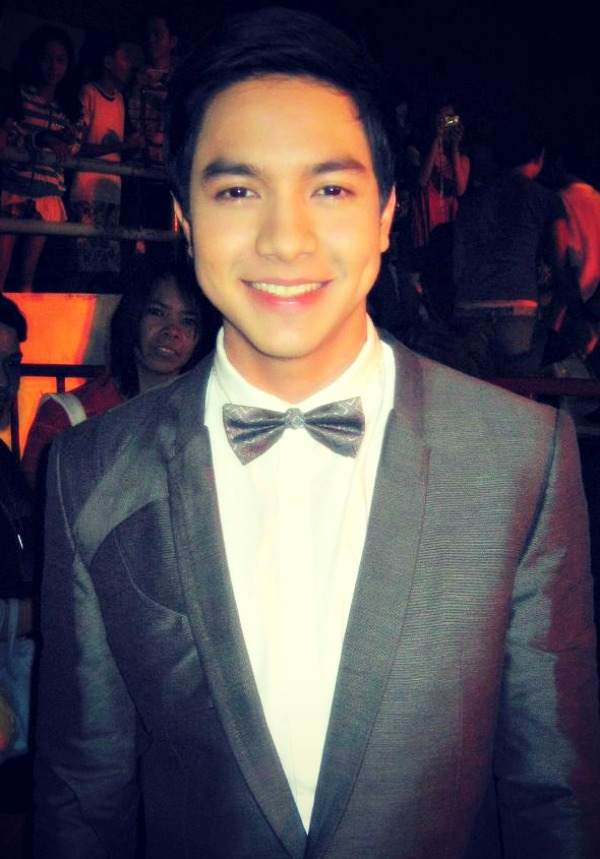
Richards portrays as the male protagonist on AlDub and young version of Anselmo

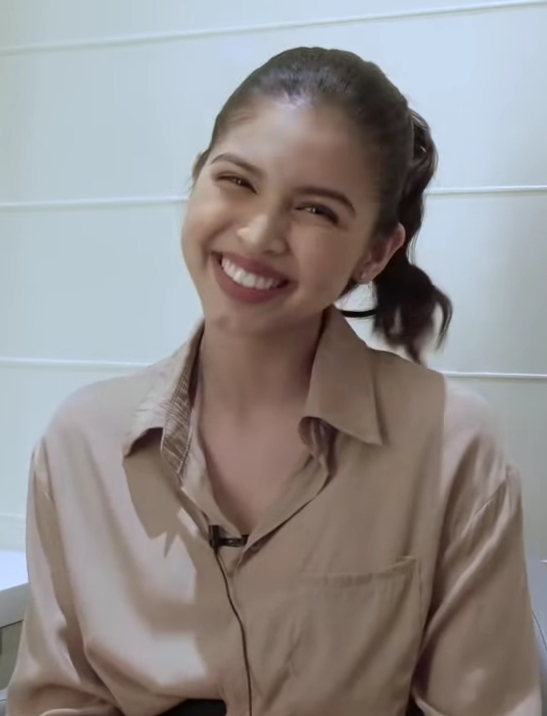
Mendoza portrays as the female protagonist on AlDub and young version of Nidora

Due to the audiences' positive reception to the AlDub pairing, Eat Bulaga!'s producers decided to make a 30-minute soap opera parody in its "Juan For All, All for Juan" segment for the tandem. Pegged as a "Kalyeserye" (Filipino for "street series"), it was described as a parody of Philippine television dramas performed by improv acting, which was broadcast live from a barangay street featured in the "Juan for All, All for Juan" set. Poochie Rivera, one of the program's directors, described it as "natural and unscripted", saying that "Nothing is rehearsed. We are trying to maintain the spontaneity because that is a big part of its charm.". Starring the AlDub love team, the Kalyeserye also features Jose Manalo (as Frankie Arinolli, Tinidora and his various characters), Wally Bayola (as Lola Nidora and his various characters), Paolo Ballesteros (as Tidora and his various characters) and other casts and characters.

Some of the running gags and storylines throughout the parody include the "Pabebe Wave" (a deviation of a beauty queen wave gesture) between Alden and Yaya Dub, Lola Nidora lobbying for a pairing between Yaya Dub and Frankie (using the portmanteau "YaKie"), and the incompetence of the numerous Rogelios, Lola Nidora's bodyguards. The Kalyeserye's main storyline is the Cinderella-like forbidden courtship between the AlDub tandem, with its paramount goal being the first physical meeting between the two, a move continually opposed by Lola Nidora.

=== "Tamang Panahon" ===
On the October 24, 2015 episode of Eat Bulaga!, approximately 55,000 people gathered at the Philippine Arena for a benefit concert that highlighted the love team of Maine Mendoza and Alden Richards. One hundred percent of ticket sales (Php 14 million) was allotted for the AlDub Library Outreach Project. With 41 million in total tweets within 24 hours (39.4 million in 24 hours on October 24 with remaining tweets from the following day considered as counted by Twitter itself), #ALDubEBTamangPanahon, the official hashtag of the event, broke their own Twitter record as well as breaking the global record for the most number of tweets within 24 hours previously held by the 2014 FIFA World Cup semi-final match between Brazil and Germany (which only gained 37.6 million tweets). Their television rating soared, beating the level of the Manny Pacquiao fights, posting 50.8 percent in Mega Manila and 40.1 percent nationwide. This was the only time where Eat Bulaga broadcast the show live and commercial-free.

== Films ==
Beyond Kalyeserye, the AlDub love team has appeared in two films portraying different characters separate from their roles in Kalyeserye.

=== My Bebe Lovefilms ===
Their first feature-length film, titled My Bebe Love, was entered into the 2015 Metro Manila Film Festival and was the top grosser with an opening-day gross of 60.5 million Philippine pesos. By day 5, it had grossed some 214 million pesos On the 10th day of 41st MMFF, the movie had earned P322 million pesos. The total gross of the movie is 385 million pesos.

At the Metro Manila Film Festival awards night, Maine Mendoza won the title of Best Supporting actress.

=== Imagine You and Me ===
On July 13, 2016, three days before the anniversary of AlDub, Imagine You and Me was shown in cinemas worldwide as an anniversary gift to the fans of AlDub. In the film, Richards and Mendoza played as star-crossed lovers with the opposite view of love. A great majority of the film was shot in Italy and the Cinema Evaluation Board of the Philippines gave a B grade. The film grossed over PHP21.5 million on its first day making it the highest-grossing opening day in 2016 to date.

=== Love is... ===
On October 21, 2017, the AlDub love team starred in Eat Bulaga!'s "film made for television" titled Love is..., directed by Adolf Alix, Jr.

"The first ever telemovie that will redefine love, promise, and commitment. The story that will tell us what ‘love is.’"

== Reception ==
The Aldub tandem was described by media pundits as a success in converging both broadcast and social media, as featured in the front page of the Philippine Daily Inquirer for Sunday, August 16, 2015.

The AlDub couple became an overnight phenomenon on both television and social media. The pivotal meeting episode between the AlDub tandem on August 8, 2015 scored a 32% percent rating and a 300% increase in viewership for Eat Bulaga! in the Mega Manila Region, according to the Nielsen ratings conducted by AGB Nielsen Philippines. On a weekly survey by Kantar Media Philippines, the tandem was cited in helping the program to become a number one daytime program for weeks. According to AGB Nielsen's research, Eat Bulaga!'s August 12, 2015 episode marked an all-time high in viewership for the year with a 36.1% rating, in the Mega Manila Region, which was mainly alluded to the tandem's near-meeting. Rivera also theorized that the coupling's successful response from audiences was because of the Filipinos who can relate with their predicament. He remarked "People who have partners who work abroad often communicate and pursue their relationship online, through Skype or FaceTime." Pauleen Luna, a cast member of Eat Bulaga!, commented that AlDub "has brought a different kind of energy to the show." Anna Leah Sarabia, a Filipino anthropologist, cited the "Kalyeserye"'s use of fairy tale and soap opera's tropes helped in tandem's increasing popularity, saying that "It’s a 'Cinderella' story that's fake and true-life at the same time." Filipino television executive Malou Choa-Fagar also cited the unpredictable nature of the Kalyeserye had largely contributed to the AlDub success. In social media site Twitter, hashtags with AlDub became top trending topics in both the Philippine and Worldwide trends. Various outlets also lauded the show's use of old and new media for the AlDub tandem, which also pulsated in raising the value of the Dubsmash app in the Philippines. The popularity of the tandem even reached some schools and became a topic discussed in classrooms; for instance in a University of the Philippines Diliman Filipino class. Several Filipino politicians also referenced the AlDub couple in various interviews: Ralph Recto cited the tandem as a symbolism regarding the Philippine Land Transportation Office license plates, while Mar Roxas also referenced AlDub in his 2016 presidential campaign.

The success of the AlDub tandem also contributed to the careers of Richards and Mendoza. The AlDub's success has helped Richards secure a four-year film contract with APT Entertainment and a recording deal with GMA Records, while the Philippine Basketball Association teams Barangay Ginebra San Miguel, Mahindra Enforcers and Talk N' Text Tropang Texters was also reported to have been considering inviting Mendoza as their muse for the 2015–16 PBA season but she turned down. Mendoza and Richards also appeared in separate profile interviews regarding the AlDub's success on the television program Kapuso Mo, Jessica Soho, Richards also had an episode of his life story on Magpakailanman. Tuviera also revealed in an interview about a possibility of making 2015 feature film starring the AlDub couple. Another report also confirmed that Richards and Mendoza will be part of 41st Metro Manila Film Festival entry My Bebe Love starring Vic Sotto and Ai Ai delas Alas. It also started taping two commercials, for Talk N' Text and McDonald's, they were also awarded the Most Popular Breakout Love Team of the Year, in the recently concluded EdukCircle Awards.

AlDub tandem had granted the request, that they will not endorse any politicians running for the 2016 presidential election in which senator Tito Sotto, one of the main hosts said as per advice from the Eat Bulaga's management.

The two also scored magazine covers due to insistent public demands. The two were featured on YES! Magazine's November 2015 issue and for Preview magazine, Maine on Meg, and Alden for Megaman. The Tres Lolas (JoWaPao) were also featured in another celebrity magazine for the same month.

Below is the list of Eat Bulaga Kalyeserye episodes #AlDub

Name of the show, episodes, date and year listed and company
Title	Episodes	Ratings	Date and year	Company	Ref.
Eat Bulaga; Kalyserye	Yaya Dub meets Alden	21.1%	July 16, 2015	AGB Nielsen	
Eat Bulaga; Kalyserye	On-screen	22.6%	July 18, 2015	AGB Nielsen	
Eat Bulaga; Kalyserye	AlDub PaMore	24.6%	July 28, 2015	AGB Nielsen	
Eat Bulaga; Kalyserye	AlDub to the Rescue	28.1%	August 1, 2015	AGB Nielsen	
Eat Bulaga; Kalyserye	AlDub We Belong Together	32.4%	August 8, 2015	AGB Nielsen	
Eat Bulaga; Kalyserye	AlDub Game of Destiny	31.6%	August 11, 2015	AGB Nielsen	
Eat Bulaga; Kalyserye	AlDub Bulaga pa more!	36.1%	August 12, 2015	AGB Nielsen	
Eat Bulaga; Kalyserye	AlDub For you I will	33.8%	August 15, 2015	AGB Nielsen	
Eat Bulaga; Kalyserye	AlDub Against all odds	39%	August 22, 2015	AGB Nielsen	
Eat Bulaga; Kalyserye	AlDub MiaDen Heaven	34%	August 29, 2015	AGB Nielsen	
Eat Bulaga; Kalyserye	AlDub the Revelation	35.1%	August 31, 2015	AGB Nielsen	
Eat Bulaga; Kalyserye	AlDub Battle for a cause	39.5%	Sept. 5, 2015	AGB Nielsen	
Eat Bulaga; Kalyserye	AlDub the Abduction	36%	Sept. 12, 2015	AGB Nielsen	
Eat Bulaga; Kalyserye	AlDub Most Awaited Date	43.1%	Sept. 19, 2015	AGB Nielsen	
Eat Bulaga; Kalyserye	AlDub EB for Love	45.7%	Sept. 26, 2015	AGB Nielsen	
Eat Bulaga; Kalyserye	AlDub meets TVJ	42.7%	Oct. 3, 2015	AGB Nielsen	
Eat Bulaga; Kalyserye	EB Dabarkads pa more!	40.7%	Oct. 10, 2015	AGB Nielsen	
Eat Bulaga; Kalyserye	AlDub The Big Surprise	38.8%	Oct. 17, 2015	AGB Nielsen	
Eat Bulaga; Kalyserye	AlDub EB "Tamang Panahon"	50.8%	Oct. 24, 2015	AGB Nielsen	

=== Social media ===
From 3.5 million tweets in 24 hours, the AlDub Twitter following grew exponentially, it doubled to 6 million plus on September 5, 2015, doubling further to 12 million on September 19, 2015, and On September 26, 2015, they have reached the highest tweets in Twitter for #ALDubEBforLOVE with 25.6 million tweets in just a day, breaking their own record of 12.1 million tweets within 24 hours for #ALDUBMostAwaitedDate on September 19. Both episodes of the Kalyeserye marked special milestones for the relationship of the AlDub supercouple. They even surpassed the 25.6 million tweets when the two have their #ALDubEBTamangPanahon in the Philippine Arena last October 24, 2015 with a whooping 41 million tweets. Their television rating also went over the roof going to the level of the Manny Pacquiao fights posting a high 45.7 percent in Mega Manila, while Philippine wide rating was at 30.8 percent.

Rishi Jaitly, Twitter's Vice President of Media, Asia Pacific and Middle East, said that AlDub is a global phenomenon. He initially thought that tweets were not authentic but after internally checking it, he concluded that phenomenon is real and not a sideshow.

AlDub has gained the global record for the most tweeter feed in 24 hours. Some sectors has referred to the phenomenon as an example of a black swan event.

=== The "AlDub Nation" fandom ===
Fans of AlDub are commonly referred to as "AlDub Nation", tagging the word nation as it was able to capture three large audiences: overseas workers, people who are often at home (Team Bahay, as they are called), and millennials. Fans have established fan club chapters in the Philippines and abroad. Currently, there are an estimated 43 local chapters within the country, and 44 international chapters from all over the world.

A netizen who goes by his moniker “Don Simoun Ibarra” is one of the sources of Lola Nidora's old pictures, which have garnered thousands of likes and shares on Facebook and Twitter also founded a Twitter-based fan club of working professionals called "AlDub Elite". In an interview with INQUIRER.net, Don Simoun, who chose not to reveal his real identity, admitted that he is a certified “AlDub” fan, and that he is inspired by the series’ hidden message and moral lessons.

The AlDub verified page on Facebook (username: facebook.com/aldenandyayadub) has over 1,000,000 likers; and the fan club with the highest number of followers on Twitter (handle: @MaineAlden16) has over 700,000 followers – numbers which may potentially increase as AlDub's popularity has yet to show signs of waning.

On Saturday (October 24), records were broken when the hashtag #ALDUBEBTamangPanahon resonated all over the world, resulting in 41 million tweets sent. While a lot of tweets came from the Philippines, there was a large number of tweets from the East and West Coasts of the U.S., Japan, Europe, and the Middle East. Two-thirds of all the tweets came from outside of the Philippines.

In an interview from CNN Philippines, it was said that the reason why AlDub-related hashtags work is because of teamwork between different fan clubs on Twitter. There were subgroups which had primary goals such as hashtag trendsetters that sets up hashtags for the day to be used during the show, statistics to monitor tweet counts, hashtag policies that guards the fandom by making sure that they use the correct hashtag and its spelling, and its fandom and character parody accounts that help the fandom to communicate and keep on tweeting.

Eat Bulaga has raised P14 million from ticket sales from the "Tamang Panahon" concert for its library project. Wally Bayola, in character as Lola Nidora, announced this on Saturday during the opening segment of the noontime show. Powered by the AlDub phenomenon with the thrust of AlDub Nation, Eat Bulaga sold out the 55,000-seat Philippine Arena in just three days. The show earlier said it was donating 100 percent of the proceeds from the show to its project which aims to build "AlDub Libraries" at selected schools nationwide. Fans who were unable to buy tickets were also given the opportunity to donate to the project.

Outside of the series, AlDub Nation had also used their hashtags to participate in community service or "bayanihans" and other good deeds. Among them were supporting the campaign to stop lumad killings, gathering donations for a book drive for lumad children, charity concerts for the Mangyans, outreach and feeding programs, and an awareness campaign for dengue prevention.

== Cultural impact ==
=== Sociological analysis ===
On Chika Minute of GMA News' 24 Oras, sociologist Brother Clifford Sorita linked the positive audience reception of the AlDub to the Yaya Dub's Cinderella complex. Sorita says that many can relate to Yaya Dub's situation, portrayed as an ordinary woman who hopes for someone popular or a "prince charming" (Alden Richards) to notice her. Sonita also described that Maine Mendoza, who portrays the character of Yaya Dub as a "diamond in the rough" an ordinary person whose talent and potential maybe discovered through ordinary means. Mendoza was discovered through the internet through her Dubsmash videos.

=== Cultural references ===
The Manila Times in an editorial cartoon depicted that many national issues in the Philippines are being permanently ignored because of the popularity of AlDub, Korean dramas and K-pop in the Philippines.

=== AlDub ends after more than 8 years ===
On May 31, 2023, entertainment news outlet PEP.ph reported Alden Richards and Maine Mendoza (AlDub) have ended after more than 8 years due to Tito, Vic and Joey (TVJ) leaves TAPE Inc. the producer of Eat Bulaga! last May 31, 2023.

== Awards ==
People Asia Magazine hailed Alden Richards and Maine Mendoza as People of the Year 2016. Guinness World Records recognized AlDub as record-breaker in Twitter history for generating 40,706,392 tweets in the "Tamang Panahon" event in Philippine Arena. Here are AlDub's other awards:

Organization	Year	Work / Nominee	Category	Result	Ref.
28th Aliw Awards	2015	Live Performance; Alden Richards with Maine Mendoza	Breakthrough Performers of the Year	Won	
BBC News	2015	AlDub	Social Media Phenomenon	Won	
4th Catholic Social Media Award	2015	Aldub with Lola Nidora in Kalyeserye	Catholic Social Media Award	Won	
Comguild Awards	2017	Alden Richards and Maine Mendoza "Aldub"	Advertiser's Most Admired Loveteam	Won	
Comguild Awards	2020	Alden Richards and Maine Mendoza "Aldub"	Advertiser's Most Admired Loveteam	Won	
EdukCircle Awards	2015	Alden Richards and Maine Mendoza	Most Popular Breakout Loveteam of the Year	Won	
EdukCircle Awards	2016	Aldub in EB's Kalyserye Tamang Panahon	Special Recognition for Phenomenal Act Award	Won	
EdukCircle Awards	2020	Alden Richards	Actor of the Year	Won	
EdukCircle Awards	2020	Alden Richards	Most Influential Celebrities of the Decade	Included	
EdukCircle Awards	2020	Maine Mendoza	Most Influential Celebrities of the Decade	Included	
EdukCircle Awards	2020	Maine Mendoza	Actress of the Year	Won	
EVSU Student Choice Mass Media Awards - Ormoc Campus	2016	Alden Richards and Maine Mendoza	Best Loveteam	Won	
Gawad Lasallianeta	2019	Alden Richards	Most Outstanding Male TV Personality	Nominated	
Gawad Lasallianeta	2019	Maine Mendoza	Most Outstanding Female TV Personality	Nominated	
19th Gawad Pasado Awards	2017	Alden Richards and Maine Mendoza	Gawad Dangal ng Kabataan (Honor Award of the Youth)	Won	
Gawad Tanglaw Awards	2016	Eat Bulaga's Kalyserye	Natatanging Tanglaw ng Kabataan sa Sining ng Telebisyon	Won	
Global Innovative College Innovation Awards for Television	2015	Alden Richards and Maine Mendoza	Most Innovative Television Loveteam	Won	
GMMSF Box Office Entertainment Awards	2016	Alden Richards	Breakthrough Male Star of Philippines Movie and Television	Won	
GMMSF Box Office Entertainment Awards	2016	Maine Mendoza	Breakthrough Female Star of Philippines Movie and Television	Won	
GMMSF Box Office Entertainment Awards	2016	Highest Opening Movie Day Gross of All Time	My Bebe Love #KiligPaMore: 60.4 million	Won	
GMMSF Box Office Entertainment Awards	2016	Highest Record Rating of a Noontime Show of All Time (Local & Global)	Aldub's EB Tamang Panahon with 50.8 ratings on October 24, 2015	Won	
GMMSF Box Office Entertainment Awards	2017	Alden Richards	Prince of Philippine Movies	Won	
GMMSF Box Office Entertainment Awards	2017	Maine Mendoza	Princess of Philippine Movies	Won	
GLOTEL Awards in London	2016	AlDub campaign of Smart Communications’ mainstream market brand TNT	Best Operator Marketing Campaign	Won	
Guinness World Records	2016	#AlDubEBTamangPanahon: Alden and Maine	Most used #hashtag in 24 hours (October 24-25, 2015)	World Record Holder	
Honorary Consulate General of the Philippines, Texas	2017	Alden Richards	Certificate of Appreciation	Honored	
Inside Magazine People's Choice Awards	2017	Alden Richards and Maine Mendoza	Loveteam of the Year	Won	
Inside Magazine People's Choice Awards	2017	Alden Richards	Male Trending Star	Won	
Inside Magazine People's Choice Awards	2017	Maine Mendoza	Female Trending Star	Won	
Metro Manila Film Festival	2015	My BeBeLove #KiligPaMore	Gatpuno J. Villegas Cultural Award	Won	
Metro Manila Film Festival	2015	Alden Richards	Best Supporting Actor	Nominated	
Metro Manila Film Festival	2015	Maine Mendoza	Best Supporting Actress	Won	
MPS Online Awards	2017	Imagine You and Me Soundtrack	Favorite Movie Soundtrack	Won	
Nickelodeon Kids' Choice Awards	2016	Maine Mendoza	Favorite Pinoy TV Personality	Won	
NWSsU Students' Choice Awards for Radio and Television	2016	Alden Richards and Maine	Social Media Phenomenon	Won	
5th OFW Gawad Parangal	2015	Alden Richards and Maine	Most Popular Loveteam	Won	
5th OFW Gawad Parangal	2015	Alden Richards	Favorite Male Young Actor	Won	
People' Asia Magazine	2016	Alden Richards	People of the Year	Won	
People' Asia Magazine	2016	Maine Mendoza	People of the Year	Won	
People' Choice Entertainment Awards	2016	Alden Richards and Maine Mendoza	Most Phenomenal and Most Popular Love Team	Won	
PEP List Awards	2016	Alden Richards and Maine Mendoza	Newsmaker of the Year	Won	
PEP List Awards	2016	Alden Richards and Maine Mendoza	Celebrity Pair of the Year	Won	
PEP List Awards	2017	Alden Richards and Maine Mendoza	Celebrity Pair of the Year	Won	
PEP List Awards	2017	Alden Richards and Maine Mendoza	Newsmaker of the Year	Won	
PEP List Awards	2018	Alden Richards and Maine Mendoza	Celebrity Pair of the Year	Won	
PEP List Awards	2018	Alden Richards and Maine Mendoza	Newsmaker of the Year	Won	
Philippines Walk of Fame	2015	Alden Richards	Walk of Fame Star	Inducted	
Philippines Walk of Fame	2015	Maine Mendoza	Walk of Fame Star	Inducted	
Platinum Stallion Media Award	2016	Alden Richards	Most Valuable Male Endorser	Won	
Platinum Stallion Media Award	2016	Maine Mendoza	Most Valuable Female Endorser	Won	
PMPC Star Awards for Movies	2016	My Bebe Love: #KiligPaMore: Alden and Maine	Movie Loveteam of the Year	Nominated	
PMPC Star Awards for Movies	2016	Alden Richards	Darling Press of the Year	Nominated	
PMPC Star Awards for Movies	2016	Maine Mendoza	New Movie Actress of the Year	Nominated	
PMPC Star Awards for Movies	2017	Imagine You And Me: Alden and Maine	Movie Loveteam of the Year	Nominated	
PMPC Star Awards for Movies	2017	Alden Richards	Movie Actor of the Year	Nominated	
PMPC Star Awards for Movies	2017	Movie Original Theme Song for Imagine You and Me: Alden and Maine, Marivic Sotto and Jimmy Antiporda	Movie Original Theme Song of the Year	Won	
PMPC Star Awards for Movies	2017	Imagine You and Me	Movie of the Year	Nominated	
PMPC Star Awards for Television	2015	Alden Richards and Maine Mendoza	German Moreno's Tandem Award	Won	
PMPC Star Awards for Television	2018	Alden Richards	Best Male TV Host	Won	
PMPC Star Awards for Television	2018	Maine Mendoza	Best Female TV Host	Won	
PUSH Awards	2015	Alden Richards and Maine Mendoza	Favorite Group or Tandem	Nominated	
PUSH Awards	2015	Alden Richards and Maine Mendoza	Most Loved Group or Tandem	Nominated	
12th USTv Students Choice Awards	2016	Alden Richards and Maine Mendoza	Social Media Phenomenon	Won	
Voice Social Media Awards	2017	Alden Richards and Maine Mendoza	Pinoy Pair of the Year	Won	
Voice Social Media Awards	2017	Destined to be Yours	Pinoy Teleserye of the Year	Won	
Voice Social Media Awards	2017	Alden Richards	Hottest Pinoy of the Year	Won	
Voice Social Media Awards	2017	Maine Mendoza	Most Beautiful Pinay of the Year	Won	
Voice Social Media Awards	2017	Maine Mendoza	Pinoy Social Media Icon of the Year	Won	
Yes! Magazine	2016	Alden Richards and Maine Mendoza	100 Most Beautiful Stars	Included	

== See also ==
- List of fictional supercouples
- Notable uses of split-screen
- Korean Wave
