= Yaya Dub =

- Kalyeserye character
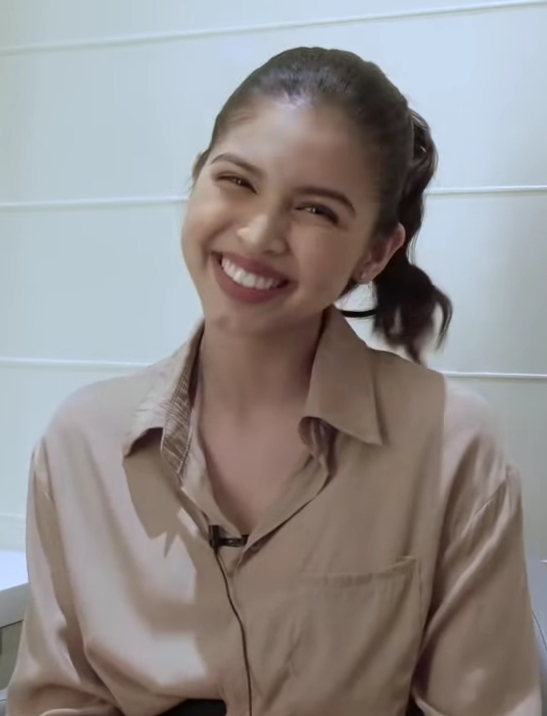
- Mendoza who portrays Yaya Dub in the Kalyeserye portion of Eat Bulaga!
- Created by: Jenny Ferre
- Portrayed by: Maine Mendoza

In-universe information
- Full name: Divina Ursula Bokbokova Smash
- Occupation: personal assistant, nanny
- Family: Teodoro Smash, Caitlyn Smash, Lola Nidora, Lola Tinidora, Lola Tidora
- Spouse: Alden Richards (fictional version)
- Children: 2

Yaya Dub is a fictional character in the Kalyeserye portion of the "Juan for All, All for Juan" segment of Eat Bulaga! played by Maine Mendoza. Yaya Dub who first appeared in the Problem Solving portion of "Juan for All, All for Juan" on July 4, 2015, is the personal assistant or nanny to Lola Nidora (played by Wally Bayola) and the love interest of the fictionalized version of Alden Richards. In the July 16, 2015 episode of Kalyeserye, the love team of Yaya Dub and Alden has been dubbed as AlDub. Yaya Dub as well as other characters of Kalyeserye were created by Jenny Ferre, the creative head of Eat Bulaga! Although the term "Kalyeserye" was coined by Joey de Leon.

== Character background ==
Yaya Dub's full name is Divina Ursula Bokbokova Smash. Her name is a playful acronym for Dubsmash. She first appeared in the Problem Solving portion of "Juan for All, All for Juan" segment of Eat Bulaga! on July 4, 2015, as the snooty personal assistant of Lola Nidora. She initially did not speak and communicated through lip synching songs, popular lines in films or viral videos.

On July 16, 2015, the first episode of Kalyeserye, Yaya Dub and Alden first met through split-screen and the AlDub love team was born. In the same episode, it was first time that Yaya Dub smiled after seeing Alden on the screen.

== In popular culture ==
In the sketch comedy television show Bubble Gang, Yaya Bad, a parody of Yaya Dub, was portrayed by Denise Barbacena. During the peak of the popularity of Yaya Dub in late 2015, the iconic red polka dotted apron of Yaya Dub has been donned in cosplay events and Halloween costume parties. Miss World 2013 Megan Young was one of those celebrities who wore the Yaya Dub costume during Halloween.
