= Dubsmash =

American video sharing social media service

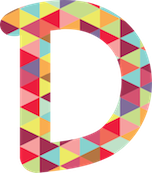
- Original authors: Jonas Drüppel; Roland Grenke; Daniel Taschik
- Developer: Mobile Motion GmbH
- Release: November 14, 2014; 11 years ago – February 22, 2022; 4 years ago
- Operating system: iOS, Android
- Available in: 20 languages
- List of languages: English; Arabic; Dutch; French; German; Hebrew; Hindi; Hungarian; Indonesian; Italian; Japanese; Korean; Malay; Polish; Portuguese; Romanian; Russian; Simplified Chinese; Spanish; Turkish
- Website: www.dubsmash.com

Dubsmash was a video sharing social media service application for iOS and Android.

== Features ==
Dubsmash allowed users to videotape themselves while lip syncing over audio clips and including sections of songs, movies, and famous quotes. Users could upload their own audio and add colour but not filters and text animation to their videos.

Dubsmash was initially seen as a competitor during the development of Instagram Stories by Facebook, according to software engineer Michael Sayman who had worked on the development of Stories.

== History ==
Dubsmash was founded in Germany by Jonas Drüppel, Roland Grenke, and Daniel Taschik, who had previously made two other apps which were not as successful. Their last app prior to Dubsmash was called Starlize, which aimed to allow users to create music videos. Finding out that this app was too complex for users, the creators decided to move on to shorter length videos with an emphasis on ease of use, creating Dubsmash.

Within a week of the launch on November 19, 2014, Dubsmash had reached the number one position in Germany, later reaching the same position in over 29 other countries. As of June 2015 it had been downloaded over 50 million times in 192 countries.

In 2015, Barbadian singer Rihanna had used Dubsmash to tease her song "Bitch Better Have My Money". Later in that year, American singer Selena Gomez used the app on The Tonight Show Starring Jimmy Fallon.

In 2016, the company relocated from Germany to Brooklyn.

In December 2019, the app was downloaded 408,000 times, compared to TikTok's 4.5 million downloads in the same month. In December 2020, that number dropped to 63,000 downloads per month, while TikTok's downloads rose to 4.6 million. 30% of users were posting videos daily, and the app was receiving 1 billion video views per month.

=== Data breach ===
On February 18, 2019, Dubsmash had a data breach; over 162 million accounts were compromised and its database was put for sale on the Dream Market. Passwords were stored as PBKDF2.

=== Acquisition and shutdown ===
On December 13, 2020, Reddit announced that it had acquired Dubsmash.

In 2021, Reddit announced the integration of Dubsmash's tools and technology with Reddit's own video creation features. Reddit announced that the integration would result in the shutdown of the standalone Dubsmash app on February 22, 2022, after which all user videos and posts would be made inaccessible unless downloaded by the user prior. After the shutdown, the dubsmash.com URL was redirected to www.reddit.com and the app is no longer available through the App Store on iOS devices, or the Play Store on Android devices. Reddit created the r/Dubsmash subreddit for users to keep in touch.

== See also ==
- Snapchat
- Musical.ly
- TikTok
- Zynn
