= MNL48 discography =

- EPs: 1
- Singles: 7
- B-sides: 12
- Music videos: 11

The discography of MNL48 consists of seven singles. The A-side (main) song is performed by a special member selection called the senbatsu (Japanese: 選抜; "selection"). Each team are given one song per single, which they have to audition to get it. The songs are covers of the Japanese songs originally recorded by AKB48, the sister group of MNL48 with the Japanese lyrics translated into Filipino.

== Singles ==
=== As Lead Artists ===
| No. | Title | Details |
|---|---|---|
| 1 | "Aitakatta" | Released: August 17, 2018; Format: Digital download, streaming; Label: Star Music |
| 2 | "Pag-Ibig Fortune Cookie" | Released: November 25, 2018; Format: Digital download, streaming; Label: Star Music |
| 3 | "365 Araw ng Eroplanong Papel" | Released: April 11, 2019; Format: Digital download, streaming; Label: Star Music |
| 4 | "Ikaw ang Melody" | Released: November 22, 2019; Format: Digital download, streaming; Label: Star Music |
| 5 | "High Tension" | Released: February 19, 2020; Format: Digital download, streaming; Label: Star Music |
| 6 | "River" | Released: November 28, 2020; Format: Digital download, streaming; Label: HalloHallo Entertainment |
| 7 | "No Way Man" | Released: April 1, 2022; Format: Digital download, streaming; Label: HalloHallo Entertainment, Universal Records |
| 8 | "Summertime" | Released: June 12, 2024; Format: Digital download, streaming; Label: HalloHallo Entertainment |
| 9 | "Oh My Pumpkin!" | Released: August 13, 2025; Format: Digital download, streaming; Label: MNL48, Inc. (Independent) |

=== As featured artist ===
| Title | Year | Album |
|---|---|---|
| "Dalawang Pag-ibig Niya" (with Krystal Brimner and Sheena Belarmino) | 2018 | Himig Handog 2018 |
| "Wonderful Moments " (with AJ Colico, Dylan Burton, and Francis Adaya) | 2025 | Wokderful Moments Music Festival |

=== Senbatsu history ===
Team:
Team MII
Team NIV
Team L
Team Unknown
Kenkyuusei
Graduated

| Singles | | 1st | 2nd | 3rd | 4th | 5th | 6th | 7th | 8th |
|---|---|---|---|---|---|---|---|---|---|
| Center(s) | | Sheki | Sheki | Sheki | Aly | Gabb | Abby | Abby | Cole |
| Center(s) | | Sheki | Sheki | Sheki | Aly | Gabb | Gabb | Abby | Cole |
| Member | Rank | Center Position | | | | | | | |
| Sheki | 2nd | Center | | | Senbatsu | | | | |
| Aly | —N/a | | | | Center | Senbatsu | | | |
| Gabb | —N/a | Senbatsu | | | Senbatsu | Center | | | |
| Abby | 1st | Senbatsu | | | | | Center | | |
| Cole | 17th | | | | | Senbatsu | | | Center |
| Member | Rank | Senbatsu Participation | | | | | | | |
| Sela | —N/a | Senbatsu | | | | | | | |
| Tin | 16th | Senbatsu | | | | | | | |
| Alice | —N/a | Senbatsu | | | Senbatsu | | | | |
| Ella | 5th | Senbatsu | | | | | Senbatsu | | |
| Ash | —N/a | Senbatsu | | | Senbatsu | | | | |
| Jem | 8th | Senbatsu | | | | | | Senbatsu | |
| Sayaka | —N/a | Senbatsu | | Senbatsu | | | | | |
| Faith | —N/a | Senbatsu | | | | | | | |
| Lara | 13th | Senbatsu | | | | | | Senbatsu | |
| Grace | —N/a | Senbatsu | | | Senbatsu | | | | |
| Quincy | —N/a | Senbatsu | | | | | | | |
| Alyssa | —N/a | Senbatsu | | | | | | | |
| Erica | —N/a | Senbatsu | | | | | | | |
| Brei | —N/a | | Senbatsu | | | | Senbatsu | | |
| Belle | —N/a | | Senbatsu | | | Senbatsu | | | |
| Coleen | 14th | | Senbatsu | | | | Senbatsu | | |
| Rans | —N/a | | Senbatsu | | | | | | |
| Lei | —N/a | | Senbatsu | | | | | | |
| Mari | 34th | | Senbatsu | | | | | | |
| Jan | —N/a | | Senbatsu | | Senbatsu | | Senbatsu | | |
| Kay | —N/a | | Senbatsu | | | Senbatsu | | | |
| Ruth | —N/a | | | Senbatsu | | | | Senbatsu | |
| Dana | 18th | | | Senbatsu | | | | Senbatsu | |
| Dian | 19th | | | Senbatsu | | Senbatsu | | Senbatsu | |
| Jamie | 3rd | | | | Senbatsu | | | | |
| Kyla | —N/a | | | | Senbatsu | | | | |
| Rowee | —N/a | | | | Senbatsu | | | | |
| Thea | —N/a | | | | Senbatsu | | | | |
| Laney | —N/a | | | | | Senbatsu | | | |
| Yzabel | 9th | | | | | Senbatsu | | Senbatsu | |
| Yssa | —N/a | | | | | Senbatsu | | | |
| Amy | 27th | | | | | | Senbatsu | | Senbatsu |
| Frances | 23rd | | | | | | Senbatsu | | Senbatsu |
| Gia | 22nd | | | | | | Senbatsu | | |
| Jaydee | —N/a | | | | | | Senbatsu | | |
| Andi | 7th | | | | | | | Senbatsu | |
| Princess | 12th | | | | | | | Senbatsu | |
| Rianna | 33rd | | | | | | | Senbatsu | |
| Lyza | 35th | | | | | | | Senbatsu | |
| Charm | 39th | | | | | | | | Senbatsu |
| CJ | 48th | | | | | | | | Senbatsu |
| Kath | 26th | | | | | | | | Senbatsu |
| Klaire | 31st | | | | | | | | Senbatsu |
| Klaryle | 28th | | | | | | | | Senbatsu |
| Rachel | 45th | | | | | | | | Senbatsu |
| Rhea | 44th | | | | | | | | Senbatsu |

== Charted Songs ==
=== A-side Single ===
| Title | Year | Peak chart positions | | | | | Sales | Certifications | Album |
| Title | Year | Philippines | | | | | Sales | Certifications | Album |
| Title | Year | Myx Hit Chart | Pinoy Myx Countdown | Myx Daily Top 10: Pinoy Edition | Myx Daily Top 10 | iTunes PH Top 100 Albums | Sales | Certifications | Album |
|---|---|---|---|---|---|---|---|---|---|
| Aitakatta – Gustong Makita | 2018 | 7 | 5 | 5 | — | 1 | —N/a | —N/a | Aitakatta |
| Pag-ibig Fortune Cookie | 2018 | 2 | 1 | 1 | 2 | 1 | PHL: 250,000+ | PARI: Gold & Platinum | Pag-ibig Fortune Cookie |
| 365 Araw ng Eroplanong Papel | 2019 | 5 | 3 | — | 4 | 1 | —N/a | —N/a | 365 Araw ng Eroplanong Papel |
| Ikaw ang Melody | 2019 | 8 | 4 | — | 7 | 2 | —N/a | —N/a | Ikaw ang Melody |
| High Tension | 2020 | 2 | 2 | — | 2 | 5 | —N/a | —N/a | High Tension |
| River | 2020 | 3 | 1 | — | 2 | 2 | —N/a | —N/a | River |
| No Way Man | 2022 | 1 | 1 | — | 1 | 5 | —N/a | —N/a | No Way Man |
| Summertime | 2024 | — | — | — | — | 5 | —N/a | —N/a | Summertime |
| Oh My Pumpkin | 2025 | — | — | — | — | 2 | —N/a | —N/a | Oh My Pumpkin |

=== Other charted songs ===
| Title | Year | Peak chart positions | | | | Sales | Certifications | Album |
| Title | Year | Philippines | | | | Sales | Certifications | Album |
| Title | Year | Myx Hit Chart | Pinoy Myx Countdown | Myx Daily Top 10: Pinoy Edition | Myx Daily Top 10 | Sales | Certifications | Album |
|---|---|---|---|---|---|---|---|---|
| Talulot ng Sakura | 2018 | 2 | 2 | 2 | — | —N/a | —N/a | Aitakatta |
| Palusot Ko'y Maybe | 2019 | 3 | 2 | — | 2 | —N/a | —N/a | Pag-ibig Fortune Cookie |
| Igai ni Mango | 2019 | — | — | — | — | —N/a | —N/a | 365 Araw ng Eroplanong Papel |
| Gingham Check | 2019 | 13 | 7 | — | — | —N/a | —N/a | Ikaw Ang Melody |

=== Myx Live! Performances ===
| Title | Year | Peak chart positions | | | |
| Title | Year | Philippines | | | |
| Title | Year | Myx Hit Chart | Pinoy Myx Countdown | Myx Daily Top 10 | Myx Most Viewed |
|---|---|---|---|---|---|
| Time After Time | 2020 | 2 | 1 | 2 | 4 |
| Ikaw ang Melody | 2020 | — | — | — | 8 |
| Palusot Ko'y Maybe | 2020 | — | — | — | 10 |
| 365 Araw ng Eroplanong Papel | 2020 | — | — | — | — |

== Music videos ==
=== As lead artist ===
| Year | Title | Director(s) | Notes | Ref. |
|---|---|---|---|---|
| 2018 | Aitakatta – Gustong Makita | Sho Makino | First single | |
| 2018 | Talulot ng Sakura | Tetsuya Hashi | B-side | |
| 2018 | Pag-ibig Fortune Cookie | Unknown | Second single | |
| 2018 | Amazing Grace (My Chains Are Gone) | Unknown | Gospel project | |
| 2019 | Palusot Ko’y Maybe | Carlo Francisco Manatad | Team NIV | |
| 2019 | 365 Araw ng Eroplanong Papel | Carlo Francisco Manatad | Third single | |
| 2019 | Igai ni Mango | Zeph Burgos | Team L | |
| 2019 | Ikaw Ang Melody | Peewee Gonzales | Fourth single | |
| 2019 | Gingham Check | Zeph Burgos | Undergirls | |
| 2020 | High Tension | Miko Pelino | Fifth single | |
| 2020 | River | Miko Pelino | Sixth single | |
| 2020 | Hashlove | Mia D'Bayan | First original song | |
| 2021 | Sampung Taon ng Sakura | Mia D'Bayan | Documentary video | |
| 2022 | No Way Man | Miko Pelino | Seventh single | |

=== As featured artist ===
| Year | Title | Director(s) | Notes | Ref. |
|---|---|---|---|---|
| 2018 | Dalawang Pag-ibig Niya (with Krystal Brimner and Sheena Belarmino) | Frank Lloyd Mamaril | Himig Handog 2018 entry. | |

== Filmography ==
=== Film ===
| Year | Title | Participating member(s) | Director(s) | Notes | Ref(s) |
|---|---|---|---|---|---|
| 2019 | ICYMI: I See Me | All MNL48 1st generation members | Carlo Francisco Manatad | MNL48 1st generation documentary | |
| 2020 | Seikimatsu Blue | Abby, Kay, Coleen, and Brei | Tetsuya Hashi | First international Film based in Japan | |
| 2021 | Kun Maupay Man It Panahon (Whether the Weather is Fine) | Rans (Main Cast) Sheki, Sela, Dian, Ella (Cameo) | Carlo Francisco Manatad | First local mainstream movie, featuring an MNL48 member. W/ Daniel Padilla and Charo Santos | |

=== Television ===
| Year | Title | Network | Notes |
|---|---|---|---|
| 2018–2026 | It's Showtime | ABS-CBN (2018–2020); A2Z/Kapamilya Channel (2020–2026); ALLTV/GMA Network (2024–2026) | MNL48 segment and recurring musical guests. |
| 2018–2026 | Letters and Music | Net 25 | Guest |
| 2018–2026 | ASAP | ABS-CBN (2018–2020); A2Z/Kapamilya Channel (2020–2026); TV5 (2021–2025); ALLTV (2026) | Musical guests with various lineup. |
| 2018–2026 | iWant ASAP | ABS-CBN (2018–2020); A2Z/Kapamilya Channel (2020–2026); TV5 (2021–2025); ALLTV (2026) | Musical guests with various lineup. |
| 2018–2020 | Umagang Kay Ganda | ABS-CBN | Musical guests with various lineup. |
| 2019 | Warrior ANGEL with Brenda Domato | Inquirer 990 Television; Radyo Inquirer | Guest (Note: Lineup: Team MII (Alice, Essel); Team NIV (Daryll, Ecka); and Team L (Dian). Aired on January 19, 2019.) |
| 2019 | Showbiz FM with MJ Marfori | One PH; Radyo5 | Guest (Note: Lineup: Team MII (Sheki); Team NIV (Abby); and Team L (Sela). Aired on March 9, 2019.) |
| 2019 | Hado Pilipinas | ABS-CBN S+A | Musical Guests (Note: Gingham Check Undergirls Lineup: Team MII (Emz); and Team NIV (Alyssa, Belle, Brei, Coleen, Lara, Miho, Ruth). Aired on October 18, 2019.) |
| 2019 | MYXed Lives | Myx | Guest. (Note: Aired on October 26, 2019) |
| 2019 | Matanglawin | ABS-CBN | Guest (Note: Lineup: Team NIV (Coleen, Joyce); Team L (Gabb); and Kenkyuuseii (Karla). Aired on October 27, 2019.) |
| 2019 | Banana Sundae | ABS-CBN | Musical Guests (Note: Gingham Check Undergirls Lineup: Team MII (Cess, Emz); Team NIV (Alyssa, Belle, Brei, Coleen, Lara, Miho, Ruth); and Team L (Dian, Kay, Mari, Tin, Yssa). Aired on November 17, 2019.) |
| 2019 | Family is Forever: The 2019 ABS-CBN Christmas Special | ABS-CBN | Opening performance with Vice Ganda. (Note: Aired on December 14, 2019.) |
| 2019 | MYX Live! Performance | Myx | Guest (Note: Lineup: Team MII (Faith, Rans, Sheki); Team NIV (Belle, Ecka); and Team L (Gabb, Lei, Sela). Aired on December 19, 2019.) |
| 2019 | 70th NHK Kōhaku Uta Gassen | NHK (Japan) | Abby as representative for MNL48 with AKB48 Group (Note: Aired on December 31, 2019.) |
| 2020 | OMJ | DZMM TeleRadyo | Guest (Note: Lineup: Team MII (Cole, Yzabel); Team NIV (Aly); and Team L (Dian, Kay). Aired on February 22, 2020.) |
| 2020 | Magandang Buhay | ABS-CBN | Musical Guests. (Note: High Tension Senbatsu Lineup: Team MII (Alice, Cole, Jamie, Laney, Rans, Sheki, Yzabel); Team NIV (Abby, Aly, Belle, Coleen); and Team L (Dian, Gabb, Kay, Sela, Yssa). Aired on March 9, 2020.) |
| 2020 | Team FitFil | Kapamilya Channel | Guest (Note: Lineup: Team NIV (Abby); and Team L (Gabb). Aired on October 17, 2020.) |
| 2020 | Pinoy Big Brother: Connect | A2Z/Kapamilya Channel | Opening Musical Guest (Note: Lineup: Team MII (Jamie, Sheki); Team NIV (Abby, Belle, Brei, Coleen); and Team L (Gabb, Sela). Aired on December 6, 2020.) |
| 2020 | Ikaw ang Liwanag at Ligaya: The 2020 ABS-CBN Christmas Special | A2Z/Kapamilya Channel | Opening performance with Gary Valenciano (Note: Lineup: Team MII (Jamie, Jan, Sheki); Team NIV (Brei); and Team L (Ella, Frances, Gabb).) |
| 2021 | Magandang Buhay | A2Z/Kapamilya Channel | Guest (Note: Lineup: Team MII (Jamie, Sheki); Team NIV (Abby, Brei, Coleen); and Team L (Amy, Frances, Gabb). Aired on January 14, 2021. Replay on April 8, 2021.) |
| 2021 | I Can See Your Voice (season 3) | A2Z/Kapamilya Channel | Guest (Note: Lineup: Team MII (Alice, Jamie, Laney, Sheki); Team NIV (Abby, Coleen, Jaydee); and Team L (Gabb). Aired on January 24, 2021.) |
| 2021 | I Feel U | Cinema One; Jeepney TV; Myx | Guest (Note: Lineup: Third Generation Kami 7 (Abby, Sheki, Jamie, Ruth, Ella, Jan, and Andi. Aired on March 22, 2021 on Cinema One. Aired on March 27, 2021 on Jeepney TV.) |
| 2021 | Game Ka Na Ba? | Jeepney TV | MNL48 Jem as guest (Note: Simulcast on Kumu dated July 5, 2021.) |
| 2021 | Sakto | Kapamilya Channel; TeleRadyo | Guest (Note: Lineup:Cole, Dana, Jem, Ruth, and Yzabel. Aired on October 13, 2021.) |
| 2021 | We Rise Together | Kapamilya Channel; Jeepney TV | Guest (Note: Lineup: Andi, Cole, Dana, Dian, Klaire, Miho, Ruth, and Yzabel. Aired on Jeepney TV dated October 16, 2021; Aired on Kapamilya Channel dated October 17, 2021.) |
| 2022 | Rated Korina | A2Z/Kapamilya Channel; One PH; TV5 | Guests (Note: Aired on A2Z, Kapamilya Channel, and TV5 dated April 2, 2022; Aired on One PH dated April 3, 2022.) |
| 2022 | Pinoy Big Brother: Kumunity Season 10 | A2Z/Kapamilya Channel; Jeepney TV | Houseguests (Note: Lineup: Coleen, Ella, and Jem. Aired April 28, 2022. Lineup:No Way Man Senbatsu. Aired on April 30, 2022) |
| 2022 | Magandang Buhay | A2Z/Kapamilya Channel | Guest (Note: Lineup: Abby, Andi, Ella, Jan, Jamie, Jem, Ruth, and Sheki. Aired on May 3, 2022.) |
| 2022 | I Can See Your Voice (season 4) | A2Z/Kapamilya Channel | Guest (Note: Lineup: Abby, Coleen, Dana, Dian, Ella, Lara, Princess, Sheki, Yzabel. Aired on May 21, 2022.) |
| 2022 | Barangay PIE | PIE | Guest (Note: Lineup: Abby (host), Coleen, Ella, Lara, Lyza, Princess, Sheki, Yzabel. Aired on July 31, 2022.) |
| 2022 | TikTok for You Stage (Powered by Oppo) | RCTI (Indonesia) | Opening performance with JKT48 (Note: JKT48 lineup (as host): Adel, Ashel, Chika, Christy, Feni, Fiony, Flora, Freya, Gracia, Jessi, Jinan, Marsha, Muthe, Shani, Sisca, Zee; and MNL48 lineup (as guest): Abby, Amy, Cole, Coleen, Dana, Dian, Ella, Jamie, Jem, Klaryle, Lara, Mari, Miho, Rianna, Sheki, Yzabel. Simulcast on Official TikTok Account of TikTok Indonesia dated October 29, 2022.) |
| 2025 | Kada Umaga | Net 25 | Guests |
| 2025 | Gud Morning Kapatid | RPTV/TV5 | Guests |
| 2025 | Rise and Shine Pilipinas | IBC/PTV | Guests |
| 2025 | All Out Sundays | GMA Network | Guests |
| 2025 | TiktoClock | GMA Network | Guests |
| 2025 | Family Feud | GMA Network | Contestants (Note: Dana, Jamie, Rachel, and Rhea) |
| 2026 | Vibe | Kapatid Channel/One PH/TV5 | Guests, last performance before their dissolution. |

=== Web ===
| Year | Title | Participating Members | Notes |
|---|---|---|---|
| 2017–2018 | MNL48 Online Update | Themselves | News program dedicated to MNL48. |
| 2018 | MNLife | Themselves | First variety show. |
| 2018 | MNLaugh | Themselves | Second variety show. |
| 2018 | MNL48 I-School | Themselves | Third variety show. |
| 2018 | MNL48 Christmas Special | Themselves | Christmas show. |
| 2018 | MNL48 New Year Special | Themselves | Year-end show. |
| 2019 | MNL48 Interactive Live | Themselves | Talk show where all of its members are assigned as hosts for the day. |
| 2019–2026 | MNL48 KUMU Live Interaction | Themselves | Talk show where all of its members are assigned as hosts for the day via Kumu livestream application. |
| 2020 | Kapamilya Chat: MNL48 Ecka and Sela | Ecka and Sela | |
| 2020 | MNL48 Presents: 2020 Vision | Ecka, Sela, and Sheki | First MNL48 Presents short |
| 2020 | MNL48 Presents: Chain | Daryll, Jamie, and Jaydee | Four-part web series. |
| 2020 | MNL48 Presents: Bye, Us | Jem, Dana, Ella, and Gia | Four episode limited series |
| 2020 | MNL48 Presents: Pranks Not Dead | Alice, Andi, Coleen, Dian, and Jan | |
| 2021 | CinemaOne Pop Cinema | Abby, Gabb, and Jamie | |
| 2021 | It's Showtime Online U | All Third General Election Candidates | week-long interview with It's Showtime Online U hosts and Third General Election Result (Day 1 and 2) |
| 2021 | MNL48 Third Generation Virtual Conference | Third Gen Kami 7 and new members | Post-election interview with MJ Felipe |
| 2021 | We Rise Together | Third Generation Senbatsu | |
| 2021 | Kapamilya Chat: MNL48 Third Generation | Third Generation Kami 7 | |
| 2021 | I Feel U | Third Generation Kami 7 | Interview with Toni Gonzaga-Soriano |
| 2021 | CinemaOne Pop Cinema | Dana, Jem, and Miho | |
| 2022 | By Request 3 | Abby, Andi, Coleen, Ella, Jem, Lara, Sheki, and Yzabel | |
| 2022 | Star Magic Game Zone | Cole, Frances, Gia, Jie, and Klaryle | |
| 2022 | OKM: P-pop Hangout | Coleen, Dana, and Dian | |
| 2022 | Tiktok Awards Philippines | Abby, Coleen, Dana, Ella, Lara, Princess, Sheki | Guest performer and recipient |
| 2022 | Star Magic Lounge | Abby, Cole, Coleen, Dana, Frances, Sheki | |
| 2022 | Bahay ni Kumu | Coleen, Ella, Jem | |
| 2023 | MNL48 Game Time | Themselves | |

== Commercials and endorsements ==
| Year | Product/project | Producer | Ref. |
|---|---|---|---|
| 2023 | Bangong Nakakagigil Hair for Smoother Dance Moves | Sunsilk | |
