= Ai dela Cruz =

Filipino television host and video jockey (born 1991)

- Born: June 22, 1991 (age 35)
- Education: University of the Philippines Diliman
- Occupations: Television host, video jockey
- Years active: 2013–present
- Employer: Myx
- Agent: Star Magic

Ai dela Cruz (born June 22, 1991) is a Filipino television host and video jockey. She is best known as a longtime Myx VJ, having joined the music channel in 2013. She has hosted several Myx programs and other entertainment and corporate events, and has also worked as a courtside reporter and television host.

== Early life and education ==
Dela Cruz was born on June 22, 1991. She studied Broadcast Communication at the University of the Philippines Diliman. She was also involved in basketball and worked as a courtside reporter before joining Myx.

== Career ==
Dela Cruz joined Myx in 2013, when the channel introduced her alongside Sam Concepcion and Karla Aguas as part of its new group of video jockeys. At the time, she was described as a former NCAA and PBA courtside reporter and a recent Broadcast Communication graduate of the University of the Philippines Diliman. As a Myx VJ, Dela Cruz hosted programs including Myx Daily Top 10, Wer U At?, Pop Myx, Pinoy Myx, and My Myx.

She continued to appear on Myx programs and hosted music-related events, including the Myx Music Awards. In 2017, she was among the hosts of the Myx Music Awards, alongside Robi Domingo, Tippy dos Santos, Donny Pangilinan, Sunny Kim, Jairus Aquino, and Sharlene San Pedro. Dela Cruz was also among the hosts of the Myx Music Awards 2020, which was held virtually amid the COVID-19 pandemic.

Following the ABS-CBN shutdown and subsequent retrenchment of employees in 2020, Dela Cruz was among the Myx VJs shown with fellow VJs during the channel's announcement regarding its reduced workforce. Myx stated that the majority of its staff and VJs had been retrenched, while the channel continued operating with a smaller team through cable, online, and social media platforms.

Despite the retrenchment, Dela Cruz continued to appear in Myx shows. In September 2020, she hosted the Myx Presents: Ebe Dancel Digital Concert, a livestream featuring singer-songwriter Ebe Dancel.

In 2021, Dela Cruz became the host of Myx and Match, a dating game show launched by Myx during the pandemic. She served as the first "searcher" in the program's premiere episode in April 2021.

== Television ==
Year	Title	Role	Ref.
Before 2013	NCAA basketball coverage	Courtside reporter	
Before 2013	PBA coverage	Courtside reporter	
2013–2016, 2019–2021	Myx Daily Top 10	Video jockey/host	
2013–2017	Myx Wer U At?	Video jockey/host	
2013–2017	Myx Movie Date	Video jockey/host	
2013–2021	My Myx	Video jockey/host	
2013–2021	Pinoy Myx	Video jockey/host	
2013–2021	Pop Myx	Video jockey/host	
2013–2020	Pinoy Myx Countdown	Video jockey/host	
2013–2020	Myx Music Awards	Video jockey/host	
2015	Mornings @ ANC	Anchor	
2016–2018	Myx Daily Top 10: Pinoy Edition	Video jockey	
2021–2025	Myx and Match	Host	
2021	Let's Stan	Host	
2022–2023	Coke Studio Philippines	Host	
2025	Beautiful Day	Guest	
2026	TV Patrol Express	Patroller	
