= List of programs broadcast by Myx =

This is a list of programs broadcast by Myx Global, a global music television channel owned by ABS-CBN Corporation. Since its launch in 2000, Myx is notable for showing lyrics on music videos which was adapted from karaoke, a popular pastime in Asia and has aired a variety of music-related programming, including chart countdowns, music video blocks, live performances, artist interviews, and lifestyle and entertainment shows. Following the merging of Myx Philippines and Myx Global in 2021, the channel's programming has expanded to serve audiences across multiple international feeds, including the Philippines, the United States, Guam, and the Middle East. This list includes both current and former programs broadcast by Myx.

Logo of Myx since 2021

== Current programming ==
=== Variety and talk shows ===
Title	Premiere date	Current season	Source(s)
Myxclusives	2022		
Myx Hits Different	September 2022	3	
The Ripple	March 20, 2024	2	
Myx Now	September 1, 2025	2	
Myx Recess	June 2026	1	
Myx Olympics	July 2026	1	
Fresh Content on Myx	July 2026		
Myx Eats	July 2026		

=== Music and performance shows ===
- Island Block Party (2021–present)
- Myx Live! (September 2022–present)
- Myx Presents: The Music Room
- Myx Press Play (2021–present)
- The OPM Hour

=== Documentary shows ===
- Fil Am Creatives: Reach Out (July 2026–present)
- Filgrimage
- Making It In America (2021–present)
- Making It In Canada
- My Motto (2017–present)
- Off The Record (September 2026–present)
- Sony: Behind The Music (September 2026–present)
- The Wrizzards (April 18, 2026–present)
- Artist's Notes (August 23, 2026–present)

=== Sitcom ===
- The Nutshack (2007–present)

=== Special shows ===
- Bini x BGYO USA Adventures
- Booked
- Eurovision Song Contest Asia (November 14, 2026–present)
- One Dream
- Masskara Festival

== Former programming ==
=== Music and performance shows ===
- #LoveOnMyx
- American Chart Show
- AniMyx
- Asia Myx
- Beat U.K. (2001)
- Club Myx
- Cyber Myx (2016–2021)
- Dance Myx
- First Seen on Myx
- Inkigayo (2015)
- Kantabataan (2007)
- Kwentong Barber (2021–2022)
- Late Night Myx
- Living For The Music
- Mellow Myx (2002–2021)
- Morning Myx (2002–2005)
- My Myx (2002–2020)
- Myx and Match (2021)
- Myx Back2Back
- Myx Backtrax (2002–2021)
- Myx Bandarito
- Myx Concerts
- Myx Daily Top 10 (2002–16, 2018–25)
- Myx Daily Top 10: International Edition (2016–18)
- Myx Daily Top 10: Pinoy Edition (2016–18)
- Myx Firsts
- Myx Hit Chart (2002–26)
- Myx Homecoming
- Myx International Top 20 (2007–2026)
- Myx Mo!
- Myx Mobile Top Picks
- Myx Moods (2015–2021)
- Myx Most Viewed
- Myx Moves Street Dance Competition (2016–2017)
- Myx Premiere (2002–2021)
- Myx Recall (2000–2002)
- Myx Remakes (2002–2005)
- Myx Sa Dos (2002–2003)
  - Myx Sa Dos: F4 Edition
- Myx Sampler
- Myx Setlist
- Myx Spotlight
- Myx Studio Sessions (2015–2016)
- Myx Suburbia (2001)
- Myx Sure-Fire Hits
- Myx Take 5 (2002–2021)
- Myx Throwback (2015–2019)
- Myx Traks (2024)
- Myx Tugtugan (2007)
- Myx TV Top 10 (2011–2012)
- Myx Versions (2005–2021)
- Myxed Lives (2016–2020)
- Myxtreme (2001)
- New Music
- OPM Myx (2002–2009)
- OPM Myx Countdown (2002–2005)
- Pinoy Myx (2009–2021)
- Pinoy Myx Breakout (2019–2020)
- Pinoy Myx Countdown (2005–2026)
- Pinoy Rock Myx
- Pop My Myx
- Pop Myx (2001–2021)
  - Pop Myx: K-Pop Edition (2010–2015)
  - Pop Myx The Late Night Show (2013–2014)
- Radio Myx
- Red Hot Myx
- Rhum on the Rock
- Rock Myx (2001–2019)
- Soundcheck
- Star Myx (2002–2021)
- Tanduay's First Five (2011)
- Urban Myx (2001)
- Top of the Pops
- Whatever

=== Documentary shows ===
- 100 Days Miracle (2023)
- Clocked Out (2025–2026)
- Crossover Conversations
- Discovering Routes (2018–present)
- Dyan Banda (2006)
- Hustle With Purpose (2020)
- K-Pop Incubation (2015)
- Making of... The Band
- Making It In Canada (2021–2022)
- Myx Adventures
- Myx 15 Documentary (2015)
- Myxposed
- One Music Be Discovered
- Pia's Postcards (2022)
- The Crossover (–2026)

=== Variety and talk shows ===
- Bagged (2014–2015)
- Click Like Share (2022)
- Eat Your Words (2014–2015)
- Fresh Take (2021–22)
- I Feel U (2020)
- Let's Stan!
- Myx 3 On 3
- Myx Ambushed
- Myx Checks In (2026)
- Myx Forum
- Myx Halo-Halo (2014)
- Myx Headliner
- Myx Movie Date (2013–2017)
- Myx News (2005–2019/2022)
  - Myx News Minute
- Myxellaneous
- Myxilog (2005–2009)
- New Energy
- Planet Rock Profiles
- Player's Club
- Rise and Shine (2020)
- Slay Model Search Asia (2023)
- That Guy Slater (2022)
- The Lunch Table (2021–2022)
- The People's Queen (2019)
- We Rise Together
- Wer U At? (2016–)

=== Reality shows ===
- Call to Cosplay (2014–2022)
- Dream Maker (2022–2023)
- Hello K-Idol (2018)
- I'm Asian American and... on April 23, 2014.
- Who Is Princess? (2021–2022)
- Mom vs. Matchmaker (2015–2017)
- Ramyun and Chill (2023)
- Time To Dance (2025)
- World of Dance season 1 (2022)

=== Drama ===
- Till I Met You (2021)

=== Movie block ===
- Shiver and Shake (2015)
- Myx Box Office (2020–2022)

=== Acquired shows ===
- Music Bank (2012)
- Supermodel Me (2014)
- The Kitchen Musical (2014)
- Unbeatable Banzuke (2013)
- Voltron (2011)

=== Special shows ===
- 24X24 (2020–2021)
- Adele: One Night Only (2021)
- Billboard Music Awards (2016)
- Eurovision Song Contest Asia 2026: Philippine Selection Night (2026)
- iTunes Festival (2013–2014)
- Mnet Asian Music Awards (2015, 2017)
- Myx Christmas (2015–2016)
- MyxAdventures London 2015 (2015)
- Myx Halloween Special
  - Rest House (2010)
  - Singsing (2011)
  - Kadena (2012)
  - Diary (2013)
  - Kwintas (2017)
- Myx Music Awards
- Myx VJ Search
  - Myx VJ Search 2007 (2007)
  - Myx VJ Search 2008 (2008)
  - Myx VJ Search 2009 (2009)
  - Myx VJ Search 2010 (2010)
  - Myx VJ Search 2011 (2011)
  - Myx VJ Search 2012 (2012)
  - Myx VJ Search 2014 (2014)
  - Myx VJ Search 2017 (2017)
  - Myx VJ Search 2018 (2018)
  - Myx VJ Search 2019 (2019)
  - Myx VJ Search 2024 (2024)
- Pinoy Myx: Handog kay Pres. Cory (2009)
- Rexona Do The Moves (2014–2015)
- Star Myx: Palmolive's KC Concepcion Top 10 Edition

== See also ==
- List of Philippine television shows
- Myx
- Myx (American TV channel)
