= Parang Kailan Lang =

Single by Maine Mendoza, Gracenote
- Language: Tagalog
- English title: Seems Like Only Yesterday
- Released: March 20, 2020
- Genre: Synth-pop • alternative pop
- Length: 4:38
- Label: Universal Records Philippines
- Songwriter: Eunice Jorge
- Producer: Eunice Jorge

Music video
- "Parang Kailan Lang" on YouTube

"Parang Kailan Lang" (lit. transl. 'Seems Like Only Yesterday') is a song by Filipino actress and television personality Maine Mendoza and Filipino pop-rock band Gracenote. Released on March 20, 2020, under Universal Records Philippines, the track is widely recognized as Mendoza's official debut single as a recording artist. Although she previously released the movie theme "Imagine You and Me" in 2016, "Parang Kailan Lang" marked her first major collaborative effort and her first single to be accompanied by an official music video.

== Background and composition ==
In June 2018, it was first announced that Maine Mendoza was working on her debut album after signing a contract with Universal Records. During the early stages of production, she collaborated with Ito Rapadas of the band Neocolours for an album. However, the project evolved into a collaborative effort with the pop-rock band Gracenote, led by Eunice Jorge.

"Parang Kailan Lang" is a four-minute and thirty-eight seconds song written, composed, and produced by Eunice Jorge, specifically tailored to fit Mendoza's vocal style. It is a mid-tempo track that blends synth-pop and 1980s-inspired alternative pop sounds. Lyrically, the song focuses on the themes of nostalgia, letting go, and moving on from a past relationship. According to Mendoza, the song conveys the feeling of reminiscing about memories that feel as though they happened "just recently" while ultimately choosing to find peace in the present.

== Music video ==
=== Release and production ===
The official music video for "Parang Kailan Lang" was released on March 28, 2020, on the official YouTube channel of Universal Records Philippines. It was directed by Mellan Bernardino, who had previously worked with Gracenote on several projects. The video was filmed prior to the COVID-19 lockdowns, though its release coincided with the height of the quarantine period, during which Mendoza was also active in her "DoNation Drive" fundraiser.

=== Synopsis and themes ===
The video features Mendoza and the members of Gracenote performing the track in a studio-like setting, alternating with scenes of Mendoza in various stylized environments that evoke a sense of nostalgia. The visual aesthetic utilizes soft lighting and vintage-inspired color grading to complement the song's synth-pop sound.

According to reports, the video's narrative focuses on the concept of "moving on and letting go." Mendoza is depicted as a woman reminiscing about past memories—represented by the various "spaces" she occupies in the video—while ultimately finding the strength to walk away from the past. In an interview, Mendoza stated that the song and video are meant to evoke the bittersweet feeling of looking back at a relationship that feels as if it ended "just recently" (parang kailan lang), even if much time has passed.

== Commercial performance ==
"Parang Kailan Lang" experienced significant commercial success upon its release, particularly on digital platforms. Within hours of its debut on March 20, 2020, the song reached the number one spot on the iTunes Philippines All-Genres and Pop charts. The single had notably topped the pre-order charts of the platform as early as February 2020, a month prior to its official launch.

On Spotify, the song reached the third spot on the Philippines Viral 50 chart shortly after its release. By September 2020, Universal Records Philippines announced that the track had surpassed one million streams on the platform.

The song also dominated local music channel charts. It peaked at number one on the Myx Hit Chart, Myx Daily Top 10, and the Pinoy Myx Countdown. According to reports from the Philippine Daily Inquirer, the song maintained its number one position on the Myx Hit Chart for five consecutive weeks.

== Charts ==
Chart (2020)	Peak position
Philippines (iTunes All-Genres)	1
Philippines (iTunes Pop)	1
Philippines (Myx Daily Top 10)	1
Philippines (Myx Hit Chart)	1
Philippines (Pinoy Myx Countdown)	1
Philippines (Spotify Viral 50)	3

== Critical reception ==
"Parang Kailan Lang" received generally positive reviews from music critics and entertainment journalists. Kara Bodegon-Hikino of Bandwagon Asia described the track as a "wistfully mellow pop song" and highlighted the effective collaboration between Mendoza and the "electro-pop act" Gracenote.

Allan Policarpio of the Philippine Daily Inquirer noted the song's "chill-vibed" atmosphere and its departure from Mendoza's previous jazz-influenced movie themes, praising the "unexpected chemistry" between Mendoza’s soft vocals and Eunice Jorge’s polished production. Despite the positive reception, Mendoza herself expressed humility regarding her musical ability in an interview, stating that she does not consider herself a "full-fledged recording artist" and simply wanted to offer "something new" to her supporters.

The song's 1980s-inspired synth-pop sound was also a point of praise, with several outlets noting how it successfully modernized the nostalgic theme of the lyrics while remaining accessible to a mainstream audience.
