= My Myx =

Philippine television music video request program

- Genre: Music video request show Music television
- Developed by: Myx
- Presented by: Myx video jockey
- Original languages: Filipino; English

Production
- Running time: 30 minutes

Original release
- Network: Myx; Myx TV
- Release: March 2001 – August 30, 2020

My Myx is a Philippine television music video request program broadcast by Myx. Hosted by Myx video jockeys, it premiered in 2001. The show concluded on August 30, 2020.

== Overview ==
My Myx was part of the channel's programming lineup by March 2001. The program aired five viewer-requested music videos at a time. By 2004, requests could be submitted through email, text message and postal mail. In 2007, a separate version of My Myx began airing on Myx TV, which was concluded in 2009.

== Hosts ==
The program was hosted by Myx video jockeys and occasionally by celebrities serving as the channel's monthly guest VJ. Actor and television personality Alden Richards introduced the program's featured music videos during his stint as a celebrity VJ in June 2013. Musician Bamboo Mañalac also hosted My Myx and several other Myx programs as the channel's celebrity VJ in July 2013.
