= Maine Mendoza =

Filipino host and actress (born 1995)

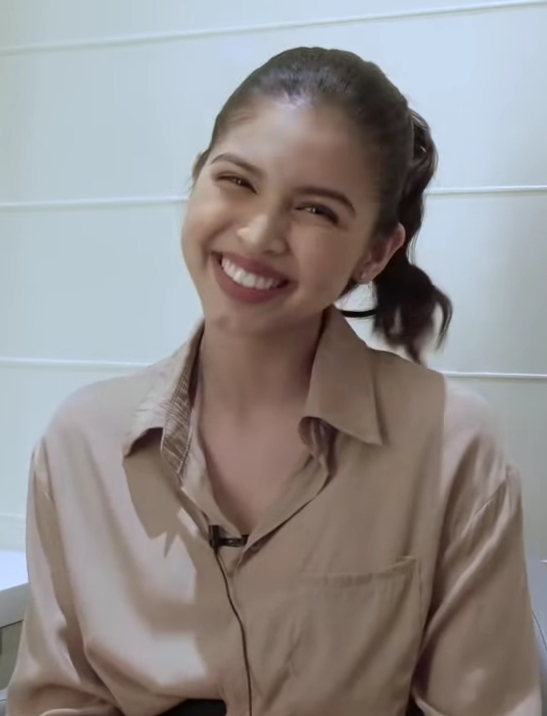
- Mendoza in 2019
- Born: Nicomaine Dei Capili Mendoza; March 3, 1995 (age 31); Santa Maria, Bulacan, Philippines
- Education: De La Salle–College of Saint Benilde (BS)
- Occupations: Television host; actress
- Years active: 2015–present
- Agent: Sparkle GMA Artist Center (2015–2023)
- Known for: Yaya Dub on the "Kalyeserye" segment on Eat Bulaga!
- Spouse: Arjo Atayde (m. 2023)
- Relatives: Sylvia Sanchez (mother-in-law); Ria Atayde (sister-in-law); Zanjoe Marudo (brother-in-law); Billy Crawford (cousin-in-law); Coleen Garcia (cousin-in-law); Japoy Lizardo (cousin-in-law)

Nicomaine "Maine" Dei Capili Mendoza-Atayde (born March 3, 1995) is a Filipino television host and actress. She is best known for her viral Dubsmash videos and her role as Yaya Dub in the noontime variety show Eat Bulaga! segment "Kalyeserye", previously aired on GMA Network and worldwide via GMA Pinoy TV. Her rise to fame is often described as phenomenal and unconventional due to the unscripted forming of AlDub love team in Eat Bulaga! on July 16, 2015, where she was paired with Alden Richards. AlDub is a portmanteau of Richards' first name and Mendoza's character in "Kalyeserye".

Beyond Eat Bulaga!, Mendoza featured in the 2015 film My Bebe Love: #KiligPaMore, for which she won Best Supporting Actress at the 41st Metro Manila Film Festival. She was the lead actress in the 2016 film Imagine You & Me, where she also wrote and sang its theme song. In October 2017, she released her first autobiographical book entitled Yup, I Am That Girl., which is an unfiltered version of her personal blog Pessimistic Optimist Bella.

== Early life ==
Maine Mendoza was born as Nicomaine Dei Capili Mendoza on March 3, 1995, in Santa Maria, Bulacan, Philippines to Mary Ann and Teodoro Mendoza. Mary Ann is an accountant who owns a number of gasoline stations in Bulacan while Teodoro is an engineer with ventures in road construction. She has two brothers and two sisters. All of the names of her siblings also start with "Nico".

She finished high school at St. Paul College of Bocaue in Bulacan. She completed her bachelor's degree in hotel, restaurant and institution management major in culinary arts at De La Salle-College of St. Benilde. She had her internship at The Sagamore in Bolton Landing, New York.

== Career ==
=== Acting career ===
In the early part of 2015, Mendoza posted a Dubsmash compilation on Facebook, where she impersonated Kris Aquino; the video went viral with one million views overnight. This earned her the title "Queen of Dubsmash" in the Philippines. Subsequently, she was cast as Yaya Dub (also known as Divina Ursula Bukbukova Smash), the personal assistant of Lola Nidora (portrayed by Wally Bayola), on Eat Bulaga!'s "Juan For All, All For Juan" segment and first appeared on July 4, 2015. Her character in the segment was paired with fellow Eat Bulaga! co-host Alden Richards that was done without any script, on July 16, 2015, in the romantic-comedy sketch portion of the show titled "Kalyeserye." The couple became popularly known as AlDub, a combination of Richards' first name and Mendoza's character in "Kalyeserye." Their pairing resulted to their wide exposure and to the further increase of the TV ratings of Eat Bulaga! In November 2015, Mendoza joined the cast of Princess in the Palace as Chef Elize, her first appearance in an actual teleserye. In December 2015, she appeared as a guest star in the TV sitcom Vampire Ang Daddy Ko and in the Sunday noontime variety show Sunday PinaSaya.

Mendoza and Richards starred in a 2015 Metro Manila Film Festival (MMFF) entry entitled My Bebe Love #KiligPaMore together with Vic Sotto and Ai-Ai de las Alas. Jose Javier Reyes, the director of the film, confirmed the inclusion of Mendoza in the motion picture. Mendoza plays Anna Carillo, the stubborn and rebellious child of Vic Sotto's character. She was given the Best Supporting Actress award by the MMFF for her role.

In November 2015, they appeared in GMA Network's station ID for Christmas. Even though she appears in GMA, she is not a member of the GMA Artist Center and her career is being managed by Triple A, the talent management arm of Antonio P. Tuviera who is the executive producer of Eat Bulaga!.

Mendoza participated in the Lenten season drama specials of Eat Bulaga! in March 2016. She reprised her role as Divina/Yaya Dub in Kaputol ng Buhay and starred as Dani in God Gave Me You where she won the Darling of the Screen award and was nominated for Most Dramatic Performance by a Lead Star in Eat Bulaga!'s 3rd EB Dabarkads Awards held on April 2, 2016. Mendoza and Richards starred in film Imagine You and Me as lead actors. Some of the scenes of the film were shot in Como, Italy.

In 2017, Mendoza and Richards starred in their first prime time television series Destined to be Yours where Mendoza played the role as Sinag Obispo, a radio DJ and the love interest of Benjie Rosales who is an architect played by Richards. In October 2017, Mendoza and Richards headlined in an Eat Bulaga! produced television film entitled Love is... with Adolf Alix Jr as the director. Since December 2017, Mendoza frequently appears playing different guest roles in Daig Kayo ng Lola Ko.

=== Modeling and endorsements ===
Mendoza and Richards have done a number of product endorsements while Mendoza also appeared in a number of advertisements by herself. She has appeared as the cover girl for Meg magazine and Preview magazine for November 2015. Mendoza and the cast of "Kalyeserye" segment were featured on YES! magazine's November 2015 issue. Mendoza and Richards appeared on the covers of Reader's Digest Asia, a special issue of YES! magazine, and Inside Showbiz and PeopleAsia in December 2015. Aside from being in the cover of PeopleAsia, Mendoza together with Richards received the People of the Year award in 2016 from the magazine. In recognition of Mendoza's effectiveness as a product endorser, she became the Trinitian Awardee for Most Valuable Female Advertising Endorser during Platinum Stallion Awards (Awards for Advertising) in 2016.

Mendoza and Richards were on the cover again of the January 2016 issue of YES! magazine. On the same month, the couple was the first showbiz personalities to land on the cover of BizNews Asia. In the 2016 calendar of Disney Channel Asia, Mendoza appeared as Elsa from the Disney film Frozen. Mendoza appeared in the February 2016 issue of Cosmopolitan magazine with Richards and Esquire Philippines with Jose Manalo, Wally Bayola and Paolo Ballesteros.

In July 2016, Mendoza together with Richards appeared on the cover of YES! magazine for the third time and led the magazine's list of Most Beautiful Stars of 2016. In the same month, Mendoza landed in the 21st rank of FHM Philippines' 100 Sexiest Women for 2016 as a new entry while in July 2017, she climbed a few notches higher and ranked as the 9th sexiest woman. For its 25th anniversary, Mega Magazine named Mendoza as one of the Philippines' "25 iconic women" and she was one of the 25 different covers of their hard bound book Mega Stories. She was also featured on the cover of the Cosmopolitan Philippines magazine's 20th anniversary special.

According to Soltero Salazar of the Association of Philippine Advertisers in June 2017, Mendoza surpassed Kris Aquino as the top celebrity endorser in the Philippines. Soltero added that Aquino has been a top endorser since the 1990s but when she departed from ABS-CBN in 2017 making her rarely seen in television, the advertisers preferred Mendoza instead. With 30 product endorsements in 2016, Mendoza became a top endorser due to her popularity and wholesome image.

=== Writing career ===
Mendoza has been maintaining a personal blog, the Pessimistic Optimist Bella, since 2012. In October 2017, her first autobiographical book entitled Yup, I Am That Girl was published by Summit Media and was launched on October 26, 2017. The book's title is based on her Twitter account's bio and according to its short description, an unfiltered version of her personal blog. After the book launching was declared, the #YupIAmThatGirl trended on Twitter and book authors Lang Leav and Michael Faudet reacted positively to Mendoza's book. Her book was already sold out in just four hours after a bookstore announced its availability.

=== Music career ===
Mendoza wrote and interpreted "Imagine You and Me," the theme song for the 2016 movie of the same name. The music for the song is done by Vic Sotto with arrangements by Jimmy Antiporda. A duet version of the song was also released for the film.

In June 2018, Mendoza signed a record deal with Universal Records. Neocolours lead vocalist Ito Rapadas is the over-all producer of Mendoza's first album.

== Personal life ==
Mendoza and Arjo Atayde were married on July 28, 2023, at the Alphaland Baguio Mountain Lodges Chapel in Baguio. The private ceremony was attended by their families and closest friends.

== Other ventures ==
Mendoza was part of Eat Bulaga! Tamang Panahon benefit concert on October 24, 2015, held at the Philippine Arena where PHP 14 million was raised for the program's AlDub Library Project.

In April 2018, Mendoza launched "Humans of Barangay" which is inspired by Brandon Stanton's Facebook page, "Humans of New York." Mendoza considers this project as her way to inspire more people through stories of people she meets in barangays.

=== Advocacy ===
Mendoza is a supporter of the causes of the Lumad in Mindanao, who experienced expulsion from their lands, persecution, and killings. Her brother-in-law, John Carlos Catalan is a member of the group AlDub for Lumad, which supported a caravan by Lumad leaders in Surigao City. Brigadier General Joey Kakilala, commander of the Civil Relations Office of the Armed Forces of the Philippines, criticized Mendoza and other celebrities on supporting the Lumads saying that they do not know the real story behind the Lumads' cause and are being misled.

Mendoza advocates for same-sex marriage and believes that "everyone has the right to love whoever they want."

=== Entrepreneurship ===
Mendoza ventured into the fast food business after she bought a franchise of the American restaurant chain McDonald's, which she also endorses. Her restaurant formally opened on August 11, 2017, at her hometown in Santa Maria, Bulacan. The exact location of her business is said to be located near the gasoline station business of her family.

== Public image ==
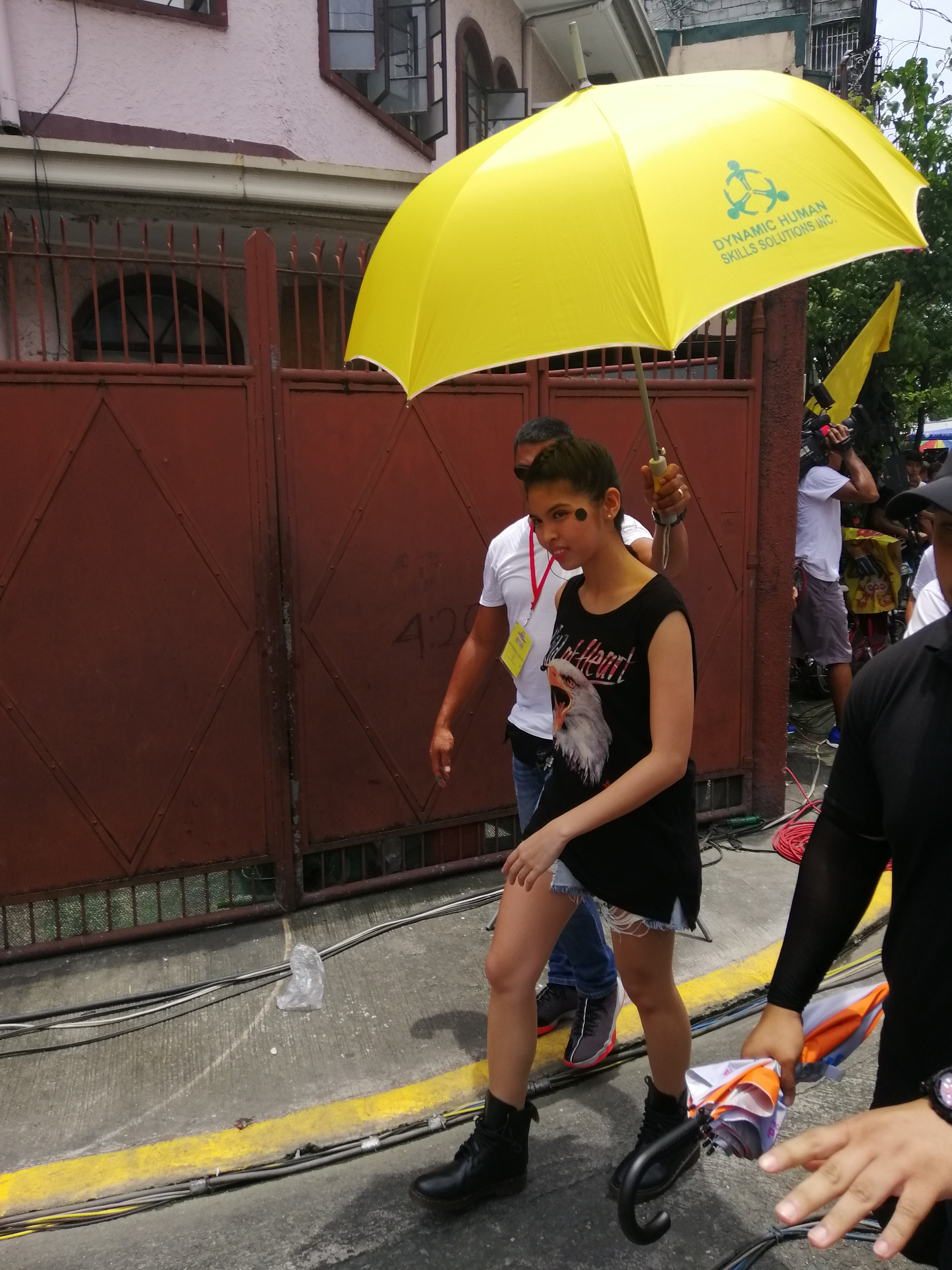
Maine Mendoza dresses as Menggaynita Nunal, one of her characters in Eat Bulaga!.

Being the Philippines' most googled female personality in 2015 and most tweeted Filipino celebrity in the world in 2017, Mendoza is considered to have wide influence on the Internet and social media as recognized by award-giving bodies, earning her title as the Social Media Queen. She has also been nicknamed as "The Phenomenal Star."

In October 2015, Mendoza's Twitter account became the third-fastest growing profile, her followers increased to 1,094,813 in just a few months. Due to her popularity, her social media accounts were hacked twice. One of those hacks happened in November 2015 where her Twitter was taken by a group of hackers who identified themselves as Anonymous Philippines. They posted series of tweets promoting the Million Mask March. Despite hacking the account, they promised to return it to the rightful owner. In less than 24 hours, Mendoza was able to get hold of her social media accounts.

After a series of tweets telling fans to refrain from leaving hateful messages, Mendoza deactivated her Twitter account in June 2017; her other social media accounts are still active. On October 22, 2017, she re-activated her Twitter.

== Filmography ==
Mendoza was featured in several television news magazines and talk shows on GMA Network including Kapuso Mo, Jessica Soho, CelebriTV, and Tonight with Arnold Clavio. Rico Hizon interviewed Mendoza along with Richards for a BBC special report. She also appeared in Lip Sync Battle Philippines through a video-taped recording during the fourth episode of the show in March 2016 where she gave lip-syncing tips to Alden Richards who was the guest of the show. The actress appeared in a series of vignettes explaining what to do and not to do in the 2016 Philippine general elections, as part of GMA News and Public Affairs coverage of the elections dubbed as Eleksyon 2016.

In October 2016, it was revealed that Mendoza has a cameo role in the film Enteng Kabisote 10 and the Abangers.

=== Television ===
Year	Title	Role	Ref.
2015–present	Eat Bulaga!	Herself / Various roles	
2015	Reel Time Presents: AlDub Forever	Herself	
2015	Vampire ang Daddy Ko	Yay	
2015	Princess in the Palace	Chief Elizabeth Recardo	
2015–2019	Sunday PinaSaya	Herself	
2016	Celebrity Bluff	Herself	
2016	Bubble Gang	Herself	
2016	Imagine You and Me: The Journey	Herself	
2016	24 Oras	Herself	
2016	Yan ang Morning!	Herself	
2016	Real Talk	Herself	
2016	Magic Christmas Presents: The 2016 GMA Christmas Special	Herself	
2017	Full House Tonight	Herself	
2017	Destined to be Yours	Sinag Rosales	
2017	iJuander	Herself	
2017	Sarap Diva	Herself	
2017	The Lola's Beautiful Show	Herself	
2017	Daig Kayo ng Lola Ko	Osang Chismosa	
2018	Daig Kayo ng Lola Ko	Laura Patola	
2018	Daddy's Gurl	Visitacion "Stacy" Otogan	
2019	Daig Kayo ng Lola ko	Carol	
2020	Mellow Myx	Celebrity VJ	
2020	My Myx	Celebrity VJ	
2020	Pinoy Myx	Celebrity VJ	
2020	Pop Myx	Celebrity VJ	
2021	POPinoy	Herself	
2021	Maine Goals	Herself	

=== TV movies ===
Year	Title	Role
2016	Kaputol ng Buhay: An Eat Bulaga Lenten Special	Divina
2016	God Gave Me You: An Eat Bulaga Lenten Special	Daniela Tayao
2017	Prensesa: An Eat Bulaga Lenten Special	Mayang
2017	Love is...	Vivienne Castro
2018	Taray ni Tatay: An Eat Bulaga Lenten Special	Mikmik
2018	Pamana	Menggaynita Nunal

=== Films ===
Year	Title	Role	Ref.
2015	My Bebe Love: #KiligPaMore	Anna	
2016	Imagine You and Me	Graciana Malinao	
2016	Enteng Kabisote 10 and the Abangers	Nicomaine	
2017	Meant to Beh	Cameo	
2018	Jack Em Popoy: The Puliscredibles	PO3 Emily Fernandez	
2019	Isa Pa With Feelings	Mara Navarro	
2019	Mission Unstapabol: The Don Identity	Claire	

=== Music videos ===
List of music videos, showing year released and directors
Title	Year	Director(s)	Ref.
"Parang Kailan Lang" (with Gracenote)	2020	Mellan Bernardino	

== Discography ==
=== Soundtrack albums ===
List of soundtrack albums, with selected details
Title	Details
Imagine You and Me	Released: 2016; Label: APT, GMA Music; Format: Digital download, 12"

=== Singles ===
List of singles, showing year released and album name
Title	Year	Album
"Parang Kailan Lang" (with Gracenote)	2020	Non-album singles
"Lost with You"	2021	Non-album singles

=== Soundtrack appearance ===
List of soundtrack appearance, showing year released and album name
Title	Year	Album
"Imagine You and Me" (with Alden Richards)	2016	Imagine You and Me

=== Chart performance ===
List of other charted songs, with selected chart positions and album name
Title	Year	Peak chart positions		Album
Title	Year	PH		Album
Title	Year	Hit Chart	Pinoy	Album
"Parang Kailan Lang" (with Gracenote)	2020	1	1	Non-album single

== Accolades ==
In December 2015, Mendoza got a star at the Philippine Walk of Fame at Eastwood City, Libis, Quezon City along with her "Kalyeserye" co-stars and was named Favorite Young Actress in the 5th OFW Gawad Parangal. Mendoza was also given a Makabatang Alagad ng Telebisyon (Child-friendly Artist on Television) seal by Anak TV in February 2016. Mendoza also won several awards in the Nuffnang Philippines Bloggers Awards. She also won Female TV Star of the Year and Female Breakout Star of the Year for 2016 in the PEPList Awards Year 3 by the Philippine Entertainment Portal.

Aside from being given accolades for her performance as an artist, as a citizen in the Philippines, the Philippine Bureau of Internal Revenue at the regional district office in Caloocan acknowledged Mendoza in August 2017 as the top individual regional tax payer. As alumni of a De La Salle educational institution, Mendoza was given recognition during the 1st Gawad Lasallianeta in September 2017 upon receiving the Zeal for Lasallian Excellence as Media Communicators award. In December 2017, Mendoza received another Anak TV award, the Female Makabata Star award.

Year	Nominee / work	Award	Result
2015	Maine Mendoza	2015 Gintong Kabataan (Golden Youth) Awards - Gintong Kabataan Award sa Larangan ng Sining at Kultura sa Hiyas (Golden Youth Award in the Field of Arts and Culture of Gems)	Won
2015	Maine Mendoza	Breakthrough Performer of the Year - 28th Aliw Awards	Won
2015	Maine Mendoza	PUSH Awards 2015 - Push Elite Newcomer	Won
2015	Maine Mendoza	PUSH Awards 2015 - PushPlay Best Newcomer	Won
2015	"Kalyeserye" and Eat Bulaga!	29th PMPC Star Awards for Television - Best New Female TV Personality	Nominated
2015	Maine Mendoza	DepEd and City of Makati - Star Values Award	Won
2015	Meg Nov 2015 Issue	Starmometer's Covergirl of the Year (2015)	Won
2015	My Bebe Love: #KiligPaMore	41st Metro Manila Film Festival - Best Supporting Actress	Won
2016	My Bebe Love: #KiligPaMore	32nd PMPC Star Awards for Movies - New Movie Actress of the Year	Nominated
2016	Maine Mendoza	Nickelodeon Kids' Choice Awards - Favorite Pinoy Personality	Won
2016	Maine Mendoza	47th GMMSF Box-Office Entertainment Awards - Breakthrough Female Star of Philippine Movies and TV	Won
2016	My Bebe Love: #KiligPaMore	47th GMMSF Box-Office Entertainment Awards - Most Promising Female Star	Won
2017	Imagine You and Me	48th GMMSF Box-Office Entertainment Awards - Princess of Philippine Movies	Won
2017	"Imagine You and Me"	33rd PMPC Star Awards for Movies - Movie Original Theme Song of the Year (for the lyrics and interpretation). Mendoza won the award together with Vic Sotto (music), Jimmy Antiporda (music arrangement) and Alden Richards (fellow interpreter).	Won
2017	Maine Mendoza	7th EdukCircle Awards - Most Influential Female Celebrity Endorser of the Year	Won
2017	Eat Bulaga!	31st PMPC Star Awards for Television - Best Female TV Host	Nominated
2017	Maine Mendoza	65th FAMAS Awards - German Moreno Youth Achievement Award (special award)	Won
2019	Jack Em Popoy: The Puliscredibles	50th GMMSF Box-Office Entertainment Awards - Box Office Queen	Won
2019	Daddy's Gurl	33rd PMPC Star Awards for Television - Best Comedy Actress	Won
2020	Maine Mendoza	EdukCircle Awards - Actress of the Year	Won
2020	Maine Mendoza	EdukCircle Awards - Most Influential Celebrity of the Decade	Included
