= Myx News =

Philippine television entertainment news program

- Title card (2017–2019)
- Genre: Infotainment
- Presented by: Myx video jockeys
- Country of origin: Philippines
- Original languages: Tagalog; English

Production
- Camera setup: Multiple-camera setup
- Running time: 30 minutes

Original release
- Network: Myx
- Release: September 24, 2005 – December 28, 2019

Myx News is a Philippine television entertainment news program broadcast by Myx. Hosted by Myx video jockeys, it premiered on September 24, 2005. The show concluded on December 28, 2019.

== Overview ==
Myx News featured entertainment news segments, music updates, and celebrity interviews. One of its recurring segments was the Myxclusive Interview, where artists were interviewed about their latest projects and appearances. The program also aired Myx News Year-End Special, a year-end specials which featured highlights of entertainment news and events from the year.

== Hosts ==
- Iya Villania
- Bianca Roque

== International broadcast ==
Following the conclusion of the program on the Philippine feed in 2019, Myx News continued airing on the Myx TV and on The Filipino Channel until the early 2020s.

In 2020, ABS-CBN International launched TAYO News, a digital entertainment and news brand aimed at younger audiences and features celebrities. The digital news branding was later incorporated into Myx Global under the Myx News name.
