= Myx Daily Top 10 =

Philippine television music chart program

- Title card (Note: 2015–16, 2019–25)
- Genre: Music chart Variety show
- Developed by: Myx
- Presented by: Various Myx video jockeys
- Country of origin: Philippines
- Original languages: English; Filipino

Production
- Running time: 60 minutes

Original release
- Network: Myx Global
- Release: June 3, 2002 – August 18, 2025

Myx Daily Top 10 (also known as Myx Daily Top Ten) is a Philippine television music chart program broadcast by Myx Global. Hosted by Myx video jockeys, it premiered on June 3, 2002. The show concluded on August 18, 2025.

== Overview ==
Myx Daily Top 10 serves as a daily countdown of the ten most popular music videos in the Philippines, determined by fan votes on Myx Global website. The program is hosted by various Myx VJs, who present the daily rankings and provide artist trivia to the viewers.

The program has featured numerous hit songs that have topped the chart for several consecutive weeks, serving as a measure of an artist's popularity in the Philippine music industry.

On July 29, 2016, Myx Daily Top 10 aired its final episode to make way for its two new editions, Myx Daily Top 10 International Edition and Myx Daily Top 10 Pinoy Edition, which premiered on August 1, 2016. On December 31, 2018, both editions aired their final episodes, with Myx Daily Top 10 returning on January 1, 2019.

=== Transition and discontinuation ===
On August 18, 2025, the program ceased airing as a standalone television show and was incorporated as a segment of Myx Now, which was premiered on September 1, 2025, where the countdown continues to be featured alongside other music and pop culture content. The chart remains active online, with viewers still able to vote and access the daily rankings through the official Myx Global website.

During the first week of July 2026, viewers noted that the music chart listings, including the online chart listings of Myx International Top 20, Pinoy Myx Countdown, and Myx Hit Chart, had been removed from the Myx Global website. By the release of the network's June 29–July 5 programming schedule, no standalone Myx chart programs remained on the channel's lineup, marking the complete disappearance of Myx's long-running chart brand from both television and its online platform. As of July 2026, Myx had not issued an official statement regarding the programs' status.

== Editions ==
The program introduced two spin-off editions, Myx Daily Top 10 International Edition and Myx Daily Top 10 Pinoy Edition, both of which premiered on August 1, 2016 after the original Myx Daily Top 10 aired its final episode on July 29, 2016. The International Edition featured international music videos, while the Pinoy Edition focused on Filipino music videos. Both editions concluded on December 31, 2018, after which the original Myx Daily Top 10 returned on January 1, 2019.

== Hosts ==
Myx Daily Top 10 is typically presented by the channel's mainstay (regular) video jockeys (VJs), including VJ Robbie, VJ Ella, and VJ Ozzie.
