= Gracenote (band) =

Filipino rock band

- Genres: Alternative rock, pop rock, synth rock, electropop, pop punk
- Years active: 2008–present
- Labels: Soupstar Music, Warner, Universal Records, EMI/UMG
- Members: Eunice Jorge; EJ Pichay; Jazz Jorge; Tatsi Jamnague
- Past members: Chen Pangan; Alvin Ortiz; Rico Cristobal
- Website: Gracenote's Facebook Page

Gracenote is a Filipino pop rock band currently composed of Eunice Jorge (vocals, keyboards, guitars, violin), EJ Pichay (drums), Jazz Jorge (bass), and Tatsi Jamnague (guitars). They are known for their cover of Stevie B's "Dream About You". The single "Minsan Lang Naman" brought them success in the mainstream. They participated in Coke Studio Season 1 with Raymond "Abra" Abracosa, making the song "Stargazer" and covering Abracosa's "Ilusyon".

== History ==
Members of Gracenote met at St. Scholastica's College, Manila. As with many bands, they started with small gigs. They entered a number of band competitions, and were named first runner-up at the Sing for Cancer Battle of the Bands 2008, finalist in Nescafe Soundskool 2008, and Grand Champion in DZUP: College Collision 2009.

In 2009, the band's original bass player Rico Cristobal left and was replaced by lead vocalist Eunice Jorge's brother Jazz Jorge.

In 2010, they performed at ABS-CBN's Music Uplate Live, and later released an 8-track album entitled First Movement under the management of Soupstar Entertainment. The single "Pwede Ako" topped the Pinoy MYX Countdown.

Their 8-track album First Movement, produced by 6cyclemind’s Rye Sarmiento, with carrier single “Minsan Lang Naman”, highlights the band’s heartfelt lyrics and melody. First Movement's “Minsan Lang Naman” has entered several music channels and radio programs’ hit charts. Their album “Transparent” featured a sound which they categorized as electro-pop-rock. It features “I Will Wait”, “Two Four” and “Taciturn” as singles.

They were part of the lineup of Coke Studio PH and worked with rapper and flip-top artist Abra to produce “Stargazer” with their Coke Studio episode, reaching 2.5 million views. The band also collaborated with Chito Miranda, vocalist of Parokya ni Edgar, through the song “Bakit Ganyan Ka?.” The song reached more than 800,000 views in less than 24 hours and 28,000 shares on Facebook. It has gone viral on Spotify’s Philippines Viral 50 (reached no. 3 spot). “When In Manila” blog site calls it the newest original Philippine music love anthem.

In 2013, Gracenote performed at the Converse Sneaker Clash.

== Influences ==
The band's influences include American rock bands such as Paramore, Yellowcard, No Doubt, Sum 41, Switchfoot, Underoath and Taking Back Sunday and Stevie B, as well as Filipino bands APO Hiking Society and Eraserheads. The band also cited Hillsong United as an influence.

== Members ==
- Eunice Jorge – lead vocals, keyboards, synthesizers, rhythm guitar, violin, ukulele, percussion, additional drums (2008–present)
- EJ Pichay – drums, percussion (2008–present)
- Jazz Jorge – bass guitar (2009–present); co-lead and backing vocals (2015–present); synthesizers (2017–present)
- Andrew John "Tatsi" Jamnague – lead and rhythm guitar (2017–present, touring/session 2015–2017)

=== Former members ===
- Chen Pangan – lead and rhythm guitar, co-lead and backing vocals (2008–2015)
- Alvin Ortiz – guitars (2008–2011)
- Rico Cristobal – bass guitar (2008–2009)

== Discography ==
=== EP ===
| Artist | Album | Tracks | Year | Records |
|---|---|---|---|---|
| Gracenote | Gracenote EP | "Minsan Lang Naman" "StopStop" "Crush" "Tama Na" "Dream About You" | 2010 | Self-recorded |
| Gracenote | Almost Christmas | "Christmas Break" "Loud Night" "Almost Christmas, Pt.2 " "Single Bell" "Ha Ha Happy New Year" | 2019 | Universal Records; Soupstar Music |
| Gracenote | Kinsenas at Walang Katapusan EP | "Taong Robot" "Tigil" "Sindi 2021" "Maiba Taya ft. Jim Paredes" "Tulog Nang Tulog" | 2023 | Soupstar Music |

=== Singles ===
| Year | Single | Album |
|---|---|---|
| 2018 | "When I Dream About You" | Single |
| 2019 | "Bakit Ganyan Ka?" (with Chito Miranda) | Single |
| 2019 | "Baso at Bote" | Single |
| 2019 | "You Are Loved" | Single |
| 2020 | "Parang Kailan Lang" (with Maine Mendoza) | Single |
| 2020 | "Paulit-ulit" (Stripped Version) | Single |
| 2020 | "I'm Done" (Stripped Version) | Single |
| 2020 | "It’s Okay to Not Be Okay" | Single |
| 2021 | "Apektado" | Single |
| 2022 | "Sindi" | Single |
| 2022 | "Kalituhan" (with Monty Macalino) | Single |
| 2023 | "Content Ako Sa'yo" (with Chito Miranda) | Single |
| | "Tigil" | Single |
| | "TAONG ROBOT" | Single |
| 2024 | "Babaeng Torpe" | Single |
| | "Gusto Kong Magsolo" | Single |

=== Studio album ===
| Artist | Album | Tracks | Year | Records |
|---|---|---|---|---|
| Gracenote | First Movement | "Knock Knock" "Pwede Ako" "Amnesia" "Faraway" "Minsan Lang Naman" "Play It Again" "Stop Stop!" "Amnesia" (Acoustic) | 2012 | Universal Records; Soupstar Music |
| Gracenote | Transparent | "Two Four" "Taciturn" "I Will Wait" "Give Me A Break" "Someone" "Gusto Ko" (feat. Alexa Ilacad) "Pause" "Bilog" (ft. Yeng Constantino) "Respeto"; Bonus track: "Flynn Rider" | 2016 | Warner Music Philippines; Soupstar Music |
| Gracenote | & | "Bilog" (with Yeng Constantino) "Stargazer" (with Abra (rapper)) "Flyin Rider" (with 6cyclemind) "Gusto Ko" (with Alexa Ilacad) "Bakit Ganyan Ka" (with Chito Miranda) "Summer Song" (with Autotelic, and December Avenue) "Bakit Ganyan Ka" (Acoustic) | 2019 | Warner Music Philippines; Soupstar Music |
| Gracenote | Small World | "Arrival" "City Of Vulnerability" "Fantasy" "Here I Go Again" "Oh Darling!" "Paulit-Ulit" "We're Not Alone" "Im Done" "Machine Gun" "No Hate" "Hello Earth" "Kalawakan" "Waterfall" "Departure" | 2020 | Universal Records; Soupstar Music |

* Eunice Jorge also collaborated with Kean Cipriano of Callalily for a special project under Universal Records: Kean and Eunice: A Trip Down Memory Lane.
* Gracenote also interpreted the song entitled "Yun Tayo" Composed by Donna Onilongo for Philpop 2018 and won the Live Smart People's Choice Award.

== Awards ==
| Year | Award giving body | Category | Nominated work | Results |
|---|---|---|---|---|
| 2012 | Meg Magazine | Top Newcomer | —N/a | Won |
| 2015 | PMPC Star Awards for Television | Female Rock Artist of the Year | —N/a | Nominated |
| 2016 | Awit Awards | Best Rock/Alternative Recording | "I Will Wait" | Nominated |
| 2017 | Awit Awards | Best Cover Art | "Transparent" | Won |
| 2017 | MYX Music Awards | Favorite Group | —N/a | Nominated |
| 2018 | Philippine Popular Music Festival (also known as Philpop) | People's Choice | "Yun Tayo" | Won |

== Notable performances ==
- May 1, 2012 – front act for Secondhand Serenade
- August 16, 2012 – front act for Nelly Furtado
- October 16, 2014 – Kean & Eunice: Happy Together at The Music Museum
