= MyxRadio =

Filipino-language online radio station

myxRADIO
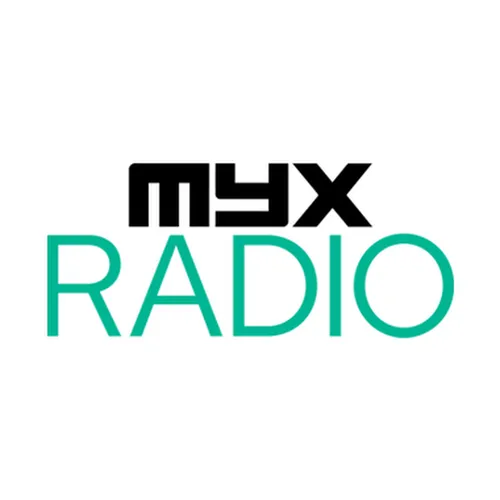

Daly City, California; United States
- Broadcast area: Worldwide (online)

Programming
- Language: English
- Format: Top 40

Ownership
- Owner: ABS-CBN Corporation
- Operator: ABS-CBN International
- Sister stations: MOR Entertainment (via ABS-CBN Radio Service); Myx (Philippines); Myx (America)

History
- First air date: November 1, 2019; 6 years ago

Links
- Webcast: Listen Live via Dash Radio; Listen Live via Zeno FM; Listen live (via TuneIn)
- Website: myx.global/myxradio

myxRadio (stylized as myxRADIO) is a 24-hour commercial-free Top 40 radio station owned by ABS-CBN Corporation and operated in partnership with digital radio platform Dash Radio.

== History and profile ==
The station began its operations in beta on November 1, 2019. It was officially launched on November 27, 2019, the night before Thanksgiving Day, at the 143Thx Music Festival in Los Angeles.

Initially, the station features a lineup of weekly programming dedicated to hip hop and pop music by Filipino and Asian American artists around the world. It has over 3 million monthly listeners in the United States and Canada.

Myx Radio is also available on ABS-CBN Radio Service and Alto app.

== See also ==
- Myx (America)
- Myx (Philippines)
- Dash Radio
- Filipino Americans
