= List of MYX Number-One Music Videos 2014 =

MYX is the only music channel in the Philippines that shows different music videos, domestically and internationally. Every week, its MYX Hit Chart presents the Top 20 favorite music videos voted by People's choice. In 2014, Taylor Swift's "Shake It Off" spent the longest week for any music video with a total of 10 weeks and later became the chart's year-end special Top 1. The year is also lucky for Western boy bands such as One Direction, 5 Seconds of Summer and The Vamps as their released music videos were all chart-toppers. Philippine acts including Sarah Geronimo, Gloc-9, Kyla, and more also dominated the chart with most weeks.

== Chart History ==
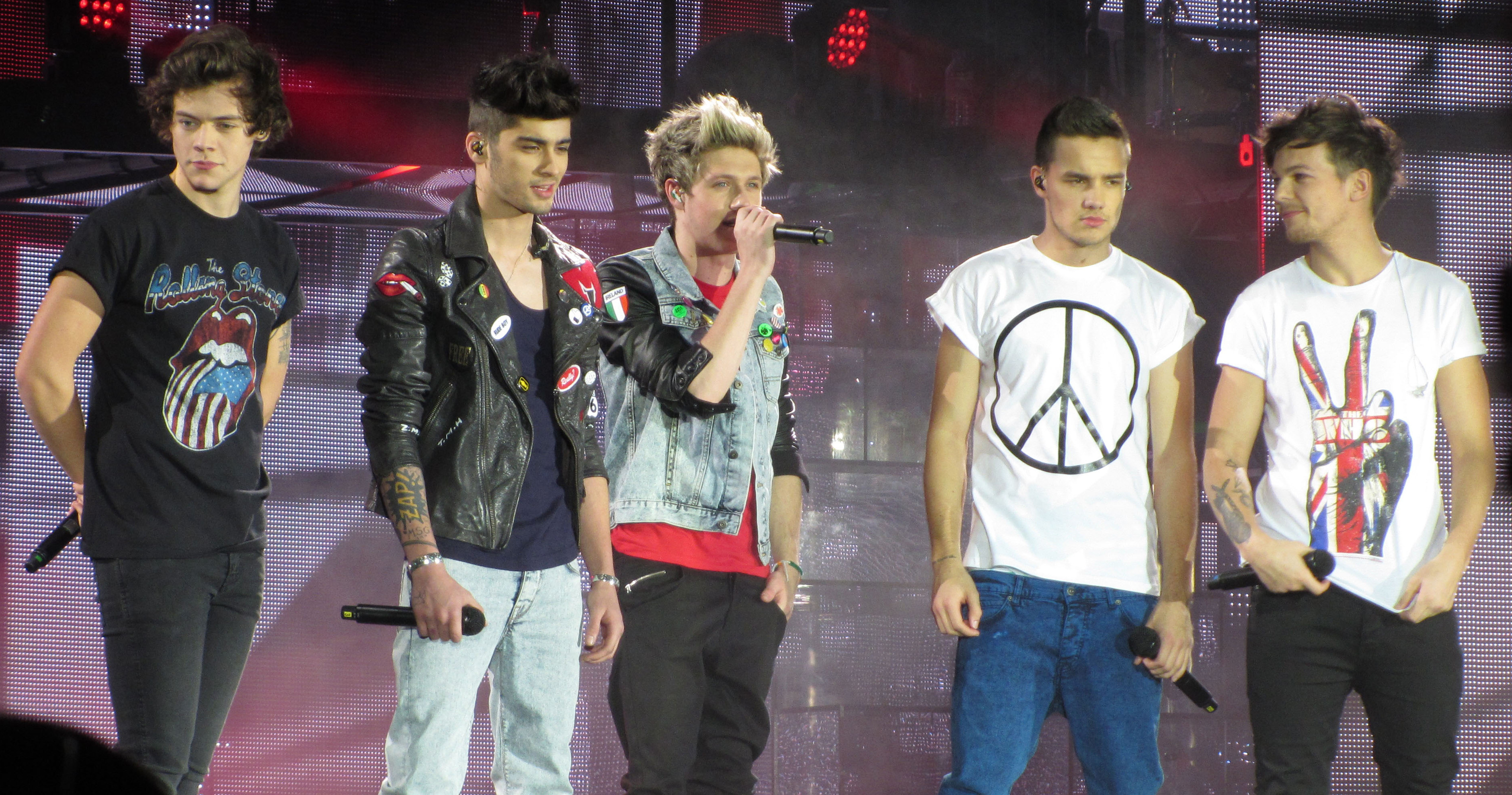
One Direction is the only artist with most #1 Music Videos in a single year. These include "Midnight Memories", "You & I", "Steal My Girl" and "Night Changes".

Key	†	Indicates "MYX 2014 Best Music Video"

Issue date	Music Video	Artist(s)	Ref.
January 5	"Tayo"	Sarah Geronimo	
January 12	"Tayo"	Sarah Geronimo	
January 19	"Tayo"	Sarah Geronimo	
January 26	"Tayo"	Sarah Geronimo	
February 2	"Tayo"	Sarah Geronimo	
February 9	"Midnight Memories"	One Direction	
February 16	"Midnight Memories"	One Direction	
February 23	"Midnight Memories"	One Direction	
March 2	"Dark Horse"	Katy Perry (featuring Juicy J)	
March 9	"Dark Horse"	Katy Perry (featuring Juicy J)	
March 16	"Dark Horse"	Katy Perry (featuring Juicy J)	
March 23	"Come Back Home"	2NE1	
March 30	"Mr.Mr."	Girls' Generation	
April 6	"Come Back Home"	2NE1	
April 13	"Come Back Home"	2NE1	
April 20	"Come Back Home"	2NE1	
April 27	"Skool Luv Affiar"	BTS	
May 4	"You & I"	One Direction	
May 11	"You & I"	One Direction	
May 18	"You & I"	One Direction	
May 25	"Overdose"	Exo	
June 1	"Overdose"	Exo	
June 8	"Overdose"	Exo	
June 15	"Overdose"	Exo	
June 22	"Overdose"	Exo	
June 29	"Don't Stop	5 Seconds of Summer	
July 6	"Somebody to You"	The Vamps (featuring Demi Lovato)	
July 13	"Somebody to You"	The Vamps (featuring Demi Lovato)	
July 20	"Somebody to You"	The Vamps (featuring Demi Lovato)	
July 27	"Kunwa-Kunwari Lang"	Kyla	
August 3	"+63"	Sponge Cola (featuring Yeng Constantino)	
August 10	"This Love Is Like"	Toni Gonzaga	
August 17	"Amnesia"	5 Seconds of Summer	
August 24	"Amnesia"	5 Seconds of Summer	
August 31	"Overdose"†	Exo	
September 7	"Overdose"†	Exo	
September 14	"Overdose"†	Exo	
September 21	"Overdose"†	Exo	
September 28	"Overdose"†	Exo	
October 5	"Overdose"†	Exo	
October 12	"Overdose"†	Exo	
October 19	"Overdose"†	Exo	
October 26	"Overdose"†	Exo	
November 2	"Overdose"†	Exo	
November 9	"Shake It Off"	Taylor Swift	
November 16	"Shake It Off"	Taylor Swift	
November 23	"Shake It Off"	Taylor Swift	
November 30	"Shake It Off"	Taylor Swift	
December 7	"Night Changes"	One Direction	
December 14	"Night Changes"	One Direction	
December 21	"Night Changes"	One Direction	

== See also ==
- Myx Music Awards 2014
