= Finally! =

Studio album by Iya Villania
- Released: 2008
- Genre: Pop
- Language: English; Filipino
- Label: Viva Records
- Producer: Vic Del Rosario, Arnold Vegafracia, Vincent Del Rosario & Roselle Monteverde-Teo

Finally! is the first and only album by Filipino TV personality and actress, Iya Villania.

== Track listing ==
No.	Title	Writer(s)	Length
1.	"My First Broken Heart"	Allan Rich, Dorothy S. Gazely	3:54
2.	"Definitely Lonely"	Arnie Mendaros	4:01
3.	"I Never Cry"	Alice Cooper & Dick Wagner	3:23
4.	"Spell's Broken"	Allan Feliciano & Mike Villegas	3:10
5.	"With Me Tonight"	Monty Macalino	3:34
6.	"Poison"	Monty Macalino	3:25
7.	"Do You Think We'll Be Alright"	Allan Feliciano & Mike Villegas	3:34
8.	"Always" (featuring Jay R)	David Lewis, Jonathan Lewis and Wayne Lewis	3:55
9.	"All Over Me"	Arnie Mendaros	4:57
10.	"It Takes A Man And A Woman" (arranged by Champ Lui Pio, Roll Martinez Jr., Jose A. Gellada and Geronimo Saroca)	D. Randell and L. Randell	4:10
11.	"Morning After"	Allan Feliciano And Angelo Villegas	3:18
12.	"I'm Gonna Shine"	Athena "Aina" Antiporda
13.	"Takaw Tingin"	Bong Figueroa	1:50
