= U Can Dance =

- Title card
- Genre: Reality competition
- Presented by: Iya Villania; Derek Ramsay
- Country of origin: Philippines
- Original language: Filipino
- No. of seasons: 2
- No. of episodes: 25

Production
- Running time: 60 minutes

Original release
- Network: ABS-CBN
- Release: June 11, 2006 – October 13, 2007

U Can Dance (later U Can Dance Version 2.0 in the second season) is a Philippine television reality competition show broadcast by ABS-CBN. Hosted by Iya Villania and Derek Ramsay, it aired on the network's Saturday and Sunday evening line up from June 11, 2006 to October 13, 2007, replacing Pinoy Big Brother: Teen Edition 1 and was replaced by Pinoy Big Brother: Celebrity Edition 2.

== Series overview ==
Season	Episodes	Originally released	
Season	Episodes	First released	Last released
1	11	June 11, 2006	August 20, 2006
2	14	July 14, 2007	October 13, 2007

== Season 1 ==
Iya Villania and Derek Ramsay were the hosts of ABS-CBN's new dance reality competition, which aired every Sunday night. The show has two contests, Sayaw Baranggay, wherein two dance groups from different barangays dance their way into winning the weekly prize, as well as the chance to go head to head with the other weekly winners at the monthly eliminations. Many prizes were to be won for the weekly kabarangay winners wherein they would receive 10,000 pesos cash while the winners of the monthly eliminations would receive 20,000 pesos, while an ACSAT computer package and two water dispensers and an industrial fan from Eureka would be given to their barangay. As for the Sayaw Baranggay Grand Prize, the winning group would receive Puma watches, Rudy Project eyewear, a 2-year scholarship from ACSAT and 500,000 pesos cash, while their barangay would receive a livelihood showcase from ACSAT.

The Celebrity Showdance competition featured 12 pairs of celebrities and professional dancers who would go against each other in the weekly eliminations. Out of the 12 pairs of celebrity show dancers, three pairs that will be picked through an electronic raffle will face off in the weekly eliminations. The celebrity show dancers who has the highest score for the week will win 10,000 pesos in cash. Aside from the 500,000 peso grand prize, there's also Puma watches, limited edition Rudy Project eyewear, 20,000 pesos worth of gift certificates from Salon Isabel, a living room showcase from WL Foods, a 2-year scholarship from ACSAT, and a business franchise worth 450,000 pesos from Kaila bags and accessories that would be awarded to the winning pair.

Six male and six female celebrities are paired with 12 professional dancers, their performances will be rated by three celebrity judges, Choreographer Maribeth Bichara, Jhong Hilario from the Streetboys. As a bonus, the segment "I Can Make You Dance" features celebrities who were voted by the viewers to guest on the show.

=== Winners ===
Celebrity Showdown

- Arron Villaflor (Season 1)
- Rodjun Cruz (Season 2)

== Season 2 ==
=== Celebrity Judges at U Can Dance Version 2 ===
- Dina Bonnevie
- Pops Fernandez
- Eula Valdez
- Jackie Lou Blanco
- John Prats
- Charlene Gonzales
- Cherie Gil
- Vilma Santos
