= Vid-OK =

Filipino music television channel

- Country: Philippines

Programming
- Picture format: 480i (SDTV)

Ownership
- Owner: Creative Programs, Inc.
- Sister channels: ABS-CBN; Studio 23

History
- Launched: Late 1990s
- Closed: June 2, 2002; 24 years ago

Vid-OK was a Filipino music television channel operated by Sky Cable. It originally followed a sing-along format before developing into a music channel featuring music videos, viewer requests, contests, and other music-related programming.

== History ==
By 2000, Vid-OK was operating as a 24-hour channel on Sky Cable. Its programming included viewer-requested music videos and the Vid-OK Hit Chart, a daily program that ranked popular songs based on viewer requests. The channel also aired concert footage edited as music videos with lyrics and produced promotional segments for events involving recording artists.

Vid-OK initially followed a strict sing-along format, but under the direction of Andre Alvarez, the channel shifted toward popular and frequently requested songs, added retro-oriented segments, and introduced audience-participation events and contests. These changes increased ratings. A November 2001 Philippine Daily Inquirer feature, Vid-OK was described as a music video channel.

=== Merger with Myx ===
On February 14, 2002, ABS-CBN executives declared that Vid-OK would be merged with Myx, then a music programming block on Studio 23. The resulting channel was relaunched in June 2002 under the Myx name, incorporating elements of Vid-OK's format, including the airing of music videos with lyrics.

== Final programming ==
Vid-OK's programming included music videos, viewer-requested songs, chart programming, retro music segments, contests, and audience-interaction features.

== See also ==
- Myx
- Sky Cable
- Studio 23
