= Imagine You and Me =

- Theatrical release poster
- Directed by: Michael Tuviera
- Written by: Renato Custodio Jr.; Aloy Adlawan
- Produced by: Jose Mari Abacan; Annette Gozon-Abrogar; Marvic Sotto; Antonio P. Tuviera
- Starring: Alden Richards; Maine Mendoza
- Cinematography: Shayne O. Sarte
- Edited by: Tara Illenberger
- Music by: Richard Gonzales; Jay Dominguez
- Production companies: M-Zet Productions; APT Entertainment; GMA Films
- Distributed by: GMA Films
- Release date: July 13, 2016
- Running time: 120 minutes
- Country: Philippines
- Language: Filipino
- Budget: ₱60 million
- Box office: ₱198 million

Imagine You and Me (stylized as Imagine You & Me) is a 2016 Philippine romantic comedy film directed by Mike Tuviera. The film stars Alden Richards and Maine Mendoza. The film was released on July 13, 2016, as AlDub's first anniversary offering, which happened on July 16, 2016, three days after the film was shown. It was screened primarily in the Philippines and also had screenings in other countries such as Canada, Italy, and the United States. The film follows the story of Andrew and Gara as their opposite beliefs cross paths in Italy.

The Cinema Evaluation Board of the Philippines evaluated the film as high quality and gave a B grade. On its first day of showing in cinemas, the film grossed over ₱21.5 million making 2016's highest opening gross for a Philippine film until it was surpassed by Barcelona: A Love Untold.

== Plot ==
Gara is an Overseas Filipino Worker (OFW) who works in Italy and believes in destiny and true love. On the other hand, Andrew is a medical student who is grief-stricken, very pragmatic, and unenthusiastic about accepting fate. As they cross paths in Italy, their personal beliefs help them recognize each other and unusually view love.

Circumstances in her family led to Gara's departure from the Philippines and work in various jobs in Italy. One of her jobs involves pet-sitting a dog of Clarissa. One day, Gara sees Andrew at the park, seemingly depressed. A thief suddenly grabs Andrew's bag and then goes after the snatcher. Gara also pursues the thief and gets the bag from the thief but Andrew is nowhere in sight. She peruses Andrew's smartphone to find contacts and inform them about the whereabouts of Andrew's belongings.

Aside from being a pet sitter, Gara also works as a household helper for Terry who turns out to be the stepmother of Andrew. Gara and Andrew have not met personally and Andrew sees Gara in their living room while browsing his smartphone. Andrew confronts Gara saying that she is connivance with the thief. After arguing, they accidentally fall and hug on the couch. Terry comes into the scene and ends their feud. Gara eventually returns Andrew's bag and their romantic relationship starts.

Andrew discovers that his ex-girlfriend Isay left him. A flashback shows that Andrew had presented Isay with a heart-shaped glass and a wedding ring, which was intended for their proposal. Isay refused to give both, and the glass fell and broke. Andrew hoped that Isay would come back and explain everything about their breakup. He leaves pieces of the broken glass in all of the places that they have been. Gara finds one of the pieces of glass in front of Clarissa's house. She deduces that the identities of Isay and Clarissa are the same. Isay is suffering from leukemia and ends her relationship with Andrew as a result.

Gara arranges a meeting between Andrew and Isay so that they can inform together, before deciding to return to the Philippines. Realizing that Andrew is grateful to Gara, Isay persuades him to follow her. Gara begins her journey to the airport but is hit by a car when she stares at Andrew. As the injured Gara is still recovering in the hospital, Andrew expresses his love for her. Andrew and Gara embrace and share a kiss.

== Cast ==
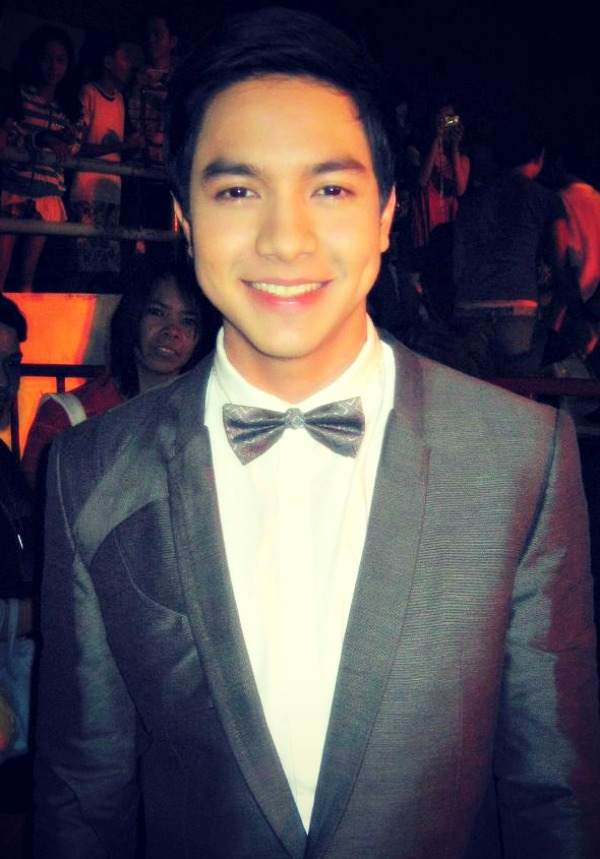
Alden Richards, Portrays Andrew Garcia

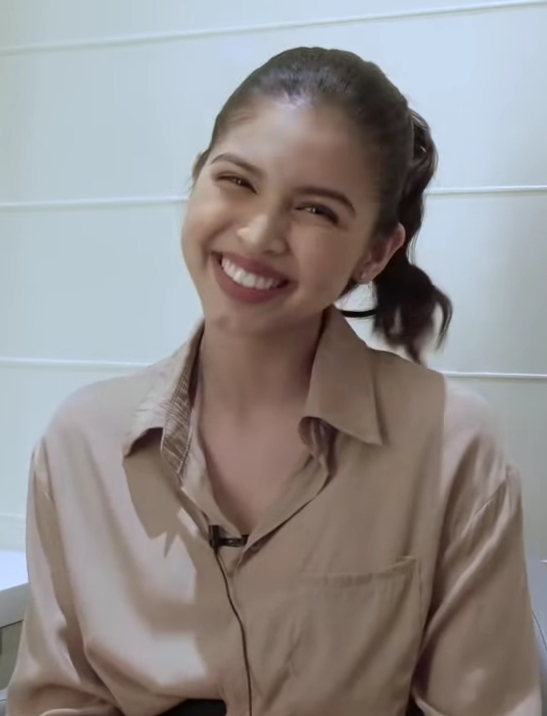
Maine Mendoza, Portrays Graciana "Gara" Malinao

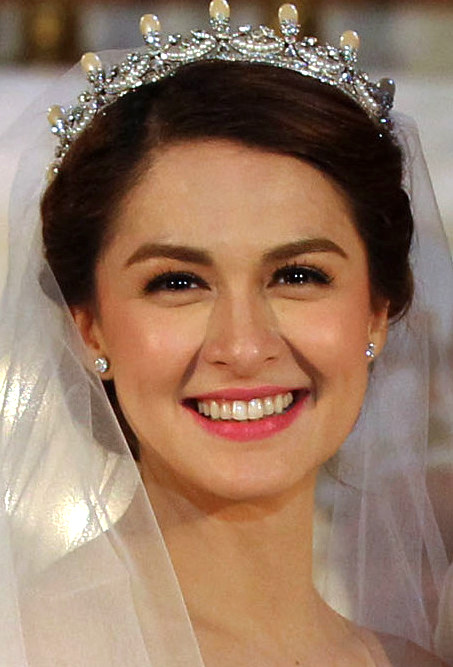
Marian Rivera, as the Fortune-teller in the Special Participation.

=== Main cast ===
- Alden Richards as Andrew Garcia
- Maine Mendoza as Graciana "Gara" Malinao

=== Supporting cast ===
- Jasmine Curtis-Smith as Clarissa / "Isay"
- Irma Adlawan as Terry
- Kakai Bautista as Winona
- Cai Cortez as Vangie

=== Extended cast ===
- Roberto Bocchi as Maurizio Rosales
- Yayo Aguila as Merced Malinao
- William Martinez as Benjo Malinao
- Luis Alandy as Arnold Malinao
- Elijah Alejo as Gina Malinao
- Lovely Abella as Kaye Malinao
- Ken Chan as Bryan
- Jeric Gonzales as Rudy
- Jerald Napoles as Val

=== Special participation ===
- Marian Rivera as the Fortune-teller

== Production ==
=== Development ===
A project commemorating the first anniversary of AlDub was unveiled in March 2016, which was made into a film the next month. Imagine You and Me was the first film with Alden Richards and Maine Mendoza in leading roles. The film was planned to be shot in Italy and according to its director, Mike Tuviera, it would be a dream come true for him and of his father, APT top executive Tony Tuviera, to do a film in Italy. The director also said that the film is a tribute to OFWs who became a big part to the success of Kalyeserye. Mike Tuviera initially wanted an action-horror film for AlDub since he is best known with that kind of genre but the production company insisted on romantic comedy film for AlDub as expected by fans. As for the story concept, there were eight scripts submitted before the final script got approved. It was written by Aloy Adlawan and Renato Custodio.

=== Filming ===
Production of the film began in May 2016 in Como, Italy. According to Como, Italy's website La Provinicia di Como, Richards and Mendoza were accompanied by 35 crew members, along with director Mike Tuviera. The shoot in Como, Italy started on May 9, 2016, and ended on May 18, 2016, with the support of the municipality government of Como. There also scenes shot in Verona, Italy where Richards and Mendoza had a scene at the statue of Juliet. It is one of the only two films (the other one is the film adaptation of Angels & Demons by Dan Brown) permitted to shoot in Verona. Overall, according to Rams David of Triple A (the talent agency of Maine Mendoza), 95% of the film was shot in Italy.

During filming, Tuviera used benches in many scenes to honor Kalyeserye creator Jenny Ferre who is fond of benches. He also added that Jasmine Curtis-Smith, one of the film's supporting cast, was sick in the duration of the shoot in Italy and since Curtis-Smith role is a sickly person, the director used Curtis-Smith's situation for method acting.

=== Music ===
Maine Mendoza wrote the lyrics of the film's theme song with music by Vic Sotto and arranged by Jimmy Antiporda (member of the defunct band Neocolours). On June 16, 2016, Mendoza performed the song "Imagine You and Me" on Eat Bulaga!. A duet version of the song with Alden Richards is also included in the film.

The film's soundtrack, including its instrumental version was released and streamed on July 8, 2016, in the digital music services. On its day of release, the songs lead the charts in iTunes Philippines. It was also released digitally on Spotify and Google Play.

As reference to Kalyeserye, there are several lip syncing scenes between Richards and Mendoza. As background music for their lip sync, they have used several songs including "Magkaibang Mundo" by Jireh Lim and Charlie Puth's "One Call Away." Although Puth's song did not make it in the theatrical release and fans were clamoring to include the scene in the home media release as director's cut.

== Release ==
The 120-minute film Imagine You and Me premiered at SM Megamall on July 12, 2016, and was released in the Philippines on July 13. During its opening day, Imagine You and Me grossed ₱21.5 million. This revenue reflects ticket sales in the Philippines where most of it comes from the provinces outside Metro Manila. On July 17, the film grossed ₱120 million.

The film opened initially with 195 theaters nationwide but the producers added 35 theaters more due to demand and thus, it was shown in a total of 230 theaters over the Philippines for its succeeding days. Although there were cinemas in the Philippine provinces that experienced screening delays due to technical problems. Due to the large volume of moviegoers, the producers decided to add 35 more theaters. On its second week, the theaters were reduced to 187.

It was also screened internationally and was released in Italy, United Kingdom, United States, Canada, Hong Kong, Singapore, United Arab Emirates, Guam, New Zealand and Australia. AlDub fans arranged numerous block screenings of the film. The block screenings in a mall in Manila benefited the GMA Kapuso Foundation, a non-profit organization doing social-welfare services.

== Reception ==
=== Critical response ===
The Cinema Evaluation Board of the Philippines composing people from the Filipino film industry evaluated the film and gave a B grade. Having graded B means that Imagine You and Me is of high quality and shall receive 65% tax rebate. Actress Kris Aquino gave a late review of the film through an Instagram post and she was all praises to the director, the main cast and Jasmine Curtis-Smith. Television anchor and host Teddy Locsin of ANC's NoFilter@ANC also reviewed Imagine You and Me and said that the film "is a deft retelling of Romeo&Juliet. Alden&Maine are refreshingly natural, not playing characters as living them." He further said that Mendoza reminds him of Jennifer Aniston.

Mari-an Santos of Philippine Entertainment Portal gave a balanced review as she praised the setting, writers and cast especially Richards and Mendoza's natural performances. On the other hand, she criticized the plot loopholes such as the unsecured smartphone and the portrayal of Gara as an OFW "could have been better." Oggs Cruz of Rappler described the film as "harmless diversion" and taken note how the writers creatively portrayed the popularity of Kalyeserye within the familiar plots of the romantic comedy genre and how the director complemented the writing prowess. Furthermore, Cruz praised Mendoza's "very relatable charisma" and concluded that "the film’s being well-made just adds a certain justification to all the heightened promises of romance."

Nazamel Tabares, a blogger at Movies Philippines, rated the film 3 stars out of 5 saying that "pleasant all throughout, Imagine You & Me may give nothing new to the pile of romantic comedy films in the Philippines but the film isn't ridiculously written and doesn't overdo the tired genre." Philbert Ortiz Dy of ClickTheCity.com, a lifestyle guide website, rated the film 2 stars out of 5 saying that "without any real investment in narrative gravity, the film would have likely been better off staying cute, leaving all the terminal illnesses to the movies that actually want to do those stories." Ted Claudio, a blogger at Wazzup.ph, had two ratings for the film. As a film in the perspective of AlDub fans, he gave a 5 stars out 5 while for non-AlDub fans, he gave a rating of 4 stars out of 5 stating that it is good dating film "for its great location, story, fun and romance."

=== Accolades ===
At the 2017 Box Office Entertainment Awards, Imagine You and Me received awards for Prince of Philippine Movies (Richards) and Princess of Philippine Movies (Mendoza). The film's theme song "Imagine You and Me" won Movie Original Theme Song of the Year (Mainstream) at the 33rd PMPC Star Awards for Movies.

== Documentary special ==
A documentary special, Imagine You and Me: The Journey, was aired on GMA Network on July 9, 2016.
