= Myx International Top 20 =

Philippine television music chart program

- Title card from 2025 to 2026
- Genre: Music chart
- Developed by: Myx
- Presented by: Myx video jockeys
- Country of origin: Philippines
- Original language: English

Original release
- Network: Myx Global
- Release: September 1, 2007 – June 27, 2026

Myx International Top 20 (abbreviated as M.I.T. 20) is a Philippine television weekly music chart program broadcast by Myx Global. Hosted by Myx video jockeys, it premiered on September 1, 2007. The show concluded on June 27, 2026.

== Overview ==
Myx International Top 20 is a music chart program that features rundown of the most popular international music videos, based on viewer votes. The show highlights global chart trends and international pop music releases. Votes are collected through online voting via the Myx Global website.

In addition to its weekly countdown, Myx International Top 20 also released a year-end results chart, summarizing the most successful international music videos based on accumulated votes throughout the year.

During the first week of July 2026, viewers observed that Myx International Top 20 had been removed from both the Myx Global website and the channel's published television schedule. The June 29–July 5 programming schedule also omitted the chart show, leading to speculation that it had been discontinued. Myx had not publicly announced the program's removal as of July 2026.
