= List of Myx video jockeys =

This is a list of video jockeys (VJ) as well as hosts of the global music channel, Myx.

== VJs ==
=== Current VJs ===
- Ameera Almamari (2025–present)
- Ella Regudo (2025–present)
- Jarren Garcia (2025–present)
- Kring Prologo (2025–present)
- Robbie Jaworski (2025–present)
- Ozzie Llige (2025–present)

=== Former VJs and hosts ===
- Ai dela Cruz (2013–2022)
- Ala Paredes (2002–2004)
- Alex Diaz (2016–2017)
- Andrei Felix (2007–2009)
- Angel Jones
- Anthony Saludares
- Anton Fausto (2019–2020)
- Aya Fernandez (2019)
- Bernard Palanca (2002–2004)
- Bianca Roque (2008–2014)
- Carlos Calderon
- Chino Lui Pio (2008–2015)
- Clara Balaguer (2000–2002)
- Danielle Mortel (2019–2020)
- Debbie Then (2017)
- Diego Loyzaga (2015)
- Donny Pangilinan (2016–2018)
- Ed Feist (2000–2002)
- Edward Barber (2019–2020)
- Erica Abello–Daniels (2015)
- Francis Reyes
- Franco Mabanta (2002)
- Geoff Eigenmann (2004–2007)
- Gianna Llanes (2014–2015)
- Heart Evangelista (2002–2007)
- Igi Guerrero (2007–2009)
- Iñigo Pascual (2018–2019)
- Iya Villania (2004–2014)
- Jairus Aquino (2016–2017)
- Janine Ramirez (2009–2011)
- JC Tevez (2017)
- Jett Pangan (2004–2019)
- John Eastwood (2000–2002)
- Jon Salkin
- Joyce Pring (2011–2012)
- Julz Savard (2010–2011)
- K.A. Antonio (2012–2013)
- K–La Rivera (2011–2012)
- Karel Marquez (2003–2007)
- Karla Aguas (2013–2014)
- Kaye Reyes (2018)
- Kaz Castillo (2000–2002)
- Kim Cruz (2017)
- Lourd de Veyra (2000–2002)
- Luigi D'Avola (2014–2015)
- Luis Manzano (2003–2013)
- Malaya Lewandowski
- Mark San Diego
- Mica Froilan (2007–2008)
- Michael Mariano (2012–2013)
- Michelle Ng (2012–2013)
- Michi Valeriano (2002)
- Mike Advincula (2011–2012)
- Monica Yncierto (2008–2010)
- Nathan Ursua
- Nel Gomez (2009–2010)
- Nikki Gil (2005–2016)
- Paul Hammond
- Raimund Marasigan (2003–2018)
- Rico Blanco (2002–2003)
- Robi Domingo (2008–2010, 2014–2020)
- Robin Nievera (2010–2011)
- Sally Acupan (2003)
- Sam Concepcion (2013–2015)
- Samm Alvero (2018–2025)
- Sanya Smith (2007–2008)
- Sharlene San Pedro (2016–2019)
- Sunny Kim (2016–2019)
- Tippy Dos Santos (2015–2017)
- Ton Vergel de Dios (2010–2011)
- Turs Daza (2017–2018)
- Tutti Caringal
- Vieo Lopez (2014–2015)
- Ylona Garcia (2019)
