= Pinoy Myx =

Philippine television music video program

- Title card used from 2017–2021
- Genre: Music program
- Developed by: Myx
- Presented by: Myx VJs
- Original language: Tagalog

Production
- Running time: 30–60 minutes

Original release
- Network: Myx
- Release: May 1, 2009 – December 5, 2021

Pinoy Myx is a Philippine television music video program broadcast by Myx. Hosted by Myx video jockeys, it premiered on May 1, 2009. It replaced OPM Myx (which originally debuted on June 3, 2002). The show concluded on December 5, 2021.

== Overview ==
The program aired daily on Myx in the Philippines and was broadcast in two formats: a 30-minute version and a 1-hour timeslot. It featured Filipino music videos and highlights local artists across various genres serving as a platform for showcasing Original Pilipino Music (OPM).

On August 5, 2009, Myx aired a special edition of Pinoy Myx titled Pinoy Myx: Handog kay Pres. Cory as a tribute to former Philippine president Corazon Aquino. The 30-minute special featured songs associated with Aquino's life and presidency, along with prayers, messages, online tributes, and interviews with celebrities and notable personalities reflecting on her legacy.

On October 31, 2012, the program, alongside Myx Backtrax and Mellow Myx, featured a Halloween-themed special presenting classic music videos with horror and dark themes. The special continued on All Saints' Day, November 1, as part of a "spooky video marathon."

The program, along with Pop Myx, concluded on December 5, 2021.

== Hosts ==
- Iya Villania
- Julz Savard
- Luis Manzano
- Chino Lui-Pio
- Bianca Roque
- Joyce Pring

Celebrity VJs

- Ella Cruz
- JK Labajo
- Jane Oineza
- Matteo Guidicelli
- Bela Padilla
- Bailey May
- Ylona Garcia
- JC de Vera
- Andrea Brillantes
- Kyle Echarri
- Michael V.
- Frankie Pangilinan
- Lou
- Andre
- Fumiya Sankai
- Yamyam Gucong
- Maine Mendoza
