= Iya Villania =

Filipino actress, model and singer-dancer (born 1986)

- Born: Raelene Elaine Villania (Note: Iya Villania was born in Australia. Thus, she does not possess her mother's maiden name which is Ebaler.); June 29, 1986 (age 40); Sydney, Australia
- Occupations: Singer; actress; model; dancer; television presenter
- Years active: 2002–present
- Agents: Sparkle GMA Artist Center (2002–2004; 2014–present); Star Magic (2004–2014)
- Spouse: Drew Arellano (m. 2014)
- Children: 5

Raelene Elaine "Iya" Villania-Arellano (born June 29, 1986), (Tagalog: [ˈʔija bilˈjaɲɐ ʔɐrɛlˈjanɔ]), is a Filipino singer, actress, model, dancer, and television presenter. She has been widely known for her work as a VJ in the music channel Myx and as the Chika Minute segment anchor in GMA's primetime newscast 24 Oras.

== Early and personal life ==
Raelene Elaine Villania, the last of three siblings, was born on June 29, 1986, in Sydney, Australia. She was raised by Filipino parents, Ray Villania and Elena Nada Ebaler. Villania's interest in music started when her father sang karaoke when she was a child. She used to be a member of a touring band in Australia called Iron & Clay that address issues in schools and churches such bullying, drunk driving, and self-esteem. Later, she moved to the Philippines and attended high school at Colegio San Agustin in Makati, graduating In 2004. She attended college at De La Salle University – Manila majoring in psychology and graduated on December 16, 2008.

In 2004, Villania began dating television presenter Drew Arellano. They married in Nasugbu, Batangas in January 2014. The couple have five children.

Villania is an advocate for abstaining from sex before marriage. She divulged that she had not had sexual intercourse before marrying Arellano, who himself was supportive of her decision. Although she does not necessarily condemn women who has had intercourse, she remarked that virginity is "something that a girl can be proud of". Raised in the Seventh-day Adventist Church, she is now a practicing Evangelical Christian.

In January 2022, Villania, alongside Arellano and their three children, tested positive for COVID-19.

== Career ==
Villania's first television appearance in the Philippines was In 2003 on the IBC interactive program Game Channel. After she gained a "cult" following, the management team of GMA Network took notice and cast her in the daytime drama Walang Hanggan. She then played the role of Sydney Torres in the third and fourth seasons of the iconic teen series Click.

In 2004, she moved to GMA's rival network ABS-CBN and was announced as one of the new VJ's for their subsidiary music channel Myx. She would remain in the job for 10 years. Subsequently, she was regularly featured in the variety show ASAP. Villania's feature film debut was in the 2004 drama A Beautiful Life alongside acclaimed actresses Gloria Romero, Dina Bonnevie and Amy Austria. In the same year, Villania appeared in the critically acclaimed historical film Aishite Imasu 1941: Mahal Kita. Her run as host on ABS-CBN included co-hosting the noontime game show Wowowee from its premiere in February 2005 until June 2006, the two seasons of the reality dance competition show U Can Dance in 2006 and 2007, the reality show I Dare You In 2011 and her two-year stint on ABS-CBN's morning show Umagang Kay Ganda. Villania also hosted the Studio 23 lifestyle program Us Girls from 2006 to 2012. In 2008, she released her first album, Finally! under Viva Records.

After signing an executive contract with GMA Network in October 2014, Villania made a part of Sunday All Stars (2013–2015), a variety show. This marked her return to GMA Network after a decade in ABS-CBN. In June 2015, she joined the newscast 24 Oras as its Chika Minute segment anchor, replacing Pia Guanio. Iya was chosen from a group of 15 individuals, as she contacted Guanio to secure that role during Iya's audition. Initially having doubts about the Tagalog language, she prepared for her role by reading tabloids to learn more Filipino words. She previously acted as that segment's guest anchor to substitute Guanio before her departure.

== Popular culture ==
She accidentally popularized a now very common Filipino slang greeting "haller/heller" in place of "hello". This was credited to her distinctive and then-unfamiliar Australian twang in her early showbiz career years. On her show, Game Channel - Filipino viewers misheard her intro greeting as though she is saying "Heller!".

== Discography ==
- Finally! (2008)

== Filmography ==
=== Film ===
Year	Title	Role
2004	A Beautiful Life	Janice
2004	Aishite Imasu 1941: Mahal Kita	Julia
2004	Spirit of the Glass	
2005	Exodus: Tales from the Enchanted Kingdom	Lin-Ay
2006	Pamahiin	Eileen
2007	Paano Kita Iibigin	Tessa
2009	When I Met U	Tracy
2009	Shake, Rattle & Roll 11	Lia †

=== Television ===
Year	Title	Role
2003	Kahit Kailan	Marjorie
2003–2004	Click	Sydney Torres
2003	Walang Hanggan	Rachelle
2003	Gamechannel	Game Jock
2004	Gamechannel Extreme	Game Jock
2004	SOP Gigsters	Herself / Host
2004	ASAP Fanatic	Herself / Host
2004	Seasons of Love	Alex
2004–2014	My Myx	VJ
2004–2014	Myx Hit Chart	VJ
2004–2014	Myx Versions	VJ
2004–2009	OPM Myx	VJ
2004–2014	Pop Myx	VJ
2004–2014	ASAP	Herself / Co-host
2005–2006	Wowowee	Herself / Co-host
2005–2014	Myx News	VJ
2006	U Can Dance	Herself / Host
2006	Komiks Presents: Da Adventures of Pedro Penduko	Budlis
2006	Your Song Presents: Narda	Lea
2006–2012	Us Girls	Herself / Host
2007	Your Song Presents: Never Knew Love Like This Before	Becca
2007	U Can Dance Ver. 2	Herself / Host
2007	Love Spell Presents: Ellay Enchanted	Cast Member
2007	Mars Ravelo's Lastikman	Yellena White
2008	Palmolive Shining Circle of 10: Batch 2008	Herself / Host
2008	Mysmatch	Herself / Host
2008	OMG!	Herself / Host
2009	Only You	Trixie Gonzales
2009–2014	Pinoy Myx	VJ
2010	Precious Hearts Romances Presents: Kristine	Scarlett Saavedra
2011–2012	It's Showtime	Herself / Guest
2011	I Dare You	
2011	Pilipinas Got Talent (season 2)	Herself / Guest Host
2011–2013	Umagang Kay Ganda	Herself / Host
2013	Apoy sa Dagat	Helena Redentor
2014	Sunday All Stars	Herself / Host / Performer
2014	Startalk	Herself / Guest
2014	The Ryzza Mae Show	Herself / Guest
2014–2016	Taste Buddies	Herself / Host
2015	Mundo ni Juan	Herself / Host
2015	Ang Pinaka	Herself / Guest host
2015–present	Home Foodie	Herself / Host
2015–present	24 Oras	Chika Minute segment anchor
2015	Sunday PinaSaya	Herself / Guest
2015–2016	Because of You	Rebecca Reyes
2016	Yan ang Morning!	Herself / Guest
2016	Lip Sync Battle Philippines	Herself / Host
2017	People vs. the Stars	Herself / Host
2017	Mars	Herself / Guest
2017	Sunday PinaSaya	Herself / Guest
2017–2018	My Korean Jagiya	Kennedy Santos
2017	All Star Videoke	Herself / Host
2019–2022	Mars Pa More	Herself / Host
2019	Tunay na Buhay	Herself / Guest
2023	Zero Kilometers Away	Special Participation
