= Myx Hit Chart =

Philippine television music chart program

- Title card (2025–2026)
- Genre: Music chart
- Developed by: Myx
- Presented by: Myx video jockeys
- Country of origin: Philippines
- Original languages: English; Filipino

Production
- Running time: 120 minutes

Original release
- Network: Myx Global
- Release: June 9, 2002 – June 28, 2026

Myx Hit Chart is a Philippine television weekly music chart program broadcast by Myx Global. Hosted by Myx video jockeys, it premiered on June 9, 2002. The show concluded on June 28, 2026.

== Overview ==
Myx Hit Chart is a music chart program that features the Top 20 most-voted and requested music videos from local and international artists presented by the Myx VJs, including VJ Iya Villania from 2004 to 2014. The countdown is based on viewer votes submitted through their official website.

During the first week of July 2026, viewers noticed that Myx Hit Chart had been removed from both the Myx Global website and the channel's television schedule. The June 29–July 5 programming schedule also omitted the chart show, leading to speculation that it had been discontinued. Myx had not publicly announced the program's removal as of July 2026.
