= Pinoy Myx Countdown =

Philippine television music chart program

- Title card from 2025 to 2026
- Genre: Music chart
- Developed by: Myx
- Presented by: Myx VJs
- Country of origin: Philippines
- Original language: Filipino

Original release
- Network: Myx Global
- Release: September 24, 2005 – June 27, 2026

Pinoy Myx Countdown is a Philippine television weekly music chart program broadcast by Myx Global. Hosted by Myx video jockeys, it premiered on September 24, 2005 following the conclusion of OPM Myx Countdown, which aired from June 8, 2002 to September 17, 2005, and featured a similar chart of OPM music videos. The show concluded on June 27, 2026.

== Overview ==
Pinoy Myx Countdown is a music chart program that features the Top 20 most-voted and requested music videos from Filipino artists presented with comical skits performed by the Myx video jockeys. The countdown is based on viewer votes submitted through their official website.

The program also features an annual year ender, highlighting the Top 20 Filipino music videos of the year.

During the first week of July 2026, viewers noticed that Pinoy Myx Countdown was no longer listed on the Myx Global website and had been removed from their television programming schedule. The following week's schedule, covering June 29–July 5, likewise did not include the program, prompting speculation among viewers that the long-running music chart had been discontinued. As of July 2026, Myx had not issued an official statement regarding the program's status.
