= Myx =

Music-entertainment television channel in the Philippines

- The Beat of our Culture
- Country: Philippines
- Headquarters: ABS-CBN Broadcasting Center, Diliman, Quezon City, Metro Manila, Philippines

Programming
- Languages: English (main); Filipino (secondary)
- Picture format: 4:3 480i (SDTV)

Ownership
- Owner: ABS-CBN Corporation
- Parent: Creative Programs
- Sister channels: A2Z; ALLTV2; ANC; Cine Mo!; Cinema One; Jeepney TV; Kapamilya Channel; Knowledge Channel; Metro Channel; Myx (US); MyxRadio; DZMM Radyo Patrol 630; DZMM TeleRadyo; The Filipino Channel; Favorite Music Radio; MOR Entertainment (online radio)

History
- Launched: November 20, 2000; 25 years ago

Links
- Website: myx.global

Availability

Terrestrial
- SkyTV Metro Manila: Channel 205
- Cignal TV Nationwide: Channel 150
- SatLite Nationwide: Channel 111
- G Sat Nationwide: Channel 22

Streaming media
- iWant: Watch live

Myx (/ˈmɪks/, stylized as MYX or myx and pronounced as mix) is a Philippine pay television channel based in Quezon City and owned by Creative Programs, a subsidiary of ABS-CBN Corporation.

Historically, Myx primarily aired music videos and music-related programming, particularly during its early years as a music television channel in the Philippines. Following the consolidation of its Philippine and international operations under Myx Global, the channel expanded its programming beyond music videos to include entertainment programs, talk shows, live performances, and other music- and youth-oriented content. The Myx Music Awards were established in 2006 and have been held in selected years, with the most recent edition taking place in 2024, and has given to the most influential personalities in the Philippine music industry.

== Etymology ==
The name MYX was derived from the word mix, referring to the mixing of musical genres and the mixing of tracks in music production. According to channel head Andre Allan Alvarez, the name also incorporates the letter Y in reference to Generations X and Y, although MYX is not officially an acronym. The name was developed by Alvarez, Studio 23's Edson Aguilar, and Mouse Muñoz, then the creative head of the channel's on-air group, in 2000. Before settling on MYX, other names considered included AMP (for "amplified"), VOL (for "volume"), and XYM (for Generations X and Y and music).

== History ==
Logo used from 2002 to 2021.

Myx began airing as a programming block on ABS-CBN's sister television network, Studio 23 (later S+A from 2014 to 2020, and now Aliw 23) on November 20, 2000 at 8 am PHT. A Philippine Daily Inquirer feature published in December 2000 indicated that Myx would officially launch on January 1, 2001 at 1:00 a.m. It was intended to be the replacement of MTV Philippines. It aired on Studio 23 before primetime and after primetime hours. During that time, Myx featured the widest variety of music from different genres such as pop, rock, urban, world and ethnic, and dance.

On February 14, 2002, ABS-CBN executives declared that Myx and Vid-OK would be merged. As a result, the resulting channel was relaunched on June 3, 2002 under the Myx name, incorporating Vid-OK's format of airing music videos with lyrics.

In September 2006, Myx launched Myx Magazine, also known as Myx Mag, a print publication featuring music and entertainment, including interviews, lyrics and features on local and international artists, published by ABS-CBN Publishing, Inc. In 2012, The Philippine Star described it as the country's "number one music magazine" in a feature on its cover story featuring Bamboo and the T5 bands. The magazine was later discontinued in mid-2010s.

In June 2009, Myx, along with Lifestyle Network underwent a change of image.

In 2011, Myx, through ABS-CBN Interactive, released the Myx Charts mobile application for Android and iOS devices. The app enabled users to access the network's weekly local and international music video charts from their mobile devices worldwide. In January 2012, it became the most downloaded free music application on the Android Market, surpassing the Android Music Player. The application was later known as the MyxPH app before it was eventually discontinued.

On January 16, 2014, Myx stopped airing on Studio 23 when the channel was renamed to ABS-CBN Sports and Action (S+A). During ABS-CBN's early digital terrestrial television trials, Myx2 was introduced as a digital counterpart to Myx, alongside other digital channels such as Yey and Sine Box. Myx2 was later discontinued before the commercial launch of ABS-CBN TV Plus in February 2015. In 2018, Myx was added to the ABS-CBN TV Plus digital terrestrial platform on channel 12. It was later removed in 2020 due to the shutdown of ABS-CBN TV Plus, when the company's broadcasting franchise expired without renewal.

In 2016, Myx programming was also carried through ABS-CBN's Kapamilya Box Office (KBO), airing from midnight to 6:00 a.m.

In June 2021, Myx in the Philippines and its international version adopted a common logo, introduced internationally the year before, and merged their digital assets.

In July 2021, Cignal TV owned by MediaQuest Holdings partnered with ABS-CBN Corporation to add Myx and its sister channel Cinema One to Cignal's channel line-up as a free trial and later as "add-ons" for lower plans.

On September 1, 2025, the channel migrated to the 16:9 anamorphic widescreen format. The change allowed for a widescreen presentation, optimizing the viewing experience for viewers with compatible widescreen televisions.

== VJs and hosts ==
Myx has produced some of the most popular VJs in the country, including Lourd de Veyra, Luis Manzano, Geoff Eigenmann, Heart Evangelista, Nikki Gil, Bernard Palanca, and Iya Villania. Since 2007, Myx has produced the annual Myx VJ Search with the aim of searching the country's best VJs; the finalists will be given the chance to be a VJ on Myx. Myx currently has six VJs—Kring Prologo, Jarren Garcia, Robbie Jaworski, Ameera Almamari, Ella Regudo and Ozzie Llige; the channel previously had more, but after losing the broadcast franchise, the other VJs were laid off as part of corporate retrenchment at ABS-CBN.

== Programming ==
Myx programming consists primarily of themed blocks of music videos and music chart shows, as well as concerts, events, and live performances.

Since 2022, Myx both International and Philippines feed refreshed its programming by removing the theme blocks of music videos and added more lifestyle and general entertainment shows in order to expand its selection towards the global audience (except for chart shows only available to Philippine feed).

Both Philippine and International feed of Myx Global airs only two music programs daily, Myx Press Play and The OPM Hour.

From August 18, 2025, Myx Daily Top 10 stopped airing as a TV show and it will continue as a segment of Myx Now, but the chart show results is only available on the Myx Global website.

During the first week of July 2026, viewers noticed that charts shows—Myx Hit Chart, Myx International Top 20, and Pinoy Myx Countdown, including Myx Daily Top 10 as a segment of Myx Now, was no longer listed on the Myx Global website and had been removed from their television programming. As of July 2026, Myx had not issued an official statement regarding the program's status.

== International ==
In 2007, Myx TV (originally launched simply as Myx) was launched in the United States. The American counterpart of Myx was originally intended to cater the Asian-American youth community in United States and with music video as its primary content. It was later reformatted to become a general-entertainment channel targeted to the Asian-American diaspora. Myx TV is operated independently from its Filipino counterpart with some of its programming produced in the United States by ABS-CBN International and by other third-party production companies.

== See also ==
- List of Myx Number-One Music Videos 2014
- List of programs broadcast by Myx
- Myx Music Awards
- Vid-OK
