= Myx (American TV channel) =

Asian American pay TV channel owned by ABS-CBN Global

- The Beat of our Culture
- Country: United States
- Broadcast area: United States; Middle East; Europe; Guam; Africa
- Headquarters: ABS-CBN International, 2001 Junipero Serra Blvd, Suite 200 Daly City, CA 94014

Programming
- Language: English
- Picture format: 480i (SDTV)

Ownership
- Owner: ABS-CBN Corporation
- Sister channels: Myx (Philippines); MyxRadio; TFC

History
- Launched: February 28, 2007; 19 years ago (as myxTV); November 5, 2020; 5 years ago (as myx)
- Former names: myxTV (2007–2020)

Links
- Website: myx.global

Availability

Terrestrial
- Zuku TV (Kenya): Channel 765

Myx (pronounced "mix") is an American pay TV channel based in Daly City, California with an office also in Redwood City, California targeting a multicultural audience. As a sister network to Myx (Philippines), it launched in the United States in 2007. MyxRadio launched in November 2019 as a radio station on Dash Radio & as a global podcast on Spotify, iHeartRadio & Apple iTunes in March 2020. A video on demand service for Myx shows is also available via iWant and TFC IPTV.

== Background ==
Logo from 2007 to 2011.

ABS-CBN Global launched myxTV on DirecTV on February 28, 2007 from its corporate headquarters in Redwood City, California. myxTV is the American counterpart of myxPH, an influential music channel in the Philippines, and is programmed and operated independently.

In 2011, myxTV changed its logo, slogan, and programming.

In May 2013, myxTV launched a video on demand app on Roku, followed by launches on other over-the-top content platforms including Samsung Smart TV.

In February 2014, myxTV moved its operations to Glendale, California.

In November 2019, at the 143Thx R&B Music Festival, myxTV launched a new 24/7 radio station on Dash Radio.

On November 5, 2020, myxTV rebranded as a global version of Myx that will spotlight the next generation of Filipino-American talent as a premium cable, radio, and digital content provider. The newly launched platform aims to be an entertainment, lifestyle, and cultural touchstone for Filipino-American audiences and beyond.

== Programming ==
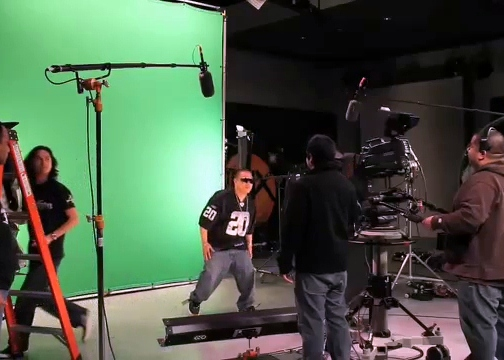
A program for Myx in production in Studio TFC, Redwood City, California.

Myx's programming includes acquired programs from Asia and the United States such as Japanese sports game show Unbeatable Banzuke, K-pop music variety show Music Bank, reality competition Supermodel Me, musical drama The Kitchen Musical, and classic cartoon series Voltron. Myx TV began producing original reality shows in 2014 and premiered its first series I'm Asian American and... on April 23, 2014. In June 2014, the network premiered its first original competition reality show Call to Cosplay, which is also the first ever cosplay competition show in the United States. Two more original reality series Bagged and Eat Your Words premiered in August and October, respectively, with both series renewed in 2015.

In January 2015, Myx TV became the first U.S. cable network to air K-Pop live music countdown show Inkigayo. The network also launched an Asian horror movie block called Shiver and Shake in July 2015.

In August 2015, Myx TV launched three new series exclusively for its YouTube channel, The Alternative, Buddha Smash, and Snaxxx.

In May 2016, Myx TV launched the dating reality series mother vs Matchmaker with celebrity matchmaker Carmelia Ray, which continued into 2017 with Season 2 and 2.5.

In January 2017, Myx TV launched My Motto, a digital profile series highlighting Asian American talent such as Yaya Han, a costume designer, model and cosplay entertainer based in Atlanta, Georgia, Patrice Clearly of "Purple Patch" restaurant in Washington D.C., Hokuto Konishi, dance member of Quest Crew from the hit MTV show America's Best Dance Crew. In September 2017, My Motto: Veteran's Edition became 6 Certified through Got Your 6 and was named a finalist in the Cablefax Program Awards in the Video on Demand Program/Special category.

== The Nutshack ==
In 2007, an adult animated sitcom created by Ramon Lopez and Jesse Hernandez entitled The Nutshack began airing on Myx. It would air on the channel for two seasons and would be distributed by Koch Entertainment and ABS-CBN International. Although the series' reviews were generally negative, it built a small cult following from its reputation in late 2016 based on remixes of its theme song on YouTube, which became an internet meme. The show's first season was released as a DVD, titled The Nutshack - The Entire 1st Season: Uncensored & Uncut, from distributor Koch Entertainment, on April 7, 2009, in the United States, and April 14 in Canada.

== Events ==
Myx TV has produced several events, including the award-winning Myx Mash, which was held on May 22, 2010, at the Bill Graham Civic Auditorium in San Francisco featuring performances by Bruno Mars, Brown Eyed Girls, and T-Pain, Myx TV's K-pop TaKeover, the first K-pop dance convention in the United States featuring top K-pop choreographers Movement Lifestyle and America's Best Dance Crew winners Poreotics, Myx Loaded, a live performance show featuring YouTube artists in University of California, Davis, Myx TV Presents: Introducing Victor King and the YTF Crew, a live performance show in Los Angeles, and "AJ Rafael & Friends" Christmas Special in Irvine, California.

== Recognitions ==
- Outstanding Multicultural Marketing for Myx Mash, 2011 CableFAXIES Awards.
- Special Recognition Award from the City and County of San Francisco, 2013 Asian Heritage Awards.
- Guilty Addiction of the Year for Eat Your Words, 6th Annual Taste Awards.
- Third Place, Digital Marketing Tactics for I'm Asian American and..., 2014 NAMIC EMMA Awards.
- Bronze for Making of MYX-Rated: The Documentary, 2012 Telly Awards
- General manager Miguel Santos was named a Luminarie at the National Association for Multi-Ethnicity in Communications at the 2017 class of Next Generation Leaders and Luminaries.
- Nomination for the Cablefax Program Awards for My Motto: Veteran's Edition from Comcast CN100.
