= Sofia Andres =

Filipino actress and model (born 1998)

- Born: Sofia Louise Alejandre Andres; August 24, 1998 (age 28); Manila, Philippines
- Occupation: Actress
- Years active: 2008–present
- Agent: Star Magic (2012–present)
- Partner: Daniel Miranda (2017–present)
- Children: 1

Sofia Louise Alejandre Andres (born August 24, 1998) is a Filipino actress. After appearing in several television commercials as a child, she first appeared as an actress at age 14 in the hit series, Princess and I. She has since gained both critical and commercial praise for her performances in a string of successful film and television series such as: She's Dating the Gangster (2014), Bagani (2018), Pusong Ligaw (2017) and Relaks, It's Just Pag-ibig (2014).

She was recognized by Tatler as one of the most stylish Filipino personalities in Asia. She was also invited as a presenter at the Web TV Asia Awards 2016 at the Korea International Exhibition Centre (KINTEX) in Seoul, South Korea. In 2022, she was handpicked as the brand ambassadress of the personal care brand Sooper Beaute.

== Personal life ==
She only finished secondary school. In her youth, her parents, Eric and Monette Alejandre-Andres, including her 2 siblings, Ian and Bryan Alejandre Andres shared a small room. Eventually, her parents parted ways. At age 3, in 2001, she started joining auditions, VTSs and casting calls in Makati. She was given minor roles, such as 'third wheel' or ‘kontrabida.’ Monette sent her and Daniel to Australia. "I was only 20 years old [when I got pregnant]," she lamented.

In Karen Davila’s vlog, Andres revealed in October 2022, the groundbreaking of a Scandinavian styled second home at Lipa, Batangas for her mother, Monette. A painter and interior designer, she personally designed the interior.

She is close to co-Star Magic artist Michelle Vito, Claire Ruiz and Elisse Joson with whom she considers as her best friends. On March 26, 2015, she finished her high school education at ADT Montessori School located in Pasig.

In an interview with The Hive Asia, Andres stated that she has been suffering from anxiety disorder throughout her career.

Diego Loyzaga confirmed to Aiko Melendez' YouTube vlog that Andres became his TOTGA, or "the one that got away." "I made a really big mistake. I was a kid. I was 20, 21 years old," he added, adding their breakup in 2018. She has a daughter, named Zoe Natalia (born November 24, 2019) with her boyfriend, race car driver Daniel Miranda.

== Career ==
Andres started as a commercial model for various brands such as Angel Evaporada and KFC. After that she was discovered by her current manager Egay Cueblo and was then cast as Dindi Maghirang, the kind-hearted younger adopted sister of Kathryn Bernardo in the hit series Princess and I starring Bernardo, Daniel Padilla, Enrique Gil and Khalil Ramos.

In 2013, Andres portrayed the role of Claire in the hit movie She's the One together with Enrique Gil, Liza Soberano, Dingdong Dantes and Bea Alonzo.

Her breakthrough role came in 2014 when she played the role of Athena Abigail Tizon in the blockbuster movie She's Dating the Gangster with Kathryn Bernardo and Daniel Padilla.

Also in 2014, she was cast in her first lead role through the movie Relaks, It's Just Pag-Ibig alongside Iñigo Pascual, Julian Estrada and Ericka Villongco. Her performance in the said film was praised by critics, citing her as one of the actresses to look forward to.

She portrayed the role of Katherine "Kate" Saavedra in the hit TV series Forevermore alongside Enrique Gil and Liza Soberano.

In July 2016, it was confirmed that Andres will be reuniting with her Forevermore co-star Diego Loyzaga in the TV series Pusong Ligaw. This project serves as her first leading role in a TV series.

She appears in The Iron Heart as Nyx Bonifacio, a femme fatale and the love interest of the main antagonist, Eros, played by Jake Cuenca.

== Filmography ==
=== Film ===
Year	Title	Role
2013	She's the One	Claire
2014	She's Dating the Gangster	Athena Abigail Tizon
2014	Relaks, It's Just Pag-ibig	Sari
2015	Walang Forever	Cameo appearance
2017	My Ex and Why's	Lady Customer
2017	Pwera Usog	Jean
2017	Our Mighty Yaya	Marla
2017	Bloody Crayons	Marie Ragma
2018	Mama's Girl	Abby Potpot
2018	Kahit Ayaw Mo Na	Trixie
2019	Open	Mia

=== Television series ===
Year	Title	Role	Notes	Ref(s)
2012–2013	Princess and I	Dindi Maghirang		
2013	Maalaala Mo Kaya	young Tessa	Episode: "Kamison"	
2013	Maalaala Mo Kaya	Friend	Episode: "Singsing"	
2014	Maalaala Mo Kaya	Angie's Friend	Episode: "Kwintas"	
2014	Maalaala Mo Kaya	Ylette	Episode: "Stars"	
2014	Forevermore	Katherine "Kate" Saavedra		
2014–present	ASAP XP	Herself / Performer		
2015	Maalaala Mo Kaya	Joy	Episode: "Sanggol"	
2015	Wansapanataym	Carla	Episode: "My Kung Fu Chinito"	
2015	Ipaglaban Mo!	Maxine Castillo	Episode: "Sigaw Ng Katarungan"	
2015	Luv U	Bea Tipol		
2015	Maalaala Mo Kaya	teenage Prima	Episode: "Binatana"	
2016	Maalaala Mo Kaya	Jessica Marie "Aika" Robredo	Episode: "Toothbrush"	
2016	Maalaala Mo Kaya	Roselle	Episode: "Pantalan"	
2017	Maalaala Mo Kaya	Khriszandra "Sandra" Reyes	Episode: "Cellphone"	
2017–2018	Pusong Ligaw	Vida Verdadero		
2018	Bagani	Mayari		
2018	Maalaala Mo Kaya	Angel	Episode: "Singsing"	
2019	Wansapanataym	Rachel	Episode: Mr. "CUTEpido"	
2019	Ipaglaban Mo!	Jessica Serafin	Episode: "Paasa"	
2020–2022	La Vida Lena	Rachel Suarez		
2022–2023	The Iron Heart	Nyx Bonifacio		
2024	Jack & Jill sa Diamond Hills	Ernalyn / Anne		
2025	It's Okay to Not Be Okay	Jillian	Episode: "Once Upon a Same Day"	
2025	The Alibi	Claudia Montenegro-Cabrera		
2026	The Loyalty Game	Elizabeth "Beth" Valdez		

=== Music video appearances ===
Year	Title	Artist	Album	Ref(s)
2012	"Kung Ako Na Lang Sana"	Khalil Ramos	Khalil Ramos	
2014	"Till I Met You"	Angeline Quinto	She's Dating the Gangster OST	
2014	"Buko"	Iñigo Pascual and Julian Estrada	Relaks, It's Just Pag-ibig soundtrack	

== Awards and nominations ==
Year	Award giving body	Category	Work	Results	Ref.
2014	Star Cinema Online Awards	Most Promising Actress	She's Dating the Gangster	Nominated	
2015	PMPC Star Awards for Movies	Female Star of the Night	—N/a	Won	
2015	PMPC Star Awards for Movies	New Movie Actress of the Year	Relaks, It's Just Pag-Ibig	Won	
2015	GMMSF Box-Office Entertainment Awards	Most Promising Loveteam (with Iñigo Pascual)	Relaks, It's Just Pag-Ibig	Won	
2015	63rd FAMAS Awards	German Moreno Youth Achievement Award	—N/a	Won	
2015	29th PMPC Star Awards for Television	Best Drama Supporting Actress	Forevermore	Nominated	
