= Iñigo Pascual =

Filipino singer, songwriter, and actor (born 1997)

- Born: Iñigo Dominic Lazaro Pascual; September 14, 1997 (age 29); Manila, Philippines
- Occupations: Actor; singer; songwriter
- Years active: 2006–present
- Agents: Star Magic (2013–present); Cornerstone Entertainment (2014–present); TV5 Network (2021–present); Advanced Media Broadcasting System (2024–present)
- Father: Piolo Pascual
- Relatives: Benjamin Alves (cousin)
- Musical career
- Genres: Pinoy pop, OPM
- Label: Tarsier Records

Iñigo Dominic Lazaro Pascual (Tagalog: [ɪˈɲigɔ pɐsˈkwal]; born September 14, 1997) is a Filipino actor, singer and songwriter. He is popularly known for his 2016 hit single, "Dahil Sa'yo", the first number one song on Billboard Philippines' Philippine Top 20 chart, which also won "Song of the Year" at the 30th Awit Awards. He is the son of actor Piolo Pascual.

== Early life ==
Iñigo Dominic Lazaro Pascual was born on September 14, 1997, in Manila, Philippines as the son of actor Piolo Pascual with ex-partner, Donnabelle Lazaro. Pascual moved to the United States with his mother when he was 8 years old. At the age of 17, he moved back to the Philippines to pursue his career in entertainment.

== Career ==
=== 2014–2015: Career beginnings ===
Pascual's first lead role in film came in 2014 when he starred in the teen romance film Relaks, It's Just Pag-ibig, which was directed by Antoinette Jadaone and Irene Villamor. He played the role of Josh Brillantes, a teenage boy who joined in the journey of a girl who wanted to meet a pair of lovers during a blue moon after she picked up a love letter written by a man named Elias. Piolo Pacual, Iñigo's father, has a special participation in the film as the mysterious letter writer, Elias. The film was produced by Spring Films and distributed by Star Cinema.

In 2015, Pascual starred in another teen romance film, Para sa Hopeless Romantic alongside James Reid, Nadine Lustre, and Julia Barretto. The film was directed by Andoy Ranay and was based on the Marcelo Santos III's bestselling novel of the same name. Pascual played the role of Ryan Sebastian, a fictional character from a story written by Becca, Lustre's character. Pascual then starred in Mae Cruz-Alviar's Crazy Beautiful You with another pair of popular loveteam, Kathryn Bernardo and Daniel Padilla. He played the role of Marcus Alcantara, the stepbrother of Padilla's character who had feelings for Bernardo's character.

After appearing in several episodes of anthology shows such as Maalaala Mo Kaya and Wansapanataym, Pascual landed a role in the afternoon drama series, And I Love You So. He starred in the series alongside Miles Ocampo, Julia Barretto, Dimples Romana, and Angel Aquino. He played the role of Justin Santiago, who was a love interest for both Ocampo's and Barretto's characters.

=== 2016–2018: Breakthrough in music ===
In 2016, Pascual released his self-titled debut album under Star Music, which included the hit single Dahil Sa'Yo. The song became the first number 1 track of the short-lived Billboard Philippines Top 20 chart. In 2017, Pascual was tapped by Disney Philippines to record the Philippine version of "Remember Me," the theme song from Disney-Pixar's animated movie, Coco. In 2019, Pascual released his first international solo single, Options. The track was produced by LA-based instrumentalist Bernard "HARV" Harvey. On May 6, 2020, amidst the COVID-19 pandemic, Pascual was featured in 88rising's online music festival called Asia Rising Forever. During the livestream event, Pascual performed a cover of Post Malone's Better Now. In June 2020, Pascual appeared as a musical act in Filipino-American stand-up comedian Jo Koy's Netflix special entitled Jo Koy: In HIs Elements.

=== American television debut ===
On September 15, 2021, Deadline Hollywood announced that Pascual had joined the cast of Fox drama series Monarch in his American television debut.

== Personal life ==
Pascual currently lives in Los Angeles, California, United States. In January 2025, he and his family evacuated their home due to the wildfires.

== Filmography ==
=== Film ===
Year	Title	Role	Ref.
2007	Paano Kita Iibigin	Young Lance	
2014	Relaks, It's Just Pag-ibig	Josh Brillantes	
2015	Para sa Hopeless Romantic	Ryan Sebastian	
2015	Crazy Beautiful You	Marcus Alcantara	
2016	Ang Babae sa Septic Tank 2: ForeverisNotEnough	Himself	
2019	I'm Ellenya L.	Peng	
2020	Jo Koy: In His Element	Himself	
2020	Boyette: Not a Girl Yet	Charles	
2024	Homestead	Young man who detonated nuclear bomb	
2025	Fatherland		

=== Television ===
Year	Title	Role
2014	Maalaala Mo Kaya: Diary	Christian
2015–present	ASAP	Himself / performer
2015	Maalaala Mo Kaya: Banana Split	Trevor
2015	Wansapanataym: Wish Upon A Lusis	JP
2015–2016	And I Love You So	Justin Santiago
2017	The Voice Teens	Himself / host
2017	Maalaala Mo Kaya: Tape Recorder	Allan
2018–2019	My Myx	Himself / VJ
2018–2019	Myx Daily Top 10	Himself / VJ
2018–2019	Myx International Top 20	Himself / VJ
2018–2019	Myx Versions	Himself / VJ
2018–2019	Pinoy Myx	Himself / VJ
2018–2019	Pop Myx	Himself / VJ
2019	2019 SEA Games Opening Ceremony	Himself / performer
2019	Myx Daily Top 10	Himself / VJ
2021	The Crossover	Guest
2022	Monarch	Ace Grayson
2024	It's Showtime	Himself / performer
2026	The Good Doctor	Dong

== Discography ==
Albums
Year	Album title	Recording label	Certification	Ref.
2016	Iñigo Pascual	Star Music	—N/a	

Singles
Year	Song title	Album	Composer	Company
2014	"Buko" (with Julian Estrada)	Relaks, It's Just Pag-Ibig Soundtrack	Jireh Lim	Star Music
2015	"Lullabye-Bye"	OPM Fresh	David Dimaguila	Star Music
2016	"Dahil Sa'Yo" (with Kira Balinger)	Iñigo Pascual	Himself	Star Music
2016	"Binibini"	Iñigo Pascual	Jonathan Manalo	Star Music
2016	"Dito"	Iñigo Pascual	Himself	Star Music
2016	"That Hero" (feat. Kidwolf and Theo...)	Iñigo Pascual	Jonathan Manalo	Star Music
2016	"Fallen"	Iñigo Pascual	Himself	Star Music
2016	"Your Love"	Iñigo Pascual	Shorya Shorma & Samuel Simpson	Star Music
2016	"Ikaw at Ako"	Iñigo Pascual	Gabriel Tagadtad	Star Music
2016	"Live Life Brighter"	Iñigo Pascual	Miles Blue Sy	Star Music
2016	"Dito" (Acoustic Version)	Iñigo Pascual	Himself	Star Music
2016	"Lullabye-Bye"	Iñigo Pascual	David Dimaguila	Star Music
2017	"Extensyon" (feat. Aikee)	Himig Handog	Michael "Aikee" Aplacador	Star Music
2017	"Remember Me"	Coco (Original Motion Picture Soundtrack) PH Version	Kristen Anderson-Lopez & Robert Lopez	Walt Disney Records
2017	"Paraiso" (with Angelina Cruz)	n/a	n/a	Universal Records (Philippines)
2019	"Options"	Options		Tarsier Records
2019	"Catching Feelings" (feat. Moophs)	Catching Feelings		Tarsier Records
2019	"Love" (by PRETTYMUCH)	INTL:EP	Daniel Klein, Zion Kuwonu, Matt Campfield, Marcus Davis & Brandon Arreaga	Sire Records
2021	"All Out Of Love" (featuring Moophs)	single		Tarsier Records

=== Chart performance ===
Year	Title	Peak (Pinoy Myx Countdown)	Peak (Myx Hit Chart)	Peak (Philippine Top 20)	Peak (Philippine Hot 100)	Album
2016	"Dahil Sa 'Yo"	8	12	1	10	Iñigo Pascual
2017	"Dito"	7	14	–	–	Iñigo Pascual
2017	"Extensyon" (feat. Aikee)	4	–	–	–	Himig Handog 2017
2018	"Lumang Tugtugin"	2	2	–	–	—

=== Songs performed on Monarch ===
- "Family Tradition" (with Joshua Sasse, Anna Friel and Beth Ditto)
- "Photograph" (with Trace Adkins)
- "Watermelon Sugar" (with Emma Milani)

== Awards and nominations ==
Year	Award-granting body	Award title	Nominated work	Result	Ref.
2014	PMPC Star Awards for TV	Male Star of the Night	—N/a	Won	
2015	46th Box-Office Entertainment Awards	Most Promising Loveteam (with Sofia Andres)	Relaks, It's Just Pag-ibig	Won	
2015	PMPC Star Awards for Movies	New Movie Actor of the Year	Relaks, It's Just Pag-ibig	Nominated	
2016	FAMAS Awards	Best Supporting Actor	Para sa Hopeless Romantic	Nominated	
2016	Push Awards	Best Male Celebrity	—N/a	Nominated	
2017	Myx Music Awards	Favorite New Artist	—N/a	Nominated	
2017	Myx Music Awards	Favorite Myx Celebrity VJ	—N/a	Nominated	
2017	Billboard Philippines	First Chart-Topper Artist	Dahil sa 'Yo	Won	
2017	MOR Music Awards	Best New Artist of the Year	Dahil sa 'Yo	Won	
2017	Alta Media Icon Awards	Song of the Year	Dahil sa 'Yo	Won	
2017	7th EdukCircle Awards	Male Music Artist of the Year	—N/a	Won	
2017	Push Awards	Music Artist of the Year	Dahil sa 'Yo	Nominated	
2017	30th Awit Awards	Best Performance by a New Male Recording Artist	Dahil sa 'Yo	Nominated	
2017	30th Awit Awards	Best Pop Recording	Dahil sa 'Yo	Nominated	
2017	30th Awit Awards	Song of the Year	Dahil sa 'Yo	Won	
2017	30th Awit Awards	Album of the Year	Iñigo Pascual	Nominated	
2019	MOR Pinoy Music Awards	Best Male Artist of the Year	Lumang Tugtugin	Nominated	
2019	MOR Pinoy Music Awards	Best Collaboration	"Tayo Na Hindi" with (Maris Racal)	Nominated	
2021	Wish Music Awards	Wishclusive Pop Performance of the Year	Balang Araw	Nominated	
