= Mama's Girl (film) =

- Theatrical release poster
- Directed by: Connie S.A. Macatuno
- Screenplay by: Gina Marissa Tagasa
- Produced by: Lily Monteverde; Roselle Monteverde
- Starring: Sofia Andres; Diego Loyzaga; Jameson Blake; Sylvia Sanchez
- Cinematography: Moises Zee
- Edited by: Chrisel Desuasido
- Music by: Len Calvo; Andrew R. Florentino
- Production company: Regal Entertainment
- Release date: January 17, 2018
- Running time: 110 minutes
- Country: Philippines
- Language: Filipino

Mama's Girl is a 2018 Philippine drama film directed by Connie Macatuno and written by Gina Marissa Tagasa. It stars Sofia Andres, Diego Loyzaga, Jameson Blake, Sylvia Sanchez, Yana Asistio, Heaven Peralejo, Karen Reyes, Arlene Muhlach, Alora Sasam and Afi Africa, among others. It is produced by Regal Entertainment. It is about Abby, an ambitious millennial coming out into the world with the help of her single mother, Mina, an entrepreneur.

== Cast ==
Main

- Sofia Andres as Abby Eduque, an ambitious 21-year-old millennial
- Diego Loyzaga as Nico Sanchez, Abby's childhood friend and an aspiring chef
- Jameson Blake as Zak Montañez, a rock star who is attracted to Abby
- Sylvia Sanchez as Mina Eduque, Abby's Gen X single mom

Secondary

- Yana Asistio as Rhea, one of Abby's best friends
- Heaven Peralejo as Diwa, another one of Abby's best friends
- Karen Reyes as MQ, also one of Abby's best friends
- Arlene Muhlach as Nelia, Mina's business partner and friend, and also Nico's mother
- Alora Sasam as Aleli, a waitress at Mama Mina's Pasta House
- Afi Africa as Vivo, a waiter at Mama Mina's Pasta House
- Lui Manansala as Loti, Abby's grandmother
- Allan Paule as Mario
- Eva Darren as Nenita
- Divine Aucina as Awra

== Release ==
The premiere night of Mama's Girl was on January 15, 2018 in Manila, Philippines. In line with the theme of the film, director Connie Macatuno and most of the cast who attended the event walked the red carpet with their mothers. It was released nationwide in many Philippine cinemas on January 17, 2018.

=== Critical response ===
Mama's Girl was graded 'A' by the Cinema Evaluation Board. Pablo Tariman of The Philippine Star praised Macatuno's directing, noting how she delivered "with simple storytelling that hit the emotional mark without fanfare" and also Sylvia Sanchez's performance as compared to her other roles as mother on TV. Rappler's Oggs Cruz wrote, "Mama's Girl is hardly a perfect film but its subtle but sincere impressions are worth the price of the ticket". He called to attention an apparent lack of influence of men on the main characters and their development, while comparing it to Macatuno's previous film Rome and Juliet, saying that it was "definitely softer" than its predecessor.
