= Dahil Sa'yo =

2016 single by Iñigo Pascual

Single by Iñigo Pascual

from the album Inigo Pascual
- Released: October 7, 2016
- Recorded: 2016
- Studio: Bellhaus Studios, San Juan, Metro Manila
- Genre: Pop
- Length: 3:31
- Label: Star Music
- Songwriters: Iñigo Pascual; Gabriel Tagadtad
- Producer: KidWolf

Iñigo Pascual singles chronology
"Dahil Sa'yo" (2016)	"Dito" (2017)

Music video
- "Dahil Sa'yo" on YouTube

"Dahil Sa'yo" (English: "Because of You") is a single by Filipino singer Iñigo Pascual from his self-titled debut album. The song was released by Star Music on October 7, 2016 and was heard first on radio station MOR 101.9. Its lyric video was uploaded on YouTube on the same date the song was released while its official music video premiered on Myx on December 3, 2016 same date when it was uploaded on YouTube.

It was the first number one song on Billboard Philippines' then-new Philippine Top 20 chart, the music industry standard record chart in the Philippines for local singles.

It is also the most viewed OPM video on YouTube beating "Ikaw" by Yeng Constantino by 73.6 million views.

== Track listing ==
Digital download
No.	Title	Length
1.	"Dahil Sa'Yo"	3:31

== Credits and personnel ==
Credits adapted from YouTube.

- Composer: Inigo Pascual
- Additional Rap Lyrics: Gabriel Tagadtad
- Arrangement: Theo Martel
- Vocal Arrangement: Inigo Pascual, KidWolf
- Mixed by: KidWolf
- Tracking Engineer: Dan Tanedo at Bellhaus Studios

== Music charts ==
The song became the first number-one song of Billboard Philippines' Philippine Top 20 and stayed on top for nine weeks before it was dethroned by the song "Two Less Lonely People in the World" by KZ Tandingan on the week of August 14. As a result, it ranked No. 1 on the Billboard Year End Philippine Top 20 Chart. The song debuted at number 21 on the Philippine Hot 100 and finally reached the top ten in its eighth week of its chart run.

== Charts ==
Chart (2017)	Peak position
Philippines (Philippine Hot 100)	9
Philippines (Philippine Top 20)	1

== Bini version ==
"Dahil Sa‘yo"

Single by Bini
- Released: May 15, 2026
- Genre: Pinoy pop; electropop
- Length: 3:45
- Label: Star
- Songwriters: Iñigo Pascual; Gabriel Tagadtad

Bini singles chronology
"Blush" (2026)	"Dahil Sa‘yo" (2026)	"A Parallel World" (2026)

Music video
- "Dahil Sa‘yo on YouTube

A cover by Filipino girl group Bini was released on May 15, 2026 for the Together Forever commercial for iWant.
