= Connie Macatuno =

Filipino director, producer, screenwriter and artist

- Born: Concepcion S.A. Macatuno
- Education: University of the Philippines
- Occupations: Film director, film producer, writer, artist
- Children: 1

Concepcion "Connie" S.A. Macatuno is a Filipino film and television director, producer, screenwriter and artist.

== Filmography ==
=== Film ===
Year	Film	Credited as			Notes
Year	Film	Director	Writer	Producer	Notes
2006	Rome and Juliet	Yes	Yes	Yes	
2018	Mama's Girl	Yes	No	No	
2018	Wild and Free	Yes	No	No	
2018	Glorious	Yes	Yes	Yes	
2020	Malaya	Yes	Yes	Yes	
2024	Guilty Pleasure	Yes	No	No	

=== Television ===
Year	Show	Credited as			Notes
Year	Show	Director	Writer	Producer	Notes
1999	Martin Late at Night	Yes	No	No	1 episode
2005	Male Confessions	Yes	No	Yes	Documentary
2010	The Substitute Bride	Yes	No	No	10 episodes
2012-2013	Paraiso (Philippine TV series)	Yes	No	No	55 episodes
2022	The Broken Marriage Vow	Yes	No	No	
