= List of 2014 box office number-one films in the Philippines =

This is a list of films which placed number one at the weekend box office for the year 2014 in the Philippines.

== Number-one films ==
†	This implies the highest-grossing movie of the year.

#	Date	Film	Gross (Dollars)	Gross (Peso)	Notes
2	January 12, 2014	47 Ronin	$940,197	₱41,797,680	
3	January 19, 2014	47 Ronin	$433,436	₱19,495,041	
4	January 26, 2014	I, Frankenstein	$381,108	₱17,280,046	
6	February 9, 2014	RoboCop	$1,097,821	₱49,290,187	
7	February 16, 2014	Starting Over Again*	$4,247,708	₱189,000,918	Starting Over Again was the first Filipino film to reach the number one in 2014.
8	February 23, 2014	Starting Over Again*	$1,722,137	₱76,579,988	
9	March 2, 2014	Starting Over Again*	$582,502	₱25,956,872	Starting Over Again became the first Filipino film of 2014 to top the box office for three consecutive weekends.
10	March 9, 2014	300: Rise of an Empire	$1,508,549	₱66,778,335	
11	March 16, 2014	300: Rise of an Empire	$842,337	₱37,571,094	
12	March 23, 2014	Divergent	$745,115	₱33,598,651	
13	March 30, 2014	Captain America: The Winter Soldier	$3,464,755	N/A	
14	April 6, 2014	Captain America: The Winter Soldier	$1,456,960	₱65,387,636	
15	April 13, 2014	Rio 2	$1,455,963	₱63,967,298	
16	April 20, 2014	Rio 2	$398,224	₱17,617,629	
17	April 27, 2014	Rio 2	$273,207	₱12,161,810	The third weekend of Rio 2 currently has the lowest number-one weekend of 2014.
18	May 4, 2014	The Amazing Spider-Man 2 †	$5,645,992	₱251,132,030	The Amazing Spider-Man 2 currently has the highest weekend debut of 2014.
19	May 11, 2014	The Amazing Spider-Man 2 †	$2,095,132	₱91,222,466	
20	May 18, 2014	Godzilla	$2,067,106	₱90,327,364	
21	May 25, 2014	X-Men: Days of Future Past	$4,014,962	N/A	
22	June 1, 2014	Maleficent	$4,110,036	₱179,834,625	
23	June 8, 2014	Maleficent	$1,903,993	₱82,661,856	
24	June 15, 2014	How to Train Your Dragon 2	$1,938,775	₱84,888,876	
25	June 22, 2014	How to Train Your Dragon 2	$791,677	₱34,671,494	
26	June 29, 2014	Transformers: Age of Extinction	$5,721,484	N/A	
27	July 6, 2014	Transformers: Age of Extinction	$2,107,824	₱91,479,562	
28	July 13, 2014	Dawn of the Planet of the Apes	$1,297,558	₱56,284,044	
29	July 20, 2014	She's Dating the Gangster*	$2,643,070	₱114,775,315	She's Dating the Gangster was the second Filipino film to reach the number one in 2014.
30	July 27, 2014	She's Dating the Gangster*	$1,578,096	N/A	
31	August 3, 2014	Guardians of the Galaxy	$2,366,868	₱103,157,575	
32	August 10, 2014	Guardians of the Galaxy	$1,374,137	₱60,280,642	
33	August 17, 2014	Teenage Mutant Ninja Turtles	$1,399,728	₱60,937,158	
34	August 24, 2014	Rurouni Kenshin: Kyoto Taika-hen	$971,984	₱42,533,437	
35	August 31, 2014	Rurouni Kenshin: Kyoto Taika-hen	$338,812	₱14,762,716	
36	September 7, 2014	The Gifted*	$916,485	₱39,817,607	The Gifted was the third Filipino film to date to reach the number one in 2014.
37	September 14, 2014	The Gifted*	$445,051	₱19,238,665	
38	September 21, 2014	The Maze Runner	$1,403,479	₱62,376,922	
39	September 28, 2014	Rurouni Kenshin: Densetsu no Saiga-hen	$926,087	₱41,058,345	
40	October 5, 2014	Annabelle	$1,195,721	₱53,669,818	
41	October 12, 2014	Annabelle	$919,931	₱41,103,345	
42	October 19, 2014	Dracula Untold	$1,002,183	₱44,810,709	
43	October 26, 2014	The Best of Me	$492,078	₱21,993,426	
44	November 2, 2014	Ouija	$402,463	₱17,886,019	
45	November 9, 2014	Big Hero 6	$1,554,503	₱69,572,093	
46	November 16, 2014	Big Hero 6	$1,334,630	₱59,805,705	

*means of Philippine origin.

== Total gross ==
#	Release date	Film	Total Gross	Notes
1	April 30, 2014	The Amazing Spider-Man 2	$10,211,056	
2	June 25, 2014	Transformers: Age of Extinction	$9,960,703	
3	February 12, 2014	Starting Over Again*	$9,096,712	
4	May 28, 2014	Maleficent	$8,119,469	
5	January 15, 2014	Bride for Rent*	$7,348,239	
6	March 26, 2014	Captain America: The Winter Soldier	$7,048,065	
7	May 21, 2014	X-Men: Days of Future Past	$7,027,854	
8	July 16, 2014	She's Dating the Gangster*	$5,837,612	
9	November 20, 2014	The Hunger Games: Mockingjay - Part 1	$5,652,411	
10	July 31, 2014	Guardians of the Galaxy	$5,382,807	

*Local Film
