= She's Dating the Gangster =

2014 romantic comedy-drama film by Cathy Garcia-Molina

- Theatrical movie poster
- Directed by: Cathy Garcia-Molina
- Written by: Carmi Raymundo; Charlene Grace Bernardo
- Based on: She's Dating the Gangster by Bianca Bernardino
- Produced by: Charo Santos-Concio; Malou N. Santos
- Starring: Daniel Padilla; Kathryn Bernardo
- Cinematography: Dan Villegas
- Edited by: Jojo Racal
- Music by: Francis S. Concio
- Production companies: Star Cinema; Summit Media
- Distributed by: ABS-CBN Film Productions
- Release date: July 16, 2014
- Running time: 113 minutes
- Country: Philippines
- Language: Filipino
- Box office: ₱296 million

She's Dating the Gangster is a 2014 Philippine coming-of-age romantic comedy drama film directed by Cathy Garcia-Molina from a story and screenplay written by Carmi G. Raymundo and Charlene Grace Bernardo, based on the Pop Fiction book of the same name originally published on CandyMag.com's Teen Talk section, which was popularized on Wattpad by Bianca Bernardino under her pen name SGwannaB. The film stars Kathryn Bernardo and Daniel Padilla, together with Dawn Zulueta and Richard Gomez in their first film since Saan Ka Man Naroroon two decades prior.

A co-production between ABS-CBN Film Productions (who also handled the distribution) and Summit Media, it was theatrically released on July 16, 2014, as part of its 20th founding anniversary presentation.

== Plot ==
During a wedding reception, Kenji delos Reyes delivers a speech, only for his son Kenneth to cause a scene, to Kenji's disappointment. Kenneth expresses his long-held resentment toward his father and reveals he wishes he had died instead of his late mother.

The next morning, Kenneth learns that the plane to Bicol his father was aboard has crashed. He rushes to the airport to see the list of survivors and encounters Kelay, who claims Kenji is her father. Confused, Kenneth asserts that he is Kenji’s only child and that his father is married to Athena Abigail delos Reyes. In response, Kelay shows him an old photograph of a young Kenji with a girl who closely resembles her. She reveals that the girl is her aunt, Athena Dizon, whom she describes as Kenji’s "great love", and insists that Kenji must be found and informed of Athena’s terminal illness to give her closure. Though skeptical, Kenneth is unable to secure a bus ticket to Legazpi due to the Holy Week rush. Kelay returns with tickets for both of them, and during the trip, she begins recounting the story of Kenji and Athena’s past.

In the 1990s, Kenji was a feared "gangster" at school, heartbroken over his ex-girlfriend, Athena Abigail "Abi". Wanting to win Abi back, Kenji sends messages to her pager, but they are mistakenly received by another student, Athena Dizon. After meeting and realizing the mix-up, Kenji unexpectedly kisses Athena and demands she pose as his girlfriend to make Abi jealous. Despite his bullying and pressure, Athena initially resists but agrees after Kenji threatens to jump off the school rooftop. Athena receives special attention at school as Kenji's girlfriend, while Kenji protects her from jealous bullies. Over time, the pretend relationship develops into a genuine connection, and they eventually confess their feelings for each other.

As Kelay recounts the story, Kenneth begins to question his resentment toward his father. He and Kelay also become drawn to each other. Later, they learn that the plane has crashed in Camarines Sur with survivors; arriving there, Kenneth asks Kelay why his father and Athena never ended up together. Kelay explains that it was “a big case of bad timing” and reveals that their relationship ended after their trip to Bicol.

During that trip, Kenji brings Athena to Mayon volcano and promises they will return to marry there someday. Athena, hiding her heart condition, half-jokingly tells him she will try not to die. Upon returning to Manila, her father scolds her for leaving and urges her to end the relationship. Athena apologizes but insists Kenji give her the strength to keep living. After that day, Kenji abruptly stopped attending school, leaving Athena and their friends concerned. In the present, their friend Lucas contacts Kenneth and drives him and Kelay to help search for Kenji.

During the drive, Lucas explains that Kenji once asked him to bring Athena to the hospital, where she found Abi suffering from gastric cancer. Athena later learns that Abi ended her relationship with Kenji to spare him from the burden of her illness. Lucas admits to pursuing Abi in the past despite knowing she still loved Kenji. Upon waking, Abi apologizes to Athena and asks her to look after Kenji, who had been informed of Abi's condition and pleaded with her mother to give Abi a reason to keep living. Wanting Abi to survive and be happy, Athena breaks up with Kenji. She later departs for the United States, while Kenji marries Abi, and they conceive Kenneth. Kelay and Kenneth are left shaken by the revelations when Kelay receives a call informing her that Athena is in her final moments. As they part ways, Kenneth promises Kelay that Athena and Kenji will see each other again.

Kenneth finds his father in a hospital, where an orderly hands him Kenji’s belongings, including a letter. In it, Kenji explains he traveled to Legazpi to say goodbye to memories of Athena and to atone for his shortcomings to Abi and Kenneth. When Kenji awakens, they reconcile.

Days later, Kenneth brings Kenji to a house to reunite with old friends. To Kenji’s surprise, Athena is wheeled out by Kelay. Athena, now gravely ill, tells Kenji that his love helped her keep going and dies peacefully in his arms.

Some time later, Kelay receives a call reporting that a flight carrying Kenneth, now her boyfriend, is missing. Distressed, she rushes to the airport and causes a scene, only for Kenneth to appear moments later, alive. Kenji also arrives and reveals he made the call. Kenneth then asks Kelay if they can have a great love story like Kenji and Athena.

== Cast ==
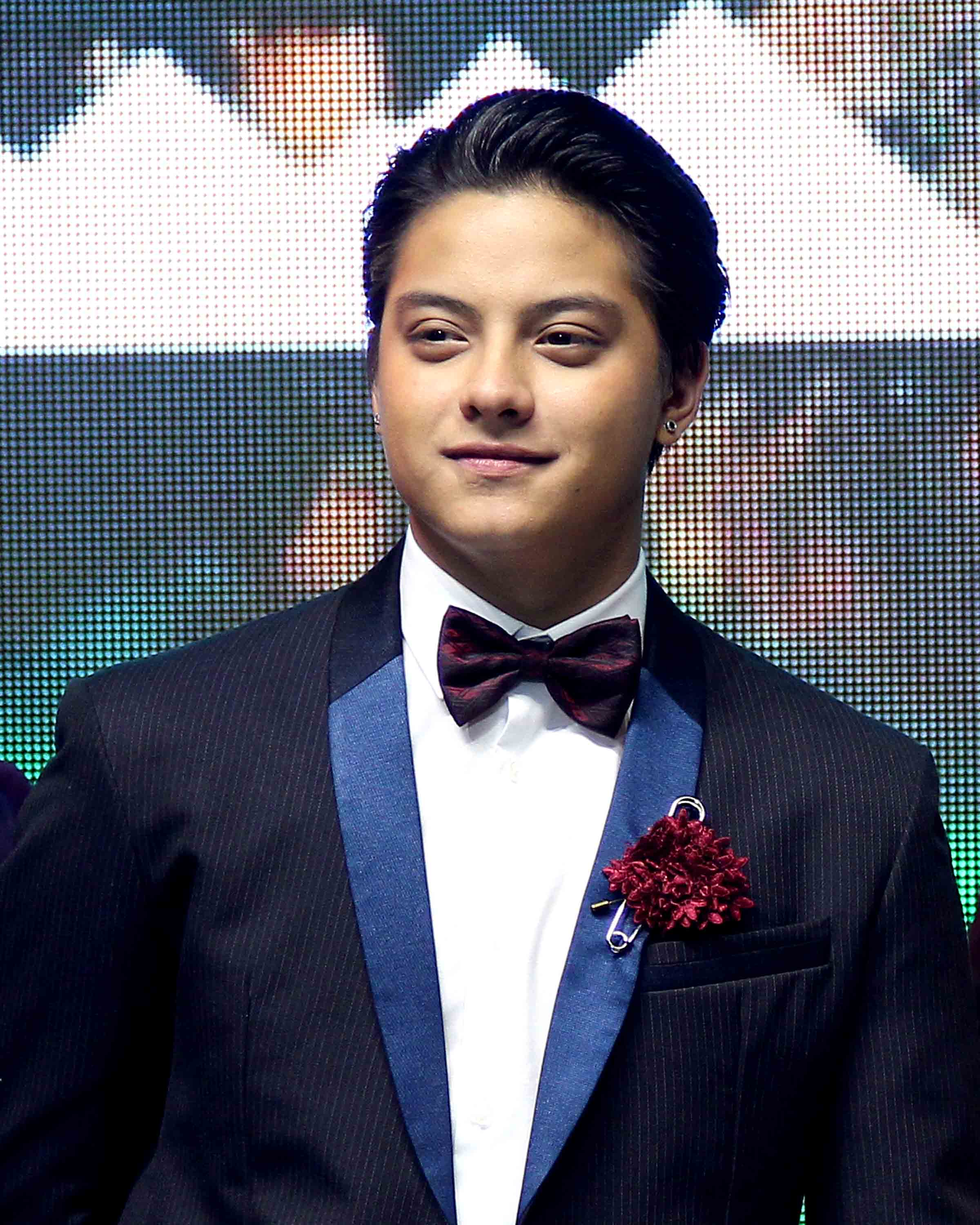
Daniel Padilla portrays young Kenji Delos Reyes/Kenneth Delos Reyes.

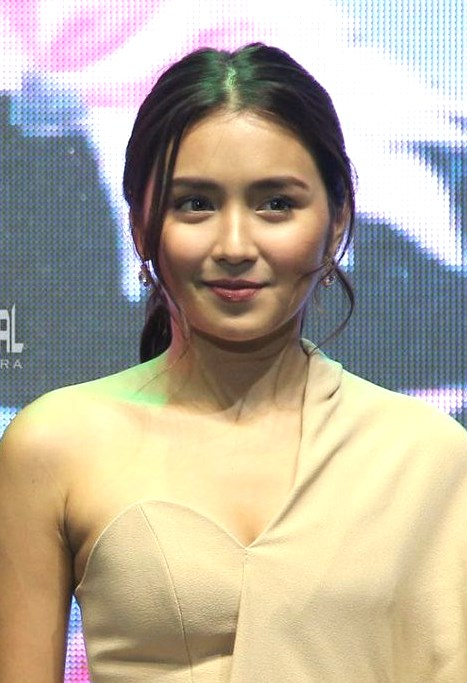
Kathryn Bernardo portrays young Athena Dizon/Kelay Dizon.

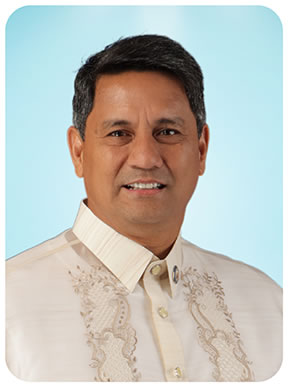
Richard Gomez portrays present Kenji Delos Reyes.

- Daniel Padilla as young Kenji Delos Reyes/Kenneth Delos Reyes
  - Richard Gomez as present Kenji Delos Reyes
- Kathryn Bernardo as young Athena Dizon/Kelay Dizon
  - Dawn Zulueta as present Athena Dizon
- Sofia Andres as Athena Abigail Tizon-Delos Reyes
- Khalil Ramos as young Lucas Lazaro
  - Ian Veneracion as present Lucas Lazaro
- Pamu Pamorada as Sara Jung
- John Uy as young Mickey
  - William Lorenzo as present Mickey
- Ynna Asistio as young Grace Matic
  - Yayo Aguila as present Grace Matic
- Igi Boy Flores as young Kirby Araneta
  - Niño Muhlach as present Kirby Araneta
- Marco Gumabao as young Stephen
  - Ramon Christopher as present Stephen
- Alexander Diaz as young Jigs
  - Allan Paule as present Jigs
- Eslove Briones as Sara's date
- Joe Vargas as Gang Leader
- Elisse Joson as Mean Girl
- Arnold Reyes as Gerry, Athena's dad
  - Alfonso Deza as present Athena's dad
- Niña Dolino as Athena's stepmom
  - Chiqui del Carmen as present Athena's stepmom
- Rio Locsin as Abigail's mom
- Kobi Vidanes as Carl
- Justin Gonzales as Nathan
- Julian Estrada as Jet
- Kevin Fowler as Barry
- Mel Kimura as Professor

Several actors and actresses also made their cameo appearance in the film–including Karen Reyes as Bridesmaid, Matutina as Nana Buding, Hyubs Azarcon as Truck Driver, Pooh as News Reporter, Jojit Lorenzo and JM De Guzman as Airline Officers, Rayver Cruz, Patrick Sugui, Carl Ravanes, and Rasheed Rivero as the basketball players, Joross Gamboa and Ketchup Eusebio as the Coach, Janus del Prado as the Bus Ticket Vendor, Joem Bascon as hair stylist, Gerry Bricenio as Bus Conductor, and Olivia Cruz as the Doctor.

== Release ==
Due to the film's huge success, it was screened internationally in selected countries like United States, Canada, Australia, and United Arab Emirates. The film grossed $222,000 after 3 days of showing in North America and after 10 days, the cumulative total was $570,000. The total gross, from the 2-week US and 3-week Canada screenings as well as the Middle East, Australia, New Zealand and Singapore screenings, is yet to be determined.

== Reception ==
=== Critical response ===
Philbert Ortiz-Dy of Click the City gave a positive review in the film, stating that She's Dating the Gangster is at its best when it allows kids to be kids. Its portrayal of young, intensely romantic love is really charming, especially placed as it is in this wacky conception of its period setting. He also stated that "The narrative just can't support this pathos. The film begins to apply fantasy logic to really serious topics. [...] This kind of magical thinking just doesn’t mesh well with the real medical terms that the film just trots out."

=== Box office ===
According to Star Cinema's advertising manager Mico del Rosario, the film gathered ₱15 million (US$340,000) on its first day of showing. The film grossed ₱251 million in the Philippines per the Annual Report filed by ABS-CBN to the SEC. The worldwide box office of the film is at ₱296 million. With a total gross of $5,837,612, the movie hit No. 8 on the 2014 Philippine Yearly Box Office.

== See also ==
- List of 2014 box office number-one films in the Philippines
- List of Philippine films based on Wattpad stories
