= Our Mighty Yaya =

- Theatrical release poster
- Directed by: Jose Javier Reyes
- Written by: Jose Javier Reyes
- Produced by: Lily Y. Monteverde; Jose Javier Reyes
- Starring: Ai-Ai delas Alas; Megan Young; Zoren Legazpi; Sofia Andres
- Cinematography: Patrick Layugan
- Edited by: Charliebebs Gohetia
- Music by: Jesse Lucas
- Production companies: Regal Entertainment; Regal Multimedia, Inc.
- Distributed by: GMA Films
- Release date: May 17, 2017
- Running time: 99 minutes
- Country: Philippines
- Language: Filipino

Our Mighty Yaya (transl. Our Mighty Nanny) is a 2017 Philippine family comedy film written and directed by Jose Javier Reyes. The film stars Ai-Ai delas Alas as Virgie, a hideous-looking but sympathetic woman from the province, who hires as a nanny for a well-to-do family in Manila. Supporting roles feature Zoren Legaspi, Megan Young, Sofia Andres, Lucas Magallano, and Alyson McBride. Produced by Regal Multimedia, Inc. and Regal Entertainment, the film was released on May 17, 2017. The film was distributed by GMA Pictures.

== Plot ==
Determined to send her son to college, an unfortunate-looking woman becomes a nanny for a wealthy family in Manila, where she overcomes ridicule to befriend her employers' children and inspire the family through her benevolence and humility.

== Cast and characters ==
- Ai-Ai delas Alas as Virginia "Virgie" Redoble, a hideous-looking woman from a Filipino province who leaves home to serve as a nanny for the Sevilla family in Manila.
- Zoren Legaspi as Antonio "Tonichi" Sevilla, a business tycoon and a widower.
- Megan Young as Monique Sevilla, Tonichi's fiancée.
- Sofia Andres as Marla Sevilla, Tonichi's eldest daughter.
- Lucas Magallano as Kevin Sevilla, Tonichi's only son.
- Alyson McBride as Peachy Sevilla, Tonichi's young daughter.
- Beverly Salviejo as Manang Bibing
- Mitoy Yonting as Oscar "Oca" Redoble

== Theme ==
Director Jose Javier Reyes said,

"I [want to] do a movie that pays tribute to these people who we think are just there because of the salary. It's about the love they give to the people they live with… Our Mighty Yaya [is about the] men and women who sacrifice [and] give love to other families' children for them to sustain their own families."

== Production ==
On April 13, 2016, Reyes announced that he would direct the film. In addition, lead star Ai-Ai delas Alas posted a photo of the ensemble cast on Instagram, confirming the appearances of GMA exclusive actors Zoren Legaspi, Megan Young, Sofia Andres, and two child actors Lucas Magallano and Alyson McBride in the film. The film was originally titled as My Mighty Yaya.

During a press conference in May 2017, Reyes said he wrote the screenplay after receiving a Facebook message from the granddaughter of his dying childhood nanny, asking him to pay her a visit.

== Marketing ==
Our Mighty Yaya's official trailer was released on April 18, 2017, by Regal Entertainment. As of April 27, the film's Facebook page has generated 1.5 million views. Televised Promotions was aired on GMA Network.

== Release ==
Our Mighty Yaya was originally planned as Regal's official competing entry at the 2016 Metro Manila Film Festival, an annual film festival held every December in the Philippines. The producers, however (led by Lily Monteverde), failed to reach the deadline for submission of the film's picture lock version on November 2, as per MMFF's requirement. Rather, another film distributed by Regal, Mano Po 7: Tsinoy, was locked in to compete for the MMFF. The film had its premiere on May 17, 2017.

== Reception ==
Reception for Our Mighty Yaya has been negative upon release, with critics noting its tired and clichéd plot as well as its stock characters. Oggs Cruz of Rappler called it "a movie that has given up in both originality and ambition," as well as "unapologetically generic and predictable," and a "humdrum and routinary to really be memorably entertaining." Furthermore, Cruz opined that the film merely serves as a starring vehicle for Ai-Ai delas Alas. Philbert Dy of The Neighborhood felt similarly, while also taking notice of unconvincing performances by Megan Young and delas Alas; he gave an overall rating of 2.5 out of 5.
