= Guilty Pleasure (film) =

- Directed by: Connie Macatuno
- Written by: Noreen Capili
- Starring: Lovi Poe, JM De Guzman, Jameson Blake
- Production companies: C'est Lovi Productions; Regal Entertainment
- Distributed by: Regal Films
- Release date: October 16, 2024
- Running time: 59 minutes
- Country: Philippines
- Language: Filipino

Guilty Pleasure is a 2024 Filipino romantic drama film directed by Connie Macatuno, written by Noreen Capili, and produced by C'est Lovi Productions in partnership with Regal Entertainment. The film stars Lovi Poe, JM De Guzman, Jameson Blake, Soliman Cruz, and Sarah Edwards.

== Premise ==
The story centers on the intertwined lives of three ambitious lawyers who must navigate complex relationships, temptation, betrayal, and the pursuit of ambition—testing their ethical limits and personal loyalties.

== Cast ==
- Lovi Poe as Alexis
- JM De Guzman as Adam
- Jameson Blake as Matthew
- Soliman Cruz as Renante
- Sarah Edwards as Kate

== Production ==
Guilty Pleasure is produced by actress-producer Lovi Poe's company, C’est Lovi Productions, in collaboration with Regal Entertainment. It is one of Poe's first self-produced mainstream feature projects. Poe described the film as "very adult, very sexy" and said it was intended to push creative boundaries in local storytelling.

== Release ==
The film premiered theatrically in the Philippines on October 16, 2024, and became available internationally via Netflix release on March 12, 2025. The film became Number One on the Netflix charts in the Philippines.

== Accolades ==
Accolades received by Guilty Pleasures
Year	Award	Category	Recipient(s)	Result	Ref.
2025	8th EDDYS Awards	Best Original Theme Song	“Luha Sa Dilim” by Yanco	Pending	
2025	48th Gawad Urian Awards	Best Actress	Lovi Poe	Nominated	
