= The Broken Marriage Vow =

Philippine television drama series

- Season 1 title card
- Genre: Melodrama; Romance; Psychological thriller
- Based on: Doctor Foster by Mike Bartlett
- Written by: Kay Conlu-Brondial; Bridgette Ann Rebuca; Jayson Arvene Mondragon; Jameela Bea Sunga; Mike Bartlett
- Directed by: Connie Macatuno; Andoy Ranay
- Starring: Jodi Sta. Maria; Zanjoe Marudo; Sue Ramirez; Zaijian Jaranilla
- Music by: Len Calvo; Adriane Macalipay
- Country of origin: Philippines
- Original languages: Filipino; English
- No. of seasons: 2
- No. of episodes: 107

Production
- Executive producers: Carlo L. Katigbak; Cory V. Vidanes; Laurenti M. Dyogi; Roldeo T. Endrinal
- Producers: Hazel Bolisay Parfan; Ronald Dantes Atianzar
- Production locations: Baguio, Benguet; La Union
- Camera setup: Single-camera
- Running time: 35 minutes
- Production companies: Dreamscape Entertainment; BBC Studios (Note: copyright holder only)

Original release
- Network: Kapamilya Channel (Note: The series was also aired on A2Z, Jeepney TV, TV5 and internationally through The Filipino Channel. It is also available on-demand in advanced episodes via iWantTFC and Viu.)
- Release: January 24 – June 24, 2022

Related
- Doctor Foster

The Broken Marriage Vow is a Philippine television drama thriller series broadcast by Kapamilya Channel. The series is based on the British drama series from BBC One, Doctor Foster. Directed by Connie Macatuno and Andoy Ranay, it stars Jodi Sta. Maria, Zanjoe Marudo, Sue Ramirez, and Zaijian Jaranilla. It premiered on the network's Primetime Bida line up on January 24, 2022. The series concluded on June 24, 2022, with a total of 2 seasons and 107 episodes.

== Synopsis ==
The plot focuses on the challenges faced by the Illustre family following the revelation of infidelity and broken trust by the husband, David.

Dr. Jill Illustre's (Jodi Sta. Maria) life unravels when she discovers her husband, David (Zanjoe Marudo), is having an affair. His mistress, Lexy Lucero (Sue Ramirez), is the daughter of one of her patients, and whose father is a major backer of her architect husband's housing development project in Baguio, a beautiful mountain city in the Philippines' northern island of Luzon.

Baguio is a small resort city where everyone knows everyone, and secrets are hard to hide. Jill is incensed when she learns that all of their mutual friends and colleagues are aware of David's indiscretions and are keeping them from her. Jill sees photos of David and Lexy as a couple socializing with their friends. Her anger reaches a tipping point when she discovers that Lexy is pregnant.

A chain of events follows resulting in catastrophic effects in the lives of the couple, their son Gio (Zaijian Jaranilla), and everyone else involved.

== Cast and characters ==
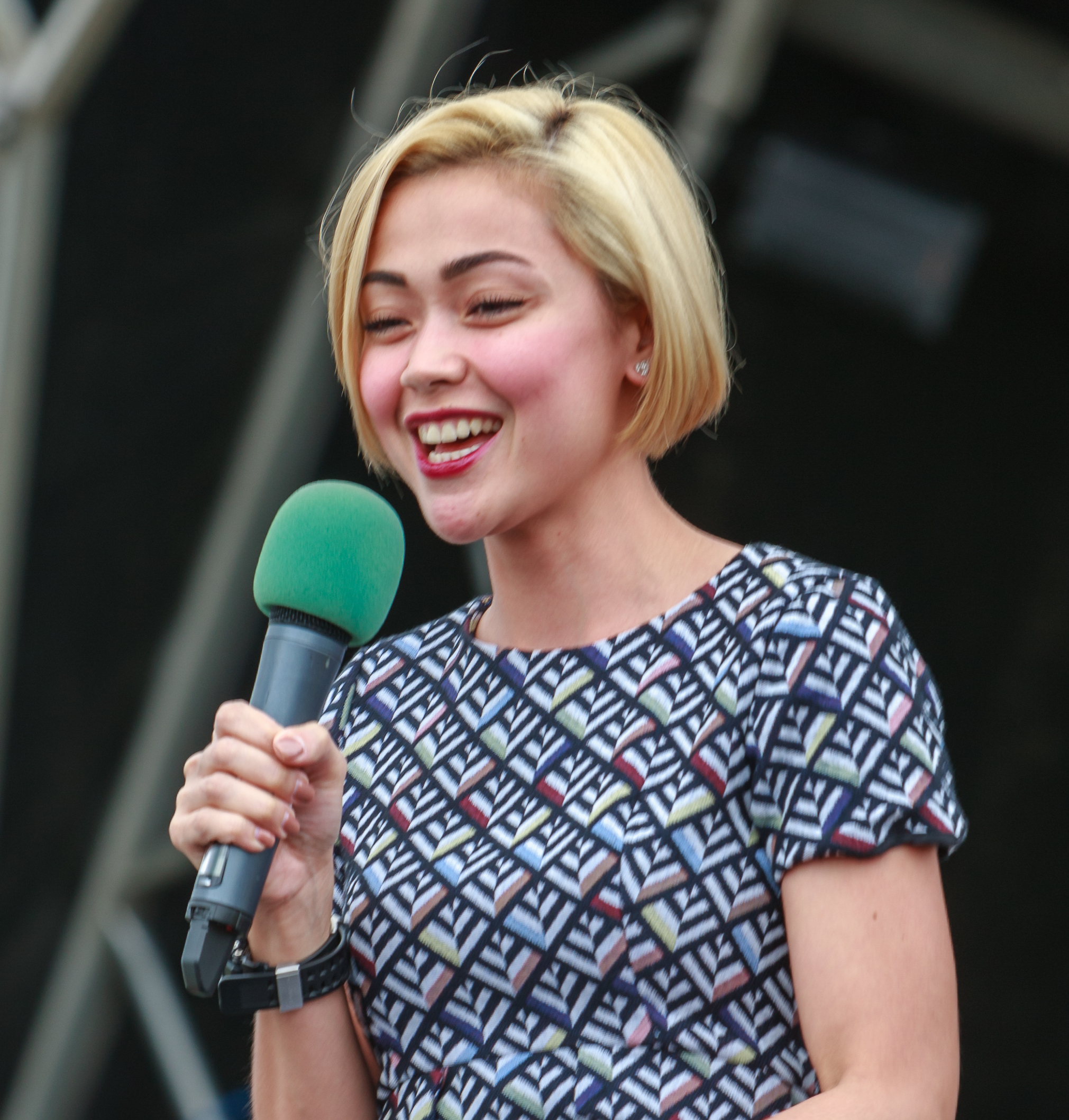
Jodi Sta. Maria

=== Main ===
- Jodi Sta. Maria as Dra. Jill Victorino, M.D. – She is one of Baguio’s renowned and respected internal medicine doctors at Pine Hill Medical Hospital, and a professor at the hospital’s medical school. David’s first wife and Gio’s mother.
- Zanjoe Marudo as David Ilustre – Founder of David Ilustre Architecture and Designs, and head of Illustre Contractors. Jill’s philandering husband, Gio’s father, and Lexy’s paramour of 2 years.
- Sue Ramirez as Alexis "Lexy / Lex" Lucero – Fred and Nathalia's daughter and David's mistress of 2 years. Originally planned to finish her business degree despite her wealthy background. Later on, Lexy marries David and has a daughter with him named Kylie.
- Zaijian Jaranilla as Gio V. Ilustre – David and Jill's son. A top student at Salidummay Academy, his parents’ issues eventually affect his well-being. Gio’s motivation in academics, extracurricular activities, and his friendships deteriorate as his mind is plagued with his family’s problems.

=== Supporting ===
- Jane Oineza as Diane Riagon – A medical student at Pine Hill University Hospital who helps Jill confirm David's infidelity.
- Joem Bascon as Lorenzo "Enzo" Tierra – Diane's errant boyfriend who holds a grudge against Jill. Works at the arcade where Gio and his friends frequent.
- Rachel Alejandro as Nathalia Lucero – Jill's patient and friend, Fred's wife, and Lexy's mother. At first against her daughter’s relationship with a married man, she and her husband become blind-sided later on and accept David.
- Angeli Bayani as Dr. Sandra "Sandy" M. Alipio, M.D. – Jill's medical school colleague and David's former friend. Specializes in OB-GYN at Pine Hill Medical Hospital.
- Ketchup Eusebio as Charlie Manansala – David's neighbor, accountant, business partner, and university colleague, and Carol’s womanizing husband.
- Bianca Manalo as Carol Manansala – Charlie's wife who becomes suspicious of her husband's unfaithful demeanor, and Jill's neighbor and friend.
- Jef Gaitan as Bani De Vera – A provincial resident-turned-nurse who supports Jill in her medical missions.
- Empress Schuck as Grace Jimenez – David's secretary and Mikah's mother.
- Sandino Martin as Dr. Barry V. Inocencio, M.D. – Jill and Sandy's co-worker at Pine Hill Medical Hospital. Like Jill, he also specializes in internal medicine.
- Art Acuña as Alfred "Fred" Lucero – Owner of Lucero Builders, a large property developer, and Lucero Land. Nathalia's husband and Lexy's father.
- Malou Crisologo as Margarita "Maggie" Dimanansala – The nanny of the Lucero household.
- Franco Laurel as Atty. Dante Pugong - Jill's patient and annulment lawyer.
- Lao Rodriguez as Ben Manaloto - Jill’s patient who provides her with a new office space.
- Hannah Ledesma as Dr. Claire Fuentebella, M.D. - The HR manager at Pine Hill Medical Hospital, and David's friend. Specializes in psychiatry.
- Brent Manalo as Miguel "Migs" Illustre – David's younger brother who works at his brother’s company.
- Migs Almendras as Justin Cruz – Lexy's friend.
- Avery Clyde Balasbas as Mikah Jimenez – Grace's daughter and Gio's friend. A student at Salidummay Academy.
- JB Agustin as Maximo "Max" Asuncion – Gio and Mikah’s friend. A student at Salidummay Academy.
- Jie-Ann Armero as Janice Ilustre - David and Migs’ cousin.

=== Special participation ===
- Ronnie Lazaro as Dr. Jose Alindayo, M.D. – Jill's mentor and father figure.
- Susan Africa-Manikan as Marina Ilustre† – David and Migs’ mother.
- Jake Ejercito as Gabriel "Gabby" Gomez – A science teacher and basketball coach at Salidummay Academy.

== Episodes ==
| Season | Episodes | Originally released | |
| Season | Episodes | First released | Last released |
|---|---|---|---|
| 1 | 58 | January 24, 2022 | April 13, 2022 |
| 2 | 49 | April 18, 2022 | June 24, 2022 |

=== Season 1 ===
| No. overall | No. in season | Title | TV title | Original release date (Note: iWantTFC and Viu shows two episodes first in advance before its television broadcast.) | AGB Nielsen Ratings (NUTAM People) |
|---|---|---|---|---|---|
| 1 | 1 | "Awakening of a Dream" | "Global Premiere" | January 24, 2022 | 6.5% |
Dr. Jill Ilustre's confidence in her perfect and solid family is shaken when she discovers lip gloss in her husband’s coat pocket and a strand of blonde hair on his woolen scarf. Recalling her father's cheating, Jill is unsettled, wondering if her husband is having an affair.
| 2 | 2 | "Cracks on the Wall" | "Stalk Mode On" | January 25, 2022 | 7.0% |
Jill's suspicions increase when she catches David lying about being alone in Cebu. David explains his companion and counters her suspicions with affection. He swears she is the only woman in his life.
| 3 | 3 | "Doubts Among Them" | "Suspicious Wife" | January 26, 2022 | 7.3% |
Jill is unable to get the inconsistencies in David's stories out of her head. She confides her suspicions to her close friend and neighbor Carol and her colleague Doctor Sandy, and both assure her that she is being paranoid.
| 4 | 4 | "Suspicions Escalate" | "Meet the Luceros" | January 27, 2022 | 7.4% |
Despite her friends' admonitions about her paranoia, Jill's suspicions increase when she notices more inconsistencies with David's activities. Jill enlists the help of her student, Diane, who tails David to his tryst with a young girl, where the pair are embracing and kissing in front of a townhouse in one of the winding roads of private residences in the mountain city.
| 5 | 5 | "Hunt for the Other Woman" | "Cheater Alert" | January 28, 2022 | 6.3% |
Upon confirming David's amoral visits with an unknown female, Jill instructs Diane to uncover his mistress' identity. Her discovery that David’s mistress is Alexy Lucero, daughter of a friend and patient, shakes her world. For her son's sake, she delays confronting David and pushes through with her plans for David's surprise party.
| 6 | 6 | "The Heartbreaking Truth" | "The Betrayal" | January 31, 2022 | 7.1% |
Jill unleashes her wrath on Diane's boyfriend, Enzo, upon learning of his physical abuse of Diane. In gratitude, Diane tips Jill on a blue pouch stowed in the trunk of David's car. Jill uncovers photographs confirming the truth about David's infidelity and her friends' complicity and betrayal. She is livid that they were gaslighting her all along.
| 7 | 7 | "Inhibitions at Bay" | "Promise" | February 1, 2022 | 8.0% |
Jill pretends a cool facade during the party. Unable to stomach the two lovers' open flirtation, Jill leaves the party early, but she catches David hurriedly join Lexy after he thought she had gone.
| 8 | 8 | "Musky Waters" | "Gigil Si Jill" | February 2, 2022 | 8.6% |
Jill confronts Doc Sandy for keeping her in the dark about David's affair and forbids her friend from ruining her course of action. Thinking about Gio's welfare, Doc Jill decides to think carefully of her course of action.
| 9 | 9 | "The Face Off" | "Doubtful" | February 3, 2022 | 7.9% |
While David and Lexy continue to "accidentally" run across each other at several events, Jill agonizes over what to do. The young mistress, meanwhile, begins to suffer from unbearable stomach pain and is rushed to Jill's clinic.
| 10 | 10 | "Between a Rock and a Hard Place" | "Preggy Lexy" | February 4, 2022 | 7.5% |
At the clinic, Jill learns that Lexy is pregnant. Lexy is shaken up, unsure whether David will accept her pregnancy and leave his wife for her. Without telling him about her pregnancy, she asks him to run away with her to America or Europe but David says he is not ready yet. Earlier that day, Lexy's father awards him the project development contract to build his multi housing project. His office is getting the big break, and he is excited that his career and luck will soon take off.
| 11 | 11 | "The Choices We Make" | "Conscience" | February 7, 2022 | 7.9% |
Lexy decides to leave for America to get an abortion as she does not want to risk losing David and incur her father's wrath. She requests her medical papers from Jill's clinic and confides to Doc Sandy of her plans for an abortion. Jill finds herself conflicted between her medical oath to preserve life and anger at her rival's pregnancy. Meanwhile, Charlie comes home with a lipstick stain on his shirt. It appears to Carol that David's success and indiscretions is contagious, infecting Charlie as well.
| 12 | 12 | "The Fear of Losing Someone" | "Fix It" | February 8, 2022 | 7.6% |
David finally signs his contract agreement with Fred, only to learn that Lexy is leaving. Not ready to give up his mistress, he promises to make her his priority, and asks her to wait until his project is well underway and financially settled before he separates from Jill. Lexy still does not tell him of her pregnancy. Meanwhile, Jill panics when her friend and mentor Doc Jose attempts suicide.
| 13 | 13 | "Brewing Resentment" | "Resentful" | February 9, 2022 | 7.6% |
When his wife asks him about his infidelity, David continues to lie, which infuriates Jill more. Meanwhile Lexy clings to David's promises and decides to keep their baby.
| 14 | 14 | "Truth Between the Lies" | "Enough is Enough" | February 10, 2022 | 7.7% |
Jill’s mother in law divulges that her son's affair with Alexy has been going on for the past 2 years. David promises Lexy he would bear the responsibility for their child. He also asks Lexy to give him time to prepare for his separation from Jill. Meanwhile, Jill continues to keep silent about her discoveries, and works with a lawyer to file for annulment.
| 15 | 15 | "Chess Piece in Place" | "Undercover" | February 11, 2022 | 7.2% |
Following Jill's lead, Diane befriends Lexy to spy on her and David as Jill prepares for the annulment. Doc Jill reaches her limits upon discovering the extent of her husband's duplicity which includes his funneling off money from their savings.
| 16 | 16 | "The Groundbreaking Move" | "Game Plan" | February 14, 2022 | 7.2% |
David remains uncertain about his plans with Lexy, forcing his mistress to give him an ultimatum. Following her lawyer's advice, Jill sets up a meeting with David's accountant.
| 17 | 17 | "The Step We Take" | "Offer" | February 15, 2022 | 7.5% |
Diane befriends Alexy and learns of her abortion plans. Following Jill's instructions, Sandy alerts David about Jill's suspicions about their finances. At their meeting, Charlie figures out Jill's motive and refuses to cooperate without anything in exchange.
| 18 | 18 | "Stacking Secrets" | "Intenstions" | February 16, 2022 | 7.9% |
Jill gives in to Charlie's advances and uses the situation to her advantage. Lexy pushes through with her plan to leave the country without informing her lover. A city permitting issue threatens to derail David's partnership with Fred.
| 19 | 19 | "Fight or Flight" | "Second Thoughts" | February 17, 2022 | 8.0% |
After obtaining the financial documents for the annulment, Jill has the necessary documents for an annulment. However, memories of her once-happy marriage gives her pause as she second guesses her course of action. David laments losing Lexy and their child.
| 20 | 20 | "Enemies in the Shadows" | "Begin Again" | February 18, 2022 | 7.5% |
David makes an earnest promise to fix his life to a seriously-ill Marina. Jill changes her mind about the annulment and gives her marriage another shot. Meanwhile, malicious reviews about Jill's medical skill surfaces in social media.
| 21 | 21 | "Still Water Runs Deep" | "Accusation" | February 21, 2022 | 6.7% |
Jill pressures Charlie to come clean to his wife when Carol suspects them of having an affair. Diane receives an unexpected visit from Enzo. Upon her return, Lexy vows to continue her life without David.
| 22 | 22 | "Hidden Enemies" | "Threaten" | February 22, 2022 | 6.9% |
With her reputation on the line, Jill persuades Diane to file a case against Enzo. However, the medical student comes face-to-face with her ex-boyfriend while attending the opening of Lexy's new business venture, muddling her decision.
| 23 | 23 | "No Silver Lining" | "Trouble" | February 23, 2022 | 6.4% |
Jill is desperate as David's financial investments fail, risking losing her house and her son's college fund. To make matters worse, Enzo's malicious complaints and social media bashing start to affect her work at the hospital.
| 24 | 24 | "The Consequences We Pay" | "Issues" | February 24, 2022 | 6.5% |
After failing to get Diane's help in quashing Enzo's complaints, Jill takes matters into her own hands. David makes great efforts to reconnect with Lexy. Meanwhile, Jill's issues cause Gio troubles in school.
| 25 | 25 | "Nightmare Returning" | "Instinct" | February 25, 2022 | 6.3% |
David and Lexy fail to show up at their respective family dinners as they try to resolve their issues, arousing Jill's suspicions. Helping Jill dig for the truth, Diane approaches Lexy once again.
| 26 | 26 | "Unexpected Turns" | "Chase" | February 28, 2022 | 6.7% |
David wastes no time getting closer to Lexy as she assumes a position at Lucero Builders. Diane stands her ground when Enzo threatens to expose her secret, pushing the latter to launch a new attack against Jill.
| 27 | 27 | "Wild Goose Chase" | "Fooled" | March 1, 2022 | 7.8% |
Jill's world unravels with her suspension from her clinic. Suspicious that Lexy and David have resumed their relationship, Jill confronts Grace and learns about her husband's intricate web of lies.
| 28 | 28 | "The Breaking Point" | "Breaking Point" | March 2, 2022 | 7.6% |
Upon witnessing David and Lexy together, Jill is completely devastated and decides to take some time off from her family. While Gio grows worried about the situation, Lexy chooses to keep David in the dark.
| 29 | 29 | "A Moment of Escape" | "Pain" | March 3, 2022 | 8.0% |
Finding refuge in her childhood sanctuary at Doc Jose's beach house in La Union, Jill struggles to reach a decision regarding David's affair. Meanwhile, David grows anxious upon learning of Jill's sudden disappearance.
| 30 | 30 | "Enough is Enough" | "Turning Point" | March 4, 2022 | 8.8% |
Jill reaches a tipping point when her problems at work and David's betrayal destroys her self esteem. After a failed attempt to end her life, she recovers, fiercely determined to avenge her humiliation and destroy everyone who betrayed her.
| 31 | 31 | "Out in the Open" | "Pasabog Reveal" | March 7, 2022 | 8.7% |
David gets the shock of his life as he and Jill end up at the Lucero mansion for an unannounced visit. At dinner, all hell breaks loose when Jill exposes her husband and his mistress's dirty little secret.
| 32 | 32 | "Beginning of the Aftermath" | "Aftermath" | March 8, 2022 | 9.0% |
Jill makes Lexy admit that she didn't abort her baby. This prompts David to go with Lexy. Enraged, Fred disowns her as she refuses to end her affair. He cancels David's project. Meanwhile, Jill confronts Carol.
| 33 | 33 | "The Next Step" | "Separation" | March 9, 2022 | 8.2% |
Gio confronts his father and sees David living in Lexy's apartment. Despite his father's denial about their relationship, Gio is heartbroken. Jill proceeds with the annulment. David realizes his project with Lucero is at risk as Fred Lucero begins to distance his company from David.
| 34 | 34 | "Audacities and Repercussions" | "Consequence" | March 10, 2022 | 8.4% |
David and Lexy suffer the heavy consequences of their illicit relationship as they lose everything. Marina blames Jill for David's affair. Gio struggles to accept his parents' impending annulment.
| 35 | 35 | "Head on Collision" | "Rage" | March 11, 2022 | 7.9% |
Lexy laments losing her comfortable life, and Nathalia tries to dissuade Fred from turning his back on their only daughter. While David refuses to concede with the annulment of their marriage, Jill is bent on cutting off all ties with David, humiliating him each time he tries to speak with her.
| 36 | 36 | "Crossing Boundaries" | "Double Cross" | March 14, 2022 | 7.8% |
Gio gets caught in the crossfire as David asserts his rights to co-parenting his son. Jill's psychiatric evaluation is delayed when she discovers the psychiatrist is a friend of David, posing a conflict of interest that could compromise her legal battle.
| 37 | 37 | "Pointing Fingers" | "Blame" | March 15, 2022 | 8.5% |
David refuses to cooperate with the annulment process but Jill remains determined to proceed. Lexy approaches her rival with a proposal but it leads to an unexpected incident.
| 38 | 38 | "You Lose Some, You Win Some" | "Rejection" | March 16, 2022 | 7.6% |
Fred Lucero sets his foot down and denies David Illustre entry into his family. Devastated, Lexy turns her back on her parents to be with the father of her child. But David doesn't seem too keen himself about ending his marriage with Jill. He drags his feet in compliance. He fails to attend the first hearing, instead lays out his terms for the annulment. Meanwhile, an old patient comes to Jill's rescue when the doctor struggles to find a new workplace.
| 39 | 39 | "Pushing the Limit" | "Stubborn" | March 17, 2022 | 7.5% |
Jill starts to get her career back on track as her new clinic receives support from her old patients. David continues to claw his way back into Jill and Gio's life, inflaming Lexy's jealousy.
| 40 | 40 | "Away from You, Us, and Everything in Between" | "Next Move" | March 18, 2022 | N/A |
While David gives in to his every request, Gio begins to feel suffocated by Jill's strict parenting. After getting wind of the Ilustres' financial struggle, Nathalia makes an unthinkable offer to Jill.
| 41 | 41 | "The Last Straw" | "Last Straw" | March 21, 2022 | 7.6% |
David learns about Jill's suicide attempt at La Union and uses this information to file for sole custody of Gio. Enraged, Jill pulls Gio out of school and her irrational act is witnessed by many. Gio breaks down and blames his family's marital troubles to his mother.
| 42 | 42 | "Desperate Moves" | "Desperation" | March 22, 2022 | 8.4% |
David continues to overrule Jill's decisions on Gio's welfare causing a great deal of conflict between the couple. But he overplays his hand when Jill is forced to reveal the ugly truth of David's deception which extends to their financial health, his college trust fund and home. Lexy discovers Diane's connection to Jill.
| 43 | 43 | "Vehemence" | "Attack" | March 23, 2022 | 8.0% |
David and Jill's custody battle over their son takes a turn for the worse when David loses it and beats her up to unconsciousness. His violent acts are witnessed by Gio, Lexy and Carol. Jill is rushed to the hospital while David is incarcerated.
| 44 | 44 | "The End of a Dream" | "Shattered Dreams" | March 24, 2022 | 7.9% |
Jill pursues her annulment and charges David with frustrated homicide. Fred and Natalia refuse to help David, so Lexy sells all her assets for David's bail. Jill agrees to drop her charges on the condition that she gets everything and full custody of Gio. Knowing he has no chance, David agrees. Doctor Jill finds hope for a new beginning after finally getting David out of her life.
| 45 | 45 | "Cruel Aftermath" | "Struggle" | March 25, 2022 | 7.6% |
Jill's Marriage to David is annulled, and her life is back on track. David does not fare as well. The scandal and his violence against Jill ruins his reputation causing him to lose his projects and shut down his business. Although Fred is clear about not accepting David, Nathalie arranges a place for the couple until the gossip dies down.
| 46 | 46 | "The End of Everything" | "Reclaim" | March 28, 2022 | 7.5% |
Jill returns to Pine Hill University Hospital. Fred goes to great lengths to protect Lexy from any legal scandal, arranging to send the couple abroad for a fresh start. Gio continues to reject David's effort to reach out.
| 47 | 47 | "Surprise of the Year" | "New Chapter" | March 29, 2022 | 7.6% |
Two years pass as Jill and Gio regain the peace and stability they need. Jill and Gio mourn with the Ilustres on Marina's demise. Their peaceful life together is cut short with the news of David and Lexy returning to Baguio for good. Billboards on David's Green Homes Project comes up.
| 48 | 48 | "Back to Black" | "Move On" | March 30, 2022 | 7.3% |
Turns out, David is not only back for good, but very successful and fully accepted into the family by Fred and Nathalie Lucero. Catching Jill at his new house, David insinuates that his ex-wife has not moved on yet from their past. Wanting to disprove David's innocuous remark, the doctor dons a new look and agrees to Sandy's invitation for a blind date.
| 49 | 49 | "Invitation to Fall" | "Hesitation" | March 31, 2022 | 8.0% |
As Sandy sets her up with a date, Jill grows hesitant to get into a new relationship. Gio and Jill's friends receive invitation to David and Lexy's housewarming celebration but refuse to go.
| 50 | 50 | "Welcome Party" | "Party Crasher" | April 1, 2022 | 7.8% |
With David's insistence, Gio attends the housewarming party of the Ilustres. Much to everyone's surprise, Jill crashes the happy occasion with Gabby in tow after receiving a photo of Gio drinking.
| 51 | 51 | "The Same Leopard Spots" | "Resemblance" | April 4, 2022 | 8.0% |
Gio is mortified that his mother gatecrashed his father's housewarming reception bringing a date, and later drowns his sorrows in alcohol as he witnesses his parents moving on from one another. Gio is soon very drunk and unable to walk unassisted. While Jill searches for Gio, she stumbles into the newlywed's bedroom, noticing the resemblances in their taste in the room decor, design elements, Alexa's clothes, and even her perfume. When David catches her in the room, Jill cleverly feigns seduction, and David, the serial philander, admits he's still thinking of her. She bursts his ego and leaves abruptly. She also piques Alexy's suspicions as they bump into each other when Jill steps out of their bedroom with David following behind her.
| 52 | 52 | "Unsettling Feelings" | "Unsettled" | April 5, 2022 | 7.8% |
Jill resolves to draw the line in her growing friendship with Gabby after learning he is Gio's teacher. Meanwhile, Alexy Illustre's home and lifestyle mimics Jill and David's previous lives. David whispers the same "until my death" lines that he used to with Jill. Jill is melancholic and struggling to break free from the past. She receives a floral bouquet from an unknown person, with a note that simply calls her a Bitch.
| 53 | 53 | "Forbidden Fruit" | "Denial" | April 6, 2022 | 7.4% |
Upon realizing that David sent her the flowers to get her riled up, an enraged Jill confronts him about it but ends up in a heated clash with Lexy. Gio gets into trouble when Grace catches him and Mikah alone together in a room.
| 54 | 54 | "Forming Two Sides" | "Argument" | April 7, 2022 | 7.5% |
Jill's issues with David begin to affect her relationship with Gio. As David grows hell-bent on weeding her out of their son's life, Jill reaches out to the Manansalas for help with stopping his plans.
| 55 | 55 | "The Root Cause" | "Torment" | April 8, 2022 | 7.5% |
While her relationship with Gio deteriorates because of David's manipulation of events, Jill faces another problem at work. Putting the pieces together, the doctor soon realizes that Dra. Fuentabella is David's foot soldier and root cause of all grievances raised against her professional ethics.
| 56 | 56 | "Rumors and Lies" | "Rumors" | April 11, 2022 | 7.4% |
At the Country Club with Carol, Jill quickly debunks the rumors about her leaving Baguio when she overhears Nathalia and Lexy gossiping about selling her home. Meanwhile, David has a secret meeting with Dra. Fuentabella who reports on Jill's whereabouts and other information that he twists to turn Gio against his mother. David is bent on running Jill out of their little resort town.
| 57 | 57 | "The Lines Not to Be Crossed" | "Inescapable" | April 12, 2022 | 7.0% |
Jill assures Gio that a romantic relationship with Gabby is not happening. Soon, tension heats up between Jill and Lexy when the latter attempts to win Gio over. Lexy's kindness to the young boy as compared to Jill's discipline confuses Gio, who is unaware of his father's manipulation and true intentions.
| 58 | 58 | "Tipping Point" | "Affected" | April 13, 2022 | 7.0% |
Misunderstanding arises between Jill and Gio when he finds his mother's shawl in Gabby's possession. Malicious rumors about Jill and Gabby soon spread across the town, casting doubts that he earned his Team Captain position fairly and on his own merit. In one such incident, Gio's broken family situation and his mother is mocked by some team members, prompting him to defend his mother and gets into a brawl.

=== Season 2 ===
| No. overall | No. in season | Title | TV title | Original release date | AGB Nielsen Ratings (NUTAM People) |
|---|---|---|---|---|---|
| 59 | 1 | "Changing Sides" | "Choice" | April 18, 2022 | 7.3% |
Gio is mercilessly bullied by his teammates because of Jill's friendship with Gabby. He quickly descends into depression and rash behaviors. Jill's world crumbles when Gio chooses to live with his father where he feels his father could protect him from the bullying.
| 60 | 2 | "A Mother’s Anguish" | "Fury" | April 19, 2022 | 7.5% |
David does everything to turn Gio against his mother who tries everything to get through to Gio. Soon, the livid mother's desperate attempt to take her son back worsens her situation when a video of her circulates online.
| 61 | 3 | "You Reap What Others Have Sown" | "Backfire" | April 20, 2022 | 8.0% |
Jill's scandalous video costs her not only her relationship with Gio but also her position in the hospital. Carol entrusts Charlie with a task to help Jill, only for her husband to fall right back into his old womanizing habit upon catching up with David.
| 62 | 4 | "A World Without Me" | "Despair" | April 21, 2022 | 8.0% |
Gio continues to avoid his mother as her video begins to circulate among his schoolmates. Despite this, Jill makes a desperate move to check on him. However, what Jill witnesses breaks her heart even more and sends her into an abyss of despair.
| 63 | 5 | "A Sliver of Hope" | "Alarmed" | April 22, 2022 | 7.2% |
Gabby gets tangled in Jill's issues as his friendship with her puts him in a bad light at work. Jill finds a sliver of hope when she finds Gio back at home for a bit. That quickly changes when she spots a masked man in her house.
| 64 | 6 | "One Misstep After Another" | "Devastated" | April 25, 2022 | 7.4% |
Gio lashes out at Jill for throwing malicious accusations at David. Devastated and drunk, Jill ends up in a bar and in the company of Gabby.
| 65 | 7 | "Tides are Turning Against" | "Upset" | April 26, 2022 | 7.5% |
Jill is distraught as David continues to gaslight her, his lies about her continue to drive a wedge between her and Gio. Meanwhile, Carol senses something amiss with Charlie's behavior.
| 66 | 8 | "Lost and Found" | "Manipulate" | April 27, 2022 | 6.9% |
Jill gets booted out of her office as Claire, David's ally, takes over her position at the hospital. Troubled and uncared for, Gio skips his classes. The Ilustres host a dinner to patch things up with their friends.
| 67 | 9 | "Heated Encounters" | "Fight" | April 28, 2022 | 6.8% |
David turns Charlie's world upside down to even the score with him. Carol catches him with another woman in a situation David set up. Carol makes her stand for Jill and urges her to fight back. Gio gets outnumbered in a brawl and receives help from Enzo, who is planning something to get back at Jill.
| 68 | 10 | "Unwanted Presence" | "Unwanted" | April 29, 2022 | 6.7% |
Despite Gio's rejections of Jill's efforts to win her son back, Jill remains constant in her love and attention towards Gio. Meanwhile, Gio feels alienated in his new environment. He is uncomfortable around his father's new family and witnesses how happy David is with them.
| 69 | 11 | "Mother's Instinct" | "Mother's Hunch" | May 2, 2022 | 6.3% |
Learning about her son's intention to leave the basketball team, Jill suspects that Gio is being mistreated in David's household. The worried mother receives a call from Gio's school about his behavioral issues and falling marks.
| 70 | 12 | "Child’s Pride" | "Rebel Child" | May 3, 2022 | 6.9% |
Finding out that Gio is neglecting his studies, David and Jill try to get to the bottom of their son's problems. When Mikah reveals Gio's conflict with Fred and Nathalia, Jill rushes to the Luceros to confront them. This backfires on Jill because Gio wants to avoid conflict with his dad's new family.
| 71 | 13 | "Taking Blame" | "Reprehend" | May 4, 2022 | 6.3% |
Jill reaches her boiling point when Gio throws painful accusations against her—including trying to ruin David's new family. As Mikah continues to get dragged into her friend's messy family drama, Grace decides to separate the friends. She bans Mikah from seeing Gio.
| 72 | 14 | "Unknown Danger Zone" | "Truce" | May 5, 2022 | 6.7% |
Despite their parents orders to avoid their friend, Max and Mikah worry for Gio when he introduces them to his new friend, Enzo. With Claire's help, David successfully prevents Jill from ruining his plans for Gio's birthday. Beaten and worried over Gio's continued downward spiral, Jill calls for a truce as the boy falls into deeper trouble at school.
| 73 | 15 | "Falling Apart" | "Troublemaker" | May 6, 2022 | 6.2% |
Jill celebrates Gio's birthday without him, and Gio bursts into tears when he sees his mother's gift for him, saddened and frustrated over his family situation. Jill discovers the reason behind the drastic change in her son's behavior. He gets suspended and grounded. Lexy also reprimands Gio.
| 74 | 16 | "Protect the Truth" | "Viral" | May 10, 2022 (Note: This episode was originally gonna release on May 9, 2022, but was later moved the next day because of the 2022 Philippine Presidential election.) | 6.9% |
Enzo blackmails Jill for a large sum of money after sending her a video of Gio attempting to force himself upon Mikah. Wanting to protect her son, the doctor agrees to meet Enzo's demand, placing her house as collateral for a loan.
| 75 | 17 | "Taking Control" | "Damage Control" | May 11, 2022 | 7.3% |
Jill alerts law enforcement and successfully traps Enzo, effectively puts him behind bars. She destroys Gio's video and assures him it will never get exposed. Jill decides she will not give in to David's plans to run her out of Baguio.
| 76 | 18 | "After the Scandal" | "Repercussion" | May 12, 2022 | 8.1% |
Jill tries her best to protect Gio from the repercussions of his assault on Max. The school board calls for disciplinary action against Gio. While the conflict with Max's family is settled through Fred's connections, Grace agrees not to file a case against Gio on the condition that he transfer to another school. The assault on Max could result to his expulsion.
| 77 | 19 | "Teen’s Rage" | "Outrage" | May 13, 2022 | 6.5% |
While a worried Jill tries to talk to Gio through her ex-husband, the Luceros' discomfort with Gio's rebellious and violent behavior pushes David to make a decision to move Gio to a boarding school in America. David pays Jill a surprise visit.
| 78 | 20 | "Runaway" | "Runaway" | May 16, 2022 | 5.8% |
Upon learning of his father's plan to send him abroad, Gio leaves home and runs to Mika to apologize again for his behavior. Jill comes across her distraught son on the road and takes him home.
| 79 | 21 | "A Different Approach" | "Reunited" | May 17, 2022 | 6.0% |
David assumes that Gio is at Jill's, rushes to her place, and demands Gio return to him. As tension escalates, Jill calls for a truce and invites David to join them for dinner hoping to settle their issues as a family. Things get steamy between Jill and David as they reminisce on their good times together. They end up in bed together.
| 80 | 22 | "Burning Passion" | "Sinful Night" | May 18, 2022 | 5.6% |
Jill regrets her passionate night with David, especially when Carol tells her she saw and heard them the night before. She warns Jill that Gio must hand heard them too, advising her that this could further hurt their son. David, on the other hand, can't take his mind off Jill, convinced that Jill still wants him back.
| 81 | 23 | "The Marriage Vow" | "Vows" | May 19, 2022 | 5.7% |
David is certain Jill still loves him and thinks he can keep her on the side but Jill clarifies that nothing will ever happen between them again. During a dinner with Claire, Jill is shown a video clip from David and Lexy's wedding, and recognizes the identical words and song played at their own wedding. She comes to the conclusion that David’s life with Lexy mimics her life with David.
| 82 | 24 | "Unravelling of Lies" | "Revelation" | May 20, 2022 | 5.6% |
Jill learns of Gio's troubles from Claire. Discovering that David had forged her consent to release Gio's school records to the boarding school, the livid doctor confronts her ex about his decision to send their son away without her consent. David faces Gio's fury.
| 83 | 25 | "Exposed" | "Exposed" | May 23, 2022 | 6.1% |
Jill's relentless effort to fix Gio's issue yields a positive result when Grace agrees to wipe the slate clean. Although apprehensive, David accepts the turn of events but Lexy is not on board with it. Later, a new problem arises for Gio when Enzo's video of Gio and Mica goes viral in his school's website.
| 84 | 26 | "The Breakout" | "Scandal" | May 24, 2022 | 6.2% |
Jill rushes to her son but the young boy remains resentful toward his mother. Jill investigates Enzo's involvement in the incident and catches him speaking with Nathalia in the close circuit TV recording at a local bar and pool house.
| 85 | 27 | "A Mother's Unconditional Love" | "Reconciliation" | May 25, 2022 | 5.4% |
Nathalia explains that Enzo has been blackmailing her. With the help of Nathalia and the police, Jill puts Enzo behind bars for good. Over at David's, Lexy who has seen the video, puts her foot down and bans Gio from staying with them. Gio is devastated when David kicks him out. Jill takes Gio home, vowing to protect her son, and mother and son finally reconcile.
| 86 | 28 | "Sabotage" | "Expulsion" | May 26, 2022 | 5.7% |
Jill is advised by the school principal of Gio's permanent expulsion. She consoles her distraught son and tells him they can both leave Baguio and start fresh elsewhere. David confronts Jill when he discovers her plan to leave Baguio with their son. Later, Jill's real estate broker informs her that her ex-husband has offered to buy her house.
| 87 | 29 | "A Thorn in the Side" | "Priorities" | May 27, 2022 | 5.1% |
Jill texts Lexy to tell her about David's offer and that she would only consider selling to him for an amount not lower than P50 million. Lexy is upset that David would even offer to buy her house, suggesting he appears to be more invested in his former family than hers. As Jill and Gio make every effort to avoid him, David is relentless in pursuing them. His misplaced priorities land him in hot water with Fred who warns him about focusing on his present family.
| 88 | 30 | "Ticking Bomb" | "Gatecrasher" | May 30, 2022 | 5.9% |
David gatecrashes Sandy's wedding to confront Jill, demanding to speak with Gio. Sick and tired of her ex-husband's intimidations, Jill lets Lexy know that David is up to no good.
| 89 | 31 | "Doubt" | "Feeding Doubts" | May 31, 2022 | 5.8% |
Lexy is troubled after Jill hands over the necktie David left when they slept together. Later, Lexy announces her plan to study abroad which leads to a confrontation with David. She brings up her husband's secret meeting with his ex-wife. David denies anything happened, but Lexy is not convinced.
| 90 | 32 | "Hide and Seek" | "Lies Over Lies" | June 1, 2022 | 6.0% |
A doubtful Lexy is determined to know if David is lying to her, not knowing that her husband has his tracks cleanly covered. Jill encourages Gio to meet up with Mikah and Max, unaware that it will lead to David tracking down their whereabouts.
| 91 | 33 | "Believing the Lies" | "Doubting Truths" | June 2, 2022 | 5.4% |
Unnerved by David's preoccupation with Jill and his past, her paranoia heightens when Diane, who also happens to be Justin's university buddy, warns her about David's cheating patterns. Lexy runs into Claire who eagerly shows her Jill's home is up for sale and has left Baguio. Doubts fill her head when Claire confides that this is what David had planned all along.
| 92 | 34 | "Looking with a Blind Eye" | "Eye Opener" | June 3, 2022 | 6.2% |
Lexy visits Jill's house and sees the uncanny similarities in many aspects in both her and Jill's lives. Carol also confirms to her that she saw David and Jill making love in their house last week, the night he left his tie, when he was supposedly with clients. Earlier in the day, Jill confesses their indiscretions to Fred and Natalia Lucero, hoping they would open Lexy's eyes to David's womanizing. Confident that Lexy would confront her, Jill asks the Luceros to be present at the hotel. With her husband's unfaithfulness exposed to her parents, Lexy lies that David confessed his infidelity and the couple agreed to work things out.
| 93 | 35 | "Broken Pieces" | "Crumbling Apart" | June 6, 2022 | 6.1% |
Lexy confronts David who finally comes clean about his one night affair with his ex-wife. Jill struggles to help her son who is mentally and psychologically affected by David and their family mess. Carol has her own share of excitement when she discovers she of pregnant.
| 94 | 36 | "In a Dilemma" | "Broken Trust" | June 7, 2022 | 5.1% |
Despite David's efforts to make it up to Lexy, she struggles to pick up the shattered pieces of her broken trust. Jill, on the other hand, as she sorts through her possessions, remembers the past she and her ex-husband shared. She comes across her wedding album and video, and once again sees the stark similarities with Lexy's wedding and her life with David.
| 95 | 37 | "Irreparable" | "Undeniable Truth" | June 8, 2022 | 5.4% |
Gio apologizes to Jill for all the hurtful things he did and agrees to leave Baguio with his mother. Elsewhere, cracks of doubts begin to form in Lexy's heart as Jill shows her shards of the undeniable truth: David's obsession with Jill, and Lexy is simply a younger version of her.
| 96 | 38 | "Obsession" | "Obsession" | June 9, 2022 | 5.6% |
Jill provides Lexy with indisputable evidence of David's obsession with her. Despite everything they went through, Jill and her friends decide to celebrate their little wins in life. David continues to stalk Jill and a violent confrontation ensues outside the hotel.
| 97 | 39 | "Another Version of Her" | "His Taste" | June 10, 2022 | 5.1% |
Lexy realizes that David is dishonest and a cheat when she views David's and Jill's recorded wedding vows which are comically identical to their own. Rage and heartbreak fills her heart when she finally believes Jill's claims of David's obsession for her and his duplicitous facade.
| 98 | 40 | "Downfall" | "Cheater's Karma" | June 13, 2022 | 6.0% |
Fred Lucero takes over to protect his daughter and grandchild. He kicks David out of their home, closes his business and all access to their funds. Blaming his downfall on Jill, David attempts to get to Gio so he would leave her again. Gio tells his father that he is a liar and warns him to stay away from their lives.
| 99 | 41 | "Closed Doors" | "Unwelcome" | June 14, 2022 | 5.5% |
With all his dirty secrets out in the open, David attempts to get Gio to side with him. He then resorts to yet another desperate move when his vile tactic of emotional blackmail did not work on Jill. David learns that Lexy and Kylie moved to London permanently.
| 100 | 42 | "Losing Control" | "Moving Forward" | June 15, 2022 | 5.9% |
Fred Lucero boots David out of his mother's house with a demand to pay back all the funds given to David from his marriage with Lexy. The prenuptial agreement waived all his rights to a conjugal share. Left with no choice but to sleep in his office's storage space, David breaks into tears as he recalls how he lost everything he holds dear. Gabby pays Jill a visit, unaware of the pair of lurking eyes observing their every move.
| 101 | 43 | "Deserving Irony" | "Downfall" | June 16, 2022 | 6.0% |
While David sinks into misery, Jill and Gio try to make a fresh start with their friends. However, the dejected father disrupts their peace once again as he desperately attempts to reconcile with them.
| 102 | 44 | "Desperation" | "Misery" | June 17, 2022 | 5.6% |
Jill and Gio struggle to break free from David who remains determined to destroy Jill and win Gio. Gabby tells Jill that he will wait for her for as long as it takes.
| 103 | 45 | "Hanging on the Edge" | "Farewells" | June 20, 2022 | 5.7 % |
Mikah says her farewells to Gio. She and her mother are moving to Manila where her mom landed a job. Later, Jill searches for Gio once again after he mysteriously disappears. She finds out that her son is with an unstable David, and reaches her distraught son who witnesses his father's attempt to jump off the cliff.
| 104 | 46 | "Other Ways" | "Alternatives" | June 21, 2022 | 5.9% |
After successfully stopping David from jumping off the cliff, the family are having lunch at the hotel bistro. The anxious mother and son witness David eating ravenously as if a near-catastrophic disaster never happened. David wastes no time to bring back Jill's post partum depression, infuriating Jill over David's disregard of their son's feelings. She finally finds out what drove Gio away from her. David promises Gio that he will no longer bother them and gives him a fatherly advice to live his life well. Gio heaves a sigh of relief now that David is out of harm's way, unaware that his parents have struck a deal behind his back.
| 105 | 47 | "Cold and Painless" | "Bitter End" | June 22, 2022 | 5.5% |
Recalling his last conversation with Jill, David steels himself as he musters the courage to end his suffering. Gio calls to check up on his father, unaware of what the troubled man is about to do. Jill overhears her son speaking to his father and drives back to David and finds him unconscious on the floor.
| 106 | 48 | "The Collateral Damage" | "Permanent Damage" | June 23, 2022 | 5.5% |
Jill sits beside the sleeping body of David and waits for him to wake up. When he does, she tells him she only gave him a combination of an antihistamine to make him sleep and a saline solution, not a lethal dose because she is a doctor who made an oath to save lives not end them. She asks David to change his ways and do something good for the sake of his children. She gives him the family photo that she handed to him on all his business travel. David promises he will stop harassing them. However, her heart sinks upon returning home and finds Gio gone, his cell phone left behind.
| 107 | 49 | "The End of the Beginning" | "The Heart Shattering Finale" | June 24, 2022 | 5.8% |
Jill is heartbroken when she views Gio's heart-shattering video message. The chaos and anger surrounding their family becomes a heavy burden for Gio, and he decides he needs to distance himself for a couple of years. Jill reports her missing son and David comes to console her. Several years later, we find the Luceros back in Baguio, and Kylie is about 8 years old, the family is healed from the devastation of David's betrayal, and are ready to move on. David is job hunting, fully aware his competition are much younger candidates. Though the viewer does not know what happens to him, it is implied that he is ready to make a career change, ready to move on too. Jill is back at her post at the medical clinic, as she continues to wait for her son to come home, clinging to memories of happier times. She realizes the damage David's betrayal was not the only cause for her family's breakdown. Her anger towards David, their competition to win at all costs, and their disregard for their son, torn apart by their anger towards one another, all these damaged Gio irreparably. Jill prays for his healing and never gives up. At the end, Gio returns, a matured adult, as mother and son reunite.

== Production ==
=== Background and development ===
The Broken Marriage Vow is a Filipino remake of Doctor Foster, created and written by Mike Bartlett and produced by BBC One. The Philippines is the sixth country in the world to adapt the hit drama from the United Kingdom.

The project was first announced on April 13, 2021, after ABS-CBN signed an agreement with BBC Studios to do the Philippine adaptation. The series will be directed by Connie Macatuno, who previously served as the director of Precious Hearts Romances Presents: Paraiso.

Table-read session for the cast was held on June 22, 2021.

=== Casting ===
The first four cast members were revealed on May 7, 2021. Jodi Sta. Maria will play as the lead character Dr. Jill Ilustre, with Zanjoe Marudo as the husband David Illustre, and Sue Ramirez as the mistress Lexy Lucero. Zaijian Jaranilla will portray as the son Gio Illustre. Sta. Maria and Marudo are previously starred together in Maria Leonora Teresa (2014).

On June 14, 2021, the rest of the cast were announced, which includes Jane Oineza and Empress Schuck. On December 1, Jake Ejercito has been cast in the series with an undisclosed role. On his social media account, Ejercito announced on December 10, 2021, that he will portray the role of Gabby on the series.

=== Filming ===
Filming started in July 2021 in Baguio with a lock-in taping set-up and ended on December 22, 2021.

=== Timeslot change ===
On May 16, 2022, after Viral Scandal ended, The Broken Marriage Vow was moved to a later timeslot at 9:30 PM to give way for 2 Good 2 Be True.

== Marketing ==
The first half-minute teaser was released on December 1, 2021, showing the first glimpse of the main characters. Philippine media Rappler said that the teaser has trending scenes that are reminiscent to the South Korean series The World of the Married (made its premiere since June 15, 2020). 5 teasers in total are released showing a few scenes from the series before the release of the full trailer. The official trailer has been released on December 15, 2021, together with a live reaction from the main cast. On January 6, 2022, a new teaser was released showing new clips and introducing cast members. A midseason trailer was released on February 24, 2022.

The official poster was released on January 3, 2022, and was designed by Justin Besana. On March 1, 2022, a midseason poster was released and also designed by Besana.

== Reception ==
Upon its premiere, The Broken Marriage Vow already captivated the eyes of the viewers, becoming the most viewed Asian drama on Viu in the Philippines consistently.

=== Awards and nominations ===
| Year | Award | Category | Nominee(s) | Result | Ref. |
|---|---|---|---|---|---|
| 2022 | ContentAsia Awards | Best TV Format Adaptation (Scripted) in Asia | The Broken Marriage Vow | Won | |
| 2022 | ContentAsia Awards | Best Female Lead in a TV Programme | Jodi Sta. Maria | Nominated | |
| 2022 | Asian Academy Creative Awards | Best Actor in a Supporting Role | Zaijan Jaranilla | Nominated | |
| 2022 | Asian Academy Creative Awards | Best Actress in a Leading Role | Jodi Sta. Maria | Won | |
| 2022 | Asian Academy Creative Awards | Best Adaptation of an Existing Format | The Broken Marriage Vow | Nominated | |
| 2022 | Asian Academy Creative Awards | Best Editing | Rommel Malimban | Nominated | |
| 2022 | Asian Academy Creative Awards | Best Promo or Trailer | The Broken Marriage Vow | Nominated | |
| 2022 | Asian Academy Creative Awards | Best Theme Song or Title Theme | Gusto Ko Nang Bumitaw | Nominated | |

== Soundtrack ==
The Themes of The Broken Marriage Vow

Soundtrack album by Various Artists
- Released: February 18, 2022
- Genre: Soundtrack
- Language: Filipino
- Label: Star Music
- Producer: ABS-CBN Film Productions, Inc.

Singles from The Themes of The Broken Marriage Vow
- 1. "Walang Pagsisisi" Released: February 11, 2022; 2. "Gusto Ko Nang Bumitaw" Released: February 11, 2022; 3. "Init Sa Lamig" Released: February 11, 2022; 4. "Sa Dulo (Main Version)" Released: February 11, 2022; 5. "Sa Dulo (Alternate Version)" Released: February 11, 2022

Released February 18, 2022
| No. | Title | Writer(s) | Artist(s) | Length |
|---|---|---|---|---|
| 1. | "Walang Pagsisisi" | Jonathan Manalo; Rox Santos | Angeline Quinto | 5:20 |
| 2. | "Sa Dulo (Main Version)" | Jonathan Manalo; Trisha Denise Campañer | Gigi De Lana and Gigi Vibes | 3:57 |
| 3. | "Init Sa Lamig" | Daryl Ong | Kyla | 4:48 |
| 4. | "Tinatapos Ko Na" | Sarah Jane Gandia | Jona | 4:15 |
| 5. | "Gusto Ko Nang Bumitaw (Band Version)" | Jonathan Manalo; Michiko Unso; Sheryn Regis | Morissette | 4:31 |
| 6. | "Sa Dulo (Alternate Version)" | Jonathan Manalo; Trisha Denise Campañer | Fana | 3:15 |
| 7. | "Gusto Ko Nang Bumitaw" | Jonathan Manalo; Michiko Unso; Sheryn Regis | Morissette | 4:31 |
| 8. | "Init Sa Lamig (Stripped)" | Daryl Ong | Kyla | 4:48 |
| Total length: | | | | 35:25 |

== Release ==
A special screening of the pilot episode was released on January 17, 2022, on ktx.ph.

On January 15, 2022, it was also announced that ABS-CBN Entertainment made a partnership with Asian entertainment content platform, Viu. The series premiered on Viu 48 hours ahead of the TV premiere.
