= Relaks, It's Just Pag-ibig =

- Film poster
- Directed by: Antoinette Jadaone; Irene Emma Villamor
- Written by: Antoinette Jadaone; Irene Villamor
- Produced by: Piolo Pascual; Joyce Bernal; Erick Raymundo
- Starring: Iñigo Pascual; Julian Estrada; Sofia Andres
- Cinematography: Dan Villegas
- Edited by: Joyce Bernal; Marla Ancheta; Chrisel Galeno-Desuasido
- Production company: Spring Films
- Distributed by: Star Cinema
- Release date: November 12, 2014
- Running time: 100 minutes
- Country: Philippines
- Languages: Filipino; English
- Box office: ₱4.9 million

Relaks, It's Just Pag-ibig (Relax, It's Just Love) is a 2014 Filipino romantic comedy film starring real life father-and-son Piolo Pascual and Iñigo Pascual, Julian Estrada, and Sofia Andres. It was directed by Antoinette Jadaone who was also behind the films Beauty in a Bottle and That Thing Called Tadhana. It was also the debut film of the newbie artists Pascual, Estrada and Andres.

The film was given five perfect stars by the critics from the local film reviewer website ClickTheCity.com, and rated PG by MTRCB. The film was also given Graded A by the Cinema Evaluation Board. It also received positive responses from film watchers and became a trending topic on the social networking site Twitter during its first day of showing.

== Summary ==
The story of Relaks, It's Just Pag-ibig revolves around a 16-year-old girl named Sari (Sofia Andres) who picked up a love letter written by a certain man named Elias, dedicated to a woman named Salome. Sari wanted to meet the two under the blue moon in a beach in Leyte. She dragged Josh (Iñigo Pascual), a non-believer in love, in her journey, and also her best friend Kiko (Julian Estrada), who is secretly in love with Sari.

== Cast ==
=== Main cast ===
- Sofia Andres as Sari Nakpil
- Iñigo Pascual as Josh Brillantes
- Julian Estrada as Kiko Leano

=== Supporting cast ===
- Smokey Manaloto as Manong
- Ericka Villongco as Cupcake
- Alessandra De Rossi as Mace
- Piolo Pascual as Elias
- James Reid as Edward
- Pia Magalona
- Peque Gallaga
- Alexander Diaz
- Earl Ignacio
- Cesca Litton

== Box office ==
The film was considered a moderate success, considering that the three main leads of the film were not relatively known to audiences, especially Iñigo Pascual. The film ultimately earned ₱10,954,361 ($110,562) at the box-office.
