= Julian Estrada =

Filipino actor

- Born: Julian Emilio Vitug Ejercito; January 15, 1996 (age 30); San Juan, Metro Manila, Philippines
- Education: MINT College
- Occupation: Actor
- Years active: 2007–2010; 2013–present
- Agent: Star Magic (2013–2017)
- Height: 1.76 m (5 ft 9 in)
- Family: Ejercito

Julian Emilio "Jul" Vitug Ejercito (Tagalog pronunciation: [ʔɛˌhɛːɾ.sɪˈto]; born January 15, 1996), is a Filipino actor. He was a talent of ABS-CBN and Star Magic and part of the Ejercito-Estrada clan. He was born to Senator Jinggoy Estrada, a politician and former actor who was a member of the Senate of the Philippines, and to Ma. Presentacion "Precy" Vitug.

== Filmography ==
=== Television Shows ===
Year	Title	Role
2010	Maalaala Mo Kaya: Sanggol	Dansel
2013	Wansapanataym	Ian
2013	ASAP	Host / Performer

=== Movies ===
Year	Title	Role
2007	Katas ng Saudi	Biboy
2014	Relaks, It's Just Pag-ibig	Jose Francisco "Kiko" R. Villano
2014	She's Dating the Gangster	Jet
2020	Coming Home	Berns Librada

=== TV Guest Appearances ===
Year	Title	Role
2013	Kris TV	Guest / Himself
2013	The Buzz	Guest / Himself
2013	It's Showtime	Performer / Himself
2013	Gandang Gabi Vice	Guest / Himself
2014	Gandang Gabi Vice	Guest / Himself

== Awards and recognition ==
Year	Award-giving body	Category	Nominated work	Result	Ref.
2012	Star Magic Ball 2012	Prince of the Night award	Himself	Won	
2015	PMPC Star Awards for Movies	New Movie Actor of the Year	Relaks, It's Just Pag-Ibig	Nominated	
2015	PMPC Star Awards for Movies	Male Star of the Night	Himself	Won	
