= List of Magpakailanman episodes (2020–present) =

Magpakailanman ('Forevermore') is a weekly drama anthology broadcast by GMA Network in the Republic of the Philippines. The show is hosted by 24 Oras anchor and GMA Kapuso Foundation founder Mel Tiangco and features inspiring stories and life experiences from both famous and ordinary people. It airs every Saturday on the network's primetime block.

The following are the lists of Magpakailanman episodes since 2020, listed by the year they were aired.

== Series overview ==
- List of Magpakailanman episodes (2002–2007)#Episodes
- List of Magpakailanman episodes (2012–2019)#Episodes
- List of Magpakailanman episodes (2020–present)#Episodes

== Episodes ==
=== 2020 ===
| No. | Title | Cast | Directed by | Written by | Original release date |
|---|---|---|---|---|---|
| 1 | "Tanging Ina ng Lahat" (The Amelia Calma Story) | Irma Adlawan, Allan Paule | Zig Madamba Dulay | Vienuel Ello | January 4, 2020 |
For many people, the saying "The more, the merrier" is a statement for them. But, in the case of Amelia, whom she had 21 children, the more children she had, the greater the suffering. Supporting Cast: Yuan Francisco, Elle Ramirez, Orlando Sol, Rere Madrid, Jerick Dolormente, Jay Arcilla
| 2 | "Sa Aking Mga Mata" (The Ed Caluag Story) | Ed Caluag | Jorron Lee Monroy | John Roque | January 11, 2020 |
Ed Caluag, a paranormal expert, is no stranger to Philippine television as well as in social media. He became a staple name as a frequent guest in the top-rating magazine show Kapuso Mo, Jessica Soho. Despite his immense popularity, is a different side of him. Supporting Cast: Ces Quesada, Sef Cadayona, Tom Olivar, Sheila Marie Rodriguez, Skelly, Warren Tablo, Janelle Lewis, Alvin Maghanoy, Jazz Yburan
| 3 | "Ang Kabit na Walang Mukha" (The Hector and Minda Bagulbagul Story) | Max Collins, Pancho Magno | Neal del Rosario | Karen P. Lustica | January 18, 2020 |
Supporting Cast: Dexter Doria, Liezel Lopez
| 4 | "Fishergays: Mga Tigasing Sirena sa Laot" | Jak Roberto, Dave Bornea, Raphael Robles, Mela Habijian | Zig Madamba Dulay | Jessie G. Villabrille | January 25, 2020 |
Supporting Cast: Gilleth Sandico, Ashley Rivera, Royce Cabrera, Leonora Cano, Bernard Laxa, Jan Urbano
| 5 | "Dapat Ka Bang Mahalin?" | Shaira Diaz, Edgar Allan Guzman | Jorron Lee Monroy | Vienuel Ello | February 1, 2020 |
Supporting Cast: Rey PJ Abellana, Francine Prieto, Bryce Eusebio, Rein Adriano
| 6 | "Kasal sa Funeral" | Maine Mendoza, Ruru Madrid | Jorron Lee Monroy | Tina Samson-Velasco | February 8, 2020 |
Supporting Cast: Lilet, Simon Ibarra, Dani Porter
| 7 | "My Hero Dog" (The Jessy Tuazon Story) | Rita Daniela, Kristofer Martin | Don Michael Perez | Don Michael Perez | February 15, 2020 |
Supporting Cast: Rosemarie Sarita, Ollie Espino
| 8 | "A Mother's Faith" (The Elizabeth Yncierto Story) | Glydel Mercado | Neal Del Rosario | Karen P. Lustica | February 22, 2020 |
Supporting Cast: Don Umali, Jenzel Angeles, Allen Ansay, Abdul Raman
| 9 | "My Gangster Lover" | Andrea Torres, Benjamin Alves | Don Michael Perez | Tina Samson-Velasco | February 29, 2020 |
Supporting Cast: Karla Pambid, Raquel Pareño, Brent Valdez, Luri Vincent Nalus
| 10 | "The Abandoned Sisters" | Pauline Mendoza, Therese Malvar, Elijah Alejo | Neal del Rosario | Vienuel Ello | March 7, 2020 |
Supporting Cast: Rita Avila, Angel Velasco
| 11 | "The Haunted Daughter" | Smokey Manaloto, Althea Ablan | Jorron Lee Monroy | Loi Argel Nova | March 14, 2020 |
Supporting Cast: Angeli Bayani, John Kenneth Giducos
| 12 | "A Scandalous Crime" | Ashley Ortega, Lucho Ayala, Vaness del Moral | Adolf Alix Jr. | John Roque | March 21, 2020 |
Rina, a happy-go-lucky teenager would fall into the hands of Dennis. He abducts Rina and took her away. It was through his mastery of hypnosis, Rina had no choice but to follow whatever Dennis wants her to do, even if it means giving her own body to him. Supporting Cast: Leandro Baldemor, Lovely Rivero, Elle Villanueva, Zonia Mejia, Anthony Rosaldo
| 13 | "Karma ng Ama" | Victor Neri, Tina Paner, Kelvin Miranda | Rechie del Carmen | John Roque | March 28, 2020 |
Supporting Cast: Alchris Galura, Faye Lorenzo
| 14 | "Ang Pagmulat ng Binulag na Kasambahay" (The Bonita Baran Story) | Barbie Forteza | Conrado Peru | Gina Marissa Tagasa | April 4, 2020 |
Bonita who was only 17 years old when she worked as a housemaid. In her stay, she was to suffer cruelty at the hands of her employers Anna Liza Catahan (Bing Loyzaga) and her partner Reynaldo Marzan (Jong Cuenco). What's worst is that Anna Liza blinded Bonita with a hot iron. Her case became one of the most sensational cases in the Philippines that led to the apprehension of the Marzan couple and paved the way for the passing of Republic Act 10361, known as the "Kasambahay Law" that protects the rights of every housemaids in the country. Note: A disclaimer was aired by Mel Tiangco before the episode where she revealed that Bonita's life story was supposed to be aired 5 years since the show's relaunch, but had to wait for legal impediments to be cleared until the episode was finally given the green light by the GMA management. Note: Replay story on June 29, 2019. Supporting Cast: Bing Loyzaga, Jong Cuenco Don Umali, Raquel Pareño, Angela Evangelista
| 15 | "Yaya Dubai and I" | Herlene Budol | Jorron Lee Monroy | Tina Samson-Velasco | April 18, 2020 |
Note: Replay story on November 30, 2019. Supporting Cast: Lotlot de Leon, Mike Agassi, Vaness del Moral, Euwenn Aleta, Marlon Mance, Ana de Leon, Joaquin Manansala
| 16 | "Beki Basketball Beauties" | Martin Escudero, Phytos Ramirez, Buboy Villar, Donita Nose, Kelvin Miranda | Jorron Lee Monroy | Vienuel Ello | April 25, 2020 |
Note: Replay story on May 18, 2019. Supporting Cast: Ralph Noriega, Tom Olivar, Gigi Locsin, Ollie Espino, Anthony Rosaldo, Arny Ross, JC Tan
| 17 | "BUSta't Kasama Kita" (The Aurelio and Menchie Love Story) | Zoren Legaspi, Ashley Ortega | Jorron Lee Monroy | Jessie Villabrille | May 2, 2020 |
Aurelio and Menchie both met inside a bus had different ups and downs with love. Aurelio left by his love, while Menchie was dumped by her boyfriend. Note: Replay story on February 2, 2019. Supporting Cast: Bodjie Pascua, Jenine Desiderio, Archie Adamos, Ameera Johara
| 18 | "1 Milyong Pasasalamat kay Ina" | Ai-Ai delas Alas, Martin del Rosario | Rechie del Carmen | Loi Argel Nova | May 9, 2020 |
Beng (Ai-Ai delas Alas) does everything for her children especially her son Rotski (Martin del Rosario). However, Rotski suffered an accident that left him half paralyzed. In order to repay for all the sacrifices of his mother, Rotski decided to surprise her with a game show-like gift. He gave her P 1 million cash that became an instant online hit. Note: Replay story on May 25, 2019. Supporting Cast: Rey PJ Abellana, Marc Justine Alvarez, Liezel Lopez, Jenzel Angeles, Jayla Villaruel, Rein Adriano, Princess Aguilar
| 19 | "Ang Asawa Kong Aswang" | Andrea Torres, Benjamin Alves | Carlos Siguion-Reyna | Michiko Yamamoto | May 16, 2020 |
Note: Replay story on November 14, 2015. Supporting Cast: Eva Darren, Ana Feleo, Ervic Vijandre, Chinggay Riego, Tonio Quiazon, Raul Russo, Suzanne Izon
| 20 | "Ang Kamao ng Beking Boksingero" (The Yohan Golez Story) | Super Tekla, Pancho Magno | Albert Langitan | Vienuel Ello | May 23, 2020 |
Note: Replay story on June 9, 2018. Supporting Cast: Dexter Doria, Ronnie Lazaro, Lharby Policarpio, Alvin Maghanoy, Jon Romano
| 21 | "Trending: Ang Babae sa Bus" | Divine Aucina | LA Madridejos | Loi Argel Nova | May 30, 2020 |
Note: Replay story on October 22, 2016. Supporting Cast: Gardo Versoza, Joshua Dionisio, Sue Prado, Stephanie Sol, Arny Ross, Sancho Delas Alas, Pauline Mendoza
| 22 | "May Forever si Lola" (The Renato Payos and Eloisa Gonzales Story) | Gina Pareño, Jay Manalo | Neal del Rosario | Gina Marissa Tagasa | June 6, 2020 |
Rene (Jay Manalo), a 34-year old vendor and separated from her wife met then 74-year old Eloisa (Gina Pareño), also a vendor and a widow with two daughters. Their relationship started in friendship until Rene confessed his love to Eloisa despite their age gap. Note: Replay story on November 3, 2018. Supporting Cast: Mel Kimura, Aira Bermudez, Hannah Precillas, Tonio Quiazon
| 23 | "Ang Asawang Naging Kabit" | Lovi Poe | Adolf Alix Jr. | Vienuel Ello | June 13, 2020 |
Note: Replay story on September 22, 2018. Supporting Cast: Rafael Rosell, Valeen Montenegro, Jenine Desiderio, Maria Isabel Lopez, Liezel Lopez, Marika Sasaki, Ollie Espino, Marithez Samson
| 24 | "Ama Namin" (The Jesus Boy Parungao Story) | Christopher de Leon | Neal del Rosario | Rhoda Sulit | June 20, 2020 |
Note: Replay story on January 3, 2015. Supporting Cast: Rita Avila, Martin del Rosario, Mike Tan, Diva Montelaba, David Remo, Katrina Halili, Barbara Miguel, Milkcah Wynne Nacion, Gold Azeron, Selena Gonzales
| 25 | "Anak ni Mister, Kabit ni Misis" | Ina Raymundo | L.A. Madridejos | Senedy Que | June 27, 2020 |
Note: Replay story on October 10, 2015. Supporting Cast: Joko Diaz, Jeric Gonzales, Sharmaine Suarez, Prince Villanueva, Ben Isaac, Bryan Olano
| 26 | "Finding Earl" (The Doliente Family Story) | Snooky Serna, Gabby Concepcion | Bb. Joyce Bernal | Agnes Gagelonia-Uligan | July 4, 2020 |
Laurie (Snooky Serna) and Ernest Doliente (Gabby Concepcion) lived a happy life. However, things changed when their son Earl, who was only 2 years old disappeared without a trace. After 2 decades, Laurie was diagnosed with lung cancer, and her dying wish is for Earl to be found. Note: Replay story on November 12, 2016. Supporting Cast: Kate Valdez, Kyle Ocampo, Leanne Bautista, Prince Villanueva, Jude de Jesus, Carl Cervantes, Euwenn Mikael Aleta
| 27 | "Sumpa ng Kalendaryo" | Megan Young, Benjamin Alves | Jorron Lee Monroy | Vienuel Ello | July 11, 2020 |
Ronnie, a seminarian and Sonia, a novice decided to leave their Religious profession to start a new life and a family. Their luck changed when they brought a calendar with the image of the suffering Jesus Christ. Little did they know that the image that will give blessing to them, will bring bad luck to them. Note: Replay story on April 6, 2019. Supporting Cast: Rob Moya, Rosemarie Sarita
| 28 | "Dance King ng Quarantine" (The DJ Loonyo Story) | Jak Roberto | Zig Madamba Dulay | Loi Argel Nova | July 18, 2020 |
Supporting Cast: Liezel Lopez, Lovely Rivero, Jong Cuenco
| 29 | "OFW Homeless in Hong Kong" (The Mildred Perez Story) | Janice de Belen | Gil Tejada, Jr. | Suzette Doctolero & Jason John S. Lim | July 25, 2020 |
Hailing from the province of Nueva Vizcaya, Mildred (Janice de Belen) was living a simple life with her husband Ed (Cris Villanueva); together, they farm for their living. Everything turned out just fine for them until Mildred decided to work abroad as an OFW in order to sustain their family's needs, especially for her kids who are starting to grow up. How far can her sacrifices go just to provide a better life for her family, despite experiencing abuse? Note: Replay story on August 5, 2017. Supporting Cast: Cris Villanueva, Caprice Cayetano, MJ Jacobo, Rosie Talimongan, Jordan Hong
| 30 | "Tanging Ina ng Lahat" (The Amelia Calma Story) | Irma Adlawan, Allan Paule | Zig Madamba Dulay | Vienuel Ello | August 1, 2020 |
For many people, the saying "The more, the merrier" is a statement for them. But, in the case of Amelia, whom she had 21 children, the more children she had, the greater the suffering. Note: Replay story on January 4, 2020. Supporting Cast: Yuan Francisco, Elle Ramirez, Orlando Sol, Rere Madrid, Jerick Dolormente, Jay Arcilla
| 31 | "Mamili ka, Ako o Anak ko?" | Amy Austria | Neal Del Rosario | Vienuel Ello | August 8, 2020 |
Salve (Amy Austria) and Manuel (Neil Ryan Sese) are a good couple. However, when he met his soon-to-be stepdaughter Lucilla (Pauline Mendoza) things suddenly change. Note: Replay story on July 13, 2019. Supporting Cast: Neil Ryan Sese, Pauline Mendoza, Leanne Bautista, Zonia Mejia, Erlinda Villalobos
| 32 | "Walang Iwanan" (The Layug Family Story) | Rita Daniela | Rechie del Carmen | Vienuel Ello | August 15, 2020 |
The story of a Filipino family living in the United States. Rainier and Remy Layug are blessed with successful children. However, they will suffer COVID-19 in the country with the most number of cases in the world. Supporting Cast: Nonie Buencamino, Shamaine Buencamino
| 33 | "Pretty Titas of Zumba" (The True Stories of Wilma Tolledana, Helen Sambo and Liezl Corro) | Sandy Andolong, Melanie Marquez, Maria Isabel Lopez | Rechie del Carmen | Vienuel Ello | August 22, 2020 |
Wilma (Maria Isabel Lopez) had to deal with her warfreak sons and a suicidal husband. There, she met Helen (Sandy Andolong), a former OFW who is a leader of their community zumba club. Like Wilma, Helen is also dealing with her own personal life. Her husband who abused her financially is trying to reconcile with her. Another member Liezl (Melanie Marquez), an OFW also had her own problem. Her husband is using her job to have money. Despite all the problems they are facing, there is one thing that binds them, friendship. Note: Replay story on December 8, 2018. Supporting Cast: Edwin Reyes, Simon Ibarra, Mike Lloren, Dave Bornea, Kevin Sagra, Karlo Duterte, Marika Sasaki, Kelvin Miranda
| 34 | "My Gay Husband" | Edgar Allan Guzman | Zig Madamba Dulay | Vienuel Ello | August 29, 2020 |
Supporting Cast: Rez Cortez, Tanya Gomez, Ana De Leon, Chamyto Aguedan, Cora Buenaventura
| 35 | "Mga Batang Hubad" (The Cyberporn Family Story) | Klea Pineda | Adolf Alix Jr. | Vienuel Ello | September 5, 2020 |
Amid of financial scarcity in their family, the parents put their children in the online porn business to earn money and they are subsequently arrested. Note: The episode does not have the real-life guest person. Note: Replay story on August 25, 2018. Supporting Cast: Glydel Mercado, Allan Paule, Rubi Rubi, Gilleth Sandico, Chlaui Malayao, Arjan Jimenez, Bruce Roeland, John Kenneth Giducos
| 36 | "Kambal na Pagmamahal" (The Connie Guarino Story) | Katrina Halili, Dion Ignacio | LA Madridejos | Senedy Que | September 12, 2020 |
Connie and Jack are a young couple who dreamed of a happy family life. However, their happy life ended with the death of Jack. But, during the funeral of Jack, Connie noticed her husband's ghost. It turned out to be Jill, Jack's identical twin brother. Note: Replay story on August 19, 2017. Supporting Cast: Gina Alajar, Djanin Cruz, Leanne Bautista, Bryce Eusebio
| 37 | "Sinapupunang Paupahan" (The Naneth Villegas Story) | Carla Abellana | Laurice Guillen | Venjie Pallena | September 19, 2020 |
Note: Replay story on April 12, 2014. Supporting Cast: Ryan Eigenmann, Jenine Desiderio, Ina Feleo, Sue Prado, Orlando Sol
| 38 | "Patawad, Ama Ko" | Dennis Trillo | Adolf Alix Jr. | John Roque | September 26, 2020 |
Samuel suffered not only physical but emotional and psychological abuses at the hands of his own father. However, he didn't stop from proving himself. However, the abuses that he had suffered from his father led him to become disoriented until he came into an irreversable decision that he will forever regret. Note: Replay story on July 20, 2019. Supporting Cast: Allan Paule, Sheila Marie Rodriguez, Chinggay Riego, Ana De Leon, Bruce Roeland, Seth Dela Cruz, Orlando Sol
| 39 | "Viral Frontliner" (The Lorraine Pingol Story) | Shaira Diaz | Don Michael Perez | Karen P. Lustica | October 3, 2020 |
Lorraine, a cancer survivor decided to dedicate her life in saving people. One day, when she was about to go to work, she helped a homeless woman who's now about to give birth in the street, which became viral on social media despite the COVID-19 pandemic. Supporting Cast: Yayo Aguila, Luis Hontiveros, Anthony Rosaldo
| 40 | "The Lockdown Wife" | Bea Binene, Martin del Rosario | Conrado Peru | Jessie G. Villabrille | October 10, 2020 |
Lorie is married to Dexter but their relationship turns into nightmare when she is abused by him, both physically and verbally, until he intends to lock her up in the house; the abuse is shown to be even worse because Dexter expresses his delusional belief using verses from the Bible and with his delusion that he is right, he manipulates her into thinking she is "sinning" if she defies him, stands up against him, and does not follow his dictatorial rule. But with the help of her family, she manages to escape from the house, angering the delusional Dexter. He tries to have her again after the escape only to be punched by Lorie's brother, as Lorie yells at him angrily to leave, defeating the evil, delusional and possessive Dexter for good. Months later, Lorie and her family celebrates their baby's gender reveal, whilst declaring her freedom. Supporting Cast: James Teng, Maritess Joaquin
| 41 | "The Sign Language of Love" | Thea Tolentino, Jeric Gonzales | Don Michael Perez | Tina Samson-Velasco | October 17, 2020 |
Supporting Cast: Manel Sevidal, Daisy Estrada
| 42 | "Sayaw ng Buhay" (The Lairca Nicdao Story) | Bianca Umali | Neal del Rosario | Loi Argel Nova | October 24, 2020 |
Supporting Cast: Frances Makil Ignacio, Dave Bornea, Nikki Co
| 43 | "Halimaw Sa Kama" | Sanya Lopez, Pancho Magno | Don Michael Perez | Loi Argel Nova | October 31, 2020 |
Supporting Cast: Angeli Bayani, Mon Confiado
| 44 | "Fishergays: Mga Tigasing Sirena sa Laot" | Jak Roberto, Dave Bornea, Raphael Robes, Mela Habijan | Zig Madamba Dulay | Jessie G. Villabrille | November 7, 2020 |
Note: Replay story on January 25, 2020. Supporting Cast: Gilleth Sandico, Ashley Rivera
| 45 | "Little People, Big Winners" | Ella Ong, Glenn Anastacio, Jenny Botes | Mark dela Cruz | Honey Hidalgo | November 14, 2020 |
Due to the popularity of GMA's primetime drama Onanay, Wowowin conducted auditions for little women to participate in the "Willie of Fortune" segment. The three chosen contestants (Ella Ong, Glenn Anastacio and Jenny Botes) had a stroke of luck when they won the Mega Jackpot. Note: Replay story on December 15, 2018. Supporting Cast: Candy Pangilinan, Dominic Roco, Renz Valerio, Phytos Ramirez, Gilleth Sandico, Kevin Sagra, Ayeesha Cervantes, Geraldine Villamil, Mega Unciano
| 46 | "Don't Chat with Strangers" | Glydel Mercado | LA Madridejos | Jessie G. Villabrille | November 21, 2020 |
Rica Basco meet the stranger named Edgar Martinez, whom she first met on social media. Their relationship soon develops but when Edgar invites her to his house, he rapes her. The police rescues Rica and arrests Edgar. Note: Replay story on November 7, 2015. Supporting Cast: Neil Ryan Sese, Kier Legaspi, Jazz Ocampo, Lou Sison, Ana Castro
| 47 | "Mister, Bugbog Kay Misis" | Andrea Torres, Juancho Trivino | Neal Del Rosario | Karen P. Lustica | November 28, 2020 |
Mark is forced by his father to marry Arlene, hoping to flourish his family's business. Mark works as a security guard but his poor income as well as his lack of strategy to his job, and apparent dating with other woman causes Arlene to taunt and attack Mark. With lack of financial resources, this led Arlene to work abroad, where she has another man, and dumps Mark. Heartbroken, he lives with his parents' house, where he convinces his father that Arlene abuses him; his father resents and Mark forgives him. Later, he reunites with Anna, Mark's former girlfriend who is more faithful than Arlene, and start over their relationship. Supporting Cast: Angela Alarcon, Alireza Libre
| 48 | "Viral Beki Vlogger" (The John Michael Villaflor Story) | Sef Cadayona | Conrado Peru | Vienuel Ello | December 5, 2020 |
Being gay, John Michael becomes alienated from his mother and now lives with his grandmother and his gay brother. He decides to do a video blog with his brother for a living, despite his father's disapproval. Supporting Cast: Archie Alemania, Leandro Baldemor, Brent Valdez, Marithez Samson
| 49 | "Batik: Ang Santa Claus ng Tarlac" (The Alberto Sebastian Story) | Super Tekla | Rechie del Carmen | Loi Argel Nova | December 12, 2020 |
Note: Replay story on December 9, 2017. Supporting Cast: Chanda Romero, Gladys Reyes, Odette Khan, Diva Montelaba, Zymic Jaranilla, Arjan Jimenez
| 50 | "My Everlasting Love" (The Joji and Alyssa Mendoza Story) | Barbie Forteza | Jorron Lee Monroy | Karen P. Lustica | December 19, 2020 |
Aly is the only children of Bing and Joji. When Bing dies from diabetes, Aly discovers that he sent email to her before his death, instructing to follow his wishes for the whole family. Supporting Cast: Isay Alvarez, Robert Seña
| 51 | "Palengke Queen ng Quarantine" (The Merlinda Nacario Story) | LJ Reyes, Ervic Vijandre | Mark dela Cruz | Tina Samson-Velasco | December 26, 2020 |
Initially working as a housemaid, Merlinda meets Henry but she is soon kicked out by her employer over her relationship. They married but Merlinda discovers that Henry has already married with another woman and a child; despite this, Merlinda refuses to leave him. Henry eventually leaves her for another woman, leaving her broke. When the COVID-19 pandemic broke out, she decides to do "mobile palengke" business to earn money. Supporting Cast: Faith da Silva, Mark Dionisio, Tess Bomb, Ana Castro

=== 2021 ===
| No. | Title | Cast | Directed by | Written by | Original release date |
|---|---|---|---|---|---|
| 1 | "BSF: Best Sisters Forever" (The Lagdamat Sisters Story) | Sunshine Dizon, Diana Zubiri, Sheena Halili, Sanya Lopez | Gil Tejada, Jr. | Jessie G. Villabrille | January 2, 2021 |
The four sisters are put into greatest challenges when one of them is diagnosed with chronic kidney disease. Note: Replay story on November 4, 2017. Supporting Cast: Snooky Serna, Rafa Siguion-Reyna, Juancho Trivino
| 2 | "Krimen ng Isang Ina" | Rochelle Pangilinan, Mike Tan | Jorron Lee Monroy | Loi Argel Nova | January 9, 2021 |
After Emily is pregnant with Rommel and loses the first two babies on birth, she realizes that she has a cervical incompetence. She is pregnant for the third time, this time she visits the clinic regularly to ensure the safety of the baby. However, when she learns that they had to pay bigger for the treatment, Emily steals the money from the safe of the lending company she is working at. After Emily successfully gives birth, she is arrested for thief and is brought before the company president, who gives her a chance to return the money she stole to avoid jail time. Supporting Cast: Froilan Manto
| 3 | "I Married My Rapist" | Mark Herras, Anna Vicente | Neal del Rosario | Karen P. Lustica | January 16, 2021 |
Rose goes to Manila to find a job where she meets Benji who tries to make advances to flirt Rose. When Rose refuses to accept relationship with him, the latter rapes Rose. To dismiss the case, Benji bribes her mother, who manipulates Rose into marry him, which she does. After enduring the ordeal with Benji, who constantly abuses her, Rose and her father Raul caught Benji apparently dating with other woman and Raul assaults him. Rose decides to divorce him and her mother finally sides with her, regretting for marrying an evil Benji. Rose meets another man, her co-worker, who is good to her, and they start their happy relationship. At the last resort, a jealous Benji follows the two and fights with the man but Benji is shot by Rose with his own gun and is jailed for his crimes. Supporting Cast: Bryan Benedict, Meng Canlas, Richard Manabat
| 4 | "Babala at Pangitain" (The Rudy Baldwin Story) | Max Collins, Ina Feleo | Conrado Peru | Vienuel Ello | January 23, 2021 |
The story of a psychic Rodeliza Fernandez more commonly known as Rudy Baldwin, who is known for posting her predictions on social media. Supporting Cast: Ces Dela Cruz, Raffy Tejada
| 5 | "Mahal Ko ang Asawa ng Ama Ko" | Katrina Halili | Paul Sta. Ana | John Roque | January 30, 2021 |
Following his mother's separation, an adolescent Bong becomes attracted with his father's new girlfriend and would-be stepmother named Mikaela and secretly begins his relationship to her behind his father's back. Note: Replay story on January 5, 2019. Supporting Cast: Allan Paule, Dion Ignacio, Bruce Roeland, Kelvin Miranda, Marc Justine Alvarez, Gigi Locsin, Ana Castro, Jun Palatao
| 6 | "Masahista for Hire" | Royce Cabrera | Mark dela Cruz | Benson Logronio | February 6, 2021 |
Macoy's family is shattered when his father becomes alcoholic, resulting his mother to leave the family due to father's abusiveness. Macoy has to stop studying to find a job to raise money. When his father suffers heart attack and is hospitalized as a result of heavy drinking, as well as his mother is arrested for drug dealing, Macoy applies as a masseur to pay the hospital bill and bail his mother out. Supporting Cast: Neil Ryan Sese, Alma Concepcion, Rob Sy, Kim de Leon
| 7 | "Gua ai Di / I Love You" (The Richard Yap and Melody Yap Love Story) | David Licauco, Shaira Diaz | Don Michael Perez | Tina Samson-Velasco | February 13, 2021 |
Raised from the Chinese family, Richard Yap meets Filipina girl Melody and they start their relationship despite his father's commitment that he must marry a Chinese girl. Supporting Cast: Ricardo Cepeda, Joyce Ching
| 8 | "Rape Victim, Ikinulong?" | Kyline Alcantara | Don Michael Perez | Karen P. Lustica | February 20, 2021 |
Krizzia Kate Yuzon decides to work in Dubai to earn a living for her family. She would also go out on a party after work where she met Dave. One night, she was on a party when she fainted. There, Dave raped her while unconscious. Instead of having justice for herself, she was imprisoned for being a prostitute. While in prison, she decided to surrender her life to the Lord and would become a Christian pastor. Supporting Cast: Sharmaine Arnaiz, Luis Hontiveros, Elle Villanueva
| 9 | "My Stalker Girlfriend" | Kate Valdez, Migo Adecer | Don Michael Perez | Loi Argel Nova | February 27, 2021 |
Christine meets the pharmacist named Enzo and begins to fall in love with him but Enzo ignores her advances. Despite this, Christine stops at nothing in order to win his heart. Supporting Cast: Karenina Haniel, Jerick Dolormente, Omar Flores
| 10 | "When I Fall in Laugh" (The Vincent "Petite" Aychoco Story) | Kevin Santos | Conrado Peru | Vienuel Ello | March 6, 2021 |
Petite is a gay who lives with his strict father and is alienated from his mother. He meets the girl named Jessica and they later married. Jessica also invites her daughter named Alma at Petite's house, but to Petite's disgust, his father starts a relationship with Alma. Supporting Cast: Snooky Serna, Dennis Padilla, Ashley Rivera, Eliza Sarmiento
| 11 | "The Abused Pregnant Wife" | Liezel Lopez, Rodjun Cruz | Don Michael Perez | Benson Logronio | March 13, 2021 |
Aila develops a relationship with Randy and becomes pregnant. Because of this, Aila decides to live in Randy's house where, however, things get worse when Randy's mother and sister constantly mistreat her. Note: Due to sensitivity of the story, certain names and location were changed. Supporting Cast: Glenda Garcia, Gilleth Sandico, Elle Ramirez, Lowell Conales
| 12 | "Isang Mister, Lima Ang Misis" | Rochelle Pangilinan | Laurice Guillen | Vienuel Ello | March 20, 2021 |
Joseph marries Elaine but upon discovering that Joseph had already been married to another woman named Madel, Elaine divorces him. Joseph later reveals that he had married three other women. Note: Replay story on November 21, 2015. Supporting Cast: Jay Manalo, Ina Feleo, Wynwyn Marquez, Ana Capri, Will Ashley de Leon, Kyle Ocampo, Barbara Miguel, Stephanie Sol
| 13 | "The Ultimate Survivor" (The Amazing Story of Betong) | Buboy Villar | Conrado Peru | John Roque | March 27, 2021 |
Despite his insecurity of his appearance and the financial problems of his family, Betong Sumaya does not hinder his wishes to pursue his work. Supporting Cast: Candy Pangilinan, Epy Quizon, Crystal Paras
| 14 | "Sa Kamay ng Fake Healer" | Jennylyn Mercado | Don Michael Perez | Vienuel Ello | April 10, 2021 |
Mylene didn't quite think that the man she believed could help her and make her cousin happy would bring a curse on her family. Supporting Cast: Juancho Triviño, Anthony Falcon
| 15 | "Ina Ko, Bugaw Ko" | Cherie Gil, Gabbi Garcia | Neal del Rosario | Senedy Que | April 17, 2021 |
A single mother Magda is selling jewelries to earn money for her children. However, when her items is mugged by the riding-in-tandem syndicate that leaves her jobless and got into debts, Magda has no choice but to sell the dignity of her daughter Pia to older men. Note: Replay story on September 5, 2015. Supporting Cast: Leo Martinez, Phytos Ramirez, Gilleth Sandico, Lindsay de Vera, Kenneth Paul Cruz, Sean Ross, Citadel Mariano, Mimi Juareza
| 16 | "My Psychotic Husband" | Lovi Poe, Gabby Eigenmann, Alessandra De Rossi | Maryo J. de los Reyes | Aloy Adlawan | April 24, 2021 |
Note: Replay story on March 22, 2014. Supporting Cast: Marita Zobel, Aicelle Santos, Dan Alvaro, Hershey Garcia, Janna Trias, Prince Vinluan
| 17 | "Ang Sakripisyo ng Isang Ina" (The Nancy Cañares Story) | Nora Aunor | Maryo J. de los Reyes | Vienuel Ello | May 1, 2021 |
Note: Replay story on October 17, 2015. Supporting Cast: Ricky Davao, Diva Montelaba, Angeli Bayani, Chlaui Malayao, Rexcy Evert, Mannix Mannix, Cathy Remperas, Enrico Reyes, Roy Sotero
| 18 | "Anak, Saan Kami Nagkamali?" | Ai-Ai Delas Alas, Snooky Serna | Joel Lamangan | Agnes G. Gagelonia-Uligan | May 8, 2021 |
Incapable of looking after her children, Mercy (Ai-Ai Delas Alas) decided to let her child, Shirlyn (Jhoana Marie Tan), be adopted by Lourdes (Snooky Serna) – her sister-in-law who's wanted to have a daughter. Lourdes takes Shirlyn and raises her as a daughter, making her adoption a secret from her. Shirlyn grows up believing that Lourdes is her real mother, so when she finds out the truth that she is an adopted child all along, her behavior changes and she starts to rebel against both of her mothers. Note: Replay story on January 9, 2016. Supporting Cast: Emilio Garcia, Allan Paule, Jhoana Marie Tan, Jak Roberto, Jim Pebanco, Bryan Benedict
| 19 | "Reyna ng Tubig" (The Jay Kummer "Dodoy" Teberio Story) | Super Tekla, Kenneth Medrano | Mark dela Cruz | Jessie G. Villabrille | May 15, 2021 |
An episode shot entirely in Cebu, Dodoy (Super Tekla) is a happy positive-minded student. Little did he know that he is gay and his family already knew about his true identity. In order to earn for his studies, he sells water along the streets of Cebu. Note: Replay story on July 8, 2017. Supporting Cast: Nanette Inventor, Stephanie Sol, Afi Africa, Marlon Hofer, Albert Vestil, Clare Sanchez, Eviane Soriano
| 20 | "Husband for Sale" | Carla Abellana, Rafael Rosell, Katrina Halili | LA Madridejos | Senedy Que | May 22, 2021 |
Note: Replay story on September 26, 2015. Supporting Cast: Rey PJ Abellana, Rap Fernandez, Karla Pambid, Justin de Leon
| 21 | "Kuya Na, Nanay Pa" (The Alexis Peralta Story) | John Kenneth Giducos | Neal del Rosario | Loi Argel Nova | May 29, 2021 |
Note: Replay story on December 1, 2018. Supporting Cast: Ana Capri, Marco Alcaraz, Ervic Vijandre, Janna Dominguez, Chinggay Riego, Seth dela Cruz, Jude Paolo Diangson, Euwenn Aleta, Khaine dela Cruz, Kyle Kaizer
| 22 | "Prisoners of Love" (The Michael Elperos Story) | Kristofer Martin, Elle Villanueva | Conrado Peru | John Roque | June 5, 2021 |
Supporting Cast: Victor Anastacio, Don Umali
| 23 | "Mahal Kita, Mahal Mo Siya" | Dion Ignacio, Maxine Medina | Neal del Rosario | Vienuel Ello | June 12, 2021 |
Supporting Cast: Arny Ross, Yvette Sanchez, Nikki Co
| 24 | "Kaibigan Sa Umaga, Aswang Sa Gabi" | Sheryl Cruz | Frasco S. Mortiz | Vienuel Ello | June 19, 2021 |
Arlyn and Glorie became even closer to each other as they studied medicine. One day, the former was surprised when he discovered that his best friend is a wicked being ("aswang"). Supporting Cast: Tina Paner, Richard Quan
| 25 | "Batang Madrasta" | Gardo Versoza, Angela Alarcon | Rechie del Carmen | Benson Logronio | June 26, 2021 |
Supporting Cast: Jenine Desiderio, Prince Clemente, Erin Ocampo
| 26 | "Ang Pagmamahal ng Isang Amang... Beki" (The Jeremy Sabido Story) | Cris Villanueva, Miguel Tanfelix | Neal del Rosario | Jessie G. Villabrille | July 3, 2021 |
A StarStruck season 7 avenger Jeremy (Miguel Tanfelix) was adopted by a gay beautician Pepito (Cris Villanueva) after his father abandoned him and his siblings. He grew up with Pepito as his father. Although he is gay, Pepito gave all the love and obligations as a father to Jeremy. Note: Replay story on October 7, 2017. Supporting Cast: Leandro Baldemor. Mel Martinez, Jude De Jesus, Kyle Ocampo, Mara Alberto, Nicole Donesa, Prince Villanueva, Joshua Jacobe, Ranty Portento
| 27 | "Nanay Kontesera" | Pokwang | Rechie del Carmen | Benson Logronio | July 10, 2021 |
Supporting Cast: Boom Labrusca, Tart Carlos, Ayra Mariano, Gold Aceron
| 28 | "Asawa at Kabit sa Isang Bubong" | Martin del Rosario | Rechie del Carmen | Loi Argel Nova | July 17, 2021 |
Supporting Cast: Katrina Halili, Kris Bernal, Ollie Espino
| 29 | "From Russia With Love" | Max Collins, Nico Antonio | Don Michael Perez | Vienuel Ello | July 24, 2021 |
Supporting Cast: Tanya Gomez, Alberto Bruno
| 30 | "Biktima ng Gayuma" | Pancho Magno, Rhian Ramos | Don Michael Perez | John Roque | July 31, 2021 |
German begins his relationship with Jenny via text but when he meet her in person, German is shocked by her appearance and she is not the person that he expected. However, Jenny turns out to be abusive and uses her amulet to trance him into staying with her. Supporting Cast: Riel Lomadilla, Maritess Joaquin
| 31 | "I Will Survive" (The Lynlin Enriquez Dumoran Story) | Tonton Gutierrez, Glydel Mercado | Neal del Rosario | Loi Argel Nova | August 7, 2021 |
Supporting Cast: Kiel Rodriguez, Jeremy Sabido, Jennifer Maravilla
| 32 | "Our Abusive Father" | Ashley Ortega, Therese Malvar, Althea Ablan | Jorron Lee Monroy | Benson Logronio | August 14, 2021 |
Supporting Cast: Michael Flores, Nina Ricci Alagao
| 33 | "Fat and Furious: The Adventures of Boobsie" (The Mary Jane Arrabis Vallero Story) | Boobsie | Rechie del Carmen | Senedy Que | August 21, 2021 |
Note: Replay story on May 20, 2017. Supporting Cast: Jay Manalo, Elizabeth Oropesa, Jhoana Marie Tan, Cai Cortez, Prince Clemente, Jong Cuenco, Kenken Nuyad, Makee Dulalia, Tonette Gulao
| 34 | "Lotto Winner, Naging Loser" | Super Tekla | LA Madridejos | Michiko Yamamoto | August 28, 2021 |
Erwin who lived a simple life nothing wanted but to have a good life for his wife Virgie and their children. His luck changed when he won 79 Million Pesos in the Lottery Draw. Because he is so naive of his winnings, he entrusted his winning ticket to his cousins Manuel (Ian de Leon) and Angel (Tonio Quiazon). However, when he received the money, he only received 3.9 Million Pesos. Little did he know that his cousins whom he entrusted had already taken advantage of the money that he had won to use for their own interests. Note: Replay story on July 6, 2019. Supporting Cast: Ian de Leon, Vaness del Moral, Dexter Doria, Tonio Quiazon
| 35 | "Viral Siblings" (The Bilog and Bunak Tiongson Story) | Leanne Bautista, Kenken Nuyad | Rechie del Carmen | Senedy Que | September 4, 2021 |
Two siblings are share a funny viral video in the internet just to let their dad go back to the family. Note: Replay story on February 18, 2017. Supporting Cast: Lotlot de Leon, Gardo Versoza, Barbara Miguel, Karla Pambid, Banjo Romero
| 36 | "Pasaway Na Iskolar" | Kelvin Miranda | Zig Madamba Dulay | Loi Argel Nova | September 11, 2021 |
Supporting Cast: Rita Avila, Prince Clemente, Sophia Senoron
| 37 | "Gua ai Di / I Love You" (The Richard Yap and Melody Yap Love Story) | David Licauco, Shaira Diaz | Don Michael Perez | Tina Samson-Velasco | September 18, 2021 |
Raised from the Chinese family, Richard Yap meets Filipina girl Melody and they start their relationship despite his father's commitment that he must marry a Chinese girl. Note: Replay story on February 13, 2021. Supporting Cast: Ricardo Cepeda, Joyce Ching
| 38 | "My First My Forever" | Klea Pineda, Mark Herras | Neal del Rosario | Vienuel Ello | September 25, 2021 |
Supporting Cast: Dominic Roco, Maey Bautista
| 39 | "Pa-mine: Online Body Selling" | Dave Bornea, Luke Conde | Jorron Lee Monroy | Vienuel Ello | October 2, 2021 |
Supporting Cast: Raquel Pareño, Karenina Haniel, James Teng
| 40 | "Rebeldeng Anak, Ulirang Ina (Part 1)" (The Elaine Carriedo-Lozano Story) | Yasmien Kurdi | Adolf Alix Jr. | Benson Logronio | October 9, 2021 |
Elaine was only a rising singer at that time, when she became rebellious. There, she started to use drugs causing her downfall. Supporting Cast: Gilleth Sandico, JC Tiuseco, Marlon Mance
| 41 | "Rebeldeng Anak, Ulirang Ina (Part 2)" (The Elaine Carriedo-Lozano Story) | Yasmien Kurdi | Adolf Alix Jr. | Benson Logronio | October 16, 2021 |
After many years, Elaine is starting a new life with her family. Supporting Cast: Gilleth Sandico, Pancho Magno, JC Tiuseco, Jerick Dolormente, Allen Ansay, Vanessa Pena, Marlon Mance
| 42 | "A Girl Named Hipon" (The Herlene Budol Story) | Herlene "Hipon Girl" Budol | Rechie del Carmen | Vienuel Ello | October 23, 2021 |
In Filipino pop culture, the word "Hipon" refers to a person with a beautiful body, except for the face. But for Herlene, the term Hipon gave her fame. From being just a contestant, she was given a big break by becoming a regular host of Wowowin. Supporting Cast: Maureen Larrazabal, Maxine Medina, Gardo Versoza, Gino Ilustre
| 43 | "The Haunted Daughter" | Smokey Manaloto, Althea Ablan | Jorron Lee Monroy | Loi Argel Nova | October 30, 2021 |
Note: Replay story on March 14, 2020. Supporting Cast: Angeli Bayani, John Kenneth Giducos
| 44 | "Boxer And His Scholar" (The Jonel and Mylen Borbon Story) | Jak Roberto, Elle Villanueva | Don Michael Perez | John Roque | November 6, 2021 |
Supporting Cast: Shermaine Santiago
| 45 | "Ibalik Mo sa Akin ang Anak Ko" | Gabby Concepcion, Inah de Belen | LA Madridejos | John Roque | November 13, 2021 |
Note: Replay story on June 16, 2018. Supporting Cast: Valerie Concepcion, Chinggay Riego, Tom Olivar, Analyn Barro, Raul Russo, Jon Achaval, Kiko Matos
| 46 | "Male Sex Slave sa Saudi" | Jeric Gonzales | Don Michael Perez | Vienuel Ello | November 20, 2021 |
Note: Replay story on April 27, 2019. Supporting Cast: Denise Barbacena, Sue Prado, Juan Rodrigo, Geraldine Villamil, Joaquin Manansala, Raul Russo, Bryan del Rosario, Julius Miguel
| 47 | "Never Give Up" (The Ken Chan and Rita Daniela Story) | Ken Chan, Rita Daniela | Philip Lazaro | Jessie G. Villabrille | November 27, 2021 |
Before being known for their characters as Boyet and Aubrey in My Special Tatay, Rita Daniela and Ken Chan started their showbiz careers as a young age. Rita came to stardom when she won in the singing search Popstar Kids. Ken, who came from a Filipino-Chinese family rise to stardom as part of Tween Hearts. Note: Replay story on March 2, 2019. Supporting Cast: Sharmaine Arnaiz, Shyr Valdez, Jong Cuenco, William Lorenzo, Nicole Donesa
| 48 | "Baklash" (The Viral Prinsesitas' Showdown) | Sander "Lala" Vileganio, Mark Jhay "MJ" Ortega | Jorron Lee Monroy | Jessie G. Villabrille | December 4, 2021 |
Note: Replay story on November 2, 2019. Supporting Cast: Jay Manalo, Lovely Rivero, Candy Pangilinan, Epi Quizon, Orlando Sol, Tess Bomb, Rob Moya, Carlo Cannu, Marinella Alexa Sevidal
| 49 | "My Everlasting Love" (The Joji and Alyssa Mendoza Story) | Barbie Forteza | Jorron Lee Monroy | Karen P. Lustica | December 11, 2021 |
Aly is the only children of Bing and Joji. When Bing dies from diabetes, Aly discovers that he sent email to her before his death, instructing to follow his wishes for the whole family. Note: Replay story on December 19, 2020. Supporting Cast: Isay Alvarez, Robert Seña
| 50 | "May Forever Sa Tabo" (The Jolo and Rain Argales Story) | Yasser Marta, Riel Lomadilla | Neal del Rosario | Benson Logronio | December 18, 2021 |
Supporting Cast: Tanya Gomez, Mitch Lim, Froilan Manto, Lei Rosario
| 51 | "Ang Tunay Na Kulay Ng Pasko" (The Jessy Hernandez Story) | Abed Green | Neal del Rosario | Benson Logronio | December 25, 2021 |
Supporting Cast: Rita Avila, William Lorenzo, Liezel Lopez, Abdul Raman, Jessy Hernandez

=== 2022 ===
| No. | Title | Cast | Directed by | Written by | Original release date |
|---|---|---|---|---|---|
| 1 | "Sa Ngalan Ng Anak" (The Fidel Madrideo Nacion Story) | Christopher De Leon, Ruru Madrid | Zig Madamba Dulay | John Roque | January 1, 2022 |
Fidel must deal with his mentally disabled son, Ryan. When Ryan becomes violent and manic, Fidel has no other choice but to reluctantly send him to the mental facility. Supporting Cast: Bing Pimentel, Shaira Diaz, Mikoy Morales, Jeremy Sabido, Shanicka Arganda, Dave Duque
| 2 | "Balut Vendor Turned Inventor" (The Roland Barrientos Story) | Gabby Eigenmann | Neal Del Rosario | Loi Argel Nova | January 8, 2022 |
Roland struggles financially as a balot vendor, causes his wife to leave the family for good. When Roland finds his new love life, his daughter forsakes him, until Roland decides to make his own invention called "drum car" to get along with the family. Supporting Cast: Rochelle Pangilinan, Ashley Ortega, Myrtle Sarrosa
| 3 | "Footless and Fearless" (The Diego Garcia Story) | Miguel Tanfelix | Neal Del Rosario | John Roque | January 15, 2022 |
Born without legs, Diego becomes recognized when his TikTok videos gain more views. Supporting Cast: Sharmaine Arnaiz, Paul Salas, Mike Lloren, Sophia Senoron, Saviour Ramos
| 4 | "The Sign Language of Love" | Thea Tolentino, Jeric Gonzales | Don Michael Perez | Tina Samson-Velasco | January 22, 2022 |
Note: Replay story on October 17, 2020. Supporting Cast: Manel Sevidal, Daisy Estrada
| 5 | "Liwanag Ng Bituin" (The Estrella "Star" Besabe Story) | Pokwang | Monti Parungao | Vienuel Ello | January 29, 2022 |
Star keep a secret from her three children that she and her husband are divorced. When her children find out about this, her relationship with them becomes strained. Supporting Cast: Jon Lucas, Royce Cabrera, Dave Bornea, Skelly Skelly
| 6 | "Kapag Lumingon Ka, Akin Ka" (The Amado "Madz" Aguilar Story) | Mark Herras, Sef Cadayona | Conrado Peru | Vienuel Ello | February 5, 2022 |
Madz grew up in a broken family but that did not stop him from having a happy disposition despite hardships in life. After entering Philippine show business as an extra, he rose from the ranks and became one of GMA's dependable production staff. He became an internet sensation after his online video "Kapag Lumingon Ka, Akin Ka" challenge became popular. Note: Replay story on October 13, 2018. Supporting Cast: Melissa Mendez, Toby Alejar, Ervic Vijandre, Shermaine Santiago, Kiel Rodriguez, Nikki Co, Jenzel Angeles
| 7 | "Asido Sa Kamay Ng Asawa" | Max Collins | Neal Del Rosario | Tina Samson-Velasco | February 12, 2022 |
Supporting Cast: Martin del Rosario, Lovely Rivero
| 8 | "Lies & Secrets" (The Julio Millet Bocauto Story) | Tom Rodriguez | Adolf Alix Jr. | Loi Argel Nova | February 19, 2022 |
Supporting Cast: Bryce Eusebio, Faye Lorenzo, Shamaine Buencamino, Maritess Joaquin, Dentrix Ponce
| 9 | "Queen of Piyok" (The Danieca Areglado Goc-Ong Story) | Rita Daniela | Frasco Mortiz | Benson Logronio | February 26, 2022 |
Supporting Cast: Leandro Baldemor, Tina Paner, Luis Hontiveros, Yvette Sanchez, Vincent Magbanua
| 10 | "The Blind Runner" (The Mark Joseph "Aga" Casidsid Story) | Kokoy de Santos | Neal Del Rosario | John Roque | March 5, 2022 |
Supporting Cast: Snooky Serna, William Lorenzo, Kristofer Martin, Marx Topacio
| 11 | "Walang Ganun, Mars!" (The Richo Bautista Story) | Tetay | Monti Parungao | Vienuel Ello | March 12, 2022 |
Supporting Cast: Mitch Valdez, Anna Marin, Claire Castro, Kimson Tan
| 12 | "The Illegal Wife" | Sheryl Cruz, Gary Estrada | Gina Alajar | Benson Logronio | March 19, 2022 |
Supporting Cast: Bruce Roeland, Raquel Monteza
| 13 | "My Father's Killer" | Miggs Cuaderno | Zig Madamba Dulay | Loi Argel Nova | March 26, 2022 |
Supporting Cast: Eula Valdes, Neil Ryan Sese, Elijah Alejo, Rosemarie Sarita, Harvey Quimbo
| 14 | "My Bipolar Mom" | Jackie Lou Blanco, Barbie Forteza | Neal del Rosario | John Roque | April 2, 2022 |
Supporting Cast: Mike Magat, Kirst Viray, Ashley Monville, Sharmane Monville
| 15 | "Fiancé Or Financier" (The Rose Vega Story) | Herlene "Hipon" Budol, Juan Rodrigo, Marco Alcaraz | Jorron Lee Monroy | Vienuel Ello | April 9, 2022 |
Supporting Cast: Marithez Samson, Melissa Avelino, Lee O'Brian
| 16 | "My Stalker Girlfriend" | Kate Valdez, Migo Adecer | Don Michael Perez | Loi Argel Nova | April 23, 2022 |
Christine meets the pharmacist named Enzo and begins to fall in love with him but Enzo ignores her advances. Despite this, Christine stops at nothing in order to win his heart. Note: Replay story on February 27, 2021. Supporting Cast: Karenina Haniel, Jerick Dolormente, Omar Flores
| 17 | "Ampon Man Sa Iyong Paningin" (The Jane Magbanua Story) | Liezel Lopez | Neal Del Rosario | Vienuel Ello | April 30, 2022 |
Supporting Cast: Nonie Buencamino, Sharmaine Arnaiz, Jon Lucas, Jay Arcilla, Juancho Trivino
| 17 | "Hustisya Sa Aking Kamay" | Rocco Nacino, Ashley Ortega | Neal Del Rosario | Tina Samson-Velasco | May 7, 2022 |
Supporting Cast: Gio Alvarez, Michael Roy Jornales, Erin Ocampo, Dayara Shane, Alain Cajayon
| 18 | "Teenage Mama" (The Abbygail Fernandez Story) | Elijah Alejo | Zig Madamba Dulay | Senedy Que | May 14, 2022 |
Supporting Cast: Lara Quigaman, DJ Durano, Mia Pangyarihan, Vince Crisostomo, Jeff Moses
| 19 | "When My Daughter Falls In Love" | Thea Tolentino, Martin del Rosario | Rechie Del Carmen | John Roque | May 21, 2022 |
Supporting Cast: Maila Gumila, Mike Agassi, Kim Perez, Anjay Anson
| 20 | "Batang Kampeon sa Bilyaran" | Jak Roberto | Neal Del Rosario | Karen Lustica | May 28, 2022 |
Supporting Cast: William Lorenzo, Shamaine Buencamino, Denise Barbacena, Dilek Montemayor
| 21 | "Nasaan Ka, Inay?" | Pokwang | Zig Madamba Dulay | John Roque | June 4, 2022 |
Supporting Cast: Archie Adamos, Leandro Baldemor, Gilleth Sandico, Rubi Rubi, David Remo, Euwenn Mikael Aleta, Nikki Co, Ruiz Gomez
| 22 | "The Mother Who Left" (The Fralei Gabor Story) | Rochelle Pangilinan | Rechie Del Carmen | Loi Argel Nova | June 11, 2022 |
Supporting Cast: Adrian Alandy, Jean Saburit, Ashley Rivera, Rocky Salumbides, Caprice Cayetano, Princess Aguilar
| 23 | "Ang Dakila Kong Ama" (The Dagul and Jkhriez Pastrana Story) | Dagul, Jo Berry | Mark Dela Cruz | Vienuel Ello | June 18, 2022 |
Romel Pastrana, who is more popularly known as "Dagul" never had a chance to return to showbiz due to the COVID-19 pandemic. However, the love of his family, especially his daughter Jkhriez became his source of strength. Supporting Cast: Lovely Rivero, Kim De Leon, Julius Miguel, Dentrix Ponce
| 24 | "LGBT: Love Goals, Bakla, Tomboy" | Boobay, Vaness del Moral | Mark A. Reyes | Vienuel Ello | June 25, 2022 |
Jericho is gay, while Kat in is a lesbian, and life will put them to the test as a unique LGBTQIA+ couple. Supporting Cast: Leo Martinez, Malou de Guzman, Brent Valdez, Crystal Paras, Krissy Achino, Gigi Locsin
| 25 | "Kakambal Kong Ahas" | Dennis Trillo, Rhian Ramos | LA Madridejos | Aloy Adlawan | July 2, 2022 |
Michael and Lucas (both played by Dennis Trillo) are twins who grow up with opposite temperaments. While Michael is a virtuous person, his twin brother, Lucas, is known for being a bad boy. Michael finishes his schooling and marries a woman named Melissa (Rhian Ramos) while Lucas is an undergraduate and impregnates a girl in an early age. Living a futile life, Lucas tries to seek refuge with Michael. Wanting to help his twin, he let the man live with them only to find out that his twin brother is secretly using his identity to get to his wife and it's too late before Melissa realizes that she's making love not to Michael but to her husband's twin. Note: Replay story on January 16, 2016. Supporting Cast: Shamaine Buencamino, Toby Alejar, Rosemarie Sarita, Joseph Ison, Don Umali, Stanley Calderon, Staniel Calderon
| 26 | "Kutob Ng Sukob" (The Andoy and Anabelle Delposo Story) | Benjamin Alves, Claire Castro, Faith Da Silva | Jorron Lee Monroy | Loi Argel Nova | July 9, 2022 |
Supporting Cast: Mikoy Morales, Hannah Arguelles, Anna Marin
| 27 | "Ang Pagtatapos Ng Anak" (The Felipe and Mark Sanchez Story) | Ricky Davao, Kristofer Martin | Neal Del Rosario | John Roque | July 16, 2022 |
Living a simple life, Felipe strives harder for his family especially for his asthmatic son Mark. Despite his sickness, Mark determined to finish his studies. However, Mark died just before his graduation day. Despite the grief, Felipe is determined to have his son receive his diploma. On the day of his supposed graduation, Felipe marched with a standee of his son, that brought many people especially netizens to tears. Supporting Cast: Melissa Mendez, Jhoana Marie Tan, Dani Porter, Dave Duque
| 28 | "Mister, Bugbog Kay Misis" | Andrea Torres, Juancho Trivino | Neal Del Rosario | Karen P. Lustica | July 23, 2022 |
Mark is forced by his father to marry Arlene, hoping to flourish his family's business. Mark works as a security guard but his poor income as well as his lack of strategy to his job, and apparent dating with other woman causes Arlene to taunt and attack Mark. With lack of financial resources, this led Arlene to work abroad, where she has another man, and dumps Mark. Heartbroken, he lives with his parents' house, where he convinces his father that Arlene abuses him; his father resents and Mark forgives him. Later, he reunites with Anna, Mark's former girlfriend who is more faithful than Arlene, and start over their relationship. Note: Replay story on November 28, 2020. Supporting Cast: Angela Alarcon, Alireza Libre
| 29 | "Insta-Nanay" | Bianca Umali, Rita Avila | Rechie Del Carmen | Benson Logronio | July 30, 2022 |
Supporting Cast: Ces Quesada, Mon Confiado, Prince Clemente, JM San Jose
| 30 | "Every Breath You Take" (The Andrew Schimmer and Jorhomy "Jho" Rovero Story) | Mark Herras, Arra San Agustin | Mark Dela Cruz | Benson Logronio | August 6, 2022 |
Former matinee idol Andrew Schimmer met Jho, a college student that time. Despite numerous rejections and disagreement from her family, Jho decided to give Andrew a chance and started a family. However, in November 2021, Jho suffered a cardiac arrest and remained comatose. Because he has no acting stints due to the COVID-19 pandemic, Andrew used the internet to seek help because of the increasing hospital bills, proving his unconditional love to Jho. Supporting Cast: Sherilyn Reyes-Tan, Dayara Shane, Marlon Mance, Clara del Rosario
| 31 | "Bulag Na Ilaw Ng Tahanan" (The Jane and Jes Orlino Story) | Precious Lara Quigaman, Neil Ryan Sese | Mark Dela Cruz | Vienuel Ello | August 13, 2022 |
Supporting Cast: Rosemarie Sarita, Bryce Eusebio, Clarence Delgado
| 32 | "My Husband's Secret" | Max Collins, Luis Hontiveros | Jorron Lee Monroy | Tina Samson-Velasco | August 20, 2022 |
Ester agrees to arrange a marriage with Peter, but unknown to her, Peter secretly develops a relationship with another man that could destroy their marriage. Supporting Cast: Bryan Benedict, Tanya Gomez, Alvin Fortuna, Karenina Haniel
| 33 | "My Kidney Belongs To You" (The Philip Maala and Irish Maniwang Love Story) | Sanya Lopez, Rocco Nacino | Mark A. Reyes | John Roque | August 27, 2022 |
The thrilling love story of two high school classmates, Irish and Philip, who must put their love to the test in the face of adversity. Supporting Cast: Allen Dizon, Angela Alarcon, Dolly de Leon
| 34 | "A Child's Trauma" (The Pia Pascual Hugo Story Part 1) | Rhian Ramos | Adolf Alix Jr. | Benson Logronio | September 3, 2022 |
Supporting Cast: Al Tantay, Bing Pimentel, Thia Thomalla, Kirst Viray, Ian Ignacio, Melissa Avelino, Orlando Sol, Jacob Tountas, Kiko Ipapo
| 35 | "A Mother's Triumph" (The Pia Pascual Hugo Story Part 2) | Rhian Ramos | Adolf Alix Jr. | Benson Logronio | September 10, 2022 |
Supporting Cast: Al Tantay, Bing Pimentel, Thia Thomalla, Kirst Viray, Ian Ignacio, Melissa Avelino, Orlando Sol, Jacob Tountas
| 36 | "Ang Driver Na Mr. Pogi" (The Carlo San Juan Story) | Carlo San Juan, Irma Adlawan, Allan Paule | Neal Del Rosario | Vienuel Ello | September 17, 2022 |
Supporting Cast: Jay Arcilla, Prince Stefan, Jeremy Sabido, Cheska Fausto, Ar Angel Aviles
| 37 | "Laughter & Tears" (The Tess Bomb Story) | Rufa Mae Quinto | Mark Dela Cruz | John Roque | September 24, 2022 |
Supporting Cast: Rez Cortez, Anna Marin, Ervic Vijandre, Kiel Rodriguez, Erin Ocampo, Dax Augustus
| 38 | "Basta Ilongga, Guwapa" (The Rabiya Mateo Story) | Rabiya Mateo, Sharmaine Arnaiz | Mark A. Reyes V | Vienuel Ello | October 1, 2022 |
Supporting Cast: Anjo Damiles, Riel Lomadilla, Raquel Monteza, Raheel Bhyria
| 39 | "To Love Again" (The Johncel Magundag and Jenefer Francisco Love Story) | Mikee Quintos, Kelvin Miranda | Neal Del Rosario | Benson Logronio | October 8, 2022 |
Supporting Cast: Ramon Christopher, Victor Anastacio, Anita Ramos, Lance Serrano
| 40 | "Small Boy, Big Dreams" (The Leo Consul Story) | Bruce Roeland, Lotlot de Leon, Gary Estrada, Raphael Landicho | Jorron Lee Monroy | Loi Argel Nova | October 15, 2022 |
Supporting Cast: Mike Lloren, Migs Villasis, Seth Dela Cruz, Angelica Ulip, Gigi Locsin
| 41 | "My Race to Happiness" (The Silamie Apolistar-Gutang Story) | Ashley Ortega, Rodjun Cruz | Jorron Lee Monroy | Loi Argel Nova | October 22, 2022 |
Supporting Cast: Jenine Desiderio, Luke Conde, David Remo, Gerard Pizarras, Mel Kimura, Gino Ilustre, Ashley Sarmiento
| 42 | "Sa Kamay ng Fake Healer" | Jennylyn Mercado | Don Michael Perez | Vienuel Ello | October 29, 2022 |
Mylene didn't quite think that the man she believed could help her and make her cousin happy would bring a curse on her family. Note: Replay story on April 10, 2021. Supporting Cast: Juancho Triviño, Anthony Falcon
| 43 | "Born To Be A Queen" (The Edwin Luis Story) | Royce Cabrera | Monti Parungao | Vienuel Ello | November 5, 2022 |
Supporting Cast: Benjie Paras, Candy Pangilinan, Lady Gagita
| 44 | "Huwag Kang Susuko" (The Leny Garcia Story) | Gina Alajar | Jorron Lee Monroy | John Roque | November 12, 2022 |
Leny is a selfless mother who is willing to stand up to get justice for her children who have been accused of false allegations. Supporting Cast: Dave Bornea, Kim De Leon, Joaquin Domagoso, William Lorenzo, Ella Cristofani, Shanicka Arganda
| 45 | "Fiancé Or Financier" (The Rose Vega Story) | Herlene "Hipon" Budol, Juan Rodrigo, Marco Alcaraz | Jorron Lee Monroy | Vienuel Ello | November 19, 2022 |
Note: Replay story on April 9, 2022. Supporting Cast: Marithez Samson, Melissa Avelino, Lee O'Brian
| 46 | "Listen To My Heart" (The Maegan Aguilar Story Part 1) | Sanya Lopez | Neal Del Rosario | Gina Marissa Tagasa | November 26, 2022 |
Being the daughter of OPM legend Freddie Aguilar, Maegan is doing a name for herself. However, her life would eventually be like of her father's hit song "Anak". Supporting Cast: Jason Abalos, Jon Lucas, Shyr Valdez, JM San Jose, Clara del Rosario
| 47 | "Love Me For What I Am" (The Maegan Aguilar Story Part 2) | Sanya Lopez | Neal Del Rosario | Gina Marissa Tagasa | December 3, 2022 |
Supporting Cast: Jason Abalos, Jon Lucas, Neil Ryan Sese, Dion Ignacio, Shyr Valdez, JM San Jose, Noreah Casaljay, Choline Bautista, Clara del Rosario
| 48 | "The Haunted Soul" | Bea Alonzo | Jerry Lopez Sineneng | Jessie Villabrille | December 10, 2022 |
Because of her sufferings, Lezlie has lost faith in God, prompting her to attract strange elements that normal people cannot perceive. Supporting Cast: Bing Pimentel, Marco Alcaraz, Marnie Lapus, Josh Ivan Morales
| 49 | "I Bear For You" (The Sam Cairo Story) | Jeric Gonzales | Jojo Nadela | Mark Duane Angos | December 17, 2022 |
Supporting Cast: Gardo Versoza, Jackie Lou Blanco, Therese Malvar, Angela Alarcon
| 50 | "A Christmas Miracle" (The Madrid Family Story) | Mylene Dizon | Don Michael Perez | John Roque | December 24, 2022 |
Supporting Cast: Gabby Eigenmann, Marco Masa
| 51 | "Sa Ngalan Ng Anak" (The Fidel Madrideo Nacion Story) | Christopher De Leon, Ruru Madrid | Zig Madamba Dulay | John Roque | December 31, 2022 |
Fidel must deal with his mentally disabled son, Ryan. When Ryan becomes violent and manic, Fidel has no other choice but to reluctantly send him to the mental facility. Note: Replay story on January 1, 2022. Supporting Cast: Bing Pimentel, Shaira Diaz, Mikoy Morales, Jeremy Sabido, Shanicka Arganda, Dave Duque

=== 2023 ===
| No. | Title | Cast | Directed by | Written by | Original release date |
|---|---|---|---|---|---|
| 1 | "Sana Muling Makapiling" | Glydel Mercado, Cassy Legaspi, Joyce Ching | Gina Alajar | Gina Marissa Tagasa | January 7, 2023 |
Erlin is a mother who is forced to sell her child due to financial constraints. Will her child accept her if they meet again? Supporting Cast: Raquel Pareño, Prince Clemente
| 2 | "Reyna Ng Tahanan (Part 1)" | Liezel Lopez, Lovely Rivero, Cai Cortez, Rochelle Pangilinan, Snooky Serna | Rechie del Carmen | Vienuel Ello | January 14, 2023 |
Supporting Cast: Paolo Paraiso, Jamir Zabarte, Patricia Coma, Vince Crisostomo
| 3 | "Ronda Ng Kalsada: Reyna Ng Tahanan (Part 2)" | Liezel Lopez, Lovely Rivero, Cai Cortez, Rochelle Pangilinan, Snooky Serna | Rechie del Carmen | Vienuel Ello | January 21, 2023 |
Supporting Cast: Paolo Paraiso, Jamir Zabarte, Patricia Coma, Vince Crisostomo
| 4 | "Kinulam Na Ina" | Sheryl Cruz | Neal del Rosario | Jessie Villabrille | January 28, 2023 |
Supporting Cast: Zyren dela Cruz, Leandro Baldemor, Rosemarie Sarita
| 5 | "Love Times Three" (The Joel and April Regal Love Story) | Max Collins, Edgar Allan Guzman | Jojo Nadela | John Roque | February 4, 2023 |
What would you do if one of the most important people in your life is taken from you one day? Supporting Cast: Yayo Aguila
| 6 | "The Power of Love" (The Miguel and Baby Duhaylungsod Story) | Katrina Halili, Rodjun Cruz | Rechie del Carmen | Jessie Villabrille | February 11, 2023 |
Supporting Cast: Clarence Delgado, Faye Lorenzo, Ashley Sarmiento
| 7 | "A Son's Promise" (The Kokoy de Santos Story) | Kokoy de Santos | Neal del Rosario | Vienuel Ello | February 18, 2023 |
He wanted nothing but for his family to have a better life. But, fate dictated Kokoy's destiny. This is when he started in a BL movie, and would become one of the most popular celebrities in the world of showbiz. Supporting Cast: Shamaine Buencamino, Jong Cuenco, Analyn Barro, Migs Villasis, Jennie Gabriel
| 8 | "Bayad Utang" | Therese Malvar | Neal del Rosario | Gina Marissa Tagasa | February 25, 2023 |
Supporting Cast: Dennis Padilla, Larkin Castor, Jaclyn Jose, Juharra Asayo, Kian Co, Omar Flores
| 9 | "Almost A Champion" (The Renerio "The Amazing" Arizala Story) | Martin del Rosario, Thea Tolentino | Neal del Rosario | Loi Argel Nova | March 4, 2023 |
Renerio Arizala dreamed of entering the world of professional boxing and wants to follow the footsteps of Manny Pacquiao. However, his dreams of becoming a champion boxer shattered when during one of his fights, he slipped into a coma. Supporting Cast: Jon Lucas, Mike Lloren, Marx Topacio, Glenda Garcia
| 10 | "Takas Sa Impiyerno" | Beauty Gonzalez, Lucho Ayala | Gina Alajar | Loi Argel Nova | March 11, 2023 |
Diana life turns into hellish when she suffers constant abuse at the hands of his husband Lucas, who had gone for drug business. Supporting Cast: Maritess Joaquin, Tanya Gomez, Seth dela Cruz, Tonio Quiazon
| 11 | "Mana Sa Inang Ama" (The Jester Mendoza Story) | Gabby Eigenmann, Vaness del Moral, Dexter Doria | Neal del Rosario | Vienuel Ello | March 18, 2023 |
Supporting Cast: Joaquin Manansala, Gold Aceron, Bugoy Cariño
| 12 | "A Girl Named Hipon" (The Herlene Budol Story) | Herlene "Hipon Girl" Budol | Rechie del Carmen | Vienuel Ello | March 25, 2023 |
In Filipino pop culture, the word "Hipon" refers to a person with a beautiful body, except for the face. But for Herlene, the term Hipon gave her fame. From being just a contestant, she was given a big break by becoming a regular host of Wowowin. Note: Replay story on October 23, 2021. Supporting Cast: Maureen Larrazabal, Maxine Medina, Gardo Versoza, Gino Ilustre
| 13 | "My Third Life" (The Kim Atienza Story) | Ken Chan | Gina Alajar | Loi Argel Nova | April 1, 2023 |
Being the son of a former Mayor of Manila, Kim wanted to get out of the shadow of his father and wanted to enter showbiz. But, his father wanted him to enter politics, which he didn't refuse. Afterwards, he entered the field of television and would become known as one of the top-tier television personalities today, because of his persona as the man who gives trivias and information. But, different struggles came to him. First is when he suffered a stroke. However, he was able to recover and became health conscious. But, when he's starting to become more active and healthy, he would suffer from Gullian-Barre Syndrome. But, his deep faith in God would change his life forever. Supporting Cast: Neil Ryan Sese, Isay Alvarez, Sophia Senoron, Brent Valdez
| 14 | "Viral Cancer Survivor" (The Sean Beltran Story) | Will Ashley | Mark Sicat dela Cruz | Loi Argel Nova | April 15, 2023 |
Supporting Cast: Maricar de Mesa, Marco Alcaraz, Bryce Eusebio, Caprice Cayetano, Euwenn Aleta, Lowell Conales
| 15 | "A Son's Hero" (The Bruce Roeland Story) | Bruce Roeland | Adolf Alix Jr. | Benson Logronio | April 22, 2023 |
Supporting Cast: Gelli de Belen, Rob Rownd, Leonardo Bertilotti
| 16 | "Mag-asawa, Ginayuma" | Derrick Monasterio, Kristofer Martin | Neal del Rosario | Vienuel Ello | April 29, 2023 |
Elmer and Dessa experience weird things in their relationship as they meet Raul. The latter plans a scheme to make the two couple fall in love with him. Supporting Cast: Elle Villanueva, Anna Marin
| 17 | "The Hostage Girl" | Angel Guardian | Neal del Rosario | John Roque | May 6, 2023 |
Supporting Cast: Leandro Baldemor, Maila Gumila, Ian De Leon, Kiel Rodriguez, Shanicka Arganda
| 18 | "When I Fall in Laugh" (The Vincent "Petite" Aycocho Story) | Kevin Santos | Conrado Peru | Vienuel Ello | May 13, 2023 |
Petite is a gay who lives with his strict father and is alienated from his mother. He meets the girl named Jessica and they later married. Jessica also invites her daughter named Alma at Petite's house, but to Petite's disgust, his father starts a relationship with Alma. Note: Replay story on March 6, 2021. Supporting Cast: Snooky Serna, Dennis Padilla, Ashley Rivera
| 19 | "Unlucky Girl" (The Mariel Larson Story) | Mikee Quintos | Rechie del Carmen | John Roque | May 20, 2023 |
Supporting Cast: Lito Pimentel, Candy Pangilinan, Luis Hontiveros, Angela Alarcon, Patrick Armstrong
| 20 | "Daughter's Dollhouse" (The Faye Lorenzo Story) | Faye Lorenzo | Adolfo Alix Jr. | Loi Argel Nova | May 27, 2023 |
Faye Lorenzo is a rookie comedian who builds her name in the showbiz industry, in particular with comedy series, but behind her laughter hides a dramatic past in her life. Watch the life story of Faye Lorenzo and how she conquers all the challenges in her life for her family. Supporting Cast: Gary Estrada, Bernadette Allyson, Zonia Mejia, Gigi Locsin, Vince Crisostomo
| 21 | "Luha sa Likod ng Tawa" (The Buboy Villar Story) | Buboy Villar | Jules Katanyag | Loi Argel Nova | June 3, 2023 |
Buboy Villar started his entertainment journey as a child star. Later on, he became part of the cast in some of GMA's most popular shows. Watch the life story of Buboy Villar and what he went through before achieving fame Supporting Cast: Smokey Manaloto, Tina Paner, Ervic Vijandre, TG Daylusan, Dani Porter, JM San Jose, Arkin Torres
| 22 | "The Abused Teacher" | Rochelle Pangilinan, Pancho Magno | Rechie del Carmen | John Roque | June 10, 2023 |
Supporting Cast: Ina Feleo, Kim Belles
| 23 | "My Missing Daughter" (The Antonio Cordeta Story) | Edgar Allan Guzman, Liezel Lopez | Jules Katanyag | Vienuel Ello | June 17, 2023 |
Supporting Cast: Malou de Guzman, Ashley Sarmiento, Joshua Bulot
| 24 | "Born To Be A Queen" (The Edwin Luis Story) | Royce Cabrera | Monti Parungao | Vienuel Ello | June 24, 2023 |
Note: Replay story on November 5, 2022. Supporting Cast: Benjie Paras, Candy Pangilinan, Lady Gagita
| 25 | "Ang Hiling sa Diyos" (The Vance Uy-Cuaki Story) | Rhian Ramos | Neal del Rosario | Gina Marissa Tagasa | July 1, 2023 |
What would you do if your mother left you one day? Are you willing to forgive her? Supporting Cast: Marina Benipayo, Gilleth Sandico, Jong Cuenco, Cassy Lavarias
| 26 | "When Love Returns" (The Bang Valles and Kulas Villasoto Story) | Angelu de Leon, Bobby Andrews | Neal del Rosario | Benson Logronio | July 8, 2023 |
Bang and Kulas prove that the old saying 'nothing lasts forever' is not true. Watch how they overcome the challenges in their lives. Supporting Cast: Kate Valdez, Kelvin Miranda, Migs Villasis
| 27 | "Male Rape Victim" | Kokoy de Santos | Jules Katanyag | Loi Argel Nova | July 15, 2023 |
Supporting Cast: Bernard Palanca, Samantha Lopez, Prince Clemente
| 28 | "Queen of Piyok" (The Danieca Areglado Goc-Ong Story) | Rita Daniela | Frasco Mortiz | Benson Logronio | July 22, 2023 |
Note: Replay story on February 26, 2022. Supporting Cast: Leandro Baldemor, Tina Paner, Luis Hontiveros, Yvette Sanchez, Vincent Magbanua
| 29 | "Inang Walang Pamilya" | Ai-Ai Delas Alas | Gina Alajar | Gina Marissa Tagasa | July 29, 2023 |
They say that parents can't endure their children, but can a child tolerate their parents? Watch the life story of Rose about her broken relationship with her kids and how they reconcile with each other. Supporting Cast: Neil Ryan Sese, Joyce Ching, Jay Arcilla, Julia Pascual, Via Veloso, Ian Ignacio, Lee Loyola
| 30 | "A Runner to Remember" (The Jirome De Castro Story) | Alden Richards | Neal del Rosario | Loi Argel Nova | August 5, 2023 |
Jerome is a marathon runner but his ambition breaks suddenly when he is diagnosed with dystonia. Note: Part of Alden August Supporting Cast: Sanya Lopez, Gio Alvarez, Jeffrey Tam, Brent Valdez
| 31 | "Epal Dreamboy" (The Richard Licop Story) | Alden Richards | Irene Emma Villamor | John Roque | August 12, 2023 |
Richard Licop is dubbed an attention seeker in their community because of his social media posts, but behind this, a lot of people were unaware that he had to overcome many obstacles before achieving success. Watch how Richard goes through his life with a lot of hate and negative comments. Note: Part of Alden August Supporting Cast: Lotlot de Leon, Mon Confiado, Denise Barbacena, Roxie Smith, Victor Anastacio, Rolando Inocencio
| 32 | "The Lost Boy" | Alden Richards | Irene Emma Villamor | Karen Lustica | August 19, 2023 |
Allan will go to any length to provide for and save his family's life, and this will lead him to join a group of a syndicate. Note: Part of Alden August Supporting Cast: Ryan Eigenmann, Lovely Rivero, Simon Ibarra, Shaira Diaz, Luke Conde, Marx Topacio
| 33 | "Sa Puso't Isipan" (The Cartillana Family Story) | Alden Richards | Gina Alajar | Benson Logronio | August 26, 2023 |
Andrew grew up in a happy family, but this fairytale-like family suddenly fell apart because of his parents' mental illness. How will he be able to handle it? Note: Part of Alden August Supporting Cast: Jackie Lou Blanco, Cris Villanueva, Therese Malvar, Dave Bornea
| 34 | "Nanay Kontesera" | Pokwang | Rechie del Carmen | Benson Logronio | September 2, 2023 |
Note: Replay story on July 10, 2021. Supporting Cast: Boom Labrusca, Tart Carlos, Ayra Mariano, Gold Aceron
| 35 | "Voice of Love" (The Lani and Noli Misalucha Story) | Glaiza de Castro, Juancho Trivino | Neal del Rosario | Vienuel Ello | September 9, 2023 |
Lani Misalucha is well-known for her title as 'Asia's Nightingale' because of her singing prowess, but behind her success as a singer lies the struggles in her life with her husband, Noli. Supporting Cast: Janina Lorelei, Aaron Hewson
| 36 | "Ang Batang Hamog" (The Boy Zobel Story) | Rocco Nacino, Shamaine Buencamino | Rado Peru | Loi Argel Nova | September 16, 2023 |
This story of a homeless child who was transformed by the love of a nurturing mother. Supporting Cast: Jenzel Angeles, Angelo Teves, Kaycee Manaig
| 37 | "Ina Ka ng Anak Mo" | Rita Avila, Lito Pimentel | Jules Katanyag | Gina Marissa Tagasa | September 23, 2023 |
Supporting Cast: Sophie Albert, Joyce Ching, Haley Dizon, Ella Cristofani, Vince Crisostomo, Euwenn Aleta
| 38 | "My Mother & I" (The Abdul Raman Story) | Abdul Raman | Adolf Alix Jr. | Benson Logronio | September 30, 2023 |
Supporting Cast: Glydel Mercado, Travis Clarino, Clara del Rosario
| 39 | "A Song for Daddy" (The Anthony Rosaldo Story) | Ken Chan | Neal del Rosario | Benson Logronio | October 14, 2023 |
Anthony Rosaldo experiences different struggles in life, but because of the courage of the people he loves, he learns to fight for his dreams. Supporting Cast: Jestoni Alarcon, Glenda Garcia, Jay Arcilla
| 40 | "Pinaslang ng Tikbalang" | Kristoffer Martin | Jules Katanyag | John Roque | October 21, 2023 |
Supporting Cast: Nonie Buencamino, Yayo Aguila, Kim de Leon, Ashley Rivera
| 41 | "Ang Batang Biktima ng Sanib" | Jillian Ward | L.A. Madridejos | Vienuel Ello | October 28, 2023 |
Julia is a kind and loving daughter. However, she has been a victim of demonic possession. Note: Replay story on July 7, 2018. Supporting Cast: Mickey Ferriols, Epy Quizon, Leanne Bautista
| 42 | "Champion na Tatay" (The Marvin Peralta Story) | Martin del Rosario, Liezel Lopez | Mark Sicat Dela Cruz | Vienuel Ello | November 4, 2023 |
Watch what Marvin Peralta went through as a husband and a father before he achieved his dream success. Supporting Cast: Lucho Ayala, Mitzi Josh
| 43 | "Save My Children" (The Quirly Galache Story) | Katrina Halili, Gabby Eigenmann | Adolf Alix Jr. | Karen Lustica | November 11, 2023 |
Supporting Cast: Sue Prado, Tanya Gomez, Juharra Asayo, Sean John Bialoglovski, Marinelle Dayego
| 44 | "Huwag Kang Susuko" (The Leny Garcia Story) | Gina Alajar | Jorron Lee Monroy | John Roque | November 18, 2023 |
Leny is a selfless mother who is willing to stand up to get justice for her children who have been accused of false allegations. Note: Replay story on November 12, 2022. Supporting Cast: Dave Bornea, Kim De Leon, Joaquin Domagoso, William Lorenzo, Ella Cristofani, Shanicka Arganda
| 45 | "Mister na Walang Misis" | Benjamin Alves | Jules Katanyag | Gina Marissa Tagasa | November 25, 2023 |
What will you do if, one day, your wife abandons you and your children? Can you be both a pillar and a light in your home? Supporting Cast: Max Eigenmann, Juan Rodrigo, Dani Ozaraga, Brianna Advincula, Kenji San Pablo
| 46 | "I am Beautiful" (The Kiray Celis Story) | Kiray Celis | Rado Peru | Vienuel Ello | December 2, 2023 |
Kiray Celis is known as a former child star and is now making her name in the show business with her comedy wit. Despite her happy disposition, what are the painful trials has gone through in life? Supporting Cast: Tina Paner, Smokey Manaloto, Manolo Pedrosa, Radson Flores, Anjo Damiles, Clarence Delgado
| 47 | "I am Not My Mother" | Amy Austria, Ashley Ortega, Neil Ryan Sese | Jules Katanyag | Gina Marissa Tagasa | December 9, 2023 |
Supporting Cast: Crystal Paras, Lui Manansala, Kaycee Manaig, Clara del Rosario
| 48 | "Bingit ng Buhay" | Mikee Quintos | Jules Katanyag | Gina Marissa Tagasa | December 16, 2023 |
Vicky is an aspiring teacher, but an unfortunate thing happened to her life as she became involved in an accident and suffered comatose when she had to take the board exam. Supporting Cast: Carmi Martin, Lito Pimentel, Vaness del Moral, Luke Conde
| 49 | "LGBT: Love Goals, Bakla, Tomboy" | Boobay, Vaness del Moral | Mark A. Reyes | Vienuel Ello | December 23, 2023 |
Jericho is gay, while Kat is a lesbian, and life will put them to the test as a unique LGBTQIA+ couple. Note: Replay story on June 25, 2022. Supporting Cast: Leo Martinez, Malou de Guzman, Brent Valdez, Crystal Paras, Krissy Achino, Gigi Locsin
| 50 | "My Kidney Belongs To You" (The Philip Maala and Irish Maniwang Love Story) | Sanya Lopez, Rocco Nacino | Mark A. Reyes | John Roque | December 30, 2023 |
The thrilling love story of two high school classmates, Irish and Philip, who must put their love to the test in the face of adversity. Note: Replay story on August 27, 2022. Supporting Cast: Allen Dizon, Angela Alarcon, Dolly de Leon

=== 2024 ===
| No. | Title | Cast | Directed by | Written by | Original release date |
|---|---|---|---|---|---|
| 1 | "Sana Muling Makapiling" | Glydel Mercado, Cassy Legaspi, Joyce Ching | Gina Alajar | Gina Marissa Tagasa | January 6, 2024 |
Erlin is a mother who is forced to sell her child due to financial constraints. Will her child accept her if they meet again? Note: Replay story on January 7, 2023. Supporting Cast: Raquel Pareño, Prince Clemente
| 2 | "Always in My Mind" (The Kath Basa Story) | Bea Alonzo | Richard Arellano | Karen Lustica | January 13, 2024 |
What would you do if you found yourself in a position where your sanity is called into question? Watch the story of two siblings who went through a tragedy and developed a mental condition. Supporting Cast: Shamaine Buencamino, Adrian Alandy, Angel Guardian, Kiel Rodriguez, Jong Cuenco
| 3 | "For Better or For Worse" (The Abdullah and Maha Dawood Love Story) | Max Collins, Mike Agassi | Neal del Rosario | Loi Argel Nova | January 20, 2024 |
In a relationship, simple misunderstandings can lead to falling apart. Watch the story of Maha and Abdullah and how they mended and fought for their love. Supporting Cast: Jennie Gabriel, Raquel Pareño, Luis Hontiveros
| 4 | "The Blind Pianist" (The Luis Abad Story) | Jeric Gonzales | Jules Katanyag | John Roque | January 27, 2024 |
Watch the heartwarming story of Luis, a blind pianist who faced tremendous obstacles in both his family and romantic relationship. Supporting Cast: Eula Valdez, Sharmaine Arnaiz, Leandro Baldemor, Analyn Barro, Jay Arcilla
| 5 | "What Matters Most" (The Drei Cruzet and Randell Echon Story) | Kristoffer Martin, Dave Bornea | Mark Dela Cruz | Benson Logronio | February 3, 2024 |
A lot of us are going through challenges in our lives, such as anxiety and depression due to family problems, peer pressure, sexual identity, and other influences. Watch Drei's and Randel's story as fate confronts them with life's challenges. Supporting Cast: Isay Alvarez, Sharmaine Suarez, Mike Lloren, Elan Villafuerte
| 6 | "The Rejected Son" (The Darwin Chong Story) | Edgar Allan Guzman | Neal del Rosario | Loi Argel Nova | February 10, 2024 |
What will you do if the love you deserve keeps walking away from you? Watch Darwin's life, whose only desire is his father's love and acceptance no matter what path he takes. Supporting Cast: Ricky Davao, Lovely Rivero, Angela Alarcon, Migs Villasis, Carlo San Juan
| 7 | "Asawa Na, Nanay Pa" (The Judy and Erick Roque Love Story) | Carmi Martin, Yasser Marta | Mark Dela Cruz | Gina Marissa Tagasa | February 17, 2024 |
'Love knows no age' and the unique love story of Erick and Judy is proof that age does not matter when it comes to love. Their age difference doesn't prevent them from maintaining their romantic relationship. Supporting Cast: Ces Quesada, Faye Lorenzo, Christian Antolin
| 8 | "Every Breath You Take" (The Andrew Schimmer and Jorhomy "Jho" Rovero Story) | Mark Herras, Arra San Agustin | Mark Dela Cruz | Benson Logronio | February 24, 2024 |
Former matinee idol Andrew Schimmer met Jho, a college student that time. Despite numerous rejections and disagreement from her family, Jho decided to give Andrew a chance and started a family. However, in November 2021, Jho suffered a cardiac arrest and remained comatose. Because he has no acting stints due to the COVID-19 pandemic, Andrew used the internet to seek help because of the increasing hospital bills, proving his unconditional love to Jho. Note: Replay story on August 6, 2022. Supporting Cast: Sherilyn Reyes-Tan, Dayara Shane, Marlon Mance, Clara del Rosario
| 9 | "Second Chance sa Forever" | Katrina Halili, Mike Tan, Pancho Magno | Jules Katanyag | Benson Logronio | March 2, 2024 |
If your relationship keeps on hurting you, can you still endure the constant pain caused by it? Watch the life story of Sally, who discovers a new love. Supporting Cast: Gilleth Sandico, Lime Aranya
| 10 | "Ang Ina Kong Ahas" | Sheryl Cruz, Ashley Ortega | Neal del Rosario | Vien Ello | March 9, 2024 |
What would you do if your husband betrayed you for your mother? Can you handle it? Check out the story of Maila, who was duped by her husband for her mother. Supporting Cast: Martin del Rosario, Lady Gagita
| 11 | "A Mother To Remember" (The Bryan Benedict Story) | Tom Rodriguez | Mark Sicat dela Cruz | Gina Marissa Tagasa | March 16, 2024 |
As a child, what are you willing to do for your parents? Supporting Cast: Elizabeth Oropesa, Rolando Inocencio, Via Veloso, Chanel Latorre, Aidan Veneracion
| 12 | "Freedom To Love" (The Loyda and Honnie Love Story) | Donita Nose, Joem Bascon | Adolfo Alix Jr. | John Roque | March 23, 2024 |
The love between opposite genders can be freely expressed without public judgment, but how about the people who are part of a same-sex relationship? Supporting Cast: Ina Feleo, Froilan Manto
| 13 | "Hubad na Anak" | Royce Cabrera | Neal del Rosario | Loi Argel Nova | April 6, 2024 |
What can a son sacrifice for his parents? Supporting Cast: Jean Saburit, Prince Clemente, Kimson Tan, Kirst Viray, Angel Leighton
| 14 | "Taylor Made Success" (The John Mac Lane Coronel Story) | Boobay | Neal del Rosario | Vien Ello | April 13, 2024 |
John Mac Coronel, also known as Taylor Sheesh, is a famous Filipina Drag Queen who impersonates her biggest idol, Taylor Swift. But behind her successful career and the glitz and glamour of the stage, Mac continues to endure and fight different life problems. Supporting Cast: Pinky Amador, Michael de Mesa, Luis Hontiveros
| 15 | "Abused and Raped" | Rabiya Mateo | Richard Arellano | Karen Lustica | April 20, 2024 |
A lot of news about the Overseas Filipino Workers (OFW) who have been abused, imprisoned, or killed circulated on the internet and in the media. Watch the horrible life story of Mariel, a wife, mother, and OFW who has lived a life of torment her entire life. Supporting Cast: Richard Quan, Maureen Larrazabal, Jon Lucas
| 16 | "Daughter's Dollhouse" (The Faye Lorenzo Story) | Faye Lorenzo | Adolfo Alix Jr. | Loi Argel Nova | April 27, 2024 |
Faye Lorenzo is a rookie comedian who builds her name in the showbiz industry, in particular with comedy series, but behind her laughter hides a dramatic past in her life. Watch the life story of Faye Lorenzo and how she conquers all the challenges in her life for her family. Note: Replay story on May 27, 2023. Supporting Cast: Gary Estrada, Bernadette Allyson, Zonia Mejia, Gigi Locsin, Vince Crisostomo
| 17 | "Huwag, Bayaw!" | Rocco Nacino | Don Michael Perez | Vienuel Ello | May 4, 2024 |
What would you do if you accidentally fell in love with your husband's sister? Supporting Cast: Mike Tan, Max Collins, Jeniffer Maravilla
| 18 | "A Mother's Wish" (The Mica Tubino Story) | Kate Valdez | Neal del Rosario | Gina Marissa Tagasa | May 11, 2024 |
How can you take care of your beloved mother, who is about to leave this world? Check out the touching story of Jovi's life and how he made the most of the time he had with his beloved family. Supporting Cast: Sherilyn Reyes, Cris Villanueva, Kim de Leon, Patricia Coma
| 19 | "Ang Banta ng Duwende" | Althea Ablan | Mark A. Reyes | Loi Nova | May 18, 2024 |
Do you believe in little creatures called elves? What would you do if you were liked by this kind of creature? Supporting Cast: Lovely Rivero, John Feir, Abdul Raman, Ashley Sarmiento, Charlie Fleming, Jade Tecson, Fredmoore de los Santos
| 20 | "Babalikan o Papalitan" | Bianca Manalo | Don Michael Perez | Benson Logronio | May 25, 2024 |
Moving on from someone you love who eventually leaves you without a trace or explanation is a hard thing to deal with, but how did Rochelle recover from this heartbreak when her husband suddenly disappeared? Supporting Cast: Jason Abalos, Rob Gomez, Radson Flores, Sienna Stevens, Stanley Abuloc
| 21 | "Don't Kill Your Baby" (The Yesha Velasco Story) | Vanessa Peña, Joaquin Domagoso | Gina Alajar | Gina Marissa Gil | June 1, 2024 |
As a woman stepping into motherhood, how can you fully embrace your responsibilities? Supporting Cast: Rita Avila, Leandro Baldemor
| 22 | "The 19-Day Bride" (The Gemma Villamar Story) | Elle Villanueva, Derrick Monasterio | Jules Katanyag | Karen Lustica | June 8, 2024 |
As the saying goes, life is short. What will you do if one day you wake up and the love of your life is not by your side anymore? Supporting Cast: Jayson Gainza, Gilleth Sandico, Denise Barbacena, Jennie Gabriel
| 23 | "Papa's Boy" (The Arnulfo and Alfritz Blanche Story) | Ricky Davao | Don Michael Perez | Benson Logronio | June 15, 2024 |
Accepting one's gender identity might be hard for other people, especially if they are part of your family. Watch the story of Alfritz Blanche and his relationship with his loving father. Supporting Cast: Isay Alvarez, Matt Lozano
| 24 | "Inang Walang Pamilya" | Ai-Ai Delas Alas | Gina Alajar | Gina Marissa Tagasa | June 22, 2024 |
They say that parents can't endure their children, but can a child tolerate their parents? Watch the life story of Rose about her broken relationship with her kids and how they reconcile with each other. Note: Replay story on July 29, 2023. Supporting Cast: Neil Ryan Sese, Joyce Ching, Jay Arcilla, Julia Pascual, Via Veloso, Ian Ignacio, Lee Loyola
| 25 | "Ang Pambansang Yobab" | Euleen Castro | Mark Dela Cruz | Jessie Villabrille | June 29, 2024 |
What were the obstacles that Euleen Castro conquered due to her weight? How did she get the courage to stand up for herself? Supporting Cast: Shamaine Buencamino, Angela Alarcon, Gil Cuerva, Pepita Curtis, Marco Masa
| 26 | "Hostage in Israel" (The Jimmy Pacheco Story) | Martin del Rosario, Liezel Lopez | Mark A. Reyes | John Roque | July 6, 2024 |
The entire world was shocked when Israel was bombed and a war broke out. Watch the story of a Filipino who was held captive by an armed group. Supporting Cast: Al Tantay, Tina Paner, Mike Agassi, Thia Thomalla
| 27 | "Inaanak, Inanakan" | Gladys Reyes | Neal del Rosario | Karen Lustica | July 13, 2024 |
What will you do if your womanizer husband grows dissatisfied with you and begins pursuing your goddaughter? Supporting Cast: Christian Vasquez, Tanya Gomez, Cheska Fausto, Shayne Sava
| 28 | "A Scandalous Crime" | Ashley Ortega, Lucho Ayala, Vaness del Moral | Adolf Alix Jr. | John Roque | July 20, 2024 |
Rina, a happy-go-lucky teenager would fall into the hands of Dennis. He abducts Rina and took her away. It was through his mastery of hypnosis, Rina had no choice but to follow whatever Dennis wants her to do, even if it means giving her own body to him. Note: Replay story on March 21, 2020. Supporting Cast: Leandro Baldemor, Lovely Rivero, Elle Villanueva, Zonia Mejia, Anthony Rosaldo
| 29 | "Reyna ng Bubog" | Katrina Halili | Don Michael Perez | Gina Marissa Tagasa | July 27, 2024 |
How do you survive all the misfortunes and obstacles in your life? Supporting Cast: Lito Pimentel, Adrian Alandy, Mark Dionisio, Janna Trias, John Clifford
| 30 | "A Son's Karma" (The Wilbert Tolentino Story) | Paolo Contis | Richard Arellano | Benson Logronio | August 3, 2024 |
He is known in the world of showbiz as a vlogger, businessman, and former talent manager. But despite his colorful life, the blows he is going through are still not gone. Check out Wilbert Tolentino's story. Supporting Cast: Anna Marin, William Lorenzo, Ashley Rivera, Aidan Veneracion, Lotlot Bustamante
| 31 | "BF Ko Ang Tatay ng BFF Ko" | Gabby Eigenmann, Arra San Agustin, Lexi Gonzales | Mark Dela Cruz | Vienuel Ello | August 10, 2024 |
Friendship heavily relies on trust as our friends are also our family, not only during fun times but also during dark times, but what will you do if your best friend is having an affair with your father? Will you accept their relationship? Supporting Cast: Via Veloso, Jin Macapagal, Liana Mae
| 32 | "Liwanag Ng Bituin" (The Estrella "Star" Besabe Story) | Pokwang | Monti Parungao | Vienuel Ello | August 17, 2024 |
Star keep a secret from her three children that she and her husband are divorced. When her children find out about this, her relationship with them becomes strained. Note: Replay story on January 29, 2022. Supporting Cast: Jon Lucas, Royce Cabrera, Dave Bornea, Skelly Skelly
| 33 | "Kung Mawawala Ka" | Andrea Torres, Miguel Tanfelix | Neal del Rosario | Loi Argel Nova | August 24, 2024 |
At what age can you say that what you feel for someone is true love? Supporting Cast: Michael Flores, Jeniffer Maravilla
| 34 | "Tatlo Ang Tatay Ko" (The Christine Lara Mercado Story) | Cassy Legaspi | Richard Arellano | Gina Marissa Tagasa | August 31, 2024 |
Most of us would've had a pair of parents growing up, but Kristine is exceptional because she grew up with not only one or two fathers but three. Supporting Cast: Dominic Ochoa, Bobby Andrews, Epy Quizon, Sharmaine Arnaiz
| 35 | "Alipin ng Amain" | Althea Ablan, Neil Ryan Sese | Neal del Rosario | John Roque | September 7, 2024 |
Not everyone is fortunate to have parents, what if the ones you trusted to uplift you ends up being the people who breaks you. Watch the story of Analuz and the hell she went through at the hands of her father. Supporting Cast: Maricar de Mesa, Alma Concepcion, Vince Crisostomo, Seb Pajarillo
| 36 | "Ang Hiling sa Diyos" (The Vance Uy-Cuaki Story) | Rhian Ramos | Neal del Rosario | Gina Marissa Tagasa | September 14, 2024 |
What would you do if your mother left you one day? Are you willing to forgive her? Note: Replay story on July 1, 2023. Supporting Cast: Marina Benipayo, Gilleth Sandico, Jong Cuenco, Cassy Lavarias
| 37 | "Haunted House For Rent" | Rochelle Pangilinan | Mark A. Reyes | Benson Logronio | September 21, 2024 |
What if the house you rented had someone who wasn't human but a ghost? Supporting Cast: Vaness del Moral, Marco Masa, Mel Kimura
| 38 | "Asawa Noon, Kabit Ngayon" | Rabiya Mateo | Don Michael Perez | John Roque | September 28, 2024 |
What if the person you believed would be your life partner ended up marrying someone else just 12 days after marrying you? Supporting Cast: Rafael Rosell, Faye Lorenzo, Ericca Laude
| 39 | "Ang Nanay Kong Adik" | Ysabel Ortega | Neal del Rosario | Karen Lustica | October 5, 2024 |
It is the role of the parents to provide for the family, but what would you do as a child if you were given such a heavy responsibility? Supporting Cast: Sherilyn Reyes, Richard Quan, Elijah Alejo, Prince Clemente
| 40 | "Love Times Three" (The Joel and April Regal Love Story) | Max Collins, Edgar Allan Guzman | Jojo Nadela | John Roque | October 12, 2024 |
What would you do if one of the most important people in your life is taken from you one day? Note: Replay story on February 4, 2023. Supporting Cast: Yayo Aguila
| 41 | "Sugat Na Hindi Naghihilom" (The Andrea Coleen Velasco Story) | Ashley Ortega | Don Michael Perez | Loi Argel Nova | October 19, 2024 |
What would you do if you were diagnosed with a rare illness? Will you fight or lose hope? Supporting Cast: Arlene Muhlach, Luis Hontiveros, Kim Perez, Ella Cristofani, Angel Leighton, Emil Sandoval
| 42 | "Crazy In Love" (The Irene Franca Story) | Lianne Valentin, Derrick Monasterio | Mark A. Reyes | Vienuel Ello | October 26, 2024 |
Is it really true that hearts are meant to be broken? How far would you go for love? Supporting Cast: Almira Muhlach, Jean Saburit, Shuvee Etrata
| 43 | "The Haunted Soul" | Bea Alonzo | Jerry Lopez Sineneng | Jessie Villabrille | November 2, 2024 |
Because of her sufferings, Lezlie has lost faith in God, prompting her to attract strange elements that normal people cannot perceive. Note: Replay story on December 10, 2022. Supporting Cast: Bing Pimentel, Marco Alcaraz, Marnie Lapus, Josh Ivan Morales
| 44 | "Wanted: Sperm Donor" | Rhian Ramos, Michelle Dee | Don Michael Perez | Loi Argel Nova | November 9, 2024 |
They say that becoming a mother is one of the most fulfilling experiences for a woman, but what if you are in a relationship with a woman? What will you do to achieve your dream? Supporting Cast: Tanya Gomez, Bryan Benedict, AZ Martinez
| 45 | "Abandonadang Ina" | Rita Daniela, Mark Herras | Neal Del Rosario, Don Michael Perez | Karen Lustica | November 16, 2024 |
Do you feel like you never run out of problems? What if you fall in love with the wrong person over and over again? Supporting Cast: Gilleth Sandico
| 46 | "Footless and Fearless" (The Diego Garcia Story) | Miguel Tanfelix | Neal del Rosario | John Roque | November 23, 2024 |
Born without legs, Diego becomes recognized when his TikTok videos gain more views. Note: Replay story on January 15, 2022. Supporting Cast: Sharmaine Arnaiz, Paul Salas, Mike Lloren, Sophia Senoron, Saviour Ramos
| 47 | "My Very Special Son" (The Candy Pangilinan Story) | Candy Pangilinan | Mark A. Reyes | Gina Marissa Tagasa | November 30, 2024 |
Candy Pangilinan is a well-known actress and comedian, but behind the scenes she takes on the role of an excellent mother. Watch the story of her life with her son named Quentin who was diagnosed with autism and ADHD. Note: Part of their 22nd anniversary presentation Supporting Cast: Sandy Andolong, Shyr Valdez, Will Ashley, Euwenn Mikaell
| 48 | "My Nanay Rider" (The Ma. Theresa Mayuga Story) | Ai-Ai Delas Alas | Mark A. Reyes | John Roque | December 7, 2024 |
As a mother, you would do anything for your family, even ride a motorcycle to make a living? Watch Tere's life with an extraordinary job. Note: Part of their 22nd anniversary presentation Supporting Cast: Leandro Baldemor, Kelvin Miranda, Lui Manansala
| 49 | "Adventures Of Nanay Rider" (The Ma. Theresa Mayuna Story) | Ai-Ai Delas Alas | Mark A. Reyes | John Roque | December 14, 2024 |
As Tere's life story continues, how will she deal with the new problems that will come her way? Let's embark on the journey of Tere's life. Note: Part of their 22nd anniversary presentation Supporting Cast: Leandro Baldemor, Kelvin Miranda, Lui Manansala
| 50 | "A Christmas Miracle" (The Madrid Family Story) | Mylene Dizon | Don Michael Perez | John Roque | December 21, 2024 |
Note: Replay story on December 24, 2022. Supporting Cast: Gabby Eigenmann, Marco Masa
| 51 | "Luha sa Likod ng Tawa" (The Buboy Villar Story) | Buboy Villar | Jules Katanyag | Loi Argel Nova | December 28, 2024 |
Buboy Villar started his entertainment journey as a child star. Later on, he became part of the cast in some of GMA's most popular shows. Watch the life story of Buboy Villar and what he went through before achieving fame. Note: Replay story on June 3, 2023. Supporting Cast: Smokey Manaloto, Tina Paner, Ervic Vijandre, TG Daylusan, Dani Porter, JM San Jose, Arkin Torres

=== 2025 ===
| No. | Title | Cast | Directed by | Written by | Original release date |
|---|---|---|---|---|---|
| 1 | "Sa Puso't Isipan" (The Cartillana Family Story) | Alden Richards | Gina Alajar | Benson Logronio | January 4, 2025 |
Andrew grew up in a happy family, but this fairytale-like family suddenly fell apart because of his parents' mental illness. How will he be able to handle it? Note: Replay story on August 26, 2023. Supporting Cast: Jackie Lou Blanco, Cris Villanueva, Therese Malvar, Dave Bornea
| 2 | "Viral Guy Guard" (The Gerald Concan Story) | Jay Ortega | Don Michael Perez | Vienuel Ello | January 11, 2025 |
Guards are commended for their bravery and strength, but what happens if a young gay guy hides his identity and works as a guard? Supporting Cast: Dexter Doria, Levi Ignacio, Lovely Rivero, Stephanie Sol, Migs Villasis, Omar Flores, Robbie Packing
| 3 | "Malas na Misis" | Pokwang | Neal del Rosario | Tina Samson-Velasco | January 18, 2025 |
Do you believe in curses or prophecies? That's what Aileen believes after several tragedies have struck her life. Supporting Cast: Allen Dizon, Michael Flores, Simon Ibarra, Arnold Reyes, Patricia Tumulak, Mia Pangyarihan, Tonio Quiazon, Chanel Latorre, Aya Domingo
| 4 | "Higanti ng Anak" | Rochelle Pangilinan | Neal del Rosario | Loi Argel Nova | January 25, 2025 |
Are you willing to avenge the people you love, or would you rather forgive? Supporting Cast: Al Tantay, Elizabeth Oropesa, Archie Adamos, Rob Sy, Zyren dela Cruz, Mitzi Josh, Dax Alejandro
| 5 | "Unbreakable" (The Charm and John Rey Love Story) | Meryll Soriano, Joem Bascon | Mark A. Reyes | Jessie Villabrille | February 8, 2025 |
Do you believe in second chances? Are you ready to forgive the person you once loved? Supporting Cast: Melissa Mendez, Geleen Eugenio, Rolando Inocencio, Aidan Veneracion, Patrick Armstrong, Ara Altamira, Benedict Lao
| 6 | "Ang Inang Iniwan" | Janice de Belen | Don Michael Perez | Karen Lustica | February 15, 2025 |
What would you do if you lost your child to a stupid teenage love? Supporting Cast: Gio Alvarez, Bryce Eusebio, Angela Alarcon, Raquel Pareño, Charlie Fleming
| 7 | "Tall & Small" | Jo Berry, Mike Tan | Adolf Alix Jr. | Tina Samson-Velasco | February 22, 2025 |
If love can exist between the rich and the poor, old and young people, and those of the same sex, this feature story is about a tall man and a beautiful, small woman falling in love. Supporting Cast: Amy Austria, Kim Perez, Evelyn Santos
| 8 | "Ang Ikatlong Mata" | Royce Cabrera | Mark A. Reyes | John Roque | March 1, 2025 |
If you have a third eye, would you consider it a blessing from God or a curse from evil? Supporting Cast: Smokey Manaloto, Tina Paner, Maricar de Mesa, Liezel Lopez, Lorenz Martinez
| 9 | "The 19-Day Bride" (The Gemma Villamar Story) | Elle Villanueva, Derrick Monasterio | Jules Katanyag | Karen Lustica | March 8, 2025 |
As the saying goes, life is short. What will you do if one day you wake up and the love of your life is not by your side anymore? Note: Replay story on June 8, 2024. Supporting Cast: Jayson Gainza, Gilleth Sandico, Denise Barbacena, Jennie Gabriel
| 10 | "From Hooker to Housekeeper" | Kylie Padilla | Neal del Rosario | John Roque | March 15, 2025 |
We all face tough trials in life that will test our mental strength and integrity. Watch the life story of Mabel, who went through a difficult experience from the age of six until she became an adult. Supporting Cast: Sharmaine Arnaiz, Mon Confiado, Sugar Mercado
| 11 | "Anak, Kapalit ng Droga" | Rita Avila | Don Michael Perez | Loi Argel Nova | March 22, 2025 |
How painful is it for a child to learn that he is only an adopted child? Supporting Cast: Epy Quizon, Sherilyn Reyes, Cheska Fausto, Marco Masa, Chanel Lattore
| 12 | "The Woman That Got Away" (The Rafael "Paeng" Palma Story) | Vina Morales, Gary Estrada | Mark Dela Cruz | Stanley Bryce Pabilona | March 29, 2025 |
Have you ever had missed chances or opportunities in your love life? Watch the story of Paeng, a man who couldn't stay with Beth, the woman he loved the most Supporting Cast: Chuckie Dreyfus, Arny Ross
| 13 | "Forgive Me, Father" (The Ruslan Kulikov Story) | Bruce Roeland, Gina Alajar, Gabby Eigenmann | Dominic Zapata | Karen Lustica | April 5, 2025 |
What would you do if your father is suffering from a mental disorder? Watch the life story of Ruslan and his father Philip, who has a condition called schizophrenia. Supporting Cast: Andrea del Rosario, Analyn Barro, Jo-Ann Morallos
| 14 | "The Healer Wife" | Bea Alonzo | Zig Dulay | Gina Marissa Tagasa | April 12, 2025 |
Do you believe in faith healing? This is the life of a woman who had the ability to heal the illnesses of others but not her own family's. How long will her faith last? Supporting Cast: Tom Rodriguez, Max Eigenmann, Euwenn Mikaell
| 15 | "Child Bride: Bata, Bata, Paano Ka Kinasal?" | Ashley Sarmiento | Gil Tejada Jr. | John Roque | April 26, 2025 |
Supporting Cast: Romnick Sarmenta, Maureen Larrazabal, William Lorenzo, Mel Kimura, Aidan Veneracion
| 16 | "Sa Tamang Panahon" (The Alex Calleja Story) | Sef Cadayona | Adolf Alix Jr. | Gina Marissa Tagasa | May 3, 2025 |
Supporting Cast: Snooky Serna, Pinky Amador, Richard Quan, Faye Lorenzo, Jennie Gabriel, Enzo Osorio, Allan Villafuerte
| 17 | "Ang Inang Walang Puso" | Shamaine Buencamino | Neal del Rosario | Loi Argel Nova | May 10, 2025 |
After the death of her husband, Gloria would harshly discipline her children, especially her granddaughter. But, her children would already give up and leave her. What they didn't know, is that Gloria's memory is now slowly fading due to Alzheimer's Disease. Will they learn to forgive their heartless mother before she no longer remembers anything? Supporting Cast: Ina Feleo, Nonie Buencamino, Vaness del Moral, Althea Ablan, Mikoy Morales, Aya Domingo
| 18 | "3 Sisters, 1 Lover" | Kelvin Miranda, Arra San Agustin, Thea Tolentino, Liezel Lopez | Mark A. Reyes | Vienuel Ello | May 17, 2025 |
Supporting Cast: Leandro Baldemor, Jalyn Perez
| 19 | "Takas ng Mag-ina" | Cris Villanueva, Diana Zubiri | Don Michael Perez | Karen Lustica | May 24, 2025 |
Supporting Cast: Kim de Leon, Caprice Cayetano, Tonio Quiazon, Tanya Gomez, Mark Manicad
| 20 | "Asawa at Kabit sa Isang Bubong" | Martin del Rosario | Rechie del Carmen | Loi Argel Nova | May 31, 2025 |
Note: Replay story on July 17, 2021. Supporting Cast: Katrina Halili, Kris Bernal, Ollie Espino
| 21 | "Ang Lalaking Marupok" | Mike Tan, Rabiya Mateo | Neal del Rosario | Vienuel Ello | June 7, 2025 |
Supporting Cast: Isay Alvarez, Angela Alarcon, Lexi Gonzales, Roxie Smith, Luke Conde
| 22 | "Paano Ba Maging Isang Ama?" | Royce Cabrera | Neal del Rosario | John Roque | June 14, 2025 |
Supporting Cast: Neil Ryan Sese, Sherilyn Reyes, Vanessa Peña, Brent Valdez, Zonia Mejia, Angel Leighton
| 23 | "Mag-asawa, Ginayuma!" | Derrick Monasterio, Kristofer Martin | Neal del Rosario | Vienuel Ello | June 21, 2025 |
Elmer and Dessa experience weird things in their relationship as they meet Raul. The latter plans a scheme to make the two couple fall in love with him. Note: Replay story on April 29, 2023. Supporting Cast: Elle Villanueva, Anna Marin
| 24 | "The Rejected Mother" | Ashley Ortega, Amy Austria, Mon Confiado | Neal del Rosario | Gina Marissa Tagasa | June 28, 2025 |
What would you do if your daughter did not formally invite you to her wedding day? Would you simply let her be happy without you at her side? Supporting Cast: Madeleine Nicolas, Princess Aliyah, Jin Macapagal
| 25 | "Body for Sale" (The Nelson Alapriz Story) | Bruce Roeland, Pancho Magno | Adolf Alix, Jr. | John Roque | July 5, 2025 |
Because of poverty, it is inevitable that you will do things against your will. Watch the life story of Nelson, who used to sell his body and now works as a middleman between a prostitute and a customer. Supporting Cast: Rita Avila, Shyr Valdez, Prince Clemente, Ashley Rivera, Pepita Curtis, Rosemarie Sarita, Michael Dagdag, Raul Russo
| 26 | "I Love You, Tita" | Jean Garcia, Rafael Rosell | Gil Tejada, Jr. | Jessie Villabrille | July 19, 2025 |
Supporting Cast: Mia Pangyarihan, Shermaine Santiago
| 27 | "Double Murder sa Pamilya" (The Dindo Sumibcay Story) | Kokoy de Santos | Richard Arellano | John Roque | July 26, 2025 |
Supporting Cast: Valerie Concepcion, Elizabeth Oropesa, Michael Flores, Boom Labrusca, Zyren dela Cruz, Kim Perez
| 28 | "My Missing Daughter" (The Antonio Cordeta Story) | Edgar Allan Guzman | Jules Kantanyag | John Roque | August 2, 2025 |
Note: Replay story on June 17, 2023. Supporting Cast: Liezel Lopez, Malou de Guzman, Ashley Sarmiento, Joshua Bulot
| 29 | "Pinoy Big Breadwinner" (The Shuvee Etrata Story) | Shuvee Etrata | Neal del Rosario | John Roque | August 9, 2025 |
Supporting Cast: Sharmaine Arnaiz, Christian Antolin, Migz Diokno, Gabby Eigenmann
| 30 | "Abused Child, Unfaithful Wife" | Winwyn Marquez | Don Michael Perez | Gina Marissa Tagasa | August 16, 2025 |
Supporting Cast: Epy Quizon, Adrian Alandy, Jon Lucas, Lovely Rivero, Aya Domingo
| 31 | "Karibal Noon, Beshie Ngayon" | Rochelle Pangilinan | Neal del Rosario | Karen Lustica | August 23, 2025 |
Supporting Cast: Dion Ignacio, Tanya Ramos, Katrina Halili
| 32 | "Bayad Utang" | Therese Malvar | Neal del Rosario | Gina Marissa Tagasa | August 30, 2025 |
Note: Replay story on February 25, 2023. Supporting Cast: Dennis Padilla, Larkin Castor, Jaclyn Jose, Juharra Asayo, Kian Co, Omar Flores
| 33 | "Macho Papa Dancer" | Martin del Rosario | Neal del Rosario | Loi Argel Nova | September 6, 2025 |
Supporting Cast: Alma Concepcion, Beverly Salviejo, Dave Bornea, Angela Alarcon, Marx Topacio, Betong Sumaya
| 34 | "Ang Babaeng 'Di Na Natuto" (The Stephanie Parker Story) | Kris Bernal | Jorron Lee Monroy | Tina Samson Velasco | September 13, 2025 |
Supporting Cast: Snooky Serna, Bernard Palanca, Johnny Revilla, Jeff Moses, Nikki Co
| 35 | "Ang Anak Kong Pornstar" | Amy Austria, Rabiya Mateo | Mark Sicat Dela Cruz | Vienuel Ello | September 20, 2025 |
Supporting Cast: Pancho Magno, Carlo Gonzales
| 36 | "A Runner to Remember" (The Jirome De Castro Story) | Alden Richards | Neal del Rosario | Loi Argel Nova | September 27, 2025 |
Note: Replay story on August 5, 2023. Supporting Cast: Sanya Lopez, Gio Alvarez, Jeffrey Tam, Brent Valdez
| 37 | "Ang Mag-Asawang Taksil" | Liezel Lopez, Jason Abalos | Neal del Rosario | Gina Marissa Tagasa | October 4, 2025 |
Supporting Cast: Max Eigenmann, Luis Hontiveros, Angel Leighton
| 38 | "Ang Paring Tumiwalag" | Ashley Ortega | Neal del Rosario | Loi Argel Nova | October 11, 2025 |
Supporting Cast: Rolando Inocencio, Raquel Pareno, Mark Oliveros, Haley Dizon, Tom Rodriguez
| 39 | "Ang Huling Paalam" | Rita Daniela, Royce Cabrera | Zig Madamba Dulay | Karen Lustica | October 18, 2025 |
Supporting Cast: Bryan Benedict, Glydel Mercado
| 40 | "Ang Inang Inaswang" | Lianne Valentin, Jon Lucas | Richard Arellano | John Roque | October 25, 2025 |
Supporting Cast: Isay Alvarez, Lito Pimentel, RD Joson
| 41 | "Pinaslang ng Tikbalang" | Kristoffer Martin | Jules Katanyag | John Roque | November 1, 2025 |
Note: Replay story on October 21, 2023. Supporting Cast: Nonie Buencamino, Yayo Aguila, Kim de Leon, Ashley Rivera
| 42 | "My Mother, My Abuser" | Lexi Gonzales | Zig Dulay | Tina Samson Velasco | November 8, 2025 |
Supporting Cast: Dominic Ochoa, Maricar de Mesa, John Vic De Guzman, Patricia Tumulak, Ericca Laude
| 43 | "My Son's Birthday Wish" | Rochelle Pangilinan, Euwenn Mikaell | Adolf Alix Jr. | Loi Argel Nova | November 15, 2025 |
Supporting Cast: Arnold Reyes, Jeniffer Maravilla, Rita Avila
| 44 | "My Forbidden Love" | Andrea Torres, Dion Ignacio | Rod Marmol | Vienuel Ello | November 22, 2025 |
Supporting Cast: Cris Villanueva, Lovely Rivero, Gilleth Sandico, Gigi Locsin, Kiesha Cura
| 45 | "Ang Babae sa Likod ng Krimen" | Mikee Quintos | Zig Madamba Dulay | Gina Marissa Tagasa | November 29, 2025 |
Supporting Cast: Sef Cadayona, Simon Ibarra, Jenzel Angeles, Shamaine Buencamino, Gina Alajar
| 46 | "Ang Babae sa Death Row" | Beauty Gonzalez | Zig Madamba Dulay | Gina Marissa Tagasa | December 6, 2025 |
Supporting Cast: Sharmaine Arnaiz, Mia Pangyarihan, Karla Pambid, Simon Ibarra, Lotlot Bustamante, Kitsi Pagaspas, Gina Alajar
| 47 | "Dalawang Mukha ng Pasko" | Rocco Nacino, Thea Tolentino | Neal del Rosario | Loi Argel Nova | December 13, 2025 |
Supporting Cast: Joyce Ching, Madeleine Nicolas, Ronnie Liang, Atarah Faith Baid
| 48 | "Epal Dreamboy" (The Richard Licop Story) | Alden Richards | Irene Emma Villamor | John Roque | December 20, 2025 |
Richard Licop is dubbed an attention seeker in their community because of his social media posts, but behind this, a lot of people were unaware that he had to overcome many obstacles before achieving success. Watch how Richard goes through his life with a lot of hate and negative comments. Note: Part of Alden August Note: Replay story on August 12, 2023. Supporting Cast: Lotlot de Leon, Mon Confiado, Denise Barbacena, Roxie Smith, Victor Anastacio, Rolando Inocencio
| 49 | "I am Beautiful" (The Kiray Celis Story) | Kiray Celis | Rado Peru | Vienuel Ello | December 27, 2025 |
Kiray Celis is known as a former child star and is now making her name in the show business with her comedy wit. Despite her happy disposition, what are the painful trials has gone through in life? Note: Replay story on December 2, 2023. Supporting Cast: Tina Paner, Smokey Manaloto, Manolo Pedrosa, Radson Flores, Anjo Damiles, Clarence Delgado

=== 2026 ===
| No. | Title | Cast | Directed by | Written by | Original release date |
|---|---|---|---|---|---|
| 1 | "Heart of a Champion" (The Jong Madaliday Story) | Jong Madaliday | Rod Marmol | Jessie Villabrille | January 3, 2026 |
Supporting Cast: Epy Quizon, Sue Prado, Dexter Doria, Bodjie Pascua, Kenken Nuyad
| 2 | "Pangarap at Hustisya" | Jeric Gonzales, Lianne Valentin | Richard Arellano | John Roque | January 10, 2026 |
Supporting Cast: Tina Paner, Robert Seña, Art Acuña, Joseph Ison, Travis Clarino
| 3 | "A Son's Promise" (The Kokoy de Santos Story) | Kokoy de Santos | Neal del Rosario | Vienuel Ello | January 17, 2026 |
He wanted nothing but for his family to have a better life. But, fate dictated Kokoy's destiny. This is when he started in a BL movie, and would become one of the most popular celebrities in the world of showbiz. Note: Replay story on February 18, 2023. Supporting Cast: Shamaine Buencamino, Jong Cuenco, Analyn Barro, Migs Villasis, Jennie Gabriel
| 4 | "My Special Family" | Gardo Versoza, Isay Alvarez | Zig M. Dulay | Karen Lustica | January 24, 2026 |
Supporting Cast: Shayne Sava, Therese Malvar, Dave Bornea, Barbara Miguel, Shanelle Agustin
| 5 | "Most Beautiful Player" | Mike Tan | Richard Arellano | Jessie Villabrille | January 31, 2026 |
Supporting Cast: Andre Paras, Divine Tetay, Archi Adamos
| 6 | "Viral Yaya" | Rikki Mae Davao | Neal del Rosario | Vienuel Ello | February 7, 2026 |
Supporting Cast: Soliman Cruz, Jackie Lou Blanco, Kazel Kinouchi, Kuya Kurt, Lyra Micolob, Leon Edward Vanderson, Mia Krasovski
| 7 | "Sa Kabila ng Lahat" | Jak Roberto, Liezel Lopez | Zig M. Dulay | John Roque | February 14, 2026 |
Supporting Cast: Glenda Garcia, William Lorenzo, Alex Medina, Zonia Mejia
| 8 | "Unconditional Love" (The Jana Berenguer Story) | Bianca King | Jorron Lee Monroy | Karen Lustica | February 21, 2026 |
Supporting Cast: Gian Magdangal, Ervic Vijandre, Cheska Iñigo, Lloyd Samartino, Jennie Gabriel, Jeniffer Maravilla
| 9 | "Gua ai Di / I Love You" (The Richard Yap and Melody Yap Love Story) | David Licauco, Shaira Diaz | Don Michael Perez | Tina Samson-Velasco | February 28, 2026 |
Raised from the Chinese family, Richard Yap meets Filipina girl Melody and they start their relationship despite his father's commitment that he must marry a Chinese girl. Note: Replay story on February 13, 2021. Supporting Cast: Ricardo Cepeda, Joyce Ching
| 10 | "Ang Presong Nangarap Maging Pulis" | Yasser Marta | Kevin De Vela | Loi Argel Nova | March 7, 2026 |
Supporting Cast: Yayo Aguila, Mon Confiado, Kiel Rodriguez, Seb Pajarillo, Andrei Fajardo
| 11 | "Amo Ko, Mahal Ko" | Katrina Halili, Raymond Bagatsing | Zig Dulay | Gina Marissa Tagasa | March 14, 2026 |
Supporting Cast: Tart Carlos, Melissa Avelino, Dom Pangilinan
| 12 | "Ang Tanging Ina ni Herlene" | Herlene Budol | Mark Sicat Dela Cruz | Tina Samson Velaso | March 21, 2026 |
Supporting Cast: Juancho Trivino, Jay Arcilla, Anthony Falcon, Kimson Tan, Marife Necesito, Dani Ozaraga, Lhen Timbol
| 13 | "The Healer Wife" | Bea Alonzo | Zig Dulay | Gina Marissa Tagasa | March 28, 2026 |
Do you believe in faith healing? This is the life of a woman who had the ability to heal the illnesses of others but not her own family's. How long will her faith last? Note: Replay story on April 12, 2025 Supporting Cast: Tom Rodriguez, Max Eigenmann, Euwenn Mikaell
| 14 | "Ang Babae sa Larawan" | Andrea Torres, Rafael Rosell | Neal del Rosario | John Roque | April 11, 2026 |
Supporting Cast: Simon Ibarra, Mel Kimura, Maritess Joaquun, Shermaine Santiago, Liana Castillo
| 15 | "Little Big Dreamer" (The Jo Berry Story) | Jo Berry | L.A. Madridejos | Tina Samson Velasco | April 18, 2026 |
Supporting Cast: Nico Antonio, Shyr Valdez, Mike Peñaloza, Darwin Tolentino, Larkin Castor, Kiko Antonio, Analyn Barro
| 16 | "Kahit Maputi Na Ang Buhok Mo" | Kokoy de Santos, Sheryl Cruz, Rita Avila | Adolf Alix Jr. | Vienuel Ello | April 25, 2026 |
Supporting Cast: Kim de Leon, Princess Aliyah, Marnie Lapus, Jane Mounter
| 17 | "Nanay Kontesera" | Pokwang | Rechie del Carmen | Benson Logronio | May 2, 2026 |
Note: Replay story on July 10, 2021. Supporting Cast: Boom Labrusca, Tart Carlos, Ayra Mariano, Gold Aceron
| 18 | "Ang Inang Hindi Sumuko" (The Nanay Minerva Panganiban Story) | Amy Austria | Zig Dulay | Karen Lustica | May 9, 2026 |
Supporting Cast: Soliman Cruz, Miggs Cuaderno, Prince Clemente, Patricia Tumulak, Jeff Moses, Matthew Uy
| 19 | "Batang Nanay, Tatlong Panganay" | AJ Raval | Neal del Rosario | Gina Marissa Tagasa | May 16, 2026 |
Supporting Cast: Gabby Eigenmann, Madeleine Nicolas, John Vic De Guzman, Jenzel Angeles, Bryan Benedict
| 20 | "Mana sa Ina" | Arra San Agustin | Neal del Rosario | Tina Samson Velasco | May 23, 2026 |
Supporting Cast: Maricar de Mesa, Polo Ravales, Regine Tolentino, Gian Magdangal, Gil Cuerva, Rathian Cordero, Erika Davis
| 21 | "Itim Na Duwende" | Janice de Belen | Adolf Alix Jr. | John Roque | May 30, 2026 |
Supporting Cast: Lui Manansala, Karla Pambid, Andrei Fajardo, Raphael Landicho, RD Joson, Meghan Dionisio, Aly Alday
| 22 | "Tatlo Ang Tatay Ko" (The Christine Lara Mercado Story) | Cassy Legaspi | Richard Arellano | Gina Marissa Tagasa | June 6, 2026 |
Most of us would've had a pair of parents growing up, but Kristine is exceptional because she grew up with not only one or two fathers but three. Note: Replay story on August 31, 2024. Supporting Cast: Dominic Ochoa, Bobby Andrews, Epy Quizon, Sharmaine Arnaiz
| 23 | "Pinoy Pawnstar" (The Boss Toyo Story) | Edgar Allan Guzman | Mark Dela Cruz | Loi Argel Nova | June 13, 2026 |
Supporting Cast: Winwyn Marquez, Tanya Gomez, Leandro Baldemor, Jon Lucas, Kiel Rodriguez, Roxie Smith Aya Domingo, Alhejandro Mahilum
| 24 | "My Father Vlogger" (The Dondon Havana Story) | Mike Tan, Jennica Garcia | Richard Arellano | Gina Marissa Tagasa | June 20, 2026 |
No trial can stop a father's love. Despite his daughter's illness, Dondon remains strong and loving, working tirelessly for his family (this is a Father's Day Special episode). Supporting Cast: Isay Alvarez, Zed Malicsi, Brent Valdez, Miguel Liwanag, Darlyn Izabelle Salang, Marlon Mance
| 25 | "My X Wife" | Robb Guinto, Yasser Marta | Mark Dela Cruz | Jessie Villabrille | June 27, 2026 |
A desperate person clings to a knife! Out of dire need, Weng enters the world of adult content creation to earn a living. But what will happen when her boyfriend, Drew, finds out? Will he understand Weng's true motives, or will he judge her too? Supporting Cast: Ces Quesada, Keanna Reeves, Mike Lloren
| 26 | "From Poser to Forever" (The Marvin and Jane Bedonia Love Story) | Jerald Napoles, Kiray Celis | LA Madridejos | John Roque | July 4, 2026 |
Note: Replay story on May 4, 2019. Supporting Cast: Tanya Gomez, Elle Ramirez, Kiko Matos, Luri Nalus, Danielle Ozarriaga
| 27 | "Ganti Ni Misis" | Andrea Torres, Analyn Barro | Mark Sicat Dela Cruz | John Roque | July 11, 2026 |
Supporting Cast: Alex Medina, Carlo Gonzales, Anna Marin, Tonio Quiazon
| 28 | "Ang Katatagan ng Isang Ina" | Jake Vargas, Inah de Belen | LA Madridejos | John Roque | July 18, 2026 |
Supporting Cast: Maricar de Mesa, Elizabeth Oropesa, Angelu de Leon, Mad Ramos, Migs Cocepcion
| 29 | "Ang Laban At Bawi Ni Sugar Mercado" | Sugar Mercado | Jorron Lee Monroy | Loi Argel Nova | July 25, 2026 |
Supporting Cast: Yayo Aguila, Ahron Villena, Chuckie Dreyfus, Simon Ibarra, Jennie Gabriel, Gilleth Sandico, Elijah Alejo, Mitzi Josh
| 30 | "When I Fall in Laugh" (The Vincent "Petite" Aycocho Story) | Kevin Santos | Conrado Peru | Vienuel Ello | August 1, 2026 |
Petite is a gay who lives with his strict father and is alienated from his mother. He meets the girl named Jessica and they later married. Jessica also invites her daughter named Alma at Petite's house, but to Petite's disgust, his father starts a relationship with Alma. Note: Replay story on March 6, 2021. Supporting Cast: Snooky Serna, Dennis Padilla, Ashley Rivera
| 31 | "Kailan Muling Makakapiling?" (The Jullie Forsberg Belleza Story) | Shaira Diaz, Jeric Gonzales | Neal del Rosario | Gina Marissa Tagasa | August 8, 2026 |
Supporting Cast: Frances Makil-Ignacio, Kuya Kurt, Saviour Ramos, Patricia Coma, Vangie Castillo
| 32 | "Battered Wife For Hire" | Lianne Valentin, Juancho Trivino | Ralfh Manuel Malabunga | Jessie Villabrille | August 15, 2026 |
Supporting Cast: Elora Españo, Rathian Cordero, Mitchell Dawn Zion Narandan, Janna Trias
| 33 | "Reunited in Love" (The Fredmoore and Jennifer delos Santos Love Story) | Derrick Monasterio, Elle Villanueva | Neal del Rosario | Vienuel Ello | August 22, 2026 |
Supporting Cast: Nonie Buencamino, Shamaine Buencamino
| 34 | "From Russia With Love" | Max Collins, Nico Antonio | Don Michael Perez | Vienuel Ello | August 29, 2026 |
Note: Replay story on July 24, 2021. Supporting Cast: Tanya Gomez, Alberto Bruno
| 35 | "Anak Kong Social Media Addict" | Lotlot de Leon, Lexi Gonzales | Richard Arellano | John Roque | September 5, 2026 |
Supporting Cast: Alvin Fortuna, Dave Bornea, Seb Pajarillo, Larkin Castor, Shanelle Agustin, Migs Villasis, Bont Bryan, Nikki Co, Ryke Reyes
| 36 | "My Online Gambler Husband" | Rayver Cruz, Bianca King | Jorron Lee Monroy | Anna Aleta Nadela | September 12, 2026 |
Supporting Cast: Marcus Madrigal, Maritess Joaquin
| 37 | "The Prodigal Priest" (The Bienvenido Salinas Jr. Story) | Martin del Rosario, Lito Pimentel | Adolf Alix Jr. | Gina Marissa Tagasa | September 19, 2026 |
Supporting Cast: Arra San Agustin, Thea Tolentino, Rolando Inocencio, Ralph Miaco, Seth Dela Cruz, John David, Rowie Cardona, Kyle Kaizer Almenanza
| 38 | "From Hooker to Housekeeper" | Kylie Padilla | Neal del Rosario | John Roque | September 26, 2026 |
We all face tough trials in life that will test our mental strength and integrity. Watch the life story of Mabel, who went through a difficult experience from the age of six until she became an adult. Note: Replay story on March 15, 2025. Supporting Cast: Sharmaine Arnaiz, Mon Confiado, Sugar Mercado
| 39 | "Cotton Candy, Miracle Baby" | Kyline Alcantara, Romnick Sarmenta | Mark Sicat Dela Cruz | Loi Argel Nova | October 3, 2026 |
Supporting Cast: Ina Feleo, Michael Flores, Angelika Santiago
| 40 | "Pasan Ko, Kapatid Ko" | Kokoy de Santos | Jojo Nadela | Karen Lustica | October 10, 2026 |
Supporting Cast: Lovely Rivero, Simon Ibarra, Angelica Hart, Jay Ortega, Matthew Uy, Kiko Antonio
| 41 | "Amnesia Girl" | Sofia Pablo, Glydel Mercado | Carlo Catu | John Roque | October 17, 2026 |
Supporting Cast: Carla Martinez, Bobby Martino, Iñigo Jose, Vianna Ricafranca, Liana Castillo
| 42 | "Magkadikit na Kambal" | Ryza Cenon, Dion Ignacio | Neal del Rosario | Gina Marissa Tagasa | October 24, 2026 |
Supporting Cast: Dom Pangilinan, Raquel Pareno, Brianna Advincula, Brielle Advincula
| 43 | "Sa Aking Mga Mata" (The Ed Caluag Story) | Ed Caluag | Jorron Lee Monroy | John Roque | October 31, 2026 |
Ed Caluag, a paranormal expert, is no stranger to Philippine television as well as in social media. He became a staple name as a frequent guest in the top-rating magazine show Kapuso Mo, Jessica Soho. Despite his immense popularity, is a different side of him. Note: Replay story on January 11, 2020. Supporting Cast: Ces Quesada, Sef Cadayona, Tom Olivar, Sheila Marie Rodriguez, Skelly, Warren Tablo, Janelle Lewis, Alvin Maghanoy, Jazz Yburan
| 44 | "Mag-ama, Reunited sa Bus" | Caprice Cayetano | Richard Arellano | Jessie Villabrille | November 7, 2026 |
Supporting Cast: Katrina Halili, Neil Ryan Sese, Ericca Laude, Elle Ramirez
| 45 | "Sunog na Mukha" | Bianca Umali | Jerry Lopez Sineneng | Karen Lustica | November 14, 2026 |
Supporting Cast: Sherilyn Reyes-Tan, Cheska Fausto, Jenzel Angeles, Vince Maristela
| 46 | "Mama's Cradle" (The Carina Suarez Story) | Jennylyn Mercado | Mark Sicat dela Cruz | Vienuel Ello | November 21, 2026 |
Supporting Cast: Mel Kimura, Jose Sarasola, Joseph Ison, Baninay Bautista
