= Caluag =

Caluag is a Filipino surname of Tagalog origin. Notable people with the surname include:

- Christopher Caluag (born 1988), Filipino American BMX racer and civil engineer who competes for the Philippines internationally
- Daniel Caluag (born 1987), Filipino American BMX racer who competed for the Philippines in the BMX event of the 2012 Summer Olympics
- Ed Caluag (born 1962), Filipino paranormal investigator and exorcist in supernatural/paranormal phenomena.
- Tito Caluag (born 1958), Filipino priest, educator and author
- Vilma Caluag (born 1972), Filipino politician and businesswoman who is currently serving as the 33rd Mayor of San Fernando, Pampanga since 2022
