= Rudy Baldwin =

Filipino internet personality and psychic

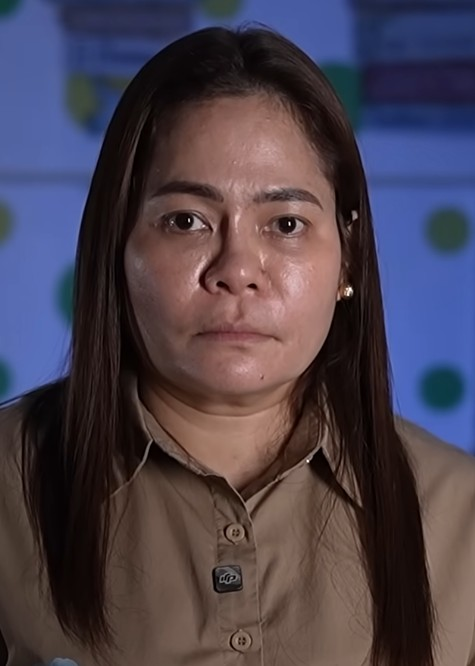
- Baldwin in 2026
- Citizenship: Filipino
- Occupations: Social media personality, vlogger
- Known for: Predictions regarding natural disasters and celebrity deaths

Rudy Baldwin is a Filipino social media personality who describes herself as a psychic, visionary, and dream translator. She shares her predictions on Facebook and YouTube, often talking about possible natural disasters, accidents, and even the deaths of well-known personalities. Some media outlets feature her earlier posts, while others question the accuracy of her claims and remain doubtful of her abilities.

== Career and online presence ==
Baldwin gained popularity on social media by posting "visions" of upcoming events. She often writes her posts in capital letters to emphasize her warnings. She claims that her visions come from God and are intended to serve as warnings for people to pray and prepare. She has millions of followers on her social media platforms.

== Notable predictions ==
Baldwin has made numerous predictions concerning public safety, entertainment, and politics.

=== Natural disasters ===
Baldwin frequently predicts natural calamities such as earthquakes, volcanic eruptions, and typhoons. In early 2020, she claimed to have predicted the eruption of Taal Volcano. In 2021, she warned of seven specific visions for the remainder of the year, including bodies floating in water due to crimes and accidents. For the year 2022, she predicted that it would be a "year of disaster" involving strong typhoons. She described 2023 as a "year of bad karma," warning that karma would come quickly to those who do bad things. In late 2025, she warned that 2026 would see "The Big One" earthquake in the Philippines and multiple pandemics. She also predicted a new type of airborne bacteria for 2025.

=== Accidents and aviation ===
Baldwin has posted warnings about aviation accidents. Following the 2021 C-130 Hercules crash in Sulu, reports noted that she had posted about an air accident a month prior. In June 2025, she posted a vision about an aircraft accident in an Asian country involving lightning; three days later, an Air India flight crashed. She also warned of a footbridge collapse in Bicutan in 2020.

=== Showbiz and personalities ===
A significant portion of Baldwin's content involves predictions about celebrities. She gained widespread attention in 2020 for allegedly predicting the death of basketball player Kobe Bryant. After the death of actress Jaclyn Jose in 2024, netizens resurfaced a post by Baldwin that mentioned a veteran actress would pass away due to a tragedy or accident. In 2025, Baldwin predicted that a famous vlogger and actress would suffer from cancer, which many believed referred to Ivana Alawi; Alawi later clarified that she had been hospitalized for polyendocrine metabolic ovarian syndrome (PMOS) complications, not cancer. She has also commented on the health of Kris Aquino, advising her to look at "one side of the world" and suggesting water therapy rituals. In 2025, reports circulated that she predicted the deaths of Pilita Corrales and Nora Aunor after she posted about two veteran artists passing away, though she did not name them in her original post.

=== Politics ===
Baldwin has shared visions regarding Philippine politics. In 2025, she criticized a government official's plan to investigate the confidential funds of Vice President Sara Duterte, suggesting they should focus on flood control budgets instead. For the 2022 elections, she predicted election-related violence and deaths. She has also predicted the death of an Asian leader, which some linked to the passing of former president Benigno Aquino III in 2021.

== Controversies and criticism ==
Baldwin's predictions have faced criticism for being vague or causing fear. She has been involved in disputes with other internet personalities.

In 2021, Baldwin's former manager, Elzen Estores, complained about her on the program Raffy Tulfo in Action. Estores claimed that Baldwin made fake predictions, including a claim that Estores would become a mayor and would be a leading lady for actor Piolo Pascual. Baldwin denied the accusations.

Baldwin also had a conflict with social media personality Xian Gaza, who called her a "scammer" and a "con man". In August 2021, Baldwin filed cyber libel cases against Gaza and several fake accounts that were using her name.

Despite the criticism, Baldwin maintains that she shares her negative visions to help people avoid accidents and crimes. She has also warned the public about fake Facebook pages impersonating her.
