= Gina Marissa Tagasa-Gil =

Filipino screenwriter

Gina Marissa Tagasa is a Filipino television writer and film writer. She is a former resident writer for ABS-CBN Corporation and currently, a resident writer for GMA Network.

== Filmography ==
=== Creator ===
- Dyosa (2008)
- Pieta (2008–09)
- Valiente (2012) (as lyrics)
- Maria Mercedes (2013–14)
- Two Wives (2014–15)
- Tubig at Langis (2016)
- Magpahanggang Wakas (2016–17)

=== Writer/Headwriter/Creative Manager ===
- Magpakailanman (2018, 2019)
- Dear Uge (2018, 2019)
- Ang Forever Ko'y Ikaw (2018)
- Kung Mahawi Man Ang Ulap (2007)
- Pieta (2008–09)
- Nasaan Ka, Elisa? (2011–12)
- Maria Mercedes (2013–14)
- Two Wives (2014–15)
- Tubig at Langis (2016)
- Mga Kuwento ni Lola Basyang (2007)
- Marinara (2004)
- Ang Iibigin ay Ikaw (2002)
- GMA Telesine
- Sa Puso Ko, Iingatan Ka (2001)
- Labs Ko Si Babe (1999–2000)
- Ipaglaban Mo! (1988–1999)
- Lovingly Yours, Helen (1984)
- Coney Reyes on Camera
- Maricel Soriano Drama Special
- Valiente (1992–1997)
- Agila
- Heredero

=== Film ===
- Nakagapos na Puso (1986)
- Kung Aagawin Mo ang Lahat sa Akin (1987)
- Isusumbong Kita sa Diyos (1988)
- Natutulog Pa ang Diyos (1989)
- Kung Tapos na ang Kailanman (1990)
- Kislap Sa Dilim (1991)
- Moments of Love (2006)
- Eternity (2006)
- Angels (2007)
- Hide and Seek (2007)
- Mama's Girl (2018)
- One Great Love (2018)
- The Heiress (2019)
