= Kuya Kurt =

American vlogger

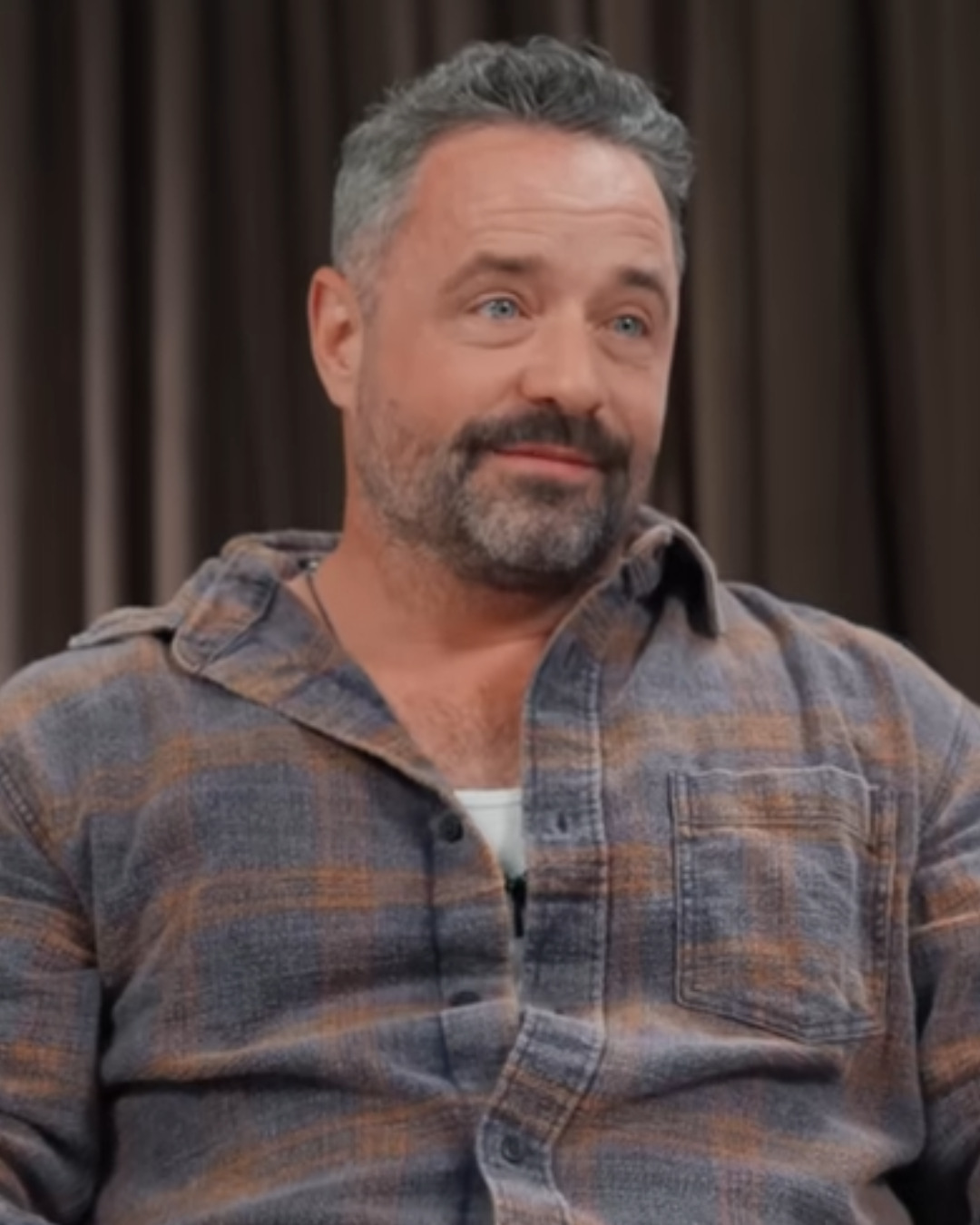
- Harris in 2026
- Born: Kurt Harris; June 15, 1982 (age 44); Salt Lake City, Utah, U.S.
- Other name: Tagalog Kurt
- Education: University of Utah (BS), (MS)
- Occupations: Vlogger; content creator; occasional actor
- Years active: 2018–present

YouTube information
- Channel: Kuya Kurt
- Years active: 2007–present
- Genre: Vlog
- Subscribers: 521 thousand
- Views: 137 million
- Military career
- Allegiance: United States
- Branch: United States Marine Corps
- Service years: 1999–2010
- Rank: Staff Sergeant
- Unit: 1st Battalion, 1st Marines

Kurt Harris (born June 15, 1982), also known as Kuya Kurt, is an American vlogger and social media personality. He is known for videos about Filipino culture and everyday life in the Philippines. Often referred to as the "Carinderia Inspection Agent", he travels around the Philippines visiting carinderias and street food stalls in different parts of the country and documents his visits on social media.

== Early life ==
Kurt Harris was born on June 15, 1982. At age 19, while living in Salt Lake City, Utah, he traveled to the Philippines as a Mormon missionary, serving for two years in Northern Luzon, including Abra, Pangasinan, La Union, and other parts of the Ilocos Region. Before leaving for the Philippines, Harris attended missionary training in Utah, where he learned basic Tagalog. He continued studying the language while serving in Northern Luzon.

Harris returned to the United States, and served in the United States Marine Corps.

== Career ==
After returning to the United States, Harris worked in the banking and software industries. He earned a master's degree in finance. In 2018, he created social media accounts under the name "Tagalog Kurt" to document his efforts to relearn Tagalog. In the same year, he returned to the Philippines for the first time since 2003 and began posting videos about food and everyday life. Carinderias were a frequent subject of his videos, leading to the "Carinderia Inspection Agent" persona.

In 2024, Harris appeared in the short film Dog in Search of a Leash, directed by Bon Jamora, portraying the character Bill.

In 2026, Harris had uploaded more than 600 vlogs from various parts of the Philippines. In March, he signed with Artist Circle and later took on television, film, and endorsement work. He later made a guest appearance in an episode of Magpakailanman and appeared in the television series The Master Cutter.

== Personal life ==
Harris has seven siblings, including five brothers and two sisters. His father was a military serviceman, and his grandfather also served in the armed forces. He mentioned that he plans to stay in the Philippines and hopes his content inspires people to value and appreciate the country's culture and traditions.

In 2016, while living in Salt Lake City, Utah, Harris fell victim to a theft by a fake, self-proclaimed fellow military veteran he had let stay in his home because the person needed a place to live.

== Filmography ==
=== Film ===
Year	Title	Role	Ref.
2024	Dog in Search of a Leash	Bill	

=== Television ===
Year	Title	Role	Ref.
2024	TiktoClock	Guest appearance	
2026	Magpakailanman	William	
2026	The Master Cutter	Pares stall owner	
2026	Amazing Earth	Himself	
