= Ed Caluag =

Filipino paranormal expert and investigator

- Born: Edgardo Panuncialman Caluag; April 20, 1962 (age 64); Malolos, Bulacan, Philippines
- Other name: Boyet
- Occupations: Paranormal expert, Teacher
- Years active: 2000–present
- Organization: Philippine Paranormal Experts Society (PPES)
- Known for: Paranormal investigations, exorcisms
- Spouse: Marilyn Laluan–Caluag (1996–2010)
- Partner: Mira Belle Malaluan (2018–present)
- Children: 3

Edgardo "Ed" Panuncialman Caluag (born April 20, 1962) is a Filipino paranormal investigator and exorcist in supernatural/paranormal phenomena. He has appeared on various television shows such as Kapuso Mo, Jessica Soho, Tunay na Buhay, and specifically Magpakailanman where he was featured on the episode "Sa Aking Mga Mata: The Ed Caluag Story". Caluag has also been frequently featured on various paranormal radio shows to explain issues, trending topics, and events believed to be paranormal of nature.

== Early life and education ==
Ed was born in Malolos City, Bulacan. He suffered from polio when he was only 7 years old. He is a graduate of Bachelor of Science in Elementary Education and a licensed professional teacher.

Ed gained popularity after guesting in weekly magazine show Kapuso Mo, Jessica Soho (KMJS) as a consultant giving explanation on segments that tackle the paranormal. Some of these segments include “Bato-Bato Sa Langit,” “Manila City Hall” (Gabi Ng Lagim VI), “Ala-ala ng Lagim”, “Anino sa Pader”, “Sa Kanto ng Mga Kaluluwa”, “Itim na Panalangin”, and “Palaka”.

On another instance in 2019, Ed received negative reception online for the episode "Ghost Ship", where KMJS investigated an alleged mysterious "ghost ship" sighting in Siquijor but it was later on revealed to be one of Cokaliong Shipping Lines' ferries plying the Cebu-Ozamiz-Cebu route. The case in point was the vessel M/V Filipinas Iligan. On the same segment and episode, KMJS provided scientific explanation and facts as well as insights from seafarers and the Philippine Navy. All of which seem to negate and rebut the explanation of Caluag that involves alleged ghosts in the area.

== Personal life ==
He has a girlfriend named Mira Belle Malaluan. Ed Caluag and Mira have been together since 2018. They officially shared details about their relationship publicly in October 2024 during an appearance on the GTV show Lutong Bahay. During the episode, Ed Caluag shared a romantic backstory, revealing that Mira Belle is the exact woman he had frequently seen in his dreams since his childhood. When they finally met in real life, he was deeply astonished by the coincidence. Mira Belle has expressed great happiness regarding their long-term relationship.
