= Fonz (disambiguation) =

The Fonz is a nickname of the fictional character Arthur Fonzarelli in the television sitcom Happy Days.

Fonz may also refer to:

- Fonz (content creator), a Filipino content creator
- Fonz (video game), a 1976 arcade racing video game based on the television series
- Fonz, Huesca, Spain, a municipality
- Carmen Guadalupe Fonz (born 1954), Mexican politician

== See also ==
- Lucky Fonz III (fl. 2005–?), Dutch singer-songwriter Otto Wichers (born 1981)
