= Fonz (content creator) =

Filipino content creator and actor

- Born: Aldrich Nartia; Philippines
- Occupations: Actor; vlogger; comedian; influencer
- Years active: 2017–present
- Known for: Comedic skits

Aldrich Nartia, known professionally as Fonz or Fonzi, is a Filipino content creator and actor known for his comedic skits on TikTok. He gained popularity for his relatable and character-driven videos, often featuring humorous twists on everyday situations. As of 2026, he has over 1.5 million followers on TikTok.

== Early life and background ==
Nartia is from Cavite. He developed an interest in performing at a young age, participating mostly in school and the community.

During his early years, he auditioned for commercials but faced repeated rejections, which led him to briefly step away from pursuing acting professionally. Despite this, he continued to nurture his interest in performance and entertainment. But before entering the entertainment industry, Nartia aspired to work as a barista in Singapore. He had previously worked at a coffee shop there, but his plans to return were unsuccessful after an acquaintance who had been assisting him with employment arrangements ceased communication and allegedly failed to compensate him for work he had performed.

== Career ==
=== Content creation ===
Fonz began creating content on TikTok as a way to improve his acting skills and express his creativity. His videos, which often feature multiple characters and humorous scenarios, quickly gained traction among viewers.

He is known for portraying a wide range of roles in his skits, including commuters, robbers, ghosts, and other everyday characters, often incorporating unexpected comedic twists. His content has been described as relatable and versatile, with recurring concepts such as his "commuter" series and other situational sketches. He is also recognized for using a handheld microphone as a recurring element in his videos.

Prior to his mainstream success, one of his early viral moments involved a parody video featuring Kris Aquino, which led to opportunities behind the scenes in content production. In April 2024, actor Tom Rodriguez also reacted to one of Fonz's viral videos, where he humorously commented on his own singing cover. The video, which portrayed Aquino in a humorous mock job interview, caught Aquino's attention and led to her offering him a position on her team. The opportunity marked his entry into the entertainment industry and preceded his rise as a social media content creator. Following the viral success of his Kris Aquino parody video, Nartia joined Aquino's production team as a production assistant. He later advanced to the role of junior producer for Aquino's vlog productions, remaining with the team for nearly three years before focusing on his own content creation and acting career.

By 2022, he had accumulated millions of likes and views on TikTok, further establishing his presence as a digital content creator.

=== Acting career ===
Fonz transitioned into mainstream media when he was cast in the television series Apoy sa Dugo, which premiered on March 2, 2026 on GMA Network's GMA Afternoon Prime.

He portrayed the character "Fonzi", the best friend of one of the lead characters. This marked his first major television role.

In interviews, Fonz described the role as a fulfillment of his long-time ambition to become an actor, noting that acting had been his goal since his school years.

He has also appeared in collaborative content alongside fellow cast members such as Ashley Ortega, Elle Villanueva, and Derrick Monasterio.

Prior to joining Apoy sa Dugo, he was offered a role in the series Beauty Empire but declined due to scheduling conflicts.

=== Others ===
Fonz has collaborated with various brands and participated in campaigns promoting social awareness, including a youth-driven initiative focused on health awareness.

He has also worked on branded content, including a promotional collaboration with Netflix for the film Heart of Stone, alongside Ai-Ai delas Alas.

== Personal life ==
Despite his energetic and outgoing persona in videos, Fonz has described himself as an introvert. He has shared that his experiences growing up, including bullying during childhood, influenced his personality and approach to content creation.

== Filmography ==
=== Television ===
Year	Title	Role	Notes	Ref(s)
2026	Apoy sa Dugo	Fonzi	Supporting cast	
2026	Unang Hirit	Himself	Guest	
2026	Taskforce Firewall	Mondo	Guest cast	
2026	It's Showtime	Himself	Guest	
