= Kumander =

Kumander, a Filipinized rendering of the English word commander, may refer to:

== People ==
- Kumander Liwayway (1919–2014), Filipino guerrilla

== Films ==
- Kumander Dante (film), Philippine film
- Kumander Bawang: Kalaban ng Mga Aswang, Philippine film
- Anak ng Kumander, Philippine film
- Gabi Na, Kumander, Philippine film
- No Retreat... No Surrender... Si Kumander, Philippine film
- Feliciano Luces: Alyas Kumander Toothpick, Mindanao, Philippine film
