= Voltes V: Legacy – The Cinematic Experience =

2023 Philippine film

- Theatrical release poster
- Directed by: Mark A. Reyes V
- Written by: Suzette Doctolero; Loi Nova; Libay Trinidad; Jake Somera
- Screenplay by: Suzette Doctolero
- Based on: Voltes V (1977) by: Saburo Yatsude; Voltes V: Legacy (2023); by Suzette Doctolero
- Starring: Miguel Tanfelix; Ysabel Ortega; Radson Flores; Raphael Landicho; Matt Lozano; Martin del Rosario
- Cinematography: Gary L. Gardose
- Edited by: Paolo Mendoza
- Production company: GMA Entertainment Group
- Distributed by: GMA Network; GMA Pictures; Toei (Japanese releases)
- Release date: April 19, 2023 (Philippines)
- Running time: 105 minutes
- Country: Philippines
- Language: Filipino

Voltes V: Legacy – The Cinematic Experience is a 2023 Philippine action drama science fantasy film produced by GMA Entertainment Group in association with Telesuccess Productions, Toei Company and Sunrise and released by GMA Network and GMA Pictures. It was directed by Mark A. Reyes from a screenplay written by Suzette Doctolero, and co-written Loi Nova, Libay Trinidad and Jake Somera.

Based on the Japanese anime television series of the same name, the film covers footage from the first 15 episodes of the Philippine live action adaptation television series of the aforementioned anime, Voltes V: Legacy. The film stars Miguel Tanfelix, Radson Flores, Matt Lozano, Raphael Landicho and Ysabel Ortega.

Voltes V: Legacy – The Cinematic Experience premiered in the Philippines on April 19, 2023; 2 weeks before Voltes V: Legacy premiered in GMA Network on May 8, 2023.

In Japan, the Ultra Electromagnetic Edition of the film released in theaters on October 18, 2024. The production features improved editing, Japanese dubbing and additional scenes not shown in the original release.

== Cast and characters ==
Main cast

- Miguel Tanfelix as Steve Armstrong
- Ysabel Ortega as Jamie Robinson
- Radson Flores as Mark Gordon
- Raphael Landicho as Little Jon Armstrong
- Matt Lozano as Robert "Big Bert" Armstrong
- Martin del Rosario as Zardoz
- Liezel Lopez as Zandra
- Epy Quizon as Zuhl
- Carlo Gonzales as Draco
- Gabby Eigenmann as Oscar Robinson

Supporting cast

- Neil Ryan Sese as Larry Hook
- Albert Martinez as Richard Hamaguchi Smith
- Christian Vasquez as Zu Zambojil
- Ryan Eigenmann as Zu Zander
- Chanda Romero as Sandra
- Nico Antonio as Oslack
- Jamie Wilson as Garth
- Elle Villanueva as Eva Sanchez
- Jamir Zabarte as Tomas del Rosario
- Sophia Senoron as Ally Chan
- Crystal Paras as Judy / Judalah
- Angela Alarcon as Kelly Bautista
- Dave Duque as PJ
- Julia Pascual as Anna
- Kimson Tan as Tadao Santiago
- Migs Villasis as Apable
- Joaquin Manansala as Edwards
- Jon Lucas as Ignacio
- Dion Ignacio as Obgen
- Juan Rodrigo as Baden
- Kyle Ocampo as Amira
- Kokoy de Santos as Harvey Perez
- Michael V. as the voice of Octo-1
- Dennis Trillo as Hrothgar / Ned Armstrong
- Carla Abellana as Mary Ann Armstrong
- Max Collins as Rozalia
- Carlos Siguion Reyna as a Boazanian emperor
- Seth dela Cruz as younger Steve
- Steven Canja as younger Bert
- Khaine dela Cruz as younger Zardoz

== Production ==
Voltes V: Legacy – The Cinematic Experience is based on Voltes V: Legacy, a Philippine live action adaptation of the Japanese anime series Voltes V produced by Toei Company and Sunrise. GMA Network acquired the rights to produce the television series through Telesuccess Productions.

The Cinematic Experience is a compilation film covering the TV series' first 15 episodes, hence it consequentially shares production history with its source material. In January 2020, GMA Network hired Riot Inc. for the post-production of Voltes V: Legacy. Toei Company supervised the series, whom later gave an approval through a commendation letter.

Mark A. Reyes was hired as the director of Legacy, and has been attached for eight years, from the pitching and approval of the series. Noel Layon Flores served as the lead visual designer. Suzette Doctolero was attached as the writer. GMA Network President Annette Gozon-Valdes is credited by Reyes on the idea of producing The Cinematic Experience, the film version of the TV series.

Production of the television series was delayed due to the COVID-19 pandemic in 2020. Principal photography commenced on May 28, 2021. It was halted in August 2021 due to the enhanced community quarantine in Metro Manila. Filming resumed on September 18, 2021 and concluded in August 2023.

== Music ==
The Cinematic Experience adapted a rearranged version of the score from the source anime. The theme of the anime was also used for the film, with Julie Anne San Jose doing a cover of Mitsuko Horie's song.

== Release ==
Voltes V: Legacy – The Cinematic Experience premiered in SM North EDSA, Quezon City, and SM Mall of Asia, Pasay on April 19, 2023. The source material, Voltes V: Legacy, made its television debut on GMA Network on May 8, 2023, following the premiere of The Cinematic Experience.

A prequel episode connected to the film, entitled Yoake no Mae (夜明けの前), was released on September 10, 2024, by Toei on its YouTube channel. This prequel explores the origins of Voltes V.

Japan released the Ultra Electromagnetic Edition (超電磁編集版, Cho Denji Henshu Ban) of the film in theaters on October 18, 2024. This version featured Japanese audio and additional scenes not included in the Cinematic Experience release shown in the Philippines.

The film was released on Netflix on September 19, 2025, under Voltes V: Legacy – The Movie.

== Reception ==
A positive review in The Philippine Star stated, "Although multilingual in dialogues, the movie mostly showcases a more poetic form of Filipino, occasionally injected with gay lingo and modern-day pop culture terms like “fake news,” which help bring the “Voltes V” brand from the ‘70s to today’s Gen-Zs." A review on PEP, also positive, admitted, "It is easy to get lost in its superb visual effects, albeit there are a few hard-to-miss details that demonstrates the limitations of CGI (Computer-Generated Imagery). One example is the cartoonish appearance of the Voltes V members while alighting from the launch conveyors." Another review, in PhilStar Life, found the film was a "good preview" of the series but presented some flaws in is conception.

In 2024, The Mindanao Times announced that the film would be the first "Tagalog film to be featured in the Japan Film Festival."
