= Matet de Leon =

Filipino actress (born 1983)

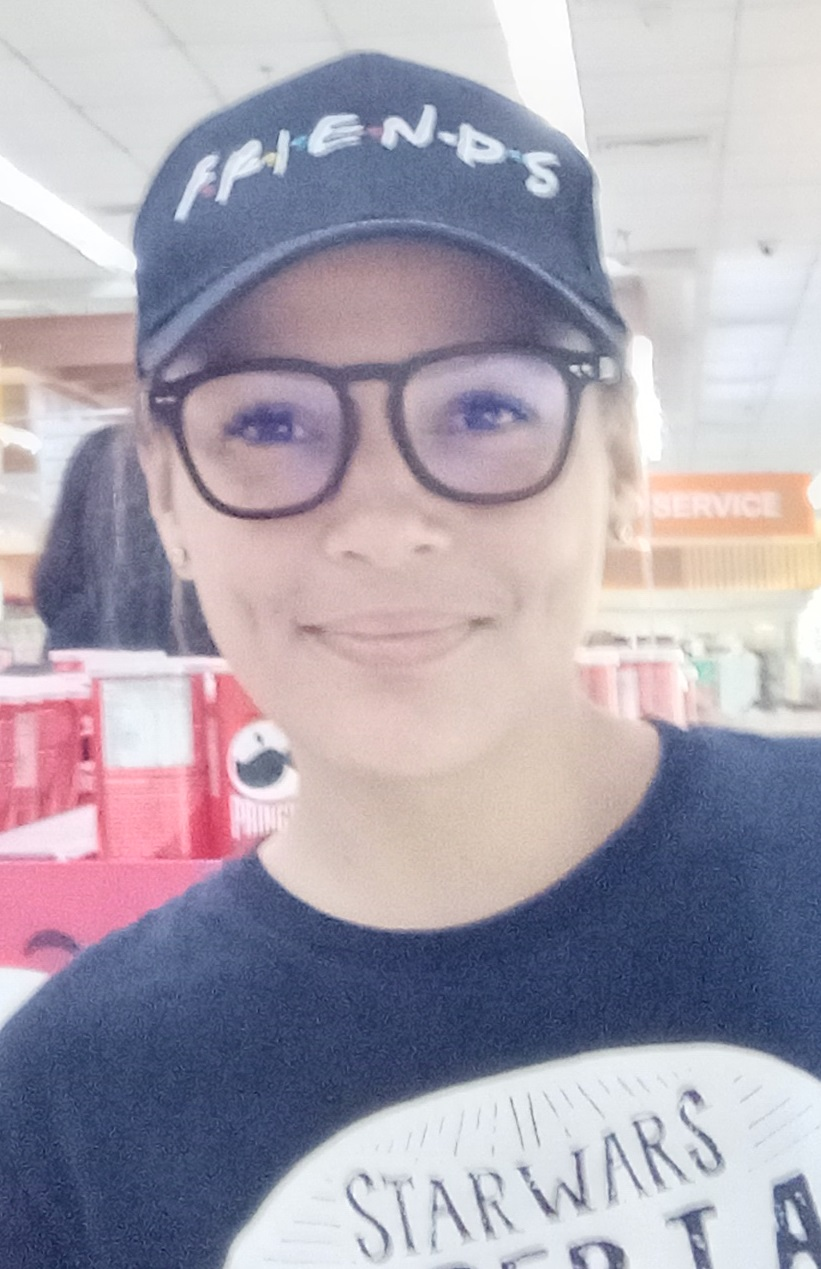
- De Leon in 2023
- Born: Maria Nora Ana Theresa Villamayor; October 4, 1983 (age 42); Manila, Philippines
- Occupation: Actress
- Years active: 1986–present
- Spouse: Mickey Estrada (m. 2004)
- Children: 4
- Parents: Christopher de Leon (adoptive father); Nora Aunor (adoptive mother)
- Relatives: Lotlot de Leon (adoptive sister); Janine Gutierrez (adoptive niece); Gil de León (adoptive grandfather); Lilia Dizon (adoptive grandmother)

Maria Nora Ana Theresa "Matet" Villamayor de Leon-Estrada (born October 4, 1983) is a Filipino actress who began her career as a child actor. She then transitioned to a supporting actress, often taking roles as the best friend of the main characters, giving her the nickname "Best Friend ng Bayan". She is an adopted daughter of actors Christopher de Leon and Nora Aunor.

== Early life ==
De Leon was adopted by actors Christopher de Leon and Nora Aunor. She also has an adopted sister, Lotlot, and two adopted brothers, Kiko and Kenneth. Their eldest brother, Ian, is the only biological child in the family.

== Career ==
=== 1980s–1990s ===
De Leon's first film was I Love You, Ma, I Love You, Pa in 1986, which was also the film debut of her siblings Lotlot and Ian. She then appeared in several horror films. Her acting performance was noticed in the movie Bunsong Kerubin in which she played the lead role. This earned her a Best Child Actress nomination from the 1988 FAMAS Awards. Also in 1988, she got to act alongside Fernando Poe Jr. in the film One Day Isang Araw. From there she was able to get more film roles in a five-year span. In 1997, De Leon starred together with her mother Aunor in the film Mama Dito Sa Aking Puso and also appeared in the horror film Shake, Rattle & Roll VI.

=== 2000s–2010s ===
In 2001, De Leon took on her first television role in the drama Sa Dulo ng Walang Hanggan. She then appeared in more ABS-CBN teleseryes such as Tabing Ilog, the television remake of Bunsong Kerubin, and many more. She then took on roles as the best friend of the main characters in films such as Till There Was You and Till My Heartaches End. From the late 2000s to the early 2010s, she played Zoila in the romantic film trilogy A Very Special Love. She also took a supporting role in the series The Legal Wife as Rowena, Maja Salvador's confidante, and played Tracy Buenaventura in the romantic series A Love to Last. In 2015, she played Maris Racal's mother in the film Stars Versus Me, with her performance praised as one of the few positives from that film.

Beginning in 2015, De Leon did several GMA teleseryes such as InstaDad and That's My Amboy.

=== 2020s ===
In 2022, De Leon played Belle Mariano's mother in the film An Inconvenient Love. Her performance in that film led to her being nominated as Best Supporting Actress for the 2023 EDDYs. In 2023, she joined the casts of Unspoken Letters and Love Before Sunrise. She and her family also competed on Family Feud, where they won ₱200,000. In 2024, she joined the cast of Black Rider.

== Personal life ==
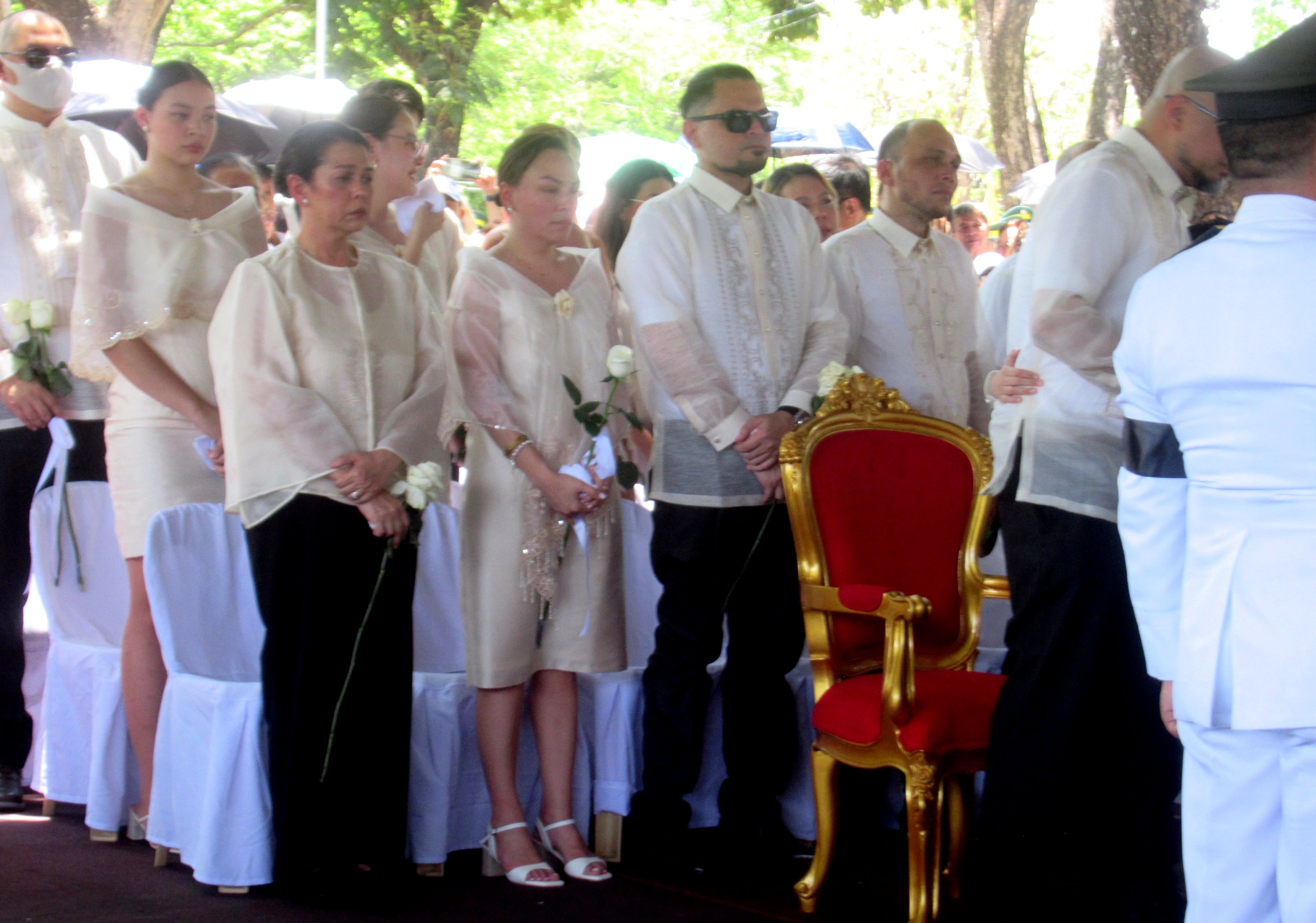
De Leon during her adoptive mother's burial at the Libingan ng mga Bayani in 2025

Since 2004, De Leon has been married to former NU Bulldogs basketball player-turned chef Mickey Estrada. They renewed their vows on their 18th wedding anniversary. They have three daughters. She had a son, Juan Miguel, who died after having been born prematurely at eight months and two weeks.

Her grandparents on her father's side, Gil de Leon and Lilia Dizon, were both actors.

De Leon has been diagnosed with general anxiety disorder and bipolar disorder. She revealed her diagnoses to the public in 2022.

De Leon owns a small business 'Casita Estrada,' which sells gourmet tuyo and tinapa.

== Awards ==
Year	Work	Award	Category	Result	Source
1988	Bunsong Kerubin	Best Child Actress	FAMAS Awards	Nominated	
1989	One Day, Isang Araw	Best Child Actress	FAMAS Awards	Won	
1990	Magic to Love	Best Child Actress	FAMAS Awards	Nominated	
1998	Mama Dito Sa Aking Puso	Best Child Actress	FAMAS Awards	Nominated	
2023	An Inconvenient Love	Best Supporting Actress	The EDDYs	Nominated	

== Filmography ==
=== Film ===
Year	Title	Role	Note(s)
1986	I Love You Mama, I Love You Papa	Matet	
1986	Inday Inday sa Balitaw	Tiyanak s	
1987	Bunsong Kerubin	Angelita	
1987	Tatlong Ina, Isang Anak		
1987	Takbo, Bilis... Takboooo!		
1987	Takot Ako, Eh!		
1987	1 + 1 = 12 (+ 1): One Plus One Equals Twelve (Cheaper by the Dozen)		
1988	Bobo Cop		
1988	One Day, Isang Araw	Precious / Purunggay	
1988	Kumander Bawang: Kalaban ng Mga Aswang	Luningning	
1989	Magic to Love	Twinkle	
1991	Dr. Potpot Travels to the Moon	Louise	
1997	Mama Dito sa Aking Puso		
1997	Shake, Rattle & Roll VI	Marice	
2000	Pangarap ng Puso	Nena	formerly titled Bulong ng Balakyot
2001	Abakada... Ina	Gina	
2002	May Pag-ibig Na Kaya?	Tere	
2003	Cass & Cary: Who Wants to Be a Billionaire?	Carol	
2003	Till There Was You	Jean	
2008	A Very Special Love	Zoila	
2009	You Changed My Life	Zoila	
2009	Hellphone		
2009	I Love You, Goodbye	Melai	
2010	Fling	Lanie	
2010	Dampi		
2010	Till My Heartaches End	Gemma	
2011	Rakenrol	Herself	
2011	Forever and a Day	Cam	
2012	24/7 in Love		
2013	It Takes a Man and a Woman	Zoila	
2013	My Lady Boss	Ruby	
2013	Pagpag: Siyam na Buhay	Eva	
2014	Da Possessed	Marie	
2015	Stars Versus Me	Elena's mother	
2015	#WalangForever	Director	
2016	The Third Party	Lila	
2016	The Super Parental Guardians	Sarah Nabati	
2018	The Significant Other		
2018	Da One That Ghost Away	Halak	
2021	Love or Money	Mima	
2022	An Inconvenient Love	Terry	

=== Television / digital series ===
Year	Title	Role	Note(s)
2001	Sa Dulo ng Walang Hanggan	Lucila "Lucy" Ilagan-Cristobal	
2003	Tabing Ilog	Honey	
2006	Komiks Presents: Bunsong Kerubin	Ellen	
2009	May Bukas Pa	Kim	
2009	Maalaala Mo Kaya	Babette	Episode: "Diary"
2010	Maalaala Mo Kaya	Merlinda	Episode: "Kuliglig"
2010	Habang May Buhay	Yolly	
2010	Elena M. Patron's Momay	Rose	
2010	Maalaala Mo Kaya	Mercy	Episode: "Plane Ticket"
2011	Munting Heredera	Belen	
2011	Ikaw Lang ang Mamahalin	Ising Somera	
2012	Broken Vow	Amy	
2012	Wansapanataym	Marita	Episode: "Plastik Pantastik"
2013	My Little Juan	Irma	
2013	Huwag Ka Lang Mawawala	Nancy	
2014	The Legal Wife	Rowena	
2014	Ipaglaban Mo: Lalaban ang Tatay para sa 'Yo	Elise	
2014	Maalaala Mo Kaya	Tess	Episode: "Jeep"
2014	Wansapanataym	Glenda Delgado	Episode: "Perfecto"
2015	InstaDad	Gracia	
2015	Pangako sa 'Yo	Chef Sam	
2016	Wansapanataym	Jhonaluz	Episode: "Susi ni Sisay"
2016	Dear Uge	Bekbek Balbacua	
2016	Juan Happy Love Story	Didith Dimanlinlang	
2016	Hay, Bahay!	Eba	
2016	That's My Amboy	Yolly	
2016	Maalaala Mo Kaya	Cynthia	Episode: "Sulat"
2017	Ipaglaban Mo: Buy-Bust	—	
2017	A Love to Last	Tracy Buenaventura	
2017	Wansapanataym	Cristy Agustin	Episode: "My Hair Lady"
2017	The Lolas' Beautiful Show	Guest	
2018	FPJ's Ang Probinsyano	Menchu Versoza	
2018	Tadhana: Dalawang Ina	Andrea	
2019	Nang Ngumiti ang Langit	Ruth Estacio-Dimagmaliw	
2020; 2023	Daddy's Gurl	Sharon / Ursula	
2021	Huwag Kang Mangamba	Rebecca Estopacio	
2022	Suntok sa Buwan	Nesthy	
2022	Niña Niño	Evelyn	
2023	Love Before Sunrise	Daisy Lacson-Pagdilao	
2023	Open 24/7	Mia	
2024	Black Rider	Belen	
2024	Lilet Matias: Attorney-at-Law	Ella	
2025	Slay: 'Til Death Do Us Part	Leona Baltazar	
2026	Apoy sa Dugo	Merly Aquino	

=== Microdrama ===
Year	Title	Role	Note(s)
TBA	Will You Fake Marry Me?		
