= Liwayway (name) =

Liwayway is a given name and surname. Notable people with the name include:

- Kumander Liwayway (1919–2014), Filipino guerrilla
- Liwayway Arceo (1924–1999), Filipina writer
- Liwayway Vinzons-Chato (born 1945), Filipino politician
