= James Graham (actor) =

Filipino-American actor (born 2006)

- Born: James David Graham; August 5, 2006 (age 20); Imus, Cavite, Philippines
- Occupation: Actor
- Years active: 2020–2025
- Agents: Adtracz Talent Management (2020–2022); Sparkle GMA Artist Center (2022–2025)
- Known for: Royal Blood (2023); Widows' War (2024–2025)

James David Graham (born August 5, 2006) is a Filipino-American actor. He is known for the role as Louie Castor in GMA Network's murder mystery crime drama series Royal Blood (2023) and Widows' War (2024–2025).

== Early life ==
James David Graham was born on August 5, 2006 in Imus, Cavite. According to Philippine news reports published in July 2026, he publicly disclosed his sexual orientation

== Career ==
James began his career when he was a talent in ABS-CBN. In 2020, he starred as young Gabo Villarica in Make It with You (TV series) and as young Anthony Villadarez in Maalaala Mo Kaya: Altar in 2022.

In 2022, he signed a contract in Sparkle (formerly GMA Artist Center). He was one of the nineteen artists debuted as "Sparkle Teens". He starred as Ivan in Wish Ko Lang! in the same year in his first TV guesting in GMA Network. He once later starred again in the show as Tony the next year.

In 2023, he gained recognition when he was given the role of Louie Castor in the Philippine television crime drama series Royal Blood. In 2024, he reprised his role in Widows' War.

James also guested in Philippine's adaptation of Family Feud, in Makiling (TV series) and in Pepito Manaloto: Tuloy ang Kuwento. He left show business to migrate in U.S.A.

== Filmography ==
=== Television ===
TV series
Year	Title	Role	Notes	Ref.
2020	Make It with You	Young Gabo Villarica	Guest role	
2022	2 Good 2 Be True	Young Eloy Borja	Guest role	
2023	Pepito Manaloto: Tuloy ang Kuwento	Edward	Guest role	
2023	Royal Blood	Louie Castor	Supporting role	
2024	Makiling	Popoy	Supporting role	
2024	Widows' War	Louie Castor	Supporting role	

Anthologies
Year	Title	Role	Notes	Ref.
2022	Maalaala Mo Kaya	Young Anthony Villadarez	Episode: "Altar"	
2022	Wish Ko Lang!	Ivan	Episode: "Utang na Loob"	
2023	Wish Ko Lang!	Tony	Episode: "Estudyante, Binato ng Tape!"	

Variety, game shows
Year	Title	Role	Notes	Ref.
2023	Family Feud Philippines	Himself/Guest Player		
2023	TiktoClock	Himself/Guest		
2024	The Clash	Himself/Video Greeting		

== Awards and nominations ==
Year	Award	Category	Result	Ref.
2023	7th Anniversary of the Philippine Outstanding Men & Women Awards 2023	Outstanding Youth of the Philippines	Won	
