= Lianne Valentin =

Filipino actress (born 2001)

- Born: Maria Leonor Valentino; August 16, 2001 (age 25); Iriga, Camarines Sur, Philippines
- Occupations: Actress; television presenter
- Years active: 2010–present
- Agent: Sparkle GMA Artist Center

Maria Leonor Valentino (born August 16, 2001), known professionally as Lianne Valentin, is a Filipino actress and television presenter. She is known for starring various television shows like Royal Blood (2023), Apoy sa Langit (2022) and Tropang Potchi (2009–2015).

== Early life and education ==
Maria Leonor Valentino was born on August 16, 2001, in Iriga, Camarines Sur, Philippines. During her school days, she joined poetry competitions.

In 2024, she finished her bachelor's degree in business administration, majoring in human resource management, from the ISHRM System School.

== Career ==
Valentin began working in commercials. In 2010, she made her first television acting debut through a children's show created by GMA Network, Tropang Potchi along with other notable child stars like Bianca Umali, Julian Trono and Ella Cruz.

She later made guest appearances to minor roles on various Filipino television shows like Princess in the Palace (2015), Meant To Be (2017), Mulawin vs. Ravena (2017), Super Ma'am (2017), Daig Kayo ng Lola Ko (2018), Sherlock Jr. (2017), Kambal, Karibal (2017–2018), Kapag Nahati ang Puso (2018), TODA One I Love (2019), Dahil Sa Pag-ibig (2019), Magkaagaw (2020), Kaibigan: The Series (2020), Anak ni Waray vs. Anak ni Biday (2021), Dear Uge (2021), Pepito Manaloto: Ang Unang Kwento (2021), Regal Studio Presents (2022–2023) and Hearts on Ice (2023).

In the 2020s, she starred as Jo Escobar in Ang Dalawang Ikaw (2021), Stella Fernandez in Apoy sa Langit (2022), Beatrice Royales in Royal Blood (2023) and Hannah Salalac in Lovers & Liars.

She also appeared in classic Filipino films such as Aswang (2011), Maledicto (2019) and Apo Hapon (2024).

In 2024, Lianne starred on the Philippine murder mystery drama series Widows' War, reprising her role as Beatrice Royales from Royal Blood.

== Filmography ==
=== Television ===
Year	Title	Role	Notes
2009–2015	Tropang Potchi	Herself	
2011	Sinner or Saint	Young Ikang	
2012	Valiente	Young Maila	
2012	Isang Dakot na Luha	Almira	
2013	Kidlat	Cindy	
2014	Elemento	Young Pandora	Episode: "Pandora, ang diwata ng Ilog Wawa"
2015	Oh My G!	Lianne	
2015	LolaBasyang.com		Episode: "Maryang Makiling"
2015	#ParangNormal Activity	Lucy Perez	Episode: "Yung may Sinapian"
2016	Princess in the Palace	Karen Mendoza	
2016	Walang Kapalit	Kristine	
2017	Meant To Be	Hailey	
2017	Mulawin vs. Ravena	Sheila	
2017	Super Ma'am	Esper	
2018	Sherlock Jr.	Sophie	
2018	Kambal, Karibal	Madeline	
2018	Kapag Nahati ang Puso	Ginger Santillan	
2019	TODA One I Love	Young Georgina	
2019	Dahil sa Pag-ibig	Madie	
2019	Pepito Manaloto: Ang Tunay Na Kwento	Jazmine Dimalanta	
2020	Magkaagaw	Pia Cordovez	
2020	Kaibigan: The Series	Anna Torres	
2020	Unconditional	Ysabel	
2021	Anak ni Waray vs. Anak ni Biday	Grace	
2021	Ang Dalawang Ikaw	Jo Escobar	
2021	Pepito Manaloto: Ang Unang Kuwento	Rose	
2022	Apoy sa Langit	Stella Fernandez	
2022	Daddy's Gurl	Baby	Episode: "Newbie"
2022	Abot-Kamay na Pangarap	Risa	
2022-23	Bubble Gang	Herself/Guest/Various Roles	
2023	Happy ToGetHer	Jessy	Episode: "Sheeesh"
2023	Hearts on Ice	Young Yvanna	
2023	Royal Blood	Beatrice "Bee" Royales	
2023–24	Lovers & Liars	Hannah Salalac	
2024	Walang Matigas na Pulis sa Matinik na Misis	Atty. Loretta Montecillo	
2024	Black Rider	Sr. Grace	
2024	Open 24/7	Lady	Episode: "First Move"
2024	Widows' War	Beatrice "Bee" Royales	a crossover character from Royal Blood.
2024	Lilet Matias: Attorney-at-Law	Aila Ocampo	
2025	My Ilonggo Girl	Ivana Velasquez	
2025	Akusada	Veronica "Roni" Pineda	
2026	Never Say Die	Zoey	

=== Drama anthology ===
Year	Title	Role	Notes
2014	Wattpad Presents	Camille	Episode: "Almost A Cinderella Story"
2018	Daig Kayo ng Lola Ko	Chrissy	Episode: "Alamat ng Alitaptap"
2018	Magpakailanman	Damcely	Episode: "Nakikita-Kita: A Blind Love Story"
2019	Dear Uge	Strawberry	Episode: "Melt With You"
2019	Maynila	Samantha	Episode: "Undying Love"
2019	Maynila	Lucy	Episode: "Hinagpis Ng Ina"
2021	Dear Uge	Petra	Episode: "K-Pak Ghorl"
2021	Daig Kayo ng Lola Ko	Isabel	Episode: "Captain Barbie"
2022	Regal Studio Presents	Isabelle	Episode: "About The Bride"
2022	Regal Studio Presents	Det	Episode: "Love Your Beat"
2022	Tadhana	Bianca	Episode: "Baliw Na Puso"
2023	Tadhana	Christine	Episode: "Nympha"
2023	Regal Studio Presents	Meryll	Episode: "I Love You, Bien"
2024	Regal Studio Presents	Lydia	Episode: "Sa Kabilang Bahay"
2024	Tadhana	Julie Guzman	Episode: "Rom and Julie"
2024	Regal Studio Presents	Angel	Episode: "My Amnesia Lover"

=== Films ===
Year	Title	Role	Ref
2011	Aswang	Hasmin	
2012	What Isn't There		
2012	Potpot		
2017	Amalanhig: The Vampire Chronicle	Van	
2017	Ang Guro Kong Hindi Marunong Magbasa		
2018	ML	Pat	
2019	Maledicto	Vicky	
2024	Apo Hapon	Unknown	
2025	Untold	Amanda	
