= Return to Paradise (Philippine TV series) =

2022 Philippine television drama series

- Title card
- Genre: Romantic drama
- Written by: Renato Custodio Jr.; Ma. Cristina Velasco; Glaiza Ramirez; Wiro Michael Ladera
- Directed by: Don Michael Perez
- Creative director: Aloy Adlawan
- Starring: Derrick Monasterio; Elle Villanueva
- Opening theme: "Hadlang Man ang Mundo" by Mitzi Josh
- Country of origin: Philippines
- Original language: Tagalog
- No. of episodes: 70

Production
- Executive producer: Nieva S. Magpayo
- Camera setup: Multiple-camera setup
- Running time: 20–31 minutes
- Production company: GMA Entertainment Group

Original release
- Network: GMA Network
- Release: August 1 – November 4, 2022

Return to Paradise is a 2022 Philippine television drama romance series broadcast by GMA Network. Directed by Don Michael Perez, it stars Derrick Monasterio and Elle Villanueva. It premiered on August 1, 2022 on the network's Afternoon Prime line up. The series concluded on November 4, 2022, with a total of 70 episodes.

The series is streaming online on YouTube.

== Cast and characters ==
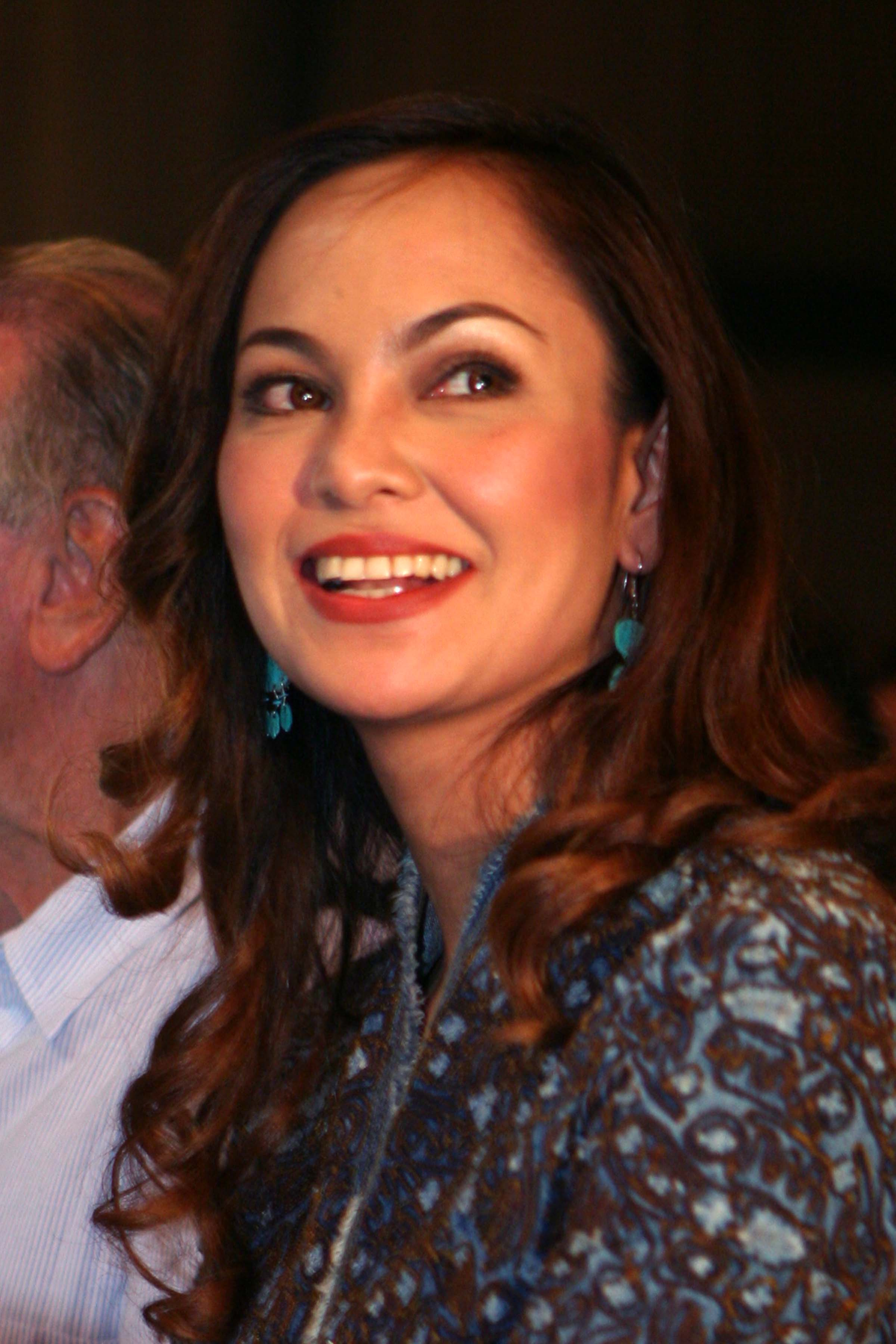
Eula Valdez portrays Amanda Madrigal.

Lead cast

- Derrick Monasterio as Red Ramos
- Elle Villanueva as Eden "Yenyen" Sta. Maria

Supporting cast

- Eula Valdez as Amanda Sta. Maria / Madrigal
- Teresa Loyzaga as Rina Lucero-Ramos
- Allen Dizon as Lucho Madrigal
- Ricardo Cepeda as Victor Ramos
- Karel Marquez as Dindi Sta. Maria
- Liezel Lopez as Sabina
- Kiray Celis as Raichu
- Paolo Paraiso as Zandro Lucero
- Mia Pangyarihan as Vinluan

== Production ==
Principal photography commenced in July 2022 in Jomalig, Quezon.

== Ratings ==
According to AGB Nielsen Philippines' Nationwide Urban Television Audience Measurement People in television homes, the final episode of Return to Paradise scored an 8.4% rating.
