= Widows' War =

Philippine television drama series

- Title card
- Genre: Crime drama; Mystery
- Created by: R.J. Nuevas; Ken de Leon
- Written by: Obet Villela; Ken de Leon; Jimuel dela Cruz; Abner Tulagan
- Directed by: Zig Madamba Dulay; Jerry Lopez Sineneng
- Creative director: Aloy Adlawan
- Starring: Bea Alonzo; Carla Abellana
- Theme music composer: Rina Mercado
- Opening theme: "Bakit Ba Naman?" by Rita Daniela and Hannah Precillas
- Country of origin: Philippines
- Original language: Tagalog
- No. of episodes: 145

Production
- Executive producer: Michele Robles Borja
- Production locations: Bataan; Batangas; La Union
- Cinematography: Miguel Cruz
- Editors: Robert S. Pancho; Julius James Castillo; James Kevin Li; Mark Oliver Sison
- Camera setup: Multiple-camera setup
- Running time: 19–39 minutes
- Production company: GMA Entertainment Group

Original release
- Network: GMA Network
- Release: July 1, 2024 – January 17, 2025

Widows' War is a Philippine television drama crime mystery series broadcast by GMA Network. Originally directed by Zig Madamba Dulay and later by Jerry Lopez Sineneng, it stars Bea Alonzo and Carla Abellana. It premiered on July 1, 2024 on the network's Prime line up. The series concluded on January 17, 2025, with a total of 145 episodes.

== Premise ==
Former best friends Sam and George, blame each other for an unfortunate happening between their families. They will once again encounter each other, and mourn the death of their respective husband – Paco and Basil.

== Cast and characters ==
Cast

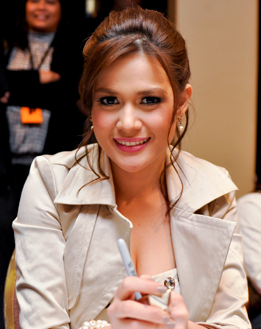
Bea Alonzo

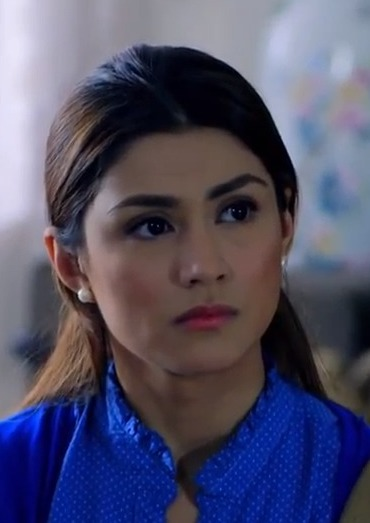
Carla Abellana

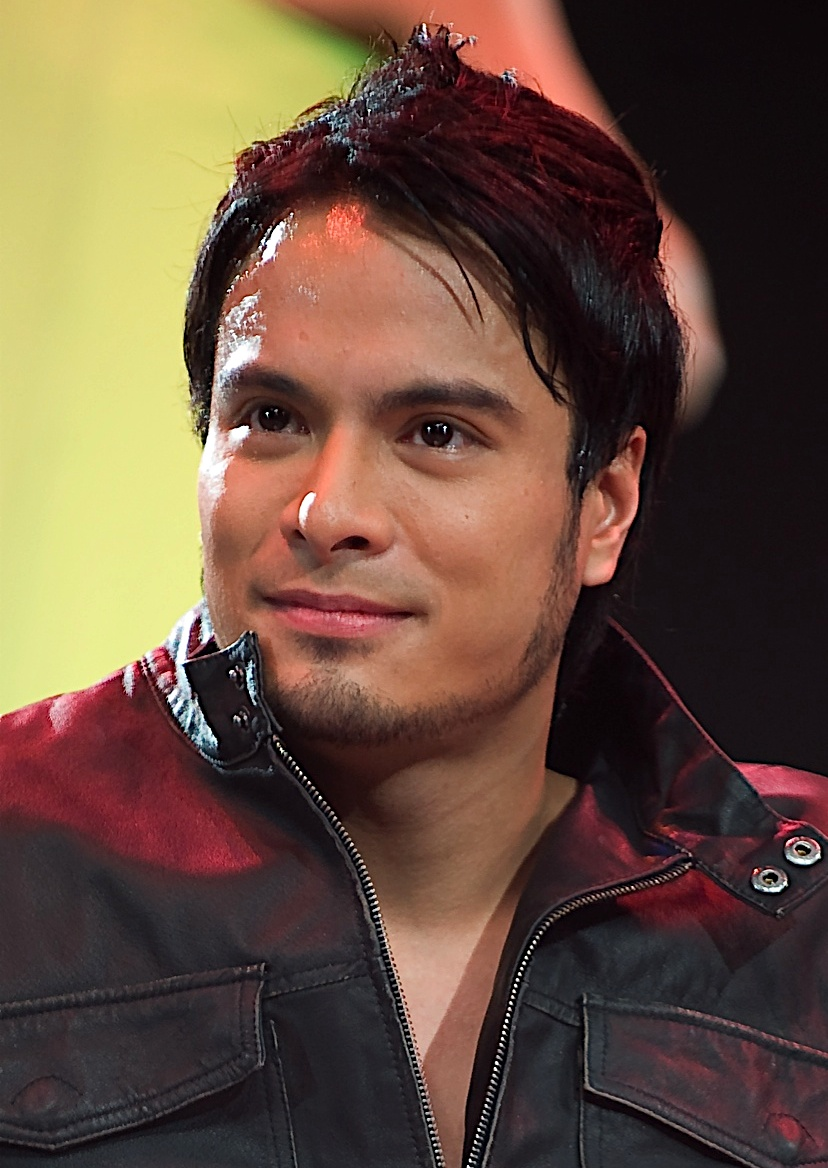
Rafael Rosell

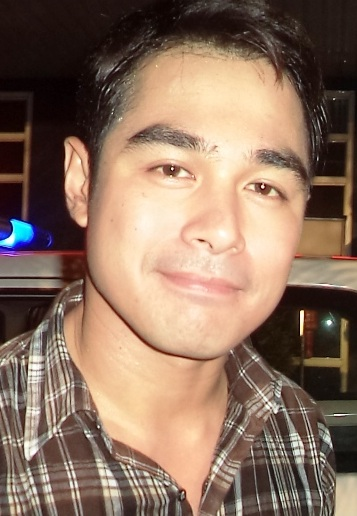
Benjamin Alves

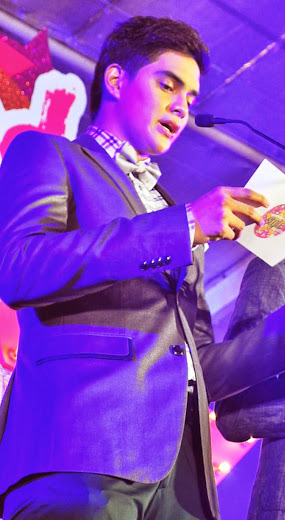
Juancho Triviño

Lead cast

- Bea Alonzo as Samantha "Sam" Castillo-Palacios: Paco's wife. She is George's best friend turned into an enemy, due to family problems.
- Carla Abellana as Georgina "George" Balay-Palacios: Sam's former best friend and Basil's wife.

Supporting cast

- Tonton Gutierrez as Galvan Palacios: Basil's father, Aurora's brother and the chief operating officer of the Palacios' mining company.
- Jackie Lou Blanco as Ruth Balay: George and Edward's mother.
- Lito Pimentel as Amando Namas: The Palacios' butler and Aurora's assistant.
- Timmy Cruz as Mercy Castillo: The mother of Sam and Francis.
- Jean Garcia as Aurora Palacios: Paco's mother, Galvan's younger sister and Rebecca's aunt.
- Rita Daniela as Rebecca Palacios: Aurora's niece and Paco and Basil's cousin.
- Jeric Gonzales as Francis Castillo: Sam's brother.
- Juancho Triviño as Abdul Casas: The investigator for the deaths of Paco and Basil.
- Royce Cabrera as Jericho Domo: A staff working in the Palacios' estate.
- James Graham as Louie Castor: Sofia's friend.
- Charlie Fleming as Sofia Trano: Basil's half-sister and Vivian's daughter.
- Matthew Uy as Edward Balay: George's younger brother.

Recurring cast

- Benjamin Alves as Basil Palacios: George's husband.
- Rafael Rosell as Paco Palacios: Sam's husband.
- Lovely Rivero as Vivian Trano
- Archie Alemania as Marcus Villa
- Kiel Rodriguez as Cairo
- Phi Palmos as DJ
- Brent Valdez as Peter
- Lotlot Bustamante as Angie
- Rikki Mae Davao as Rochelle "Rico"
- Melissa Avelino as Loray
- Arthur Solinap as Emil Royales

Guest cast

- Jong Cuenco as Orlando "Orly" Castillo
- William Lorenzo as Alberto "Bert" Balay
- Lianne Valentin as Beatrice "Bee" Royales
- Mike Tan as Inigo Morales / Antonio Berenguela
- Bianca Manalo as Beverly Maison
- Vaness del Moral as Hillary "Lary" Suarez
- Mariel Pamintuan as Juliet
- Carmina Villarroel as Barbara "Barry" Sagrado-Dee
- Jo Berry as Lilet Matias
- Victor Silayan as Rodolfo Palacios / Soledad Palacios

== Episodes ==
Widows' War episodes
No.	Title	Original release date
1	TBA	July 1, 2024
2	"Friendship Over"	July 2, 2024
3	TBA	July 3, 2024
4	TBA	July 4, 2024
5	TBA	July 5, 2024
6	TBA	July 8, 2024
7	TBA	July 9, 2024
8	TBA	July 10, 2024
9	TBA	July 11, 2024
10	TBA	July 12, 2024
11	TBA	July 15, 2024
12	TBA	July 16, 2024
13	TBA	July 17, 2024
14	"Restless Soul"	July 18, 2024
15	TBA	July 19, 2024
16	TBA	July 22, 2024
17	"Death Threat"	July 23, 2024
18	TBA	July 24, 2024
19	TBA	July 25, 2024
20	"Descent to Madness"	July 26, 2024
21	"Sam is Pregnant"	July 29, 2024
22	TBA	July 30, 2024
23	TBA	July 31, 2024
24	"RIP, Basil"	August 1, 2024
25	TBA	August 2, 2024
26	"Untold Secrets"	August 5, 2024
27	TBA	August 6, 2024
28	TBA	August 7, 2024
29	TBA	August 8, 2024
30	"Suspect Arrested"	August 9, 2024
31	"Farewell, Basil"	August 12, 2024
32	TBA	August 13, 2024
33	TBA	August 14, 2024
34	TBA	August 15, 2024
35	TBA	August 16, 2024
36	"Gender Reveal"	August 19, 2024
37	"Poor George"	August 20, 2024
38	TBA	August 21, 2024
39	"Killer on the Loose"	August 22, 2024
40	TBA	August 23, 2024
41	"Killer in the Palace"	August 26, 2024
42	TBA	August 27, 2024
43	"Escaping Death"	August 28, 2024
44	"Murder Alibi"	August 29, 2024
45	"Murder Weapon"	August 30, 2024
46	TBA	September 2, 2024
47	TBA	September 3, 2024
48	"Desperate Measures"	September 4, 2024
49	"Palacios' Impostor"	September 5, 2024
50	"Deception"	September 6, 2024
51	TBA	September 9, 2024
52	"Palacios' Serial Killer"	September 10, 2024
53	TBA	September 11, 2024
54	TBA	September 12, 2024
55	TBA	September 13, 2024
56	TBA	September 16, 2024
57	"On Bended Knee"	September 17, 2024
58	TBA	September 18, 2024
59	TBA	September 19, 2024
60	TBA	September 20, 2024
61	TBA	September 23, 2024
62	TBA	September 24, 2024
63	"Vivian's Karma"	September 25, 2024
64	TBA	September 26, 2024
65	"George, the Accused"	September 27, 2024
66	"George is Pregnant"	September 30, 2024
67	TBA	October 1, 2024
68	TBA	October 2, 2024
69	"Blackmail Video"	October 3, 2024
70	"Finding Basil's Phone"	October 4, 2024
71	"Sam's Confession"	October 7, 2024
72	"Punishment"	October 8, 2024
73	"Chaos"	October 9, 2024

== Development ==
The series was announced by GMA Network on January 1, 2024, set in the shared universe with television crime drama series – Widows' Web (2022) and Royal Blood (2023).

=== Casting ===
Philippine actresses Bea Alonzo, Carla Abellana and Gabbi Garcia were announced on January 1, 2024 to headline the series. In the same month, Garcia left the series due to scheduling conflicts. Actress Jean Garcia served as her replacement. On January 23, 2024, during the series' story conference and script reading, several cast members were announced, including actor Mark Herras. Actor James Graham and actress Charlie Fleming both joined the series as regular cast members, portraying the same character they played in Royal Blood. In July 2024, actress Lianne Valentin reprised her role in Royal Blood as Beatrice Royales. In September 2024, actress Vaness del Moral and actor Arthur Solinap both reprised their respective roles in Widows' Web and Royal Blood. In November 2024, actress Carmina Villarroel made a guest appearance in the series, reprising her role as Barbara Sagrado-Dee in Widows' Web. Cast member from the television legal drama series, Lilet Matias: Attorney-at-Law – Jo Berry appeared in Widows' War, in her respective role.

== Production ==
Principal photography commenced on February 23, 2024. Filming of the series took place in Bataan, Batangas and La Union.

== Reception ==
=== Ratings ===
According to AGB Nielsen Philippines' Nationwide Urban Television Audience Measurement People in television homes, the pilot episode of Widows' War earned an 8.9% rating. The final episode scored a 9.2% rating. The series had its highest rating on July 19, 2024 with a 12.3% rating.

=== Critical response ===
Jerry Donato of The Philippine Star, stated the series is "well-thought with its characters and concept, and has a meticulously crafted story, which is executed properly by the cast and the director." Donato also complimented the work of actors Rafael Rosell and Benjamin Alves, and actress Bianca Manalo.

== Accolades ==
Accolades received by Widows' War
Year	Award	Category	Recipient	Result	Ref.
2025	36th PMPC Star Awards for Television	Best Drama Actress	Bea Alonzo	Nominated	
2025	36th PMPC Star Awards for Television	Best New Male TV Personality	Matthew Uy	Nominated	
2025	36th PMPC Star Awards for Television	Best Primetime TV Series	Widows' War	Nominated	

== Legacy ==
In December 2024, actresses Jean Garcia and Rita Daniela both appeared in the Philippine television legal drama series, Lilet Matias: Attorney-at-Law in a guest role, portraying the same character they played in Widows' War.
