= Ysabel Ortega =

Filipino actress (born 1999)

- Ortega at San Diego Comic-Con in 2023
- Born: Maria Ysabel Ortega Lapid; January 25, 1999 (age 27); Laoag, Ilocos Norte, Philippines
- Education: University of Asia and the Pacific (AB)
- Occupation: Actress
- Years active: 2014–present
- Agents: Star Magic (2014–2019); Sparkle (2019–present)
- Known for: Pusong Ligaw; Voltes V: Legacy
- Father: Lito Lapid
- Relatives: Mark Lapid (half-brother); Jess Lapid (granduncle); Jess Lapid Jr. (uncle); Bobby Ortega (grandfather); Francisco Ortega (great-grandfather)
- Family: Ortega

Maria Ysabel Ortega Lapid (Tagalog: [ʔɪsaˈbɛl oɾˈtɛga]; born January 25, 1999) is a Filipino actress. She gained prominence playing Charlotte "Charlie" Quiñones on Pusong Ligaw (2017–2018). Ortega also appeared in several other television shows, such as On the Wings of Love (2015–2016), Maalaala Mo Kaya (2016–2017), Ipaglaban Mo! (2018), and Born for You (2016).

After four years with ABS-CBN, she transferred to GMA Network and played Jamie Robinson on Voltes V: Legacy (2023), the Filipino live-action adaptation of the Japanese animated series Voltes V.

== Early life and education ==
Maria Ysabel Ortega Lapid was born on January 25, 1999 in Laoag, Ilocos Norte, to actor and senator Lito Lapid and former singer-actress and former DSWD assistant secretary Michelle Ortega. She is a niece of actor Robert Ortega through her mother.

Ortega's mother, Michelle, married police director Gregorio "Greg" Pimentel, a director-general of the Philippine Drug Enforcement Agency and a former head of the police directorate for intelligence in 2018.

Ortega studied at Colegio San Agustin and graduated from high school at Reedley International School in 2016. She graduated with a degree in political economy from the University of Asia and the Pacific in 2021, having already pursued an acting career while studying in college. She initially enrolled in law school after graduating from college, but dropped out to focus on her acting career.

== Career ==
Ortega first appeared as a main villain in Born for You, and then played supporting roles in On the Wings of Love, Maalaala Mo Kaya, and others.

Ortega also played a villainous and obsessed character again as the main antagonist Charlotte "Charlie" in Pusong Ligaw, and she became well known because of that role.

Later, she became one of the main cast of Araw Gabi as Nica Marcelo. In 2019, she moved to GMA Network. Her first television series with GMA Network was the drama series The Gift where she played the role of Sabina Marcelino.

In 2020, she bagged the main role of Jamie Robinson in the live-action adaptation of the hit anime series, Voltes V: Legacy. She did a lot of research and training for Muay Thai, Kick-boxing and Mixed-martial arts before auditioning and securing the role of Jamie in the series. In 2023, She also joined the rest of the cast for the debut of live-action anime series Voltes V Legacy at San Diego Comic-Con in California.

In December 2023, she was cast in the award-winning movie Firefly , directed by Zig Dulay. The movie was an official entry of GMA Network to the 49th Metro Manila Film Festival and won for Best Picture award. For playing the role of Erika, she was nominated and won the New Movie Actress Award at the 2024 PMPC Star Awards for Movies.

== Other ventures ==
=== Business ===
In 2021, Ortega's family owns a farmland with a chicken farm and a lemon plantation with thousands of trees located in La Union.

In 2023, she and her Voltes V: Legacy co-stars and friends Elle Villanueva and Sofia Senoron became business partners and launched their own franchise of Nailandia, a nail spa located in Quezon City. Ortega opened her bakery business, Maria Ysabel Cakes and Pastries with her mother, Michelle Ortega as business partner which is also located in Quezon City.

== Personal life ==
Ortega and her Voltes V: Legacy and Firefly co-star Miguel Tanfelix confirmed their relationship on Fast Talk with Boy Abunda in December 2023.

== Filmography ==
=== Film ===
Year	Title	Role	Ref.
2023	Voltes V: Legacy - The Cinematic Experience	Jamie Robinson	
2023	Firefly	Erika	
2025	Kontrabida Academy	Mirinisa	
2025	Shake, Rattle & Roll: Evil Origins	Hermana Rita	

=== Television ===
Year	Title	Role	Ref.
2015–2016	On the Wings of Love	Angela Stevens-Fausto	
2015–2019	ASAP	Herself / Performer / Co-host	
2016	Born for You	Niña	
2016	Maalaala Mo Kaya: Motorsiklo	Ronnie's sister	
2017	Maalaala Mo Kaya: Laptop	Aiza	
2017–2018	Pusong Ligaw	Charlotte "Charlie" Quiñones	
2018	Ipaglaban Mo: Daya	Yumi	
2018	Precious Hearts Romances Presents: Araw Gabi	Veronica "Nica" Marcelo	
2019	Studio 7	Herself / Performer	
2019	Maynila: Back to One	Young Cristina	
2019	Pepito Manaloto	Tina	
2019–2020	The Gift	Sabina Marcelino	
2021	Daddy's Gurl	Britney B	
2021–present	All-Out Sundays	Performer / Co-host	
2022	What We Could Be	Cynthia Macaraeg	
2023	Voltes V: Legacy	Jamie Robinson	
2024	Regal Studio Presents: Love in the Rearview Mirror	Ella	
2024	Regal Studio Presents: Talking Ted	Liezel	
2024	Magpakailanman: Ang Nanay Kong Adik: The Judie Anne Picoc Story	Judie	
2024–present	It's Showtime	Herself / Performer	
2025	Slay	Yana Chua	
2025–2026	Encantadia Chronicles: Sang'gre	Sang'gre Armea	

== Awards and recognition ==
Award giving body	Year	Category	Nominee / Work	Result	Ref.
PMPC Star Awards for Television	2016	Best New Female TV Personality	Born for You	Nominated	
PMPC Star Awards for Movie	2024	New Movie Actress of the Year	Firefly	Won	
PMPC Star Awards for Movie	2024	Movie Loveteam of the Year	Ysabel Ortega and Miguel Tanfelix	Nominated	
