= Makiling (TV series) =

2024 Philippine television drama series

- Title card
- Genre: Drama thriller
- Created by: Aeious Asin; Reign Loleng
- Written by: Clarissa Estuar-Navarro
- Directed by: Conrado Delgado Peru
- Starring: Elle Villanueva
- Theme music composer: Rina Mercado
- Opening theme: "Dapat Ba?" by Crystal Paras
- Country of origin: Philippines
- Original language: Tagalog
- No. of episodes: 83

Production
- Executive producers: Rochelle Ann F. Marcelo; Nikki Del Mundo-Austria; Karl Perry G. Laylo
- Production location: Mount Makiling
- Cinematography: Alejo Nacua
- Camera setup: Multiple-camera setup
- Running time: 18–26 minutes
- Production company: GMA Public Affairs

Original release
- Network: GMA Network
- Release: January 8 – May 3, 2024

Makiling is a 2024 Philippine television drama thriller series broadcast by GMA Network. Directed by Conrado Delgado Peru, it stars Elle Villanueva. It premiered on January 8, 2024 on the network's Afternoon Prime line up. The series concluded on May 3, 2024, with a total of 83 episodes.

The series is streaming online on YouTube.

== Premise ==
Amira is a provincial girl who struggles to pay the debt of her family. Working in Manila, she will encounter a group of powerful and rich people, who will bully her and lead her to a near-death experience. She will later seek justice and take revenge for the things she believe in.

== Cast and characters ==
Lead cast

- Elle Villanueva as Amira Lirio

Supporting cast

- Derrick Monasterio as Alexander "Alex" Delos Santos
- Thea Tolentino as Rosario "Rose" Lirio/ Terra
- Kristoffer Martin as Sebastian "Seb" S. Terra
- Myrtle Sarrosa as Portia S. Terra
- Royce Cabrera as Renato "Ren" Ibarrola
- Teejay Marquez as Oliver Vergel
- Claire Castro as Maxine Romano-Terra
- Mon Confiado as Franco Terra
- Andrea Del Rosario as Natalie Salamanca-Terra
- Lui Manansala as Isidra "Ising" Lirio
- Richard Quan as Luisito "Luis" Delos Santos
- Bernadette Allyson as Evelyn "Belen" Delos Santos
- Soliman Cruz as Tirso
- Ian de Leon as Santiago "Santi" Ibarrola
- Rabiya Mateo as Maria Makiling
- Lotlot de Leon as Magnolia
- Pekto as Ernesto "Estong"
- Donna Cariaga as Emilia "Emily" Salvacion
- Brent Valdez as Bartolome "Bart"
- Alex Medina as Neil Damban
- Pepita Curtis as Astrovenus "Venus"
- Mark Dionisio as Tempo
- James Graham as Popoy
- Yvette Sanchez as Catherine "Cathy"

Recurring cast

- Jan Marini as Nora Asero
- Baninay Bautista as Rebecca "Bekang"
- Mosang as a barangay captain
- Patani Daño as Petra
- Sebreenika Santos as Jewel Ann R. Terra

Guest cast

- Cris Villanueva as Crisanto Lirio
- Sue Prado as Elena Lirio
- Ramon Christopher Gutierrez as Theodore Vergel
- Rufa Mae Quinto as Grace
- Manny Castañeda as Manuel "Manny"
- Pauline Mendoza as Bianca Mallari
- Nathaniel Enaje as younger Popoy
- Ramon Innocencio as Robert Dumalios
- Mike Lloren as Victor
- Rubi Rubi as Mushka
- Jay Arcilla as Ventanilla
- Faye Lorenzo as Pamela
- Jenine Desiderio as Vilma Vergel
- Migs Villasis as Matthew
- BJ Forbes as Errol

== Episodes ==
Makiling episodes
No.	Title	Original release date
1	"Pilot"	January 8, 2024
2	"Todo Na" (transl. max now)	January 9, 2024
3	"Rose"	January 10, 2024
4	"Crazy"	January 11, 2024
5	"Mutya"	January 12, 2024
6	"Makiling is Coming"	January 15, 2024
7	"Stalker"	January 16, 2024
8	"Bardagulan" (transl. brawl)	January 17, 2024
9	"Shampoo"	January 18, 2024
10	"Jungle Girl"	January 19, 2024
11	"Scandal"	January 22, 2024
12	"Sakit! Ang Init!" (transl. hurt! it's hot!)	January 23, 2024
13	"Makiling Me Softly"	January 24, 2024
14	"Bully"	January 25, 2024
15	"Hostage"	January 26, 2024
16	"Putok" (transl. erupt)	January 29, 2024
17	"Kulong" (transl. jail)	January 30, 2024
18	"Kidnap"	January 31, 2024
19	"Lapa" (transl. yard)	February 1, 2024
20	"Ahas" (transl. snake)	February 2, 2024
21	"Sagad" (transl. maximum)	February 5, 2024
22	"Laban" (transl. fight)	February 6, 2024
23	"Natira" (transl. remained)	February 7, 2024
24	"Sunog" (transl. fire)	February 8, 2024
25	"Burol" (transl. wake)	February 9, 2024
26	"Buking" (transl. exposed)	February 12, 2024
27	"Epic Fail"	February 13, 2024
28	"Impakta" (transl. evil spirit)	February 14, 2024
29	"Super Crazy"	February 15, 2024
30	"Comeback"	February 16, 2024
31	"Amira and Max Win"	February 19, 2024
32	"Makiling Them Softly"	February 20, 2024
33	"Dukutan Na" (transl. abduction now)	February 21, 2024
34	"Tira Terra" (transl. strike Terra)	February 22, 2024
35	"Titig Malagkit" (transl. stare sticky)	February 23, 2024
36	"Baby, Kalma" (transl. baby, calm)	February 26, 2024
37	"Puputok Na" (transl. exploding now)	February 27, 2024
38	"Amira Alter"	February 28, 2024
39	"Black Maria"	February 29, 2024
40	"Landi Ka, Sis!" (transl. you flirt, sis!)	March 1, 2024
41	"Lason" (transl. poison)	March 4, 2024
42	"Duda Honor" (transl. doubt honor)	March 5, 2024
43	"Padukot" (transl. abduction)	March 6, 2024
44	"Torture"	March 7, 2024
45	"Check-in"	March 8, 2024
46	"Deep Truth"	March 11, 2024
47	"Naputukan" (transl. exploded)	March 12, 2024
48	"Makiling Of Course, Palaban!" (transl. Makiling of course, fighter!)	March 13, 2024
49	"Guns and Roses"	March 14, 2024
50	"Kakampi" (transl. ally)	March 15, 2024
51	"Ikot-ikot" (transl. round and round)	March 18, 2024
52	"Bye, Portia"	March 19, 2024
53	"Buking Na" (transl. already exposed)	March 20, 2024
54	"Baligtaran" (transl. reversing)	March 21, 2024
55	"Arestado" (transl. arrested)	March 22, 2024
56	"Parusa" (transl. punishment)	March 25, 2024
57	"Tika Lang" (transl. just wait)	March 26, 2024
58	"Kampon" (transl. disciple)	March 27, 2024
59	"Aminin" (transl. admit it)	April 1, 2024
60	"Sakit, Sis" (transl. painful, sis)	April 2, 2024
61	"Terrahin Mo!" (transl. you strike!	April 3, 2024
62	"Lapain Mo" (transl. you butcher)	April 4, 2024
63	"Patay Ka, Ren!" (transl. you are dead, Ren!)	April 5, 2024
64	"Santi Baby"	April 8, 2024
65	"Craziest"	April 9, 2024
66	"Sorry"	April 10, 2024
67	"Killer"	April 11, 2024
68	"Muling Ibalik" (transl. bring back again)	April 12, 2024
69	"Mahal-mahalan" (transl. pretend love)	April 15, 2024
70	"Jewel"	April 16, 2024
71	"Rose Lanta" (transl. rose withered)	April 17, 2024
72	"DNA"	April 18, 2024
73	"Sino ang Ama?" (transl. who is the father?)	April 19, 2024
74	"Who's Your Daddy?"	April 22, 2024
75	"Wedding"	April 23, 2024
76	"Itigil ang Kasal!" (transl. stop the wedding!)	April 24, 2024
77	"Truth Hurts"	April 25, 2024
78	"Anong Fake Mo?" (transl. what's your fake?)	April 26, 2024
79	"Terrahin Lahat" (transl. attack all)	April 29, 2024
80	"Materra Matibay" (transl. may the toughest win)	April 30, 2024
81	"Ganting Ganti" (transl. desperate for revenge)	May 1, 2024
82	"Sagad Na" (transl. maxed out)	May 2, 2024
83	"Gigil Finale" (transl. trembling finale)	May 3, 2024

== Production ==
Principal photography commenced in October 2023. Filming concluded on April 16, 2024.

== Ratings ==
According to AGB Nielsen Philippines' Nationwide Urban Television Audience Measurement People in television homes, the pilot episode of Makiling earned a 6.5% rating. The final episode scored an 8.3% rating.

== Accolades ==
Accolades received by Makiling
Year	Award	Category	Recipient	Result	Ref.
2025	36th PMPC Star Awards for Television	Best Daytime TV Series	Makiling	Pending	
