= A Very Special Love (film series) =

- Directed by: Cathy Garcia Molina
- Written by: Raz de la Torre; Carmi Raymundo
- Produced by: Charo Santos-Concio; Malou Santos; Vic del Rosario Jr.
- Starring: John Lloyd Cruz; Sarah Geronimo
- Cinematography: Manuel Teehankee
- Edited by: Marya Ignacio
- Music by: Jessie Lasaten; Michael Lloyd
- Production companies: ABS-CBN Film Productions; Viva Films
- Distributed by: Star Cinema; Viva Films
- Release dates: July 30, 2008 (1); February 25, 2009 (2); March 30, 2013 (3)
- Country: Philippines
- Language: Filipino

A Very Special Love is a 2008 Filipino romantic comedy film trilogy produced by Star Cinema and Viva Films. With A Very Special Love as the first film in the series, it became a huge box office success, leading the producers to create the final two installments You Changed My Life (2009) and It Takes a Man and a Woman (2013). John Lloyd Cruz and Sarah Geronimo starred in the trilogy while Cathy Garcia Molina directed all three films; A Very Special Love was dubbed the most successful Filipino romantic film series of all time.

== Films ==
=== A Very Special Love (2008) ===
Laida Magtalas is a modern-day Belle. "Miggy" is the youngest member of the Montenegro clan – a well-established family in the business world. She applies as an Editorial Assistant at Miggy's newly launched men's magazine, "Bachelor". Laida revels working in such close proximity with the man of her dreams. The film opens with Laida starting out her day for a job interview with Flippage, owned and manage by her crush Miguel "Miggy" Montenegro. Unbeknownst to her, on the day of her interview, Miggy was having a heated meeting with his creative team on the issue of the Bachelor, Flippage's men's magazine. Miggy's mean demeanor and undermining of both his friend and editors cause a walkout of half of the team. In the middle of the chaos Laida was hired on the spot after she presented Miggy with coffee left by an attendant who also walked out after being screamed at. By some stroke of luck, Laida lands the job. Laida remains blinded to the fact that the Miggy of her dreams is very different from the real one. In reality, he is an unapologetic, hothead who always thinks he's in the right and obsesses about nothing making his magazine number one. Everyone is scared of him with the exception of the love-stuck Laida, who adamantly defends him. Imperceptively, she caters to his every whim, even sending her in his absence on a date with his girlfriend, breaking her heart a little. Her colleagues question her unrelenting devotion to such a monster and when Laida continues to proves her loyalty to Miggy, gossip regarding her feelings for the boss starts to circulate. However the moment was short lived, as the next day after Laida made a suggestion in regards to an article content that Miggy should put for the magazine, Miggy publicly humiliates her and her knowledge of sex and questioned her virtue (virginity) in front of the staff by making her say the word “Sex”. Miggy was later embarrassed himself after he realized that it was Laida who made the last minute call and effort to find a printing press to do a rush job on their magazines overhaul. After being chastised by the despotic Miggy, Laida finally opens her eyes and sees him for the tyrant he truly is. The confrontation with Laida was a rude awakening for Miggy as well and he realizes why people are so put off by him. Miggy then tries with much difficulty on his part of apologizing in his own way to Laida. First by ordering pizza for the team and serving a slice himself to her, which Laida ignores. Laida, now disenchanted with Miggy was called in by her work. However upon arriving in Miggy's apartment, she found him high with fever with very little food or necessities in his apartment, with no househelp or family to care for him. Laida took care of Miggy, missing her own mother's birthday. Miggy woke up during a break in fever and saw the exhausted Laida next to him patting his back as a mother would to a sick child. This prompted Miggy to realize his feelings for Laida, igniting a change in him and wishing her to be more closer to him as well as be more friendly with the rest of his team. The productivity and atmosphere of the company thus also changed on a positive note. Miggy then became comfortable enough to tell Laida the truth behind his past: that he was an illegitimate child of his father later adopted to the main family after his mother's death. Thus his strong desire to prove himself to his father and older brother was aroused in him. For the first time in his life, Miggy garners the gumption to apologize and this new-found humility opens up a whole new world of “firsts” for Miggy. With Laida's help, Miggy slowly learns to be more of a team player and experiences the true value of loyalty.

See also the single "Very Special Love" in the 1979 album by Maureen McGovern.

=== You Changed My Life (2009) ===
It has been six months since Laida Magtalas won the heart of her prince charming Miggy Montenegro and it has been nothing but good. Laida got promoted from executive assistant to editorial assistant, while Miggy has been doing well as he is being mentored by his older brother Art Montenegro. Laida gets an offer from her aunt in Canada where she is being given a good recommendation in order for her to work there. Miggy's father vouched for his promotion as general manager of the family's industrial laundry business in Laguna but this also prompted a few hesitations from Art. The promotion proved difficult for the couple's relationship as time was very constraint and the relationship suffers from the pressures of being apart. This is only aggravated by Macoy, who Miggy is jealous of, as they become close once again. Macoy is Laida's long time friend who she had a fall-out with when Macoy did not keep his promise to her by going to the same college. Things went further haywire when Miggy had to fix a few issues in the plant when he accepted orders from his brother Art's ex-girlfriend, Christina. Her company's demand volume was too much for their man-power thus making some workers unhappy which lead to a labour strike. His father stepped in and help resolve the issue but Miggy had to set expectations to the clients affected by the strike. Those business meetings that preceded prompted Miggy to almost miss a wedding that Laida and him would go to. He got there late and saw Laida crying with Macoy beside her, emotions clashed between the two and they decided to cool off for the time being. The industrial laundry business soon was working in optimum efficiency which made his brother trust him more, to the point of having him take over the family telecom stake in China. In the Montenegro group of companies annual general meeting, Laida saw Miggy for the first time after the argument, laida simply said "Good Morning Sir", then left the venue right away. At the actual meeting, Miggy was announced as the officer in charge of the telecoms business. Macoy talked sense to Laida to go back and pursue Miggy. She met Miggy in the garden where she said she still loved him, Miggy suggested that it will be a more challenging time for them, but he also said he loved her. The two share a ten-second kiss which Laida times.

See also the single "You Changed My Life in a Moment" in the 1978 album Singer of Songs by Janie Fricke.

=== It Takes a Man and a Woman (2013) ===
The films follows the life of Miggy (John Lloyd Cruz) and Laida (Sarah Geronimo) after their break-up which occur after the events of the second film. Miggy is now in a relationship with Belle (Isabelle Daza) while Laida, on the other hand, becomes a fiercer woman after living in the United States. They attempt to co-exist in the same company; at the same time Laida tries to oppose Miggy's business decision.

See also the single "It Takes a Man and a Woman" in the 1978 album Pleasure Train by Teri DeSario.

== Reception ==
=== Box office ===
Film	Release date	Revenue	Domestic rank	Reference
A Very Special Love	July 30, 2008	₱179,235,324	9	
You Changed My Life	February 25, 2009	₱225,623,307	6	
It Takes a Man and a Woman	March 30, 2013	₱405,258,082	1	

== Cast and characters ==
Character	Films		
Character	A Very Special Love	You Changed My Life	It Takes a Man and a Woman
Miggy Montenegro	John Lloyd Cruz	John Lloyd Cruz	John Lloyd Cruz
Laida Magtalas	Sarah Geronimo	Sarah Geronimo	Sarah Geronimo
Arturo Montenegro	Rowell Santiago	Rowell Santiago	Rowell Santiago
Tomas Magtalas	Al Tantay	Al Tantay	Al Tantay
Baby Magtalas	Irma Adlawan	Irma Adlawan	Irma Adlawan
Zoila	Matet de Leon	Matet de Leon	Matet de Leon
John Rae	Joross Gamboa	Joross Gamboa	Joross Gamboa
Vincent	Gio Alvarez	Gio Alvarez	Gio Alvarez
Luis Montenegro	Dante Rivero	Dante Rivero	Dante Rivero
Rose Magtalas	Miles Ocampo	Miles Ocampo	Miles Ocampo
Stephen Magtalas	Arno Morales	Arno Morales	Arno Morales
Marcelo "Macoy" Romero		Rayver Cruz	
Belle Laurel			Isabelle Daza

Note: A gray cell indicates character did not appear in that medium.
