= Arthur Solinap =

Filipino actor born 1980)

- Born: Arthur González Solinap; January 19, 1980 (age 46); Manila, Philippines
- Occupations: Model; actor
- Height: 182 cm (6 ft 0 in)
- Spouse: Rochelle Pangilinan (m. 2017)
- Children: 1
- Relatives: Michelle Solinap (sister): Paul Salas (nephew); Dingdong Dantes (cousin); Carlo Gonzales(cousin)

Arthur González Solinap (born January 19, 1980) is an actor and model from the Philippines. He is best known for his role as Robert in the television sitcom Pepito Manaloto (2010–present). Solinap began his entertainment career as a member of the dance group Abztract Dancers, alongside his cousin Dingdong Dantes. Solinap made his television debut in 2005 as Muros in Encantadia. He portrayed Diego in the 2007 series MariMar. More recently, he has appeared as police detective Emiliano "Emil" Banez in the drama-suspense series Widows' Web (2022) and its spin-off Royal Blood (2023), on GMA Network.

== Personal life ==
Solinap is married to actress Rochelle Pangilinan. They have one daughter together, Shiloh Jayne (born February 24, 2019).

== Filmography ==
=== Film ===
| Year | Title | Role |
|---|---|---|
| 1996 | Nasaan Ka Nang Kailangan Kita | Dancer |
| 1997 | Kulayan Natin Ang Bukas | |
| 2005 | Mulawin: The Movie | Muros |
| 2006 | Eternity | Demetrio |
| 2007 | Enteng Kabisote 4: Okay Ka Fairy Ko...The Beginning of the Legend | Blasting Man |
| 2009 | Mano Po 6: A Mother's Love | Emil |
| 2013 | Pedro Calungsod: Batang Martir | Padre Luis de Medina |
| 2017 | Trip Ubusan: The Lolas vs. Zombies | Jordan |
| 2017 | High Tide | Tibor |
| 2019 | Sunod | Jess Chavez |

=== Television ===
| Year | Title | Role | Note(s) |
|---|---|---|---|
| 2005 | Love to Love | | |
| 2005 | Encantadia | Muros | |
| 2005–2006 | Etheria: Ang Ikalimang Kaharian ng Encantadia | Muros | |
| 2006 | Encantadia: Pag-ibig Hanggang Wakas | Muros | |
| 2006 | Atlantika | Eno | |
| 2007 | Daisy Siete | George | Episode: "Isla Chikita" |
| 2007 | Mga Kuwento ni Lola Basyang | Prinsipe Kael | Episode: "Ang Prinsipeng Mahaba Ang Ilong" |
| 2007–2008 | Marimar | Diego | |
| 2008 | Daisy Siete | Arthur | Episode: "Prince Charming af the Seven Maids" |
| 2008 | Babangon Ako't Dudurugin Kita | Harry | |
| 2008 | Ako si Kim Samsoon | Kris | |
| 2008–2009 | Gagambino | Killer | |
| 2009 | Daisy Siete | Danny | Episode: "Kambalilong" |
| 2009 | Daisy Siete | Marcon | Episode: "Cha Cha Muchacha" |
| 2009 | Ikaw Sana | Dave | |
| 2010–present | Pepito Manaloto | Robert Maceda | |
| 2010 | Anghel sa Lupa: An APT Entertainment Lenten Drama Special | Edward | |
| 2010 | Take Me Out | Himself | |
| 2010 | Ilumina | Carpio | |
| 2010 | Jillian: Namamasko Po | Himself | |
| 2011 | I Heart You, Pare! | Chong | |
| 2011 | Survivor Philippines: Celebrity Doubles Showdown | Himself | |
| 2012 | Legacy | Quintin | |
| 2013 | Home Sweet Home | Kulas | |
| 2013 | Kahit Nasaan Ka Man | Luis Castillo | |
| 2014 | Ang Lihim ni Annasandra | Kenneth | |
| 2016 | Maynila: Turning Japanese | None | |
| 2016 | Wish I May | Carlos | |
| 2016 | Oh My Mama | Rick Rosales | |
| 2016 | Love is... | Michael | |
| 2018 | Ang Forever Ko'y Ikaw | Mario | |
| 2019 | Kara Mia | Alex Lacson | |
| 2019 | One of the Baes | Rudolph Po | |
| 2021 | I Can See You: The Lookout | Randy Penuliar | |
| 2022 | Widows' Web | Emiliano 'Emil' Bañez | |
| 2023 | Royal Blood | Emiliano 'Emil' Bañez / Emiliano 'Yano' Royales | |
| 2024 | Widows' War | Emiliano 'Emil' Royales | |
| 2025 | Sanggang-Dikit FR | Carlo Manalo | |
