= Royal Blood (TV series) =

2023 Philippine television drama series

- Title card
- Genre: Crime drama; Mystery
- Created by: R.J. Nuevas; Ken de Leon
- Written by: Glaiza Ramirez; Jimuel Dela Cruz; Abner Tulagan; Louize Al-Sheri
- Directed by: Dominic Zapata
- Creative director: Aloy Adlawan
- Starring: Dingdong Dantes
- Country of origin: Philippines
- Original language: Tagalog
- No. of episodes: 70

Production
- Executive producer: Winnie Hollis-Reyes
- Production location: Metro Manila
- Cinematography: Roman Theodossis
- Editors: Benedict Lavastida; Noel Mauricio
- Camera setup: Multiple-camera setup
- Running time: 26 minutes
- Production company: GMA Entertainment Group

Original release
- Network: GMA Network
- Release: June 19 – September 22, 2023

Royal Blood is a 2023 Philippine television drama crime mystery series broadcast by GMA Network. Directed by Dominic Zapata, it stars Dingdong Dantes. It premiered on June 19, 2023 on the network's Telebabad line up. The series concluded on September 22, 2023, with a total of 70 episodes.

The series is streaming online on YouTube.

== Premise ==
When a death occurs in the Royales family, it leads to the investigation of the estranged son, Napoy. He seeks help from a former NBI agent and his son.

== Cast and characters ==
Cast

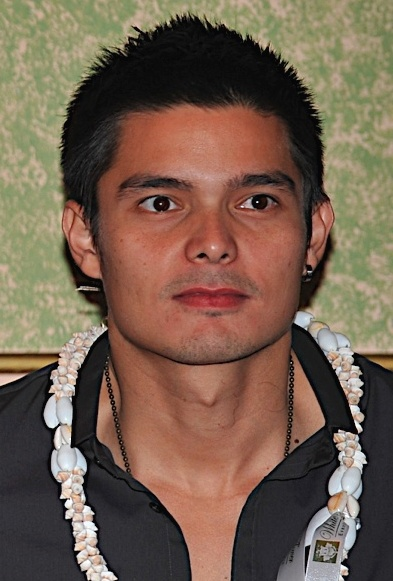
Dingdong Dantes

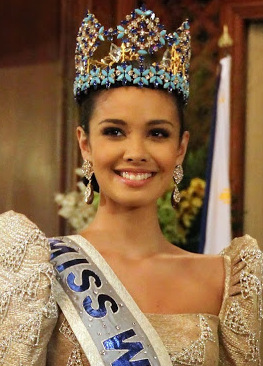
Megan Young

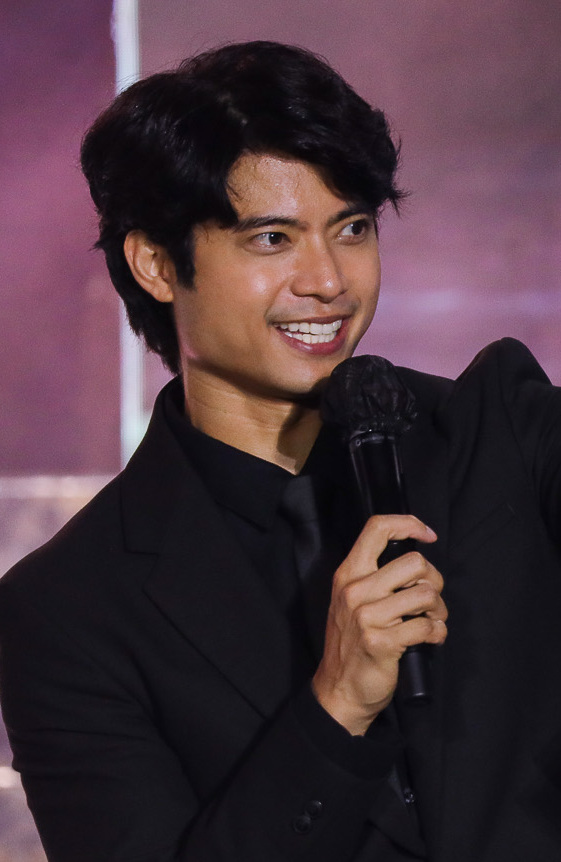
Mikael Daez

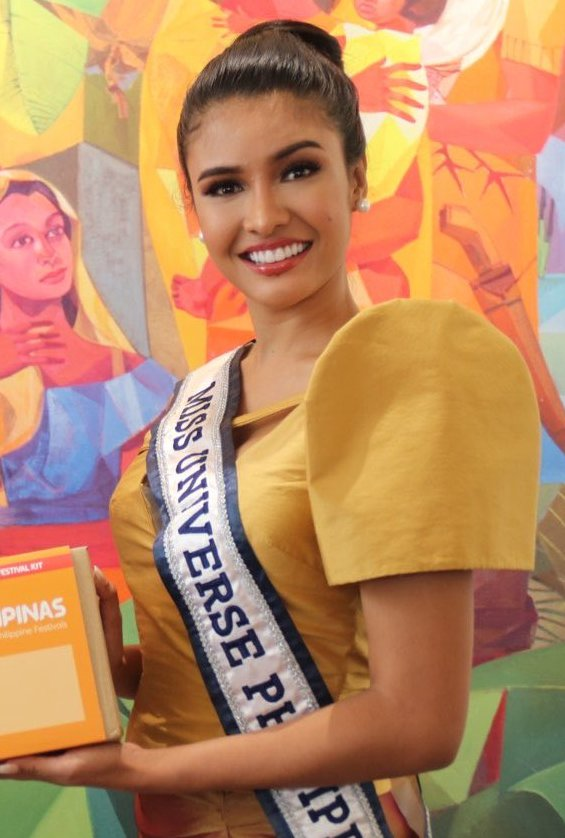
Rabiya Mateo

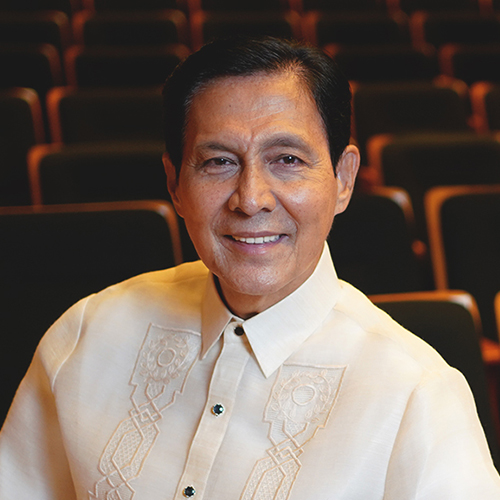
Tirso Cruz III

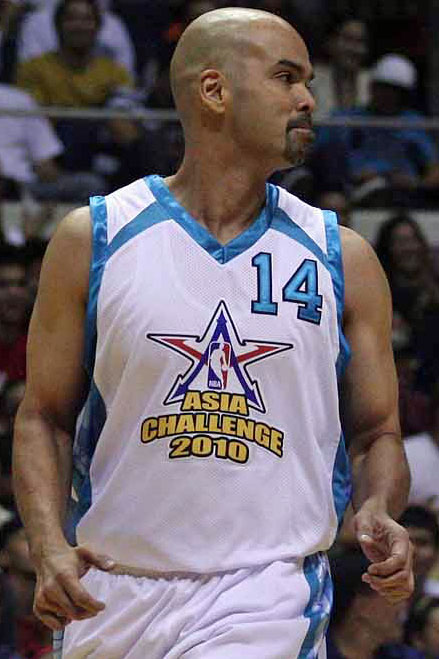
Benjie Paras

Lead cast

- Dingdong Dantes as Napoleon "Napoy" Terrazo Royales

Supporting cast

- Megan Young as Diana Royales
- Mikael Daez as Kristoff Royales
- Dion Ignacio as Andrew Castor
- Lianne Valentin as Beatrice "Bee" Royales
- Rabiya Mateo as Tasha
- Rhian Ramos as Margaret Royales-Castor
- Tirso Cruz III as Gustavo Royales
- Ces Quesada as Cleofe
- Carmen Soriano as Camilla
- Benjie Paras as Otep
- Arthur Solinap as Emiliano "Emil" Bañez / Emiliano "Yano" Royales
- Aidan Veneracion as Archie Royales
- Sienna Stevens as Elizabeth "Lizzie" Terrazo
- Princess Aliyah as Anne
- James Graham as Louie Castor

Recurring cast

- Divine Tetay as Peachy
- Mel Kimura as Marta
- Moi Bien as Jenny
- Melissa Avelino as Loray
- Andrew Schimmer as Lemuel
- John Feir as Gerald
- Patani Daño as Loida
- Andrew Gan as Ryan San Diego
- Ge Villamil as Queenie Masangkay
- Chamyto as Jazz
- Bem Sabanal as Arona Santiago

Guest cast

- Vaness del Moral as Hillary Pelaez-Suarez
- Anna Marin as Victoria Royales
- Ashley Ortega as Jacqueline "Jackie" Antonio-Mabantog
- Charlie Fleming as Sofia Trano
- Migs Villasis as Efren Oyos
- Mark Dionisio as Liaban
- Haley Dizon as Sarah Oquendo
- Jillian Ward as Analyn Santos

== Casting ==
In March 2023, the cast of the series was announced. Actor Arthur Solinap joined the series as a regular cast member, portraying the same character he played in the 2022 Philippine television crime drama series Widows' Web. Actresses Vaness del Moral and Ashley Ortega also reprised their respective role in Widows' Web, as friends of the Royales clan in the series. In September 2023, actress Jillian Ward made a cameo appearance as Lizzie Terrazo's doctor, Analyn Santos, who originated from the Philippine television medical drama series Abot-Kamay na Pangarap.

== Production ==
Principal photography commenced on April 12, 2023. Filming concluded on September 13, 2023.

== Ratings ==
According to AGB Nielsen Philippines' Nationwide Urban Television Audience Measurement People in television homes, the pilot episode of Royal Blood earned a 9.8% rating.

== Accolades ==
Accolades received by Royal Blood
Year	Award	Category	Recipient	Result	Ref.
2024	Platinum Stallion National Media Awards	Best Primetime Drama Series	Royal Blood	Won	
2024	Platinum Stallion National Media Awards	Best Primetime Drama Actress	Rhian Ramos	Won	
2024	5th VP Choice Awards	TV Actor of the Year (Primetime)	Dingdong Dantes	Nominated	
2024	5th VP Choice Awards	TV Supporting Actor of the Year	Mikael Daez	Nominated	
2024	5th VP Choice Awards	TV Supporting Actress of the Year	Rabiya Mateo	Nominated	
2024	Seoul International Drama Awards	Best Drama	Royal Blood	Nominated	
2024	ContentAsia Awards	Best Male Lead in a TV Programme	Dingdong Dantes	Nominated	
2024	4th TAG Awards Chicago	Best Actress	Rhian Ramos	Won	
2025	37th PMPC Star Awards for Television	Best Primetime Drama Series	Royal Blood	Nominated	
2025	37th PMPC Star Awards for Television	Best Drama Actor	Dingdong Dantes	Nominated	
2025	37th PMPC Star Awards for Television	Best Drama Actress	Rhian Ramos	Won	
2025	37th PMPC Star Awards for Television	Best New Male TV Personality	Aidan Veneracion	Nominated	
2025	37th PMPC Star Awards for Television	Best New Female TV Personality	Charlie Fleming	Nominated	

== Legacy ==
Actor James Graham and actress Charlie Fleming both joined the 2024 Philippine television crime drama series Widows' War as regular cast members, portraying the same character they played in Royal Blood. In July 2024, actress Lianne Valentin reprised her role as Beatrice Royales in Widows' War. In September 2024, actor Arthur Solinap reprised his role as Emil Royales for Widows' War.
