= Widows' Web =

2022 Philippine television drama series

- Title card
- Genre: Crime drama
- Created by: John Kenneth de Leon
- Written by: Jimuel Dela Cruz; Anna Aleta Nadela
- Directed by: Jerry Lopez Sineneng
- Starring: Carmina Villarroel; Vaness del Moral; Ashley Ortega; Pauline Mendoza
- Country of origin: Philippines
- Original language: Tagalog
- No. of episodes: 43

Production
- Executive producer: Racquel Atienza-Cadsawan
- Production location: Metro Manila
- Camera setup: Multiple-camera setup
- Running time: 23–37 minutes
- Production company: GMA Entertainment Group

Original release
- Network: GMA Network
- Release: February 28 – April 29, 2022

Widows' Web is a 2022 Philippine television drama crime series broadcast by GMA Network. Directed by Jerry Lopez Sineneng, it stars Carmina Villarroel, Vaness del Moral, Ashley Ortega and Pauline Mendoza. It premiered on February 28, 2022 on the network's Telebabad line up. The series concluded on April 29, 2022, with a total of 43 episodes.

The series is streaming online on YouTube.

== Premise ==
Four women get caught in a series of lies and deception, following the murder of a rich businessman.

== Cast and characters ==
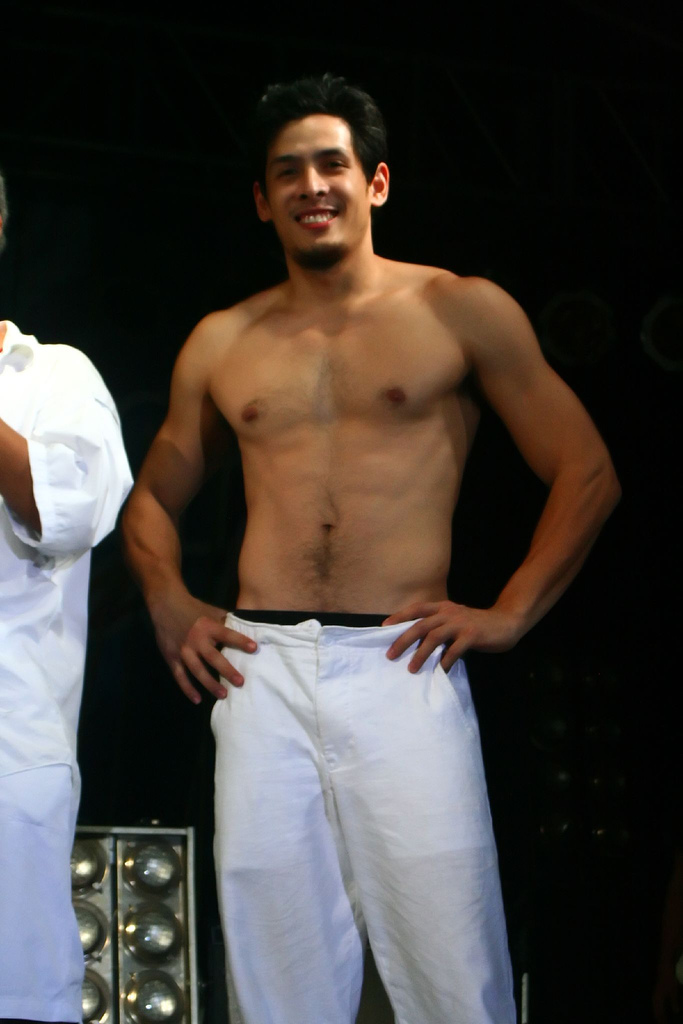
Christian Vasquez portrays Boris Tayuman.

Lead cast

- Carmina Villarroel as Barbara Sagrado-Dee, the "elegant and perfectionist" older sister of Alexander Sagrado III.
- Vaness del Moral as Hillary Pelaez-Suarez
- Pauline Mendoza as Elaine Innocencio-Querubin, a woman to solve the case of AS3's murder in order to prove her fiancé's innocence.
- Ashley Ortega as Jacqueline "Jackie" Antonio-Mabantog / Tisay

Supporting cast

- Bernard Palanca as William Suarez
- Adrian Alandy as Vladimir "Vlad" Mabantog Sagrado
- Edgar Allan Guzman as Frank Querubin
- Christian Vasquez as Boris Tayuman
- Allan Paule as Ramon Innocencio
- Tanya Gomez as Gloria Querubin
- Mosang as Delia Gonzales
- Arthur Solinap as Emiliano "Emil" Bañez
- Dave Bornea as Dwight de Guzman
- Neil Coleta as Julius Collado
- Mike Agassi as George Aguirre
- Karenina Haniel as Rose Punzalan
- Anjay Anson as Jed Sagrado Dee
- Vanessa Peña as Nikki Suarez

Guest cast

- Ryan Eigenmann as Alexander "Xander" Sagrado III
- Josh Ivan Morales as Simon Barcial

== Production ==
Principal photography commenced in December 2021.

== Ratings ==
According to AGB Nielsen Philippines' Nationwide Urban Television Audience Measurement People in television homes, the pilot episode of Widows' Web earned a 10.4% rating. The final episode scored a 12.2% rating.

== Legacy ==
Actor Arthur Solinap joined the 2023 Philippine television crime drama series, Royal Blood as a regular cast member, portraying the same character he played in Widows' Web. Actresses Vaness del Moral and Ashley Ortega also reprised their respective role as friends of the Royales clan in Royal Blood. In September 2024, del Moral and Solinap both appeared in the Philippine television crime drama series, Widows' War playing their respective character from the series. In November 2024, actress Carmina Villarroel appeared in a guest role, portraying the same character in Widows' Web.
