= Hearts on Ice =

2023 Philippine television drama series

- Title card
- Genre: Sports drama; Romance
- Created by: Des Garbes-Severino
- Developed by: Jojo Tawasil Nones; John Roque
- Written by: Liberty Trinidad-Villaroman; Marlon Miguel; Brylle Tabora; Louise Andrei Al-Sheri
- Directed by: Dominic Zapata
- Creative director: Aloy Adlawan
- Starring: Ashley Ortega; Xian Lim
- Theme music composer: Natasha Correos ("Never Stop Believin"); Simon Tan ("Tagumpay")
- Opening theme: "Never Stop Believin" by Crystal Paras
- Ending theme: "Tagumpay" by Hannah Precillas
- Country of origin: Philippines
- Original language: Tagalog
- No. of episodes: 68

Production
- Executive producer: Darling Pulido-Torres
- Production location: Metro Manila
- Camera setup: Multiple-camera setup
- Running time: 21–37 minutes
- Production company: GMA Entertainment Group

Original release
- Network: GMA Network
- Release: March 13 – June 16, 2023

Hearts on Ice is a 2023 Philippine television drama sports romance series broadcast by GMA Network. Directed by Dominic Zapata, it stars Ashley Ortega and Xian Lim. It premiered on March 13, 2023 on the network's Telebabad line up. The series concluded on June 16, 2023, with a total of 68 episodes.

The series is streaming online on YouTube.

== Cast and characters ==
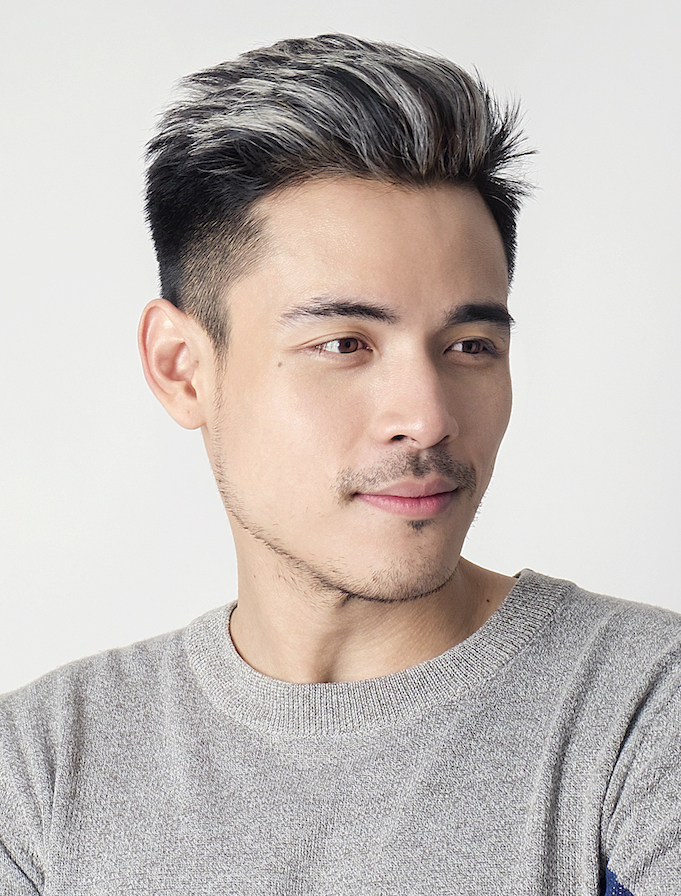
Xian Lim portrays Enzo Razon III.

Lead cast

- Ashley Ortega as Pauline "Ponggay" B. Campos
- Xian Lim as Lawrence "Enzo" Razon III

Supporting cast

- Amy Austria as Liberty "Libay" Bravo-Martinez
- Rita Avila as Yvanna Campos-Guidote
- Tonton Gutierrez as Gerald Campos
- Lito Pimentel as Ruben Martinez
- Ina Feleo as Wendy Martinez
- Cheska Iñigo as Vivian Razon-Campos
- Roxie Smith as Monique C. Guidote
- Skye Chua as Sonja Limjoco
- Kim Perez as Salvador "Bogs" Adriano
- Ruiz Gomez as Oliver Ramirez

Recurring cast

- Hannah Arguelles as Paris Razon
- Antonette Garcia as Janice
- Shuvee Etrata as Kring-Kring
- Dani Ozaraga as Jessa
- Lei Angela as Sunshine
- Ella Cristofani as Kimberly
- Felicity Eco as Ava
- Maritess Joaquin as Adora
- Issa Litton as Irene Limjoco
- Marcus Madrigal as Cedrick Limjoco
- Shanelle Agustin as Jill
- Sandro Muhlach as a Guy
- Michael Martinez as himself
- Jenzel Angeles as Patricia "Tricia"
- Carlo San Juan as Melvin
- Shemee Buenaobra as Judy
- Kelly Rows as Brittany
- Vanessa Peña as Alyssa

Guest cast

- Elle Villanueva as younger Libay
- Lianne Valentin as younger Yvanna
- Arhia Faye Agas as younger Ponggay
- Franchesco Maafi as younger Enzo
- Jon Lucas as younger Gerald
- Prince Clemente as younger Ruben

== Production ==
Principal photography commenced in January 2023. Filming concluded in May 2023.

== Ratings ==
According to AGB Nielsen Philippines' Nationwide Urban Television Audience Measurement People in television homes, the pilot episode of Hearts on Ice earned a 9.2% rating.
