= One Day, Isang Araw =

1988 action comedy film by Pablo Santiago

- Theatrical release poster
- Directed by: Pablo P. Santiago
- Screenplay by: Tony Pasena; Fred Navarro
- Story by: Jose Javier Reyes
- Produced by: Lily Monteverde
- Starring: Fernando Poe Jr.; Matet de Leon
- Cinematography: Ver P. Reyes
- Edited by: Augusto Salvador
- Music by: Jaime F. Fabregas
- Production company: Regal Films
- Distributed by: Regal Films
- Release date: August 18, 1988
- Country: Philippines
- Language: Filipino

One Day, Isang Araw (lit. 'One Day, One Day') is a 1988 Filipino action comedy film directed by Pablo Santiago and written by Tony Pasena and Fred Navarro from a story by Jose Javier Reyes. Starring Fernando Poe Jr., Matet de Leon, and Dawn Zulueta in her first lead role, the story follows a neighborhood hero who fights for the vulnerable street children.

Produced by Regal Films, the film was released theatrically on August 18, 1988, and was a box-office success.

== Cast ==
- Fernando Poe Jr.
- Matet de Leon as Precious/Purunggay
- Dawn Zulueta
- Dencio Padilla
- Paquito Diaz as Baldo
- Bayani Casimiro as Don Paquito, Purunggay's grandfather
- Odette Khan as Sophia
- Johnny Wilson as Brando
- Balot as a jeepney driver
- Malu de Guzman as Auntie
- Flora Gasser as yaya of Purunggay
- Larry Silva
- Bamba as a yagit
- Sunshine as a yagit
- RR Herrera as a yagit
- Atong as a yagit
- Rudy Meyer as Capt. Rodriguez
- Jose Romulo as Police
- Rene Hawkins
- Rachel Ann Wolfe as Cynthia
- Lawrence Pineda as Cynthia's Boyfriend

== Production ==
The film was made in part as one of the eight films presented for the 15th anniversary of Regal Films in 1988.

=== Casting ===
On March 6, 1988, Dawn Zulueta's first day as a co-host of GMA Supershow, she was informed to have been cast, in her first major film role, as the love interest of Fernando Poe Jr. in One Day, Isang Araw.

== Reception ==
=== Critical response ===
Lav Diaz of the Manila Standard gave One Day, Isang Araw a positive review, pointing out that even though the film has many shortcomings in terms of believability and continuity, they are easily forgivable because of the film's depiction of the "enormous sickness" in Philippine society, that of orphaned street children who have been forgotten and neglected by others.

=== Accolades ===
Award-giving body	Category	Recipient	Result	Source
1989 FAMAS Awards	Best Child Actress	Matet de Leon	Won	
