= InstaDad =

2015 Philippine television drama series

- Title card
- Genre: Drama
- Directed by: Neal del Rosario
- Creative director: Roy Iglesias
- Starring: Gabby Eigenmann
- Country of origin: Philippines
- Original language: Tagalog
- No. of episodes: 13

Production
- Executive producer: Mona Coles-Mayuga
- Production locations: Quezon City, Philippines
- Camera setup: Multiple-camera setup
- Running time: 35–39 minutes
- Production company: GMA Entertainment TV

Original release
- Network: GMA Network
- Release: April 5 – July 5, 2015

InstaDad is a 2015 Philippine television drama series broadcast by GMA Network. Directed by Neal del Rosario, it stars Gabby Eigenmann in the title role. It premiered on April 5, 2015. The series concluded on July 5, 2015, with a total of 13 episodes.

The series is streaming online on YouTube.

== Cast and characters ==
Cast

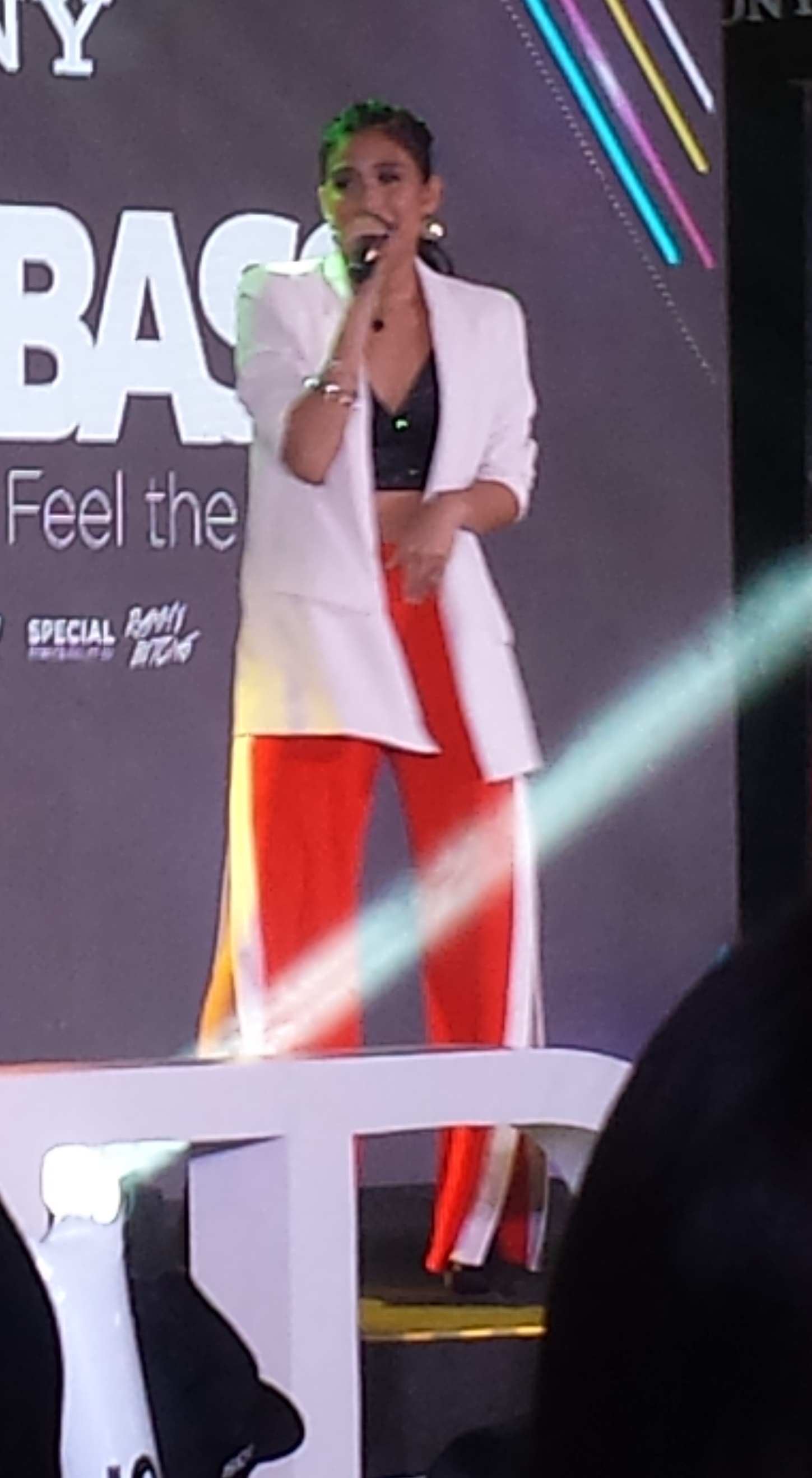
Gabbi Garcia

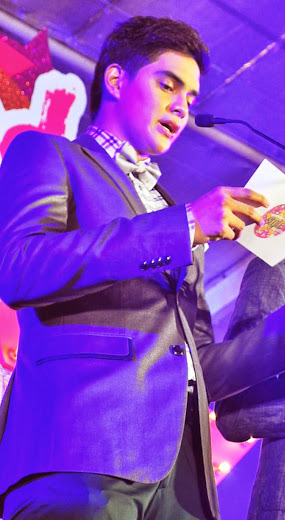
Juancho Triviño

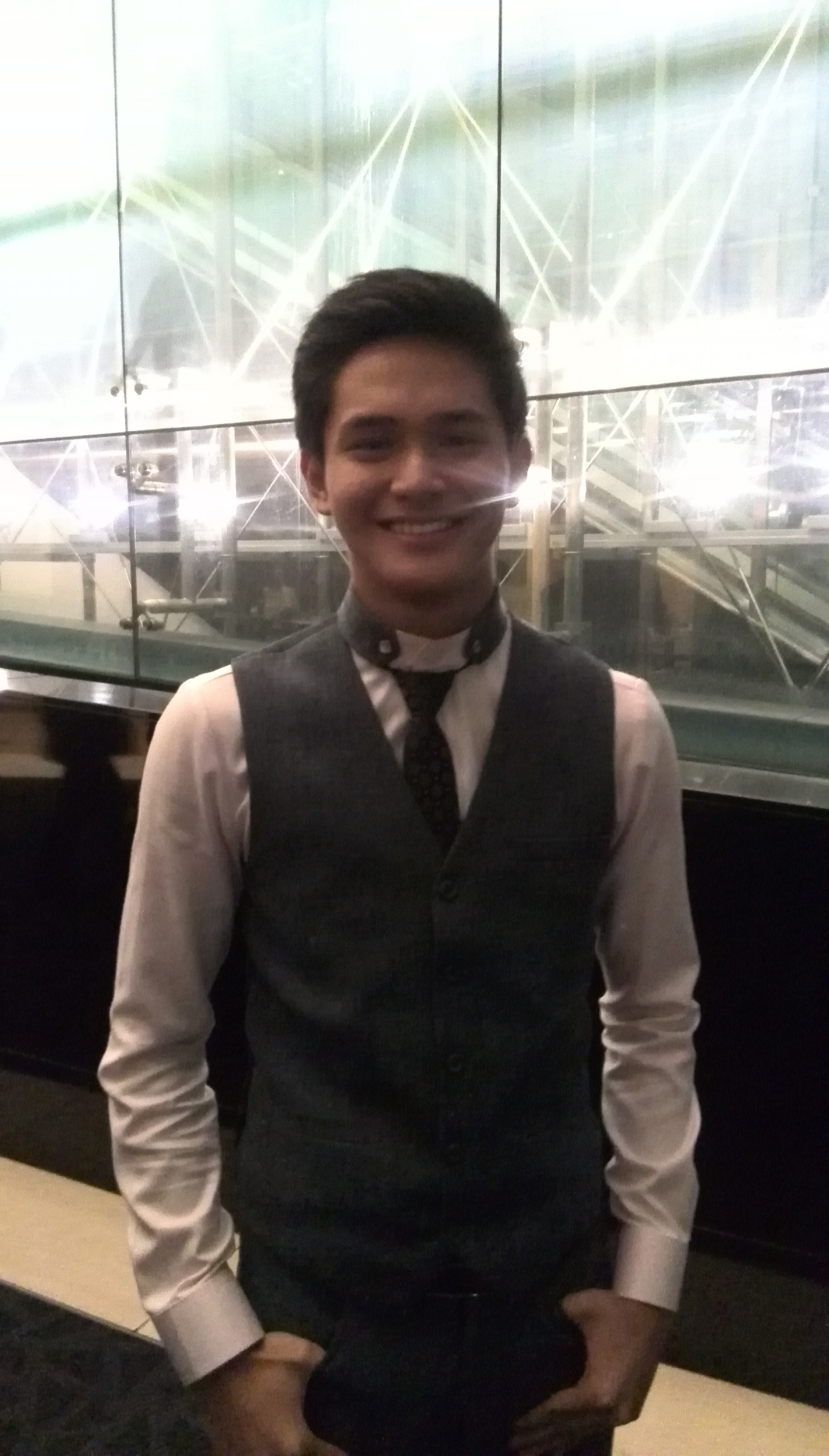
Ruru Madrid

Lead cast

- Gabby Eigenmann as Kenneth Monteamor

Supporting cast

- Jazz Ocampo as Maaya "Aya" Monteamor
- Gabbi Garcia as Marikit "Kit" Monteamor
- Ash Ortega as Mayumi "Yumi" Monteamor-Conception
- Matet De Leon as Gracia
- Juancho Triviño as Dwight Conception
- Prince Villanueva as Ikot
- Ruru Madrid as Zig
- Coleen Perez as Annie
- RJ Padilla as Franco
- Cindy Miranda as Lea

== Ratings ==
According to AGB Nielsen Philippines' Mega Manila household television ratings, the pilot episode of InstaDad earned a 9.7% rating. The final episode scored an 11.9% rating.

== Accolades ==
Accolades received by InstaDad
Year	Award	Category	Recipient	Result	Ref.
2015	29th PMPC Star Awards for Television	Best Drama Mini-Series	InstaDad	Nominated	
