= Ashley Ortega =

Filipino actress (born 1998)

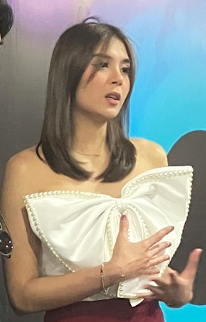
- Ortega in 2023
- Born: Ashleigh Marguerretthe Krystalle Nordstrom Samson; December 26, 1998 (age 27); San Fernando, La Union, Philippines
- Occupation: Actress
- Years active: 2012–present
- Agent(s): Sparkle (2012–present); Regal Entertainment (2018–present)
- Height: 168 cm (5 ft 6 in)

Ashleigh Marguerretthe Krystalle Nordstrom Samson (born December 26, 1998), known professionally as Ashley Ortega (Tagalog: [ˈaʃli oɾˈtɛga]), is a Filipino actress who is known for appearing on the GMA Network television shows Dormitoryo (2013), My Destiny (2014), Widows' Web (2022), Hearts on Ice (2023), and Apoy sa Dugo (2026).

== Early life and education ==
Ortega was born in San Fernando, La Union on December 26, 1998, to a Filipino-German mother and Spanish-Filipino father. She is from Bacnotan, La Union, her mother's hometown. She has an older brother, Malkolm, and younger sister, Alyzza. She went to Immaculate Conception Academy in her grade school years. She is currently studying interior design at SoFA Design Institute.

== Acting career ==
Ortega began her career as a model at the age of 11. A year later, she started appearing on television, where she first did commercials for GMA Network, and then eventually went into acting. Ortega is also a professional figure skater. She started skating at the age of 4 and competed abroad, such as in Malaysia and Thailand.

On May 30, 2024, Ortega won her first international award, as Best Actress at the 2024 Harlem International Film Festival for her role in As If It's True, which premiered at the 19th Cinemalaya Independent Film Festival, opposite Khalil Ramos.

== Other ventures ==
=== Business Ventures & Brand Concepts ===
Ortega launched Rituals Essentials, her dream business focused on everyday fragrance-first body care, featuring products like scented body washes and lotions. Serves as the CEO of SINTA Essentials, an online lifestyle brand specializing in a collection of curated scented candles born out of intentional self-care.

== Personal life ==
Ortega is currently in a relationship with actor Mavy Legaspi.

== Acting credits ==
=== Film ===
Key
†	Denotes films that have not yet been released

Ashley Ortega's film credits with year of release, film titles and roles
Year	Title	Role	Ref.
2012	Bamboo Flowers	Nikka	
2014	My Big Bossing	Fairy	
2017	Spirit of the Glass 2: The Haunted	Chelsea	
2018	Wild and Free	Mira	
2023	As If It's True	Gemma Stone	
2025	KMJS' Gabi ng Lagim: The Movie	Diana	
2025	Shake, Rattle & Roll: Evil Origins	Hermana Salve	

=== Television ===
Key
†	Denotes shows that have not yet been aired

Ashley Ortega's television credits with year of release, title(s) and role
Year	Title	Role	Notes	Ref.
2012–2013	Cielo de Angelina	Marian "Julie" Dela Guardia		
2013	Dormitoryo	Rose Angeles		
2014	Paraiso Ko'y Ikaw	Young Regina Ilustre		
2014	Magpakailanman	Rina	Episode: "Tatay Na Si Totoy, Nanay Na Si Nene"	
2014	My Destiny	Alex Martinez		
2014	Magpakailanman	Maricel	Episode: "Cain At Abel: Ang Kalakal Boys – The Cedric Macdon and Joven Santos Story"	
2015	Magpakailanman	Jasmine	Episode: "Sa Bangin Ng Kamatayan"	
2015	Kailan Ba Tama ang Mali?	Angeli Realonda		
2015	InstaDad	Mayumi "Yumi" Monteamor	Main role	
2015	Magpakailanman	Mimay	Episode: "Ang Huling Yakap Sa Nawalang Anak"	
2015	Dangwa	Wendy Schmitt		
2015	Maynila	Britney		
2015	Maynila	Shayne		
2015	Maynila	Nida		
2016	Wish I May	Eunice Montes		
2016	Maynila	Maya		
2016	A1 Ko Sa 'Yo	Jenny Perez		
2016	Oh My Mama	Ariana Gutierrez		
2017	Magpakailanman	Mitch	Episode: "Love Knows No Age: The Gil Moreno and Mitch Tandingan Millennial Love Story"	
2017	Daig Kayo ng Lola Ko	Sarah		
2017	Wowowin	Herself	Co-host	
2017	Dear Uge	Cheska		
2017	Wish Ko Lang	Gesielle		
2017–2018	Super Ma’am	Kristy Garcia/Maureen	Supporting role	
2019	Magpakailanman	Menchie	Episode: "BUSta't Kasama Kita: The Aurelio and Menchie Love Story"	
2019	Sahaya	Lindsay Alvarez	Main role	
2019	Dear Uge	Shayne		
2019	Magpakailanman	Ella	Episode: "Magkapatid, Biktima Ng Kulto"	
2020	Magpakailanman	Rina	Episode: "A Scandalous Crime"	
2020	Eat Bulaga!			
2021	Legal Wives	Marriam Pabil-Delos Reyes	Supporting role	
2021	Magpakailanman	Jessa	Episode: Our Abusive Father	
2022	Magpakailanman	Rochelle	Episode: "Balut Vendor Turned Inventor: The Roland Barrientos Story"	
2022	Widows' Web	Jacqueline "Jackie/Tisay" Antonio-Sagrado	Main role	
2022	Tadhana	Yvette	Episode: "Sikreto" (Parts 1–2)	
2022	Daig Kayo ng Lola Ko	Blondie	Episode: "Madal-Dolls"	
2022	Tadhana	Desiree	Episode: "Babawiin Ko Ang Langit" (Parts 1–3)	
2022	Magpakailanman	Seannah	Episode: "My Race To Happiness"	
2023	Hearts on Ice	Pauline "Ponggay" B. Campos	Main role	
2023	Royal Blood	Jacqueline "Jackie" Antonio-Mabantog	Guest role; crossover from Widows' Web role	
2023	Black Rider	Car show girl	Guest role	
2024	Pulang Araw	Manuela Apolonio	Supporting role	
2025	Pinoy Big Brother: Celebrity Collab Edition	Herself	Contestant (Housemate)	
2025	Rainbow Rumble	Herself	Contestant	
2025	Sanggang-Dikit FR	Teresa Legaspi	Guest role	
2026	Hating Kapatid	Angel	Guest role	
2026	Apoy sa Dugo	fake Angel Sangalang / Kiara Aquino / Karla Aquino	Main role / Antagonist	
2026	Tadhana	Gwen Samonte	Episode: "Dalawang Mukha ng Pag-ibig" (Parts 1–3)	
2026	Barangay Love Stories	Lia	Episode: "Tulad ng Ulan"	
