= Elle Villanueva =

Filipino actress and dancer

- Born: Janelle Louise Villanueva; February 18, 1996 (age 30); Amadeo, Cavite, Philippines
- Education: De La Salle–College of Saint Benilde
- Occupations: Actress; dancer; model; endorser
- Years active: 2020–present
- Agent: Sparkle GMA Artist Center (2020–present)
- Known for: Return to Paradise, Makiling, and Apoy sa Dugo
- Height: 1.63 m (5 ft 4 in)
- Partner: Derrick Monasterio (2023–present)

Janelle Louise Villanueva (born February 18, 1996), better known as Elle Villanueva is a Filipino actress, dancer, model and endorser who is currently signed under GMA Network's talent agency Sparkle. She is best known for her leading role in Return to Paradise (2022), Makiling (2024), and Apoy sa Dugo (2026).

== Early life and education ==
Villanueva dreamed of pursuing an acting career, but she finished her studies first at De La Salle–College of Saint Benilde, earning her bachelor's degree in Tourism and graduated from BS Hotel, Restaurant, and Institution Management courses.

== Career ==
She started out as a commercial model, appeared as an extra in some television advertisements.

After signing a contract with GMA Artist Center (now Sparkle) in 2020, Villanueva finally made her acting debut on a Magpakailanman episode. Aside from Magpakailanman, she has also appeared in more of GMA's anthologies such as Dear Uge, My Fantastic Pag-ibig, Tadhana, Regal Studio Presents, and Barangay Love Stories.

In 2022, Villanueva gained recognition when she portrayed the role of Eden and being paired with Derrick Monasterio in Return to Paradise. She considered it a biggest break in her career.

In 2023, she joined the supporting cast of Voltes V: Legacy.

== Other ventures ==
=== Business ===
Villanueva opened her first business as co-owner of Nailandia, a franchise nail spa with Ysabel Ortega and Sophia Senoron as business partners, her co-stars and friends in the live-action drama series Voltes V: Legacy. Nailand is located on Quezon City.

== Personal life ==
Villanueva has been dating actor Derrick Monasterio since 2023.

== Filmography ==
=== Television ===
Year	Title	Role
2020	Magpakailanman: A Scandalous Crime	Marlyn
2020	Imbestigador: 20th Anniversary Special	Elizabeth "Baby" Yumping
2021	Magpakailanman: Rape Victim, Ikinulong?	Apple
2021	My Fantastic Pag-ibig: Invisiboi	Thea
2021	Magpakailanman: Prisoners of Love	Evelyn Barretto
2021	Dear Uge: The Bwisitor	Rufa
2021	Magpakailanman: Boxer and His Scholar	Mylene "Mai" Borbon
2021	Tadhana: Hating Kapatid	Carol
2021	Dear Uge: My Special Delivery	Baby
2022	Return to Paradise	Eden "Yenyen" Sta. Maria-Ramos
2022	Regal Studio Presents: Mekaniko si Monica	Monica
2023	Regal Studio Presents: Sana Tayo Na	Eunice
2023	Regal Studio Presents: Love Me in 7 Days	Cathy
2023	Magpakailanman: Mag-asawa, Ginayuma	Dessa
2023	Hearts on Ice	young Libay
2023	Happy Together	Snow
2023	Zero Kilometers Away	Malaya
2023	Voltes V: Legacy	Eva Sanchez
2023	Tadhana: Reunion	Rebecca
2023	Regal Studio Presents: Bride to Be	Ashley
2024	Makiling	Amira Lirio
2024	Magpakailanman: The 19-Day Bride	Gemma Villamar
2024	Regal Studio Presents: Groovy Lola	Lolly
2024	Pulang Araw	Kumander Liwayway
2024	It's Showtime	Herself
2025	Lolong: Pangil ng Maynila	Tamara "Tetet" Melendez
2025	Encantadia Chronicles: Sang'gre	Agua
2025	Sanggang-Dikit FR	Lara
2026	Apoy sa Dugo	Vanessa Sangalang-Panganiban
2026	Barangay Love Stories: Catching Feelings	Mandy

=== Film ===
Year	Title	Role
2023	Voltes V: Legacy - The Cinematic Experience	Eva
2023	Shake, Rattle & Roll Extreme	Raye
