= Apoy sa Dugo =

2026 Philippine television drama series

- Title card
- Also known as: The Sisters' Game
- Genre: Psychological thriller; Drama
- Written by: R.J. Nuevas; Ken De Leon
- Directed by: Ralfh Manuel Malabunga
- Starring: Elle Villanueva; Derrick Monasterio; Ashley Ortega
- Country of origin: Philippines
- Original language: Tagalog
- No. of episodes: 78

Production
- Camera setup: Multiple-camera setup
- Production company: GMA Entertainment Group

Original release
- Network: GMA Network
- Release: March 2 – June 19, 2026

Apoy sa Dugo (transl. fire on blood / international title: The Sisters' Game) is a 2026 Philippine television drama psychological thriller series broadcast by GMA Network. Directed by Ralfh Manuel Malabunga, it stars Elle Villanueva, Derrick Monasterio and Ashley Ortega. It premiered on March 2, 2026, on the network's Afternoon Prime line up. The series concluded on June 19, 2026, with a total of 78 episodes.

The series is originally titled as Sister's Game. It is streaming online on YouTube.

== Premise ==
Vanessa is a lawyer who offers her service to the poor for free. She is married to Marco, a businessman, whom she shares a happy life with. When Vanessa's long lost sister, Angel enters Vanessa's life, things will get hard for Vanessa as Angel becomes obsessed with her.

== Cast and characters ==
Lead cast

- Elle Villanueva as Vanessa
- Derrick Monasterio as Marco
- Ashley Ortega as Angel

Supporting cast

- Thea Tolentino
- Pinky Amador as Sylvia Panganiban
- Ricardo Cepeda
- Cai Cortez
- Patricia Coma
- Larkin Castor
- Fonzi as Fonzi

== Development ==
The series and its cast members were announced in August 2025. Principal photography commenced in December 2025.

== Ratings ==
According to AGB Nielsen Philippines' Nationwide Urban Television Audience Measurement People in television homes, the pilot episode of Apoy sa Dugo earned a 4.1% rating. The final episode scored a 4.5% rating.
