= Carmen Guadalupe Fonz =

Mexican politician

- Born: 22 June 1954 (age 72); Mexico City, Mexico
- Occupations: Deputy and Senator
- Political party: PRI

Carmen Guadalupe Fonz Sáenz (born 22 June 1954) is a Mexican politician affiliated with the PRI. As of 2013 she served as Senator of the LX and LXI Legislatures of the Mexican Congress representing Campeche (as replacement of Fernando Ortega Bernés). She also served as federal deputy during the LIX Legislature and a local deputy in the LV Legislature of the Congress of Campeche.
