= Voltes V: Legacy =

2023 Philippine television drama series

- Title card
- Genre: Action drama; Science fantasy
- Based on: Voltes V (1977) by Saburo Yatsude
- Written by: Suzette Doctolero; Loi Nova; Libay Trinidad; Jake Somera
- Directed by: Mark A. Reyes V
- Creative director: Aloy Adlawan
- Starring: Miguel Tanfelix; Radson Flores; Matt Lozano; Raphael Landicho; Ysabel Ortega
- Opening theme: "Voltes V No Uta" by Julie Anne San Jose
- Ending theme: "Chichi wo Motomete (I Want Father)" by Matt Lozano
- Country of origin: Philippines
- Original language: Tagalog
- No. of episodes: 90

Production
- Executive producers: Shinichiro Shirakura; Teejay del Rosario; Darling Pulido-Torres
- Cinematography: Gary L. Gardoce; Roman Theodossis
- Running time: 23–31 minutes
- Production company: GMA Entertainment Group

Original release
- Network: GMA Network
- Release: May 8 – September 8, 2023

Voltes V: Legacy is a 2023 Philippine television drama action science fantasy series broadcast by GMA Network. The series is based on the Japanese anime television series Voltes V. Directed by Mark A. Reyes V, it stars Miguel Tanfelix, Radson Flores, Matt Lozano, Raphael Landicho and Ysabel Ortega. It premiered on May 8, 2023, on the network's Telebabad line up. The series concluded on September 8, 2023, with a total of 90 episodes.

The series is streaming online on YouTube.

== Cast and characters ==
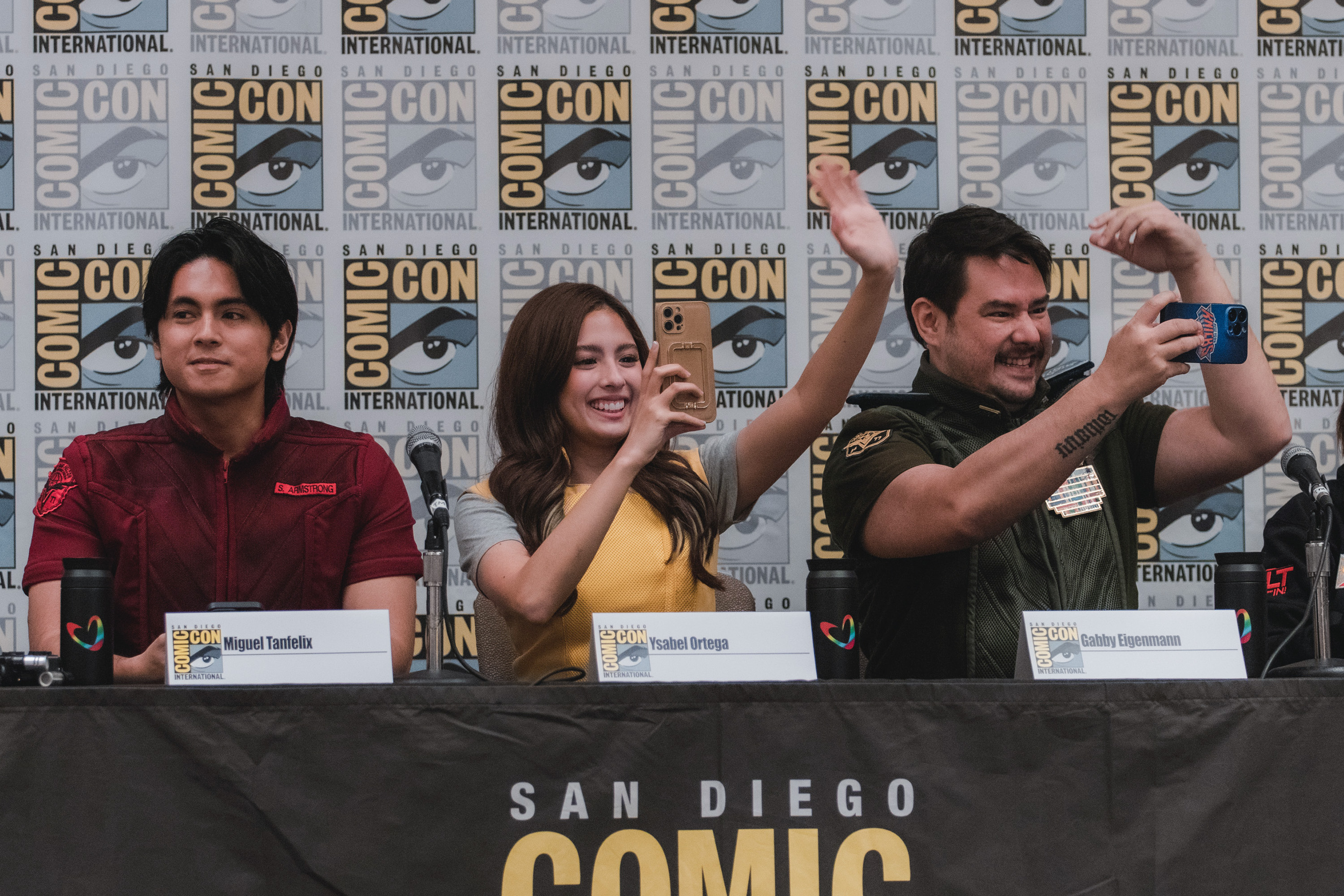
Cast members Miguel Tanfelix, Ysabel Ortega, and Gabby Eigenmann at San Diego Comic-Con 2023.

Lead cast

- Miguel Tanfelix as Steve Armstrong
- Radson Flores as Mark Gordon
- Matt Lozano as Robert "Big Bert" Armstrong
- Raphael Landicho as Jon "Little Jon" Armstrong
- Ysabel Ortega as Jamie Robinson

Supporting cast

- Martin del Rosario as Zardoz / Manuel Nabuz
- Liezel Lopez as Zandra
- Epy Quizon as Zuhl
- Carlo Gonzales as Draco
- Gabby Eigenmann as Oscar Robinson
- Neil Ryan Sese as Larry Hook
- Albert Martinez as Richard Smith
- Christian Vasquez as Zu Zambojil
- Ryan Eigenmann as Zu Zander
- Chanda Romero as Contessa
- Nico Antonio as Oslack
- Jamie Wilson as Garth
- Elle Villanueva as Eva Sanchez
- Jamir Zabarte as Tomas del Rosario
- Sophia Senoron as Ally Chan
- Crystal Paras as Judy / Judalah
- Angela Alarcon as Kelly Bautista
- Dave Duque as PJ
- Julia Pascual as Anna
- Kimson Tan as Tadao Santiago
- Migs Villasis as Apable
- Joaquin Manansala as Edwards
- Jon Lucas as Ignacio
- Dion Ignacio as Obgen
- Juan Rodrigo as Baden
- Kyle Ocampo as Amira
- Kokoy de Santos as Harvey Perez
- Michael V. as the voice of Octo-1

Guest cast

- Dennis Trillo as Hrothgar / Ned Armstrong
- Carla Abellana as Mary Ann Armstrong
- Max Collins as Rozalia
- Carlos Siguion Reyna as a Boazanian emperor
- Seth dela Cruz as younger Steve
- Steven Canja as younger Bert
- Khaine dela Cruz as younger Zardoz
- Bibeth Orteza as Fadsa
- Mike Lloren as Watson
- Brent Valdez as Magus
- Sharmaine Arnaiz as Luisa Gordon
- Marx Topacio as Somera
- Kylie Padilla as Arisa
- Pancho Magno as Takeo
- Vaness del Moral as Zaki

== Development ==
Voltes V: Legacy is a live-action television adaptation by GMA Network of the Japanese anime television series Voltes V that was produced by Toei Company and Sunrise. GMA Network acquired the rights to make a live-action adaptation through Telesuccess Productions, Toei's Philippine licensee. Voltes V was first broadcast in the Philippines on May 5, 1978, on GMA Network.

== Production ==
In January 2020, GMA Network hired Riot Inc. for the post-production of the series. Toei Company supervised the series, whom later gave an approval through a commendation letter.

Mark A. Reyes V was hired as the director of the television series, and has been attached for eight years, from the pitching and approval of the series. Noel Layon Flores served as the lead visual designer. Suzette Doctolero was attached as the writer.

Production sets had been made for Camp Big Falcon, the Boazanian Skull Ship and the Boazanian Earth underground base. The costumes took a year to produce, undergoing several revisions. Reyes said that they had to establish a "good marriage within the classic Voltes V look and one that's acceptable nowadays" when it comes to the series' visuals, adding that they deviate from using spandex for the costumes.

Production was delayed due to the COVID-19 pandemic in 2020. Principal photography commenced on May 28, 2021. It was halted in August 2021 due to the enhanced community quarantine in Metro Manila. Filming resumed on September 18, 2021 and concluded in August 2023.

== Release ==
The series made its television debut on GMA Network on May 8, 2023. Episodes were uploaded on the GMA Network's YouTube channel.

Voltes V: Legacy (Japanese: ボルテスV レガシー) began airing in Japan as a 20-episode series on November 12, 2024, on Tokyo MX with Japanese language dubbing.

=== Theatrical cut ===
Prior to the television debut, a theatrical cut titled Voltes V: Legacy – The Cinematic Experience, premiered on April 18, 2023, in SM North EDSA, Quezon City. A limited theatrical release was held at SM Cinemas the following day. The 107 minute film covers footage from the first 15 episodes of the television series.

In Japan, the theatrical cut Voltes V: Legacy – Ultra Electromagnetic Edition (超電磁編集版, Cho Denji Henshu Ban), was released on October 18, 2024, featuring Japanese dub and scenes excluded from the Cinematic Experience version released in the Philippines. A prequel episode connected to the film entitled Yoake no Mae (夜明けの前) was released on September 10, 2024, by Toei on its YouTube channel.

== Ratings ==
According to AGB Nielsen Philippines' Nationwide Urban Television Audience Measurement People in television homes, the pilot episode of Voltes V: Legacy earned a 14.6% rating. The final episode scored a 13.8% rating.
