= Kumander Liwayway =

Philippines guerilla fighter (1918–2014)

- Born: Remedios Guinto Gomez; 12 July 1918; Mexico, Pampanga, Philippine Islands
- Died: May 15, 2014 (aged 95); Quezon City, Metro Manila, Philippines
- Other name: Remedios Gomez Paraiso
- Occupations: Nurse, Military Commander
- Spouse: Banaag Paraiso

Remedios Guinto Gomez Paraiso (born Remedios Guinto Gomez, July 12, 1918 – May 15, 2014), known primarily as Kumander Liwayway, was a Filipino guerilla fighter during World War II.

== Early life ==
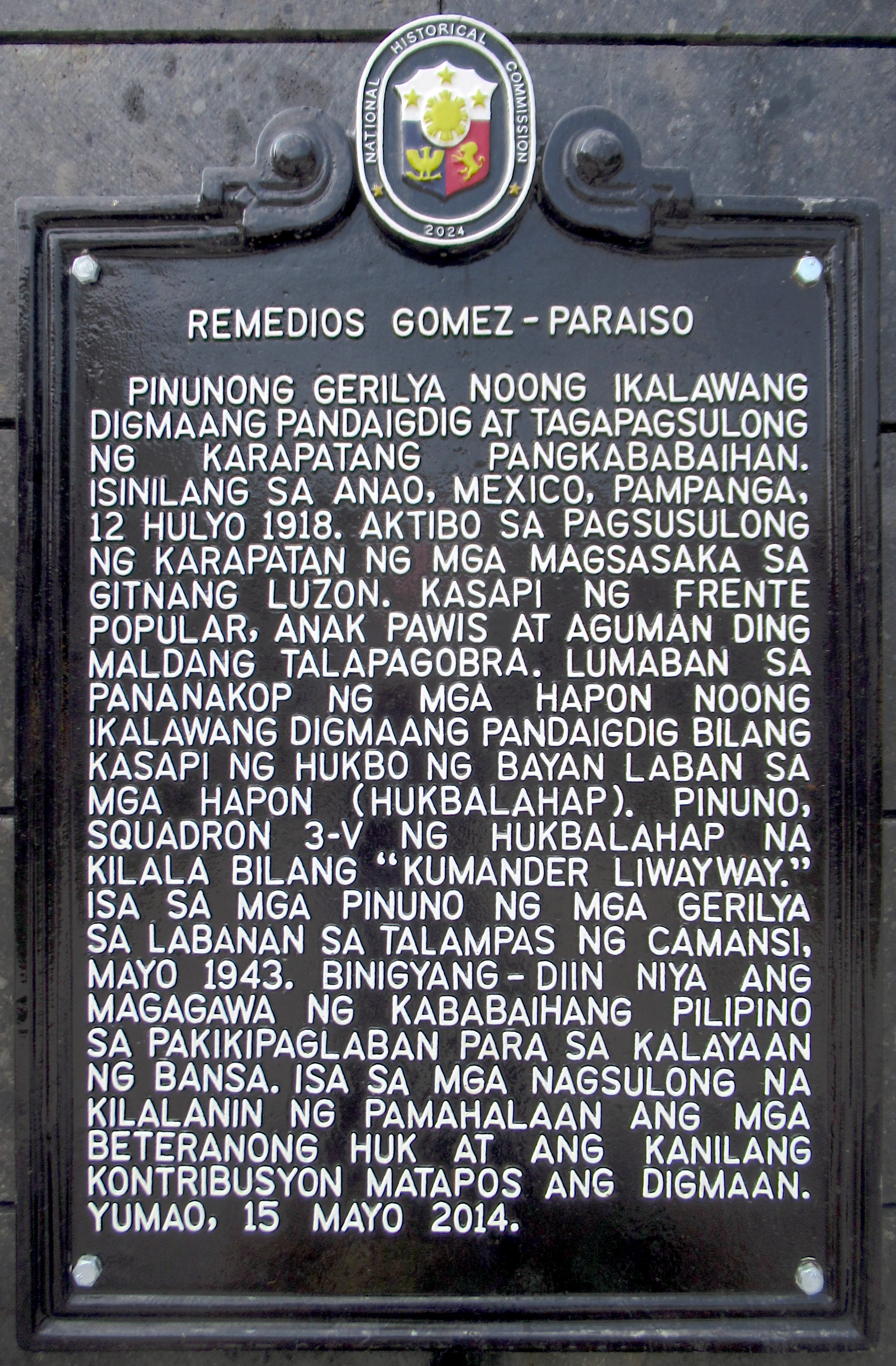
National historical marker installed in Mexico, Pampanga, in 2024

Gomez was the daughter of Maximiana Guintu and Basilio Gomez, the vice mayor of Mexico, a provincial town in Pampanga, Philippines. As a teenager, she was interested in making dresses and perfume, and often participated in local beauty pageants.

== World War II guerilla ==
After Japan invaded the Philippines in 1941, her father organized resistance against them. He was captured, tortured and executed by the Japanese. His corpse was displayed for everyone to see. Her father's death inspired her to leave home to join the guerrilla forces against Japan.

Gomez and her brother Oscar were recruited by the Hukbalahap, a guerrilla movement based near Mount Arayat. The guerrilla forces gave her the name Kumander Liwayway ("Commander Dawn"). She chose to join “rather than die without putting up resistance.” She quickly moved up through the ranks of the military receiving both combat training and Marxist education.

She was known for dressing formally and wearing red lipstick in battle. Her reasoning was that she was fighting for the right to be herself. She first served as a nurse. Only 10% of soldiers were female. However, after a few months, she was promoted to commander of her military squad.

During the Battle of Kamansi, the rebels were ordered to retreat, but Liwayway and her squad refused to do so. Although heavily outnumbered, her group fought off the Japanese. As outcome, the Japanese were forced into a retreat. After the battle, Liwayway's fame spread to other provinces.

After the Americans returned to the Philippines in 1944, the Huks assisted Allied forces' efforts in Luzon. Toward the end of the war, Liwayway tracked down the Japanese officer who killed her father. She inflicted the same punishment on him that he had done to her father.

== Post-war and later life ==
She did not accept the victory over the Japanese as the end of the struggle. She again joined the Huks in struggling against the new Philippine democracy which she considered a “farce.” She was arrested and charged with rebellion but was later released and joined her husband, Bani Paraiso as part of the expansion force in Visayas in 1948. In a raid later that year, Bani was killed and Liwayway was captured. Though she was eventually acquitted, her career as a revolutionary military commander ended here.

With a son to raise, Liwayway laid down her arms and went to work in a market. Liwayway fought for Filipino resistance fighters' recognition as World War II veterans. Moreover, she lobbied for military pensions and became vocal about the contribution of Filipino women in the war.

== Death ==
In 2014, Gomez died at the age of 95 due to cardiopulmonary arrest.

== In popular culture ==
She was posthumously featured on a documentary magazine program History Presents: Mga Babae Sa Rebolusyon in 2014.

In 2021, her story was depicted in the 2021 short film Beauty Queen.

In 2024, she was portrayed by Elle Villanueva in the TV series Pulang Araw.
