= List of television series that changed networks =

Television series whose first-run broadcasts were on multiple networks, which are listed in chronological order after each show name.

== A ==
- Aawitan Kita (RPN, GMA, ABC)
- Adventures of the Gummi Bears (NBC, ABC, Syndication)
- Adyenda (ZOE TV, GMA, QTV, GMA News TV)
- AEW Dynamite (TNT, TBS)
- Agila (RPN, ABS-CBN)
- Airwolf (CBS, USA)
- Aladdin (Disney Channel, Syndication, CBS)
- Alfred Hitchcock Presents (CBS, NBC)
- Alisto (GMA, GMA News TV)
- All Rise (CBS, OWN)
- All My Children (ABC, TOLN via Hulu)
- The Alvin Show (CBS, NBC as Alvin and the Chipmunks (1983), Nickelodeon as Alvin and the Chipmunks (2015))
- American Bandstand (WPVI-TV, ABC, Syndication, USA)
- American Dad! (FOX, TBS)
- America's Most Wanted (FOX, Lifetime)
- America's Next Top Model (UPN, The CW, VH1)
- American Idol (FOX, ABC)
- Ang Dating Daan (IBC, RPN, RJTV, PTV, SBN, UNTV)
- Ang Iglesia ni Cristo (MBS, PTV, RPN, IBC, BBC, City2, ABS-CBN, Net 25, GEM TV, INC TV)
- Ang Manok ni San Pedro (RPN, IBC)
- Ang Tamang Daan (SBN, Net 25, INC TV)
- Animaniacs (FOX, The WB, Hulu)
- Anna Luna (ABS-CBN, RPN)
- Archer (FX, FXX)
- Are You Afraid of the Dark? (YTV, Family Channel)
- Arrested Development (FOX, Netflix)
- Art Is Kool (GMA, ABC)
- The Arthur Murray Party (ABC, DuMont, CBS, NBC)
- Asenso Pinoy (ABC, IBC, NBN, PTV, Studio 23, S+A, A2Z)
- At Your Service (GMA, QTV as At Your Service-Star Power)
- Ating Alamin (MBS, PTV, IBC, ABC, NBN)

== B ==
- Babylon 5 (PTEN, TNT)
- Bachelor Father (CBS, NBC, ABC)
- The Basketball Show (ABC, RPN)
- Batibot (RPN, PTV, ABS-CBN, GMA, TV5)
- BattleBots (Comedy Central, ABC, Science, Discovery)
- Battle of the Brains (RPN, PTV)
- Baywatch (NBC, Syndication)
- Beat the Clock (CBS, ABC, Syndication, CTV, PAX TV, Universal Kids)
- Beetlejuice (ABC, FOX)
- The Berenstain Bears (CBS, PBS)
- The Betty White Show (KLAC-TV, NBC)
- Between Brothers (FOX, UPN)
- Big Brother: After Dark (Showtime 2, TVGN/Pop, Slice)
- Big Brother (Channel 4, Channel 5)
- Big Hero 6: The Series (Disney XD, Disney Channel)
- Bill & Ted's Excellent Adventures (CBS, FOX)
- Billboard Music Awards (FOX, ABC, NBC)
- The Bionic Woman (ABC, NBC)
- Bitag (ABC, IBC, TV5, PTV)
- Bitag Live (UNTV, AksyonTV, PTV)
- Biyaheng Langit (RPN, IBC, PTV, RJTV)
- Black Mirror (Channel 4, Netflix)
- Blockbusters (ITV, Sky1, BBC Two, Challenge)
- Bob the Builder (Nickelodeon, PBS)
- Breaking the Magician's Code: Magic's Biggest Secrets Finally Revealed (FOX, MyNetwork TV)
- Brooklyn Nine-Nine (FOX, NBC)
- Brotherly Love (NBC, The WB)
- Buffy the Vampire Slayer (The WB, UPN)
- Business and Beyond (GMA News TV, PTV, IBC)
- Buzz Lightyear of Star Command (UPN, ABC)

== C ==
- Cafeteria Aroma (ABS-CBN, RPN, GMA)
- Camp Candy (NBC, Syndication)
- Card Sharks (NBC, CBS, Syndication, ABC)
- Celebrity Big Brother (Channel 4 / E4, BBC One, Channel 5, 5Star)
- Celebrity Deathmatch (MTV, MTV2)
- Celebrity Family Feud (NBC, ABC)
- Charles in Charge (CBS, Syndication)
- Charmed (The WB, The CW)
- The Chase (GSN, ABC)
- Chicks to Chicks (IBC, ABS-CBN as Chika Chika Chicks)
- Chikiting Patrol (ABS-CBN, IBC, GMA, ABC)
- The Chris Gethard Show (MNN, Fusion, TruTV)
- Cobra Kai (YouTube Red/YouTube Premium, Netflix)
- Coke Studio Philippines (TV5, ABS-CBN)
- Coney Reyes on Camera (RPN, ABS-CBN)
- Clueless (ABC, UPN)
- Cold Justice (TNT, Oxygen)
- Cougar Town (ABC, TBS)
- Columbo (NBC, ABC)
- The Critic (ABC, FOX)
- Community (NBC, Yahoo! View)

== D ==
- Damages (FX, Audience Network)
- Damayan (ABS-CBN, GTV, MBS, PTV as Damayan Ngayon, NBN)
- Dancing with the Stars (ABC, Disney Plus)
- Danger Mouse (Thames, CBBC)
- The Danny Thomas Show (ABC, CBS)
- Darkwing Duck (Disney Channel, Syndication, ABC)
- The Dating Game (ABC, Syndication)
- Davis Rules (ABC, CBS)
- Dayaw (ANC, PTV)
- The Days and Nights of Molly Dodd (NBC, Lifetime)
- Days of Our Lives (NBC, Peacock)
- The Detective Starring Robert Taylor (ABC, NBC)
- Diff'rent Strokes (NBC, ABC)
- Diyos at Bayan (ZOE TV, Light TV, RPN, NBN, GMA, QTV, GMA News TV, A2Z)
- Doctor Who Confidential (BBC Three, BBC One, BBC Two Wales, BBC HD, BBC America, CBBC)
- Doraemon (NTV, TV Asahi)
- Double Dare (Nickelodeon, Syndication)
- Doug (Nickelodeon, ABC)
- Down You Go (DuMont, CBS, ABC, NBC)
- DuckTales (2017) (Disney XD, Disney Channel)
- The Dude Perfect Show (CMT, Nickelodeon)

== E ==
- Eat Bulaga! (RPN, ABS-CBN, GMA, TV5)
- The Edge of Night (CBS, ABC)
- Eggheads (BBC One, BBC Two, Channel 5)
- The Ernie Kovacs Show (NBC, CBS, DuMont, ABC)
- Ethel and Albert (NBC, CBS, ABC)
- Everybody Hates Chris (UPN, The CW)
- The Expanse (Syfy, Amazon Prime Video)
- Expedition Wild (Nat Geo Wild, ABC, The CW)

== F ==
- Fame (NBC, syndication)
- Family Double Dare (FOX, Nickelodeon)
- Family Feud (ABC, Syndication, CBS)
- Family Feud (ABC, GMA, ABS-CBN)
- Family Kuarta o Kahon (ABS-CBN, BBC, City2, RPN)
- Family Matters (ABC, CBS)
- Family TV Mass (IBC, GMA, 5 Plus, One Sports)
- Father Dowling Mysteries (NBC, ABC)
- Father Knows Best (CBS, NBC)
- Fear Factor (NBC, MTV)
- Final Space (TBS, Adult Swim)
- Finders Keepers (Nickelodeon, Syndication)
- For Your Love (NBC, The WB)
- Flashpoint (CBS, Ion)
- For Kids Only (ABS-CBN, RPN)
- Friday Night Lights (NBC, The 101 Network)
- Front Row (GMA News TV, GMA)
- Fudge (ABC, CBS)
- Fun House (Syndication, FOX)
- Futurama (FOX, Comedy Central, Hulu)

== G ==
- The Game (The CW, BET)
- Gargoyles (Syndication, ABC)
- Get Smart (NBC, CBS)
- Getting By (ABC, NBC)
- The Ghost & Mrs. Muir (NBC, ABC)
- Gilmore Girls (The WB, The CW)
- Girlfriends (UPN, The CW)
- God, the Devil and Bob (NBC, Adult Swim)
- Goin' Bananas (BBC, IBC, ABS-CBN)
- Goof Troop (Syndication, ABC)
- The Great British Bake Off (BBC Two, BBC One, Channel 4)
- Grounded for Life (FOX, The WB)
- Gulong ng Palad (BBC/RPN, ABS-CBN)

== H ==
- Hallmark Hall of Fame (NBC, CBS, PBS, ABC, Hallmark Channel)
- Hazel (NBC, CBS)
- Healthline (ABC, IBC, PTV)
- Hercules (Syndication, ABC)
- The Hogan Family (NBC, CBS)
- Hole in the Wall (FOX, Cartoon Network)
- Hollywood Squares (NBC, Syndication)
- Hollywood Showdown (PAX, GSN)
- Home Movies (UPN, Adult Swim)
- The Hughleys (ABC, UPN)

== I ==
- Impact! (Fox Sports Net, Webcast, Urban America Television, Spike, Destination America, Pop, Pursuit Channel, Twitch, AXS TV, AMC)
- Infinity Train (Cartoon Network, HBO Max)
- Interspecies Reviewers (Funimation, Critical Mass video)
- In the Heat of the Night (NBC, CBS)
- In the House (NBC, UPN, Syndication)
- Isumbong Mo Kay Tulfo (RPN, PTV)
- It's a Living (ABC, Syndication)
- It's Always Sunny in Philadelphia (FX, FXX)

== J ==
- The Jackie Gleason Show (DuMont as Cavalcade of Stars, CBS)
- JAG (NBC, CBS)
- Jay Jay the Jet Plane (TLC, PBS Kids)
- The Jeff Foxworthy Show (ABC, NBC)
- Jeopardy! (NBC, Syndication)
- The Joey Bishop Show (NBC, CBS)

== K ==
- Kagat ng Dilim (IBC, TV5)
- Kapag May Katwiran, Ipaglaban Mo! (IBC, ABS-CBN as Ipaglaban Mo!, RPN, GMA News TV as Kapag nasa Katwiran, Ipaglaban Mo!, Kapamilya Channel, A2Z)
- Kape at Balita (GMA, GMA News TV)
- Kasangga Mo ang Langit (RPN, IBC, PTV, RJTV)
- Kids Incorporated (Syndication, Disney Channel)
- Kids Say the Darnedest Things (CBS, ABC)
- Kids TV (RPN, ABC)
- Kidsongs (Syndication, PBS)
- The Killing (AMC, Netflix)
- The Kris Aquino Show (PTV, GMA)

== L ==
- Land of the Lost (NBC, ABC)
- Law & Order: Criminal Intent (NBC, USA)
- Last Man Standing (ABC, FOX)
- The Lawrence Welk Show (KTLA, ABC, Syndication, PBS)
- Leave It to Beaver (CBS, ABC)
- Let's Make a Deal (NBC, ABC, Syndication, CBS)
- Line of Duty (BBC Two, BBC One)
- The Lion Guard (Disney Channel, Disney Junior)
- Live with Kelly and Ryan (WABC-TV, Syndication)
- Longmire (A&E, Netflix)
- Loosely Exactly Nicole (MTV, Facebook)
- Love Connection (Syndication, FOX)
- Loveliness (ABS-CBN, IBC)
- Lovesick (Channel 4 as Scrotal Recall, Netflix)
- Lovingly Yours, Helen (GMA, BBC, City2)
- Lucifer (FOX, Netflix)

== M ==
- Mad TV (FOX, The CW)
- Magnum P.I. (CBS, NBC)
- Making the Band (ABC, MTV)
- Manifest (NBC, Netflix)
- Mary Kay and Johnny (DuMont, CBS, NBC)
- Match Game (NBC, CBS, Syndication, ABC)
- Matlock (NBC, ABC)
- May Bukas Pa (IBC, RPN)
- Mech-X4 (Disney Channel, Disney XD)
- Medium (NBC, CBS)
- Men Behaving Badly (Thames, BBC One)
- The Message (ABS-CBN, IBC, INC TV)
- The Mickey Mouse Club (ABC, Syndicated, Disney Channel)
- Mickey and the Roadster Racers (Disney Channel, Disney Junior)
- Mickey Mouse Clubhouse (Playhouse Disney, Disney Junior)
- The Mindy Project (FOX, Hulu)
- Minor Adjustments (NBC, The WB)
- Minute to Win It (NBC, GSN)
- Miraculous: Tales of Ladybug & Cat Noir (Nickelodeon, Netflix, Disney Channel)
- Molang (Piwi+), (Canal+ Family), Disney Junior, Disney Channel)
- Monday Night Football (ABC, ESPN)
- Mongolian Barbecue (IBC, RPN)
- Monty Python's Flying Circus (BBC One, BBC Two)
- Morecambe and Wise (BBC, ATV, Thames)
- Motoring Today (IBC, PTV, NBN, Solar Sports)
- The Morey Amsterdam Show (CBS, DuMont)
- Mukha ng Buhay (PTV, RPN)
- Muppet Babies (CBS, Disney Junior)
- Muppets Tonight (ABC, Disney Channel)
- Murdoch Mysteries (Citytv, CBC)
- Mr. Ed (Syndication, CBS)
- My Three Sons (ABC, CBS)
- Mystery Science Theater 3000 (KTMA, The Comedy Channel, Comedy Central, Sci Fi, Netflix)

== N ==
- The Naked Truth (ABC, NBC)
- Nashville (ABC, CMT)
- NBA Inside Stuff (NBC, ABC, NBA TV)
- The New Leave It to Beaver (Disney Channel, Superstation WTBS, Superstation TBS)
- The Newlywed Game (ABC, Syndication, GSN)
- Not So Late Night with Edu (GMA, ABS-CBN)

== O ==
- Okay Ka, Fairy Ko! (IBC, ABS-CBN, GMA)
- On-Air (ABC, IBC)
- One Day at a Time (Netflix, Pop, TV Land)
- One Life to Live (ABC, TOLN via Hulu)
- One Tree Hill (The WB, The CW)
- The Original Amateur Hour (DuMont, ABC, NBC, CBS)
- The Outer Limits (Showtime, Syfy)

== P ==
- Pangunahing Balita (ABC, PTV)
- Pantomime Quiz (CBS, NBC, DuMont, ABC)
- The Paper Chase (CBS, PBS, Showtime)
- Passions (NBC, The 101 Network)
- Philippines' Most Wanted (PTV, NBN, ABC)
- Phineas and Ferb (Disney Channel, Disney XD)
- The Pirates of Dark Water (ABC, Syndication)
- The PJs (FOX, The WB)
- A Place to Call Home (Seven Network, Foxtel)
- Pokémon (Syndication, Kids WB, Cartoon Network, Disney XD, Netflix)
- Politically Incorrect (Comedy Central, ABC)
- Poltergeist: The Legacy (Showtime, Sci Fi)
- Power Rangers franchise (FOX, ABC, Toon Disney, Nickelodeon, Netflix)
- The Price Is Right (NBC, ABC, CBS, Syndication)
- The Price Is Right (ABC, ABS-CBN)
- Probe (ABS-CBN, GMA as The Probe Team, ABC as The Probe Team Documentaries)
- Project Runway (Bravo, Lifetime)
- Public Forum (IBC, ABC)

== R ==
- Realtree Outdoors (TNN, ESPN2, Outdoor Channel)
- Recipe Rehab (YouTube, ABC, CBS)
- The Red Green Show (CHCH-TV, Global, CBC)
- Regal Shocker (GMA, IBC, TV5)
- Reporter's Notebook (GMA, GMA News TV, GTV)
- The Ren & Stimpy Show (Nickelodeon, Spike TV as Ren & Stimpy "Adult Party Cartoon")
- Ring of Honor Wrestling (HDNet, Sinclair stations, Destination America, NESN, Comet TV, Charge TV, Cox Sports Television, Fox Sports Networks, Stadium, Bally Sports. FITE TV, Honor Club)
- Robot Wars (BBC Two, BBC One, BBC Choice, Channel 5)
- Rocky and His Friends (ABC, NBC as The Bullwinkle Show)
- Rock the Park (The CW, ABC)
- Roswell (The WB, UPN)
- RuPaul's Drag Race (Logo, VH1, MTV)

== S ==
- Sabrina: The Animated Series (UPN, ABC)
- Sabrina the Teenage Witch (ABC, The WB)
- Sailor Moon (TV Asahi, Tokyo MX)
- Saturday Night's Main Event (NBC, FOX)
- Scooby-Doo (CBS, ABC, The WB, The CW, Cartoon Network, Boomerang)
- Scream (MTV, VH1)
- Scrubs (NBC, ABC)
- SEAL Team (CBS, Paramount+)
- Search for Tomorrow (CBS, NBC)
- Secret Millionaire (FOX, ABC)
- Second City Television (Global, CBC, Superchannel)
- See True (IBC, GMA)
- Sesame Street (NET, PBS, HBO, HBO Max, Netflix)
- The Sharon Cuneta Show (IBC, ABS-CBN)
- Shop 'til You Drop (Lifetime, The Family Channel, PAX)
- Side Stitch (ABC, RPN)
- Silk Stalkings (CBS, USA)
- Silver Spoons (NBC, Syndication)
- Single (ABC, IBC)
- Sister, Sister (ABC, The WB)
- Sliders (FOX, Sci Fi)
- SmackDown Live (UPN, The CW, MyNetworkTV, Syfy, USA, FOX)
- Smallville (The WB, The CW)
- Something So Right (NBC, ABC)
- Southland (NBC, TNT)
- The Spectacular Spider-Man (The CW, Disney XD)
- Shaun the Sheep (CBBC, Netflix)
- Stargate SG-1 (Showtime, Sci Fi)
- Star Trek: Prodigy (Paramount+/Nickelodeon, Netflix)
- Star vs. the Forces of Evil (Disney XD, Disney Channel)
- Step by Step (ABC, CBS)
- Student Canteen (ABS-CBN, GMA, RPN)
- Summer Camp Island (Cartoon Network, HBO Max)
- Supergirl (CBS, The CW)
- Super Games (IBC, GMA)
- The Super Hero Squad Show (Cartoon Network. The Hub)
- Super Sloppy Double Dare (Nickelodeon, Syndication)
- Supermarket Sweep (ABC, Lifetime, PAX; returned to ABC)
- Supernatural (The WB, The CW)
- Superstars of Wrestling (WATL, Syndicated)

== T ==
- T. J. Hooker (ABC, CBS)
- Tales from the Cryptkeeper (ABC, CBS as New Tales from the Cryptkeeper)
- TaleSpin (Disney Channel, Syndication)
- Tattletales (CBS, Syndication)
- Taxi (ABC, NBC)
- Teamo Supremo (ABC, Toon Disney)
- Thomas & Friends (PBS Kids, Nick Jr. Channel)
- Through the Keyhole (ITV, Sky1, BBC One, BBC Two)
- Tic-Tac-Dough (NBC, CBS, Syndication)
- Tierra Sangre (PTV, RPN)
- Tiny Toon Adventures (Syndication, FOX)
- To Tell the Truth (CBS, NBC, Syndication, ABC)
- Tom Corbett, Space Cadet (CBS, ABC, NBC, DuMont)
- Torchwood (United Kingdom: BBC Three, BBC Two, BBC One; United States: Starz HD)
- Torchwood Declassified (BBC Three, BBC Two)
- The Tony Randall Show (ABC, CBS)
- Travel Time (IBC, GMA, Studio 23, ANC)
- Tropang Potchi (Q, GMA)
- Tuca & Bertie (Netflix, Adult Swim)
- Tunay na Buhay (GMA, GMA News TV, GTV)
- TV Nation (NBC, FOX)
- Twin Peaks (ABC, Showtime)

== U ==
- Uncle Bob's Lucky 7 Club (GMA, RPN as Uncle Bob's Children's Show)
- Unforgettable (CBS, A&E)
- The United States Steel Hour (ABC, CBS)
- University Challenge (ITV, BBC Two)
- UnREAL (Lifetime, Hulu)
- Unsolved Mysteries (NBC, CBS, Lifetime, Spike, Netflix)
- Unwrapped 2.0 (Food Network, Cooking Channel)

== V ==
- Vacation Creation (The CW, ABC)
- Valiente (ABS-CBN, GMA)
- Veronica Mars (UPN, The CW, Hulu)

== W ==
- Wagon Train (NBC, ABC)
- Wander Over Yonder (Disney Channel, Disney XD)
- The Wayne Brady Show (ABC, Syndication)
- The Weakest Link (BBC Two, BBC One)
- The World Tonight (ABS-CBN, ANC, Kapamilya Channel)
- Wheel of Fortune (NBC, Syndication, CBS)
- Wheel of Fortune (ABC, ABS-CBN)
- Who Wants to Be a Millionaire? (IBC, TV5)
- Whose Line Is It Anyway? (Channel 4, ABC, ABC Family, The CW)
- Wild 'n Out (MTV, MTV2, VH1)
- Wilfred (FX, FXX)
- Win, Lose or Draw (NBC, Syndication, Disney Channel)
- Winx Club (Rai 2, Rai Gulp)
- Wonder Woman (ABC, CBS)
- WWE Diva Search (Spike TV, USA Network, UPN, WWE.com)
- WWE Heat (USA Network, MTV, TNN, Webcast on WWE.com)
- WWE NXT (Syfy, Mun2, WWE.com, Hulu, WWE Network, USA Network, The CW)
- WWE Raw (USA, Spike TV, Netflix)
- WWE Superstars (WGN America, WWE.com, Hulu Plus, WWE Network)
- WWE Tough Enough (MTV, UPN, USA Network)
- WWF Superstars of Wrestling (Syndicated, USA Network, TNN)

== Y ==
- You (Lifetime, Netflix)

== # ==
- 1 vs. 100 (NBC, GSN)
- 101 Dalmatians: The Series (ABC, Syndication)
- 2+2=4 (BBC, City2, PTV)
- 21 Jump Street (FOX, Syndication)
- 3R (Respect, Relax, Respond) (GMA, QTV, TV5)
- 5 and Up (ABC, GMA)
- The 7D (Disney XD, Disney Channel, Disney Junior)
- 7th Heaven (The WB, The CW)
- 9-1-1 (FOX, ABC)
