= 1996 in Philippine television =

The following is a list of events affecting Philippine television in 1996. Events listed include television show debuts, finales, cancellations, and channel launches, closures and rebrandings, as well as information about controversies and carriage disputes.

== Events ==
- March 11 - RPN debuts the series premiere of MariMar, which would begin an era of Latino drama broadcasts in Philippine television.
- May 1 - The ABS-CBN News Channel (ANC) was officially launched as the Sarimanok News Network (SNN).
- May 6 - Pinoy Box Office was officially launched as the Viva Cinema.
- June 13 – ABS-CBN Corporation celebrated its 50th anniversary of original establishment in 1946.
- July 30 – Tito, Vic & Joey celebrated the 17th Anniversary of Eat Bulaga!.
- September 14 – ABS-CBN Corporation celebrated its 10th anniversary of re-establishment following the People Power Revolution.
- October 12 - Studio 23 (later S+A from January 18, 2014, to May 5, 2020) was officially launched, until its closure on January 17, 2014.

=== Unknown dates ===
- Alice Galemit won ₱2,250,000 on Eat Bulaga!'s Lottong Bahay.

== Premieres ==
Date	Show
February 12	TV Patrol General Santos on ABS-CBN TV-3 General Santos
February 18	Sunday's Big Showdown on IBC 13
February 19	Cool Detective on IBC 13
February 19	Monday's Movie Magic on IBC 13
February 19	The Equalizer on IBC 13
February 19	Hot Stuff on IBC 13
February 20	MVTV on IBC 13
February 21	Jiban on IBC 13
February 21	Ghost Fighter on IBC 13
February 21	Amazing Stories on IBC 13
February 21	The Naked Truth on IBC 13
February 21	The Single Guy on IBC 13
February 21	Cinema Scoop on IBC 13
February 22	Premier Night Telecine on IBC 13
February 22	Party of Five on IBC 13
February 22	Pillow Talk on IBC 13
February 23	Rated E on IBC 13
March 4	Blow by Blow on IBC 13
March 11	Marimar on RPN 9
March 12	The Neverending Story on RPN 9
March 12	Kung Fu: The Legend Continues on RPN 9
March 12	Chicago Hope on RPN 9
March 13	Friends on ABC 5
March 13	Extreme on ABC 5
March 13	Something Wilder on ABC 5
March 21	SeaQuest 2032 on RPN 9
April 7	Sunday Night Specials on ABC 5
April 8	Lyra on GMA 7
April 12	Friday Box Office on ABC 5
April 13	Saturday Night Blockbusters on ABC 5
April 15	Tierra Sangre on PTV 4
April 15	Mukha ng Buhay on PTV 4
April 15	Kris on PTV 4
April 27	Creepy Crawlers on ABC 5
April 28	Familia Zaragoza on ABS-CBN 2
May 1	The World Tonight on Sarimanok News Network
May 1	Sarimanok Network News on Sarimanok News Network
May 4	The World Tonight (Weekend edition) on Sarimanok News Network
May 5	Partners Mel and Jay on GMA 7
May 6	D.A.T.S. on GMA 7
May 9	Usapang Business on ABS-CBN 2
May 12	Super Games on GMA 7
May 12	Eezy Dancing on ABC 5
May 13	Good Evening Please on ABC 5
May 18	Wild About Wheels on ABC 5
May 24	XYZ: Young Women's TV on PTV 4
May 25	Wow Mali on ABC 5
May 26	Love Bytes on ABC 5
May 31	Super Laff-In on ABS-CBN 2
June 1	The Weekend News on ABS-CBN 2 and Sarimanok News Network
June 3	Alas Singko Y Medya on ABS-CBN 2
June 15	Gimik on ABS-CBN 2
July 1	TV Patrol Naga on ABS-CBN TV-11 Naga
July 8	Dateline Philippines on Sarimanok News Channel
July 8	Balitang K on ABS-CBN 2
July 22	María Mercedes on ABS-CBN 2
July 22	South of Sunset on ABC 5
August 3	Central Park West on RPN 9
August 8	Babylon 5 on RPN 9
August 11	Space: Above and Beyond on RPN 9
August 12	Kris on GMA 7
August 12	Maja the Bee on GMA 7
August 12	ETChing: Entertainment Today with Lyn Ching on GMA 7
August 12	Mia Gracia on GMA 7
August 12	Tierra Sangre on RPN 9
August 12	Mukha ng Buhay on RPN 9
August 26	Cancion de Amor on RPN 9
August 26	Acapulco, Cuerpo y Alma on RPN 9
September 2	Mary and the Secret Garden on ABS-CBN 2
September 2	Ilusiones on ABS-CBN 2
September 2	The Quantum Channel on ABS-CBN 2
September 10	1896 on ABC 5
October 7	TV Patrol Dagupan on ABS-CBN TV-32 Dagupan
October 11	Mighty Morphin Alien Rangers on ABS-CBN 2
October 14	Simplemente Maria on RPN 9
October 14	News 23 on Studio 23
October 21	Maria la del Barrio on RPN 9
November 9	Ora Engkantada on RPN 9
November 10	Anna Karenina on GMA 7
November 11	Agujetas de Color de Rosa on GMA 7
November 11	Ms. D! on GMA 7
November 11	Flames on ABS-CBN 2
November 18	Today with Kris Aquino on ABS-CBN 2
November 28	Public Life with Randy David on GMA 7
December 9	GoBingo on GMA 7

=== Unknown Dates ===
- May:
  - Magandang Gabi... Bayan on Sarimanok News Network
  - The Quantum Channel on Sarimanok News Network

=== Unknown ===
- Cyber Jam on SBN 21
- SBN Live on SBN 21
- SBN Karaoke on SBN 21
- Lihim ng Gabi on GMA 7
- PG (Parents Guide) on GMA 7
- Aawitan Kita on GMA 7
- 1896 Kalayaan on GMA 7
- Earthlink on ABS-CBN 2
- Powerline on ABS-CBN 2
- Guni Guni on ABC 5
- Home Sweet Haus on ABC 5
- Que Horror on ABC 5
- Chinese Variety Show on ABC 5
- Ogag on ABC 5
- Dighay Bayan on PTV 4
- Muay Thai on PTV 4
- Better Home Ideas on RPN 9
- Veggie, Meaty & Me on RPN 9
- Nap Knock on RPN 9
- Let's Dance with Becky Garcia on RPN 9
- Good Morning Misis! on RPN 9
- Star Search sa 9 on RPN 9
- Back to Back on RPN 9
- Life in the Word on RPN 9
- Nap Knock on RPN 9
- Isumbong Mo Kay Tulfo on RPN 9
- The Quantum Channel on RPN 9
- Winspector on IBC 13
- PSE Live: The Stock Market Today on IBC 13
- Usisera-Intrigera on IBC 13
- Mag Smile Club Na! on IBC 13
- Sky Ranger Gavan on IBC 13
- Ilusiones on ABS-CBN 2
- Lazos de Amor on ABS-CBN 2
- Pollyanna on ABS-CBN 2
- Magic Knight Rayearth on ABS-CBN 2
- Little Women on ABS-CBN 2
- Neon Genesis Evangelion on ABC 5
- Eto Rangers on ABC 5
- Battle Ball on IBC 13
- Dragon Quest on IBC 13
- Ranma ½ on RPN 9
- Free Willy on ABC 5
- The Twisted Tales of Felix the Cat on ABC 5
- Jetman on PTV 4
- Hana Yori Dango on ABS-CBN 2
- Iris: The Happy Professor on ABS-CBN 2
- Janperson on ABS-CBN 2
- ER on ABC 5
- Frasier on ABC 5
- Touched by an Angel on ABC 5
- Morena Clara on ABC 5
- X-Men on ABC 5

== Programs transferring networks ==
Date	Show	No. of seasons	Moved from	Moved to
February 18	Philippine Basketball Association	22	PTV	VTV (IBC)
March 4	Blow by Blow	—N/a	PTV	VTV (IBC)
May 5	Mel & Jay	—N/a	ABS-CBN	GMA Network (retitled as Partners Mel and Jay)
July 21	National Collegiate Athletic Association	72	PTV	VTV (IBC)
August 12	Tierra Sangre	—N/a	PTV	RPN
August 12	Mukha ng Buhay	—N/a	PTV	RPN
August 12	Kris	—N/a	PTV	GMA Network
October 14	Oprah	—N/a	RPN	Studio 23
November 7	National Basketball Association	—N/a	GMA Network / Citynet 27	VTV (IBC)
Unknown	Sky Ranger Gavan	—N/a	ABC	VTV (IBC)
Unknown	Pollyanna	—N/a	ABC	ABS-CBN
Unknown	Better Home Ideas	—N/a	ABC	RPN
Unknown	Metro Manila Popular Music Festival	—N/a	MBS (now PTV) / RPN	GMA Network (retitled as Metropop Song Festival)

== Finales ==
- February 24: Sky Ranger Gavan on ABC 5
- February 26: Blow by Blow on PTV 4
- February 27:
  - Inside Showbiz on GMA 7
  - Batang X sa TV on ABC 5
- March 31:
  - Mel & Jay on ABS-CBN 2
  - Sunday Night Special on ABC 5
- May 3: That's Entertainment on GMA 7
- May 26: The World Tonight (Weekend edition) on ABS-CBN 2 and Sarimanok News Network
- May 31:
  - Asia Business News on ABS-CBN 2
  - Magandang Umaga Po on ABS-CBN 2
- June 8: Game Na Game Na! on ABS-CBN 2
- August 2: Mother Studio Presents on GMA 7
- August 9:
  - Tierra Sangre on PTV 4
  - Mukha ng Buhay on PTV 4
  - Kris on PTV 4
  - Kadenang Kristal on GMA 7
  - Eye to Eye on GMA 7
- September 1: Lovingly Yours on GMA 7
- October 18: MariMar on RPN 9
- October 25: Kris on GMA 7
- November 8: D.A.T.S. on GMA 7

=== Unknown ===
- Liberty on TV on GMA 7
- Profiles Of Power on GMA 7
- Sounds Family on GMA 7
- FPJ sa GMA on GMA 7
- 1896 Kalayaan on GMA 7
- World TV Mag on World TV 21
- Lente on ABC 5
- Small Wonder on ABC 5
- Action Theater on ABC 5
- Better Home Ideas on ABC 5
- Kada on ABC 5
- P.O.P.S.: Pops On Primetime Saturday on ABC 5
- 1896 on ABC 5
- Guni Guni on ABC 5
- Home Sweet Haus on ABC 5
- Hope Top of the Hour News on ABC 5
- Isang Tanong, Isang Sagot! on ABC 5
- Nora Aunor Sunday Drama Special on ABC 5
- Movie Greats on ABS-CBN 2
- Carol En Cosme on ABS-CBN 2
- Bayan Ko, Sagot Ko on ABS-CBN 2
- Movie Greats on ABS-CBN 2
- Konsumer Korner on IBC 13
- P.Y. (Praise Youth) on IBC 13
- T.A.H.O (Tawanan at Awitan kay Hesus Oras-oras) on IBC 13
- Usisera-Intrigera on IBC 13
- PPP: Piling Piling Pelikula on IBC 13
- Lumayo Ka Man on RPN 9
- Chibugan Na! on RPN 9
- Actually, Yun Na! on RPN 9
- Back To Back on RPN 9
- Star Smile Factory on RPN 9
- Veggie, Meaty & Me on RPN 9
- Race Weekend on PTV 4
- Pollyanna on ABS-CBN 2
- Little Women on ABS-CBN 2
- Si Mary at Ang Lihim na Hardin on ABS-CBN 2
- X-Men on ABS-CBN 2
- Eto Rangers on ABC 5
- Walker, Texas Ranger on GMA 7
- Morena Clara on ABC 5
- Small Wonder on ABC 5
- The Pink Panther on ABC 5
- The Ruff and Reddy Show on ABC 5
- Yaiba on ABC 5

== Networks ==
=== Launches ===
- May 1: Sarimanok News Network (now ABS-CBN News Channel)
- May 6: Viva Cinema
- October 12: Studio 23 (now Aliw 23)

=== Closures ===
- December 31: Sky Movies (Sign-On debut on January 26, 1992)

== Births ==
- January 3 - Baninay Bautista
- January 4 - Joshua Colet, actor and model
- January 6 - Elisse Joson, actress, model and endorser
- January 15 - Julian Estrada, actor
- January 22 – Khalil Ramos, actor and singer
- February 3 – Rhap Salazar, singer, songwriter and actor
- February 19 – Jackielyn Esmeralda, broadcaster of reporter and anchor (former actress, TV host and singer)
- March 17 – Dante Inosanto, TV Host, actor and singer
- March 26 – Kathryn Bernardo, actress and singer
- March 29 – Erin Ocampo, TV Host, singer, dancer and actress
- April 3 - Jonathan Celestino, actor, dancer and TV host
- April 12 - Charlie Dizon, actress and dancer
- April 22 - Angelica Mauricio, actress and model
- April 29 – Rebecca Chiongbian, actress
- May 10 - Anjo Damiles, actor
- May 14 - Jessica Villarubin
- May 21 – Jay Arcilla, actor
- May 27 - Rico dela Paz, actor
- June 2 - Morissette, singer, songwriter, and actress
- June 9 - Marvelous Alejo, actress and singer
- June 13 - JM Dela Cerna, singer
- July 20 - Sue Ramirez, actress
- July 22 – Jane Oineza, actress
- July 23 – Viy Cortez, vlogger
- August 3 –
  - Kristoffer Horace Neudeck, actor and model
  - Anikka Dela Cruz
- August 9 – Sanya Lopez, actress
- August 13 - Thea Tolentino, actress
- August 15 - Chienna Filomeno, actress, dancer and TV Host
- August 17 – Ella Cruz, actress
- August 24 – Faye Lorenzo
- August 31 – Eugene Herrera, actor and swimmer
- September 8 – Krystal Reyes, actress
- September 13 – CJ Navato, actor
- September 21 – Cecille Escolano, actress, dancer and TV Host
- September 27 – Remedy Rule, swimmer
- October 9 - Vincent Manlapaz, actor, dancer and TV Host
- October 17 –
  - Karen Reyes, actress
  - Nikki de Guzman, broadcaster
- October 26 – Ronnie Alonte, actor and singer
- November 4 – Michael Christian Martinez, figure skater
- November 7 – Luke Gebbie, swimmer
- November 14 – Rabiya Mateo, actress, beauty queen and host
- November 28 –
  - Claire Bercero, actress and dancer
  - Tom Doromal, actor, dancer and TV Host
- December 7 – Kamille Filoteo, dancer, singer and TV Host
- December 11 – Kelly Day, actress, model, singer, dancer, TV Host
- December 22 -
  - Joao Constancia, actor, dancer and singer
  - Makisig Morales, actor and singer
- December 25 - Ivana Alawi, actress

== Deaths ==
- May 19
  - Eruel Tongco, actor
  - Ireneo Sevilla, actress
  - Joy Clarise Cojuangco, actress
  - Bienvenido Dela Rosa, actor
- June 2 - Ishmael Bernal, Filipino film, stage and television director, actor
- November 27 - Balot, comedian, film, television and stage actor

== See also ==
- 1996 in television
