= Esperança =

Esperança (Portuguese and Catalan for "hope") may refer to:

== Places ==
- Esperança, Ceará, Ceará, Brazil
- Esperança, Paraíba, Paraíba, Brazil
- Esperança (Arronches), a parish in the municipality of Arronches, Portugal
- Esperança (Póvoa de Lanhoso), a parish in the municipality of Póvoa de Lanhoso, Portugal

== Other ==
- Esperança (album), an album by Brazilian gospel band Diante do Trono
- Esperança Garcia (born 1751), forcibly enslaved Black Brazilian woman and Brazil's first female lawyer
- Esperança (non-profit), a non-profit based out of Phoenix, AZ
- Esperança (TV series), a Brazilian telenovela produced and aired by TV Globo

== See also ==
- Esperanza (disambiguation)
