= Jerry Lopez Sineneng =

Filipino film and television director and screenwriter

- Born: June 10, 1965 (age 61)
- Other name: Jerry Sineneng
- Education: University of the Philippines Diliman
- Occupations: Film director; television director; screenwriter
- Years active: 1985–present
- Awards: FAMAS Award for Best Screenplay (2000)

Jerry Lopez Sineneng (born June 10, 1965), also credited as Jerry Sineneng, is a Filipino film and television director and screenwriter. He began working in film production in 1985 and made his feature-film directing debut with Mara Clara: The Movie in 1996. His directing credits include the films Labs Kita... Okey Ka Lang? (1998), Soltera (1999), Way Back Home (2011), and A Special Memory (2026), as well as the television series Esperanza, Walang Hanggan, Kadenang Ginto, and Widows' Web. In 2000, Sineneng and Jun Lana won the FAMAS Award for Best Screenplay for Soltera.

== Early life and education ==
Sineneng was born on June 10, 1965. He initially studied biology at the University of the Philippines before transferring to the university's newly established Film and Audio-Visual Arts program in the College of Mass Communication. He was a member of the program's first graduating class and completed his studies in 1986.

== Career ==
=== Early work and film directing ===
Before graduating, Sineneng worked as a wardrobe assistant under director Chaning Carlos on the 1985 comedy Horsey-Horsey: Tigidig-Tigidig. He later spent two years as a production assistant at FPJ Productions. He then joined a writing group led by Peque Gallaga and worked on screenplays for the second, third, and fourth installments of the Shake, Rattle & Roll film series.

When the drama anthology Maalaala Mo Kaya began broadcasting on ABS-CBN, Sineneng submitted a script and was hired as a resident writer. The program later gave him his first television-directing assignment. He directed his first feature film, Mara Clara: The Movie, in 1996, followed by films including Flames: The Movie (1997), Kung Ayaw Mo, Huwag Mo! (1998), Labs Kita... Okey Ka Lang? (1998), Soltera (1999), and Ngayong Nandito Ka (2003). His screenplay for Soltera, co-written with Lana, received the 2000 FAMAS Award for Best Screenplay.

=== Television work ===
Sineneng's first television drama series as a director was Esperanza in 1997. His subsequent ABS-CBN work included Labs Ko Si Babe, Basta't Kasama Kita, Hiram, Maria Flordeluna, Kahit Isang Saglit, Dahil May Isang Ikaw, Imortal, Walang Hanggan, Huwag Ka Lang Mawawala, Hawak Kamay, A Love to Last, Kadenang Ginto, Love Thy Woman, and La Vida Lena.

After more than two decades with ABS-CBN, Sineneng signed with GMA Network in November 2021. His first announced project for the network was the suspense drama Widows' Web. He subsequently co-directed Start-Up PH (2022) with Dominic Zapata and directed Stolen Life (2023–2024).

In 2026, Sineneng directed the GMA afternoon series House of Lies, following his work on Prinsesa ng City Jail. He described drama and horror as his strongest genres and said that his on-set process included rehearsals and collaborative work with actors. He also returned to film directing with A Special Memory, a Philippine adaptation of the Japanese television drama Pure Soul, written by National Artist Ricky Lee and released in March 2026.

=== Directing approach ===
Sineneng has said that he seeks to make the stories he directs believable and relatable. In discussing his television work, he has emphasized concentration, mutual support among actors, and rehearsal as part of his production process.

== Selected filmography ==
=== Film ===
Selected film directing credits
Year	Title
1996	Mara Clara: The Movie
1997	Flames: The Movie
1998	Kung Ayaw Mo, Huwag Mo!
1998	Labs Kita... Okey Ka Lang?
1999	Soltera
2003	Ngayong Nandito Ka
2011	Way Back Home
2014	Maybe This Time
2026	A Special Memory

=== Television ===
Selected television directing credits
Year(s)	Title
1997	Esperanza
2000–2002	Pangako Sa 'Yo
2012	Walang Hanggan
2018	Kadenang Ginto
2021	La Vida Lena
2022	Widows' Web
2022	Start-Up PH
2023	Stolen Life
2025	Prinsesa ng City Jail
2026	House of Lies

== Awards and nominations ==
Year	Award	Category	Work	Result
2000	FAMAS Award	Best Screenplay (with Jun Lana)	Soltera	Won
