= Esperanza =

Esperanza is the Spanish word for hope, and may refer to:

== Places ==
=== Philippines ===
- Esperanza, Agusan del Sur, a municipality
- Esperanza, Masbate, a municipality
- Esperanza, Sultan Kudarat, a municipality

=== United States ===
- Esperanza, Mississippi, an unincorporated community
- Esperanza, New York, historic name of the village of Athens
- Esperanza, Hudspeth County, Texas, an unincorporated community
- Esperanza, Montgomery County, Texas, a ghost town
- Esperanza, Puerto Rico, a town in Vieques
- Esperanza (Jerusalem, New York), an historic home in Jerusalem, New York

=== Other ===
- Esperanza Base, a settlement in Antarctica
- Esperanza, Santa Fe, a city in Argentina
- Esperanza, Belize, a village in Cayo District, Belize
- La Esperanza, Norte de Santander, Colombia, a municipality and town
- Esperanza (Ranchuelo), a village in Villa Clara Province, Cuba
- Esperanza, Dominican Republic, a municipality in Valverde province
- La Esperanza, Ecuador, a town and parish
- La Esperanza, Quetzaltenango, Guatemala, a municipality
- La Esperanza, Honduras, a city and municipality in Intibucá Department
- Esperanza (municipality), a town and municipality in Puebla, Mexico
- Esperanza, Ucayali, a city in Peru
- La Esperanza, the seat of the municipality of El Rosario, Tenerife, in the Canary Islands of Spain
- La Esperanza (prison), El Salvador

== Mines ==
- Esperanza mine, underground copper mine in Atacama Region, Chile
- Esperanza mine which was merged in 2014 with El Tesoro mine to form the Centinela copper mine, Antofagasta Region, Chile
- Esperanza mine, a former silver mine in Chañarcillo, Atacama Region, Chile

== People ==
- Esperanza (given name), a Spanish feminine given name, and people with that name
- Gabriel Esperanza, 17th-century rabbi

== Film and TV ==
- Esperanza (film), a 1946 Mexican film
- Esperanza (Philippine TV series)
- Esperanza (Chilean TV series), a 2011 telenovela

== Music ==
- Esperanza, a flamenco project by Carlos Villalobos
- Esperanza (Michael Rother album), 1996
- Esperanza (Esperanza Spalding album), 2008
- Próxima Estación: Esperanza, a 2001 album by Manu Chao
- "Esperanza" (Charles Aznavour song), 1961
- "Esperanza" (Enrique Iglesias song), 1998
- "Esperanza" (Dick Dale song), 1993 song on Dale's album Tribal Thunder

== Organizations ==
- Esperanza International, a non-profit organization that develops Dominican Republican communities through microfinancing
- Esperanza Peace and Justice Center, a non-profit community-based arts & cultural organization that advocates for social justice
- Esperanza Unida, Inc., a non-profit organization that provides job training and placement to unemployed minority workers in Milwaukee, Wisconsin, United States

== Other uses ==
- MV Esperanza, a 1984 Greenpeace ship
- Esperanza (Madrid Metro), a station of the Madrid Metro
- Esperanza (bug), a genus of bugs
- Tecoma stans, a yellow flower sometimes called esperanza
- Esperanza High School, Anaheim, California, United States
- Esperanza Drum and Bugle Corps, a modern drum corps from San Diego, California, United States
- Esperanza Ortega, the title character of Esperanza Rising, a 2000 novel
- La Esperanza Airport (Nicaragua)
- Esperanza Diamond, found in Crater of Diamonds State Park

== See also ==
- Esperanza Fire, a wind-driven arson fire that started in a river wash near Cabazon, California
- Esperança (disambiguation)
- Esperanto, the most widely spoken constructed international auxiliary language
- Teatro de la Ciudad, Mexico City, formerly Teatro Esperanza Iris
