= Third Eye (2014 film) =

- Theatrical release poster
- Directed by: Aloy Adlawan
- Written by: Aloy Adlawan
- Produced by: Lily Y. Monteverde
- Starring: Carla Abellana; Camille Prats; Ejay Falcon; Denise Laurel
- Cinematography: Mo Zee
- Edited by: Jay Halili
- Music by: Teresa Barrozo
- Production company: Regal Films
- Release date: February 26, 2014
- Running time: 89 minutes
- Country: Philippines
- Languages: Filipino; English

Third Eye is a 2014 Filipino horror film directed by Aloy Adlawan and starring Carla Abellana, Camille Prats, Ejay Falcon and Denise Laurel. It was produced by Regal Entertainment.

== Synopsis ==
When Mylene (Carla Abellana) was a young child she witnessed the grisly death of her neighbor and her parents. She discovers soon after that she has the ability to see the dead. Her grandmother chooses to close her third eye, protecting her for the time being from the horrors of seeing spirits. But with the death of her grandmother, Mylene's third eye reopens. It is an ability that she must come to grips with, as she, in pursuit of her adulterous husband, inadvertently travels into dark, dangerous territory populated by a community of murderous practitioners of black magic.

== Cast ==
- Carla Abellana as Mylene
- Camille Prats as Susan
- Ejay Falcon as Jimmy
- Denise Laurel as Janet
- Alex Medina as Cenon
- Boots Anson-Roa as Gloria
- Dimples Romana as Belen
- Cai Cortez as Ryzza
- Mosang as Aludia
- Robert Correa as Nanding
- Rain Quite as Ram Ram
- Patricia Joanne Coma as Young Mylene

== See also ==
- List of ghost films
