= A Special Memory =

2026 romantic drama film by Jerry Lopez Sineneng

- Official movie poster
- Directed by: Jerry Lopez Sineneng
- Screenplay by: Ricky Lee
- Based on: Pure Soul by Michiru Egashira and Yuuko Matsuda
- Produced by: Vincent G. Del Rosario III; Valerie S. Del Rosario; Veronique D. Corpus
- Starring: Carlo Aquino; Bela Padilla
- Cinematography: Eduardo Jacinto
- Edited by: Roy Francia
- Music by: Jessie Q. Lasaten
- Production companies: Viva Films; Globalgate Entertainment
- Distributed by: Viva Films
- Release date: March 11, 2026
- Running time: 124 minutes
- Country: Philippines
- Language: Filipino

A Special Memory is a 2026 Philippine romantic drama film directed by Jerry Lopez Sineneng from a screenplay written by Ricky Lee. A Philippine film adaptation of the 2001 Japanese romantic drama series Pure Soul, the film tells the story of a couple, Dindo (Carlo Aquino) and Sandra (Bela Padilla), who face challenges when the latter is diagnosed with Alzheimer's disease. Lotlot de Leon, Joel Torre, Jaime Fabregas, Yayo Aguila, Phoebe Walker, and Paolo Gumabao appear in supporting roles.

Produced and distributed by Viva Films, in association with Globalgate Entertainment, the film was theatrically released in the Philippines on March 11, 2026.

== Plot ==
Sandra, a fashion designer, falls in love with Dindo, a foreman who works at her family's construction business. Just as their life as a couple began, Sandra was diagnosed with a rare type of Alzheimer's.

== Cast ==
- Carlo Aquino as Dindo: A foreman working at a construction company owned by Sandra's family
- Bela Padilla as Sandra: A fashion designer who has a rare type of Alzheimer's
- Lotlot de Leon
- Joel Torre
- Jaime Fabregas
- Yayo Aguila
- Phoebe Walker
- Paolo Gumabao

== Production ==
=== Development ===
The project was originally a co-production of Viva Films, GMA Pictures, and APT Entertainment, with Nuel C. Naval as the director while Mel Mendoza-Del Rosario writing the screenplay. However, when the latter two production companies backed out of the project after Alonzo's departure, Viva Films became the sole producer, with Jerry Lopez Sineneng as director, while Ricky Lee wrote the screenplay.

=== Casting ===
Bea Alonzo and Alden Richards were originally chosen to play the lead characters. However, due to Alonzo's commitments, she was replaced by Julia Barretto before the project went into an overhaul, with the leads now played by Carlo Aquino and Bela Padilla.

In an interview with Boy Abunda on his talk show, Carlo Aquino hesitated twice before accepting the role because the project was relatable to him through his aunt, who has Alzheimer's disease.

=== Filming ===
The project's filming was originally scheduled to commence in November 2021 amid the COVID-19 pandemic, and then rescheduled to February 2022. However, in May 2023, it was announced that it had been postponed due to scheduling conflicts, and Alonzo backed out because of her commitment to GMA Network's primetime series Love Before Sunrise.

== Release ==
A Special Memory was released in Philippine theaters on March 11, 2026, with selected cinemas offering a discount.
