= Stolen Life (Philippine TV series) =

Philippine television drama series

- Title card
- Genre: Fantasy drama
- Created by: Obet Villela
- Written by: Glaiza Ramirez; Tina Velasco; Lobert Villela; Geng Delgado; Meryl Bunyi
- Directed by: Jerry Lopez Sineneng
- Creative director: Aloy Adlawan
- Starring: Gabby Concepcion; Beauty Gonzalez; Carla Abellana
- Theme music composer: Ann Margaret Figueroa
- Opening theme: "Kilala ng Puso" by Mariane Osabel
- Country of origin: Philippines
- Original language: Tagalog
- No. of episodes: 80

Production
- Executive producer: Nieva S. Magpayo
- Cinematography: Erwin Cruz
- Editors: Robert S. Pancho; Julius James Castillo; Gervic Estella-Tumbaga; James Kevin Li
- Camera setup: Multiple-camera setup
- Running time: 20–29 minutes
- Production company: GMA Entertainment Group

Original release
- Network: GMA Network
- Release: November 13, 2023 – March 1, 2024

Stolen Life is a Philippine television drama fantasy series broadcast by GMA Network. Directed by Jerry Lopez Sineneng, it stars Gabby Concepcion, Beauty Gonzalez and Carla Abellana. It premiered on November 13, 2023 on the network's Afternoon Prime line up. The series concluded on March 1, 2024, with a total of 80 episodes.

The series is streaming online on YouTube.

== Premise ==
When a criminal performs astral projection to body swap with her cousin, a life will be stolen and forced to be prisoned. The cousin will plan to regain her family and life.

== Cast and characters ==
Cast

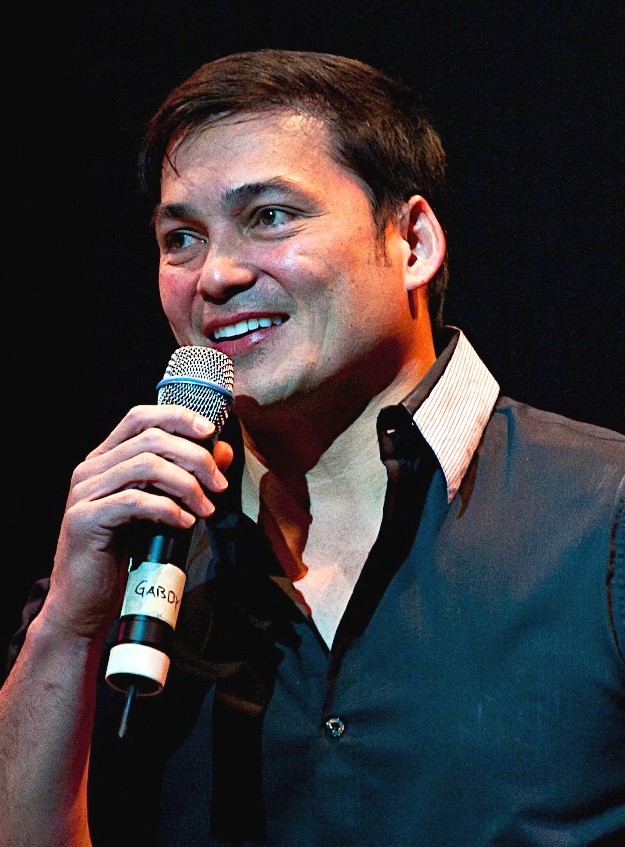
Gabby Concepcion

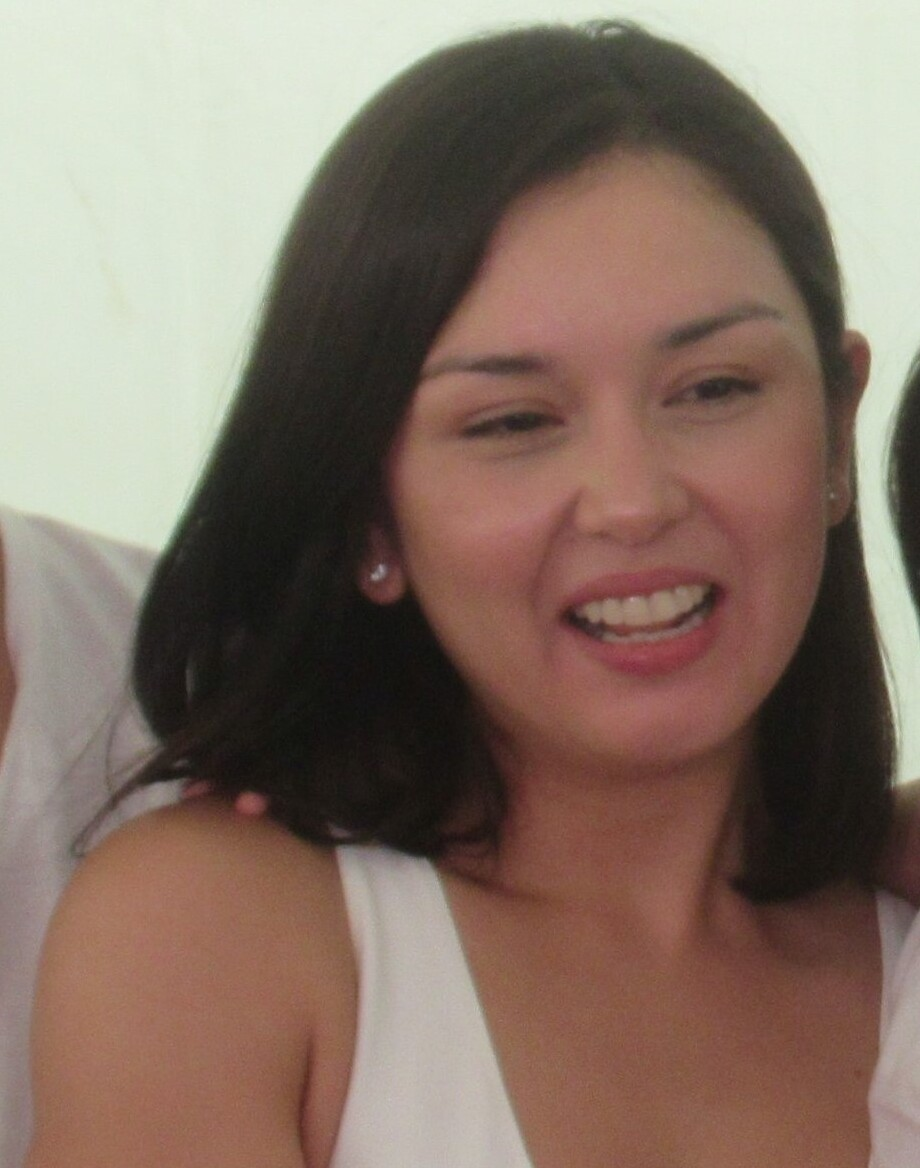
Beauty Gonzalez

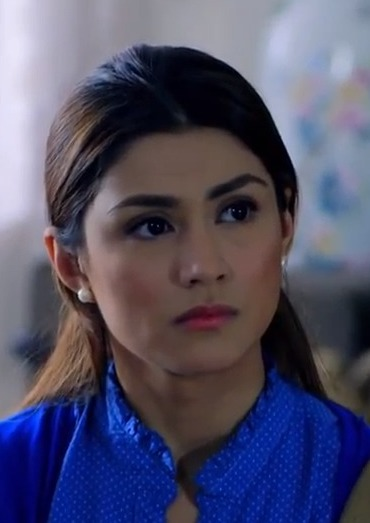
Carla Abellana

Lead cast

- Gabby Concepcion as Darius Rigor
- Beauty Gonzalez as Farrah Dela Cruz-Rigor / Lucy Hidalgo-Rigor
- Carla Abellana as Lucy Hidalgo-Rigor / Farrah Dela Cruz-Rigor

Supporting cast

- Celia Rodriguez as Azon "Mamita" Rigor
- Lovely Rivero as Belen Dimaculangan-Dela Cruz
- Anjo Damiles as Vince Rigor
- Patricia Ysmael as Apo Berta
- Divine Aucina as Joyce Constancia
- Juharra Zhianne Asayo as Cheska Rigor

Recurring cast

- Evelyn Santos as Biring
- Josh Ivan Morales as Isaac Centeno

Guest cast

- Mariz Ricketts as Rosa
- William Lorenzo as Ernesto Dela Cruz
- Bobby Andrews as Julian Hidalgo
- Sheila Marie Rodriguez as Maria Tessa Dela Cruz-Hidalgo
- Cassandra Lavarias as younger Lucy
- Dennah Bautista as younger Farrah
- Faye Lorenzo as Ingrid

== Production ==
Principal photography commenced in February 2023. Filming concluded in August 2023.

== Ratings ==
According to AGB Nielsen Philippines' Nationwide Urban Television Audience Measurement People in television homes, the pilot episode of Stolen Life earned an 8.4% rating. The final episode scored a 10.3% rating.

== Accolades ==
Accolades received by Stolen Life
Year	Award	Category	Recipient	Result	Ref.
2025	38th PMPC Star Awards for Television	Best Daytime TV Series	Stolen Life	Nominated	
2025	37th PMPC Star Awards for Television	Best Daytime TV Series	Stolen Life	Pending	
