= Mariane Osabel =

Filipino singer (born 1998)

- Born: Mariane Faith Ignacio Osabel; January 28, 1998 (age 28); Iligan City, Lanao del Norte, Philippines
- Other names: Mayang, Yanyan, Asia's Dragon Diva
- Education: Mindanao State University–Iligan Institute of Technology
- Occupation: Singer
- Years active: 2019–present
- Agent: Sparkle (2021–present)
- Known for: Semi-finalist – Tawag ng Tanghalan Season 3; Grand Champion – The Clash Season 4
- Children: 1
- Relatives: Arne Osabel (brother)
- Musical career
- Genres: OPM; pop
- Instrument: vocals
- Label: GMA Music (2022–present)
- Member of: Divas of the Queendom

Mariane Faith Ignacio Osabel (born January 28, 1998) is a Filipino singer. She was a semi-finalist in the third season of Tawag ng Tanghalan, a singing competition on the noontime show It's Showtime. She later won the fourth season of GMA Network's singing competition The Clash.

Osabel is a regular performer on the noontime variety show All-Out Sundays.

== Early life ==
Mariane Faith Ignacio Osabel was born on January 28, 1998, in Iligan City, Lanao del Norte. From 2005 to 2011, she spent part of her childhood living in Saudi Arabia with her family before returning to the Philippines to complete her education. Osabel is the eldest of her siblings, and her elder brother, Arne Osabel, is also a singer.

Osabel pursued her tertiary education at Mindanao State University–Iligan Institute of Technology (MSU-IIT), where she earned a Bachelor of Science (BS) in Environmental Engineering Technology (EnvET), graduating in 2022.

Before fully pursuing her music career on television, she was the lead vocalist of the local band, Echoes.

== Career ==
=== 2018–2019: Pre–Tawag ng Tanghalan and The Clash ===
Before joining television singing competitions, she competed in Adlaw sa Iligan Singing Star in 2018, where she emerged as the grand champion.

=== 2019: Tawag ng Tanghalan and Prior to The Clash ===
==== Daily Rounds (First Attempt) ====
On January 19, 2019, she competed in Quarter II of the third season of Tawag ng Tanghalan. For her first performance, she sang Bukas na Lang Kita Mamahalin by Lani Misalucha, winning as the daily champion. In the Face-off Round, she performed On the Wings of Love by Kyla but lost to the defending champion.

Tawag ng Tanghalan sa Showtime Season 3 Performances and Results
Week	Theme	Song	Original Artist	Date	Score	Result
Season 3 Week 15	n/a	"Bukas na Lang Kita Mamahalin"	Lani Misalucha	January 19, 2019	93.2	Daily Winner
Season 3 Week 15	n/a	"On the Wings of Love" (vs. Kim Nemenzo)	Kyla	January 19, 2019	93.0	Eliminated

==== Daily Rounds (Second Attempt) ====
On July 8, 2019, six months after her loss in Quarter II, she returned to compete in Quarter IV. For her first performance, she sang I Am Changing by Jennifer Holliday and won as the daily champion. In the Face-off Round, she performed Fallin' by Alicia Keys, securing her position as the defending champion. She successfully defended her title for five consecutive days, making her the fifth semi-finalist of the quarter. However, on her sixth day, she lost to the daily winner, ending her run as the defending champion.

Tawag ng Tanghalan sa Showtime Season 3 Performances and Results
Week	Theme	Song	Original Artist	Date	Score	Result
Season 3 Week 14	n/a	"I Am Changing"	Jennifer Holliday	July 8, 2019	95.6	Daily Winner
Season 3 Week 14	n/a	"Fallin'" (vs. John Erscel Galagar)	Alicia Keys	July 8, 2019	94.2	Defending Champion
Season 3 Week 14	n/a	"I Have Nothing" (vs. Mark Anthony Macapobre)	Whitney Houston	July 9, 2019	93.0	Defending Champion
Season 3 Week 14	n/a	"Saving All My Love for You" (vs. Princess Ane Ruga)	Whitney Houston	July 10, 2019	92.0	Defending Champion
Season 3 Week 14	n/a	"Akin Ka Na Lang" (vs. Leah Mae Valiente)	Morissette	July 11, 2019	92.4	Defending Champion
Season 3 Week 14	n/a	"And I'm Telling You I'm Not Going" (vs. Cherry Mae Acoba)	Jennifer Holliday	July 12, 2019	96.0	Defending Champion (enters to the Semi-finals)
Season 3 Week 15	n/a	"Isang Linggong Pag-ibig" (vs. Niña Jaro)	KZ Tandingan,	July 15, 2019	91.2	Lost but advanced to the Semi-finals

==== Semi-finals ====
During the weeklong semi-finals, originally scheduled for June 24–29, 2019, but later rescheduled to August 26–31, 2019, Osabel performed songs based on the theme of the day. She was followed by Shantal Cuizon, Alliyah Cadeliña, Jermaine Apil, Dior Lawrence Bronia, Julius Cawaling, and Violeta Bayawa. On the sixth day, Osabel earned a combined average score of 57.03%. However, she did not qualify for the Grand Finals and later returned for the Ultimate Resbak round.

Tawag ng Tanghalan sa Showtime Season 3 Performances and Results
Week	Theme	Song	Original Artist	Date	Score	Result
Season 3 Quarter IV Semi-finals	Round 1: Awiting Pangmalakasan	"Narito Ako"	Regine Velasquez	August 26, 2019	unrevealed	Advanced to the next round
Season 3 Quarter IV Semi-finals	Round 2: Awit ni Idol	"Ikot-Ikot"	Sarah Geronimo	August 27, 2019	N/A	Advanced to the next round
Season 3 Quarter IV Semi-finals	Round 3: OPM Hits	"Saan Darating ang Umaga"	Angeline Quinto	August 28, 2019	unrevealed	Advanced to the next round
Season 3 Quarter IV Semi-finals	Round 4: Throwback Tinig	"Try a Little Tenderness"	Ray Noble Orchestra	August 29, 2019	N/A	Advanced to the next round
Season 3 Quarter IV Semi-finals	Round 5: Hurados' Choice	"A Piece of Sky"	Barbra Streisand	August 30, 2019	N/A	Advanced to the next round
Season 3 Quarter IV Semi-finals	Round 6: Awit ng Buhay	"Who You Are"	Jessie J	August 31, 2019	57.03%	Advanced to the Ultimate Resbak

==== Ultimate Resbak ====
After failing to qualify for the Grand Finals, Osabel returned for the Resbak round, where she performed Who You Are and secured the Seat of Power alongside Windimie Yntong. On the fourth day, she selected Mariko Ledesma for the Sing-off. Osabel performed Run to You by Whitney Houston but lost to Ledesma, who took the Seat of Power and later advanced to the final round.

Tawag ng Tanghalan sa Showtime Season 3 Performances and Results
Week	Theme	Song	Original Artist	Date	Score	Result
Season 3 Ultimate Resbak	Seat of Power	"Who You Are"	Jessie J	September 6, 2019	100%	Declared as the Seat of Power
Season 3 Ultimate Resbak	Ultimate Resbak Week	"Run to You" (vs. Mariko Ledesma)	Whitney Houston	September 11, 2019	66.50%	Eliminated

=== 2019–2020: Post–Tawag ng Tanghalan and controversial TNT winning announcement ===
After the second round performance between Osabel and Mariko Ledesma, Ledesma claimed the Seat of Power, dethroning Osabel. However, after the winning moment, the screen displayed the split scoring, revealing both the public and judges' scores. Viewers noticed that Osabel received a judges' score of 16.50%, while Ledesma earned 50%. Alleging "rigged" results, netizens began using the hashtags #JusticeForMariane and #HustisyaParaKayMariane, which trended on Twitter, as users expressed their frustration and sentiments over the judges' scores.

On September 14, 2019, three days after the performances of Osabel and Ledesma, which aired on September 11, 2019, Tawag ng Tanghalan judge Dulce addressed the controversial result of Ledesma dethroning Osabel. She stated that Osabel sounded different live than what was broadcast but failed to explain the impossibly low score given to Osabel. Other individuals involved mentioned that the public was unaware of what transpired behind the scenes or the pressure the judges were under.

After the controversial result, Osabel withdrew from competing in the Final Resbak due to health issues, while Mariko Ledesma, one of the grand finalists for Huling Tapatan, also withdrew for personal reasons related to the backlash from netizens. In a 2021 virtual interview with LionHearTV, Osabel revealed that she became traumatized after not winning in Tawag ng Tanghalan and developed a fear of joining singing competitions.

=== 2021: The Clash ===
In 2020, the year after her Tawag ng Tanghalan journey and despite the controversy, Osabel auditioned for the third season of The Clash but did not pass. She re-auditioned for Season 4 in 2021 and was finally selected to compete in the fourth season.

Osabel participated in the fourth season of The Clash and was dubbed the "Ultimate Siren ng Iligan City." In her One-on-One round, she performed Paraisong Parisukat by Basil Valdez, advancing to the second round. In the grand finals, she faced Vilmark Viray in a one-on-one clash. Osabel performed an original composition, Bakit Mahal Pa Rin Kita, written by Harish Joya, while Viray performed Umuwi Ka Na. Osabel ultimately emerged as the grand champion of the fourth season of the Philippine reality singing competition The Clash.

The Clash Season 4 Performances and Results
Week	Theme	Song	Original Artist	Date	Result
Season 4 Episode 1	One on One	"Paraisong Parisukat" (vs. Kimberly Recto)	Basil Valdez	October 2, 2021	Advanced
Season 4 Episode 8	Laban Kung Laban	"It's a Man's Man's Man's World"	James Brown	October 24, 2021	Advanced
Season 4 Episode 12	Pares Kontra Pares	"Nakapagtataka" (with Mauie Francisco)	Hajji Alejandro	November 7, 2021	Advanced
Season 4 Episode 16	3 vs 3	"Respect/Ain't No Mountain High Enough" (with Julia Serad and Vilmark Viray)	Aretha Franklin/Diana Ross	November 21, 2021	Advanced
Season 4 Episode 18	Isa Laban Sa Lahat (Top 10)	"I Am Changing"	Jennifer Holliday	November 28, 2021	Advanced
Season 4 Episode 20	Isa Laban Sa Lahat (Top 8)	"Gaano Kadalas Ang Minsan"	Basil Valdez	December 5, 2021	Bottom 2
Season 4 Episode 20	Isa Laban Sa Lahat (Top 8)	"I Believe" (vs. Vilmark Viray)	Fantasia Barrino	December 5, 2021	Advanced
Season 4 Episode 21	Isa Laban Sa Lahat (Top 6)	"Don't You Worry 'bout a Thing"	Tori Kelly	December 11, 2021	Advanced
Season 4 Episode 23	Isa Laban Sa Lahat (Final Top 6)	"Who You Are/Mamma Knows Best"	Jessie J	December 18, 2021	Advanced (Top 5)
Season 4 Episode 24	The Final Clash (Final Top 5)	"Listen"	Beyoncé	December 19, 2021	Advanced (Final Top 2)
Season 4 Episode 24	The Final Clash (The Final One-on-One)	"Bakit Mahal Pa Rin Kita" (vs. Vilmark Viray)	Herself	December 19, 2021	Grand Champion

=== 2021–present: Post–The Clash and breakthrough ===
After becoming the grand champion of The Clash, Osabel became a mainstay of All-Out Sundays, specifically in the segment Queendom, alongside Lani Misalucha, Julie Anne San Jose, Rita Daniela, Hannah Precillas, and her fellow The Clash graduates.

On March 3, 2022, Osabel signed a contract with GMA Music, along with The Clash Season 4 first runner-up Vilmark Viray.

Osabel also signed a talent contract with Sparkle, along with several other artists, during the Signed for Stardom event on May 26, 2022.

==== Recording career and performances ====
Her debut single as a recording artist was "Bakit Mahal Pa Rin Kita" (2022) and featured on the album, The Clash 4 Finalists Sing Originals. She followed this with additional releases, including the single "Pira-Piraso" (2022). Osabel also performs regularly on the Sunday variety show All-Out Sundays, and is part of the featured vocal group Divas of the Queendom. She was among the performers of GMA-7’s station ID theme "Isa Sa Puso ng Pilipino" (2024) alongside other Kapuso artists.

== Personal life ==
On December 8, 2025, Osabel became engaged to Patrick Santos. They married in a civil wedding in Calamba City, Laguna on December 17, 2025. On January 8, 2026, Osabel announced that she is expecting her first child.

== Filmography ==
=== Television ===
Year	Title	Role	Notes	Ref.
2024	TiktoClock: Tanghalan ng Kampeon	Herself	Judge	
2024	It's Showtime	Herself	Guest Performer (EXpecially For You segment)	
2023–24	Kapuso Countdown to 2024: The GMA New Year Special	Herself	Performer	
2023	Fast Talk with Boy Abunda	Herself	Guest	
2023	The Clash season 5	Herself	Season 4 grand champion / Guest / Non-competition performer	
2022	Family Feud Philippines	Herself	Contestant / Team Queendom	
2022; 2023; 2024	TiktoClock	Herself	Guest / Performer / Player	
2022	NCAA Season 98: GMA NCAA All-Star Basketball Game	Herself	Guest / Performer	
2022	The Boobay and Tekla Show	Herself	Guest	
2022	NCAA Season 97: Opening Ceremony	Herself	Performer	
2022	Unang Hirit	Herself	Guest	
2022; 2023	Sarap, 'Di Ba?	Herself	Guest	
2021; 2022–present	All-Out Sundays	Herself	Guest (2021); Performer / Co-host (since 2022)	
2021–22	Kapuso Countdown to 2022: The GMA New Year Special	Herself	Performer	
2021; 2022	MARS Pa More	Herself	Guest	
2021	The Clash season 4	Herself	Contestant / Grand Champion	
2019	Tawag ng Tanghalan season 3	Herself	Contestant / Semi-finalist	

== Discography ==
=== Singles ===
List of singles, showing year released and album name
Year	Title	Album	Ref.
2021	"Bakit Mahal Pa Rin Kita"	The Clash 4 Finalists Sing Originals	
2022	"Pira-piraso"	Non-album singles	

=== Soundtrack ===
Year	Song	Film/Show	Ref.
2022	"Kahit Ano Pa ang Mangyari"	First Lady	
2022	"Bakit Mahal Pa Rin Kita"	The Penthouse: Season 3	
2022	"Ugnayan – Environment Theme"	Lolong	
2022	"Armando Jingle"	Lolong	
2022	"Simula"	Start-Up PH	
2023	"Kilala ng Puso"	Stolen Life	

== Concert ==
Date	Title	Co-headliners	Venue	Ref.
December 2, 2023	Queendom: Live	Julie Anne San Jose, Rita Daniela, Hannah Precillas, Thea Astley, Jessica Villarubin	Newport Performing Arts Theater	

== Awards and nominations ==
- 2023: 36th Awit Awards
  - New Female Recording Artist:
    - Pira-piraso – Winner
    - Bakit Mahal Pa Rin Kita – Nominated
  - Best Ballad Recording:
    - Bakit Mahal Pa Rin Kita (Executive producers: Felipe S. Yalong and Rene A. Salta, Record producer: Kedy Sanchez, Composer: Harish Joya) – Nominated

Awards and achievements
Preceded by Jessica Villarubin	The Clash; 2021 (season 4)	Succeeded by Rex Baculfo
