= Aloy Adlawan =

Filipino filmmaker and chemical engineer

Alfred Aloysius L. Adlawan (also credited as Aloy Adlawan), a chemical engineer by profession, is a multi-awarded Filipino filmmaker- writer, producer, director, composer. He attended filmmaking courses at the Mowelfund Film Institute in the Philippines and the New York Film Academy in New York City.

His award-winning works include the screenplays “Ang Babae sa Burol” (2nd place, Don Carlos Palanca Memorial Awards for Literature, 1994), “Ang Mga Ibon sa Dapithapon” (1st place, Film Development Foundation Scriptwriting Contest, 1995), and “Padyak” (3rd place, Don Carlos Palanca Memorial Awards for Literature, 2008); the short film “Si Lolo Tasyo at ang Araw” (3rd place, Gawad CCP for Alternative Film and Video, 1997), among others.

In 2005, he was among the finalists of the first Cinemalaya Independent Film Festival with his film Room Boy (as writer, producer, director) where Meryll Soriano won Best Actress. His horror film Ouija (writer) is 2007's biggest horror blockbuster, is awarded PinakaPasadong Dulang Pampeplikula at the 10th Pasado Gawad Sining Sine by the Pampelikulang Samahan ng mga Dalubguro and was nominated for Best Screenplay in various award-giving bodies. His film Signos (writer, producer, director) was awarded the Best Foreign Film at the 2007 Lone Star International Film Festival in Fort Worth, Texas, was given an Award of Excellence at the 2007 Accolade Film Competition in California, received the Bronze Foreign Film Award at The International Filmmaker Festival in U.K, and won Best International Thriller at the 2008 New York International Independent Film and Video Festival.

He recently won a National Commission on Culture and the Arts grant to his film Padyak under his own company Breaking.The.Box Productions.

== Filmography ==
- 2016 Imagine You and Me (co-writer)
- 2014 Third Eye (as screenplay and director)
- 2012 My Kontrabida Girl (as screenplay)
- 2011 My Valentine Girls (as screenplay)
- 2010 Dagaw (as screenplay)
- 2009 T2 (as screenplay)
- 2009 Sundo (as screenplay)
- 2009 Padyak (as screenplay and director)
- 2009 When I Met U (as screenplay)
- 2008 Condo (as screenplay and executive producer)
- 2007 3 Days of Darkness (as screenplay)
- 2007 Ouija (as screenplay)
- 2007 Signos (as screenplay, producer and director)
- 2005 Shake, Rattle and Roll 2k5 (as screenplay)
- 2005 Room Boy (as screenplay, producer and director)
- 2005 Happily Ever After (as screenplay)

== Television ==
- 2026: Taskforce Firewall (as creative director)
- 2026: Kamao (as creative director)
- 2026: The Master Cutter (as creative director)
- 2026: Born to Shine (as creative director)
- 2026: Apoy sa Dugo (as creative director)
- 2026: Never Say Die (as creative director)
- 2026: House of Lies (as creative director)
- 2025: Hating Kapatid (as creative director)
- 2025: Cruz vs Cruz (as creative director)
- 2025: Akusada (as creative director)
- 2025: Sanggang-Dikit FR (as creative director and creator)
- 2025: My Father's Wife (as creative director)
- 2025: Encantadia Chronicles: Sang'gre (as creative director)
- 2025: Slay (as creative director)
- 2025: Mommy Dearest (as creative director)
- 2025: Binibining Marikit (as creative director)
- 2025: Prinsesa ng City Jail (as creative director)
- 2025: Mga Batang Riles (as creative director)
- 2024: Forever Young (as creative director)
- 2024: Shining Inheritance (as creative director)
- 2024: Pulang Araw (as creative director)
- 2024: Widows' War (as creative director)
- 2024: My Guardian Alien (as creative director)
- 2024: Lilet Matias: Attorney-at-law (as creative director)
- 2024: Asawa ng Asawa Ko (as creative director)
- 2024: Love. Die. Repeat. (as creative director)
- 2023: Stolen Life (as creative director)
- 2023: The Missing Husband (as creative director)
- 2023: Love Before Sunrise (as creative director)
- 2023: Maging Sino Ka Man (as creative director)
- 2023: Magandang Dilag (as creative director)
- 2023: Royal Blood (as creative director)
- 2023: Walang Matigas na Pulis sa Matinik na Misis (as creative director)
- 2023: Voltes V: Legacy (as creative director)
- 2023:The Seed of Love (as creative director)
- 2023: Hearts on Ice (as creative director)
- 2023: AraBella (as creative director)
- 2023: Mga Lihim ni Urduja (as creative director)
- 2023: Underage (as creative director)
- 2022: Unica Hija (as creative director)
- 2022: Maria Clara at Ibarra (as creative director)
- 2022: Start-Up PH (as creative director)
- 2022: Nakarehas na Puso (as creative director)
- 2022: Abot-Kamay na Pangarap (as creative director)
- 2022: Return to Paradise (as creative director)
- 2022: The Fake Life (as creative director)
- 2022: Bolera (as creative director)
- 2022: False Positive (as creative director)
- 2022: Apoy sa Langit (as creative director)
- 2022: Raising Mamay (as creative director)
- 2022: Artikulo 247 (as creative director)
- 2022: Widows' Web (as creative director)
- 2022: First Lady (as creative director)
- 2022: Little Princess (as creative director)
- 2021: I Left My Heart in Sorsogon (as creative director)
- 2021: Las Hermanas (as creative director)
- 2021: To Have & to Hold (as creative director)
- 2021: Nagbabagang Luha (as creative director)
- 2021: Legal Wives (as creative director)
- 2021: The World Between Us (as creative director)
- 2021: Ang Dalawang Ikaw (as creative director)
- 2021: Agimat ng Agila (as creative director)
- 2021: Heartful Café (as creative director)
- 2021: First Yaya (as creative director)
- 2021: Babawiin Ko ang Lahat (as creative director)
- 2020: Descendants of the Sun (as creative director)
- 2020: Bilangin ang Bituin sa Langit (as creative director)
- 2020: Love of My Life (as creative director)
- 2020: Anak ni Waray vs. Anak ni Biday (as creative director)
- 2019: Hiram na Anak (as creative director)
- 2019: Inagaw na Bituin (as creative director)
- 2019: Kara Mia (as creative director)
- 2019: Dragon Lady (as creative director)
- 2019: Sahaya (as creative director)
- 2019: Bihag (as creative director)
- 2019: Love You Two (as creative director)
- 2019: Dahil sa Pag-ibig (as creative director)
- 2019: The Better Woman (as creative director)
- 2019: Hanggang sa Dulo ng Buhay Ko (as creative director)
- 2019: Prima Donnas (as creative director)
- 2019: Magkaagaw (as creative director)
- 2019: Madrasta (as creative director)
- 2019: Beautiful Justice (as creative director)
- 2019: The Gift (as creative director and creator)
- 2019: Asawa Ko, Karibal Ko (as creative director)
- 2019: Ika-5 Utos (as creative director)
- 2019: Onanay (as creative director)
- 2018: Sherlock Jr. (as creator)
- 2017: Super Ma'am (as creator)
- 2017: Haplos (as creator)
- 2017: Destined to be Yours (as creator)
- 2016: Alyas Robin Hood (as writer)
- 2015: Beautiful Strangers (as creator)
- 2014: My Destiny (as writer)
- 2014: Third Eye (as director)
- 2013: Paraiso Ko'y Ikaw (as developer)
- 2013: Genesis (as writer)
- 2012: Pahiram ng Sandali (as creator)
- 2012: The Good Daughter (as writer)
- 2011: Dwarfina (as writer)
- 2009: All My Life (as head writer)
- 2009: Paano Ba ang Mangarap? (as head writer)
- 2008: Magdusa Ka (as head writer)
- 2008: Maging Akin Ka Lamang (as writer)
- 2007: Boys Nxt Door (as creator and writer)
- 2006: Star Magic Presents (as writer, for episode Windows to the Heart
- 2006: Komiks (as writer, for episode Bampy)
