= Start-Up PH =

2022 Philippine television drama series

- Title card
- Genre: Romantic drama
- Based on: Start-Up (2020) by Park Hye-ryun
- Written by: Marlon Miguel; Patrick Ilagan
- Directed by: Jerry Lopez Sineneng; Dominic Zapata
- Creative director: Aloy Adlawan
- Starring: Alden Richards; Bea Alonzo; Yasmien Kurdi; Jeric Gonzales
- Theme music composer: Ann Margaret R. Figueroa
- Opening theme: "Simula" (instrumental)
- Ending theme: "Simula" by Mariane Osabel
- Country of origin: Philippines
- Original language: Tagalog
- No. of episodes: 65

Production
- Executive producers: Mona Coles-Mayuga; Winnie Holis-Reyes
- Production locations: Metro Manila, Philippines
- Camera setup: Multiple-camera setup
- Running time: 25–31 minutes
- Production companies: GMA Entertainment Group; Studio Dragon; CJ E&M

Original release
- Network: GMA Network
- Release: September 26 – December 23, 2022

Start-Up PH is a 2022 Philippine television drama romance series broadcast by GMA Network. The series is an adaptation of the 2020 South Korean television drama series Start-Up. Directed by Jerry Lopez Sineneng and Dominic Zapata, it stars Alden Richards, Bea Alonzo, Yasmien Kurdi and Jeric Gonzales. It premiered on September 26, 2022 on the network's Telebabad line up. The series concluded on December 23, 2022, with a total of 65 episodes.

The series is streaming online on YouTube.

== Cast and characters ==
Cast

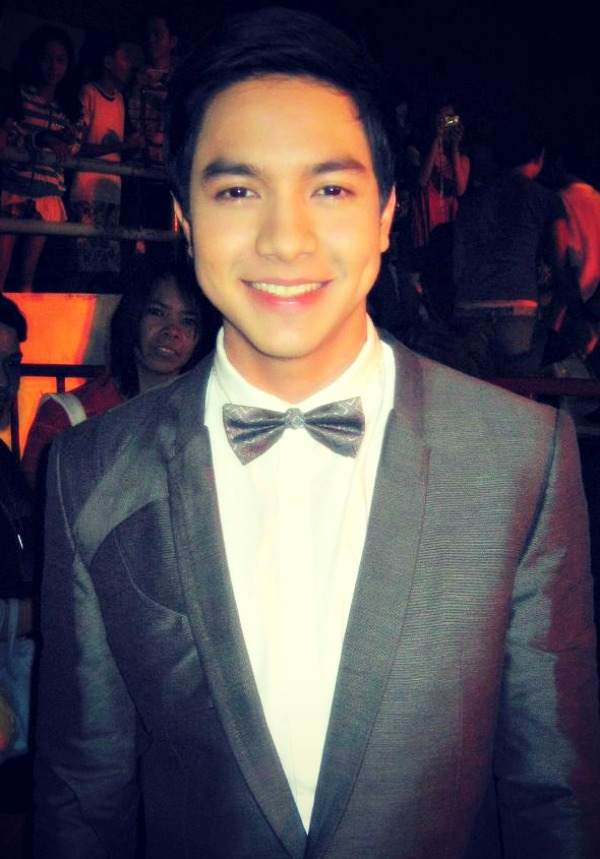
Alden Richards

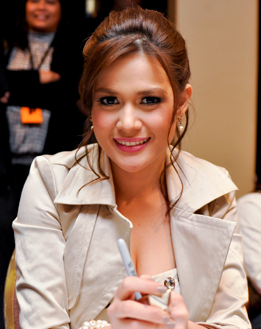
Bea Alonzo

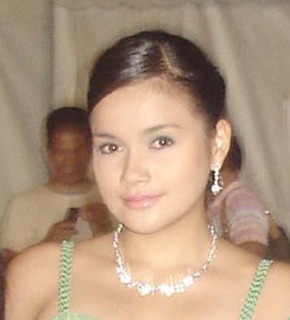
Yasmien Kurdi

Lead cast

- Alden Richards as Tristan "Good Boy" Hernandez
- Bea Alonzo as Danica "Dani" C. Sison-Hernandez
- Yasmien Kurdi as Katrina "Ina" C. Sison / Katrina "Ina" C. Diaz
- Jeric Gonzales as Davidson "Dave" Navarro

Supporting cast

- Gina Alajar as Ligaya "Joy" Sison
- Kim Domingo as Stephanie Rios
- Royce Cabrera as Jefferson "Jeff" Katipunan
- Boy 2 Quizon as Wilson Espiritu
- Ayen Munji-Laurel as Alicia "Alice" Cortez-Sison / Alicia "Alice" Cortez-Diaz
- Jackie Lou Blanco as Cassandra "Sandra" Castillejos-Yoon
- Gabby Eigenmann as Arnold Diaz
- Niño Muhlach as Samuel "Sammy" Navarro
- Lovely Rivero as Rhodora "Dang" Navarro
- Kevin Santos as Darwin Pascual
- Tim Yap as Angelo "Mr. A" Angeles
- Kaloy Tingcungco as Spencer Diaz
- Jay Arcilla as Angelo Joseph "Anjo" Perez
- Brianna Bunagan as Joanna "Joan" Perez

Guest cast

- Neil Ryan Sese as Romualdo "Chito" Sison
- Marco Masa as younger Tristan Hernandez
- Princess Aguilar as younger Danica Sison
- Dayara Shane as younger Katrina Sison
- Seth dela Cruz as younger Davidson Navarro
- Benjie Paras as himself
- Jojo Alejar as Master Mentor

== Production ==
Principal photography commenced on April 4, 2022.

== Ratings ==
According to AGB Nielsen Philippines' Nationwide Urban Television Audience Measurement People in television homes, the pilot episode of Start-Up PH earned a 9.7% rating. The final episode scored an 8.9% rating.
