= Lovely Rivero =

Filipino actress

- Born: Gineb Macalinao
- Occupation: Actress
- Years active: 1984–present

Gineb Macalinao, known professionally as Lovely Rivero, is a Filipino actress who started in the kiddie-show, Kaluskos Musmos in 1980 (second batch). She made a comeback in the late '80s as one of the mainstays of That's Entertainment and as a teenage actress in Baby Pascual and Associate's Chikas (1984) with Jaclyn Jose, Karla Kalua, Rachel Anne Wolfe and Tanya Gomez. Other film credit includes Sex Object (1985) with Stella "Pinky" Suarez Jr. and Julio Diaz.

In 1996–1998, she starred the time blocker soap Mukha Ng Buhay with Shintaro Valdez Pilar Pilapil and Bernadette Allyson for Vintage Television or Viva Television.

== Filmography ==
=== Film ===
Year	Title	Role	Note(s)	Ref(s).
1984	Chikas			
1985	Sex Object			
1990	Angel Cremenal			
1992	Itumba si Angel Delgado			
1992	Angelina: The Movie			
1992	Estribo Gang: The Jinggoy Sese Story			
1992	Kamay ni Cain			
1993	Silang Mga Sisiw sa Lansangan			
1993	Lethal Panther 2	Wife of Albert	Original title: Magkasangga sa Batas	
1993	Sgt. Alvarez: Ex-Marine			
1993	Manila Boy	Turko's hitwoman		
1994	Maestro Toribio: Sentensyador			
1994	Capt. Jack Nayra (Alas ng Makati Police)			
1994	Deo Dador: Berdugo ng Munti			
1994	Alyas Totoy: Kamay Na Bakal ng WPD			
1994	Chinatown 2: The Vigilantes			
1994	Dino Obrero: Haring Daga			
1995	Nestor Solis: Hari ng Oxo			
1995	Judge Max Asuncion: Hukom Bitay			
1995	Hatulan: Bilibid Boys 2			
1995	Gen. Tapia: Sa Nagbabagang Lupa			
1995	Alfredo Lim: Batas ng Maynila			
1995	Kandungan			
1996	Batang Estero			
1997	Kamandag Ko ang Papatay sa 'Yo	Emily		
1998	Pagbabalik ng Probinsyano	Julie		
1998	Gagawin Ko ang Lahat			
2001	Aagos ang Dugo	Emma		
2005	Nasaan Ka Man	Joven's mother		
2007	Sa Harap ng Panganib	Jasmin		
2010	666			
2013	Bahay ng Lagim			
2022	Yorme: The Isko Domagoso Story	Shermaine Santiago		
2022	Ako si Ninoy	Aurora Aquino		

=== Television / Digital Series ===
Year	Title	Role
1986–1996	That's Entertainment	Herself / Host / Performer
1996	Mukha ng Buhay	Emily
1996	Bayani	Gregoria de Jesús
2000	Maalaala Mo Kaya: Apples, Oranges & Bananas	Older Sister
2001	Recuerdo de Amor	Diana
2005–2006	Mga Anghel na Walang Langit	Pilar
2007	Komiks Presents: Pedro Penduko at ang mga Engkantao	Joy
2008	Zaido: Pulis Pangkalawakan	Mrs. Torres
2008	Codename: Asero	Myar
2009	Sine Novela: Kung Aagawin Mo Ang Lahat Sa Akin	Vicky
2010	Maalaala Mo Kaya: Headband	Amy
2011	Magic Palayok	Linda Sallave
2011	Maalaala Mo Kaya: Pasaporte	Grace
2012	Alice Bungisngis and her Wonder Walis	Tiya Panying
2013	Maalaala Mo Kaya: Gown	Oyang
2013	Magpakailanman: The Prolen Banacua Story	Virginia
2014	Magpakailanman: Nakakulong na Puso	Lisa
2014	Innamorata	Corazon "Cora" Isidro-Manansala
2014	Magpakailanman: Ang Nurse Na Mat Ikatlong Mata	Mama Rene
2015	Maynila: Happily Ever After	
2015	Magpakailanman: PO2 Ephraim Mejia Story	Helen
2015	The Half Sisters	Julie
2015	Beautiful Strangers	Imelda Rodriguez
2016	Once Again	Vicky
2017	Wish Ko Lang: Paghilom	Ms. Torquemada
2017–2018	The Good Son	Miriam De Guzman
2018	Maynila: Ganti ng Anak	Vivian
2018–2019	Playhouse	Cielo Reyes-Domingo
2019	Sahaya	Pantia Kamaya
2021	Maalaala Mo Kaya: Blouse	Zhenny Justol
2021	First Yaya	Viola
2021	Init sa Magdamag	Helen Salcedo
2021	Maalaala Mo Kaya: Dialysis Machine	Mila
2022	Mano Po Legacy: The Family Fortune	Mila Rose De Guia
2022	Mars Ravelo's Darna	Mrs. Vallesteros
2022	Start-Up PH	Rhodora "Dang" Navarro
2023	Nag-aapoy na Damdamin	Elena Salazar
2023–2024	Stolen Life	Belen Dimaculangan-Dela Cruz
2024	Widows' War	Vivian Trano†
2025–2026	Hating Kapatid	Adela
