= Bakit Mahal Pa Rin Kita =

Single by Mariane Osabel

from the album The Clash 4 Finalists Sing Originals
- Released: February 11, 2022
- Recorded: 2021
- Genre: Pop
- Length: 2:40
- Label: GMA Music
- Songwriter: Harish Joya
- Producer: Kedy Sanchez

Mariane Osabel singles chronology
"Bakit Mahal Pa Rin Kita" (2022)	"Kahit Ano Pa ang Mangyari" (2022)

"Bakit Mahal Pa Rin Kita" (transl. Why Do I Still Love You) is a debut single by Filipino singer Mariane Osabel. The song was written by Harish Joya and produced by Kedy Sanchez.

== Background and release ==
The song was written by Harish Joya and produced by Kedy Sanchez as Osabel's original song in the second of final one-on-one of the fourth season of The Clash. After performing Beyoncé's "Listen", Osabel received an exclusive management contract from GMA Network, music contract from GMA Music, talent contract from GMA Artist Center (now Sparkle), a brand new car, 1 million pesos, and a house and lot.

The official audio was released on February 11, 2022.

== Usage in media ==
It is locally used for the theme song of South Korean television series The Penthouse: Season 3.

== Track listing ==
- Digital download
1. "Bakit Mahal Pa Rin Kita"– 2:40

== Personnel ==
- Mariane Osabel – vocal
- Harish Joya – writer
- Marc Lopez – arranger

== Awards and nominations ==
Year	Awards ceremony	Category	Results	Refs
2023	36th Awit Awards	New Female Recording Artist	Won	
2023	36th Awit Awards	Best Ballad Recording	Nominated	
