= Gabriel Esperanssa =

17th-century rabbi at Safed

Gabriel Esperanssa, also spelled Esperanza or Esperança (Hebrew: גבריאל איספיראנסה) was a 17th-century rabbi at Safed. He was originally from Salonika, where he was a disciple of Daniel Estrumsa. He apparently assumed the name of a woman called Esperanssa (Spanish for "hope"), who adopted and educated him as an orphan.

He was an exceptional Talmudic scholar and had studied together with David Conforte in Salonica. He later became acquainted with Jonathan Galante, (father of Moses Galante of Jerusalem), in Safed. Esperanssa was contentious and dogmatic and engaged in a disputation with the Egyptian rabbi Mordecai ben Judah HaLevi. Esperanssa was at the helm of the re-establishment of the Jewish community of Safed a few years after the 1660 massacre. He served on the Safed rabbinate in 1677 and may have officiated as the chief rabbi of Safed at the time. He was one of the four people chosen by the Constantinople rabbinate to investigate the prophetic claims of Nathan of Gaza.

He left several works, but only the collectanea to the Pentateuch have been published. A few of his responsa have survived in citations.
