= 1996 in Norwegian television =

This is a list of Norwegian television related events from 1996.

== Events ==
- 18 May – The 41st Eurovision Song Contest is held at the Oslo Spektrum in Oslo. Ireland wins the contest with the song "The Voice", performed by Eimear Quinn.
- 20 September – Debut of Stjerner i sikte, a series hosted by Jahn Teigen in which members of the public impersonate their favourite singers.
- Unknown – The first series of Stjerner i sikte is won by Odd Einar Nordheim performing as Terence Trent D'Arby.

== Debuts ==
- 20 September – Stjerner i sikte (1996–2002)

=== International ===
- (United States) Friends (Unknown)

== Television shows ==
=== 1990s ===
- Sesam Stasjon (1991–1999)

== Networks and services ==
=== Launches ===
Network	Type	Launch date	Notes	Source
Sportkanalen	Cable television	23 March		
NRK2	Cable television	1 September		

=== Closures ===
Network	Type	End date	Notes	Sources
ZTV Norway	Cable television	1 July		
Sportkanalen	Cable television	30 December		

== See also ==
- 1996 in Norway
