= La Esperanza (prison) =

Maximum security prison in El Salvador

- Interactive map of La Esperanza
- Location: San Salvador, El Salvador; 13.757°N 89.190°W
- Status: Operational
- Security class: Maximum security prison
- Capacity: 10,000
- Population: 33,000 (2023)
- Opened: 1972
- Managed by: Ministry of Justice and Public Security

La Esperanza, also known as Mariona, is a prison in El Salvador. Located on the northern outskirts of the city of San Salvador, it was the largest prison in El Salvador before the opening of the Terrorism Confinement Center (CECOT), with a population of 33,000 in 2023. (Note: El Salvador opens 40,000-person prison as arrests soar in gang crackdown, Reuters, February 1, 2023, https://www.reuters.com/world/americas/el-salvador-opens-40000-person-prison-arrests-soar-gang-crackdown-2023-02-01/. Quote: "El Salvador's largest prison, La Esperanza, currently holds 33,000 people despite having a capacity of 10,000.")
