= Esperança (non-profit) =

US-based non-profit organization

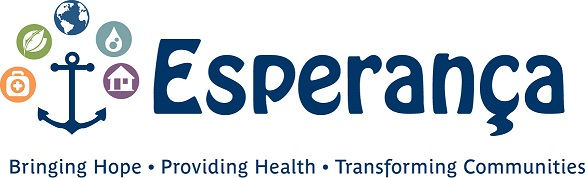
- Formation: 1970
- Type: NGO
- Legal status: 501(c)(3) nonprofit
- Headquarters: Phoenix, Arizona
- Location: Arizona (Phoenix)
- Interim President/CEO: Jeri Royce
- Staff: 11
- Website: http://www.esperanca.org

Esperança, the Portuguese word for hope, is a registered 501(c)(3) based in Phoenix, Arizona, United States. Founded in 1970 by Luke and Gerald Tupper. It currently operates programs in Mexico, Nicaragua, Bolivia, Peru, Mozambique and Phoenix, Arizona.

== History ==
James Tupper, a recent graduate from the Medical College of Wisconsin, got his first look at medical deprivation and poverty in 1960 while traveling to Antarctica aboard a U.S. Navy ice-breaker. The ship docked in Brazil. It was here where James was struck by those suffering from treatable diseases.

When his military service was completed, he entered the Franciscan Order. He chose the name Luke to reflect his dedication to serving those in need with his medical expertise.

Luke Tupper's brother, Gerald Tupper, was a lawyer in Phoenix and formally incorporated Esperança into a non-profit in 1970. For the first 15 years Esperança operated out of a room in Gerald's law office. Esperança moved to its permanent central Phoenix location in 1985.

== Project areas ==
=== Volunteer surgical program ===
Medical missions are one of the focuses of Esperança. Due to his training in the medical field, Luke Tupper focused on providing medical services to those in need. In 1972 Esperança purchased the Point Loma Ferry. The ship was originally used for transporting passengers to and from Southern California's Coronado Island. Esperanca relocated the vessel to Brazil and it became a floating hospital providing treatment to the underserved. Parts of the USS Bunker Hill (CV-17), a decommissioned aircraft carrier, were donated in order to convert the ship into a floating hospital. The surgical program expanded into Bolivia in 1985 and terminated the program in 2014, once the native partner organization was self-sustaining.

Currently, the surgical program operates in Nicaragua and Peru. Medical professionals volunteer their time to provide surgeries to communities in need. Volunteer surgeons, anesthesiologists, and nurses procure their own medical supplies, as well as accommodate their own airfare and volunteer their time to fly through the night and provide lifesaving surgery. Each volunteer surgical team travels approximately ten days, accomplishes between 25 and 45 surgeries, and can evaluate hundreds to be referred for other medical treatments

=== Medical supplies ===
Esperança's Medical Supply Donation program delivers three cargo containers per year, carrying medical donations to under-resourced hospitals, clinics, and community health centers in Jinotega, Nicaragua - one of the most impoverished areas in Central America. Esperança's on-site assessment process ensures that every container delivered will meet specific needs of the recipient hospital or clinic, equipping the medical staff with life-saving tools to improve diagnosis, treatment, and care. Supplies are then used by their volunteer surgical teams on their mission trips.

Each year, nearly 600 individuals, organizations, and corporations donate unused or gently used medical supplies and medical equipment that Esperança delivers to Nicaragua to support the severely resource- challenged communities to save lives, make diagnoses, and provide lifesaving surgeries. These supplies and equipment are essential to ensure that Esperança's partnering hospitals and clinics are equipped throughout the year with tools to transform lives.

=== Phoenix Program ===
The Phoenix Program began in 1999 and currently provides health education on oral health, nutrition, fitness, and chronic disease management to uninsured and under-insured children and families. Families are also referred to low-cost health resources and services. Education for adults includes evidence based curriculum informing community members on how to prepare healthy culturally appropriate meals. In addition, a similar curriculum is in development for elementary aged children. Esperança's work in Phoenix provides Promotores (Community Health Workers) opportunities to exchange information, share best practices and build skills. Salud con Sabor Latino (Health with a Latin Flavor) works to connect a network of Promotores and expand leadership opportunities for community members.

=== Water and sanitation ===
Recent water and sanitation projects have been developed with the assistance of the Ira A. Fulton Schools of Engineering. Communities are built around access to clean water through community wells, water systems and latrines. Each benefiting family participates in the construction of their water system, which in turn creates a personal ownership connection towards improving their health.

=== Nutrition and food security ===
In 1977 Esperança moved from a curative approach to a preventive model of treatment. The program originated in Brazil and focused on nutrition, including education for mothers as well as recording the weight of their preschool aged children. The program has since expanded to Nicaragua, Peru, Bolivia, and Mozambique.

Esperança invests in education and food-related micro-business that directly provide adequate sources of nutrition while simultaneously yielding profit from excess eggs, milk, grain, livestock, and crops.

These profits are often used to purchase additional food, replace the mud walls of homes, send children to school, gain access to clean water, or obtain needed medical care.

The following 2016 outcomes are notable in improving food security:

- 1,763 agricultural producers received training to increase and expand crop yield
- 122,576 pounds of food were distributed to 4,280 individuals
- 845 heads of households attended training on nutrition and improving their diets.

=== Disease prevention and treatment ===
Esperança is currently working on the prevention and treatment of Chagas disease in Bolivia.

== Financial accountability ==
Esperança currently has a four star rating by Charity Navigator. The organization is currently funded through a combination of grants from private foundations and individual contributions. The United States Agency for International Development has also supported past projects.
