= Esperança, Paraíba =

Coordinates: 7.02278°S 35.5975°W

- Municipality
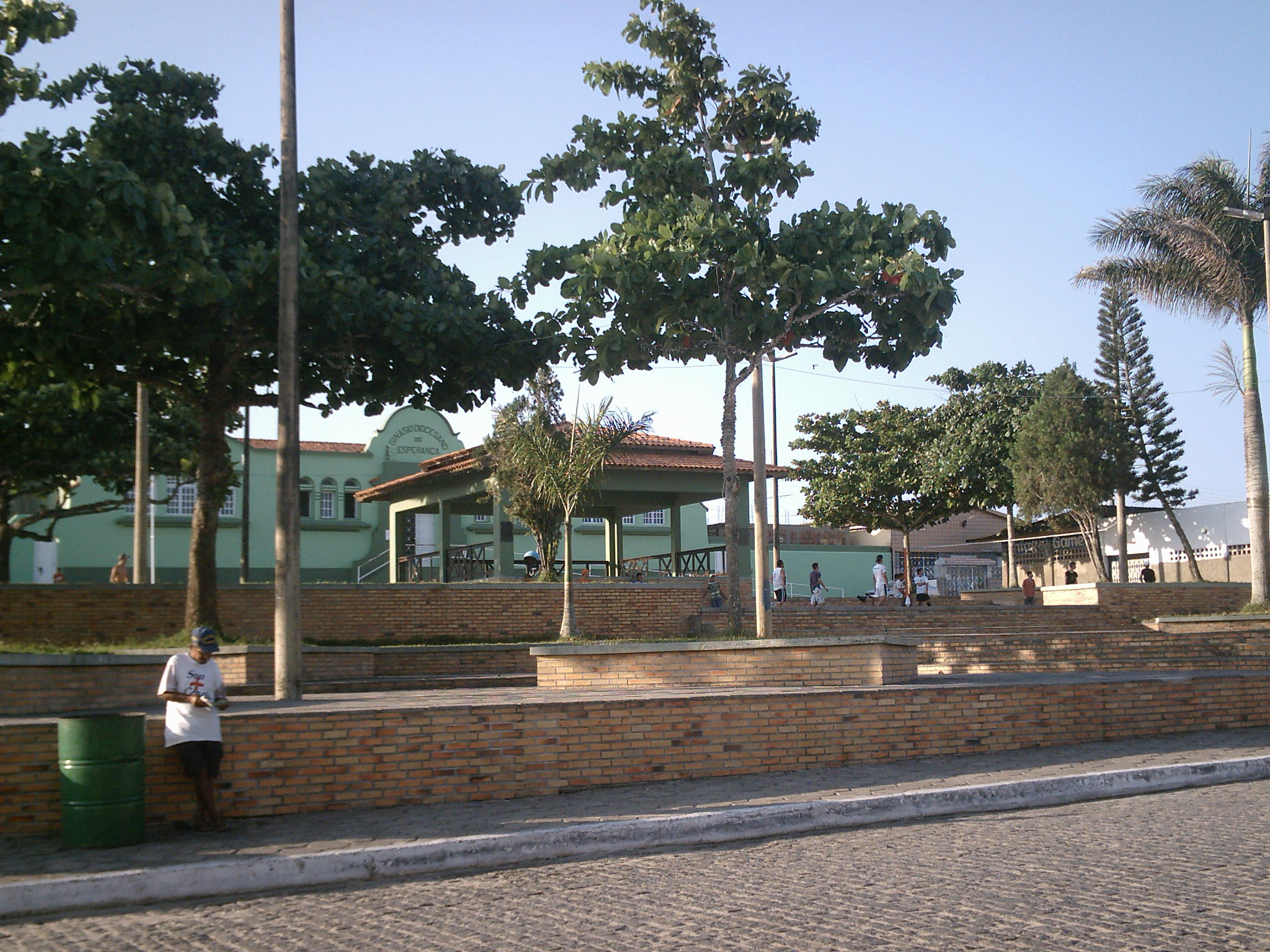

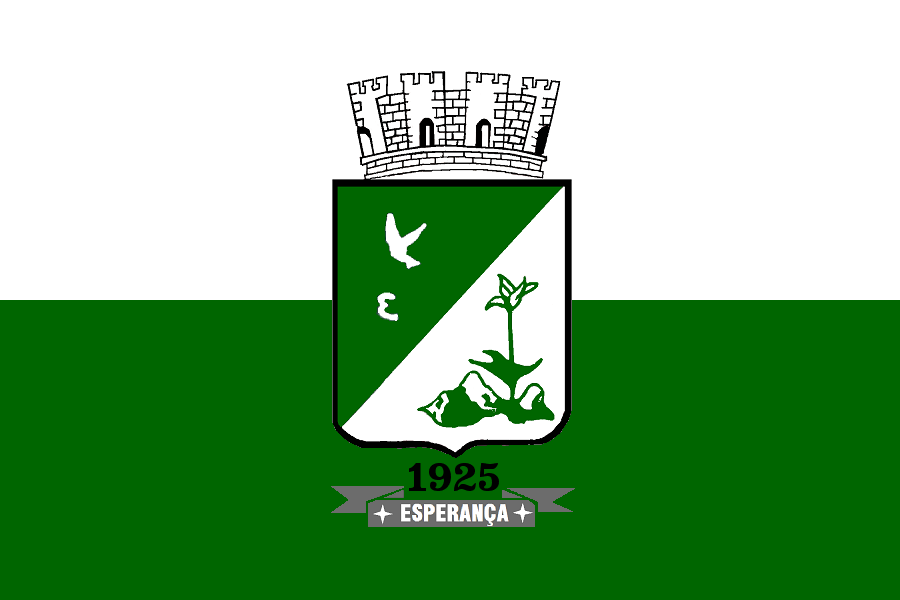
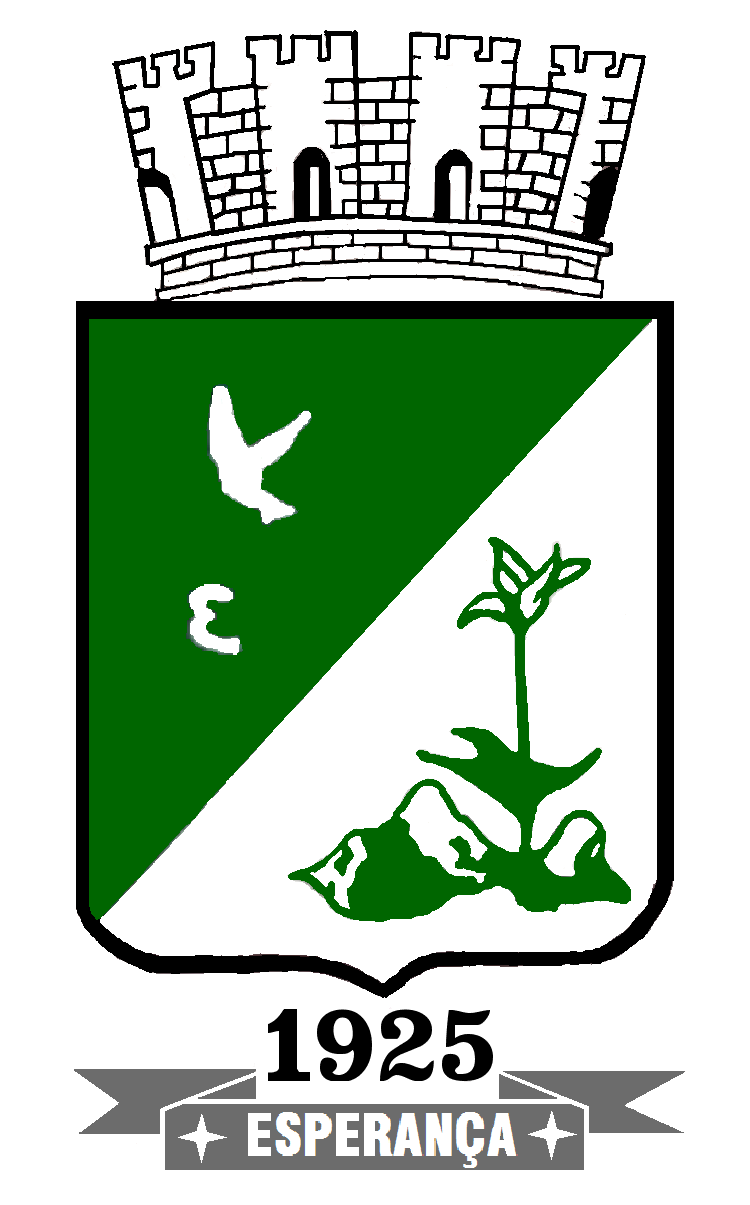
- Flag Coat of arms
- Interactive map of Esperança, Paraíba
- Country: Brazil
- Region: Northeast
- State: Paraíba
- Mesoregion: Agreste Paraibano

Population (2020)
  - Total: 33,199
- Time zone: UTC−3 (BRT)

Esperança (Central northeastern portuguese pronunciation: [ispɛˈrɐ̃sɐ]) is a municipality in the state of Paraíba in the Northeast Region of Brazil.

== See also ==
- List of municipalities in Paraíba
