= Mukha ng Buhay =

- Genre: Drama
- Created by: Viva Television
- Developed by: Viva Television
- Written by: R.J. Nuevas
- Directed by: Jeffrey Jeturian
- Starring: Lovely Rivero; Pilar Pilapil; Bernadette Allyson; Shintaro Valdez
- Theme music composer: Vehnee Saturno
- Opening theme: "Mukha ng Buhay" by Donna Cruz
- Ending theme: "Mukha ng Buhay" by Donna Cruz
- Country of origin: Philippines
- Original language: Tagalog

Production
- Executive producer: Vic del Rosario
- Producer: Veronique del Rosario-Corpus
- Running time: 30 minutes

Original release
- Network: PTV; RPN
- Release: April 15, 1996 – January 29, 1999

Related
- Tierra Sangre

Mukha ng Buhay is a Philippine television drama series broadcast by PTV and RPN. Directed by Jeffrey Jeturian, it stars Lovely Rivero, Pilar Pilapil, Bernadette Allyson and Shintaro Valdez. It aired from April 15, 1996, to January 29, 1999.

Internationally it has been syndicated through MavShack a website featuring Filipino Viva Films Library of collections of classic films and licensed brands from the company since 2013. In 2017, the series is currently rerunning on Sari-Sari Channel.

== Plot ==
The story is all about the faces of life, in dealing with love, friendship, death and family. Starting with the relationship of Emily and Eric. Emily was just a maid at the household of the rich Amanda, the mother of Eric. But the two fell in love with each other. Of course, Amanda doesn't approve this. But still, the two got married. Amanda started to make Emily's life miserable, with the help of her friend Betsay and cousin Carol. Meanwhile, Lani, a very kind-hearted daughter, experiences hardships because of her status in life, and her father, who is a gambler. At least she had her friends Bebang and Inoy to comfort her, not knowing that Inoy has eyes on her, and Bebang has eyes on him. Emily and Lani will meet when Lani applied to be a maid at their household. Will the two overcome their hardships in life?

== Cast ==
Main cast

- Lovely Rivero as Emily
- Shintaro Valdez as Eric
- Bernadette Allyson as Lani
- Pilar Pilapil as Amanda

Supporting cast

- Ruby Moreno as Joyce
- Nonie Buencamino as Emilio
- Wowie de Guzman as Enrique
- Anthony Cortes as Inoy
- Idelle Martinez as Dianne
- Ester Chaves as Manang Munding
- Lee Robin Salazar as Luigi
- Junior Paronda as Boying
- Aura Mijares as Nana Tansing
- Kathy Arguelles as Bebang

Extended cast

- Marianne dela Riva as Carol
- Vangie Labalan as Bebang's mom
- Charina Scott as Dee-dee
- Renato del Prado as Mang Gustin

== Staff ==
Writer: RJ Nuevas Lightning Director: Monino Duque Associate Producer: Emma Regina Llamas Supervising Producer: Olive de Jesus Producer: Veronique del Rosario-Corpus Executive Producer: Vic del Rosario, Jr. Director: Jeffrey Jeturian

== See also ==
- List of programs previously broadcast by Radio Philippines Network
- List of programs broadcast by People's Television Network
