= The Kris Aquino Show =

Philippine television talk show

- Genre: Talk show
- Presented by: Kris Aquino
- Country of origin: Philippines
- Original language: Tagalog

Production
- Camera setup: Multiple-camera setup
- Production company: Viva Television

Original release
- Network: People's Television Network (April 15, 1996 – August 9, 1996); GMA Network (August 12, 1996 – October 25, 1996)
- Release: April 15 – October 25, 1996

The Kris Aquino Show is a 1996 Philippine television talk show broadcast by GMA Network. Hosted by Kris Aquino, it premiered on PTV on April 15, 1996. The show moved to GMA Network on August 12, 1996. The show concluded on October 25, 1996.
