= Tierra Sangre =

- Genre: Soap opera
- Created by: Viva Television
- Developed by: Viva Television
- Written by: Suzette Doctolero; Galo Ador, Jr.
- Directed by: Gil Tejada Jr.
- Starring: Charito Solis; Bobby Andrews; Jennifer Sevilla
- Theme music composer: Vehnee Saturno
- Opening theme: "Tierra Sangre" by Rockstar 2/Arkasia
- Ending theme: "Tierra Sangre" by Rockstar 2/Arkasia
- Country of origin: Philippines
- Original language: Tagalog

Production
- Executive producer: Vic del Rosario Jr.
- Producer: Veronique del Rosario-Corpus
- Running time: 30 minutes

Original release
- Network: PTV; RPN
- Release: April 15, 1996 – February 12, 1999

Related
- Villa Quintana

Tierra Sangre is a Philippine television drama series broadcast by PTV and RPN. Directed by Gil Tejada Jr., it stars Charito Solis, Bobby Andrews and Jennifer Sevilla. It aired from April 15, 1996 to February 12, 1999.

== Cast ==
=== Sangre family ===
- Charito Solis as Doña Alfonsita Sangre (the matriarch)
- Bobby Andrews as Cesar Sangre (son of Miguel and Aurora)
- Dexter Doria as Margarita Sangre (wife of Juancho)
- Melissa Mendez as Soledad Sangre (wife of Miguel)
- Chesca Diaz as Minerva Sangre (daughter of Miguel and Aurora)
- Orestes Ojeda as Miguel Sangre (most trusted son of Alfonsita)
- Michelle Chuang as Cathy Sangre (daughter of Margarita and Juancho)
- Rez Cortez as Juancho Sangre (the son of Alfonsita)
- Michael Gomez as Allan Sangre (son of Margarita and Juancho)

=== De Asis family (the illegitimate Sangres) ===
- Jennifer Sevilla as Jean de Asis
- Kim delos Santos as Jeanette de Asis
- Melisse "Mumay" Santiago as Julie de Asis

=== Friends of the De Asis family ===
- Mymy Davao as Rebecca
- Sherry Lara as Yuning

=== Other cast ===
- Amy Robles as Manang Basyon
- Ama Quiambao
- Erwin Pelino as Intoy

== See also ==
- List of programs broadcast by People's Television Network
- List of programs previously broadcast by Radio Philippines Network
