= Grace Tanfelix =

Filipino social media personality

- Born: Mary Grace Torrejos; June 17, 1977 (age 49)
- Occupations: Social media personality; content creator
- Known for: "Okay na 'to" catchphrase
- Spouse: Gary Tanfelix
- Children: 2 (including Miguel Tanfelix)

Mary Grace Torrejos-Tanfelix (née Torrejos; born June 17, 1977), also known as "Mommy Grace", is a Filipino social media personality and content creator. She is known for her cooking vlogs and the catchphrase "Okay na 'to" (transl. This is okay). She is the mother of actor Miguel Tanfelix.

== Personal life ==
Grace Tanfelix was born as Mary Grace Torrejos on June 17, 1977. She is married to Gary Tanfelix. They have two sons, the actor Miguel Tanfelix and Yuan Tanfelix. The family resides in a compound in Cavite, and they also maintain a home in Parañaque.

Before her online career, Tanfelix worked as a preschool teacher. She resigned from her teaching job in 2004 when her son Miguel joined the reality show StarStruck Kids. She chose to become a full-time housewife and acted as her son's guardian and personal assistant during his early career.

== Online career ==
Tanfelix began creating content in 2022. She started recording videos while cooking large portions of food for her family and the construction workers renovating their kitchen. Her videos typically feature simple Filipino dishes and the use of common kitchen utensils.

Her son Miguel initially expressed hesitation regarding her entry into social media due to concerns about potential online bashing, but he eventually supported her endeavors. Miguel later took on the role of her talent handler for brand inquiries. According to Miguel, the idea to focus on ASMR-style cooking videos originated from his mother.

Her content became viral for her deadpan delivery of the line "Okay na 'to" at the end of her cooking videos. The phrase became a subject of internet memes and trends on TikTok in the Philippines. As of February 2025, she had 2.4 million followers on Facebook. By November 2025, her following on the platform grew to over 5 million.

In August 2025, Tanfelix was named one of the "Top 50 Best Food Vloggers" in the Philippines, ranking at number nine.

== Media appearances ==
In February 2025, Tanfelix made her television acting debut in the GMA Network series Mga Batang Riles. She appeared in a cameo role alongside her son.

== Filmography ==
Year	Title	Role	Notes
2025	Mga Batang Riles	Herself	Cameo appearance / Television debut
