= Wish I May (TV series) =

2016 Philippine television drama series

- Title card
- Genre: Romantic drama
- Created by: Renei Dimla
- Written by: John Kenneth De Leon; Renie Dimla; Tina Velasco; Liberty Trinidad
- Directed by: Neal del Rosario
- Creative director: Roy Iglesias
- Starring: Bianca Umali; Miguel Tanfelix
- Theme music composer: Agatha Obar
- Opening theme: "Wish I May" by Alden Richards
- Country of origin: Philippines
- Original language: Tagalog
- No. of episodes: 88 (list of episodes)

Production
- Executive producer: Joseph T. Aleta
- Production locations: Manila, Philippines
- Editors: Vincent Valenzuela; Sony Custado; Bot Tana
- Camera setup: Multiple-camera setup
- Running time: 21–35 minutes
- Production company: GMA Entertainment TV

Original release
- Network: GMA Network
- Release: January 18 – May 20, 2016

Wish I May is a 2016 Philippine television drama romance series broadcast by GMA Network. Directed by Neal del Rosario, it stars Bianca Umali and Miguel Tanfelix. It premiered on January 18, 2016 on the network's Afternoon Prime line up. The series concluded on May 20, 2016, with a total of 88 episodes.

The series is originally titled as Maybe This Time. The series is streaming online on YouTube.

== Premise ==
Olivia will be separated from her daughter, Carina because of her parents. In time, they will eventually meet. Though due to her sickness chimerism, she will continue to be separated from Carina. Olivia will also meet Clark again — the person she loves who is the father of Tristan, who will become a close friend of Carina.

== Cast and characters ==
Cast

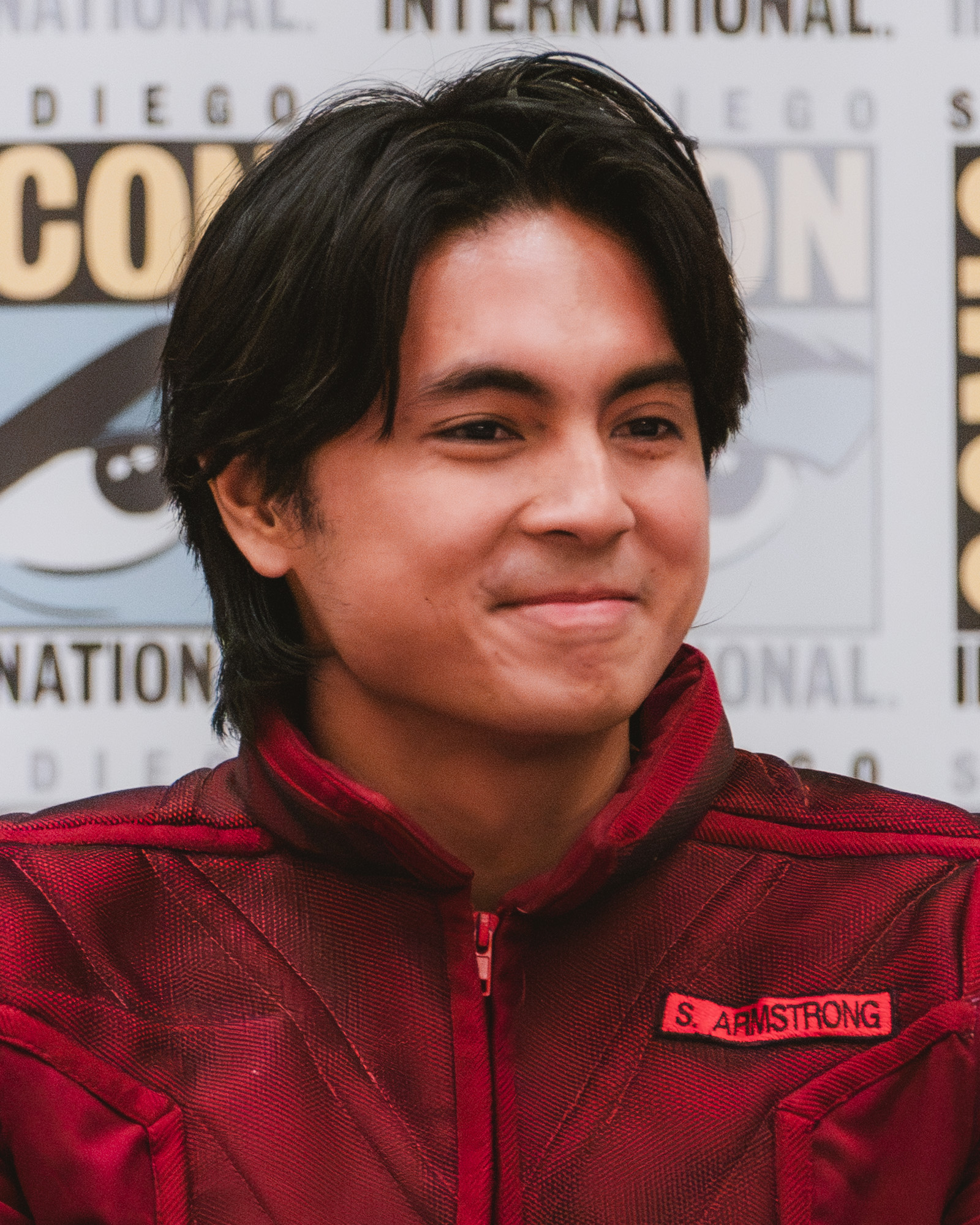
Miguel Tanfelix

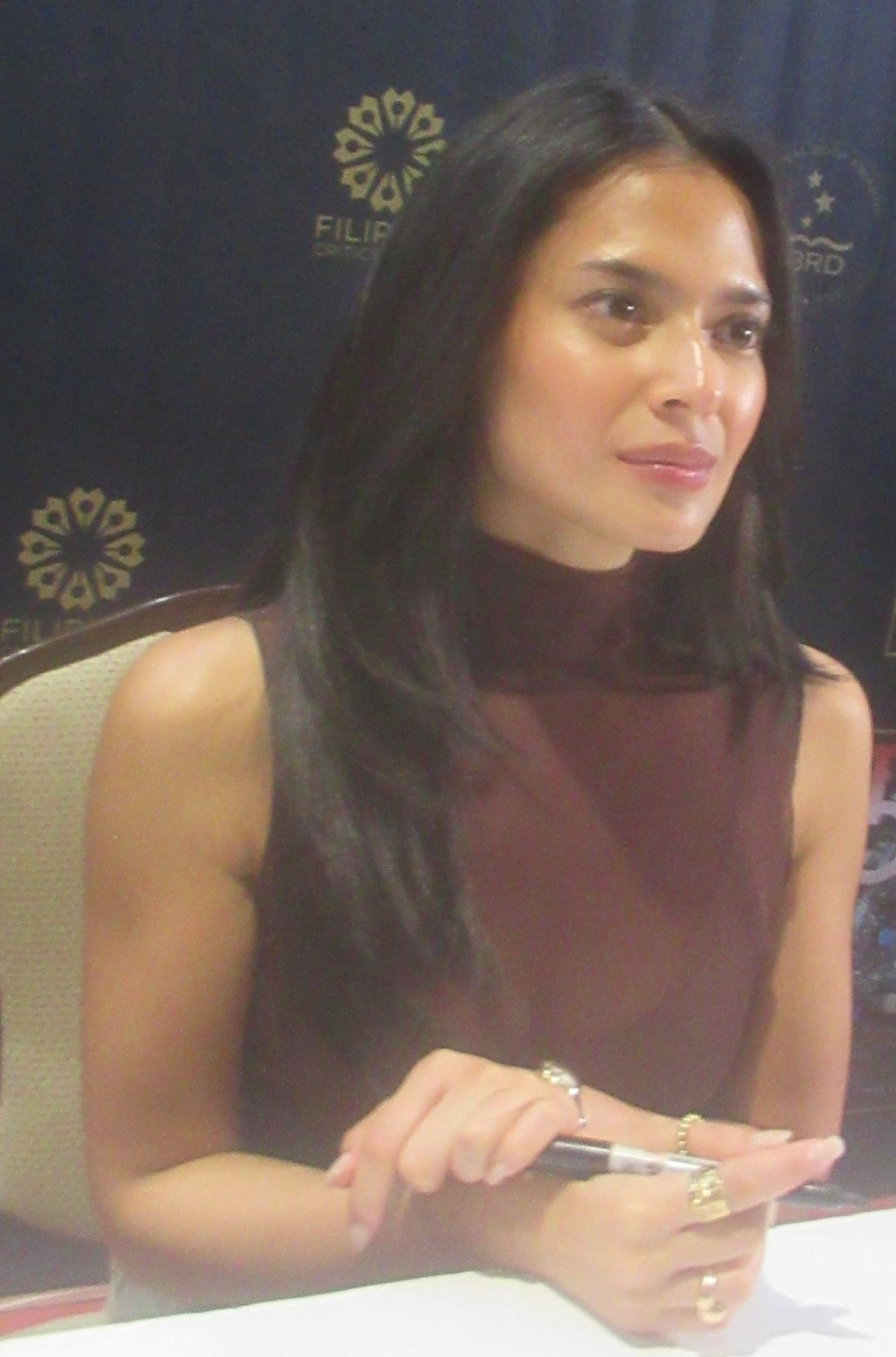
Bianca Umali

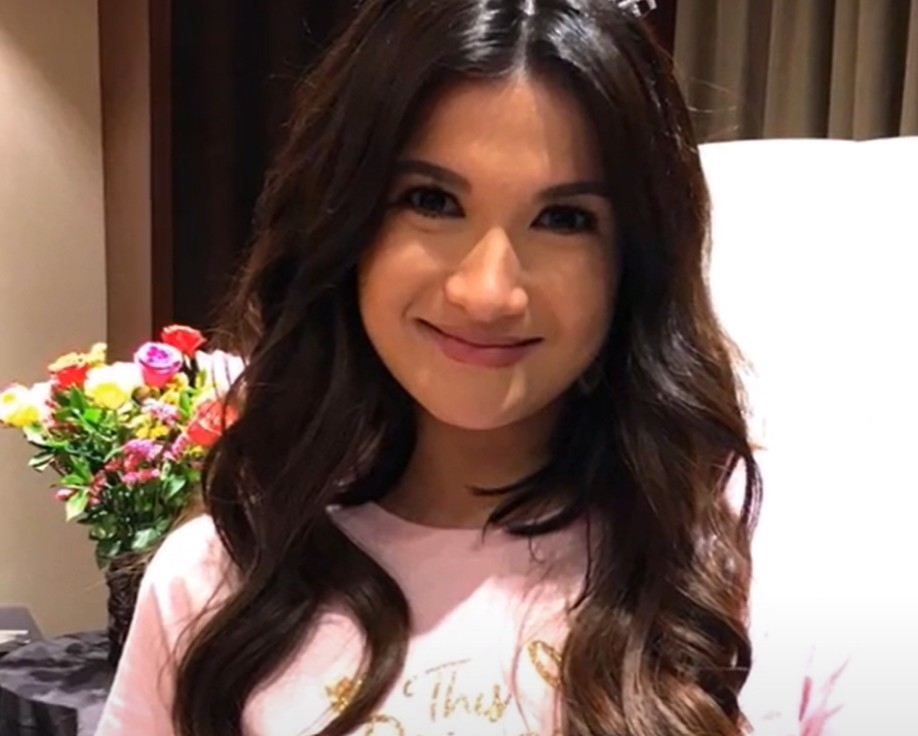
Camille Prats

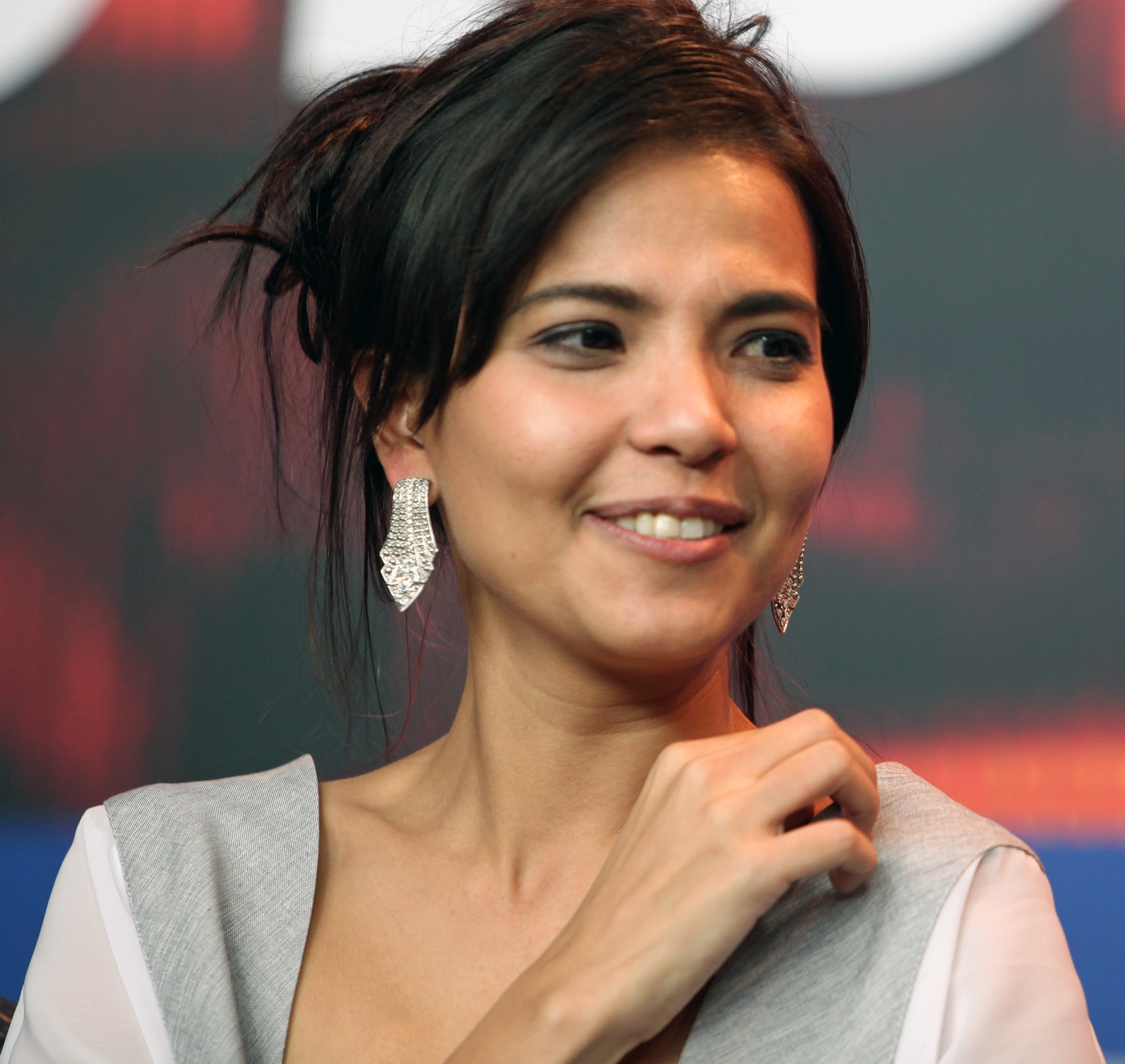
Alessandra De Rossi

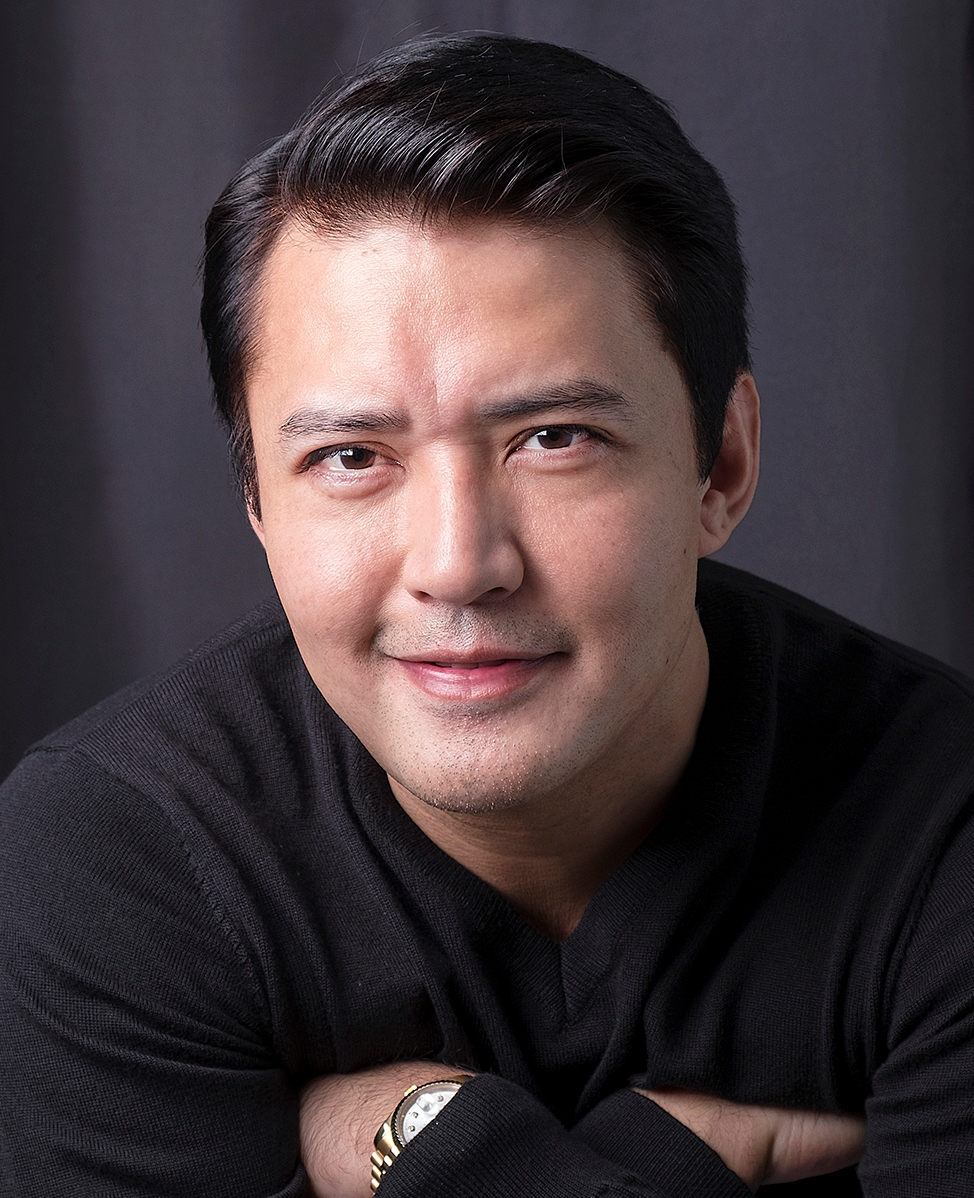
Mark Anthony Fernandez

Lead cast

- Bianca Umali as Carina "Cacai" Pizarro Gomez
- Miguel Tanfelix as Tristan "Tan-tan" Ramos Buenavista

Supporting cast

- Camille Prats as Olivia Pizarro-Gomez
- Mark Anthony Fernandez as Clark Gomez
- Alessandra De Rossi as Loretta Atienza-Vergara
- Rochelle Pangilinan as Audrey Ramos
- Glydel Mercado as Barbara Pizarro
- Neil Ryan Sese as Gabo Villafuerte
- Ash Ortega as Eunice Montes
- Sancho Delas Alas as Toper
- Prince Villanueva as Dave Montes
- Sandy Talag as Donna
- Aifha Medina as Jeanette
- Marnie Lapus as Doris

Guest cast

- Juan Rodrigo as Edward Pizarro
- Mark Herras as Andrew Vergara
- Franco Lagusad as Bernard Labangon
- Mon Confiado as Chua
- Arthur Solinap as Carlos Buenavista
- Eva Darren as Mamita Linsangan
- TJ Trinidad as Lance Delgado
- Lovely Abella as Meryl
- Dale Rossly as Nikki
- Mayton Eugenio as Paula

== Production ==
Principal photography commenced in September 2015.

== Ratings ==
According to AGB Nielsen Philippines' Mega Manila household television ratings, the pilot episode of Wish I May earned a 17.1% rating. The final episode scored an 18.4% rating.
