= Miguel Tanfelix =

Filipino actor

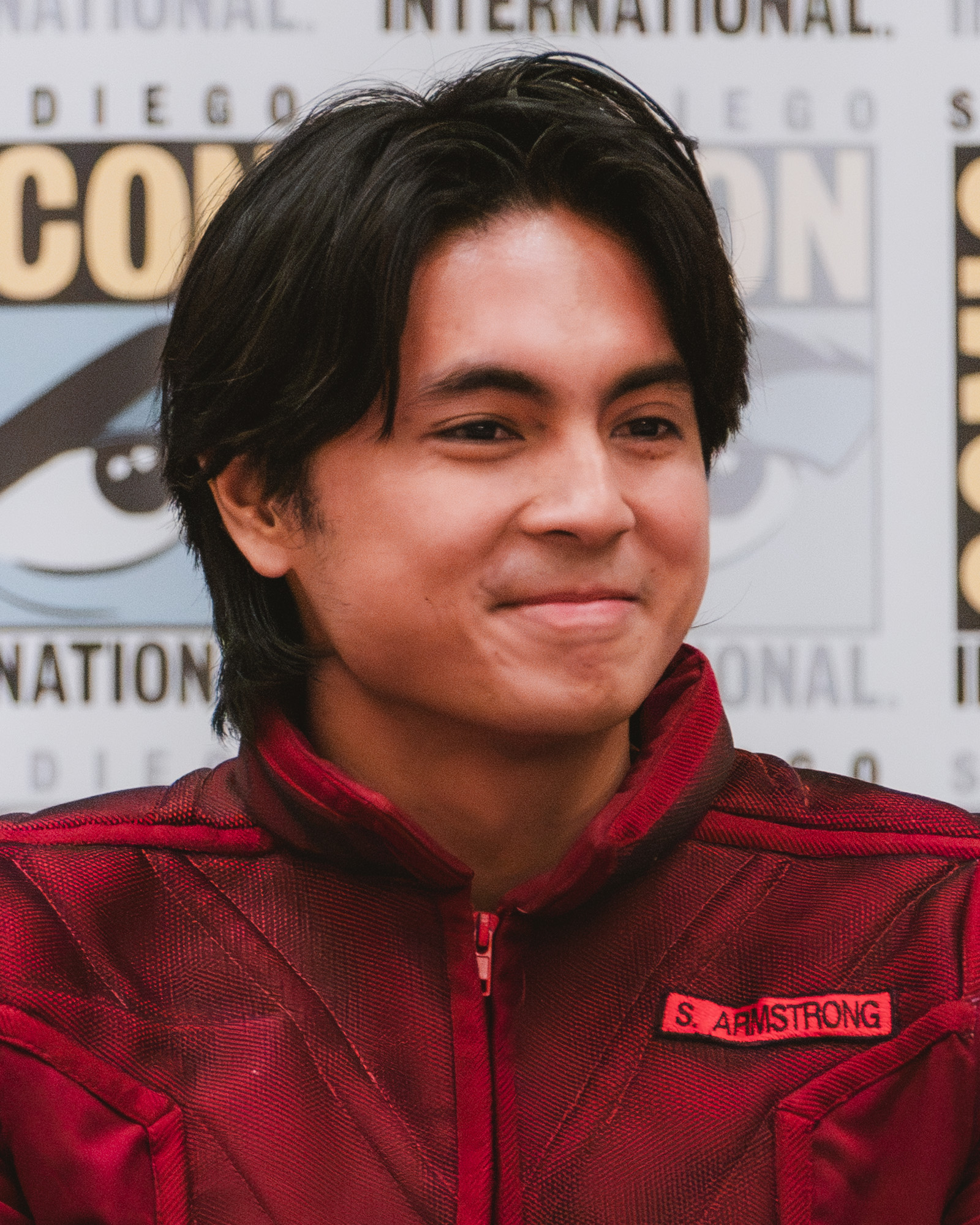
- Tanfelix in 2023
- Born: Miguel Torrejos Tanfelix; September 21, 1998 (age 28); Dasmariñas, Cavite, Philippines
- Occupation: Actor
- Years active: 2004–present
- Height: 5 ft 9 in (175 cm)

Miguel Torrejos Tanfelix (born September 21, 1998) is a Filipino actor. Tanfelix played young Pagaspas in the fantasy series Mulawin (2004); he gained prominence after playing the role of Niño Inocente, a mentally challenged boy in the series Niño (2014). He also appeared in the afternoon drama Wish I May (2016) and as Steve Armstrong in Voltes V: Legacy (2023).

== Early life ==
Tanfelix was born on September 21, 1998, in Dasmariñas, Cavite. He is the elder of two children of Mary Grace Torrejos and Gary Tanfelix, who are educators and mountaineers. Although they live in Cavite, where Tanfelix attends regular school, the family also keeps a home in Parañaque to lessen Tanfelix's travel time when filming. Tanfelix finished high school at Cavite School of Life (Dasmariñas Campus) and is now studying entrepreneurship at De La Salle University –Dasmariñas.

Tanfelix was hired by the Commission on Population and Development (CPD), an attached agency of Department of Economy, Planning, and Development (DEPDev), as a celebrity ambassador for U4U, a youth initiative giving Filipino teenagers critical information on delaying sexual activity and preventing sexually transmitted infections.

== Career ==
=== 2004–2013: StarStruck Kids ===
Tanfelix was five years old when he joined the kid version of the reality-based artista search StarStruck in 2004. It was the artista search that made Jennylyn Mercado and Mark Herras (the show's very first winners) household names. Proclaimed as the season's First Prince, Tanfelix later joined the cast of the hit fantaserye Mulawin as Young Pagaspas. The following year, Tanfelix played the role of Rainier Castillo's younger version of Jimboy/Erastus in the 2006 fantaserye Majika, and played Pepe Javier in the afternoon drama Now and Forever: Linlang.

From 2007 to 2012, Tanfelix portrayed the younger roles of some of the lead characters in several GMA series. He was Young Aldrin Griego in Pati Ba Pintig ng Puso, Young Junjun in La Vendetta, and Langit sa Piling Mo's Young Thirdy among others.

=== 2014–2016: Big Break; Niño ===
In 2014, Tanfelix received his biggest break to date when he was given the titular role of Niño. His portrayal as a mentally challenged boy received three different acting nominations from PMPC Star Awards for TV, PEP List Awards and Golden Screen TV Awards. The same year, Tanfelix joined Sunday All Stars as a co-host and a performer. Tanfelix also starred in the comedy sitcom Ismol Family with his love team Bianca Umali.

Tanfelix led his second Primetime series, Once Upon a Kiss, during the first three months of 2015. He also co-hosted the sixth season of the reality-talent search StarStruck where he first started his showbiz career. In 2016, Tanfelix once again starred in a leading role with Bianca Umali in the afternoon drama Wish I May.

=== 2015: Dubsmash: Twerk It Like Miley ===
Tanfelix with other cast of Firefly in 2023

In July 2015, Tanfelix became popular in Indonesia, Malaysia, and Timor Leste because of his viral Dubsmash video of Brandon Beal's hit song Twerk It Like Miley. Tanfelix was featured in an Indonesian newspaper, "Sumatera Ekspres" twice. He has also received several invitations to travel to Indonesia for a TV guesting and show. Tanfelix has a strong following in Indonesia, evident in his social media posts which include Bahasa (Indonesian) language comments. Tanfelix gained 300k+ followers on his social media accounts, most of them Indonesian. Because of his popularity in Indonesia, he was compared to Indonesian actor and singer Aliando Syarief. Tanfelix also recorded many video collaborations with Bacun Hakim, an Indonesian actor and host.

== Other ventures ==
=== Business ===
In 2018, Tanfelix opened his milk tea business, Original Pinoy Milk Tea in Dasmarinas, Cavite.

He also helped launched his mother food business, Mommy Grace Kitchen.

== Personal life ==
Tanfelix dated actresses Barbie Forteza from 2012 to 2014, Bianca Umali from 2014 to 2017, and Kyline Alcantara from 2017 to 2018. He had been in a relationship with Voltes V: Legacy and Firefly co-star Ysabel Ortega since late 2023.

== Filmography ==
=== Film ===
Year	Title	Role	Notes	Ref.
2005	Hari ng Sablay: Isang Tama, Sampung Mali	Young Mars	Special participation	
2005	Mulawin: The Movie	Pagaspas	Supporting role	
2006	I Will Always Love You	Jon-Jon	Supporting role	
2012	Tahanan	—N/a	Supporting role	
2019	Family History	Malix dela Cruz	Supporting role	
2023	Firefly	Billy	Supporting role	
2023	Voltes V: Legacy – The Cinematic Experience	Steve Armstrong	Main role	

=== Television ===
==== Television series ====
Year	Title	Role	Notes	Ref.
2004–2005	Mulawin	Pagaspas	Supporting role	
2006	Majika	Young Jimboy	Special participation	
2006	Now and Forever: Linlang	Pepe Javier†	Supporting role	
2007	Fantastic Man	Tikboy	Supporting role	
2007	Sine Novela: Pati Ba Pintig ng Puso	Young Aldrin Griego	Special participation	
2007	La Vendetta	Young Junjun Sabino	Special participation	
2009	Ikaw Sana	Young Michael Olivarez	Special participation	
2009–2010	Sine Novela: Tinik sa Dibdib	Boyito Domingo	Supporting role	
2010	Langit sa Piling Mo	Young Thirdy	Supporting role	
2011	Nita Negrita	Jun Jun	Supporting role	
2011	Sinner or Saint	Young Raul Marcelo	Supporting role	
2011	Futbolilits	Andy	Supporting role	
2012	Biritera	Teen Andrei Marcelino	Supporting role	
2012	Makapiling Kang Muli	Young Martín Caballero	Supporting role	
2012	Aso ni San Roque	Onyok	Supporting role	
2012–2013	Paroa: Ang Kuwento ni Mariposa	Joko Santos	Supporting role	
2013	Love & Lies	Marco Salvador	Supporting role	
2013	Mga Basang Sisiw	Chester	Guest appearance	
2014	Niño	Niño Inocente / Miguel Sagrado-Ibarra†	Leading role with David Remo	
2015	Once Upon a Kiss	Prince Pelaez Almario	Leading role with Bianca Umali	
2016	Wish I May	Tristan "Tantan" A. Gomez	Leading role with Bianca Umali	
2016	A1 Ko Sa 'Yo	Alonzo	Guest Cast with Bianca Umali, Gee Canlas, Mara Alberto and Solenn Heussaff	
2016	Encantadia	Pagaspas	Special participation	
2017	Mulawin vs. Ravena	Pagaspas	Main cast	
2017	Daimos	Richard Hartford (voice-over)		
2017–2018	Kambal, Karibal	Diego Ocampo	Main cast / anti-Hero	
2019	Sahaya	Ahmad Kamaya	Main cast / Protagonist	
2021	I Can See You: #Future	Vinchie Torres	Main cast / Protagonist	
2022	What We Could Be	Franco Luciano	Main cast / Protagonist	
2023	Voltes V: Legacy	Steve Armstrong	Main cast / Protagonist	
2025	Mga Batang Riles	Kidlat Asuncion	Main cast / Protagonist	
2026	The Master Cutter		Special participation	
2026–present	Taskforce Firewall	Galileo "Galo" Villareal	Main cast / Protagonist	

==== Television shows ====
Year	Title	Role	Ref.
2004	StarStruck Kids	Himself (finalist)	
2014–2015	Sunday All Stars	Himself (co-host)	
2015	StarStruck VI	Himself (journey host)	
2014–2016	Ismol Family	Tan-Tan	
2015–2019	Sunday PinaSaya	Himself (co-host and performer)	
2017	Full House Tonight	Himself	
2017	Road Trip	Himself (guest)	
2020–present	All-Out Sundays	Himself (co-host and performer)	
2023–present	It's Showtime	Himself (guest host and performer)	
2024	Running Man Philippines (Season 2)	Himself (contestant)	
2026	Pinoy Big Brother: Celebrity Collab Edition 2.0	Himself (houseguest)	
2026	Planet XP	Himself (host)	

==== Drama anthologies ====
Year	Title	Role	Episode(s)	Ref.
2007	Mga Kuwento ni Lola Basyang	Young Ali	Ang Mahiwagang Balabal	
2011	Star Confessions	Joshua Rafael Davis	The Yoyo Tricker	
2013	Magpakailanman	Young Carl Pempengco	The Charice Pempengco Story: Coming Out	
2014	Seasons of Love	Basti Angeles	First Dance, First Love	
2014	Magpakailanman	Joven Santos	The Cedric Macdon & Joven Santos Story: Kalakal Boys	
2014	Love Hotline	Ryan	18 and In Love	
2015	Magpakailanman	Carlos †	Ang Huling Laro ng Aking Anak	
2015	Love Hotline	Jeric Domingo	Runaway Girl	
2015	Dangwa	Josh Corpuz	Idol Love	
2015	Maynila	Brandon	Type Kita, Type Mo Ay Iba	
2015	Maynila	Tim	Love Win	
2016	Maynila	Jared	Don't Give Up On Us	
2016	Maynila	Josh	To Love and To Hope	
2016	Usapang Real Love	Diego 'Jegs' Cablao	Dream Date	
2017	Karelasyon	Butchoy	My Family	
2017	Dear Uge	Henry	Coach Me, I'm Falling	
2017	Daig Kayo ng Lola Ko	Martin	The Toy Soldier and Ballerina Doll Love Story	
2017	Daig Kayo ng Lola Ko	Arlan	The Aswang Slayer	
2019	Magpakailanman	Wenok	Sana Ngayong Pasko: The Bert Anthony Sienes Story	
2022	Magpakailanman	Diego Garcia	Footless and Fearless: The Diego Garcia Story	

==== TV specials ====
Year	Title	Role	Notes	Ref.
2011	Amaya: The Making of an Epic	Himself/Host	TV documentary	

== Awards and nominations ==
Year	Organization	Category	Nominated Work	Result
2006	FAMAS Awards	Best Child Actor	Mulawin: The Movie	Nominated
2014	PMPC Star Awards for TV	Best Drama Actor	Niño	Nominated
2015	6th Golden Screen TV Awards	Outstanding Performance by an Actor	Niño	Nominated
2015	PEP List Awards 2015	Editor's Choice: Breakthrough Performance by an Actor	Niño	Nominated
2015	PEP List Awards 2015	PEPsters' Choice Awards: Male Teen Star of the Year	Himself	Nominated
2015	Candy Reader's Choice Award	Favorite Male Rising Star	Himself	Nominated
2015	FAMAS Awards	German Moreno Youth Achievement Award	Himself	Won
2016	PEP List Awards 2016	PEPsters' Choice Awards: Pair of the Year (with Bianca Umali)	As love team	Nominated
2016	PEP List Awards 2016	PEPsters' Choice Awards: Male Star of the Year	Himself	Nominated
2017	Inding-Indie Short Film Festival	Pinakahuwarang Artista ng Mga Kabataan	Himself	Won
2018	Face of the Year Awards	Favorite Foreign Actor of the Year	Himself	Nominated
2018	1st NCST Dangal Ng Bayan Media Excellence Awards	Media Excellence Award	Himself	Won
2018	Asian Academy Creative Awards	Best Actor Award	Himself	Won
