= Love, Siargao =

2026 Philippine romantic drama television series

- Promotional poster
- Genre: Romantic drama
- Directed by: Jade Castro; Dwein Baltazar
- Starring: Nadine Lustre; Alden Richards
- Country of origin: Philippines
- Original languages: Filipino; English
- No. of episodes: 22

Production
- Production location: Siargao
- Running time: 20–26 minutes

Original release
- Network: Viu
- Release: June 26 – September 5, 2026

Love, Siargao is a Philippine romantic drama television series streaming on Viu and airing on GMA Network directed by Jade Castro and Dwein Baltazar. It stars Nadine Lustre and Alden Richards. The series premiered on Viu on June 26, 2026 to September 5, 2026. The story is about two strangers who meet on the island of Siargao.

== Premise ==
It follows Jao and Kara, two strangers bitten by different versions of this curse, whose clashing principles lead them through the highs and lows of a modern romance that forever changes their destinies.

== Cast and characters ==
=== Main cast ===
- Nadine Lustre as Kara de Leon: A woman who holds a different view regarding the island's lore.
- Alden Richards as Jao Calderon: A man whose principles are tested by his time on the island.

=== Supporting cast ===
- Ji Soo as Han Bin, owner & manager of Katig Hotel
- Kyline Alcantara as Pearl
- Gab Lagman as Quinito
- AZ Martinez as Lexi, Jao's long time friend
- Vince Maristela as Archie
- Kakki Teodoro as Carol, Owner of Carol's Inn, Ariel & Pearl's mother
- Marco Gallo as Jeremy, Kara/Caitlyn's ex-fiancé
- Adrian Lindayag as Ariel
- Christopher Diwata as Jonathan/Tantan

=== Guest cast ===
- Coleen Garcia as Allie, Jao's ex-girlfriend
- Guji Lorenzana as Sir Paul, Jao's boss

== Episodes ==
No.	Title	Original release date
1	"The Curse"	June 26, 2026
Siargao is believed to hold two curses: one that makes people fall in love with the island and never leave, and another that pulls lovers apart. While Kara celebrates the island she now calls home, Jao sets foot in Siargao determined to find the woman he came looking for.
2	"The Island"	June 27, 2026
Jao continues his search for Allie and finds himself needing help from Kara, the person who knows Siargao best. As Kara takes him around the island, their unexpected journey reveals different sides of each other and the place they both came to for different reasons.
3	"Hide and Seek"	July 3, 2026
As memories of Allie's heartbreak come to light, Kara starts seeing Jao through a different lens. Caught between someone searching and someone hiding, she begins to question where she stands.
4	"Off the Grid"	July 4, 2026
As Kara grapples with a promise that grows harder to keep, Jao unknowingly moves one step closer to the answers he's been searching for. Meanwhile, karaoke night at Katig stirs new feelings between Han Bin, Pearl, and Quinito.
5	"Sunset at the Pier"	July 10, 2026
Jao finally learns the truth about Kara’s connection to Allie and holds on to the hope of seeing the woman he loves once more. As the sun sets over Dapa Pier, hope and heartbreak quietly collide while he waits for Allie to arrive.
6	"Siargao Homecoming"	July 11, 2026
Ready to leave Siargao behind, Jao sets out to fulfill one final personal mission before returning to Manila. As Kara stands by his side, the distance between them slowly begins to fade.
7	"Riding the Waves"	July 17, 2026
As Jao and Kara's bond deepens through honest conversations and shared moments, they must face the reality that Jao's journey in Siargao is coming to an end. Meanwhile, Quinito's interest in Pearl quietly stirs emotions Han Bin struggles to deny.
8	"Ocean of Feels"	July 18, 2026
Jao and Kara try to embrace life beyond their time together, but distance only makes their connection harder to forget. Meanwhile, Quinito takes a leap of faith with Pearl, leaving Han Bin to quietly hide what he truly feels.
9	"New Waves"	July 24, 2026
Kara reveals another side of herself as she introduces Jao to Ruth, the mangrove she planted with hope for the future. Yet just as they grow closer, someone unexpected arrives on the island.
10	"Chemistry"	July 25, 2026
A visit from Jao's longtime friend Lexi brings fresh energy to the group, along with playful teasing about his growing closeness with Kara. But the arrival of Archie adds a competitive edge that Jao never saw coming.
11	"The Visitors"	July 31, 2026
As Jao, Kara, Lexi, and Archie spend the day doing community work, Jao and Kara find themselves growing closer despite Archie's determination to win Kara's attention. But a quiet moment in the mangroves leaves Jao and Kara's relationship at a turning point.
12	"Celebration"	August 1, 2026
As Katig Hotel celebrates the memories, friendships, and community it has built over the years, Jao and Kara grow more comfortable with the happiness they've found together. Han Bin also shares a heartfelt moment with Pearl that reminds him how fortunate he is to have found a family in Siargao. But as the celebration comes to a close, someone from Kara's past unexpectedly arrives.
13	"Jao Meets Caitlyn"	August 7, 2026
Kara finally trusts Jao with the story of the woman she once was, allowing him to see the wounds behind her strength. Meanwhile, Han Bin struggles to reveal a truth he's kept hidden for far too long.
14	"Back to Reality"	August 8, 2026
With the chance to lead the mangrove rehabilitation project, Kara begins to see a brighter future ahead, while Pearl makes meaningful progress toward her scholarship application with Han Bin's encouragement. But is Kara finally ready to face what she's left behind?
15	"Stronger Together"	August 14, 2026
A celebration is disrupted when a rude foreign tourist targets Pearl, prompting the community to rally together in her defense. The incident brings Kara's old wounds to the surface, but with Jao beside her, she finally finds the strength to open her heart to a new beginning. The night's events also bring Han Bin and Pearl closer, marking a new chapter in their growing connection.
16	"An Unfortunate Situation"	August 15, 2026
Jao and Kara spend another peaceful day at the Del Carmen mangroves, creating memories that bring new meaning to their relationship. The arrival of a Korean guest at Katig leaves Han Bin visibly unsettled, raising questions about the past he's trying to escape. As the truth becomes impossible to avoid, Han Bin finally confesses his feelings to Pearl.
17	"The Clash"	August 21, 2026
Pearl discovers Han Bin's true identity, leaving her to process the revelation about the man she has come to know and care for. As Kara leads the community in their efforts to protect and restore the mangroves, their campaign gains support from the local residents. But just as they begin to see progress, an unexpected challenge puts their efforts at risk.
18	"The Crash"	August 22, 2026
Kara and Jao find themselves on different sides of the fight over the future of the community's mangrove rehabilitation project. As they try to work through their differences, their personal relationship becomes harder to separate from the issues they are fighting for.
19	"Wipeout"	August 28, 2026
As the conflict over the mangroves continues, Jao works to find a solution that protects what matters to him. As Kara's past resurfaces and puts her credibility into question, she finds herself once again facing the consequences of choices she made before Siargao. Then, an unexpected opportunity presents Kara with a new possibility for her future.
20	"Karajaw Gyud"	August 29, 2026
With the mangrove issue settled, Kara and Jao find themselves facing a more personal question: are they truly meant to be together? As Pearl looks ahead to a new chapter in her life, she can't help but miss Han Bin, the person who encouraged her to believe in her dreams.
21	"Too Good to Be True"	September 4, 2026
Han Bin comes back to Siargao just before Pearl leaves for her studies, giving them a moment to finally say what they feel. As Jao talks about the future he hopes to build in Siargao, Kara is faced with an opportunity that could allow her to make an even greater impact. With both of them thinking about the lives they want, Kara and Jao are left to figure out if they can build that future together.
22	"KaraJao"	September 5, 2026
What brings you to Siargao may be a trip, an adventure, a chance to meet someone new, to fall in love, to heal, or simply to find your way again. But somewhere between the sunsets, unexpected encounters, quiet moments, and people who come into your life when you least expect them, you begin to find something worth holding on to. Perhaps the Siargao curse was never a curse at all, but the magic of an island that reminds you that some people are meant to cross your path, some places are meant to feel like home, and some moments stay with you long after they are gone. And after everything that brought Kara and Jao together, could the magic of Siargao bring them back to each other?

== Production ==
=== Development ===
Viu Philippines announced the project on January 14, 2026. The series is a "Viu Original" production. Viva Entertainment serves as the line producer for the show.

The show aims to feature the location of Siargao, including its beaches, food, and local culture.

=== Casting ===
Love, Siargao marks the first acting project featuring both Nadine Lustre and Alden Richards. Lustre was previously part of the "JaDine" love team, while Richards was in the "AlDub" love team. Both actors pursued solo careers prior to this project.

=== Filming ===
Principal photography commenced in Siargao from April 2026 to May 2026.

== Release ==
The series is scheduled to be released on the streaming platform Viu on June 26, 2026. The series originally consists of 26 episodes but was changed to 22 episodes due to the increase of gas prices. The series will air on GMA Network on September 28, 2026 on the network's Prime line-up.

== Awards and nominations ==
Accolades received by Hello, Love, Goodbye
Awards	Year	Category	Recipient(s)	Result	Ref.
Asian Academy Creative Awards	2026	Best Original Production by a Streamer	Love, Siaragao	Won	
Asian Academy Creative Awards	2026	Best Actress	Nadine Lustre	Won	
