= Niño (TV series) =

2014 Philippine television drama series

- Title card
- Genre: Drama
- Created by: Jules Katanyag
- Written by: Jules Katanyag; Anna Aleta Nadela; Ma. Zita Garganera
- Directed by: Maryo J. de los Reyes
- Creative director: Jun Lana
- Starring: Miguel Tanfelix; David Remo
- Ending theme: "Liyab" by Aicelle Santos
- Country of origin: Philippines
- Original language: Tagalog
- No. of episodes: 80 (list of episodes)

Production
- Executive producer: Leilani Feliciano-Sandoval
- Production locations: Manila, Philippines
- Cinematography: Jun Gonzales
- Editors: Joseph Nieva; Lara Theresa Linsangan; Lawrence John Villena
- Camera setup: Multiple-camera setup
- Running time: 27–38 minutes
- Production company: GMA Entertainment TV

Original release
- Network: GMA Network
- Release: May 26 – September 12, 2014

Niño is a 2014 Philippine television drama series broadcast by GMA Network. Directed by Maryo J. de los Reyes, it stars Miguel Tanfelix in the title role and David Remo. It premiered on May 26, 2014, on the network's Telebabad line up. The series concluded on September 12, 2014, with a total of 80 episodes.

The series is streaming online on YouTube.

== Premise ==
Niño, who will be adopted and raised by Leny and David after being separated from his parents due to an accident, will become a source of inspiration and hope to the people in Barrio Pag-asa. While Tukayo will help and guide Niño in overcoming different circumstances.

== Cast and characters ==
Cast

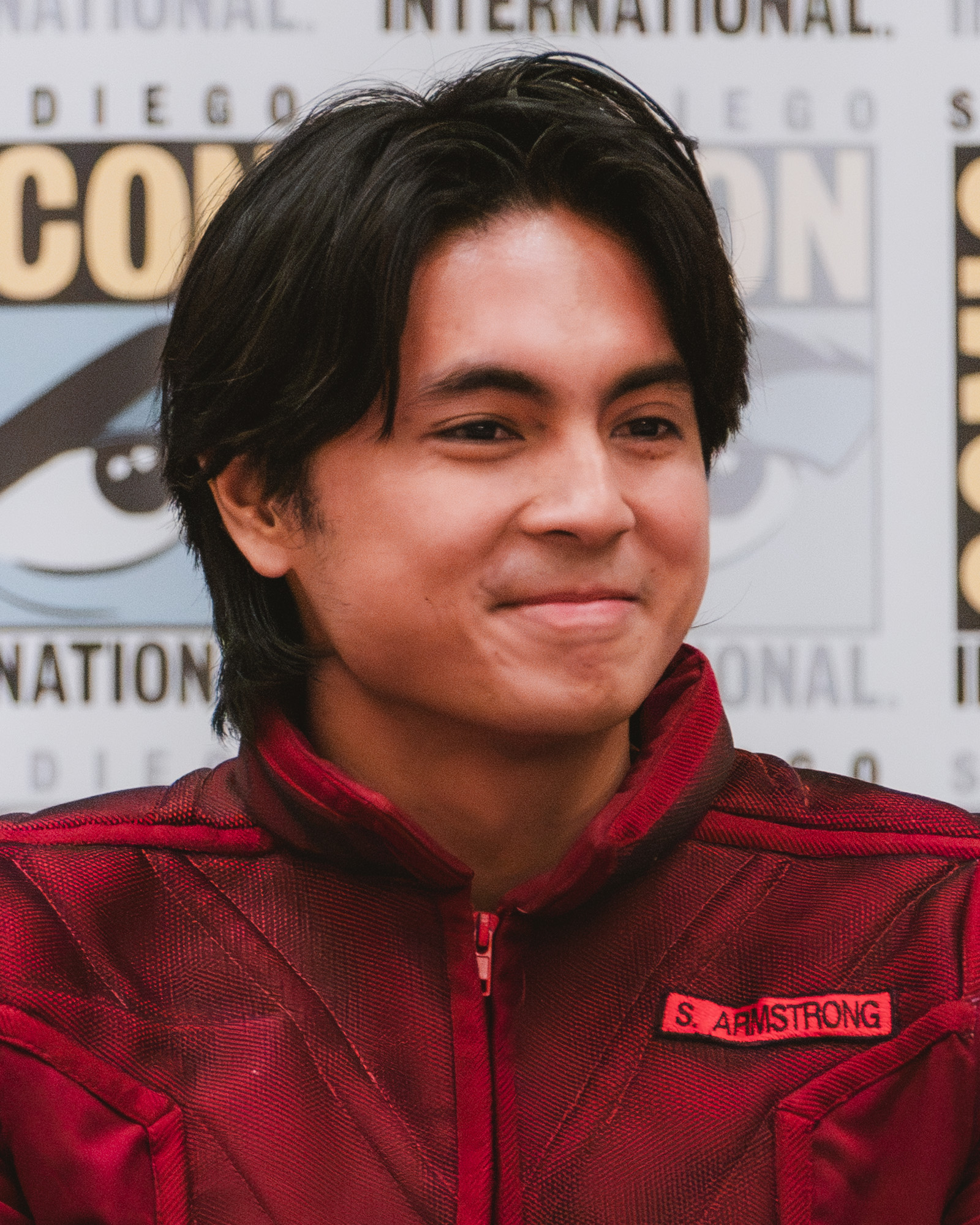
Miguel Tanfelix

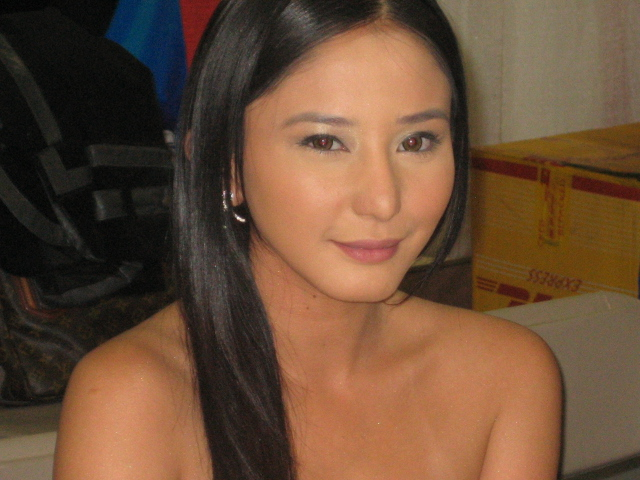
Katrina Halili

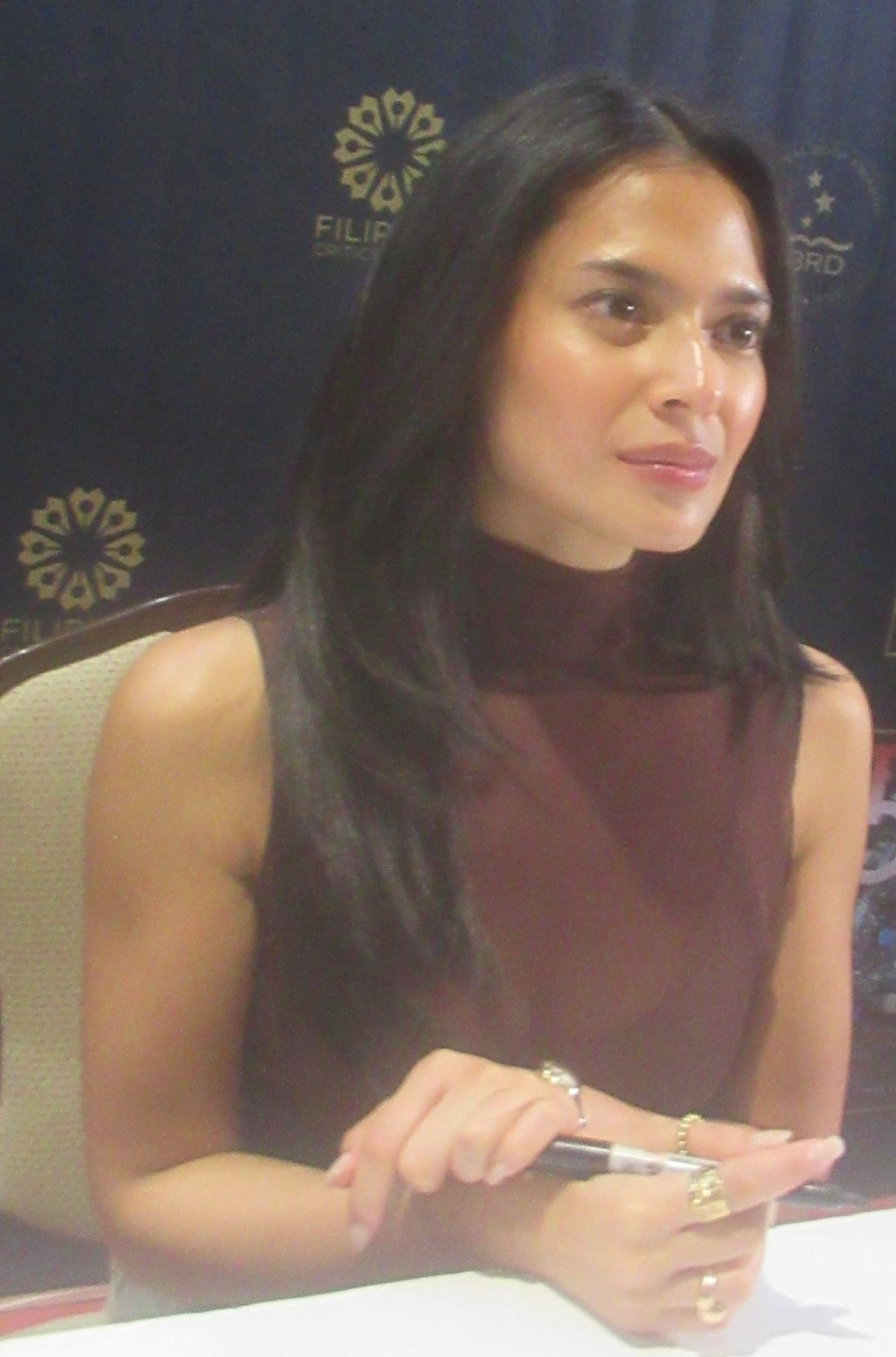
Bianca Umali

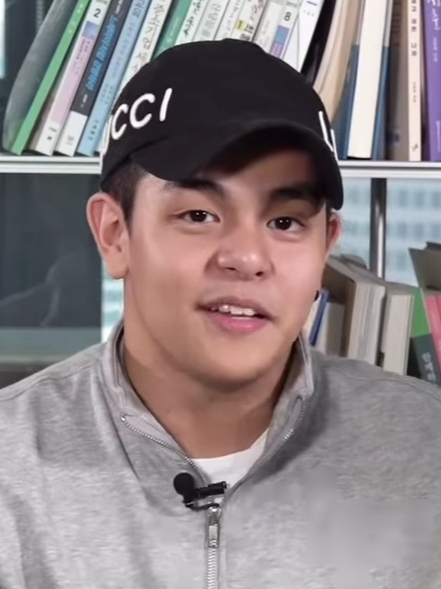
Julian Trono

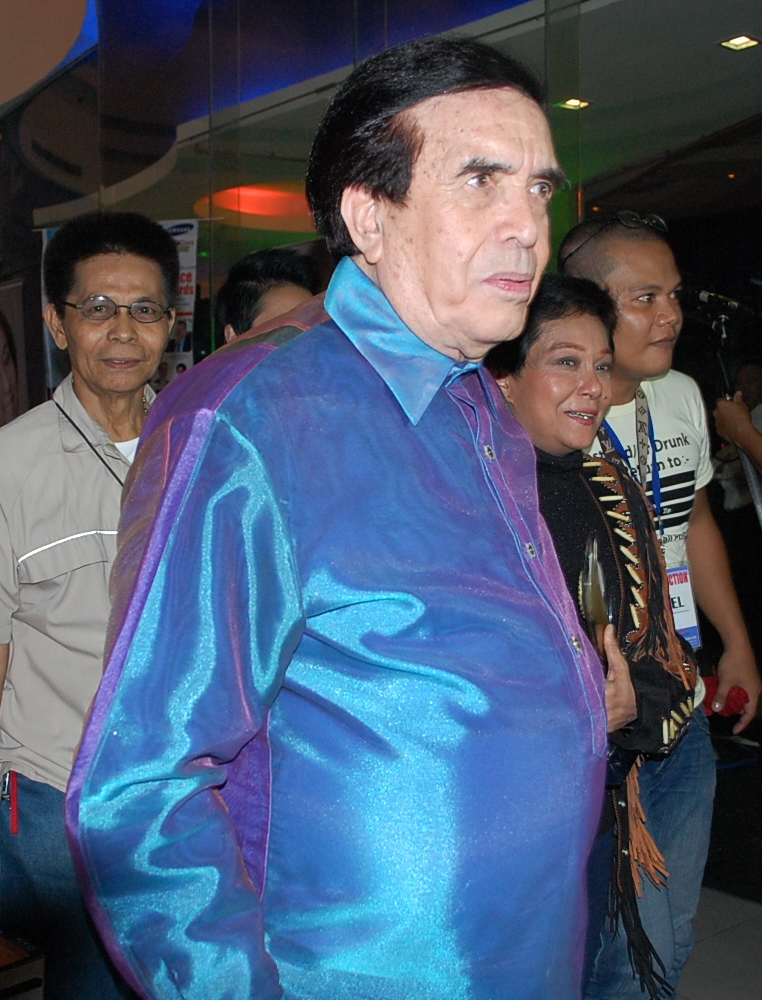
German Moreno

Lead cast

- Miguel Tanfelix as Niño Innocente / Miguel Sagrado Ibarra
- David Remo as Tukayo Maki / Sto. Niño

Supporting cast

- Gloria Romero as Violeta
- Dante Rivero as Pedro Sagrado
- Angelu de Leon as Leny Innocente
- Jay Manalo as Lucio
- Katrina Halili as Hannah Sagrado-Ibarra
- Neil Ryan Sese as David Innocente
- Luz Valdez as Josefa "Epang" Innocente
- Ces Quesada as Danita Delos Santos
- Renz Valerio as Raphael Sagrado Ibarra
- Bianca Umali as Angelica "Gracie"
- Sandy Talag as Tiny Delos Santos
- Julian Trono as Cocoy
- Vincent Magbanua as Matmat
- German Moreno as Pete

Recurring cast

- Jerald Napoles as Obet
- Angeli Bayani as Helen
- Rafa Siguion-Reyna as Ric
- Annika Camaya as Charito
- Stephanie Sol as Magda

Guest cast

- Tom Rodriguez as Gabriel Ibarra
- Lito Legaspi as Manuel Reyes
- Bettina Carlos as Heidi
- Gian Magdangal as Juanito
- Isabelle Daza as Claire
- Jestoni Alarcon as Henry
- Mickey Ferriols as Cathy
- Barbara Miguel as Calay
- Sherilyn Reyes as Cynthia
- Lara Melissa De Leon as Perla
- Will Ashley De Leon as younger Niño
- Elijah Alejo as younger Gracie
- Flora Gasser as Ason
- Nicole Dulalia as Patty
- Andrea Del Rosario as Olivia

== Ratings ==
According to AGB Nielsen Philippines' Mega Manila household television ratings, the pilot episode of Nino earned a 21.2% rating. The final episode scored a 29.6% rating. The series had its highest rating on September 8, 2014, with a 30.4% rating.

== Accolades ==
Accolades received by Niño
Year	Award	Category	Recipient	Result	Ref.
2014	28th PMPC Star Awards for Television	Best Primetime Drama Series	Niño	Nominated	
2014	28th PMPC Star Awards for Television	Best Drama Actor	Miguel Tanfelix	Nominated	
2014	28th PMPC Star Awards for Television	Best New Male TV Personality	Rafa Siguion-Reyna	Nominated	
