= Christopher Diwata =

Filipino actor, influencer and comedian

- Born: Orion, Bataan
- Education: Limay Polytechnic College
- Occupations: Commercial Model; Influencer; Comedian
- Years active: 2013–present
- Agent: Viva Artists Agency
- Spouse: Ronalyn Diwata
- Children: 2

Christopher Diwata is a Filipino comedian, influencer and commercial model who gained popularity and recognition as a contestant in a second season of the It's Showtime segment Kalokalike (2013) when he impersonated Taylor Lautner.

== Life and background ==
Christopher Diwata was born and raised in Orion, Bataan.

After his appearance on It's Showtime and gained initial fame, he discontinued his studies for thinking that he was already earning, but the gigs did not last, and his initial fame faded. By pursuing his celebrity dreams, he tried to live in Manila, but nothing happened.

Before he became viral in TikTok, Diwata was a fish dealer in Bataan, but he stopped because his business was struggling and leading him into debt. At that time, his wife Ronalyn Diwata became the provider of the family. Ronalyn and Christopher have been married for nine years. It was Ronalyn who informed him that he had gone viral again.

After his fame, he requested commercial brands to appear in a social media ad, partnership request and more. Diwata was able to provide for his family and pay their debts.

== Career ==
Diwata's career rose when his video on It's Showtime trended on TikTok, his impersonation with Taylor Lautner and his line "What hafen Vella?" gained popularity and became a meme. Because of that, he gained a lot of brand endorsement and was able to buy his own car and purchased a food stall business franchise.

Now, Diwata has a huge following on TikTok, and also created a YouTube vlog named "Lakbay Diwata channel", where he and his friends visit cemeteries and haunted houses to hunt for ghosts and supernatural beings, and they are doing Mukbang.

=== Acting ===
In 2025, Diwata entered the world of acting when he played the character Chakob in GMA Network's action series Mga Batang Riles. He also starred in the upcoming romantic drama series Love, Siargao which is scheduled to be release on the streaming platform Viu in the second quarter of 2026. In August 15, 2026, Diwata signed a contract in Viva Artists Agency.

== Filmography ==
=== Television ===
Year	Title	Role	Ref!
2013	It's Showtime	Himself / Contestant, Kalokalike Face 2: Level Up segment	
2025	It's Showtime	Himself / Contestant / Guest, KidSONA segment	
2025	Mga Batang Riles	Chakob	
2025	Family Feud	Himself / Player	
2025	Rated Korina	Himself	
2025	Kapatid Mo, Idol Raffy Tulfo	Himself / Guest in Bardagulan Serye segment	
2025	Cayetano in Action with Boy Abunda	Himself / Guest	
2026	Love, Siargao	Jonathan / Tantan	
