= List of Niño episodes =

Niño is a 2014 Philippine television drama series broadcast by GMA Network. It premiered on the network's Telebabad line up from May 26, 2014 to September 12, 2014, replacing Carmela: Ang Pinakamagandang Babae sa Mundong Ibabaw in Kambal Sirena's timeslot.

Mega Manila ratings are provided by AGB Nielsen Philippines.

== Series overview ==
Month	Episodes	Monthly Averages
Month	Episodes	Mega Manila
May 2014	5	20.4%
June 2014	21	22.1%
July 2014	23	23.5%
August 2014	21	25.7%
September 2014	10	27.5%
Total	80	23.8%

== Episodes ==
=== May 2014 ===
Episode		Original air date	Social Media Hashtag	AGB Nielsen Mega Manila Households in Television Homes			Ref.
Episode		Original air date	Social Media Hashtag	Rating	Timeslot Rank	Primetime Rank	Ref.
1	Unang Araw ng Pag-asa	May 26, 2014	#NiñoUnangArawNgPagAsa	21.2%	#2	#5	
2	Gabriel Saves Niño	May 27, 2014	#GabrielSavesNiño	18.3%	#2	#8	
3	Bagong Pamilya ni Niño	May 28, 2014	#BagongPamilyaNiNiño	21.0%	#2	#7	
4	Pagkakaisa para kay Niño	May 29, 2014	#PagkakaisaParaKayNiño	21.9%	#2	#5	
5	Niño Meets Hannah	May 30, 2014	#NiñoMeetsHannah	19.6%	#2	#7	

=== June 2014 ===
Episode		Original air date	Social Media Hashtag	AGB Nielsen Mega Manila Households in Television Homes			Ref.
Episode		Original air date	Social Media Hashtag	Rating	Timeslot Rank	Primetime Rank	Ref.
6	Lucio Meets Niño	June 2, 2014	#LucioMeetsNiño	22.3%	#1	#4	
7	Inosente Family to the Rescue	June 3, 2014	#NiñoInosenteFamilyToTheRescue	20.5%	#1	#5	
8	Good luck sa exam, Niño!	June 4, 2014	#GoodLuckSaExamNiño	19.5%	#2	#7	
9	Bagong Kaibigan	June 5, 2014	#NiñoBagongKaibigan	20.5%	#2	#6	
10	Ang Aksidente	June 6, 2014	#NiñoAngAksidente	19.5%	#1	#5	
11	Get well soon, Niño!	June 9, 2014	#GetWellSoonNiño	18.9%	#2	#7	
12	Ang Mga Pagbabago	June 10, 2014	#NiñoAngMgaPagbabago	21.8%	#2	#6	
13	Niño Loves Gracie	June 11, 2014	#NiñoLovesGracie	22.2%	#1	#5	
14	Pagbabalik Pag-asa	June 12, 2014	#NiñoPagbabalikPagasa	21.8%	#1	#5	
15	Nasaan si Niño?	June 13, 2014	#NasaanSiNiño	21.5%	#2	#6	
16	Iligtas si Niño	June 16, 2014	#IligtasSiNiño	21.1%	#2	#5	
17	Niño Meets Tukayo	June 17, 2014	#NiñoMeetsTukayo	22.0%	#2	#5	
18	Niño Inosente	June 18, 2014	#NiñoInosente	22.7%	#1	#3	
19	Niño Loves Lola V	June 19, 2014	#NiñoLovesLolaV	23.6%	#1	#4	
20	Pagdating ng El Niño	June 20, 2014	#PagdatingNgElNiño	23.4%	#1	#4	
21	Laging May Pag-asa	June 23, 2014	#LagingMayPagasa	23.6%	#1	#2	
22	Stay Happy, Hannah	June 24, 2014	#StayHappyHannah	23.9%	#1	#1	
23	Si Niño ang Pag-asa	June 25, 2014	#SiNiñoAngPagasa	22.5%	#1	#2	
24	Good Vibes	June 26, 2014	#NiñoGoodVibes	24.6%	#1	#3	
25	The Good Student	June 27, 2014	#NiñoTheGoodStudent	25.0%	#1	#2	
26	Milagro ni Tukayo	June 30, 2014	#MilagroNiTukayo	23.3%	#1	#1	

=== July 2014 ===
Episode		Original air date	Social Media Hashtag	AGB Nielsen Mega Manila Households in Television Homes			Ref.
Episode		Original air date	Social Media Hashtag	Rating	Timeslot Rank	Primetime Rank	Ref.
27	Hero si Tatay David	July 1, 2014	#HeroSiTatayDavid	23.0%	#1	#1	
28	Ang Payo ni Tukayo	July 2, 2014	#AngPayoNiTukayo	24.6%	#1	#1	
29	The Niño Dance	July 3, 2014	#TheNiñoDance	24.6%	#1	#1	
30	The Kind Inosente Family	July 4, 2014	#TheKindInosenteFamily	23.0%	#1	#1	
31	Ang Hero ng Pag-asa	July 7, 2014	#AngHeroNgPagasa	24.5%	#1	#1	
32	Lihim ng Nakaraan	July 8, 2014	#LihimNgNakaraan	23.8%	#1	#1	
33	Sweet Surprise	July 9, 2014	#NiñoSweetSurprise	22.8%	#1	#2	
34	Follow Your Heart	July 10, 2014	#FollowYourHeart	25.0%	#1	#1	
35	Niño and Gracie Day	July 11, 2014	#NiñoAndGracieDay	23.0%	#1	#1	
36	You Make Me Happy	July 14, 2014	#YouMakeMeHappy	25.3%	#1	#1	
37	Family Comes First	July 15, 2014	#NiñoFamilyComesFirst	25.7%	#1	#2	
38	Gracie, puwede ba manligaw?	July 16, 2014	#GraciePuwedeBaManligaw	12.5%	#1	#2	
39	Si Niño ang hero ko	July 17, 2014	#SiNiñoAngHeroKo	16.0%	#1	#2	
40	Gracie Loves Niño	July 18, 2014	#GracieLovesNiño	17.9%	#1	#4	
41	Gracie vs. Tiny	July 21, 2014	#GracieVSTiny	22.2%	#1	#2	
42	Mr. and Ms. Teen Pag-asa	July 22, 2014	#MrAndMsTeenPagasa	26.1%	#1	#1	
43	Night to Remember	July 23, 2014	#NiñoNightToRemember	27.0%	#1	#1	
44	Keep Calm and Be Happy	July 24, 2014	#KeepCalmAndBeHappy	26.6%	#1	#1	
45	The Unexpected Hero	July 25, 2014	#TheUnexpectedHero	24.2%	#1	#3	
46	Happy to Help	July 28, 2014	#NiñoHappyToHelp	24.3%	#1	#2	
47	Pagbabago sa Buhay	July 29, 2014	#PagbabagoSaBuhay	25.5%	#1	#2	
48	Paalala ni Tukayo	July 30, 2014	#PaalalaNiTukayo	25.4%	#1	#1	
49	Pray for Rafael	July 31, 2014	#PrayForRafael	27.6%	#1	#1	

=== August 2014 ===
Episode		Original air date	Social Media Hashtag	AGB Nielsen Mega Manila Households in Television Homes			Ref.
Episode		Original air date	Social Media Hashtag	Rating	Timeslot Rank	Primetime Rank	Ref.
50	Hinagpis ni Naynay	August 1, 2014	#HinagpisNiNaynay	25.5%	#1	#2	
51	The Truth Will Set You Free	August 4, 2014	#TheTruthWillSetYouFree	27.8%	#1	#2	
52	Smile, Naynay Leny!	August 5, 2014	#SmileNaynayLeny	26.4%	#1	#1	
53	Niño Wants Peace	August 6, 2014	#NiñoWantsPeace	23.7%	#1	#1	
54	Lean on Me	August 7, 2014	#LeanOnMe	26.2%	#1	#1	
55	Like Naynay, Like Son	August 8, 2014	#LikeNaynayLikeSon	25.3%	#1	#1	
56	Pagbabalik ng Nakaraan	August 11, 2014	#PagbabalikNgNakaraan	24.8%	#1	#1	
57	Basta Everybody Happy	August 12, 2014	#BastaEverybodyHappy	24.3%	#1	#1	
58	The Good News	August 13, 2014	#TheGoodNews	24.7%	#1	#1	
59	Mystery Call	August 14, 2014	#NiñoMysteryCall	24.8%	#1	#1	
60	Natitirang Alaala	August 15, 2014	#NatitirangAlaala	25.1%	#1	#1	
61	The Secret	August 18, 2014	#NiñoTheSecret	23.4%	#1	#2	
62	Ang Dakilang Naynay	August 19, 2014	#AngDakilangNaynay	24.7%	#1	#1	
63	The Truth	August 20, 2014	#NiñoTheTruth	25.3%	#1	#1	
64	Mensahe kay Lola V	August 21, 2014	#MensaheKayLolaV	27.3%	#1	#1	
65	Happy Day	August 22, 2014	#NiñoHappyDay	26.2%	#1	#1	
66	It's a Date	August 25, 2014	#ItsADate	24.0%	#1	#2	
67	The Promise	August 26, 2014	#NiñoThePromise	26.6%	#1	#2	
68	Nasaan si Niño?	August 27, 2014	#NasaanSiNino	25.6%	#1	#2	
69	Tunay na Naynay	August 28, 2014	#TunayNaNaynay	29.5%	#1	#1	
70	Tunay na may Karapatan	August 29, 2014	#TunayNaMayKarapatan	28.3%	#1	#1	

=== September 2014 ===
Episode		Original air date	Social Media Hashtag	AGB Nielsen Mega Manila Households in Television Homes			Ref.
Episode		Original air date	Social Media Hashtag	Rating	Timeslot Rank	Primetime Rank	Ref.
71	Lucio vs. David	September 1, 2014	#LucioVSDavid	27.2%	#1	#1	
72	Ang Nawawalang Sagrado	September 2, 2014	#AngNawawalangSagrado	26.6%	#1	#1	
73	One More Day	September 3, 2014	#OneMoreDay	23.5%	#1	#3	
74	Pangamba ni Hannah	September 4, 2014	#PangambaNiHannah	26.3%	#1	#2	
75	Surprise for Naynay	September 5, 2014	#SurpriseForNaynay	27.5%	#1	#1	
76	Mga Sikreto ni Lucio	September 8, 2014	#MgaSikretoNiLucio	30.4%	#1	#1	
77	A Mother's Love	September 9, 2014	#AMothersLove	28.3%	#1	#1	
78	I'm here for you	September 10, 2014	#ImHereForYou	27.9%	#1	#1	
79	Parating na Delubyo	September 11, 2014	#ParatingNaDelubyo	28.1%	#1	#1	
80	Niño Saves Pag-asa	September 12, 2014	#NinoSavesPagasa	29.6%	#1	#1	
