= List of Wish I May episodes =

Wish I May is a 2016 Philippine television drama romance series broadcast by GMA Network. It premiered on the network's Afternoon Prime line up and worldwide on GMA Pinoy TV from January 18, 2016 to May 20, 2016, replacing The Half Sisters.

Mega Manila ratings are provided by AGB Nielsen Philippines.

== Series overview ==
Month	Episodes	Monthly Averages
Month	Episodes	Mega Manila
January 2016	10	16.6%
February 2016	21	15.5%
March 2016	21	16.0%
April 2016	21	16.3%
May 2016	15	16.0%
Total	88	16.1%

== Episodes ==
=== January 2016 ===
Episode		Original air date	Social Media Hashtag	AGB Nielsen Mega Manila Households in Television Homes			Ref.
Episode		Original air date	Social Media Hashtag	Rating	Timeslot Rank	Daytime Rank	Ref.
1	Pilot	January 18, 2016	#WishIMay	17.1%	#1	#2	
2	Welcome, Baby Carina!	January 19, 2016	#WIMWelcomeBabyCarina	15.9%	#1	#2	
3	Happy Birthday, Cacai!	January 20, 2016	#WIMHappyBirthdayCacai	16.9%	#1	#2	
4	Paglilihim ni Andrew	January 21, 2016	#WIMPaglilihimNiAndrew	17.3%	#1	#2	
5	Trahedya	January 22, 2016	#WIMTrahedya	16.7%	#1	#2	
6	Blaming Carina	January 25, 2016	#WIMBlamingCarina	15.6%	#1	#2	
7	Welcome, BiGuel!	January 26, 2016	#WIMWelcomeBiGuel	16.3%	#1	#2	
8	Miguel Saves Bianca	January 27, 2016	#WIMMiguelSavesBianca	16.4%	#1	#2	
9	Thank You, Tantan!	January 28, 2016	#WIMThankYouTantan	16.6%	#1	#2	
10	BiGuel Meet Again	January 29, 2016	#WIMBiGuelMeetAgain	17.4%	#1	#2	

=== February 2016 ===
Episode		Original air date	Social Media Hashtag	AGB Nielsen Mega Manila Households in Television Homes			Ref.
Episode		Original air date	Social Media Hashtag	Rating	Timeslot Rank	Daytime Rank	Ref.
11	Tantan Looks For Cacai	February 1, 2016	#WIMTantanLooksForCacai	17.5%	#1	#2	
12	Tantan Fights For Cacai	February 2, 2016	#WIMTantanFightsForCacai	15.2%	#1	#2	
13	Olivia Returns	February 3, 2016	#WIMOliviaReturns	14.9%	#1	#2	
14	Still Not Friends	February 4, 2016	#WIMStillNotFriends	15.3%	#1	#2	
15	Tantan Pursues Cacai	February 5, 2016	#WIMTantanPursuesCacai	17.6%	#1	#2	
16	Renewed Friendship	February 8, 2016	#WIMRenewedFriendship	16.4%	#1	#2	
17	Cacai's Secret	February 9, 2016	#WIMCacaisSecret	15.5%	#1	#2	
18	Jealous Tantan	February 10, 2016	#WIMJealousTantan	15.7%	#1	#2	
19	Cacai's Date	February 11, 2016	#WIMCacaisDate	14.5%	#1	#2	
20	Ngitngit ni Audrey	February 12, 2016	#WIMNgitngitNiAudrey	15.1%	#1	#2	
21	Cacai's Notebook	February 15, 2016	#WIMCacaisNotebook	15.0%	#1	#2	
22	Tantan Likes Cacai	February 16, 2016	#WIMTantanLikesCacai	16.4%	#1	#3	
23	Tantan Protects Cacai	February 17, 2016	#WIMTantanProtectsCacai	15.6%	#1	#3	
24	Cacai Guards Tristan	February 18, 2016	#WIMCacaiGuardsTristan	14.9%	#1	#3	
25	Olivia Fights Back	February 19, 2016	#WIMOliviaFightsBack	15.0%	#1	#3	
26	Accidental Date	February 22, 2016	#WIMAccidentalDate	15.6%	#1	#2	
27	Cacai's Secret Revealed	February 23, 2016	#WIMCacaisSecretRevealed	13.7%	#1	#3	
28	Accidental Kiss	February 24, 2016	#WIMAccidentalKiss	16.4%	#1	#2	
29	Cacai Awkward	February 25, 2016	#WIMCacaiAwkward	15.5%	#1	#3	
30	Tristan Confronts Cacai	February 26, 2016	#WIMTristanConfrontsCacai	14.9%	#1	#2	
31	Yaya Doris is Back	February 29, 2016	#WIMYayaDorisIsBack	14.2%	#1	#3	

=== March 2016 ===
Episode		Original air date	Social Media Hashtag	AGB Nielsen Mega Manila Households in Television Homes			Ref.
Episode		Original air date	Social Media Hashtag	Rating	Timeslot Rank	Daytime Rank	Ref.
32	Secret ni Yaya Doris	March 1, 2016	#WIMSecretNiYayaDoris	13.9%	#1	#3	
33	Love You Cacai	March 2, 2016	#WIMLoveYouCacai	13.9%	#1	#3	
34	Yaya Doris at Olivia	March 3, 2016	#WIMYayaDorisAtOlivia	15.3%	#1	#3	
35	Loretta Befriends Audrey	March 4, 2016	#WIMLorettaBefriendsAudrey	15.7%	#1	#3	
36	Banta ni Loretta	March 7, 2016	#WIMBantaNiLoretta	14.5%	#1	#3	
37	Doris in Trouble	March 8, 2016	#WIMDorisInTrouble	15.4%	#1	#3	
38	Sakripisyo ni Cacai	March 9, 2016	#WIMSakripisyoNiCacai	15.7%	#1	#2	
39	Yakap ni Tristan	March 10, 2016	#WIMYakapNiTristan	14.7%	#1	#4	
40	Cacai Under Attack	March 11, 2016	#WIMCacaiUnderAttack	17.4%	#1	#2	
41	Tristan in Danger	March 14, 2016	#WIMTristanInDanger	16.9%	#1	#2	
42	Cacai Visits Tantan	March 15, 2016	#WIMCacaiVisitsTantan	16.1%	#1	#4	
43	Paglalayas ni Cacai	March 16, 2016	#WIMPaglalayasNiCacai	17.5%	#1	#2	
44	Cacai on Her Own	March 17, 2016	#WIMCacaiOnHerOwn	16.7%	#1	#3	
45	Never Give Up, Tristan!	March 18, 2016	#WIMNeverGiveUpTristan	16.7%	#1	#2	
46	Missing Necklace	March 21, 2016	#WIMMissingNecklace	16.4%	#1	#2	
47	Cacai Meets Clark	March 22, 2016	#WIMCacaiMeetsClark	17.5%	#1	#3	
48	The Playful Fate	March 23, 2016	#WishIMay	17.9%	#1	#2	
49	Clark's Discovery	March 28, 2016	#WIMClarksDiscovery	16.0%	#1	#2	
50	Olivia's Discovery	March 29, 2016	#WIMOliviasDiscovery	16.0%	#1	#3	
51	Olivia Helps Cacai	March 30, 2016	#WIMOliviaHelpsCacai	16.3%	#1	#2	
52	Olivia Begs Loretta	March 31, 2016	#WIMOliviaBegsLoretta	15.7%	#1	#3	

=== April 2016 ===
Episode		Original air date	Social Media Hashtag	AGB Nielsen Mega Manila Households in Television Homes			Ref.
Episode		Original air date	Social Media Hashtag	Rating	Timeslot Rank	Daytime Rank	Ref.
53	Cacai Lets Tristan Go	April 1, 2016	#WIMCacaiLetsTristanGo	15.7%	#1	#3	
54	Last Goodbye	April 4, 2016	#WIMLastGoodbye	17.0%	#1	#3	
55	Finally Official	April 5, 2016	#WIMFinallyOfficial	16.0%	#1	#3	
56	Jealous Cacai	April 6, 2016	#WIMJealousCacai	17.3%	#1	#2	
57	Doris Resurfaces	April 7, 2016	#WIMDorisResurfaces	17.5%	#1	#2	
58	Loretta's Guilt	April 8, 2016	#WIMLorettasGuilt	15.7%	#1	#3	
59	Clark's Refuge	April 11, 2016	#WishIMay	16.8%	#1	#2	
60	Olivia Still Loves Clark	April 12, 2016	#WIMOliviaStillLovesClark	17.5%	#1	#2	
61	Betrayal	April 13, 2016	#WIMBetrayal	15.9%	#1	#2	
62	Hurting Cacai	April 14, 2016	#WIMHurtingCacai	14.8%	#1	#3	
63	Banta ni Loretta	April 15, 2016	#WIMBantaNiLoretta	14.7%	#1	#2	
64	Olivia in Danger	April 18, 2016	#WIMOliviaInDanger	16.4%	#1	#2	
65	Chimerism ni Olivia	April 19, 2016	#WIMChimerismNiOlivia	15.3%	#1	#2	
66	Cacai's B-day	April 20, 2016	#WIMCacaisBday	16.1%	#1	#3	
67	Sakripisyo ni Cacai	April 21, 2016	#WIMSakripisyoNiCacai	15.7%	#1	#3	
68	Rebelasyon ni Loretta	April 22, 2016	#WIMRebelasyonNiLoretta	17.0%	#1	#2	
69	Attempt kay Cacai	April 25, 2016	#WIMAttemptKayCacai	16.9%	#1	#2	
70	Cacai Escapes	April 26, 2016	#WIMCacaiEscapes	15.6%	#1	#2	
71	Matinding Rebelasyon	April 27, 2016	#WIMMatindingRebelasyon	17.8%	#1	#2	
72	Magkadugo	April 28, 2016	#WIMMagkadugo	16.1%	#1	#2	
73	Positive	April 29, 2016	#WIMPositive	16.9%	#1	#2	

=== May 2016 ===
Episode		Original air date	Social Media Hashtag	AGB Nielsen Mega Manila Households in Television Homes			Ref.
Episode		Original air date	Social Media Hashtag	Rating	Timeslot Rank	Afternoon Rank	Ref.
74	Lihim ni Audrey	May 2, 2016	#WIMLihimNiAudrey	16.9%	#1	#2	
75	Sino si Carlos?	May 3, 2016	#WIMSinoSiCarlos	16.3%	#1	#2	
76	Blackmail ni Carlos	May 4, 2016	#WIMBlackmailNiCarlos	16.4%	#1	#2	
77	Carina Visits Loretta	May 5, 2016	#WIMCarinaVisitsLoretta	16.1%	#1	#3	
78	Sumbat ni Tristan	May 6, 2016	#WIMSumbatNiTristan	16.2%	#1	#2	
79	Ang Ebidensiya	May 9, 2016	#WishIMay	13.6%	#1	#4	
80	Pagtakas ni Lorretta	May 10, 2016	#WishIMay	15.6%	#1	#2	
81	Katapusan ni Lorretta	May 11, 2016	#WIMKatapusanNiLoretta	16.7%	#1	#2	
82	Higanti ni Lorretta	May 12, 2016	#WIMHigantiNiLoretta	15.7%	#1	#2	
83	Paghihiganti	May 13, 2016	#WIMPaghihiganti	15.5%	#1	#2	
84	Pagmamakaawa ni Tristan	May 16, 2016	#WIMPagmamakaawaNiTristan	14.4%	#1	#3	
85	Katotohanan	May 17, 2016	#WIMKatotohanan	15.3%	#1	#2	
86	Tunay na Pagkatao	May 18, 2016	#WishIMay	15.3%	#1	#4	
87	Olivia and Cacai in Danger	May 19, 2016	#WIMOliviaCacaiInDanger	16.9%	#1	#2	
88	Finale	May 20, 2016	#WishIMayFinale	18.4%	#1	#1	
