= Mga Batang Riles =

2025 Philippine television drama series

- Title card
- Also known as: The Railway Kids
- Genre: Action drama
- Created by: Jake Somera
- Based on: Jesus dela Cruz at ang mga Batang Riles (1992)
- Written by: Glaiza Ramirez; Jake Somera; Reggie Amigo; Loi Argel Nova; Meryl Margaux Bunyi
- Directed by: Richard Ibasco Arellano; Laurice Guillen
- Creative director: Aloy Adlawan
- Starring: Miguel Tanfelix; Kokoy de Santos; Bruce Roeland; Raheel Bhyria; Antonio Vinzon
- Theme music composer: Rina Mercado
- Opening theme: "Batang Riles" by Zephanie and Hero
- Composer: Marvin Chua
- Country of origin: Philippines
- Original language: Tagalog
- No. of episodes: 117

Production
- Executive producer: Erwin Manzano Hilado
- Cinematography: Erwin Cruz
- Editors: Virgilio Custodio; Benedict Lavastida; Vincent Valenzuela
- Camera setup: Multiple-camera setup
- Running time: 23–38 minutes
- Production company: GMA Entertainment Group

Original release
- Network: GMA Network
- Release: January 6 – June 20, 2025

Mga Batang Riles (transl. railway kids / international title: The Railway Kids) is a 2025 Philippine television drama action series broadcast by GMA Network. The series is based on the 1992 Philippine film, Jesus dela Cruz at ang mga Batang Riles. Directed by Richard Ibasco Arellano and Laurice Guillen, it stars Miguel Tanfelix, Kokoy de Santos, Bruce Roeland, Raheel Bhyria and Antonio Vinzon. It premiered on January 6, 2025 on the network's Prime line up. The series concluded on June 20, 2025, with a total of 117 episodes.

The series is streaming online on YouTube.

== Premise ==
A group of young men gets wrongfully accused of a crime, sending them to a juvenile center. As they seek to clean their names for a crime they didn't commit, the group should protect themselves to find the real perpetrator.

== Cast and characters ==
Cast

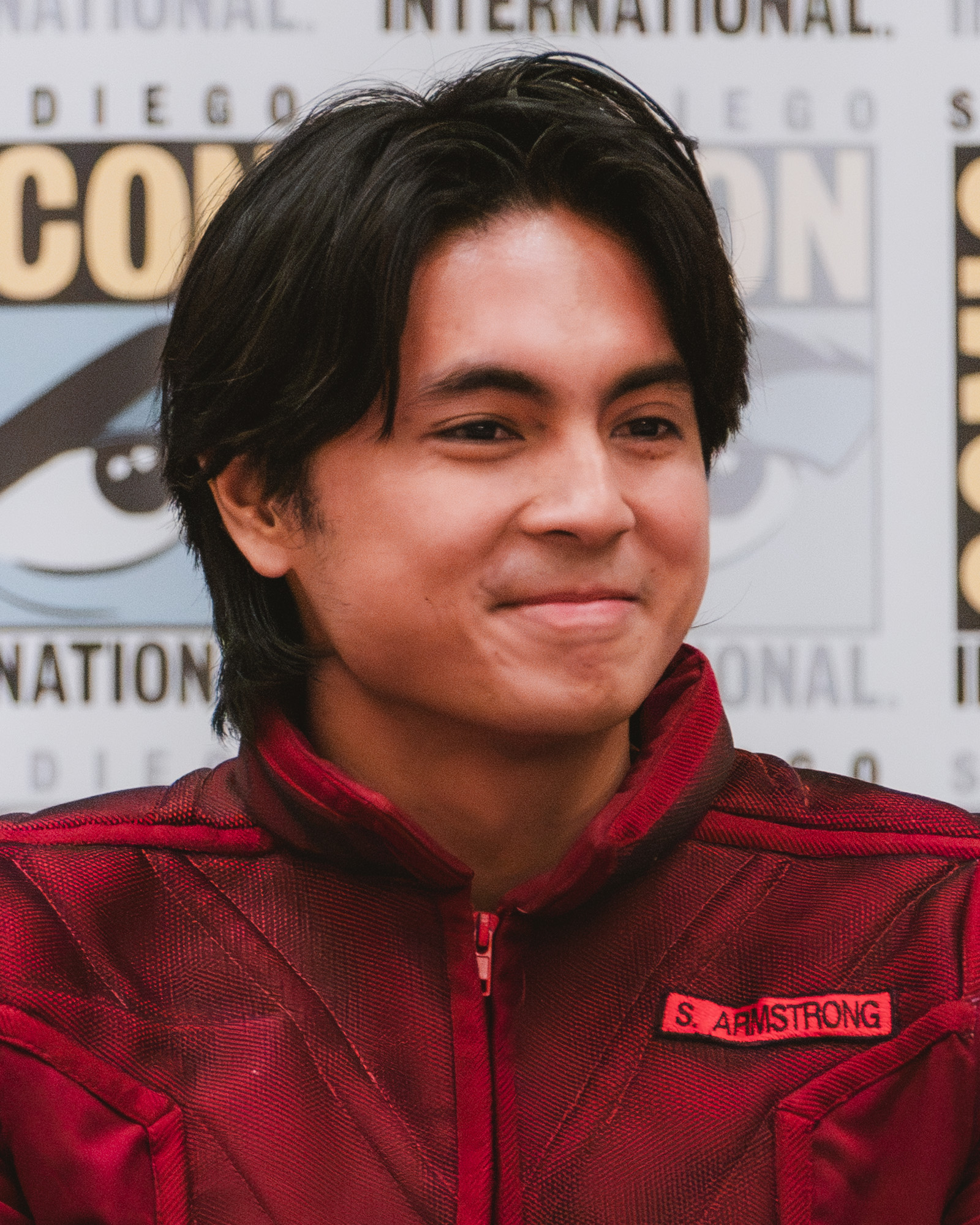
Miguel Tanfelix

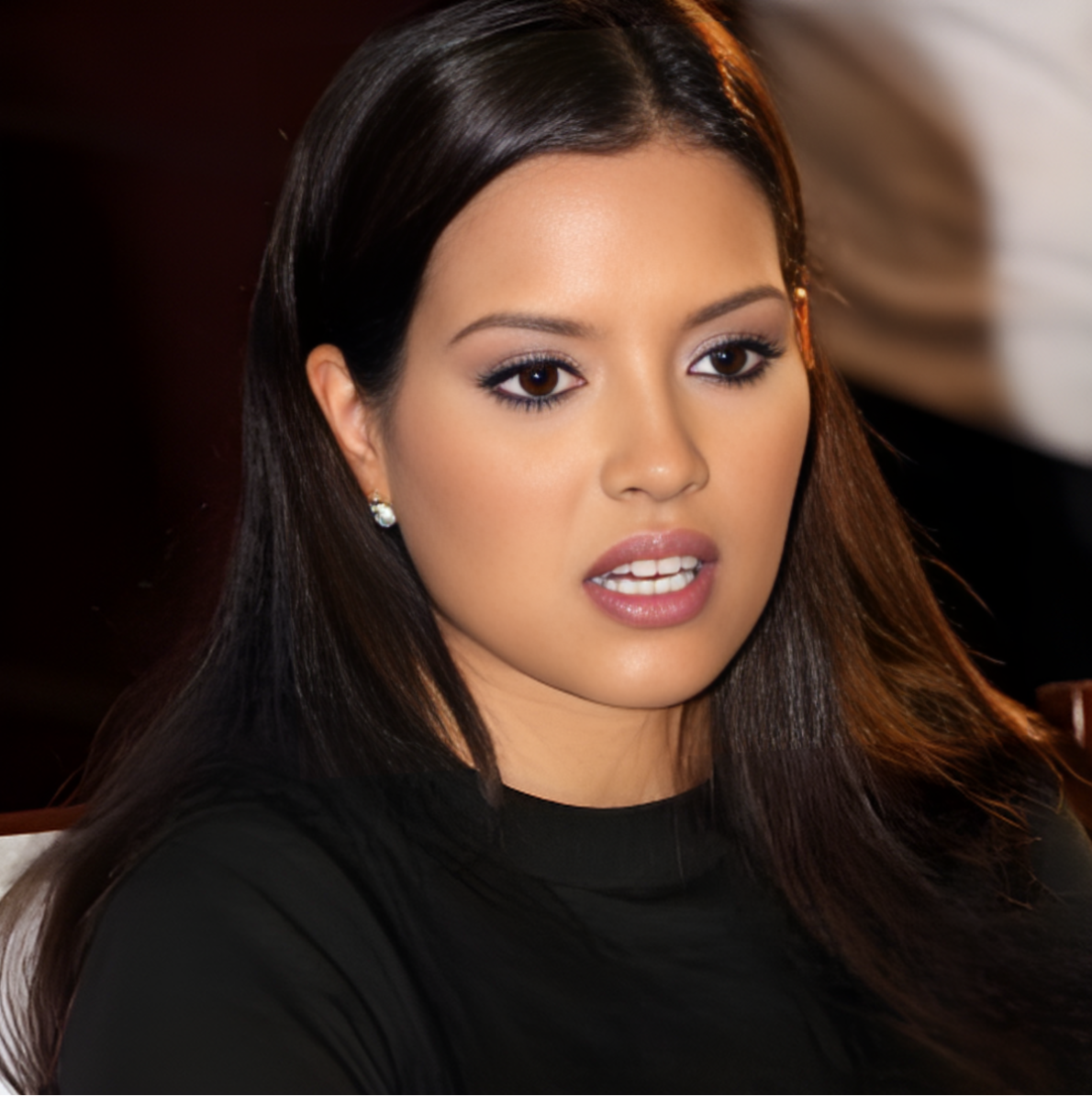
Desiree del Valle

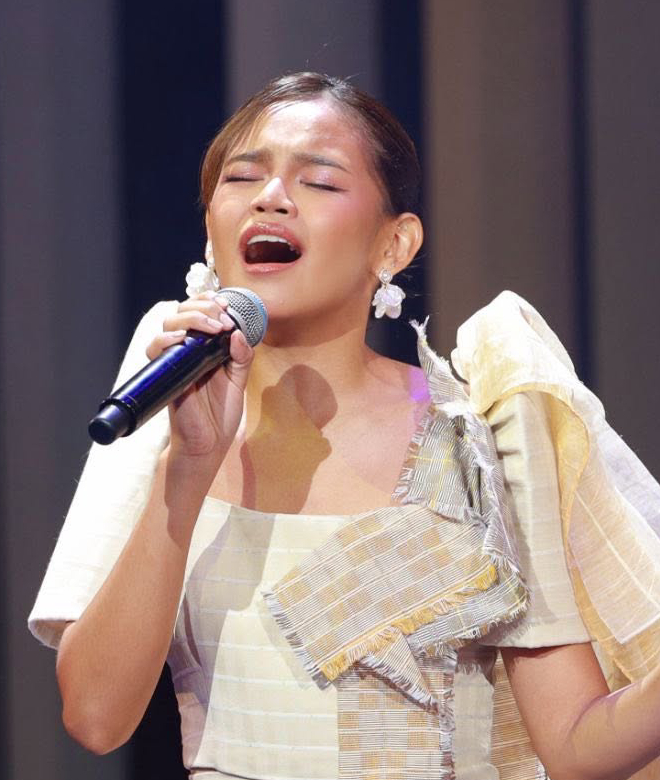
Zephanie

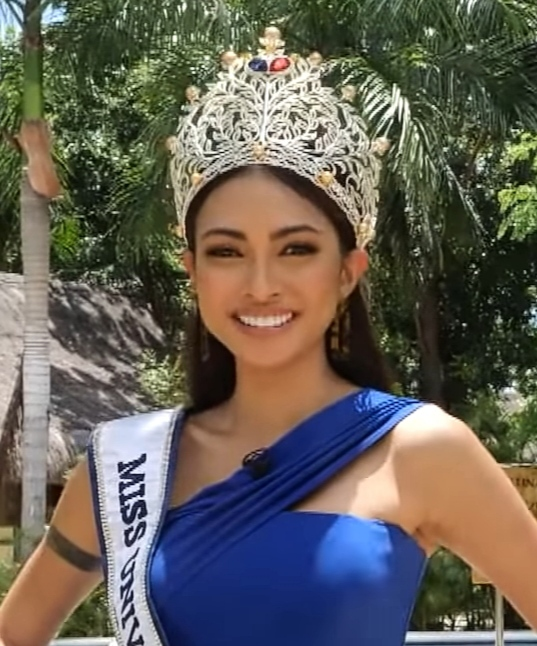
Beatrice Gomez

Lead cast

- Miguel Tanfelix as Kidlat Asuncion
- Kokoy de Santos as Christian "Kulot" Canlas
- Bruce Roeland as Matos Victor
- Raheel Bhyria as Sig Borja
- Antonio Vinzon as Dagul "Dags" Moreno

Supporting cast

- Ronnie Ricketts as Bayani Salvacion
- Diana Zubiri as Mariana "Maying" Asuncion
- Roderick Paulate as Pol Alhambra
- Jay Manalo as Rendon Victor
- Desiree del Valle as Scarlett Riego-Victor
- Eva Darren as Ima Hana Salvacion
- Jeric Raval as Argus Tolentino
- Zephanie as Mutya Bitangcol
- Dave Bornea as Angelo "Ssob" Manalo
- Faye Lorenzo as Georgina
- Migs Villasis as Max
- Miggy Tolentino as Jasper
- Seb Pajarillo as Tata
- Krissha Viaje as Missy Cuevas
- Jomar Yee as Lala Alhambra
- Spencer Serafica as Lulu Alhambra
- Leandro Baldemor as Lando
- Lara Morena as Reina
- Ynes Veneracion as Dolor Moreno
- Jenine Desiderio as Joyce
- Ian Ignacio as Vergel
- Renzo Cruz as Mayor Bitoy Sicat
- Caitlyn Stave as Chelsea Sison
- Beatrice Gomez as Olga
- Paolo Contis as Jackson Romano
- Joem Bascon as Gerald "Dr. K" Kalinga
- Jeremiah Tiangco
- Kim de Leon as Toteng
- Prince Villanueva as Timothy Victor
- Jay Arcilla as Onyok
- Robb Guinto as Honey
- Alex Calleja
- Mariz Ricketts as Patricia Sicat
- Juharra Asayo as April Moreno

Recurring cast

- Chuckie Dreyfus as Ferdie Canlas
- Cris Villanueva as Carlos "Caloy" Asuncion
- Tina Paner as Lilian Canlas
- Bodjie Pascua as Apo Kano Salvacion
- Abed Green as Jules

Guest cast

- Ai-Ai delas Alas as yaya Elma
- Benhur Abalos as himself
- Grace Tanfelix as Mommy Grace
- Jo Berry as Lilet Matias
- Jillian Ward as Lady
- Christopher Diwata as Chakob

== Casting ==
During the series' story conference on July 18, 2024, Philippine actors Miguel Tanfelix, Kokoy de Santos, Raheel Bhyria, Bruce Roeland and Antonio Vinzon were announced to headline the series. Other cast members were also announced including Zephanie Dimaranan, Diana Zubiri, Jay Manalo, Eva Darren, Desiree del Valle and Ronnie Ricketts. The cast members underwent into an acting workshop, prior to the filming of the series. In April 2025, actress Jo Berry made a guest appearance in the series, reprising her role as Lilet Matias in the Philippine legal drama series Lilet Matias: Attorney-at-Law.

== Production ==
Principal photography concluded on June 18, 2025.

== Ratings ==
According to AGB Nielsen Philippines' Nationwide Urban Television Audience Measurement People in television homes, the pilot episode of Mga Batang Riles earned a 10.4% rating. The final episode scored an 8.6% rating.
